= General Handbook =

Book of instructions from The Church of Jesus Christ of Latter-day Saints

General Handbook: Serving in The Church of Jesus Christ of Latter-day Saints
- Original title: Instructions to Presidents of Stakes, Bishops of Wards and Stake Tithing Clerks (1889)
- Language: English
- Publisher: The Church of Jesus Christ of Latter-day Saints
- Publication date: 2020
- Publication place: United States

The General Handbook: Serving in The Church of Jesus Christ of Latter-day Saints is an online book of instructions and policies for leaders and members of the Church of Jesus Christ of Latter-day Saints (LDS Church). The contents are prepared by the church's First Presidency and Quorum of the Twelve Apostles. Along with the church's standard works (i.e., its scriptural canon), the General Handbook stands as the preeminent policy and practice guide for the leaders of the LDS Church.

== Purpose ==
In general, the General Handbook contains institutional church policies, as opposed to church doctrine. However, brief statements of doctrine are commonly presented at the start of sections in the handbook to provide the doctrinal context in which the policies are being set and implemented. In that way, the General Handbook unifies the church's scripture and creeds with its ecclesiology and polity.

The General Handbook acts as a "standard reference point" for bishops and other leaders to make decisions. The leaders are encouraged to follow the handbook "with the guidance of the Holy Ghost" and with "sensitivity to individual circumstances."

== Contents and distribution ==
The topics in the General Handbook include guidelines involving general, area, and regional administration; duties of the stake president; duties of the bishop; temples and marriage; missionary service; administering church welfare; church membership councils and name removal; interviews and counseling; physical facilities; creating, changing, and naming new units; military relations; Church Educational System; Perpetual Education Fund; records and reports; finances; stake patriarch; ordinance and blessing policies; general church policies on administrative, medical and health, and moral issues. It also contains information primarily relevant to the functions of the leaders of the church's priesthood quorums and auxiliary organizations. In this area, the topics include guidelines involving families and the church in God's plan, priesthood principles, leadership in the church, the ward council, the work of salvation in the ward and stake, welfare principles and leadership, Melchizedek priesthood, Aaronic priesthood, Relief Society, Young Women, Primary, Sunday School, activities, music, stake organization, single members, uniformity and adaptation, meetings in the church, callings in the church, and priesthood ordinances and blessings.

Beginning in 2020, the handbook became available on the church website and other digital resources. This handbook superseded previous revisions, namely Handbook 1 (for stake presidents and bishops) and Handbook 2 (for all leaders), combining all information into a single digital publication. The material is primarily intended for church leaders.

=== Unauthorized distribution ===
Prior to 2020, portions of the Handbook were not publicly available. In the past, unauthorized copies of the restricted handbook have been made available on the Internet.

After the 1998 version of the Church Handbook was published, Jerald and Sandra Tanner's Utah Lighthouse Ministry published portions on the Internet without the church's permission or the book's copyright notice. The text was also disseminated to other websites to which the ULM's website linked. In a 1999 lawsuit Intellectual Reserve v. Utah Lighthouse Ministry, a United States district court issued an injunction prohibiting the further duplication of the contents of the handbook and ordered ULM to remove the offending material from its website.

In May 2008, the LDS Church notified the Wikimedia Foundation that it believed the copyright to the Handbook of Instructions had been violated by a link posted in Wikinews. The link directed readers to the text of the handbook on the WikiLeaks website, unaffiliated with the Wikimedia Foundation. Shortly after the complaint was made, Wikinews removed the link to the text from the article.

In 2010, the church placed part of the handbook on its official website, which was seen as "part of a recent trend in the church to become more transparent." In 2020, the entirety of the General Handbook was placed online.

== Media discussion ==
Although the General Handbook covers a wide variety of topics related to church organization and policy, media attention has focused largely on the church's policies on social issues that are outlined in the Handbook. As summarized by the Salt Lake Tribune, the Handbook states that the LDS Church

opposes gambling (including government-run lotteries), guns in churches, euthanasia, Satan worship and hypnotism for entertainment. It "strongly discourages" surrogate motherhood, sperm donation, surgical sterilizations (including vasectomies) and artificial insemination — when "using semen from anyone but the husband." But [the church] supports organ donation, paying income taxes, members running for political office and autopsies."

Regarding birth control, the Tribune comments:

The handbook says it is a "privilege" for Mormon couples to nurture and rear children, but the decision of how many to have is "extremely intimate and private and should be left between the couple and the Lord." Moreover, church members "should not judge one another in this matter." The book also says sexual relations in marriage "are divinely approved not only for the purpose of procreation, but also as a way of expressing love and strengthening emotional and spiritual bonds between husband and wife."

The Tribune has also noted that the LDS Church discourages the use of in vitro fertilization using semen and ova from people outside the couple and that the LDS Church has no official stance on drinking Coca-Cola.

The Tribune quoted one member of the church as applauding the public availability of the Handbook, as it will allow the members of the church to become more familiar with the church's stance on certain social issues:

"I've known church members who were shocked that the handbook strongly discourages vasectomies. They had no idea that there was any policy concerning it.... If there are such policies, I think it is wise that everyone — not just those with leadership callings — knows about them."

Some members have complained that the General Handbook does not always explain the doctrinal justification for the church's stance on certain social issues, such as that related to artificial insemination of single women in the church. The General Handbook states that artificial insemination of single women in the church "is not approved" and that "single sisters who deliberately refuse to follow the counsel of church leaders in this matter are subject to church discipline" but it does not explain why similar treatment would not be meted out to single women in the church who adopt children.

== History ==
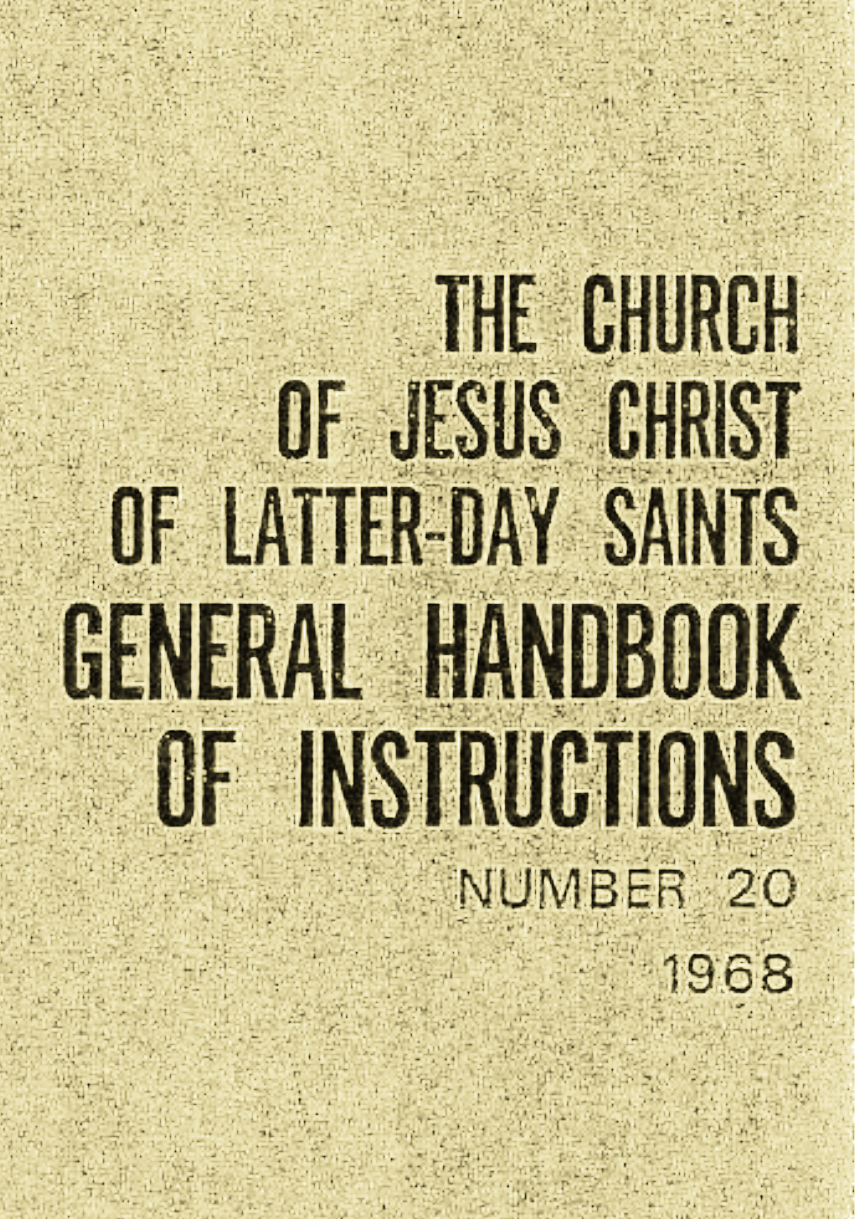
1968 Leader Handbook

The document that is identified as the first Church Handbook of Instructions was published in 1899 as a small, 14-page booklet. It primarily contained instructions on how to manage in-kind payments of tithing by church members. The handbook was revised every year until 1910 and approximately every five years thereafter. The book has been variously called the Annual Instructions, the Circular of Instructions, the Handbook of Instructions, the General Handbook of Instructions, the Church Handbook of Instructions, and finally the Handbook.

In 1998, the book was split into two volumes for the first time and was renamed the Church Handbook of Instructions. A new edition was published and released to church leaders in November 2010, with the new names Handbook 1 and Handbook 2. One of the major changes between the 2006 and 2010 versions of the handbook is that the 2010 version "softened the language about gay Mormons" and eliminated statements "that same-sex relationships 'distort loving relationships' and that gays should repent of their 'homosexual thoughts or feelings.'" In 2020, the two-volume handbook was consolidated into a single volume and it was published online in its entirety for the first time. As compared to earlier editions, the 2020 General Handbook has a "softer tone on discipline, [an] emphasis on pastoral care, ... clarity on complex issues and [a] push for greater compassion toward same-sex and transgender members".

=== Chronology ===
The following chronological listing of the publication's history was taken from an article by Edward L. Kimball (until 24(A)), supplemented with a list of later editions:

No.	Year	Title	Pages	First Presidency
1	1899	Instructions to Presidents of Stakes, Bishops of Wards and Stake Tithing Clerks	14	Lorenzo Snow, George Q. Cannon, Joseph F. Smith
2	1900	Instructions to Presidents of Stakes, Bishops and Clerks	23	Lorenzo Snow, George Q. Cannon, Joseph F. Smith
3	1901	Instructions to Presidents of Stakes and Counselors, Bishops and Counselors and Stake Tithing Clerks	43	Joseph F. Smith, John R. Winder, Anthon H. Lund
4	1902	Annual Instructions, No. 4, to Presidents of Stakes and Counselors, Presidents of Missions, High Counselors, Bishops and Counselors and Stake Tithing Clerks in Zion	38	Joseph F. Smith, John R. Winder, Anthon H. Lund
5	1903	Annual Instructions, No. 5, to Presidents of Stakes and Counselors, High Counselors, Bishops and Counselors and Stake Tithing Clerks in Zion, 1903-1904	28	Joseph F. Smith, John R. Winder, Anthon H. Lund
6	1904	Annual Instructions, No. 6, to Presidents of Stakes and Counselors, High Counselors, Bishops and Counselors and Stake Tithing Clerks in Zion	32	Joseph F. Smith, John R. Winder, Anthon H. Lund
7	1905	Annual Instructions, No. 7, to Presidents of Stakes and Counselors, High Counselors, Bishops and Counselors and Stake Tithing Clerks in Zion	34	Joseph F. Smith, John R. Winder, Anthon H. Lund
8	1906	Annual Instructions, No. Eight, to Presidents of Stakes and Counselors, Bishops and Counselors, Stake Clerks and General Authorities in Zion	34	Joseph F. Smith, John R. Winder, Anthon H. Lund
9	1908	Annual Instructions, 1908, Circular No. 9, to Presidents of Stakes and Counselors, Presidents of Missions, Bishops and Counselors, Stake and Ward Clerks and General Authorities in Zion	34	Joseph F. Smith, John R. Winder, Anthon H. Lund
10	1909	Annual Instructions, 1909, Circular No. 10, to Presidents of Stakes and Counselors, Presidents of Missions, Bishops and Counselors, Mission and Ward Clerks and All Church Authorities in Zion	41	Joseph F. Smith, John R. Winder, Anthon H. Lund
11	1909	Annual Instructions, to Presidents of Stakes and Counselors, Presidents of Missions, Bishops and Counselors, Mission and Ward Clerks and All Church Authorities in Zion, Circular No. 11	36	Joseph F. Smith, John R. Winder, Charles W. Penrose
12	1913	Circular of Instructions, No. 12, to Presidents of Stakes and Counselors, Presidents of Missions, Bishops and Counselors, Stake, Mission, and Ward Clerks and All Church Authorities	52	Joseph F. Smith, John R. Winder, Charles W. Penrose
12	1921	Instructions to Bishops and Counselors, Stake and Ward Clerks, No. 13	63	Heber J. Grant, Anthon H. Lund, Charles W. Penrose
13	1923	Instructions to Bishops and Counselors, Stake and Ward Clerks, No. 13, 2d ed.	63	Heber J. Grant, Anthon H. Lund, Anthony W. Ivins
14	1928	Handbook of Instructions for Bishops and Counselors, Stake and Ward Clerks of the Church of Jesus Christ of Latter-day Saints, No. 14	86	Heber J. Grant, Anthony W. Ivins, Charles W. Nibley
15	1934	Handbook of Instructions for Stake Presidencies, Bishops and Counselors, Stake and Ward Clerks, Number 15	111	Heber J. Grant, Anthony W. Ivins, J. Reuben Clark
16	1940	Handbook of Instructions for Stake Presidents and Counselors, Bishops and Counselors, Stake and Ward Clerks and Other Church Officers	159	Heber J. Grant, J. Reuben Clark, David O. McKay
17	1944	Handbook of Instructions for Stake Presidents and Counselors, Bishops and Counselors, Stake and Ward Clerks and Other Church Officers	272	Heber J. Grant, J. Reuben Clark, David O. McKay
18	1960	Handbook of Instructions for Stake Presidents and Counselors, Bishops and Counselors, Stake and Ward Clerks and Other Church Officers		David O. McKay, J. Reuben Clark, Henry D. Moyle
19	1963	Handbook of Instructions for Stake Presidents and Counselors, Bishops and Counselors, Stake and Ward Clerks and Other Church Officers	146	David O. McKay, Henry D. Moyle, Hugh B. Brown
20	1968	The Church of Jesus Christ of Latter-day Saints, General Handbook of Instructions	125	David O. McKay, Hugh B. Brown, N. Eldon Tanner, Thorpe B. Isaacson, Joseph Fielding Smith
21	1976	General Handbook of Instructions	110	Spencer W. Kimball, N. Eldon Tanner, Marion G. Romney
21(A)	1976	General Handbook Supplement 1	8	Spencer W. Kimball, N. Eldon Tanner, Marion G. Romney
21(B)	1977	General Handbook Supplement 2	7	Spencer W. Kimball, N. Eldon Tanner, Marion G. Romney
21(C)	1978	General Handbook Supplement 3	183	Spencer W. Kimball, N. Eldon Tanner, Marion G. Romney
21(D)	1978	The Church Judicial System (replaced section 8 of General Handbook of Instructions)	11	Spencer W. Kimball, N. Eldon Tanner, Marion G. Romney
22	1983	General Handbook of Instructions	82	Spencer W. Kimball, Marion G. Romney, Gordon B. Hinckley
23	1985	General Handbook of Instructions	79	Ezra Taft Benson, Gordon B. Hinckley, Thomas S. Monson
24	1989	General Handbook of Instructions	79	Ezra Taft Benson, Gordon B. Hinckley, Thomas S. Monson
24(A)	1991	Supplement to the 1989 General Handbook of Instructions	10	Ezra Taft Benson, Gordon B. Hinckley, Thomas S. Monson
25(1)	1998	Church Handbook of Instructions, Book 1: Stake Presidencies and Bishoprics	161	Gordon B. Hinckley, Thomas S. Monson, James E. Faust
25(2)	1998	Church Handbook of Instructions, Book 2: Priesthood and Auxiliary Leaders	167	Gordon B. Hinckley, Thomas S. Monson, James E. Faust
25(2-A)	2006	Church Handbook of Instructions, Book 2: Priesthood and Auxiliary Leaders: Section 9: Temple and Family History Work	8	Gordon B. Hinckley, Thomas S. Monson, James E. Faust
26(1)	2006	Church Handbook of Instructions, Book 1: Stake Presidencies and Bishoprics	205	Gordon B. Hinckley, Thomas S. Monson, James E. Faust
27(1)	2010	Handbook 1: Stake Presidents and Bishops	186	Thomas S. Monson, Henry B. Eyring, Dieter F. Uchtdorf
27(2)	2010	Handbook 2: Administering the Church	217	Thomas S. Monson, Henry B. Eyring, Dieter F. Uchtdorf
28	2020	General Handbook: Serving in The Church of Jesus Christ of Latter-day Saints	435	Russell M. Nelson, Dallin H. Oaks, Henry B. Eyring
