= George F. Richards =

American religious leader and politician

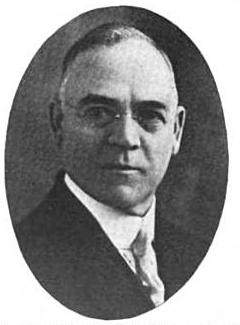

President of the Quorum of the Twelve Apostles
- May 21, 1945 – August 8, 1950
- Predecessor: George Albert Smith
- Successor: David O. McKay

Acting Presiding Patriarch
- October 8, 1937 – October 3, 1942
- Called by: Heber J. Grant
- End reason: Honorably released

Quorum of the Twelve Apostles
- April 9, 1906 – August 8, 1950
- Called by: Joseph F. Smith

LDS Church Apostle
- April 9, 1906 – August 8, 1950
- Called by: Joseph F. Smith
- Reason: Resignation of Matthias F. Cowley and John W. Taylor from the Quorum of the Twelve; death of Marriner W. Merrill
- Reorganization at end of term: Delbert L. Stapley ordained

Personal details
- Born: George Franklin Richards; February 23, 1861; Farmington, Utah Territory, United States
- Died: August 8, 1950 (aged 89); Salt Lake City, Utah
- Resting place: Salt Lake City Cemetery; 40°46′37.92″N 111°51′28.8″W
- Spouse(s): Alice A. Robinson
- Children: 15
- Parents: Franklin D. Richards; Nanny Longstroth

George Franklin Richards (February 23, 1861 – August 8, 1950) was a member of the Quorum of the Twelve Apostles of the Church of Jesus Christ of Latter-day Saints (LDS Church) from April 9, 1906, until his death. He also served as Acting Presiding Patriarch of the LDS Church from 1937 to 1942 and President of the Quorum of the Twelve from May 25, 1945, until his death.

== Family ==
Richards was born in Farmington, Utah Territory, the son of Franklin D. Richards and Nanny Longstroth. Richards' father was an apostle of the LDS Church and a member of the Quorum of the Twelve Apostles. Franklin D. Richards also served as President of the Quorum of the Twelve from 1898 to 1899.

After George Richards's death, one of his sons, LeGrand, became a member of the Quorum of the Twelve Apostles of the LDS Church, thus making the Richards family only the third Latter-day Saint family in history with three consecutive generations with members in the Quorum (the others being the succession of George A. Smith, John Henry Smith, and George Albert Smith and of Amasa M. Lyman, Francis M. Lyman, and Richard R. Lyman).

Alice Richards

Richards was baptized by Oliver L. Robinson, who would later become his father-in-law. In 1882, Richards married Alice A. Robinson. George and Alice had 15 children. One of the halls in Heritage Halls at Brigham Young University is named for Alice.

== Education ==
Richards received a degree in English from the University of Deseret, later the University of Utah. He also studied mathematics there.

== Employment and politics ==
Richards worked for the Utah Central Railway as a clerk from 1881 to 1882. From 1885 to 1888, Richards lived on a farm in Fielding, Box Elder County, Utah. In 1888, he moved to Tooele, Utah, where he served on the school board and on the irrigation board as well as directing the Tooele City Water Company. From 1888 until 1896 Richards was the manager of a ranch for his relative Abraham Doremus.

In 1896 Richards bought multiple tracks of land and begun a farm that grew wheat, lucern and also he raised cattle. Richards at the same time began to work as a lumber merchant, later also becoming a salesman of plows and other agricultural machinery. Initially in Tooele, Richards and his family lived and worked on the ranch of his uncle. In 1896, he bought his own house and farmland in Tooele. From 1899 to 1900, Richards served as a member of the Utah House of Representatives from Tooele County. He was a member of the Republic Party.

== LDS Church service ==
=== Early church callings ===
Richards was ordained an elder in the LDS Church at age fifteen. He received the endowment shortly after this. Among various early callings he held were those of home missionary (similar to what would later be called a stake missionary, and eventually a ward missionary) and president of the ward Young Men's Mutual Improvement Association (YMMIA). In 1890, Richards became second counselor in the presidency of the Tooele Utah Stake. He continued in this position until he was called as an apostle.

Richards in 1899

In 1893, Richards was ordained a patriarch by Francis M. Lyman. At age 32, Richards was one of the youngest men to have ever held this office in the church.

=== Calling as an apostle ===
In 1905, two members of the Quorum of the Twelve Apostles resigned after an argument over LDS Church doctrine and policy. John W. Taylor disagreed with the 1890 Manifesto forbidding plural marriage; Matthias F. Cowley felt that it should apply only to the territory of the United States. In February of the next year, apostle Marriner W. Merrill died; this left three vacancies in the Quorum.

On April 8, 1906, at the LDS Church's general conference, Richards was called to be an apostle by church president Joseph F. Smith. He was ordained and set apart the following day, ahead of Orson F. Whitney and David O. McKay.

=== Early assignments in the Twelve ===
Richards was appointed to the General Boards of the YMMIA and the Religion Classes shortly after his call to the Twelve. He also served as an advisor to the Primary General Board beginning in 1909, initially as one of the first two priesthood advisors to the board (along with Hyrum M. Smith).

During his early days in the Twelve, Richards went on several tours of missions in the United States as well as visiting many stake conferences.

=== Mission president ===
In 1916, Richards was made the president of the church's European Mission. In this position he was directly over missionary work in Great Britain as well as having a supervisory role over the mission presidents on the European continent. Among the mission presidents in mainland Europe was Richards's son LeGrand, who was president of the Netherlands Mission. George F. Richards, Jr. and his wife Edith accompanied George F. Richards while he served as mission president.

Richards succeeded Hyrum M. Smith as president of the European Mission.

=== Temple president ===
From 1921 to 1938, Richards was the president of the Salt Lake Temple. In this capacity, he assisted in the changing of the temple ordinances to conform with the church's "Good Neighbor" policy. During his time as temple president the modern methods and uses of the temple were largely instituted. Baptisms for health and ordinations of the sick were discontinued in the temple, and endowment sessions starting at night were begun.

=== Acting Presiding Patriarch ===
In 1937, Richards was asked by church president Heber J. Grant to assume the duties that would normally be carried out by the church's Presiding Patriarch. Richards accepted, and served in this capacity until 1942, when Grant called Joseph Fielding Smith to be the church's Presiding Patriarch. Richards was called, sustained, and set apart as the Acting Presiding Patriarch to the LDS Church because he was not a direct descendant of the first Latter Day Saint patriarch, Joseph Smith, Sr. During his tenure as Acting Presiding Patriarch, Richards remained a member of the Quorum of the Twelve Apostles and retained his seniority within that body.

=== President of the Twelve ===
With the death of LDS Church president Heber J. Grant, Richards became the second-most senior apostle in the church and thus the President of the Quorum of the Twelve on May 21, 1945, a position which he held until his death. He is the only person in the church's history to have been both the Presiding Patriarch and the President of the Quorum of the Twelve.

== Death ==
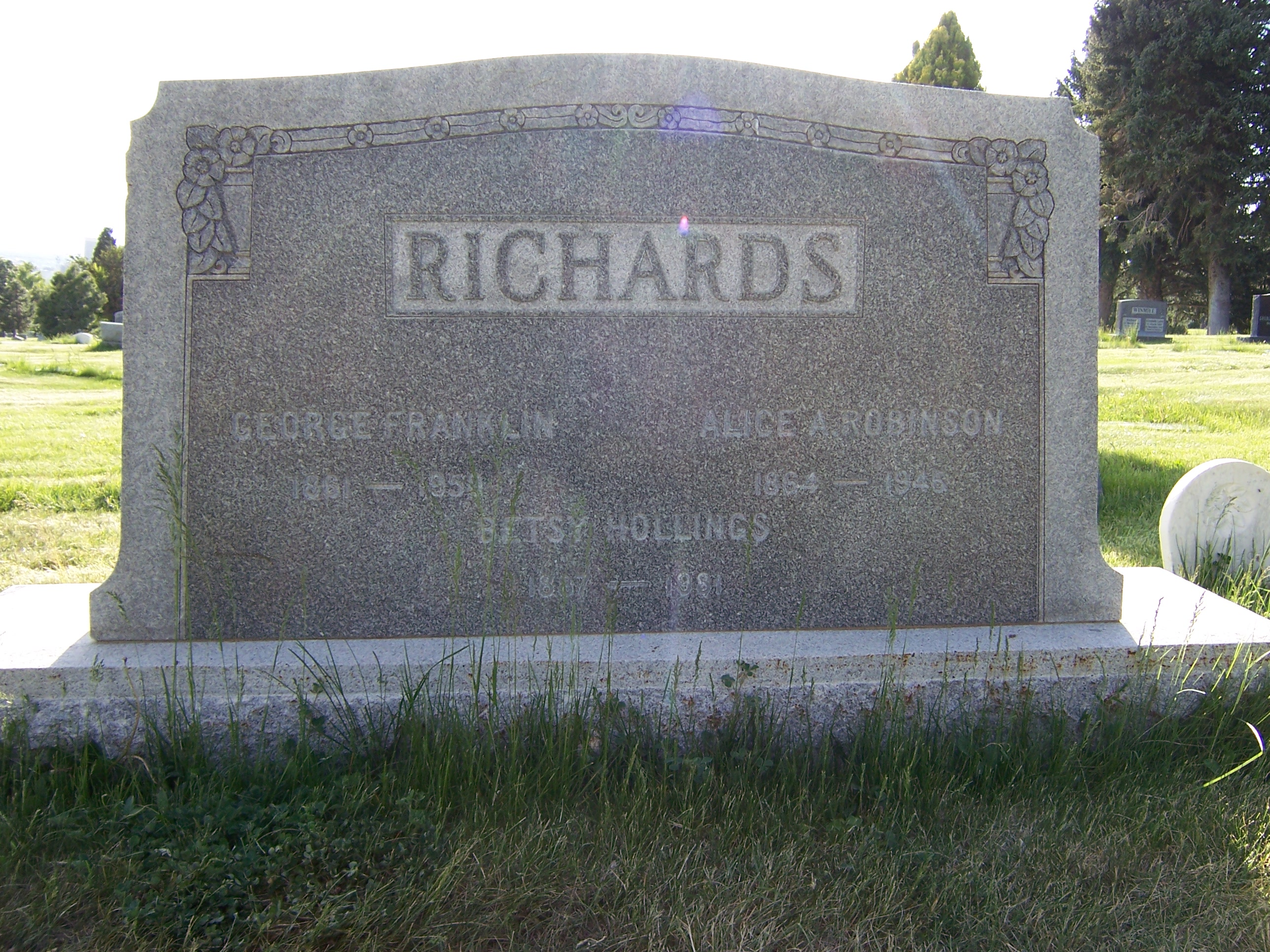
Grave marker of George F. Richards.

Richards died in Salt Lake City of coronary thrombosis. He was buried at Salt Lake City Cemetery. After Richards's death, Delbert L. Stapley was called in the October general conference of that year to fill the vacancy, and David O. McKay became President of the Quorum.

== See also ==
- Phrenology and the Latter Day Saint Movement

== Notes ==
The Church of Jesus Christ of Latter-day Saints titles
Preceded by George Albert Smith	President of the Quorum of the Twelve Apostles; May 21, 1945–August 8, 1950	Succeeded by David O. McKay
Preceded by Charles W. Penrose	Quorum of the Twelve Apostles; April 9, 1906–August 8, 1950	Succeeded by Orson F. Whitney
Preceded by Frank B. Woodbury as Acting Presiding Patriarch (de facto)	Acting Presiding Patriarch; October 8, 1937–October 3, 1942	Succeeded by Joseph Fielding Smith as Presiding Patriarch
