= Chronology of the First Presidency (LDS Church) =

What follows is a chronological table that sets out the changes in the composition of the First Presidency of the Church of Jesus Christ of Latter-day Saints (LDS Church) through time.

Date range	President of the Church (and Assistant Presidents)		First Counselor	Second Counselor	Other Counselors (3C = Third Counselor) C = Counselor AC = Assistant Counselor)		Change from previous organization
8 March 1832 – 3 December 1832	Joseph Smith	Joseph Smith Oliver Cowdery Hyrum Smith John C. Bennett	Jesse Gause	Sidney Rigdon		Oliver Cowdery Hyrum Smith Joseph Smith, Sr. John Smith Amasa Lyman	Initial organization of First Presidency
3 December 1832 – 18 March 1833	Joseph Smith	Joseph Smith Oliver Cowdery Hyrum Smith John C. Bennett		Sidney Rigdon		Oliver Cowdery Hyrum Smith Joseph Smith, Sr. John Smith Amasa Lyman	Jesse Gause excommunicated
18 March 1833 – 5 December 1834	Joseph Smith	Joseph Smith Oliver Cowdery Hyrum Smith John C. Bennett	Sidney Rigdon	Frederick G. Williams		Oliver Cowdery Hyrum Smith Joseph Smith, Sr. John Smith Amasa Lyman	Sidney Rigdon called as First Counselor; Frederick G. Williams called as Second Counselor
5 December 1834 – 3 September 1837	Joseph Smith (Oliver Cowdery)	Joseph Smith Oliver Cowdery Hyrum Smith John C. Bennett	Sidney Rigdon	Frederick G. Williams		Oliver Cowdery Hyrum Smith Joseph Smith, Sr. John Smith Amasa Lyman	Oliver Cowdery called as Assistant President of the Church
3 September 1837 – 7 November 1837	Joseph Smith (Oliver Cowdery)	Joseph Smith Oliver Cowdery Hyrum Smith John C. Bennett	Sidney Rigdon	Frederick G. Williams	Oliver Cowdery (AC); Hyrum Smith (AC); John Smith (AC); Joseph Smith, Sr. (AC)	Oliver Cowdery Hyrum Smith Joseph Smith, Sr. John Smith Amasa Lyman	Hyrum Smith, John Smith and Joseph Smith, Sr. called as Assistant Counselors; Oliver Cowdery also given the title of Assistant Counselor
7 November 1837 – 11 April 1838	Joseph Smith (Oliver Cowdery)	Joseph Smith Oliver Cowdery Hyrum Smith John C. Bennett	Sidney Rigdon	Hyrum Smith	Oliver Cowdery (AC); Joseph Smith, Sr. (AC); John Smith (AC)	Oliver Cowdery Hyrum Smith Joseph Smith, Sr. John Smith Amasa Lyman	Frederick G. Williams rejected as Second Counselor at church conference; Hyrum Smith called as Second Counselor
11 April 1838 – 14 September 1840	Joseph Smith	Joseph Smith Oliver Cowdery Hyrum Smith John C. Bennett	Sidney Rigdon	Hyrum Smith	Joseph Smith, Sr. (AC); John Smith (AC)	Oliver Cowdery Hyrum Smith Joseph Smith, Sr. John Smith Amasa Lyman	Oliver Cowdery excommunicated
14 September 1840 – 24 January 1841	Joseph Smith	Joseph Smith Oliver Cowdery Hyrum Smith John C. Bennett	Sidney Rigdon	Hyrum Smith	John Smith (AC)	Oliver Cowdery Hyrum Smith Joseph Smith, Sr. John Smith Amasa Lyman	Death of Joseph Smith, Sr.
24 January 1841 – 8 April 1841	Joseph Smith (Hyrum Smith)	Joseph Smith Oliver Cowdery Hyrum Smith John C. Bennett	Sidney Rigdon	William Law	John Smith (AC)	Oliver Cowdery Hyrum Smith Joseph Smith, Sr. John Smith Amasa Lyman	Hyrum Smith called as Assistant President of the Church; William Law replaces Hyrum Smith as Second Counselor
8 April 1841 – 25 May 1842	Joseph Smith (Hyrum Smith) (John C. Bennett)	Joseph Smith Oliver Cowdery Hyrum Smith John C. Bennett	Sidney Rigdon	William Law	John Smith (AC)	Oliver Cowdery Hyrum Smith Joseph Smith, Sr. John Smith Amasa Lyman	John C. Bennett called as Assistant President
25 May 1842 – 4 February 1843	Joseph Smith (Hyrum Smith)	Joseph Smith Oliver Cowdery Hyrum Smith John C. Bennett	Sidney Rigdon	William Law	John Smith (AC)	Oliver Cowdery Hyrum Smith Joseph Smith, Sr. John Smith Amasa Lyman	John C. Bennett disfellowshipped
4 February 1843 – 18 April 1844	Joseph Smith (Hyrum Smith)	Joseph Smith Oliver Cowdery Hyrum Smith John C. Bennett	Sidney Rigdon	William Law	John Smith (AC); Amasa Lyman (C)	Oliver Cowdery Hyrum Smith Joseph Smith, Sr. John Smith Amasa Lyman	Amasa Lyman called as Counselor
18 April 1844 – 27 June 1844	Joseph Smith (Hyrum Smith)	Joseph Smith Oliver Cowdery Hyrum Smith John C. Bennett	Sidney Rigdon		John Smith (AC); Amasa Lyman (C)	Oliver Cowdery Hyrum Smith Joseph Smith, Sr. John Smith Amasa Lyman	Apostasy of William Law
27 June 1844 – 27 December 1847	No organized First Presidency: Death of Joseph Smith and Hyrum Smith; dissolution of First Presidency						
27 December 1847 – 11 March 1854	Brigham Young		Heber C. Kimball	Willard Richards		Joseph F. Smith John Willard Young George Q. Cannon Brigham Young, Jr. Lorenzo Snow Albert Carrington	First Presidency reorganized after deaths of Joseph Smith and Hyrum Smith
11 March 1854 – 7 April 1854	Brigham Young		Heber C. Kimball			Joseph F. Smith John Willard Young George Q. Cannon Brigham Young, Jr. Lorenzo Snow Albert Carrington	Death of Willard Richards
7 April 1854 – 1 December 1856	Brigham Young		Heber C. Kimball	Jedediah M. Grant		Joseph F. Smith John Willard Young George Q. Cannon Brigham Young, Jr. Lorenzo Snow Albert Carrington	Jedediah M. Grant called as Second Counselor
1 December 1856 – 4 January 1857	Brigham Young		Heber C. Kimball			Joseph F. Smith John Willard Young George Q. Cannon Brigham Young, Jr. Lorenzo Snow Albert Carrington	Death of Jedediah M. Grant
4 January 1857 – 1 July 1866	Brigham Young		Heber C. Kimball	Daniel H. Wells		Joseph F. Smith John Willard Young George Q. Cannon Brigham Young, Jr. Lorenzo Snow Albert Carrington	Daniel H. Wells called as Second Counselor
1 July 1866 – 22 June 1868	Brigham Young		Heber C. Kimball	Daniel H. Wells	Joseph F. Smith (C)	Joseph F. Smith John Willard Young George Q. Cannon Brigham Young, Jr. Lorenzo Snow Albert Carrington	Joseph F. Smith called as Counselor
22 June 1868 – 7 October 1868	Brigham Young			Daniel H. Wells	Joseph F. Smith (C)	Joseph F. Smith John Willard Young George Q. Cannon Brigham Young, Jr. Lorenzo Snow Albert Carrington	Death of Heber C. Kimball
7 October 1868 – 8 April 1873	Brigham Young		George A. Smith	Daniel H. Wells	Joseph F. Smith (C)	Joseph F. Smith John Willard Young George Q. Cannon Brigham Young, Jr. Lorenzo Snow Albert Carrington	George A. Smith called as First Counselor
8 April 1873 – 9 May 1874	Brigham Young		George A. Smith	Daniel H. Wells	Joseph F. Smith (C); John Willard Young (C); George Q. Cannon (C); Brigham Young, Jr. (C); Lorenzo Snow (C); Albert Carrington (C)	Joseph F. Smith John Willard Young George Q. Cannon Brigham Young, Jr. Lorenzo Snow Albert Carrington	John Willard Young, George Q. Cannon, Brigham Young, Jr., Lorenzo Snow, and Albert Carrington called as Counselors
9 May 1874 – 1 September 1875	Brigham Young		George A. Smith	Daniel H. Wells	Joseph F. Smith (C); John Willard Young (AC); George Q. Cannon (AC); Brigham Young, Jr. (AC); Lorenzo Snow (AC); Albert Carrington (AC)	Joseph F. Smith John Willard Young George Q. Cannon Brigham Young, Jr. Lorenzo Snow Albert Carrington	Titles of all additional counselors (except Joseph F. Smith) changed from Counselor to Assistant Counselor
1 September 1875 – 8 October 1876	Brigham Young			Daniel H. Wells	Joseph F. Smith (C); John Willard Young (AC); George Q. Cannon (AC); Brigham Young, Jr. (AC); Lorenzo Snow (AC); Albert Carrington (AC)	Joseph F. Smith John Willard Young George Q. Cannon Brigham Young, Jr. Lorenzo Snow Albert Carrington	Death of George A. Smith
8 October 1876 – 29 August 1877	Brigham Young		John Willard Young	Daniel H. Wells	Joseph F. Smith (C); George Q. Cannon (AC); Brigham Young, Jr. (AC); Lorenzo Snow (AC); Albert Carrington (AC)	Joseph F. Smith John Willard Young George Q. Cannon Brigham Young, Jr. Lorenzo Snow Albert Carrington	John Willard Young called as First Counselor
29 August 1877 – 10 October 1880	No organized First Presidency; Death of Brigham Young; dissolution of First Presidency						
10 October 1880 – 25 July 1887	John Taylor		George Q. Cannon	Joseph F. Smith			First Presidency reorganized after death of Brigham Young
25 July 1887 – 7 April 1889	No organized First Presidency; Death of John Taylor; dissolution of First Presidency						
7 April 1889 – 2 September 1898	Wilford Woodruff		George Q. Cannon	Joseph F. Smith			First Presidency reorganized after death of John Taylor
2 September 1898 – 13 September 1898	No organized First Presidency; Death of Wilford Woodruff; dissolution of First Presidency						
13 September 1898 – 12 April 1901	Lorenzo Snow		George Q. Cannon	Joseph F. Smith			First Presidency reorganized after death of Wilford Woodruff
12 April 1901 – 6 October 1901	Lorenzo Snow			Joseph F. Smith			Death of George Q. Cannon
6 October 1901 – 10 October 1901	Lorenzo Snow		Joseph F. Smith	Rudger Clawson			Joseph F. Smith called as First Counselor; Rudger Clawson called as Second Counselor. NOTE: These counselors were sustained but not set apart due to the death of Snow 4 days later
10 October 1901 – 17 October 1901	No organized First Presidency; Death of Lorenzo Snow; dissolution of First Presidency						
17 October 1901 – 27 March 1910	Joseph F. Smith		John R. Winder	Anthon H. Lund			Reorganization of First Presidency after death of Lorenzo Snow
27 March 1910 – 7 April 1910	Joseph F. Smith			Anthon H. Lund			Death of John R. Winder
7 April 1910 – 13 October 1911	Joseph F. Smith		Anthon H. Lund	John Henry Smith			Anthon H. Lund called as First Counselor; John Henry Smith called as Second Counselor
13 October 1911 – 7 December 1911	Joseph F. Smith		Anthon H. Lund				Death of John Henry Smith
7 December 1911 – 19 November 1918	Joseph F. Smith		Anthon H. Lund	Charles W. Penrose			Charles W. Penrose called as Second Counselor
19 November 1918 – 23 November 1918	No organized First Presidency; Death of Joseph F. Smith; dissolution of First Presidency						
23 November 1918 – 2 March 1921	Heber J. Grant		Anthon H. Lund	Charles W. Penrose			Reorganization of First Presidency after death of Joseph F. Smith
2 March 1921 – 10 March 1921	Heber J. Grant			Charles W. Penrose			Death of Anthon H. Lund
10 March 1921 – 16 May 1925	Heber J. Grant		Charles W. Penrose	Anthony W. Ivins			Charles W. Penrose called as First Counselor; Anthony W. Ivins called as Second Counselor
16 May 1925 – 28 May 1925	Heber J. Grant			Anthony W. Ivins			Death of Charles W. Penrose
28 May 1925 – 11 December 1931	Heber J. Grant		Anthony W. Ivins	Charles W. Nibley			Anthony W. Ivins called as First Counselor; Charles W. Nibley called as Second Counselor
11 December 1931 – 6 April 1933	Heber J. Grant		Anthony W. Ivins				Death of Charles W. Nibley
6 April 1933 – 23 September 1934	Heber J. Grant		Anthony W. Ivins	J. Reuben Clark			J. Reuben Clark called as Second Counselor
23 September 1934 – 11 October 1934	Heber J. Grant			J. Reuben Clark			Death of Anthony W. Ivins
11 October 1934 – 14 May 1945	Heber J. Grant		J. Reuben Clark	David O. McKay			J. Reuben Clark called as First Counselor; David O. McKay called as Second Counselor
14 May 1945 – 21 May 1945	No organized First Presidency; Death of Heber J. Grant; dissolution of First Presidency						
21 May 1945 – 4 April 1951	George Albert Smith		J. Reuben Clark	David O. McKay			Reorganization of First Presidency after death of Heber J. Grant
4 April 1951 – 9 April 1951	No organized First Presidency; Death of George Albert Smith; dissolution of First Presidency						
9 April 1951 – 19 May 1959	David O. McKay		Stephen L Richards	J. Reuben Clark			Reorganization of First Presidency after death of George Albert Smith
19 May 1959 – 12 June 1959	David O. McKay			J. Reuben Clark			Death of Stephen L Richards
12 June 1959 – 22 June 1961	David O. McKay		J. Reuben Clark	Henry D. Moyle			J. Reuben Clark called as First Counselor; Henry D. Moyle called as Second Counselor
22 June 1961 – 6 October 1961	David O. McKay		J. Reuben Clark	Henry D. Moyle	Hugh B. Brown (3C)		Hugh B. Brown called as Third Counselor
6 October 1961 – 12 October 1961	David O. McKay			Henry D. Moyle	Hugh B. Brown (3C)		Death of J. Reuben Clark
12 October 1961 – 18 September 1963	David O. McKay		Henry D. Moyle	Hugh B. Brown			Henry D. Moyle called as First Counselor; Hugh B. Brown called as Second Counselor
18 September 1963 – 4 October 1963	David O. McKay			Hugh B. Brown			Death of Henry D. Moyle
4 October 1963 – 28 October 1965	David O. McKay		Hugh B. Brown	N. Eldon Tanner			Hugh B. Brown called as First Counselor; N. Eldon Tanner called as Second Counselor
28 October 1965 – 29 October 1965	David O. McKay		Hugh B. Brown	N. Eldon Tanner	Thorpe B. Isaacson (C)	Isaacson Smith Dyer	Thorpe B. Isaacson called as Counselor
29 October 1965 – 6 April 1968	David O. McKay		Hugh B. Brown	N. Eldon Tanner	Thorpe B. Isaacson (C); Joseph Fielding Smith (C)	Isaacson Smith Dyer	Joseph Fielding Smith called as Counselor
6 April 1968 – 18 January 1970	David O. McKay		Hugh B. Brown	N. Eldon Tanner	Thorpe B. Isaacson (C); Joseph Fielding Smith (C); Alvin R. Dyer (C)	Isaacson Smith Dyer	Alvin R. Dyer called as Counselor
18 January 1970 – 23 January 1970	No organized First Presidency; Death of David O. McKay; dissolution of First Presidency						
23 January 1970 – 2 July 1972	Joseph Fielding Smith		Harold B. Lee	N. Eldon Tanner			Reorganization of First Presidency after death of David O. McKay
2 July 1972 – 7 July 1972	No organized First Presidency; Death of Joseph Fielding Smith; dissolution of First Presidency						
7 July 1972 – 26 December 1973	Harold B. Lee		N. Eldon Tanner	Marion G. Romney			Reorganization of First Presidency after death of Joseph Fielding Smith
26 December 1973 – 30 December 1973	No organized First Presidency; Death of Harold B. Lee; dissolution of First Presidency						
30 December 1973 – 23 July 1981	Spencer W. Kimball		N. Eldon Tanner	Marion G. Romney			Reorganization of First Presidency after death of Harold B. Lee
23 July 1981 – 27 November 1982	Spencer W. Kimball		N. Eldon Tanner	Marion G. Romney	Gordon B. Hinckley (C)		Gordon B. Hinckley called as Counselor
27 November 1982 – 2 December 1982	Spencer W. Kimball			Marion G. Romney	Gordon B. Hinckley (C)		Death of N. Eldon Tanner
2 December 1982 – 5 November 1985	Spencer W. Kimball		Marion G. Romney	Gordon B. Hinckley			Marion G. Romney called as First Counselor; Gordon B. Hinckley called as Second Counselor
5 November 1985 – 10 November 1985	No organized First Presidency; Death of Spencer W. Kimball; dissolution of First Presidency						
10 November 1985 – 30 May 1994	Ezra Taft Benson		Gordon B. Hinckley	Thomas S. Monson			Reorganization of First Presidency after death of Spencer W. Kimball
30 May 1994 – 5 June 1994	No organized First Presidency; Death of Ezra Taft Benson; dissolution of First Presidency						
5 June 1994 – 3 March 1995	Howard W. Hunter		Gordon B. Hinckley	Thomas S. Monson			Reorganization of First Presidency after death of Ezra Taft Benson
3 March 1995 – 12 March 1995	No organized First Presidency; Death of Howard W. Hunter; dissolution of First Presidency						
12 March 1995 – 10 August 2007	Gordon B. Hinckley		Thomas S. Monson	James E. Faust			Reorganization of First Presidency after death of Howard W. Hunter
10 August 2007 – 6 October 2007	Gordon B. Hinckley		Thomas S. Monson				Death of James E. Faust
6 October 2007 – 27 January 2008	Gordon B. Hinckley		Thomas S. Monson	Henry B. Eyring			Henry B. Eyring called as Second Counselor
27 January 2008 – 3 February 2008	No organized First Presidency; Death of Gordon B. Hinckley; dissolution of First Presidency						
3 February 2008 – 2 January 2018	Thomas S. Monson		Henry B. Eyring	Dieter F. Uchtdorf			Reorganization of First Presidency after death of Gordon B. Hinckley
2 January 2018 – 14 January 2018	No organized First Presidency; Death of Thomas S. Monson; dissolution of First Presidency						
14 January 2018 – 27 September 2025	Russell M. Nelson		Dallin H. Oaks	Henry B. Eyring			Reorganization of First Presidency after death of Thomas S. Monson
27 September 2025 – 14 October 2025	No organized First Presidency; Death of Russell M. Nelson; dissolution of First Presidency						
14 October 2025 –	Dallin H. Oaks		Henry B. Eyring	D. Todd Christofferson			Reorganization of First Presidency after death of Russell M. Nelson

== See also ==
- Chronology of the Quorum of the Twelve Apostles (LDS Church)
- List of members of the Quorum of the Twelve Apostles (LDS Church)
- List of presidents of the Church of Jesus Christ of Latter-day Saints
- President of the Church (LDS Church)
