= Marion G. Romney =

American LDS Church leader (1897–1988)

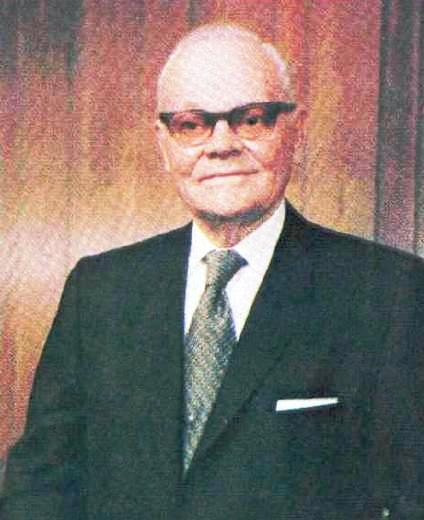

President of the Quorum of the Twelve Apostles (with Howard W. Hunter as Acting President)
- November 10, 1985 – May 20, 1988
- Predecessor: Ezra Taft Benson
- Successor: Howard W. Hunter

Quorum of the Twelve Apostles
- November 5, 1985 – May 20, 1988

First Counselor in the First Presidency
- December 2, 1982 – November 5, 1985
- Called by: Spencer W. Kimball
- End reason: Dissolution of First Presidency upon death of Spencer W. Kimball

Second Counselor in the First Presidency
- July 7, 1972 – December 2, 1982
- Called by: Harold B. Lee
- End reason: Called as First Counselor in the First Presidency

Quorum of the Twelve Apostles
- October 4, 1951 – July 7, 1972
- Called by: David O. McKay
- End reason: Called as Second Counselor in the First Presidency

LDS Church Apostle
- October 11, 1951 – May 20, 1988
- Called by: David O. McKay
- Reason: Death of George Albert Smith and reorganization of First Presidency
- Reorganization at end of term: Richard G. Scott ordained

Assistant to the Quorum of the Twelve Apostles
- April 6, 1941 – October 4, 1951
- Called by: Heber J. Grant
- End reason: Called to the Quorum of the Twelve Apostles

Personal details
- Born: Marion George Romney; September 19, 1897; Colonia Juárez, Chihuahua, Mexico
- Died: May 20, 1988 (aged 90); Salt Lake City, Utah, U.S.
- Resting place: Wasatch Lawn Memorial Park; 40°41′52.08″N 111°50′30.12″W
- Spouse(s): Ida Romney
- Children: 4
- Parents: George S. Romney (father)

Marion George Romney (September 19, 1897 – May 20, 1988) was an apostle and a member of the First Presidency of the Church of Jesus Christ of Latter-day Saints (LDS Church).

== Early life ==
Romney was born in Colonia Juárez, Chihuahua, Mexico, to expatriated parents, George S. Romney and Terressa Artemesia Romney (née Redd).

His cousin was Michigan governor George W. Romney, who was born in nearby Colonia Dublan. As such, he was the first cousin, once removed of Utah Senator and former presidential candidate Mitt Romney.

Romney was the second of ten children. His younger sister, Lurlene Romney Cheney, later converted to Catholicism and entered a religious order as Sister Mary Catherine, a Carmelite nun at the Carmel of the Immaculate Heart of Mary in Holladay, Utah.

Romney studied at Academia Juárez until his family left Mexico in 1912, when violence from the ongoing Mexican revolution spread to their region. He lived with them for the remainder of his youth in California and Idaho. In 1917, the Romneys moved to Rexburg, Idaho, where his father became principal of Ricks Academy. Romney graduated valedictorian of Ricks high school in 1918.

From 1920 to 1923, Romney served as an LDS Church missionary in Australia. After returning, he worked in construction in Salt Lake City for his uncle, Gaskell Romney (father of George W. Romney).

== Higher education and family ==
Romney studied at Brigham Young University (BYU) for a year. While there, he renewed his acquaintance with Ida Jensen, a former teacher at Ricks and then a post-graduate candidate at BYU. Romney and Jensen married September 12, 1924, in the Salt Lake Temple, officiated by Joseph Fielding Smith.

Romney next studied at the University of Utah, receiving a bachelor's degree in political science and history in 1926. Romney studied law at the University of Utah, but did not complete course work there. He passed the Utah bar exam in 1929.

Romney and his wife had three children together; two died in infancy. Their son, George Jensen Romney, survived to adulthood. They also adopted a child, Richard Jensen Romney. George served an LDS Church mission. In April 1983, he delivered a General Conference sermon written by his father. Ida Romney died in 1979 at age 88.

== Church service and politics ==
Romney first worked for the post office, and later became an assistant prosecuting attorney in Salt Lake City. In 1934, he successfully campaigned for the Utah House of Representatives as a Democrat. While campaigning, he was called as an LDS Church bishop by stake president Bryant S. Hinckley. After his election, his bishop ordination was delayed until after the legislature's term in April 1935, with him seeking and serving only one term. While in the legislature, Romney helped author Utah's liquor control law.

=== General authority ===
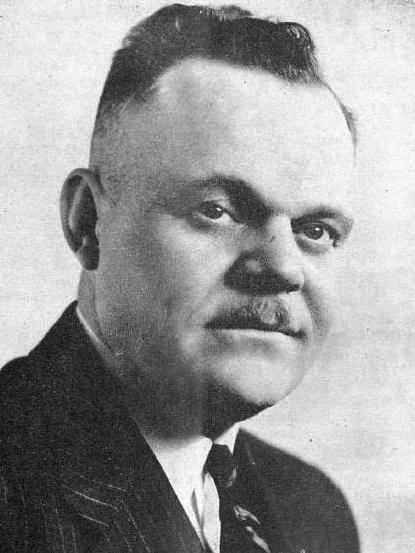
Romney while an Assistant to the Quorum of the Twelve Apostles

Romney's 47 years as a general authority of the LDS Church began as one of the first five Assistants to the Quorum of the Twelve Apostles called to the new position in 1941. In 1951, he was called to the Quorum of the Twelve. In 1960, Romney helped develop the home teaching program of the LDS Church.

In 1961, Romney was appointed area supervisor for the LDS Church in Mexico. Although he had lived his first fifteen years in Mexico, it was in the mainly American Mormon colonies, and he knew very little Spanish. Assisted by Eduardo Balderas in learning Spanish, Romney supervised the church's growth in Mexico for the next eleven years. He oversaw construction of many meetinghouses in Mexico, along with organization of the first Spanish-language stakes in Mexico.

Romney became Second Counselor to church president Harold B. Lee in 1972.

Following Lee's death the following year, Spencer W. Kimball became the church president and he retained Romney as the Second Counselor. As the First Presidency, Kimball, Tanner, and Romney announced the 1978 Revelation on Priesthood, canonized as "Official Declaration 2" in the Doctrine and Covenants.

When Kimball, Tanner, and Romney all aged and developed health problems at similar rates, Gordon B. Hinckley was added as an additional counselor in 1981. Upon Tanner's death in 1982, Romney became First Counselor and Hinckley the Second Counselor, though Romney was relatively inactive in his position due to poor health. When Kimball died in 1985, press reports indicated that Romney had not been seen in public for many months.

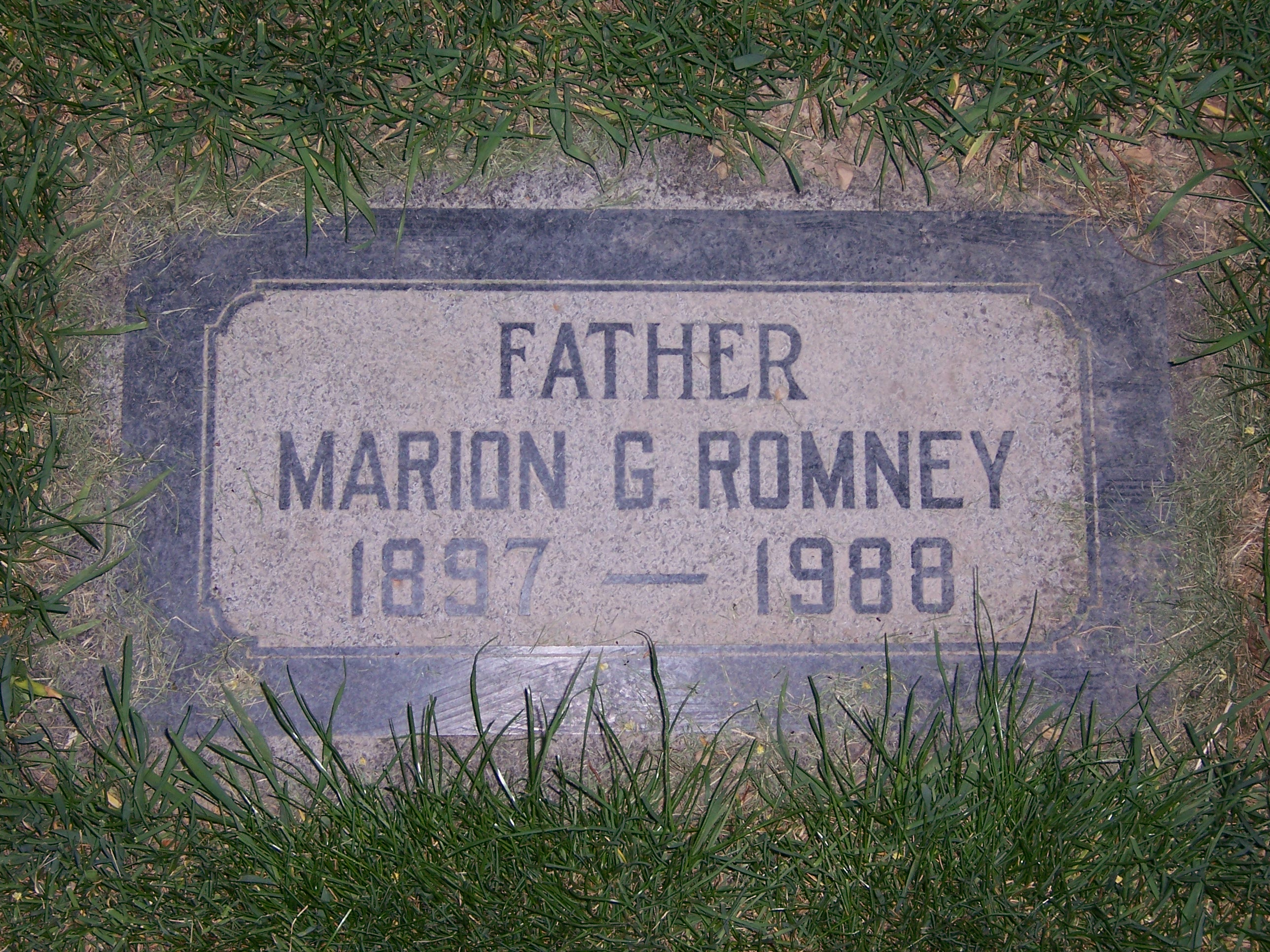
Marion G. Romney's grave marker

Ezra Taft Benson, who had been President of the Quorum of the Twelve Apostles, then became the church president and named Hinckley as First Counselor, with Thomas S. Monson as Second Counselor. Romney, as the apostle with the second-longest seniority in the church, became the quorum president. However, "because President Romney’s health [kept] him from taking an active part in Church administration," Howard W. Hunter, the next in seniority, served as acting president.

Romney died from natural causes at his home in Salt Lake City at age 90. He served 47 years as a church general authority. Funeral services were held in the Salt Lake Tabernacle on May 23, 1988, presided over by Benson. Romney was buried at Wasatch Lawn Memorial Park in Salt Lake City, beside his wife, approximately 10 years after her death. The Deseret News Church Almanac remembered him as a "renowned Church Welfare pioneer and Book of Mormon scholar".

== See also ==
- Thomas E. McKay
- Nicholas G. Smith

The Church of Jesus Christ of Latter-day Saints titles
Preceded by Ezra Taft Benson	President of the Quorum of the Twelve Apostles; November 10, 1985 – May 20, 1988	Succeeded by Howard W. Hunter
Preceded by N. Eldon Tanner	First Counselor in the First Presidency; December 2, 1982 – November 5, 1985	Succeeded by Gordon B. Hinckley
Preceded by N. Eldon Tanner	Second Counselor in the First Presidency; July 7, 1972 – December 2, 1982	Succeeded by Gordon B. Hinckley
Preceded by Delbert L. Stapley	Quorum of the Twelve Apostles; October 11, 1951 – July 7, 1972; November 5, 1985 – May 20, 1988	Succeeded by LeGrand Richards
