= Richard R. Lyman =

American religious leader (1870-1963)

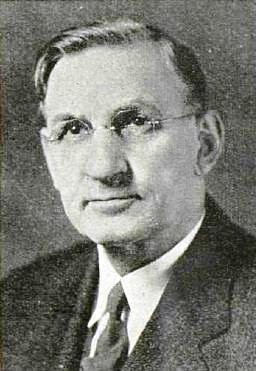

Quorum of the Twelve Apostles
- April 7, 1918 – November 12, 1943
- End reason: Excommunicated for violating law of chastity

LDS Church Apostle
- April 7, 1918 – November 12, 1943
- Reason: Death of Hyrum M. Smith
- End reason: Excommunicated for violating law of chastity
- Reorganization at end of term: Mark E. Petersen ordained

Personal details
- Born: Richard Roswell Lyman; November 23, 1870; Fillmore, Utah Territory, U.S.
- Died: December 31, 1963 (aged 93); Salt Lake City, Utah, U.S.
- Alma mater: University of Michigan
- Spouse(s): Amy Brown Lyman

Richard Roswell Lyman (November 23, 1870 – December 31, 1963) was an American engineer and religious leader who was an apostle in the Church of Jesus Christ of Latter-day Saints (LDS Church) from 1918 to 1943.

Lyman is often noted as the most recent LDS Church apostle to have been excommunicated. In 1943, the church's First Presidency became aware that Lyman had for a number of years been in an intimate relationship with a woman other than his legal wife. The Quorum of the Twelve Apostles convened a disciplinary council and Lyman was immediately excommunicated. Lyman was rebaptized in 1954 at age 83, nine years prior to his death.

Lyman was the husband of Amy B. Lyman, the church's Relief Society general president during the period of his excommunication.

== Early life and family ==
Lyman was born in Fillmore, Utah Territory, and was closely related to many early leaders of the LDS Church. His father, Francis M. Lyman, was the son of Amasa M. Lyman, both of whom were LDS Church apostles. His mother was Clara Caroline Callister, whose grandfather was John Smith, an uncle of church founder Joseph Smith and a church Presiding Patriarch. Clara's mother was Caroline Smith Callister, the only sister of apostle George A. Smith, who served with Brigham Young as a counselor in the First Presidency. Lyman was ordained an elder in the LDS Church on August 29, 1891, by Joseph F. Smith.

== Education and marriage ==
Lyman completed a Normal Certificate (1891) at Brigham Young Academy (BYA) in Provo, Utah, taught at Brigham Young College in Logan, Utah, and completed a BS (1895) at the University of Michigan, an MA (civil engineering, 1903) at the University of Chicago in 1903 and a PhD (1905) at Cornell University.

In 1888 Lyman began courting Amy Brown; they married on September 9, 1896. The marriage ceremony was performed by Joseph F. Smith in the Salt Lake Temple.. Lyman taught at BYA (1895-1896).

Richard and Amy Brown Lyman in 1924, returning from a trip to Hawaii where they participated in the dedication of a chapel in Honolulu

Amy Brown Lyman was a member of the church's Relief Society general board, which had appointed her to lead the church's newly formed Social Service Department to oversee aid to the needy. She had studied and engaged in social work during Lyman's University of Chicago years. She later served as general secretary of the Relief Society, and then the eighth Relief Society general president from 1940 to 1945.

Richard Lyman was a prolific writer and engineer, contributing both non-technical and scientific articles to various publications. He authored key works on road construction and water flow measurement, receiving the prestigious 1915 J. James R. Croes Gold Medal for his contributions to engineering science. As vice-chairman of the Utah State Road Commission (1909-1918), he played a crucial role in expanding its budget and infrastructure projects. Lyman also served as city engineer of Provo, worked on railroad surveys, and designed waterwork systems across Utah, Idaho, and Wyoming. He held leadership roles in multiple irrigation, power, and insurance companies.

== Apostleship ==
Lyman was ordained an apostle on April 7, 1918. As an apostle, he also served as Assistant Commissioner of the Church Educational System from 1919 to 1924, and as a member of the superintendency of the Young Men's Mutual Improvement Association until 1935. He was also president of the church’s European Mission from 1936 to 1938.

=== Excommunication ===
In 1922, Lyman was assigned to counsel Anna Jacobsen Hegsted, a woman previously excommunicated for polygamy, in preparation her for readmittance to the church. By 1925 the two had formed an attachment, but were unable to marry due to his existing marriage and the church's ban on polygamy. Lyman and Jacobsen exchanged a promise to marry under plural marriage in the next life and continued to maintain what he described as a platonic relationship.

Their separation in his service as mission president in Europe in 1938, caused Lyman upon his return to report, "the long separation and the fiery nearness of her being my prospective plural wife ... led to a temptation I did not resist." By 1943, both individuals were in their seventies.

In 1943, J. Reuben Clark, first counselor in the church's First Presidency and its de facto leader due to church president Heber J. Grant's poor health, became aware of suspicious behavior by Lyman. After the Salt Lake City Police Department, who were at the time enforcing anti-polygamy laws, joined the investigation by church leaders, Lyman and Jacobsen's relationship was substantiated.

The Quorum of the Twelve Apostles convened a disciplinary council on November 12, 1943; Lyman was immediately excommunicated. Next day, the church-owned Deseret News published: "Richard R. Lyman has been excommunicated from the Church of Jesus Christ of Latter-day Saints for violation of the Christian law of chastity."

Lyman's wife, Amy B. Lyman, the general president of the Relief Society at the time of his excommunication, continued to serve for an additional 16 months before her release.

A minority opinion holds that Lyman and Jacobsen's promise to marry functioned as a "plural marriage by mutual covenant," but there is little indication that at any point they considered themselves being actually married. Apostle Spencer W. Kimball recorded regarding the disciplinary council that "He tried to link his sin with polygamy but the evidence gave no corroboration to the story." After the excommunication, J. Reuben Clark worried that Lyman might join the Mormon fundamentalist movement, though this did not occur.

Age 72 at the time of his excommunication, Lyman later returned to the LDS Church through rebaptism on October 27, 1954, at age 83, but he was not reinstated as an apostle. He died in Salt Lake City, Utah on December 31, 1963. His full priesthood blessings were restored posthumously in 1970.

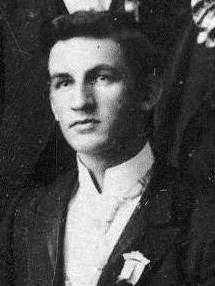
Lyman at age 20

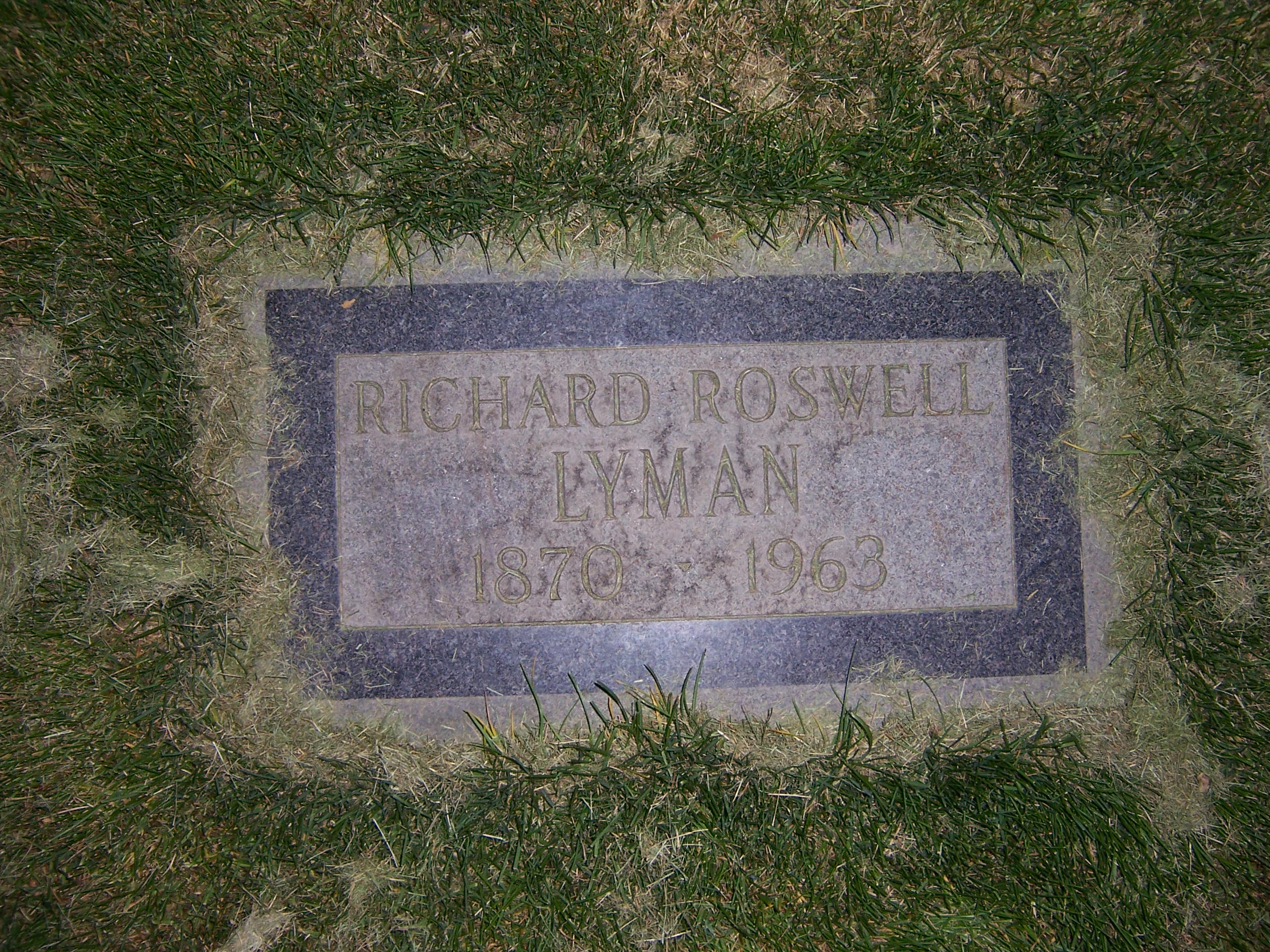
Richard R. Lyman's grave marker

== Notes ==
The Church of Jesus Christ of Latter-day Saints titles
Preceded by Stephen L Richards	Quorum of the Twelve Apostles; April 7, 1918 – November 12, 1943	Succeeded by Melvin J. Ballard
