= J. Wyley Sessions =

American religious leader (1885–1977)

James Wyley Sessions (December 11, 1885 – April 21, 1977) was an American religious leader who was the first Institute of Religion director in the Church of Jesus Christ of Latter-day Saints (LDS Church).

== Biography ==
Sessions was born on December 11, 1885, in Cassia County, Idaho Territory.

== Career ==
He was sent in 1926 by church president Heber J. Grant to head the Institute of Religion in Moscow, Idaho. Sessions later served as the head of the church's mission home in Salt Lake City, Utah for many years.

In 1921, Sessions became the president of the LDS Church's South African Mission, succeeding Nicholas G. Smith. Sessions continued in this position until 1926, when he returned to Utah and almost immediately was sent to direct the institute in Idaho. Over the next decade, Sessions set up Institutes of Religion at several universities in the western United States. He believed that institutes should offer strong academic classes, social interaction, and be housed in permanent and respectable buildings. In 1935, Sessions was serving as the institute director in Pocatello, Idaho.

From 1939 to 1947, Sessions was the head of the Division of Religion at Brigham Young University in Provo, Utah.

Sessions died in Los Angeles, on April 21, 1977, aged 91.
