= Frank B. Woodbury =

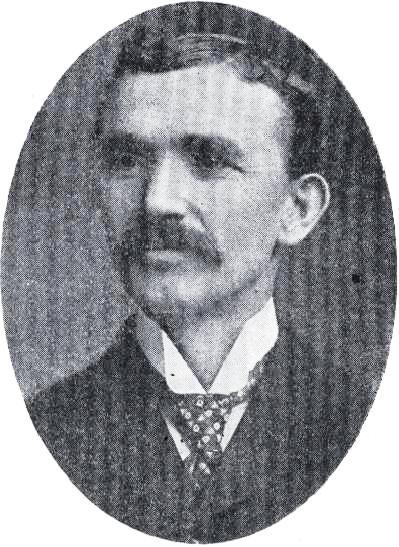

Acting Presiding Patriarch (de facto)
- 1934 – October 8, 1937
- Called by: Heber J. Grant
- Predecessor: Nicholas G. Smith
- Successor: George F. Richards (as Acting Presiding Patriarch)
- End reason: Honorably released

Personal details
- Born: Frank Bartlett Woodbury; December 27, 1867; St. George, Utah Territory, United States
- Died: December 21, 1962 (aged 68)(age 94); Salt Lake City, Utah, United States

Frank Bartlett Woodbury (December 27, 1867 – December 21, 1962) was a leader of and an Acting Presiding Patriarch of the Church of Jesus Christ of Latter-day Saints (LDS Church), one of only three church members to hold this position in church history.

Born in St. George, Utah Territory, to Orin Nelson Woodbury and Ann Cannon, Woodbury served in many capacities in the church on a local level. Some, but not all, LDS Church sources list Woodbury as "Acting Presiding Patriarch" of the church between 1934 and 1937. However, Woodbury was never sustained to this calling in a general conference of the church and it is unknown whether he was ordained or set apart to serve in this office or calling. It is also unclear whether Woodbury was considered by the church to be a general authority. In 1937, church apostle George F. Richards was officially called and sustained as the Acting Patriarch to the church. After his release, Woodbury served as a local stake patriarch in Salt Lake City, Utah.

Woodbury was married to Lily Druce Lambert and was the father of six children: George L., Lillian, Frank Orin, Harvey Charles, Nettie, and Melvin. Woodbury died in Salt Lake City age 94.

== See also ==
- Nicholas G. Smith

== Notes ==
The Church of Jesus Christ of Latter-day Saints titles
Preceded by Nicholas G. Smith	Acting Presiding Patriarch (de facto); 1934–October 8, 1937	Succeeded by George F. Richards as Acting Presiding Patriarch
