= Francis M. Lyman =

American religious leader

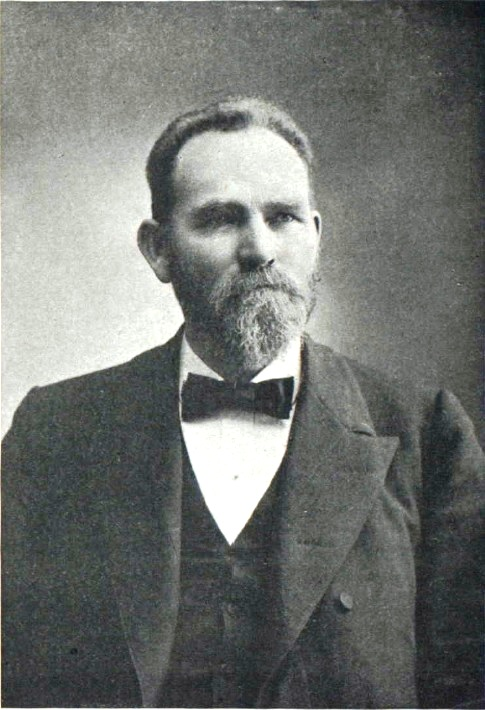

President of the Quorum of the Twelve Apostles
- October 6, 1903 – November 18, 1916
- Predecessor: Brigham Young Jr.
- Successor: Heber J. Grant

Quorum of the Twelve Apostles
- October 27, 1880 – November 18, 1916
- Called by: John Taylor

LDS Church Apostle
- October 27, 1880 – November 18, 1916
- Called by: John Taylor
- Reason: Reorganization of First Presidency
- Reorganization at end of term: Stephen L Richards ordained

Personal details
- Born: Francis Marion Lyman; January 12, 1840; Good Hope, Illinois, United States
- Died: November 18, 1916 (aged 76); Salt Lake City, Utah, United States
- Children: Richard R. Lyman; Rhoda Alice Lyman McBride; Ellen Taylor Lyman Hanks; Francis Marion Lyman Jr.; Edna Jane Lyman Houtz; Anna Louisa Lyman King; Mary Chrisman Lyman Gowans; George Albert Lyman; Lois Victoria Lyman Dunyon; Lucy Smith Lyman Partridge; Ada Alta Lyman; Ida May Lyman Anderson; John Callister Lyman; Hila Olive Lyman; Amy Lyman Merrill; Don Callister Lyman; Clark Lyman; Waldo Wilcken Lyman; Grant Herbert Lyman; Florence Lyman Christensen; Rudger Clawson Lyman; Helen Lyman Morr
- Signature

Francis Marion Lyman (January 12, 1840 – November 18, 1916) was a member of the Quorum of the Twelve Apostles of the Church of Jesus Christ of Latter-day Saints (LDS Church). He was the President of the Quorum of the Twelve from 1903 until his death.

Lyman's father and son were also apostles in the church: his father was Amasa M. Lyman and his son was Richard R. Lyman. Both his father and son were excommunicated from the church while serving as apostles (although they were later re-baptized).

== Early life ==
Francis M. Lyman was born as the first son of Amasa M. Lyman and Louisa Maria Tanner in Good Hope, Illinois. That spring, the family moved to Iowa. About one year later, they moved to Nauvoo, Illinois, to be with the main gathering of Latter Day Saints. In 1843, they moved again to Alquina, Indiana. In 1844, after the death of Joseph Smith, they moved back to Nauvoo.

Lyman's father left with the first group to travel on the Mormon Exodus to the West. His family moved to Winter Quarters in June 1846 under the care of his maternal grandfather. His family set out to the Salt Lake Valley in 1848. Though only 8 years old, Lyman helped drive a yoke of cattle and the wagon. He was baptized by his father in the Elkhorn River on July 1, 1848, and arrived in the Salt Lake Valley on October 19, 1848.

By 1851, when Lyman was 11 years old, his father and Charles C. Rich purchased land in San Bernardino, California. Lyman helped drive the animals from Salt Lake to southern California. Lyman was present at the laying of the cornerstone of the Salt Lake Temple on April 6, 1853.

== Adult life and service ==
In 1856, at about 16 years of age, Lyman received the Melchizedek priesthood and was ordained an elder by his father. In 1857, he was called on a mission to Great Britain. He was stopped at Salt Lake City and told to turn back to bring the settlers in California to Utah. The outbreak of the Utah War had prevented his mission.

Lyman married Rhoda Ann Taylor on November 18, 1857.

In 1859, Lyman and his family settled in Farmington, Utah. He was ordained as a seventy on January 7, 1860, by John S. Gleason. He built a cabin in Beaver, Utah, for his wife and son, and he left on his delayed mission in the spring of 1860.

== Mission in England ==
En route to New York City, Lyman stopped in Kirtland, Ohio, and was shown through the Kirtland Temple by Martin Harris. Lyman left the United States through the port of New York and arrived by steamer in Liverpool, England, on July 27, 1860.

Lyman served as a missionary for roughly two years. Upon release from his mission, he accompanied about 800 immigrants back to the United States; they arrived in New York on June 25, 1862, where he was appointed the president of the group. By early July, they had arrived in Florence, Nebraska. Lyman was reunited with his wife in Beaver, Utah, in the middle of October.

== Fillmore ==
In March 1863, LDS Church president Brigham Young asked Lyman to settle in Fillmore, Utah. The next fourteen years of his life were spent there, where he engaged himself in leadership in church, politics, business, and manufacturing. Among his positions and honors were:

- assistant assessor of United States internal revenue
- lieutenant-colonel of the first regiment of militia in the Pauvan District at 25
- member of the House of the General Assembly of the State of Deseret
- a member of the 17th, 18th, 22nd and 23rd sessions of the Utah Territorial legislature
- county clerk and recorder
- superintendent of schools
- prosecuting attorney

When a stake was formed in Fillmore, Lyman was ordained to the office of high priest. Later he was called to be a member of the stake high council.

On October 4, 1869, Lyman married his first plural wife, Clara Caroline Callister. Her grandfather was John Smith, Joseph Smith's uncle. Lyman and Callister's son Richard R. Lyman would serve as an apostle from 1918 to 1943.

Lyman was called on a second mission to England and left Salt Lake City on October 20, 1873, arriving in Liverpool on November 12. During this mission, he also visited and proselytized in Wales, Scotland, Denmark, Germany, Switzerland, and France. He returned to Utah with 300 immigrating Latter-day Saints in October 1875.

== Tooele County ==
In April 1877, Lyman was called to preside over the Tooele Stake, which was organized June 24, 1877, in Tooele County, Utah. He involved himself in the politics of that county as well. By August 1878, Lyman was elected county recorder and representative to the territorial legislature.

Since 1874, Tooele County had been led by politicians of the Liberal Party and was nicknamed the Tooele Republic. In 1878, the legislature passed a resolution providing for the registration of voters. After allegations of corruption and excessive spending by the Liberal Party, which left the county in debt, the People's Party won the election of 1878. However, Liberal Party officials refused to count the votes and declared themselves the winners of the election. Lyman was key in challenging the election results. After the case was heard by the courts, the People's Party was declared the winner on March 29, 1879. As a result of his victory in this instance, Lyman had earned a reputation for fighting government corruption.

== Apostleship ==
At the October General Conference held on October 10, 1880, Lyman and John Henry Smith were sustained as members of the Quorum of the Twelve Apostles. Because he was absent from the conference on a mission to survey parts of southern Utah, Nevada, and Arizona, Lyman was ordained an apostle on October 27 by church president John Taylor.

Lyman visited nearly every town in the West with members of the church during his apostleship. He also maintained a detailed daily record of his business as an apostle.

In early 1883, Lyman served a mission to the Native American people of the Uintah and Ouray Reservation in Utah. With his company of men, Lyman set out and preached vigorously. The government agents were receptive and allowed them to preach freely. Members of the Utes had joined them, and they were most effective in preaching to their fellow natives. Many Native Americans received the Book of Mormon and their preaching and were baptized. Lyman returned to Provo, Utah, on May 28, 1883.

Lyman was called to minister over the European Mission in 1901. He set about several key reforms and expanded the number of mission homes throughout Europe. In 1903, Lyman and Joseph J. Cannon visited and preached in Finland and Russia.

In spring 1902, Lyman visited Palestine and offered up a solemn prayer on the Mount of Olives. In 1903, Brigham Young, Jr. died, making Lyman the President of the Quorum of the Twelve Apostles. He returned to Utah in 1904. Soon after returning home, he went to Washington, D.C., to testify in the Reed Smoot hearings before the Senate Committee on Privileges and Elections.

Lyman died in his home of pneumonia on November 18, 1916. Stephen L Richards was called to replace him in the Quorum of the Twelve after his death. Heber J. Grant replaced him as President of the Quorum of the Twelve.

== See also ==
- Richard R. Lyman, son

== Notes ==
Religious titles
Preceded by Brigham Young, Jr.	President of the Quorum of the Twelve Apostles; April 11, 1903 – November 18, 1916	Succeeded by Heber J. Grant
Preceded by Moses Thatcher	Quorum of the Twelve Apostles; October 27, 1880 – November 18, 1916	Succeeded by John Henry Smith
