= Anthon H. Lund =

Politician and religious leader (1844–1921)

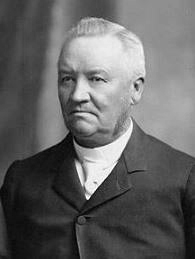

President of the Quorum of the Twelve Apostles (with Rudger Clawson as Acting President)
- November 23, 1918 – March 2, 1921
- Predecessor: Heber J. Grant
- Successor: Rudger Clawson

First Counselor in the First Presidency
- November 23, 1918 – March 2, 1921
- Called by: Heber J. Grant

First Counselor in the First Presidency
- April 7, 1910 – November 19, 1918
- Called by: Joseph F. Smith
- End reason: Death of Joseph F. Smith

Second Counselor in the First Presidency
- October 17, 1901 – April 7, 1910
- Called by: Joseph F. Smith
- End reason: Called as First Counselor in the First Presidency

Quorum of the Twelve Apostles
- October 7, 1889 – October 17, 1901
- Called by: Wilford Woodruff
- End reason: Called as Second Counselor in the First Presidency

LDS Church Apostle
- October 7, 1889 – March 2, 1921
- Called by: Wilford Woodruff
- Reason: Excommunication of Albert Carrington; death of John Taylor and reorganization of the First Presidency; death of Erastus Snow
- Reorganization at end of term: Anthony W. Ivins added to First Presidency; John A. Widtsoe ordained

Personal details
- Born: Anthon Henrik Lund; May 15, 1844; Aalborg, Denmark
- Died: March 2, 1921 (aged 76); Salt Lake City, Utah, U.S.
- Resting place: Salt Lake City Cemetery; 40.7772°N 111.8580°W
- Spouse(s): Sarah Ann Peterson
- Children: including: Anthony C. Lund

Anthon Henrik Lund (May 15, 1844 – March 2, 1921) was a member of the Quorum of the Twelve Apostles and the First Presidency of the Church of Jesus Christ of Latter-day Saints (LDS Church) and a prominent Utah leader.

== Early life ==
Lund was born in Aalborg, Denmark, to unmarried parents; he was raised by his maternal grandmother until his emigration to the United States in 1862. Lund's mother died before he turned four years old. At that time, his father was serving in the war over Schleswig-Holstein. Lund was baptized a member of the LDS Church at age 12; after his baptism, he assisted the missionaries and fulfilled his duties as first a teacher and then a priest by preaching with them. In 1862, Lund immigrated with his grandmother to the United States. He arrived in Utah Territory in September and settled in Sanpete County, following the tradition of many Scandinavian immigrants.

In 1864, Lund was a teamster in a down-and-back company bringing additional emigrants to Utah. The next winter, he served as a school teacher. In 1865, he responded to Brigham Young's request that men come to Salt Lake City and learn to be telegraph operators. In 1866, Lund became the telegraph operator for the Mount Pleasant station, where he was ordained as a seventy by Peter Madsen Peel. He was also the first apostle to not practice plural marriage since the early days of the church.

== Church and political service ==
From 1884 to 1885, Lund served as president of the church's Scandinavian Mission.

Lund served in the Utah Territorial Legislature. He introduced the legislation that resulted in the founding of Utah State Agricultural College, which later became Utah State University. Lund served on the Utah Capitol Grounds Committee when it was formed in 1888.

Lund became a member of the Quorum of the Twelve Apostles on October 7, 1889. Church president John Taylor had died two years earlier. Lund was ordained along with two other apostles, Marriner W. Merrill and Abraham H. Cannon.

At the time of his ordination, Lund was the only monogamist in the Quorum of the Twelve. His wife was Sarah Ann Peterson, who he had married in 1870. In 1891, Lund became president of the Manti Temple.

From 1893 until 1896, Lund was the president of the European Mission. He made a journey to the Ottoman Empire in 1897, where he organized the Turkish Mission and looked into sought out a gathering place for the primarily Armenian church members in that mission.

In 1899, Lund laid and dedicated the southeast cornerstone of the Sanpete Stake Academy (now Snow College). That same year, Lund delivered a general conference sermon in which he emphasized that it was no longer church policy to encourage its members to emigrate to the western United States.

In 1900, Lund became the superintendent of church religion classes.

Church president Joseph F. Smith selected Lund as second counselor in the First Presidency on October 17, 1901. He served in that position until April 7, 1910, when Smith called him as first counselor, to replace John R. Winder, who had died in March. Lund assumed a myriad of duties, including heading various church agencies and again serving as a temple president. Lund also served as a member of several writing committees to revise the church's standard works and other publications. He participated in numerous businesses in Utah, including the Hotel Utah, the Amalgamated Sugar Company (1914–20), and ZCMI. Lund was the first member of the Quorum of the Twelve Apostles and of the First Presidency whose native language was not English.

While he was a member of the First Presidency, Lund also fulfilled civic roles. He replaced John Henry Smith as a member of the Utah Capitol Commission after Smith died.

After the death of Joseph F. Smith in 1918, new church president Heber J. Grant retained Lund as first counselor in the First Presidency. At that time, Lund also became President of the Quorum of the Twelve Apostles.

Lund served as Church Historian from 1900 to 1921. While in this office, he supervised the movement of the office and its materials to the new Church Administration Building in 1917.

Lund served as president of the Genealogical Society of Utah and was the first editor of the Utah Historical and Genealogical Magazine. From 1911 to 1921, Lund was the president of the Salt Lake Temple.

== Death ==
Lund died in Salt Lake City on March 2, 1921, from a duodenal ulcer, an ailment that plagued him for many years. He was buried at Salt Lake City Cemetery. John A. Widtsoe was called to the Quorum of the Twelve after his death.

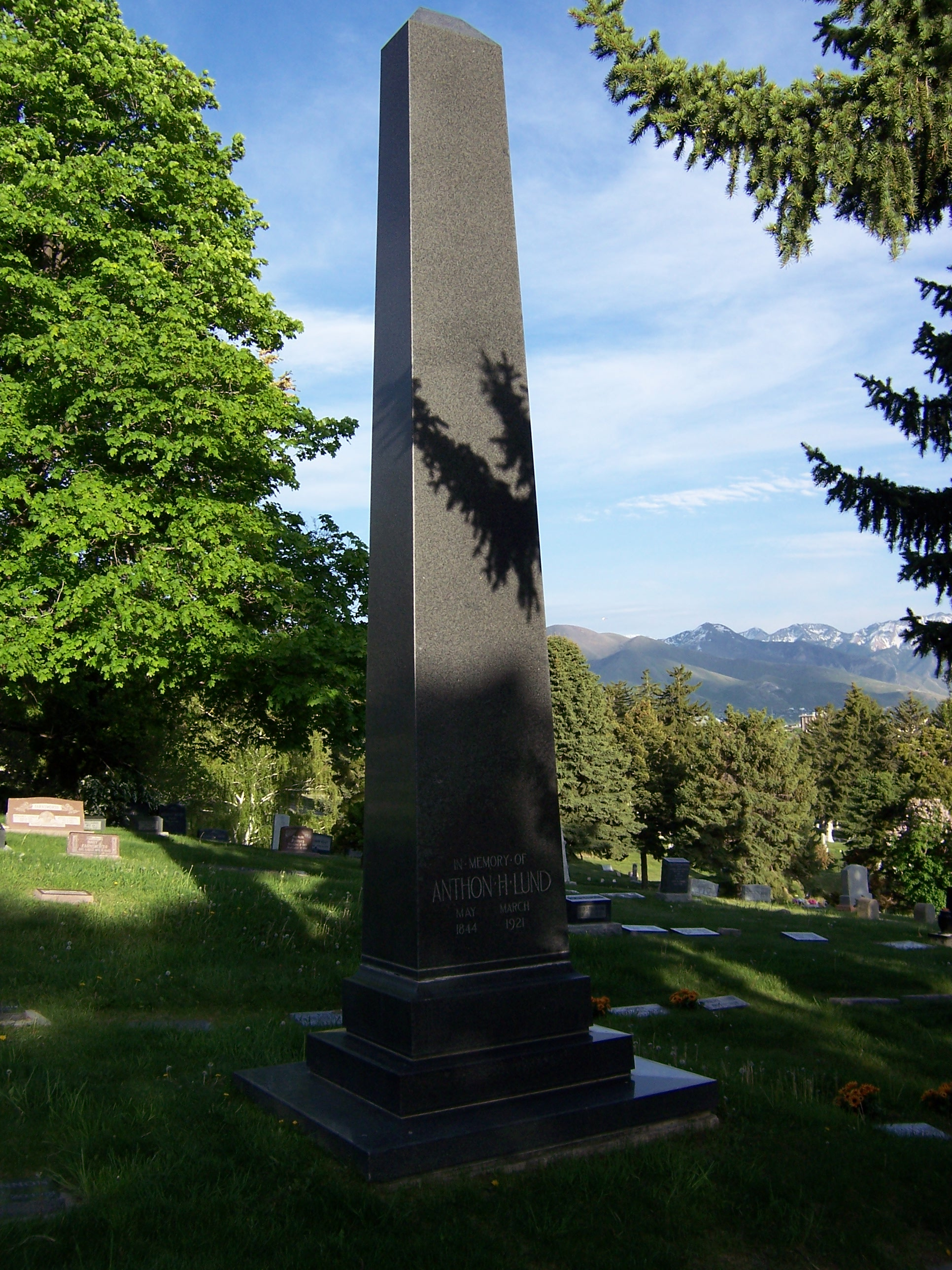
Front view of grave marker

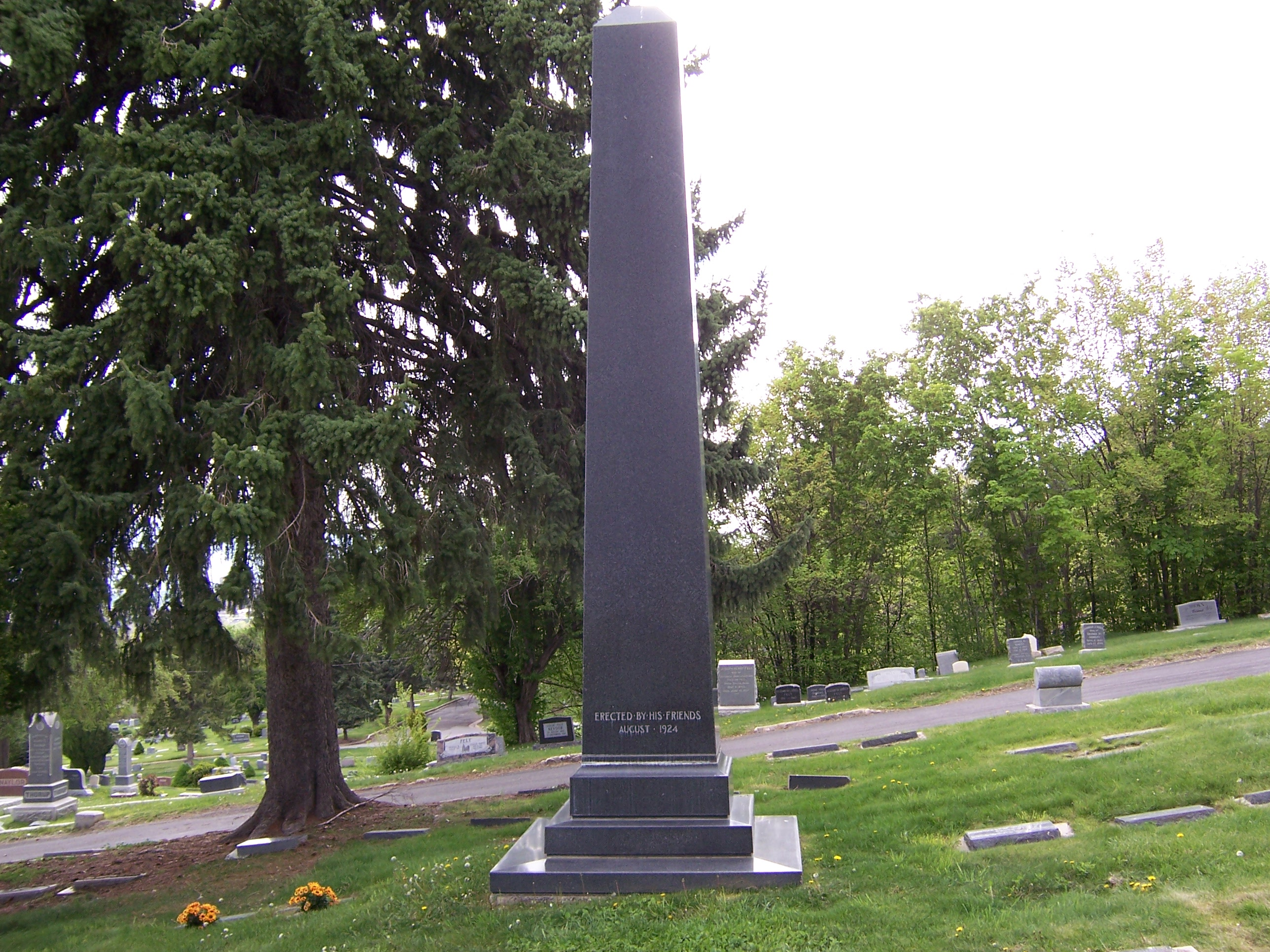
Back view of grave marker

== Legacy ==
- Utah State University's mathematics hall is named for Lund.
- Lund, Nevada, is named for Lund.

== See also ==
- Good Neighbor policy (LDS Church)

== Notes ==
The Church of Jesus Christ of Latter-day Saints titles
Preceded by Heber J. Grant	President of the Quorum of the Twelve Apostles; November 23, 1918 – March 2, 1921	Succeeded by Rudger Clawson
Preceded by John R. Winder	First Counselor in the First Presidency; November 23, 1918 – March 2, 1921; April 7, 1910 – November 19, 1918	Succeeded by Charles W. Penrose
Preceded by Rudger Clawson	Second Counselor in the First Presidency; October 17, 1901 – April 7, 1910	Succeeded by John Henry Smith
Preceded by Marriner W. Merrill	Quorum of the Twelve Apostles; October 7, 1889 – October 17, 1901	Succeeded by Abraham H. Cannon
