= Nicholas G. Smith =

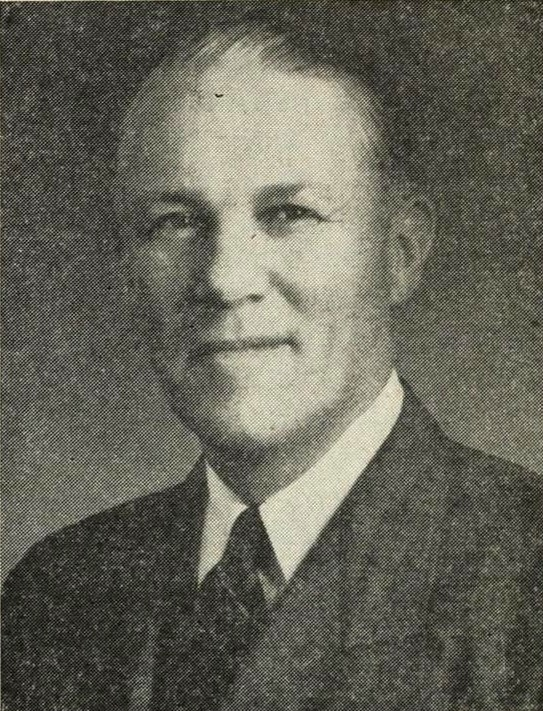

Acting Presiding Patriarch (de facto)
- February 4, 1932 – 1934
- Predecessor: Hyrum G. Smith
- Successor: Frank B. Woodbury
- End reason: Honorably released

Assistant to the Quorum of the Twelve Apostles
- April 6, 1941 – October 27, 1945

Personal details
- Born: Nicholas Groesbeck Smith; June 20, 1881; Salt Lake City, Utah Territory, United States
- Died: October 27, 1945 (aged 64); Salt Lake City, Utah, United States
- Cause of death: coronary occlusion
- Resting place: Salt Lake City Cemetery; 40°46′37.92″N 111°51′28.8″W
- Spouse(s): Florence Gay
- Children: Girard Gay; John Henry; Stanford Groesbeck; Nicholas Groesbeck Jr.
- Parents: John Henry Smith; Josephine Groesbeck
- Relatives: George Albert Smith (half-brother)

Nicholas Groesbeck Smith (June 20, 1881 – October 27, 1945) was a general authority of the Church of Jesus Christ of Latter-day Saints (LDS Church). Born in Salt Lake City, Utah Territory, Smith was the son of LDS Church apostle John Henry Smith and Josephine Groesbeck. At age three, he went to England with his parents, where his father was serving as a church mission president.

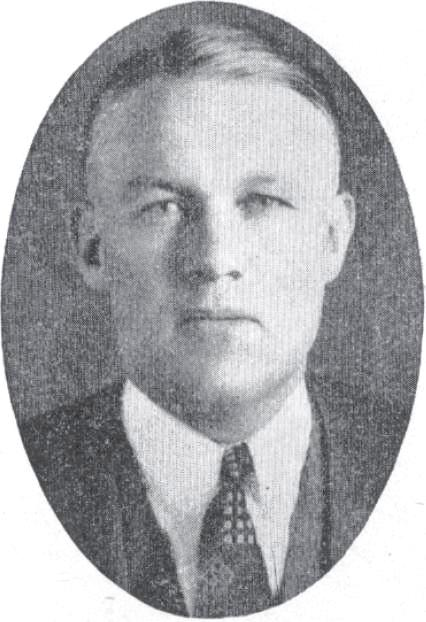
Smith ca. 1936

Smith was baptized by his father on his eighth birthday. From 1902 to 1905, Smith served as a LDS Church missionary in the Netherlands. During part of the time he was on his mission he was president of the Amsterdam District of the church.

Smith was married to Florence Gay and was the father of four sons: Girard Gay, John Henry, Stanford Groesbeck, and Nicholas Groesbeck Jr.

In 1913, Smith was called by church president Joseph F. Smith to serve as president of the South African Mission of the church. He served in this capacity until 1921. He was succeeded in this position by J. Wyley Sessions.

Some LDS Church sources state that Smith served as Acting Presiding Patriarch of the LDS Church between 1932 and 1934. However, Smith was never sustained to this calling in a general conference of the LDS Church. It is unknown whether he was ordained or set apart to serve in this office or calling.

On April 6, 1941, Smith was called by church president Heber J. Grant to be one of the first five Assistants to the Quorum of the Twelve Apostles, a position which he held until his death in Salt Lake City from a coronary occlusion. He was buried at Salt Lake City Cemetery.

== Notes ==
The Church of Jesus Christ of Latter-day Saints titles
| Preceded by Hyrum G. Smith as Presiding Patriarch | Acting Presiding Patriarch (de facto); February 4, 1932–1934 | Succeeded by Frank B. Woodbury |
