= Charles W. Penrose =

American Mormon leader (1832–1925)

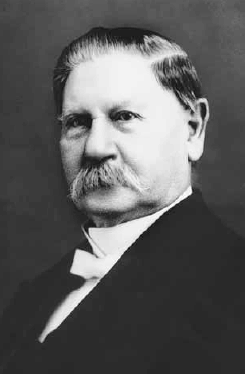

First Counselor in the First Presidency
- March 10, 1921 – May 16, 1925
- Called by: Heber J. Grant
- Predecessor: Anthon H. Lund
- Successor: Anthony W. Ivins

Second Counselor in the First Presidency
- November 23, 1918 – March 10, 1921
- Called by: Heber J. Grant
- Successor: Anthony W. Ivins
- End reason: Called as First Counselor in the First Presidency

Second Counselor in the First Presidency
- December 7, 1911 – November 19, 1918
- Called by: Joseph F. Smith
- Predecessor: John Henry Smith
- End reason: Death of Joseph F. Smith; dissolution of First Presidency

Quorum of the Twelve Apostles
- July 7, 1904 – December 7, 1911
- Called by: Joseph F. Smith
- End reason: Called as Second Counselor in the First Presidency

LDS Church Apostle
- July 7, 1904 – May 16, 1925
- Called by: Joseph F. Smith
- Reason: Death of Abraham O. Woodruff
- Reorganization at end of term: No apostles ordained

Personal details
- Born: Charles William Penrose; February 4, 1832; London, England
- Died: May 16, 1925 (aged 93); Salt Lake City, Utah, United States
- Cause of death: Chronic prostatitis
- Resting place: Salt Lake City Cemetery; 40.777°N 111.858°W
- Spouse(s): Lucetta Stratford
- Children: 15

Charles William Penrose (February 4, 1832 – May 16, 1925) was a member of the Quorum of the Twelve Apostles of the Church of Jesus Christ of Latter-day Saints (LDS Church) from 1904 to 1911. Penrose was also a member of the First Presidency, serving as a counselor to church presidents Joseph F. Smith and Heber J. Grant from 1911 until his death.

== Life ==
Penrose was born in Camberwell London, England. It is said that he learned to read the Bible by the age of four. Penrose was introduced to the LDS Church and baptized at the age of eighteen on May 14, 1850, in London. He also met and married his wife, Lucetta Stratford, in London. The couple had 15 children.

== Mission ==
After joining the LDS Church, Penrose was called on a mission, preaching throughout England. It was while on this mission he wrote the hymn O, Ye Mountains High. For the next seven years he primarily served as a missionary in agricultural areas. During this first mission he wrote "Up, Awake, Ye Defenders of Zion" as a result of the Utah War. In 1868, Penrose became the president of the church's London Conference (equivalent of a modern LDS district). He was then made president of the Cheltenham Pastorate, consisting of multiple conferences. He was then placed in charge of the Birmingham Pastorate, presiding over four conferences in the West Midlands of England.

Penrose wrote a set of mission tracts entitled "Rays of Living Light" which were widely used until about the middle of the 20th century.

== Utah Territory ==
In 1861, Penrose emigrated to Utah Territory. After arriving in Utah he settled in Farmington. The cabin the Penrose family lived at in Farmington is now a museum of the Daughters of the Utah Pioneers. Besides working as a farmer and hauling logs, was also a school teacher.

In 1864, Ezra T. Benson convinced Penrose to move to Logan, Utah, where he continued to work as a farmer and school teacher. Penrose was asked to return to England as a missionary in 1865. While on this mission he published several songs and hymns, including "Beautiful Zion for Me", which was written on the occasion of Brigham Young, Jr. leaving for Utah. For about the first year of his mission he preached to coal workers in Lancashire. For the next two years he was in the office of the Millennial Star and was an assistant to the mission president Franklin D. Richards.

== Farming and retailing ==
Upon Penrose's return to Utah in 1868, he returned to Logan, where he was involved in farming and retailing. He formed a partnership, and then the Logan Cooperative Mercantile Institution, of which he was secretary-treasurer and bookkeeper. That failed and he ended up leaving Logan. While in Logan, Penrose also served as a member of the LDS stake high council.

== Publishing ==
He next settled in Ogden, Utah, on the advice of Franklin D. Richards. Here he became involved in newspaper publishing, publishing the Ogden Junction. He also was a prominent public speaker in the community. Penrose also served as a member of the city council in Ogden. When the Weber Stake was organized Penrose was called as a member of the high council.

In 1877, Penrose became the assistant editor of the LDS Church-owned Deseret News in Salt Lake City, working under George Q. Cannon. Penrose was known for his writing, including missionary tracts and lyrics of Latter-day Saint hymns, including "God of Our Fathers", "O Ye Mountains High", and "Up, Awake, Ye Defenders of Zion". In 1880, Penrose became the editor-in-chief of the Deseret News.

== Delegate ==
In 1872 Penrose was a delegate for Weber County, Utah in the state constitutional convention of that year. While the convention wrote a state constitution, this one was rejected by the U.S. congress and Utah did not at that time become a state.

Penrose served in the Utah Territorial Legislature, first being elected from Ogden in 1874. After moving to Salt Lake City, he was again elected to the state legislature in 1879, elected to fill a vacancy caused by the death of Albert P. Rockwood. In 1880, Penrose introduced a bill in the state legislature, largely at the urging of Emmeline B. Wells, that would have allowed women to serve in all public offices in the territory. This bill passed the legislature but was vetoed by the governor of Utah Territory. Penrose served as a member of the Utah State Constitutional Convention of 1882 as well.

In 1884 Penrose was called a counselor to Angus M. Cannon in the presidency of the Salt Lake Stake.

Penrose, along with George Reynolds and John R. Winder, edited the 1890 Manifesto and prepared it for publication after being given the initial text by Wilford Woodruff.

== Professor ==
Penrose was a professor of theology at Brigham Young Academy from 1897 to 1899 and again in 1901 and 1902.

Penrose was made a member of the LDS Council of 50 in 1882. An arrest warrant was issued for him on polygamy charges in December 1884. In January 1885 he traveled to Washington, D.C. where he met with Grover Cleveland, among others. Some of these meetings were done jointly with Brigham Young Jr. Penrose then served a mission in England for about six months. He presided over the London Conference, and also worked closely with the mission president, Daniel H. Wells. Penrose preached in all the lands of the United Kingdom, as well as in Germany, Switzerland, Sweden and Denmark while on this mission. In late 1889 Penrose was pardoned by Cleveland for polygamy, and shortly after went to prison for contempt of court for refusing to testify against other polygamists.

== Salt Lake ==
In 1892, Penrose left the Deseret News and joined the staff of the Salt Lake Herald. He also became an assistant historian of the LDS Church. That same year he was a delegate to the Democratic Party national convention in Chicago. In 1894, Penrose was one of the initial directors of the Genealogical Society of Utah. He became vice president of the society in 1909 and president in 1921, serving in that position until his death. In 1898 Penrose returned to the Deseret News as editor.

== Apostle ==
Penrose was called to the Quorum of the Twelve Apostles and ordained an apostle on July 7, 1904. He was called to fill a vacancy in the quorum caused by the death of Abraham O. Woodruff. From 1906 until 1910 Penrose served as president of the LDS Church's European Mission. On December 7, 1911, Penrose became Second Counselor to Joseph F. Smith in the church's First Presidency; he replaced John Henry Smith, who died. James E. Talmage filled the vacancy in the Quorum of the Twelve caused by Penrose's being called into the First Presidency. After Joseph F. Smith's death in 1918, Penrose was retained as Second Counselor by new church president Heber J. Grant. On March 10, 1921, Penrose became First Counselor in the First Presidency, following the death of Anthon H. Lund, who had died eight days earlier.

== Family ==
Penrose first married during his first mission to Lucetta Stratford in 1855. They had originally requested permission to marry in 1854 but it was not granted at that time by mission leaders. LDS missionaries marrying was allowed in the 19th century and in the cases of single missionaries about to leave the mission for a long trek to Utah at times even encouraged. Charles and Lucetta had 15 children, although only 7 survived infancy.

In 1863, Penrose married Louise Elizabeth Lusty. They eventually had 11 children, eight of whom lived to adulthood.

Penrose was married to Romania B. Pratt Penrose in 1886.

== Death ==
Penrose served in the First Presidency until his death in Salt Lake City from chronic prostatitis. In the Improvement Era on the occasion of his death George H. Brimhall published a poem praising Penrose for his works of hymns. He was buried at Salt Lake City Cemetery.

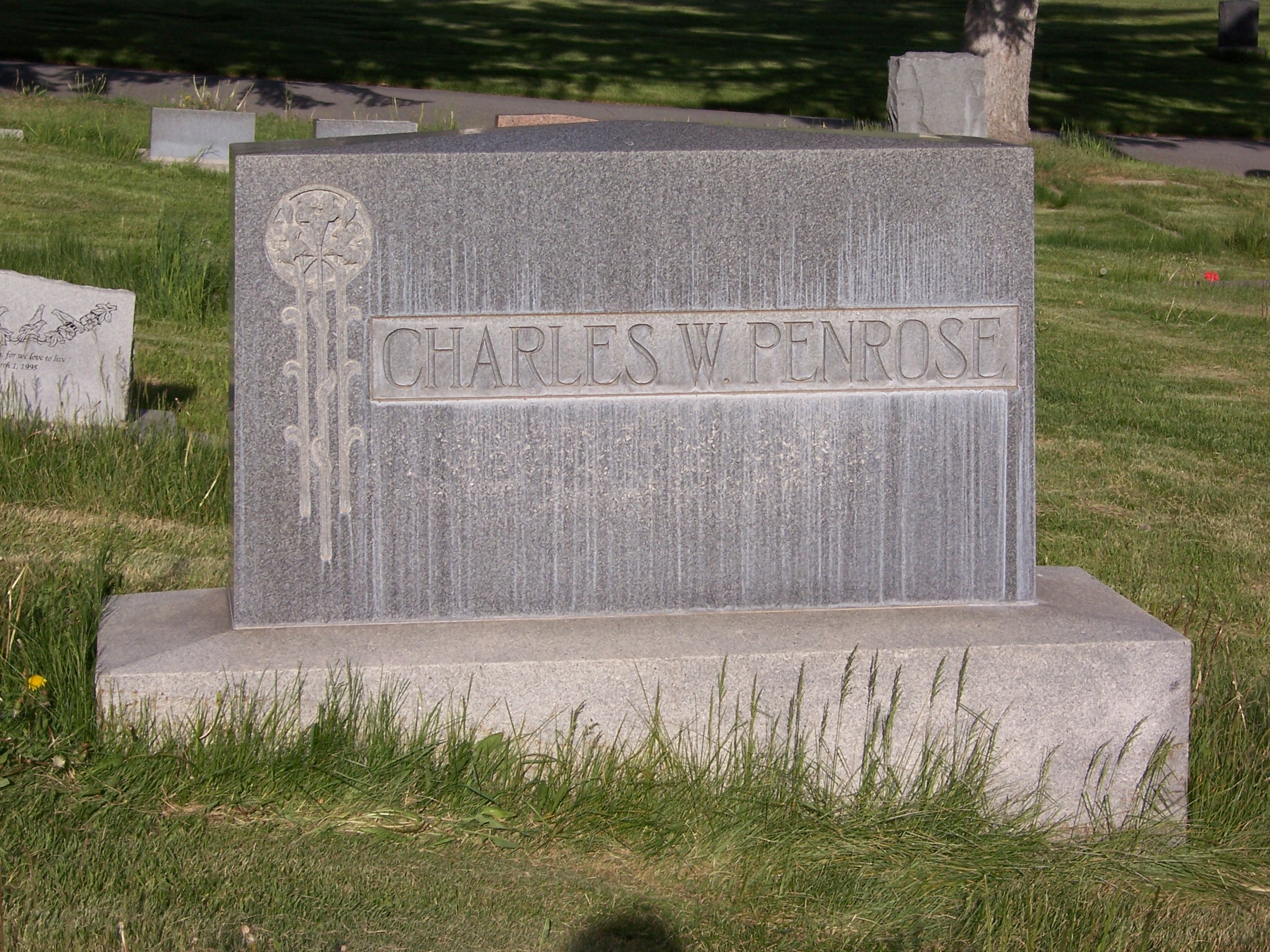
Grave marker of Penrose.

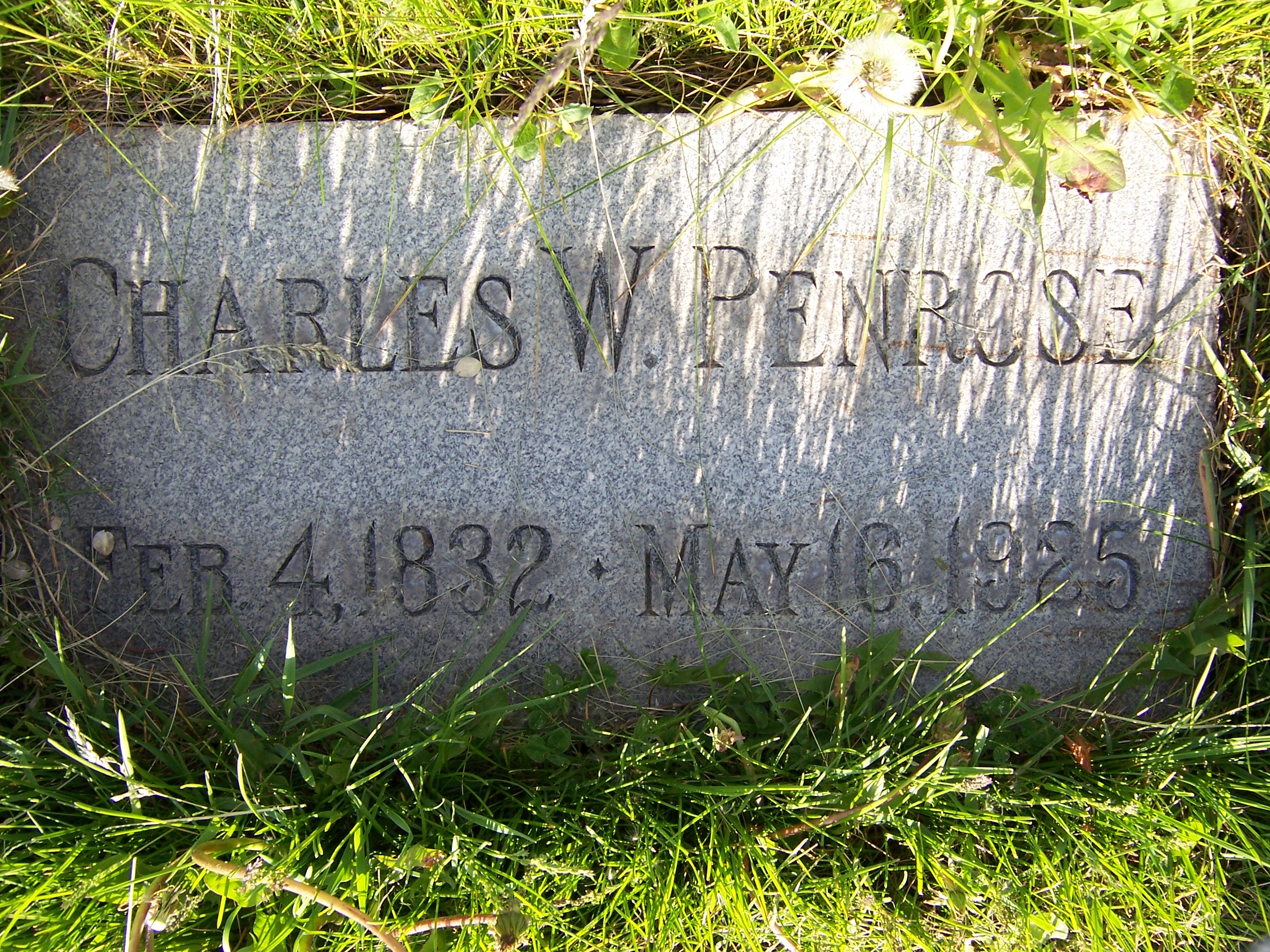
Grave stone of Penrose

== Hymns ==
Some of Penrose's poems were put to music and became LDS Church hymns. Penrose's "Up, Awake, Ye Defenders of Zion"—originally a militant hymn containing references to trials of Latter-day Saints in the central United States and the threatening United States government (ironically set to the melody for "Columbia, Gem of the Ocean")—became an anthem for Latter-day Saints during the difficulties preceding and during the Utah War of 1857–58.

Some of Penrose's lyrics appear in the LDS Church's 1985 hymnal, including:

- "God of Our Fathers, We Come Unto Thee"
- "O Ye Mountains High" (with modified lyrics, 1948)
- "School Thy Feelings"
- "Up, Awake, Ye Defenders of Zion" (with modified lyrics, 1985)

== Notes ==
The Church of Jesus Christ of Latter-day Saints titles
Preceded by Anthon H. Lund	First Counselor in the First Presidency; March 10, 1921 – May 16, 1925	Succeeded by Anthony W. Ivins
Preceded by John Henry Smith	Second Counselor in the First Presidency; December 7, 1911 – November 19, 1918; November 23, 1918 – March 2, 1921	Succeeded by Anthony W. Ivins
Preceded by George Albert Smith	Quorum of the Twelve Apostles; July 7, 1904 – December 7, 1911	Succeeded by George F. Richards
