= John Henry Smith =

American politician and religious leader (1848–1911)

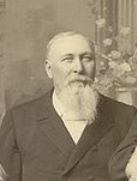

Second Counselor in the First Presidency
- April 7, 1910 – October 13, 1911
- Called by: Joseph F. Smith
- Predecessor: Anthon H. Lund
- Successor: Charles W. Penrose

Quorum of the Twelve Apostles
- October 27, 1880 – April 7, 1910
- Called by: John Taylor
- End reason: Called as Second Counselor in the First Presidency

LDS Church Apostle
- October 27, 1880 – October 13, 1911
- Called by: John Taylor
- Reason: Reorganization of First Presidency
- Reorganization at end of term: Charles W. Penrose added to First Presidency; James E. Talmage ordained

Personal details
- Born: John Henry Smith; September 18, 1848; Council Bluffs, Iowa, U.S.
- Died: October 13, 1911 (aged 63); Salt Lake City, Utah, U.S.
- Resting place: Salt Lake City Cemetery; 40.777°N 111.858°W
- Spouse(s): Sarah Farr; Josephine G. Smith
- Children: 19
- Parents: George A. Smith; Sarah Ann Libby
- Signature

John Henry Smith (September 18, 1848 – October 13, 1911) was a member of the Quorum of the Twelve Apostles and the First Presidency of the Church of Jesus Christ of Latter-day Saints (LDS Church). He was a prominent politician in Utah and played an important role in the transition from Utah as a territory to a state of the United States.

== LDS Church service ==
From 1867 until 1869 Smith served as a counselor in the bishopric of the Provo 4th Ward, which at that time covered all Provo north of Center Street and east of 1st East.

In 1874 and 1875, Smith served as a missionary in Europe. He spent most of this mission in England, particularly in and around the city of Birmingham.

From 1875 to 1880, Smith was the bishop of the Salt Lake 17th Ward.

In October 1880, LDS Church president John Taylor called Smith to be a member of the Quorum of the Twelve Apostles. On October 27 of that year, he was ordained an apostle by Wilford Woodruff, who at that time was the quorum president. Smith served in that capacity until the death of First Presidency member John R. Winder in 1910; he was then asked by church president Joseph F. Smith to take Winder's place as a member of the First Presidency. John Henry Smith served in this capacity until his death the next year.

== Political contributions ==
Smith was a prominent Republican in Utah politics. In 1882, he was elected a member of the Utah Territorial Legislature. Smith was unanimously elected by the 107 delegates to be the Chair of the Utah Constitutional Convention that was held between March 4 and May 8, 1895. The result of the convention was a draft Constitution for the proposed State of Utah, which was accepted by the United States Congress in 1896 when Utah officially became a state of the United States.

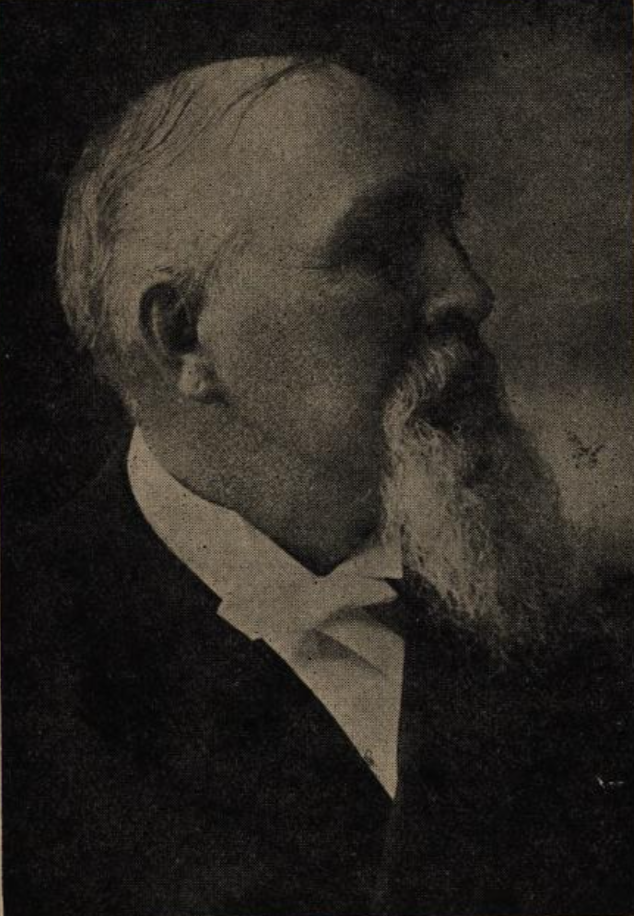
Portrait of Smith

== Marriage and family ==
Born in Carbunca, Iowa, Smith was the son of Sarah Ann Libby and LDS Church apostle and First Presidency member, George A. Smith. He came west to Utah in a company co-led by his father in 1849, arriving in Salt Lake City on October 27, 1849. His mother died in 1851.

Smith practiced plural marriage and was the father of 19 children. One of his sons was George Albert Smith, who became an LDS apostle and served as the church's 8th president. Smith and George Albert Smith are the only father and son pair to have been members of the Quorum of the Twelve at the same time, serving together from 1903 to 1910. Smith was also the father of Nicholas G. Smith.

Smith's first wife, Sarah Farr, was the daughter of Lorin Farr, who was mayor of Ogden, Utah. Smith's second wife, Josephine Groesbeck, spent 1888 until 1896 in exile in Manassa, Colorado, to avoid being called as a witness in a criminal unlawful cohabitation trial against Smith.

== Death ==
Smith died of a pulmonary hemorrhage in Salt Lake City and was buried at Salt Lake City Cemetery.

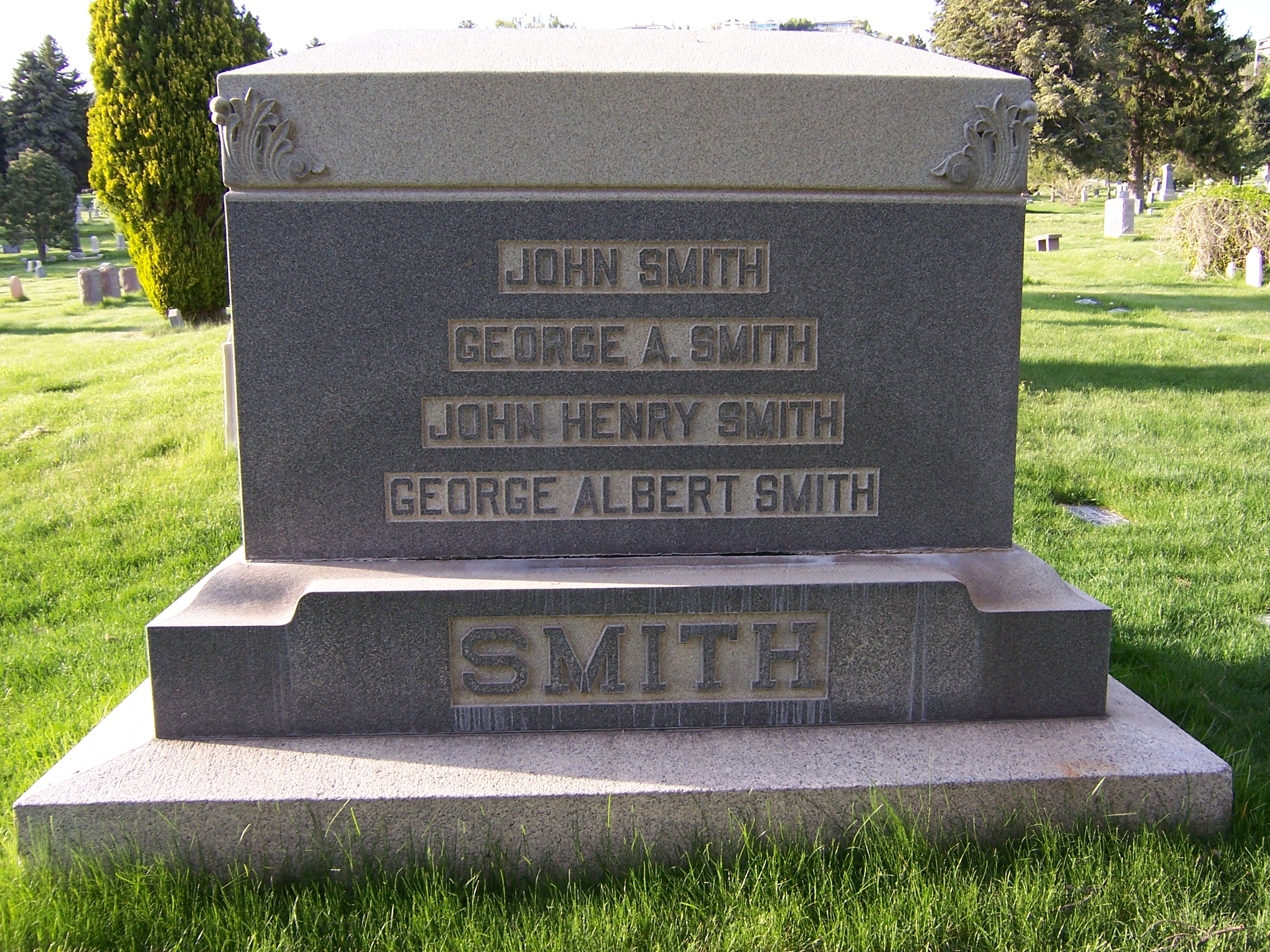
Monument to four generations of a branch of the Smith family, prominent in LDS history.

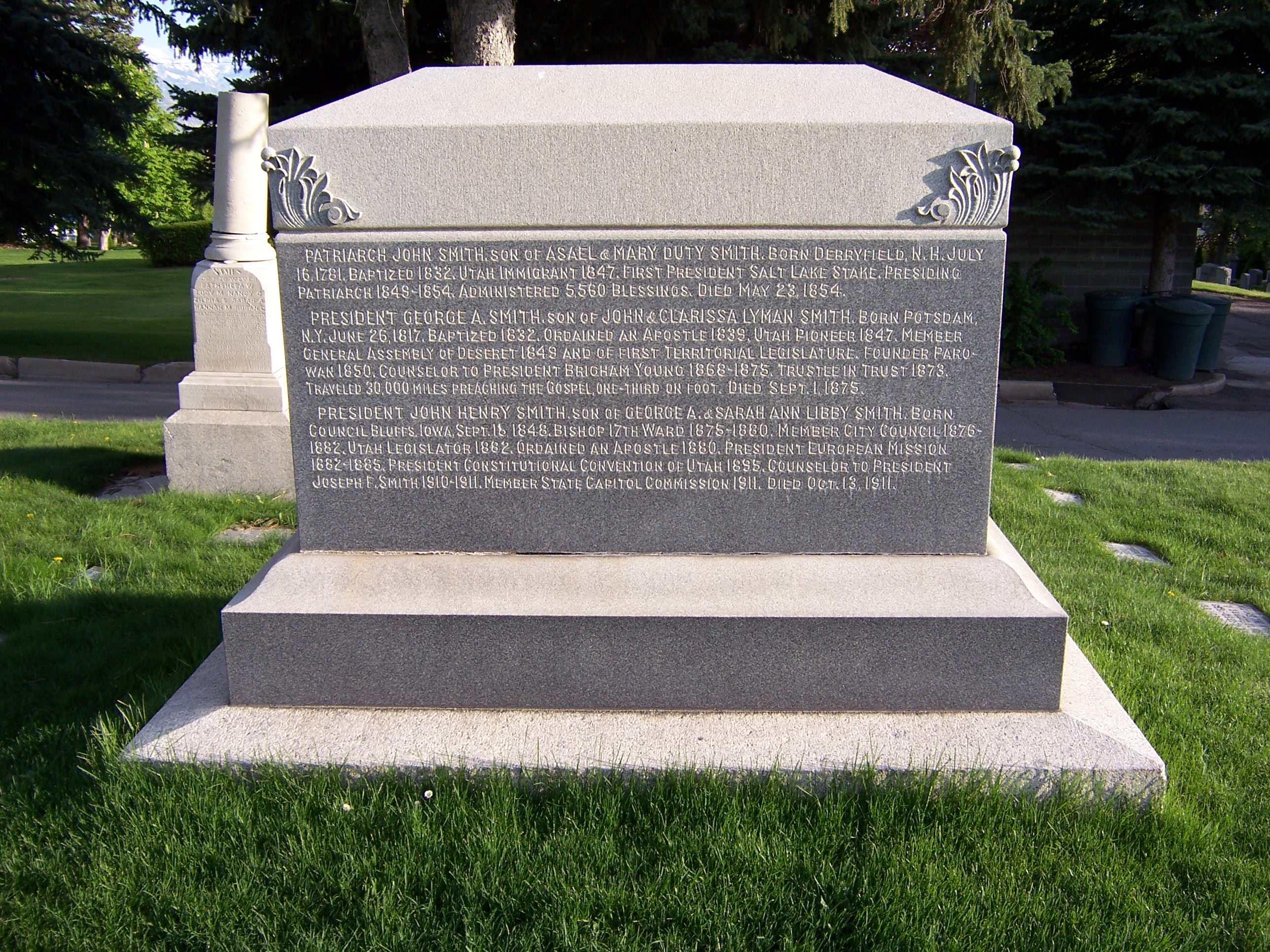
Back of monument.

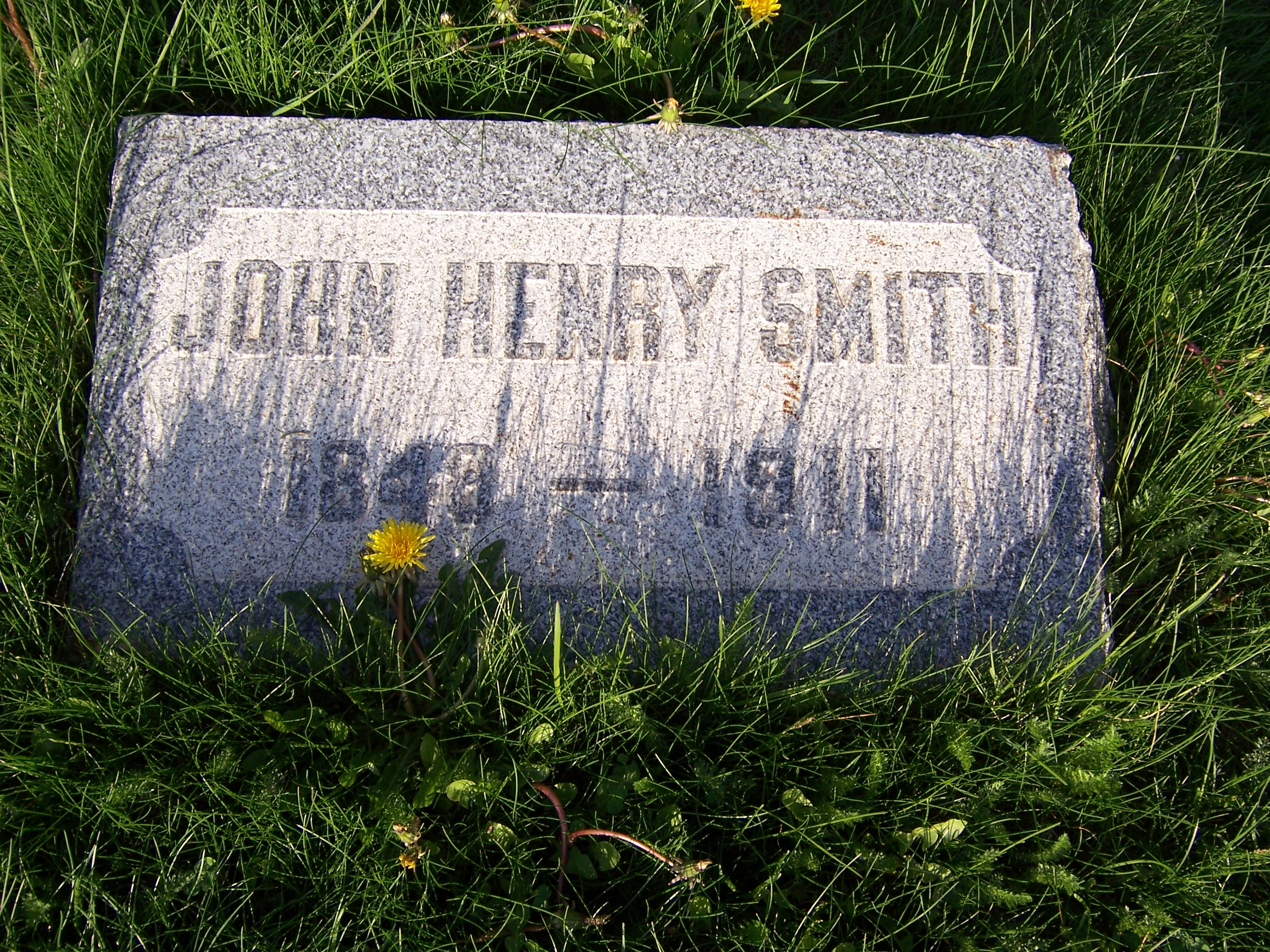
Headstone of John H. Smith.

== Notes ==
The Church of Jesus Christ of Latter-day Saints titles
Preceded by Anthon H. Lund	Second Counselor in the First Presidency; April 7, 1911 – October 13, 1911	Succeeded by Charles W. Penrose
Preceded by Francis M. Lyman	Quorum of the Twelve Apostles; October 27, 1880 – April 7, 1910	Succeeded by George Teasdale
