= John Smith (uncle of Joseph Smith) =

Leader of the Mormon Church (1781–1854)

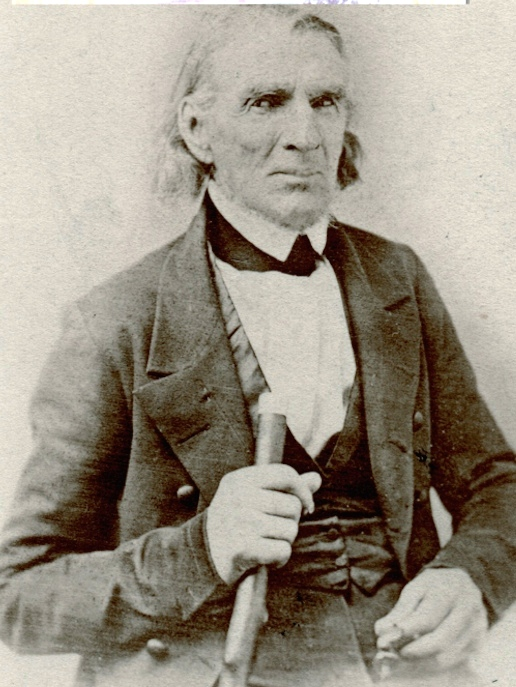

4th Presiding Patriarch
- January 1, 1849 – May 23, 1854

Assistant Counselor in the First Presidency
- September 3, 1837 – June 27, 1844
- End reason: First Presidency dissolved upon death of Joseph Smith

Personal details
- Born: July 16, 1781; Derryfield, New Hampshire, United States
- Died: May 23, 1854 (aged 72); Salt Lake City, Utah Territory, United States
- Resting place: Salt Lake City Cemetery; 40.77592°N 111.86247°W

John Smith (July 16, 1781 – May 23, 1854), known as Uncle John, was an early leader of the Church of Jesus Christ of Latter-day Saints (LDS Church).

Smith was the younger brother of Joseph Smith Sr., uncle of Joseph Smith and Hyrum Smith, father of George A. Smith, grandfather of John Henry Smith, and great-grandfather of George Albert Smith. He served as a member of the first presiding high council in Kirtland, Ohio, as an assistant counselor in the First Presidency under Joseph Smith, and as presiding patriarch under Brigham Young. He was succeeded as presiding patriarch by his great nephew, who was also named John Smith.

Smith served as president of the stake in Lee County, Iowa, during the Nauvoo period. He was also the first president of the Salt Lake Stake, the first stake in Utah Territory, and as such was the leader of the Latter-day Saints in Utah in the winter of 1847–48.

Smith practiced plural marriage and fathered four children.

Smith died at Salt Lake City and was buried at Salt Lake City Cemetery.

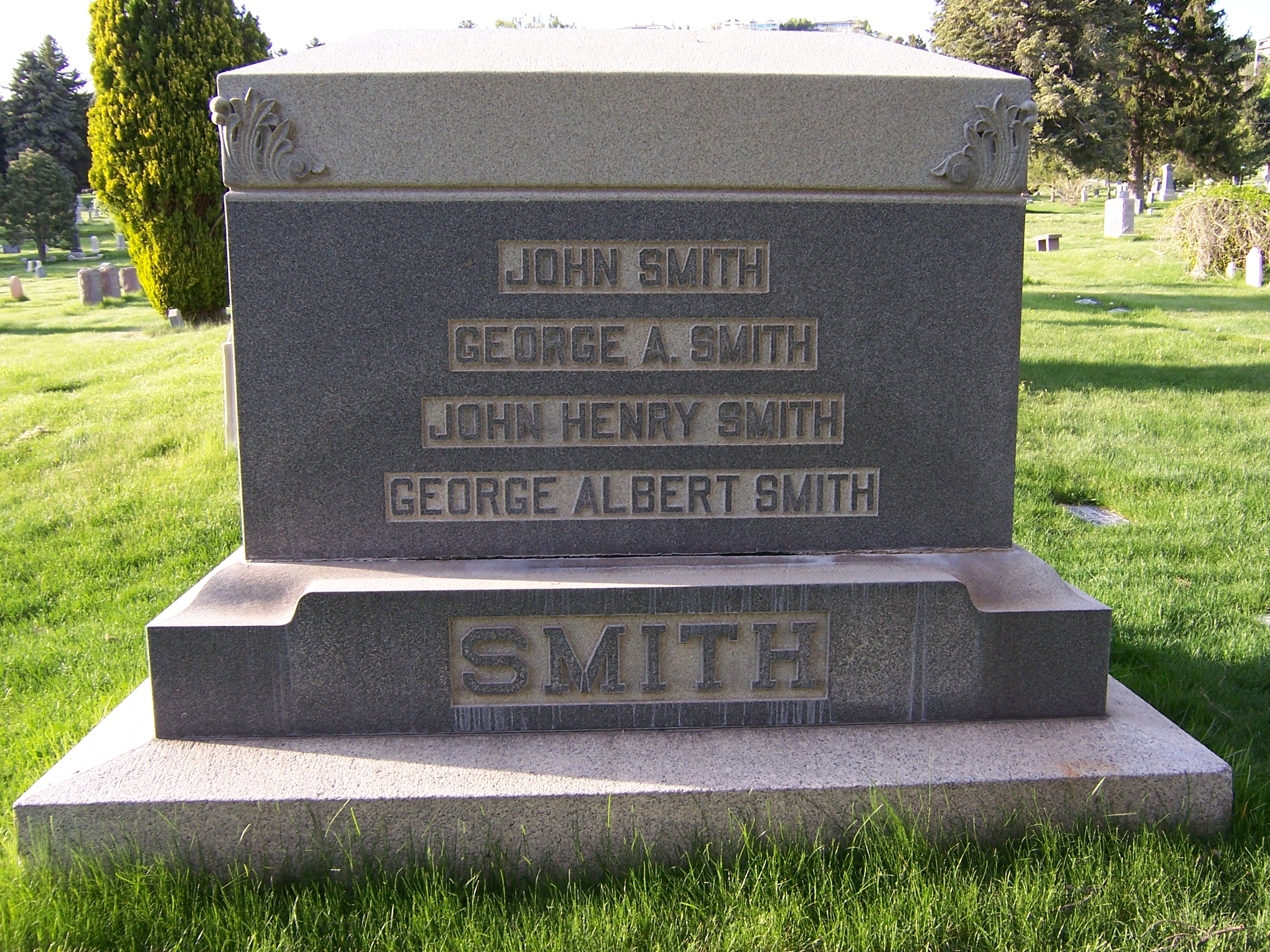
Monument to four generations of a branch of the Smith family, prominent in LDS history

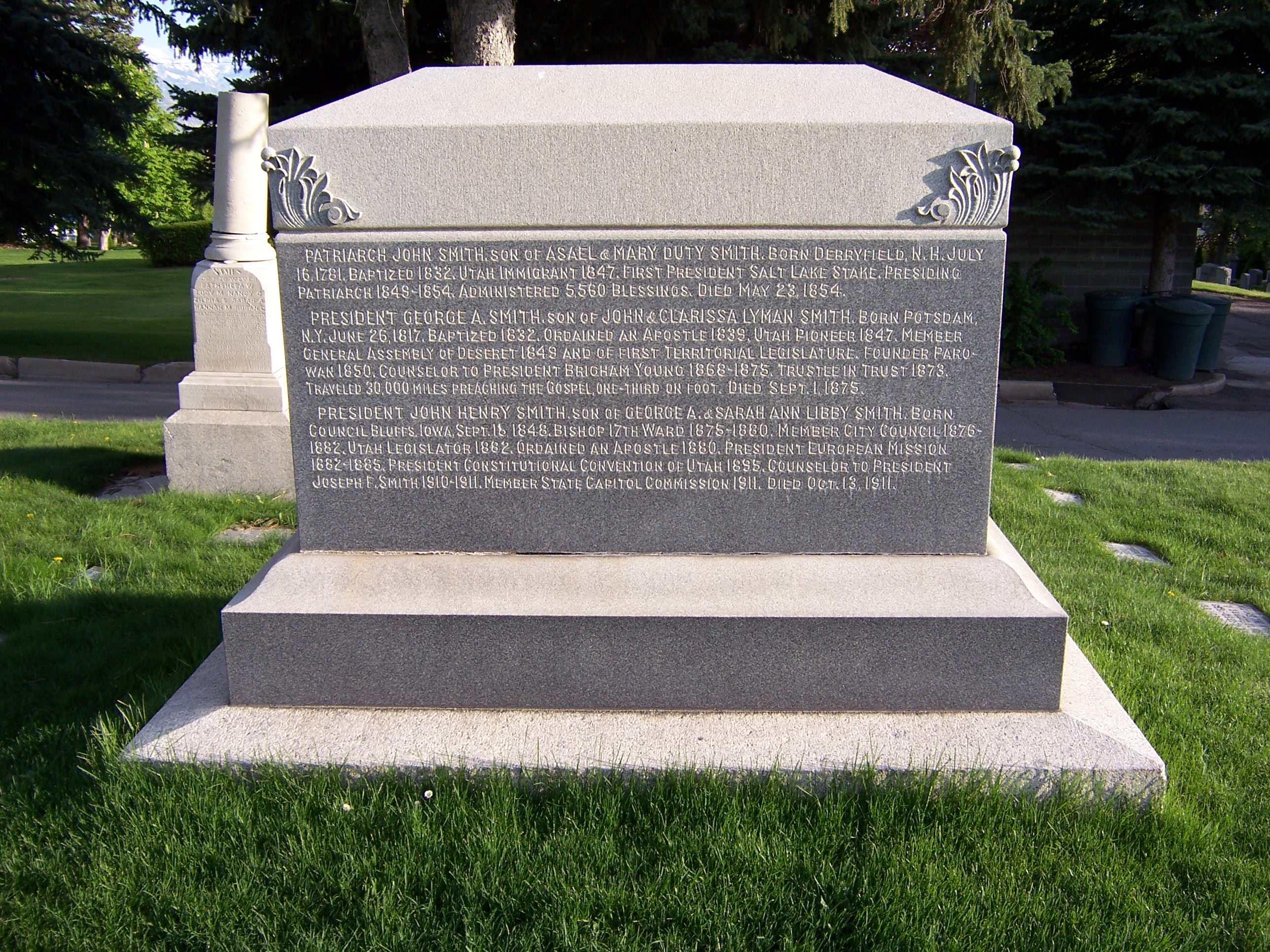
Back of monument

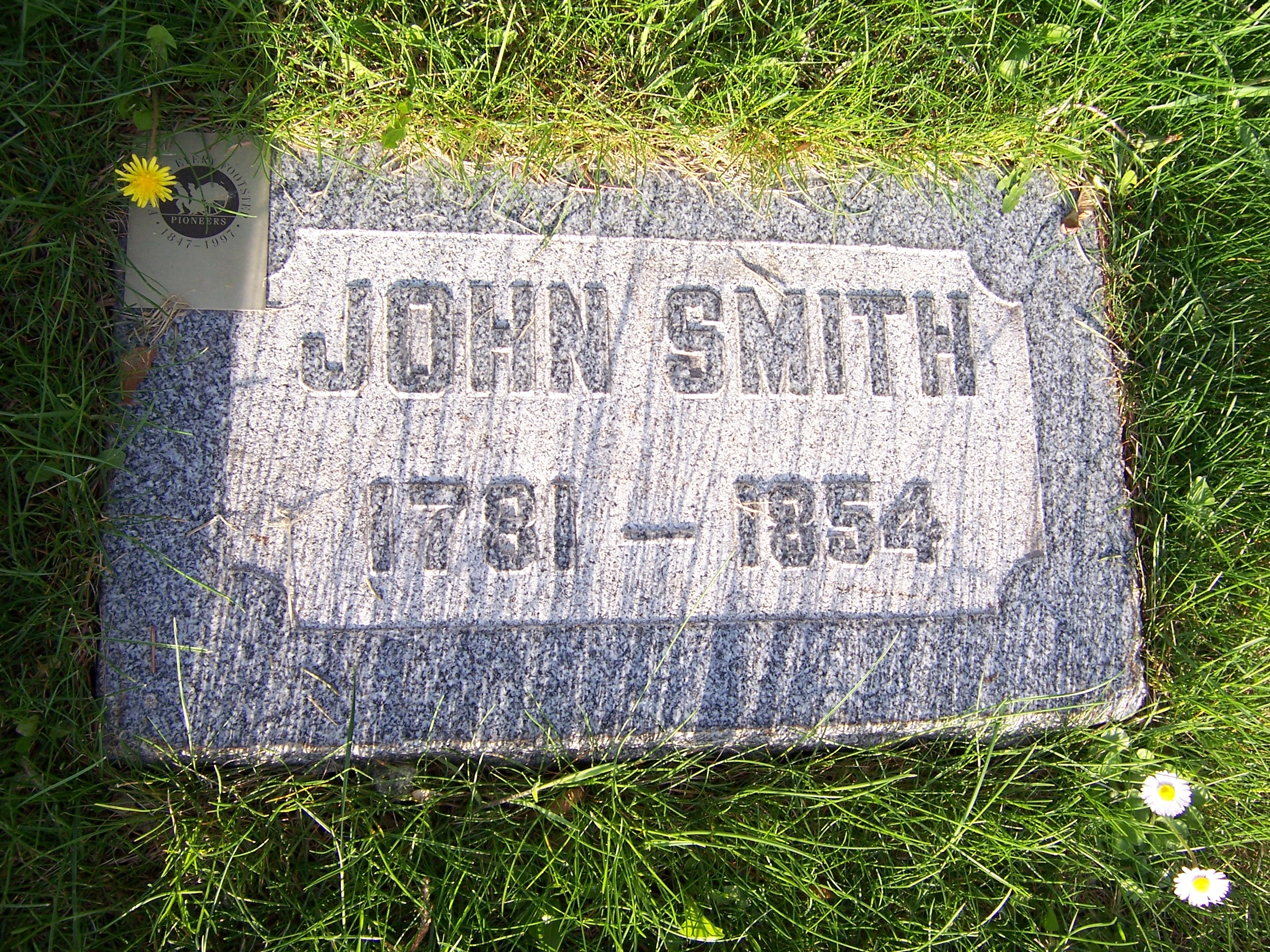
Headstone of John Smith

== Notes ==
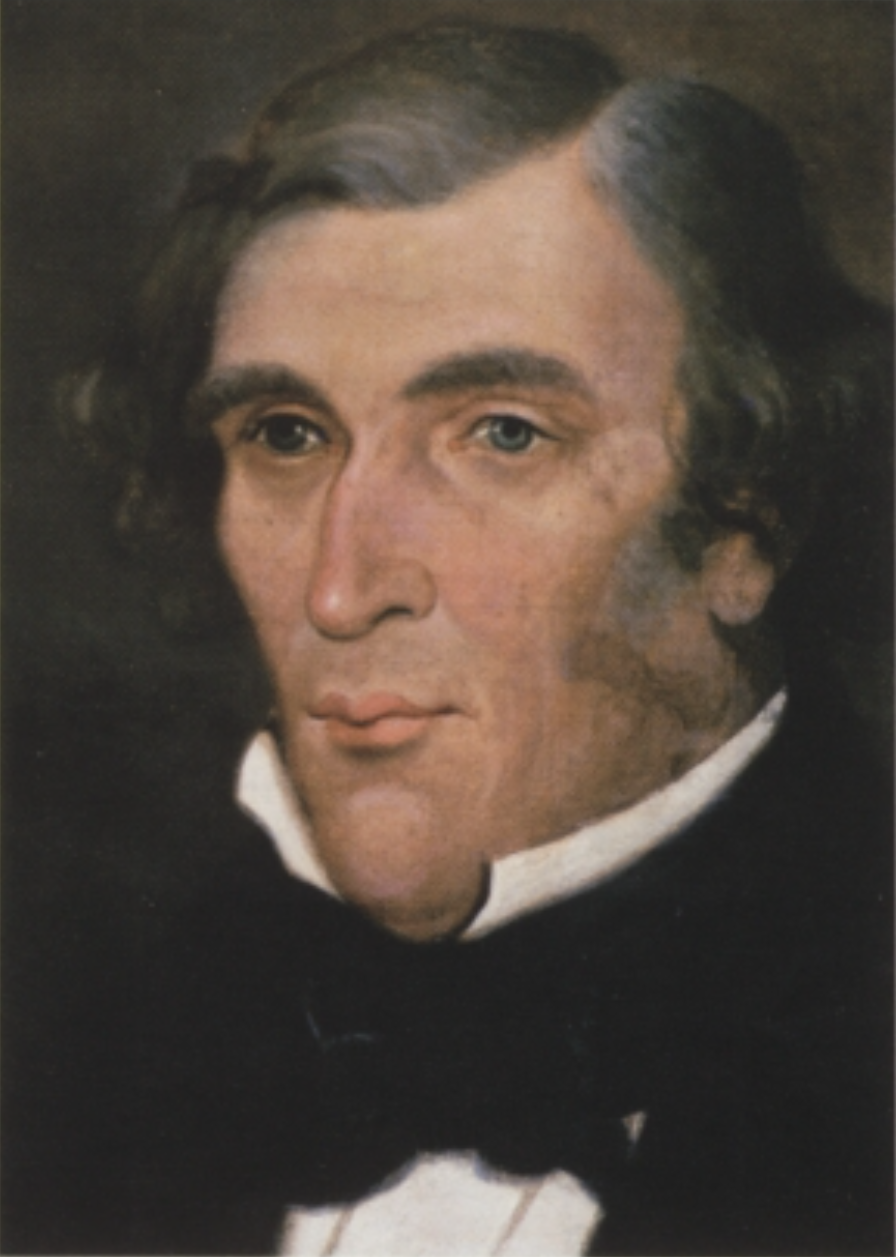
Portrait of John Smith that was displayed in the Celestial Room of the Nauvoo Temple

The Church of Jesus Christ of Latter-day Saints titles
Preceded by William Smith	Presiding Patriarch; January 1, 1849–May 23, 1854	Succeeded by John Smith
Church of the Latter Day Saints titles Later renamed: Church of Jesus Christ of Latter Day Saints (1838)
First	Assistant Counselor in the First Presidency; September 3, 1837–June 27, 1844; With: Oliver Cowdery; Hyrum Smith; Joseph Smith Sr. Amasa Lyman: (Counselor)	Vacant First Presidency reorganized Title next held by Joseph F. Smith as "Counselor"
