= Chronology of the Quorum of the Twelve Apostles =

This is a list of events in chronological order that affected the membership of the Quorum of the Twelve Apostles of the Church of Jesus Christ of Latter-day Saints, followed by a chart detailing the President and membership chronological and their timelines.

== 1830s ==
14 February 1835
Quorum of the Twelve Apostles is organized. Oliver Cowdery, Martin Harris, and David Whitmer choose the first 12 members. Lyman E. Johnson, Brigham Young, and Heber C. Kimball ordained.
15 February 1835
Orson Hyde, David W. Patten, Luke Johnson, William E. McLellin, John F. Boynton, and William Smith ordained.
21 February 1835
Parley P. Pratt ordained.
25 April 1835
Thomas B. Marsh ordained.
26 April 1835
Orson Pratt ordained.
2 May 1835
Thomas B. Marsh sustained as President of the Quorum of the Twelve
3 September 1837
John F. Boynton disfellowshipped. He was excommunicated later that year.
13 April 1838
Lyman E. Johnson and his brother, Luke Johnson excommunicated.
11 May 1838
William E. McLellin excommunicated.
25 October 1838
David W. Patten killed in Battle of Crooked River.
19 December 1838
John E. Page and John Taylor ordained.
17 March 1839
Thomas B. Marsh excommunicated.
26 April 1839
Wilford Woodruff and George A. Smith ordained.
4 May 1839
William Smith and Orson Hyde removed from the Quorum by vote of the church.
25 May 1839
William Smith restored to Quorum by vote of the Church.
27 June 1839
Orson Hyde restored to the Quorum by vote of the church.

== 1840s ==
14 April 1840
Willard Richards ordained in England. Also the first occasion where Brigham Young was formally sustained President of the Quorum of the Twelve Apostles
8 April 1841
Lyman Wight ordained.
20 August 1842
Orson Pratt excommunicated. Amasa M. Lyman ordained.
20 January 1843
Orson Pratt rebaptized and restored to former office in the Quorum. Amasa M. Lyman replaced.
4 February 1843
Amasa M. Lyman made a Counselor to First Presidency.
27 June 1844
Joseph Smith and Hyrum Smith killed. Amasa M. Lyman retires from First Presidency.
12 August 1844
Amasa M. Lyman returned to the Quorum.
6 October 1845
William Smith dropped from Quorum. He was excommunicated 19 October 1845.
9 February 1846
John E. Page disfellowshipped. He was excommunicated on 27 June 1846
16 July 1846
Ezra T. Benson ordained.
27 December 1847
The First Presidency is reorganized, with Brigham Young President, Heber C. Kimball First Counselor, and Willard Richards Second Counselor. Orson Hyde becomes President of the Quorum.
3 December 1848
Lyman Wight excommunicated.
12 February 1849
Charles C. Rich, Lorenzo Snow, Erastus Snow, and Franklin D. Richards ordained.

== 1850s ==
11 March 1854
Willard Richards dies.
7 April 1854
Jedediah M. Grant ordained an Apostle and set apart as a counselor to Brigham Young.
1 December 1856
Jedediah M. Grant dies.
4 January 1857
Daniel H. Wells ordained an apostle and set apart as a counsellor to Brigham Young.
13 May 1857
Parley P. Pratt is assassinated.

== 1860s ==
26 August 1860
George Q. Cannon ordained.
4 February 1864
Brigham Young, Jr. ordained an apostle, but not a member of the Quorum.
John Willard Young ordained an apostle, but not a member of the Quorum. (Set apart as counselor to Brigham Young in 1867, and to Twelve in 1877.)
Joseph Angell Young ordained an apostle, but not a member of the Quorum.
1 July 1866
Joseph F. Smith ordained and simultaneously set apart Counselor to President Brigham Young.
6 October 1867
Amasa M. Lyman deprived of apostleship. He was excommunicated on 12 May 1870.
8 October 1867
Joseph F. Smith was sustained as a member of the Quorum of the Twelve. (He was previously ordained an apostle.)
22 June 1868
Heber C. Kimball dies.
7 October 1868
George A. Smith set apart First Counselor to President Brigham Young.
9 October 1868
Brigham Young, Jr. sustained as a member of the Quorum of the Twelve. (He was previously ordained an apostle.)
8 April 1869
Brigham Young, Jr. moved ahead Joseph F. Smith in seniority. (He was previously the junior member of the quorum.)
3 September 1869
Ezra T. Benson dies.

== 1870s ==
3 July 1870
Albert Carrington ordained.
8 April 1873
Brigham Young, Jr., Albert Carrington, John Willard Young and George Q. Cannon set apart as Counselors to President Brigham Young.
9 May 1874
George Q. Cannon set apart Assistant Counselor to President Brigham Young. Albert Carrington set apart Counselor to President Brigham Young.
10 April 1875
Orson Hyde and Orson Pratt are moved down in seniority in the Quorum due to earlier apostasy, putting them in the places they would be had they entered the Quorum at the time of their reinstatements. John Taylor becomes President of the Quorum.
5 August 1875
Joseph Angell Young dies. He had never been a member of the First Presidency and was never added to the Quorum of the Twelve.
1 September 1875
George A. Smith dies.
8 October 1876
John Willard Young set apart as First Counselor to Brigham Young.
29 August 1877
Brigham Young dies.
28 November 1878
Orson Hyde dies.
7 April 1879
Moses Thatcher ordained.

== 1880s ==
10 October 1880
The First Presidency is reorganized with John Taylor President, George Q. Cannon First Counselor, and Joseph F. Smith Second Counselor. Wilford Woodruff becomes President of the Quorum.
27 October 1880
Francis M. Lyman and John Henry Smith ordained.
3 October 1881
Orson Pratt, the last surviving member of the original quorum, dies.
16 October 1882
George Teasdale and Heber J. Grant ordained.
17 November 1883
Charles C. Rich dies.
9 April 1884
John W. Taylor ordained.
7 November 1885
Albert Carrington excommunicated.
25 July 1887
John Taylor dies.
27 May 1888
Erastus Snow dies.
7 April 1889
The First Presidency is reorganized with Wilford Woodruff President, George Q. Cannon First Counselor, and Joseph F. Smith Second Counselor. Lorenzo Snow becomes President of the Quorum.
7 October 1889
Marriner W. Merrill, Anthon H. Lund, and Abraham H. Cannon ordained.

== 1890s ==
13 November 1893
William Smith dies.
6 April 1896
Moses Thatcher is not sustained by the church and dropped from the Quorum.
19 July 1896
Abraham H. Cannon dies.
7 October 1896
Matthias F. Cowley and Abraham O. Woodruff ordained.
2 September 1898
Wilford Woodruff dies.
13 September 1898
The First Presidency is reorganized with Lorenzo Snow President, George Q. Cannon First Counselor, and Joseph F. Smith Second Counselor. Franklin D. Richards becomes President of the Quorum.
10 October 1898
Rudger Clawson ordained.
9 December 1899
Franklin D. Richards dies. Brigham Young Jr. becomes de facto President of the Quorum, but not published or presented to the church.

== 1900s ==
31 March 1900
In a meeting of the First Presidency, George Q. Cannon is given the opportunity to choose between remaining in the First Presidency, or being released and becoming President of the Quorum of the Twelve. He chooses to stay in the First Presidency, leaving the question of seniority between Brigham Young Jr. and Joseph F. Smith unresolved until the following day.
1 April 1900
In a combined meeting of the First Presidency and Quorum of the Twelve Apostles, seniority is unanimously changed to be based on entry into the Quorum of the Twelve instead of date of ordination, ensuring George Q. Cannon and Joseph F. Smith's seniority to Brigham Young Jr.
8 April 1900
Reed Smoot ordained.
12 April 1901
George Q. Cannon dies.
10 October 1901
Lorenzo Snow dies. Joseph F. Smith becomes President of the Quorum.
17 October 1901
The First Presidency is reorganized with Joseph F. Smith as president, John R. Winder as First Counselor, and Anthon H. Lund Second Counselor. Brigham Young, Jr. becomes quorum president.
24 October 1901
Hyrum M. Smith ordained.
January 1903
Reed Smoot elected to the U.S. Senate.
11 April 1903
Brigham Young, Jr. dies. Francis M. Lyman becomes President of the Quorum.
8 October 1903
George Albert Smith ordained.
20 June 1904
Abraham O. Woodruff dies.
7 July 1904
Charles W. Penrose ordained.
28 October 1905
John W. Taylor and Matthias F. Cowley resign.
6 February 1906
Marriner W. Merrill dies.
9 April 1906
George F. Richards, Orson F. Whitney, and David O. McKay ordained.
20 February 1907
A motion to remove Reed Smoot from the U.S. Senate is defeated. (See Smoot Hearings)
9 June 1907
George Teasdale dies.
6 October 1907
Anthony W. Ivins ordained.
21 August 1909
Moses Thatcher dies.

== 1910s ==
27 March 1910
John R. Winder, First Counselor in the First Presidency, dies.
7 April 1910
Joseph F. Smith reorganizes First Presidency. Anthon H. Lund set apart as First Counselor, and John Henry Smith as Second Counselor. Joseph Fielding Smith ordained.
13 October 1911
John Henry Smith dies.
7 December 1911
Charles W. Penrose set apart as Second Counselor to President Joseph F. Smith.
8 December 1911
James E. Talmage ordained.
18 November 1916
Francis M. Lyman dies.
23 November 1916
Heber J. Grant becomes President of the Quorum.
18 January 1917
Stephen L Richards ordained.
23 January 1918
Hyrum M. Smith dies.
7 April 1918
Richard R. Lyman ordained.
19 November 1918
Joseph F. Smith dies.
23 November 1918
The First Presidency is reorganized, with Heber J. Grant President, Anthon H. Lund First Counselor, and Charles W. Penrose Second Counselor. Lund becomes President of the Quorum.
7 January 1919
Melvin J. Ballard ordained.

== 1920s ==
2 March 1921
Anthon H. Lund dies. Rudger Clawson becomes President of the Quorum.
10 March 1921
Charles W. Penrose set apart as First Counselor in the First Presidency, Anthony W. Ivins as Second Counselor to Heber J. Grant.
17 March 1921
John A. Widtsoe ordained.
16 May 1925
Charles W. Penrose dies.
28 May 1925
Anthony W. Ivins set apart as First Counselor to Heber J. Grant, with Charles W. Nibley as Second Counselor.

== 1930s ==
16 May 1931
Orson F. Whitney dies.
8 October 1931
Joseph F. Merrill ordained.
11 December 1931
Charles W. Nibley dies.
1932
Reed Smoot loses the election for the U.S. Senate.
6 April 1933
J. Reuben Clark called as Second Counselor in the First Presidency to Heber J. Grant, but is not an apostle.
27 July 1933
James E. Talmage dies.
12 October 1933
Charles A. Callis ordained.
23 September 1934
Anthony W. Ivins dies.
11 October 1934
J. Reuben Clark and Alonzo A. Hinckley ordained. Clark set apart as First Counselor, with David O. McKay as Second Counselor in the First Presidency to Heber J. Grant.
22 December 1936
Alonzo A. Hinckley dies.
8 April 1937
Albert E. Bowen ordained.
6 April 1938
Sylvester Q. Cannon ordained an apostle, and set apart as an Associate to the Twelve.
30 July 1939
Melvin J. Ballard dies.
6 October 1939
Sylvester Q. Cannon becomes a member of the Quorum.

== 1940s ==
9 February 1941
Reed Smoot dies.
10 April 1941
Harold B. Lee ordained.
29 May 1943
Sylvester Q. Cannon dies.
21 June 1943
Rudger Clawson dies. George Albert Smith becomes President of the Quorum.
7 October 1943
Spencer W. Kimball and Ezra Taft Benson ordained.
12 November 1943
Richard R. Lyman excommunicated.
20 April 1944
Mark E. Petersen ordained.
14 May 1945
Heber J. Grant dies.
21 May 1945
The First Presidency is reorganized, with George Albert Smith as president, J. Reuben Clark as First Counselor, and David O. McKay as Second Counselor. George F. Richards becomes President of the Quorum.
11 October 1945
Matthew Cowley ordained.
21 January 1947
Charles A. Callis dies.
10 April 1947
Henry D. Moyle ordained.

== 1950s ==
8 August 1950
George F. Richards dies. David O. McKay becomes President of the Quorum.
5 October 1950
Delbert L. Stapley ordained.
4 April 1951
George Albert Smith dies.
9 April 1951
The First Presidency is reorganized, with David O. McKay as president, Stephen L Richards as First Counselor, and J. Reuben Clark as Second Counselor. Joseph Fielding Smith becomes President of the Quorum.
11 October 1951
Marion G. Romney ordained.
3 February 1952
Joseph F. Merrill dies.
10 April 1952
LeGrand Richards ordained.
29 November 1952
John A. Widtsoe dies.
9 April 1953
Adam S. Bennion ordained.
15 July 1953
Albert E. Bowen dies.
8 October 1953
Richard L. Evans ordained.
13 December 1953
Matthew Cowley dies.
8 April 1954
George Q. Morris ordained.
11 February 1958
Adam S. Bennion dies.
10 April 1958
Hugh B. Brown ordained.
19 May 1959
Stephen L Richards dies.
12 June 1959
J. Reuben Clark is called as First Counselor to David O. McKay. Henry D. Moyle is called as Second Counselor.
15 October 1959
Howard W. Hunter ordained.

== 1960s ==
22 June 1961
Hugh B. Brown set apart as an additional counselor in the First Presidency to David O. McKay.
5 October 1961
Gordon B. Hinckley added to the Quorum.
6 October 1961
J. Reuben Clark dies.
12 October 1961
Henry D. Moyle set apart as First Counselor in the First Presidency, with Hugh B. Brown as Second Counselor to David O. McKay.
23 April 1962
George Q. Morris dies.
11 October 1962
N. Eldon Tanner ordained.
18 September 1963
Henry D. Moyle dies.
4 October 1963
Hugh B. Brown sustained as First Counselor in the First Presidency, with N. Eldon Tanner as Second Counselor to David O. McKay.
4 October 1963
Thomas S. Monson added to the Quorum.
28 October 1965
Thorpe B. Isaacson called as an additional counselor in the First Presidency to David O. McKay.
29 October 1965
Joseph Fielding Smith called as an additional counselor in the First Presidency to David O. McKay.
5 October 1967
Alvin R. Dyer ordained but not added to Quorum.
6 April 1968
Alvin R. Dyer called as an additional counselor in the First Presidency to David O. McKay.

== 1970s ==
18 January 1970
David O. McKay dies.
23 January 1970
The First Presidency is reorganized, with Joseph Fielding Smith as president, Harold B. Lee as First Counselor, and N. Eldon Tanner as Second Counselor. Lee becomes President of the Quorum, with Spencer W. Kimball as Acting President.
6 April 1970
Boyd K. Packer added to the Quorum.
1 November 1971
Richard L. Evans dies.
2 December 1971
Marvin J. Ashton ordained and added to the Quorum.
2 July 1972
Joseph Fielding Smith dies.
7 July 1972
The First Presidency is reorganized, with Harold B. Lee as president, N. Eldon Tanner as First Counselor, and Marion G. Romney as Second Counselor. Spencer W. Kimball becomes President of the Quorum.
12 October 1972
Bruce R. McConkie added to the Quorum.
26 December 1973
Harold B. Lee dies.
30 December 1973
The First Presidency is reorganized, with Spencer W. Kimball as president, N. Eldon Tanner as First Counselor, and Marion G. Romney as Second Counselor. Ezra Taft Benson becomes President of the Quorum.
6 April 1974
L. Tom Perry added to the Quorum.
2 December 1975
Hugh B. Brown dies.
8 January 1976
David B. Haight ordained.
5 March 1977
Alvin R. Dyer dies. Although Dyer was an ordained Apostle, he was never a member of the Quorum.
19 August 1978
Delbert L. Stapley dies.
30 September 1978
James E. Faust added to the Quorum.

== 1980s ==
23 July 1981
Gordon B. Hinckley called as an additional counselor in the First Presidency. Neal A. Maxwell ordained.
27 November 1982
N. Eldon Tanner dies.
2 December 1982
Marion G. Romney set apart as First Counselor in the First Presidency. Gordon B. Hinckley set apart as Second Counselor.
11 January 1983
LeGrand Richards dies.
11 January 1984
Mark E. Petersen dies.
12 April 1984
Russell M. Nelson ordained.
3 May 1984
Dallin H. Oaks ordained.
19 April 1985
Bruce R. McConkie dies.
10 October 1985
M. Russell Ballard ordained.
5 November 1985
Spencer W. Kimball dies.
10 November 1985
The First Presidency is reorganized, with Ezra Taft Benson as president, Gordon B. Hinckley as First Counselor, and Thomas S. Monson as Second Counselor. Marion G. Romney becomes President of the Quorum, but due to suffering from health and age difficulties, Howard W. Hunter was set apart as Acting President of the Quorum.
9 October 1986
Joseph B. Wirthlin ordained.
20 May 1988
Marion G. Romney dies. Howard W. Hunter becomes President of the Quorum.
6 October 1988
Richard G. Scott ordained.

== 1990s ==
25 February 1994
Marvin J. Ashton dies.
2 April 1994
Robert D. Hales added to the Quorum.
30 May 1994
Ezra Taft Benson dies.
5 June 1994
The First Presidency is reorganized, with Howard W. Hunter as president, Gordon B. Hinckley as First Counselor, and Thomas S. Monson as Second Counselor. Hinckley becomes President of the Quorum, with Boyd K. Packer as Acting President.
23 June 1994
Jeffrey R. Holland added to the Quorum and ordained.
3 March 1995
Howard W. Hunter dies.
12 March 1995
The First Presidency is reorganized, with Gordon B. Hinckley as president, Thomas S. Monson as First Counselor, and James E. Faust as Second Counselor. Monson becomes President of the Quorum, with Boyd K. Packer as Acting President.
1 April 1995
Henry B. Eyring added to the Quorum.

== 2000s ==
21 July 2004
Neal A. Maxwell dies.
31 July 2004
David B. Haight dies.
2 October 2004
Dieter F. Uchtdorf and David A. Bednar added to the Quorum.
10 August 2007
James E. Faust dies.
6 October 2007
Henry B. Eyring sustained as Second Counselor in the First Presidency; Quentin L. Cook added to the Quorum.
27 January 2008
Gordon B. Hinckley dies.
3 February 2008
The First Presidency is reorganized, with Thomas S. Monson as President, Henry B. Eyring as First Counselor, and Dieter F. Uchtdorf as Second Counselor. Boyd K. Packer becomes President of the Quorum.
5 April 2008
D. Todd Christofferson added to the Quorum.
1 December 2008
Joseph B. Wirthlin dies.
4 April 2009
Neil L. Andersen added to the Quorum.

== 2010s ==
30 May 2015
L. Tom Perry dies.
3 July 2015
Boyd K. Packer dies. Russell M. Nelson becomes President of the Quorum (set apart on 15 July).
22 September 2015
Richard G. Scott dies.
3 October 2015
Ronald A. Rasband, Gary E. Stevenson, and Dale G. Renlund added to the Quorum.
1 October 2017
Robert D. Hales dies.
2 January 2018
Thomas S. Monson dies.
14 January 2018
The First Presidency is reorganized, with Russell M. Nelson as President, Dallin H. Oaks as First Counselor, and Henry B. Eyring as Second Counselor. Oaks is set apart as President of the Quorum, with M. Russell Ballard as Acting President.
31 March 2018
Gerrit W. Gong and Ulisses Soares added to the Quorum.

== 2020s ==
12 November 2023
M. Russell Ballard dies. Jeffrey R. Holland becomes de facto Acting President of the Quorum.
15 November 2023
Jeffrey R. Holland formally set apart as Acting President of the Quorum.
7 December 2023
Patrick Kearon added to the Quorum.
27 September 2025
Russell M. Nelson dies.
14 October 2025
The First Presidency is reorganized, with Dallin H. Oaks as President, Henry B. Eyring as First Counselor, and D. Todd Christofferson as Second Counselor. Jeffrey R. Holland is set apart as President of the Quorum.
6 November 2025
Gérald Caussé ordained and added to the Quorum.
27 December 2025
Jeffrey R. Holland dies. Henry B. Eyring becomes President of the Quorum, with Dieter F. Uchtdorf as de facto Acting President.
8 January 2026
Dieter F. Uchtdorf formally set apart as Acting President of the Quorum.
12 February 2026
Clark G. Gilbert ordained and added to the Quorum.

== Chart ==
Dates	President of the Quorum and Acting President of the Quorum (if any). (Note: Note : "(de facto)" means a person was not formally set apart as Quorum President during this time, although he was widely accepted as President of the Quorum)	Members of the Quorum (In Order of Seniority)	Other Ordained Apostles not in Quorum	Change
14 February 1835 – 15 February 1835		Brigham Young, Heber C. Kimball, Lyman E. Johnson	Joseph Smith, Oliver Cowdery, David Whitmer, Martin Harris	Initial organization of Quorum (Brigham Young, Heber C. Kimball, Lyman E. Johnson). Members chosen by Oliver Cowdery, David Whitmer, and Martin Harris
15 February 1835 – 21 February 1835		David W. Patten, Brigham Young, Heber C. Kimball, Orson Hyde, William E. McLellin, Luke S. Johnson, William Smith, John F. Boynton, Lyman E. Johnson	Joseph Smith, Oliver Cowdery, David Whitmer, Martin Harris	Initial organization of Quorum (David W. Patten, Orson Hyde, William E. McLellin, Luke S. Johnson, William Smith, John F. Boynton). Members chosen by Oliver Cowdery, David Whitmer, and Martin Harris
21 February 1835 – 25 April 1835		David W. Patten, Brigham Young, Heber C. Kimball, Orson Hyde, William E. McLellin, Parley P. Pratt, Luke S. Johnson, William Smith, John F. Boynton, Lyman E. Johnson	Joseph Smith, Oliver Cowdery, David Whitmer, Martin Harris	Initial organization of Quorum (Parley P. Pratt). Members chosen by Oliver Cowdery, David Whitmer, and Martin Harris
25 April 1835 – 26 April 1835	Thomas B. Marsh	Thomas B. Marsh, David W. Patten, Brigham Young, Heber C. Kimball, Orson Hyde, William E. McLellin, Parley P. Pratt, Luke S. Johnson, William Smith, John F. Boynton, Lyman E. Johnson	Joseph Smith, Oliver Cowdery, David Whitmer, Martin Harris	Initial organization of Quorum (Thomas B. Marsh). Members chosen by Oliver Cowdery, David Whitmer, and Martin Harris
26 April 1835 – 3 September 1837	Thomas B. Marsh	Thomas B. Marsh, David W. Patten, Brigham Young, Heber C. Kimball, Orson Hyde, William E. McLellin, Parley P. Pratt, Luke S. Johnson, William Smith, Orson Pratt, John F. Boynton, Lyman E. Johnson	Joseph Smith, Oliver Cowdery, David Whitmer, Martin Harris	Initial organization of Quorum (Orson Pratt). Members chosen by Oliver Cowdery, David Whitmer, and Martin Harris
3 September 1837 – 3 December 1837	Thomas B. Marsh	Thomas B. Marsh, David W. Patten, Brigham Young, Heber C. Kimball, Orson Hyde, William E. McLellin, Parley P. Pratt, William Smith, Orson Pratt	Joseph Smith, Oliver Cowdery, David Whitmer, Martin Harris, Luke S. Johnson, John F. Boynton, Lyman E. Johnson	Luke S. Johnson, John F. Boynton, and Lyman E. Johnson disfellowshipped and removed from Quorum
3 December 1837 – 10 December 1837	Thomas B. Marsh	Thomas B. Marsh, David W. Patten, Brigham Young, Heber C. Kimball, Orson Hyde, William E. McLellin, Parley P. Pratt, William Smith, Orson Pratt	Joseph Smith, Oliver Cowdery, David Whitmer, Martin Harris, Luke S. Johnson, Lyman E. Johnson	John F. Boynton excommunicated for apostasy
10 December 1837 – 31 December 1837	Thomas B. Marsh	Thomas B. Marsh, David W. Patten, Brigham Young, Heber C. Kimball, Orson Hyde, William E. McLellin, Parley P. Pratt, William Smith, Orson Pratt	Joseph Smith, Oliver Cowdery, David Whitmer, Luke S. Johnson, Lyman E. Johnson	Martin Harris excommunicated for apostasy
31 December 1837 – 12 April 1838	Thomas B. Marsh	Thomas B. Marsh, David W. Patten, Brigham Young, Heber C. Kimball, Orson Hyde, William E. McLellin, Parley P. Pratt, William Smith, Orson Pratt	Joseph Smith, Oliver Cowdery, David Whitmer, Lyman E. Johnson	Luke S. Johnson denounces the Church and Joseph Smith
12 April 1838 – 13 April 1838	Thomas B. Marsh	Thomas B. Marsh, David W. Patten, Brigham Young, Heber C. Kimball, Orson Hyde, William E. McLellin, Parley P. Pratt, William Smith, Orson Pratt	Joseph Smith, David Whitmer, Lyman E. Johnson	Oliver Cowdery excommunicated for apostasy
13 April 1838 – 11 May 1838	Thomas B. Marsh	Thomas B. Marsh, David W. Patten, Brigham Young, Heber C. Kimball, Orson Hyde, William E. McLellin, Parley P. Pratt, William Smith, Orson Pratt	Joseph Smith	David Whitmer and Lyman E. Johnson excommunicated for apostasy
11 May 1838 – 25 October 1838	Thomas B. Marsh	Thomas B. Marsh, David W. Patten, Brigham Young, Heber C. Kimball, Orson Hyde, Parley P. Pratt, William Smith, Orson Pratt	Joseph Smith	William E. McLellin excommunicated for apostasy
25 October 1838 – 19 December 1838	Thomas B. Marsh	Thomas B. Marsh, Brigham Young, Heber C. Kimball, Orson Hyde, Parley P. Pratt, William Smith, Orson Pratt	Joseph Smith	David W. Patten killed
19 December 1838 – 17 March 1839	Thomas B. Marsh	Thomas B. Marsh, Brigham Young, Heber C. Kimball, Orson Hyde, Parley P. Pratt, William Smith, Orson Pratt, John E. Page, John Taylor	Joseph Smith	John E. Page and John Taylor ordained and added to Quorum
17 March 1839 – 26 April 1839	Brigham Young (de facto)	Brigham Young, Heber C. Kimball, Orson Hyde, Parley P. Pratt, William Smith, Orson Pratt, John E. Page, John Taylor	Joseph Smith	Thomas B. Marsh excommunicated for apostasy
26 April 1839 – 4 May 1839	Brigham Young (de facto)	Brigham Young, Heber C. Kimball, Orson Hyde, Parley P. Pratt, William Smith, Orson Pratt, John E. Page, John Taylor, Wilford Woodruff, George A. Smith	Joseph Smith	Wilford Woodruff and George A. Smith ordained and added to Quorum
4 May 1839 – 25 May 1839	Brigham Young (de facto)	Brigham Young, Heber C. Kimball, Parley P. Pratt, Orson Pratt, John E. Page, John Taylor, Wilford Woodruff, George A. Smith	Joseph Smith, William Smith, Orson Hyde	William Smith and Orson Hyde removed from Quorum by a vote of the Church
25 May 1839 – 27 June 1839	Brigham Young (de facto)	Brigham Young, Heber C. Kimball, Parley P. Pratt, William Smith, Orson Pratt, John E. Page, John Taylor, Wilford Woodruff, George A. Smith	Joseph Smith, Orson Hyde	William Smith readmitted to Quorum by a vote of the Church
27 June 1839 – 14 April 1840	Brigham Young (de facto)	Brigham Young, Heber C. Kimball, Orson Hyde, Parley P. Pratt, William Smith, Orson Pratt, John E. Page, John Taylor, Wilford Woodruff, George A. Smith	Joseph Smith	Orson Hyde readmitted to Quorum by a vote of the Church
14 April 1840 – 24 January 1841	Brigham Young	Brigham Young, Heber C. Kimball, Orson Hyde, Parley P. Pratt, William Smith, Orson Pratt, John E. Page, John Taylor, Wilford Woodruff, George A. Smith, Willard Richards	Joseph Smith	Willard Richards ordained and added to Quorum; Brigham Young officially sustained as president of the Quorum
24 January 1841 – 8 April 1841	Brigham Young	Brigham Young, Heber C. Kimball, Orson Hyde, Parley P. Pratt, William Smith, Orson Pratt, John E. Page, John Taylor, Wilford Woodruff, George A. Smith, Willard Richards	Joseph Smith, Hyrum Smith	Hyrum Smith ordained and made Assistant President of the Church
8 April 1841 – 20 August 1842	Brigham Young	Brigham Young, Heber C. Kimball, Orson Hyde, Parley P. Pratt, William Smith, Orson Pratt, John E. Page, John Taylor, Wilford Woodruff, George A. Smith, Willard Richards, Lyman Wight	Joseph Smith, Hyrum Smith	Lyman Wight ordained and added to Quorum
20 August 1842 – 20 January 1843	Brigham Young	Brigham Young, Heber C. Kimball, Orson Hyde, Parley P. Pratt, William Smith, John E. Page, John Taylor, Wilford Woodruff, George A. Smith, Willard Richards, Lyman Wight, Amasa M. Lyman	Joseph Smith, Hyrum Smith	Orson Pratt excommunicated for apostasy; Amasa M. Lyman ordained and added to Quorum
20 January 1843 – 27 June 1844	Brigham Young	Brigham Young, Heber C. Kimball, Orson Hyde, Parley P. Pratt, William Smith, Orson Pratt, John E. Page, John Taylor, Wilford Woodruff, George A. Smith, Willard Richards, Lyman Wight	Joseph Smith, Hyrum Smith, Amasa M. Lyman	Orson Pratt rebaptized and restored to the Quorum; Amasa M. Lyman dropped from Quorum due to an excess of apostles
27 June 1844 – 6 October 1845	Brigham Young	Brigham Young, Heber C. Kimball, Orson Hyde, Parley P. Pratt, William Smith, Orson Pratt, John E. Page, John Taylor, Wilford Woodruff, George A. Smith, Willard Richards, Lyman Wight	Amasa M. Lyman	Joseph Smith and Hyrum Smith killed
6 October 1845 – 19 October 1845	Brigham Young	Brigham Young, Heber C. Kimball, Orson Hyde, Parley P. Pratt, Orson Pratt, John E. Page, John Taylor, Wilford Woodruff, George A. Smith, Willard Richards, Lyman Wight, Amasa M. Lyman	William Smith	William Smith disfellowshipped and removed from Quorum; Amasa M. Lyman added to Quorum
19 October 1845 – 9 February 1846	Brigham Young	Brigham Young, Heber C. Kimball, Orson Hyde, Parley P. Pratt, Orson Pratt, John E. Page, John Taylor, Wilford Woodruff, George A. Smith, Willard Richards, Lyman Wight, Amasa M. Lyman		William Smith excommunicated for apostasy
9 February 1846 – 27 June 1846	Brigham Young	Brigham Young, Heber C. Kimball, Orson Hyde, Parley P. Pratt, John Taylor, Wilford Woodruff, George A. Smith, Willard Richards, Lyman Wight, Orson Pratt, Amasa M. Lyman	John E. Page	John E. Page disfellowshipped and removed from Quorum
27 June 1846 – 16 July 1846	Brigham Young	Brigham Young, Heber C. Kimball, Orson Hyde, Parley P. Pratt, John Taylor, Wilford Woodruff, George A. Smith, Willard Richards, Lyman Wight, Orson Pratt, Amasa M. Lyman		John E. Page excommunicated for apostasy
16 July 1846 – 27 December 1847	Brigham Young	Brigham Young, Heber C. Kimball, Orson Hyde, Parley P. Pratt, John Taylor, Wilford Woodruff, George A. Smith, Willard Richards, Lyman Wight, Orson Pratt, Amasa M. Lyman, Ezra T. Benson		Ezra T. Benson ordained and added to Quorum
27 December 1847 – 3 December 1848	Orson Hyde (Note: According to current practice, Heber C. Kimball would have been the President of the Quorum and Orson Hyde would have been designated Acting President, but this procedure was not followed. Heber C. Kimball was never set apart as the President of the Quorum.)	Orson Hyde, Parley P. Pratt, John Taylor, Wilford Woodruff, George A. Smith, Lyman Wight, Orson Pratt, Amasa M. Lyman, Ezra T. Benson	Brigham Young, Heber C. Kimball, Willard Richards	First Presidency reorganized (Brigham Young, Heber C. Kimball, and Willard Richards)
3 December 1848 – 12 February 1849	Orson Hyde	Orson Hyde, Parley P. Pratt, John Taylor, Wilford Woodruff, George A. Smith, Orson Pratt, Amasa M. Lyman, Ezra T. Benson	Brigham Young, Heber C. Kimball, Willard Richards	Lyman Wight excommunicated for apostasy
12 February 1849 – 11 March 1854	Orson Hyde	Orson Hyde, Parley P. Pratt, John Taylor, Wilford Woodruff, George A. Smith, Orson Pratt, Amasa M. Lyman, Ezra T. Benson, Charles C. Rich, Lorenzo Snow, Erastus Snow, Franklin D. Richards	Brigham Young, Heber C. Kimball, Willard Richards	Charles C. Rich, Lorenzo Snow, Erastus Snow, and Franklin D. Richards ordained and added to Quorum
11 March 1854 – 7 April 1854	Orson Hyde	Orson Hyde, Parley P. Pratt, John Taylor, Wilford Woodruff, George A. Smith, Orson Pratt, Amasa M. Lyman, Ezra T. Benson, Charles C. Rich, Lorenzo Snow, Erastus Snow, Franklin D. Richards	Brigham Young, Heber C. Kimball	Death of Willard Richards
7 April 1854 – 22 November 1855	Orson Hyde	Orson Hyde, Parley P. Pratt, John Taylor, Wilford Woodruff, George A. Smith, Orson Pratt, Amasa M. Lyman, Ezra T. Benson, Charles C. Rich, Lorenzo Snow, Erastus Snow, Franklin D. Richards	Brigham Young, Heber C. Kimball, Jedediah M. Grant	Jedediah M. Grant ordained and added to First Presidency
22 November 1855 – 1 December 1856	Orson Hyde	Orson Hyde, Parley P. Pratt, John Taylor, Wilford Woodruff, George A. Smith, Orson Pratt, Amasa M. Lyman, Ezra T. Benson, Charles C. Rich, Lorenzo Snow, Erastus Snow, Franklin D. Richards	Brigham Young, Heber C. Kimball, Jedediah M. Grant, John Willard Young	John Willard Young ordained
1 December 1856 – 4 January 1857	Orson Hyde	Orson Hyde, Parley P. Pratt, John Taylor, Wilford Woodruff, George A. Smith, Orson Pratt, Amasa M. Lyman, Ezra T. Benson, Charles C. Rich, Lorenzo Snow, Erastus Snow, Franklin D. Richards	Brigham Young, Heber C. Kimball, John Willard Young	Death of Jedediah M. Grant
4 January 1857 – 13 May 1857	Orson Hyde	Orson Hyde, Parley P. Pratt, John Taylor, Wilford Woodruff, George A. Smith, Orson Pratt, Amasa M. Lyman, Ezra T. Benson, Charles C. Rich, Lorenzo Snow, Erastus Snow, Franklin D. Richards	Brigham Young, Heber C. Kimball, Daniel H. Wells, John Willard Young	Daniel H. Wells ordained and added to First Presidency
13 May 1857 – 26 August 1860	Orson Hyde	Orson Hyde, John Taylor, Wilford Woodruff, George A. Smith, Orson Pratt, Amasa M. Lyman, Ezra T. Benson, Charles C. Rich, Lorenzo Snow, Erastus Snow, Franklin D. Richards	Brigham Young, Heber C. Kimball, Daniel H. Wells, John Willard Young	Parley P. Pratt killed
26 August 1860 – 4 February 1864	Orson Hyde	Orson Hyde, John Taylor, Wilford Woodruff, George A. Smith, Orson Pratt, Amasa M. Lyman, Ezra T. Benson, Charles C. Rich, Lorenzo Snow, Erastus Snow, Franklin D. Richards, George Q. Cannon	Brigham Young, Heber C. Kimball, Daniel H. Wells, John Willard Young	George Q. Cannon ordained and added to Quorum
4 February 1864 – 1 July 1866	Orson Hyde	Orson Hyde, John Taylor, Wilford Woodruff, George A. Smith, Orson Pratt, Amasa M. Lyman, Ezra T. Benson, Charles C. Rich, Lorenzo Snow, Erastus Snow, Franklin D. Richards, George Q. Cannon	Brigham Young, Heber C. Kimball, Daniel H. Wells, Brigham Young, Jr., John Willard Young, Joseph Angell Young	Brigham Young, Jr., and Joseph Angell Young ordained but not added to Quorum due to excess of Apostles
1 July 1866 – 6 October 1867	Orson Hyde	Orson Hyde, John Taylor, Wilford Woodruff, George A. Smith, Orson Pratt, Amasa M. Lyman, Ezra T. Benson, Charles C. Rich, Lorenzo Snow, Erastus Snow, Franklin D. Richards, George Q. Cannon	Brigham Young, Heber C. Kimball, Daniel H. Wells, Brigham Young, Jr., John Willard Young, Joseph Angell Young, Joseph F. Smith	Joseph F. Smith ordained and added to First Presidency
6 October 1867 – 8 October 1867	Orson Hyde	Orson Hyde, John Taylor, Wilford Woodruff, George A. Smith, Orson Pratt, Ezra T. Benson, Charles C. Rich, Lorenzo Snow, Erastus Snow, Franklin D. Richards, George Q. Cannon	Brigham Young, Heber C. Kimball, Daniel H. Wells, Brigham Young, Jr., John Willard Young, Joseph Angell Young, Joseph F. Smith	Amasa M. Lyman stripped of Apostleship for repeatedly teaching false doctrine
8 October 1867 – 22 June 1868	Orson Hyde	Orson Hyde, John Taylor, Wilford Woodruff, George A. Smith, Orson Pratt, Ezra T. Benson, Charles C. Rich, Lorenzo Snow, Erastus Snow, Franklin D. Richards, George Q. Cannon, Joseph F. Smith	Brigham Young, Heber C. Kimball, Daniel H. Wells, Brigham Young, Jr., John Willard Young, Joseph Angell Young	Joseph F. Smith added to Quorum, and retains his position in the First Presidency
22 June 1868 – 7 October 1868	Orson Hyde	Orson Hyde, John Taylor, Wilford Woodruff, George A. Smith, Orson Pratt, Ezra T. Benson, Charles C. Rich, Lorenzo Snow, Erastus Snow, Franklin D. Richards, George Q. Cannon, Joseph F. Smith	Brigham Young, Daniel H. Wells, Brigham Young, Jr., John Willard Young, Joseph Angell Young	Death of Heber C. Kimball
7 October 1868 – 9 October 1868	Orson Hyde	Orson Hyde, John Taylor, Wilford Woodruff, Orson Pratt, Ezra T. Benson, Charles C. Rich, Lorenzo Snow, Erastus Snow, Franklin D. Richards, George Q. Cannon, Joseph F. Smith	Brigham Young, George A. Smith, Daniel H. Wells, Brigham Young, Jr., John Willard Young, Joseph Angell Young	George A. Smith added to First Presidency
9 October 1868 – April 1869	Orson Hyde	Orson Hyde, John Taylor, Wilford Woodruff, Orson Pratt, Ezra T. Benson, Charles C. Rich, Lorenzo Snow, Erastus Snow, Franklin D. Richards, George Q. Cannon, Joseph F. Smith Brigham Young, Jr.	Brigham Young, George A. Smith, Daniel H. Wells, John Willard Young, Joseph Angell Young	Brigham Young, Jr. added to Quorum
April 1869 – 3 September 1869	Orson Hyde	Orson Hyde, John Taylor, Wilford Woodruff, Orson Pratt, Ezra T. Benson, Charles C. Rich, Lorenzo Snow, Erastus Snow, Franklin D. Richards, George Q. Cannon, Brigham Young, Jr. Joseph F. Smith	Brigham Young, George A. Smith, Daniel H. Wells, John Willard Young, Joseph Angell Young	Brigham Young, Jr. moved ahead of Joseph F. Smith in seniority
3 September 1869 – 3 July 1870	Orson Hyde	Orson Hyde, John Taylor, Wilford Woodruff, Orson Pratt, Charles C. Rich, Lorenzo Snow, Erastus Snow, Franklin D. Richards, George Q. Cannon, Joseph F. Smith, Brigham Young, Jr.	Brigham Young, George A. Smith, Daniel H. Wells, John Willard Young, Joseph Angell Young	Death of Ezra T. Benson
3 July 1870 – 8 April 1873	Orson Hyde	Orson Hyde, John Taylor, Wilford Woodruff, Orson Pratt, Charles C. Rich, Lorenzo Snow, Erastus Snow, Franklin D. Richards, George Q. Cannon, Joseph F. Smith, Brigham Young, Jr., Albert Carrington	Brigham Young, George A. Smith, Daniel H. Wells, John Willard Young, Joseph Angell Young	Albert Carrington ordained and added to Quorum
8 April 1873 – 10 April 1875	Orson Hyde	Orson Hyde, John Taylor, Wilford Woodruff, Orson Pratt, Charles C. Rich, Lorenzo Snow, Erastus Snow, Franklin D. Richards, Joseph F. Smith	Brigham Young, George A. Smith, Daniel H. Wells, John Willard Young, George Q. Cannon, Brigham Young, Jr., Joseph Angell Young, Albert Carrington	George Q. Cannon, Brigham Young, Jr., and Albert Carrington added to First Presidency
10 April 1875 – 5 August 1875	John Taylor (de facto)	John Taylor, Wilford Woodruff, Orson Pratt, Orson Hyde, Charles C. Rich, Lorenzo Snow, Erastus Snow, Franklin D. Richards, Joseph F. Smith	Brigham Young, George A. Smith, Daniel H. Wells, John Willard Young, George Q. Cannon, Brigham Young, Jr., Joseph Angell Young, Albert Carrington	Brigham Young rules that when an Apostle is removed from the Quorum and then readmitted at a later date, the Apostle loses his seniority in the Quorum and becomes the junior member of the Quorum upon readmission. Accordingly, the seniority positions of Orson Hyde and Orson Pratt are adjusted. Due to the readjustment, John Taylor becomes the senior Apostle in the Quorum.
5 August 1875 – 1 September 1875	John Taylor (de facto)	John Taylor, Wilford Woodruff, Orson Pratt, Orson Hyde, Charles C. Rich, Lorenzo Snow, Erastus Snow, Franklin D. Richards, Joseph F. Smith	Brigham Young, George A. Smith, Daniel H. Wells, John Willard Young, George Q. Cannon, Brigham Young, Jr., Albert Carrington	Death of Joseph Angell Young. He had never been a member of the Quorum or a member of the First Presidency.
1 September 1875 – 29 August 1877	John Taylor (de facto)	John Taylor, Wilford Woodruff, Orson Pratt, Orson Hyde, Charles C. Rich, Lorenzo Snow, Erastus Snow, Franklin D. Richards, Joseph F. Smith	Brigham Young, Daniel H. Wells, John Willard Young, George Q. Cannon, Brigham Young, Jr., Albert Carrington	Death of George A. Smith
29 August 1877 – 28 November 1878	John Taylor (de facto)	John Taylor, Wilford Woodruff, Orson Pratt, Orson Hyde, Charles C. Rich, Lorenzo Snow, Erastus Snow, Franklin D. Richards, George Q. Cannon, Joseph F. Smith, Brigham Young, Jr., Albert Carrington	Daniel H. Wells, John Willard Young	Death of Brigham Young; First Presidency dissolved; surviving members of First Presidency return to the Quorum; Daniel H. Wells and John Willard Young excluded from Quorum due to an excess of apostles
28 November 1878 – 7 April 1879	John Taylor (de facto)	John Taylor, Wilford Woodruff, Orson Pratt, Charles C. Rich, Lorenzo Snow, Erastus Snow, Franklin D. Richards, George Q. Cannon, Joseph F. Smith, Brigham Young, Jr., Albert Carrington	Daniel H. Wells, John Willard Young	Death of Orson Hyde
7 April 1879 – 10 October 1880	John Taylor (de facto)	John Taylor, Wilford Woodruff, Orson Pratt, Charles C. Rich, Lorenzo Snow, Erastus Snow, Franklin D. Richards, George Q. Cannon, Joseph F. Smith, Brigham Young, Jr., Albert Carrington, Moses Thatcher	Daniel H. Wells, John Willard Young	Moses Thatcher ordained and added to Quorum
10 October 1880 – 27 October 1880	Wilford Woodruff	Wilford Woodruff, Orson Pratt, Charles C. Rich, Lorenzo Snow, Erastus Snow, Franklin D. Richards, Brigham Young, Jr., Albert Carrington, Moses Thatcher	John Taylor, George Q. Cannon, Joseph F. Smith, Daniel H. Wells, John Willard Young	First Presidency reorganized (John Taylor, George Q. Cannon, Joseph F. Smith)
27 October 1880 – 3 October 1881	Wilford Woodruff	Wilford Woodruff, Orson Pratt, Charles C. Rich, Lorenzo Snow, Erastus Snow, Franklin D. Richards, Brigham Young, Jr., Albert Carrington, Moses Thatcher, Francis M. Lyman, John Henry Smith	John Taylor, George Q. Cannon, Joseph F. Smith, Daniel H. Wells, John Willard Young	Francis M. Lyman and John Henry Smith ordained and added to Quorum
3 October 1881 – 16 October 1882	Wilford Woodruff	Wilford Woodruff, Charles C. Rich, Lorenzo Snow, Erastus Snow, Franklin D. Richards, Brigham Young, Jr., Albert Carrington, Moses Thatcher, Francis M. Lyman, John Henry Smith	John Taylor, George Q. Cannon, Joseph F. Smith, Daniel H. Wells, John Willard Young	Death of Orson Pratt (last surviving member of the original Quorum)
16 October 1882 – 17 November 1883	Wilford Woodruff	Wilford Woodruff, Charles C. Rich, Lorenzo Snow, Erastus Snow, Franklin D. Richards, Brigham Young, Jr., Albert Carrington, Moses Thatcher, Francis M. Lyman, John Henry Smith, George Teasdale, Heber J. Grant	John Taylor, George Q. Cannon, Joseph F. Smith, Daniel H. Wells, John Willard Young	George Teasdale and Heber J. Grant ordained and added to Quorum
17 November 1883 – 9 April 1884	Wilford Woodruff	Wilford Woodruff, Lorenzo Snow, Erastus Snow, Franklin D. Richards, Brigham Young, Jr., Albert Carrington, Moses Thatcher, Francis M. Lyman, John Henry Smith, George Teasdale, Heber J. Grant	John Taylor, George Q. Cannon, Joseph F. Smith, Daniel H. Wells, John Willard Young	Death of Charles C. Rich
9 April 1884 – 7 November 1885	Wilford Woodruff	Wilford Woodruff, Lorenzo Snow, Erastus Snow, Franklin D. Richards, Brigham Young, Jr., Albert Carrington, Moses Thatcher, Francis M. Lyman, John Henry Smith, George Teasdale, Heber J. Grant, John W. Taylor	John Taylor, George Q. Cannon, Joseph F. Smith, Daniel H. Wells, John Willard Young	John W. Taylor ordained and added to Quorum
7 November 1885 – 25 July 1887	Wilford Woodruff	Wilford Woodruff, Lorenzo Snow, Erastus Snow, Franklin D. Richards, Brigham Young, Jr., Moses Thatcher, Francis M. Lyman, John Henry Smith, George Teasdale, Heber J. Grant, John W. Taylor	John Taylor, George Q. Cannon, Joseph F. Smith, Daniel H. Wells, John Willard Young	Albert Carrington excommunicated for adultery and fornication
25 July 1887 – 27 May 1888	Wilford Woodruff	Wilford Woodruff, Lorenzo Snow, Erastus Snow, Franklin D. Richards, George Q. Cannon, Joseph F. Smith, Brigham Young, Jr., Moses Thatcher, Francis M. Lyman, John Henry Smith, George Teasdale, Heber J. Grant, John W. Taylor	Daniel H. Wells, John Willard Young	Death of John Taylor; First Presidency dissolved; surviving members of First Presidency return to the Quorum
27 May 1888 – 7 April 1889	Wilford Woodruff	Wilford Woodruff, Lorenzo Snow, Franklin D. Richards, George Q. Cannon, Joseph F. Smith, Brigham Young, Jr., Moses Thatcher, Francis M. Lyman, John Henry Smith, George Teasdale, Heber J. Grant, John W. Taylor	Daniel H. Wells, John Willard Young	Death of Erastus Snow
7 April 1889 – 7 October 1889	Lorenzo Snow	Lorenzo Snow, Franklin D. Richards, Brigham Young, Jr., Moses Thatcher, Francis M. Lyman, John Henry Smith, George Teasdale, Heber J. Grant, John W. Taylor	Wilford Woodruff, George Q. Cannon, Joseph F. Smith, Daniel H. Wells, John Willard Young	Reorganization of First Presidency (Wilford Woodruff, George Q. Cannon, Joseph F. Smith, Daniel H. Wells, and John Willard Young)
7 October 1889 – 24 March 1891	Lorenzo Snow	Lorenzo Snow, Franklin D. Richards, Brigham Young, Jr., Moses Thatcher, Francis M. Lyman, John Henry Smith, George Teasdale, Heber J. Grant, John W. Taylor, Marriner W. Merrill, Anthon H. Lund, Abraham H. Cannon	Wilford Woodruff, George Q. Cannon, Joseph F. Smith, Daniel H. Wells, John Willard Young	Marriner W. Merrill, Anthon H. Lund, and Abraham H. Cannon ordained and added to Quorum
24 March 1891 – 6 April 1896	Lorenzo Snow	Lorenzo Snow, Franklin D. Richards, Brigham Young, Jr., Moses Thatcher, Francis M. Lyman, John Henry Smith, George Teasdale, Heber J. Grant, John W. Taylor, Marriner W. Merrill, Anthon H. Lund, Abraham H. Cannon	Wilford Woodruff, George Q. Cannon, Joseph F. Smith, John Willard Young	Death of Daniel H. Wells (no change to Quorum or First Presidency)
6 April 1896 – 19 July 1896	Lorenzo Snow	Lorenzo Snow, Franklin D. Richards, Brigham Young, Jr., Francis M. Lyman, John Henry Smith, George Teasdale, Heber J. Grant, John W. Taylor, Marriner W. Merrill, Anthon H. Lund, Abraham H. Cannon	Wilford Woodruff, George Q. Cannon, Joseph F. Smith, John Willard Young, Moses Thatcher	Moses Thatcher not sustained by the Church and removed from Quorum
19 July 1896 – 7 October 1896	Lorenzo Snow	Lorenzo Snow, Franklin D. Richards, Brigham Young, Jr., Francis M. Lyman, John Henry Smith, George Teasdale, Heber J. Grant, John W. Taylor, Marriner W. Merrill, Anthon H. Lund	Wilford Woodruff, George Q. Cannon, Joseph F. Smith, John Willard Young, Moses Thatcher	Death of Abraham H. Cannon
7 October 1896 – 2 September 1898	Lorenzo Snow	Lorenzo Snow, Franklin D. Richards, Brigham Young, Jr., Francis M. Lyman, John Henry Smith, George Teasdale, Heber J. Grant, John W. Taylor, Marriner W. Merrill, Anthon H. Lund, Matthias F. Cowley, Abraham O. Woodruff	Wilford Woodruff, George Q. Cannon, Joseph F. Smith, John Willard Young, Moses Thatcher	Matthias F. Cowley and Abraham O. Woodruff ordained and added to Quorum
2 September 1898 – 13 September 1898	Lorenzo Snow	Lorenzo Snow, Franklin D. Richards, George Q. Cannon, Joseph F. Smith, Brigham Young, Jr., Francis M. Lyman, John Henry Smith, George Teasdale, Heber J. Grant, John W. Taylor, Marriner W. Merrill, Anthon H. Lund, Matthias F. Cowley, Abraham O. Woodruff	John Willard Young, Moses Thatcher	Death of Wilford Woodruff; First Presidency dissolved; surviving members of First Presidency return to the Quorum.
13 September 1898 – 10 October 1898	Franklin D. Richards	Franklin D. Richards, Brigham Young, Jr., Francis M. Lyman, John Henry Smith, George Teasdale, Heber J. Grant, John W. Taylor, Marriner W. Merrill, Anthon H. Lund, Matthias F. Cowley, Abraham O. Woodruff	Lorenzo Snow, George Q. Cannon, Joseph F. Smith, John Willard Young, Moses Thatcher,	Reorganization of First Presidency (Lorenzo Snow, George Q. Cannon, Joseph F. Smith)
10 October 1898 – 9 December 1899	Franklin D. Richards	Franklin D. Richards, Brigham Young, Jr., Francis M. Lyman, John Henry Smith, George Teasdale, Heber J. Grant, John W. Taylor, Marriner W. Merrill, Anthon H. Lund, Matthias F. Cowley, Abraham O. Woodruff, Rudger Clawson	Lorenzo Snow, George Q. Cannon, Joseph F. Smith, John Willard Young, Moses Thatcher,	Rudger Clawson ordained and added to Quorum
9 December 1899 – 8 April 1900	Brigham Young, Jr. (Note: According to current practice, George Q. Cannon would have been the President of the Quorum and Brigham Young, Jr. would have been designated Acting President, but this procedure was not followed. George Q. Cannon was never set apart as the President of the Quorum.)	Brigham Young, Jr., Francis M. Lyman, John Henry Smith, George Teasdale, Heber J. Grant, John W. Taylor, Marriner W. Merrill, Anthon H. Lund, Matthias F. Cowley, Abraham O. Woodruff, Rudger Clawson	Lorenzo Snow, George Q. Cannon, Joseph F. Smith, John Willard Young, Moses Thatcher,	Death of Franklin D. Richards
8 April 1900 – 12 April 1901	Brigham Young, Jr.	Brigham Young, Jr., Francis M. Lyman, John Henry Smith, George Teasdale, Heber J. Grant, John W. Taylor, Marriner W. Merrill, Anthon H. Lund, Matthias F. Cowley, Abraham O. Woodruff, Rudger Clawson, Reed Smoot	Lorenzo Snow, George Q. Cannon, Joseph F. Smith, John Willard Young, Moses Thatcher,	Reed Smoot ordained and added to Quorum
12 April 1901 – 6 October 1901	Brigham Young, Jr. (Note: According to current practice, Joseph F. Smith would have been the President of the Quorum and Brigham Young, Jr. would have been designated Acting President, but this procedure was not followed. Joseph F. Smith was not set apart as the President of the Quorum at this time.)	Brigham Young, Jr., Francis M. Lyman, John Henry Smith, George Teasdale, Heber J. Grant, John W. Taylor, Marriner W. Merrill, Anthon H. Lund, Matthias F. Cowley, Abraham O. Woodruff, Rudger Clawson, Reed Smoot	Lorenzo Snow, Joseph F. Smith, John Willard Young, Moses Thatcher,	Death of George Q. Cannon
6 October 1901 – 10 October 1901	Brigham Young, Jr.	Brigham Young, Jr., Francis M. Lyman, John Henry Smith, George Teasdale, Heber J. Grant, John W. Taylor, Marriner W. Merrill, Anthon H. Lund, Matthias F. Cowley, Abraham O. Woodruff, Reed Smoot	Lorenzo Snow, Joseph F. Smith, Rudger Clawson, John Willard Young, Moses Thatcher,	Rudger Clawson added to First Presidency
10 October 1901 – 17 October 1901	Joseph F. Smith (de facto)	Joseph F. Smith, Brigham Young, Jr., Francis M. Lyman, John Henry Smith, George Teasdale, Heber J. Grant, John W. Taylor, Marriner W. Merrill, Anthon H. Lund, Matthias F. Cowley, Abraham O. Woodruff, Rudger Clawson, Reed Smoot	John Willard Young, Moses Thatcher	Death of Lorenzo Snow; First Presidency dissolved; surviving members of First Presidency return to the Quorum.
17 October 1901 – 24 October 1901	Brigham Young, Jr.	Brigham Young, Jr., Francis M. Lyman, John Henry Smith, George Teasdale, Heber J. Grant, John W. Taylor, Marriner W. Merrill, Matthias F. Cowley, Abraham O. Woodruff, Rudger Clawson, Reed Smoot	Joseph F. Smith, Anthon H. Lund, John Willard Young, Moses Thatcher	Reorganization of First Presidency (Joseph F. Smith, John R. Winder, Anthon H. Lund)
24 October 1901 – 11 April 1903	Brigham Young, Jr.	Brigham Young, Jr., Francis M. Lyman, John Henry Smith, George Teasdale, Heber J. Grant, John W. Taylor, Marriner W. Merrill, Matthias F. Cowley, Abraham O. Woodruff, Rudger Clawson, Reed Smoot, Hyrum M. Smith	Joseph F. Smith, Anthon H. Lund, John Willard Young, Moses Thatcher	Hyrum M. Smith ordained and added to Quorum
11 April 1903 – 8 October 1903	Francis M. Lyman	Francis M. Lyman, John Henry Smith, George Teasdale, Heber J. Grant, John W. Taylor, Marriner W. Merrill, Matthias F. Cowley, Abraham O. Woodruff, Rudger Clawson, Reed Smoot, Hyrum M. Smith	Joseph F. Smith, Anthon H. Lund, John Willard Young, Moses Thatcher	Death of Brigham Young, Jr.
8 October 1903 – 20 June 1904	Francis M. Lyman	Francis M. Lyman, John Henry Smith, George Teasdale, Heber J. Grant, John W. Taylor, Marriner W. Merrill, Matthias F. Cowley, Abraham O. Woodruff, Rudger Clawson, Reed Smoot, Hyrum M. Smith, George Albert Smith	Joseph F. Smith, Anthon H. Lund, John Willard Young, Moses Thatcher	George Albert Smith ordained and added to Quorum
20 June 1904 – 7 July 1904	Francis M. Lyman	Francis M. Lyman, John Henry Smith, George Teasdale, Heber J. Grant, John W. Taylor, Marriner W. Merrill, Matthias F. Cowley, Rudger Clawson, Reed Smoot, Hyrum M. Smith, George Albert Smith	Joseph F. Smith, Anthon H. Lund, John Willard Young, Moses Thatcher	Death of Abraham O. Woodruff
7 July 1904 – 28 October 1905	Francis M. Lyman	Francis M. Lyman, John Henry Smith, George Teasdale, Heber J. Grant, John W. Taylor, Marriner W. Merrill, Matthias F. Cowley, Rudger Clawson, Reed Smoot, Hyrum M. Smith, George Albert Smith, Charles W. Penrose	Joseph F. Smith, Anthon H. Lund, John Willard Young, Moses Thatcher	Charles W. Penrose ordained and added to Quorum
28 October 1905 – 6 February 1906	Francis M. Lyman	Francis M. Lyman, John Henry Smith, George Teasdale, Heber J. Grant, Marriner W. Merrill, Rudger Clawson, Reed Smoot, Hyrum M. Smith, George Albert Smith, Charles W. Penrose	Joseph F. Smith, Anthon H. Lund, John Willard Young, Moses Thatcher, John W. Taylor, Matthias F. Cowley	John W. Taylor and Matthias F. Cowley resign from the Quorum over plural marriage disputes
6 February 1906 – 9 April 1906	Francis M. Lyman	Francis M. Lyman, John Henry Smith, George Teasdale, Heber J. Grant, Rudger Clawson, Reed Smoot, Hyrum M. Smith, George Albert Smith, Charles W. Penrose	Joseph F. Smith, Anthon H. Lund, John Willard Young, Moses Thatcher, John W. Taylor, Matthias F. Cowley	Death of Marriner W. Merrill
9 April 1906 – 9 June 1907	Francis M. Lyman	Francis M. Lyman, John Henry Smith, George Teasdale, Heber J. Grant, Rudger Clawson, Reed Smoot, Hyrum M. Smith, George Albert Smith, Charles W. Penrose, George F. Richards, Orson F. Whitney, David O. McKay	Joseph F. Smith, Anthon H. Lund, John Willard Young, Moses Thatcher, John W. Taylor, Matthias F. Cowley	George F. Richards, Orson F. Whitney, and David O. McKay ordained and added to Quorum
9 June 1907 – 6 October 1907	Francis M. Lyman	Francis M. Lyman, John Henry Smith, Heber J. Grant, Rudger Clawson, Reed Smoot, Hyrum M. Smith, George Albert Smith, Charles W. Penrose, George F. Richards, Orson F. Whitney, David O. McKay	Joseph F. Smith, Anthon H. Lund, John Willard Young, Moses Thatcher, John W. Taylor, Matthias F. Cowley	Death of George Teasdale
6 October 1907 – 21 August 1909	Francis M. Lyman	Francis M. Lyman, John Henry Smith, Heber J. Grant, Rudger Clawson, Reed Smoot, Hyrum M. Smith, George Albert Smith, Charles W. Penrose, George F. Richards, Orson F. Whitney, David O. McKay, Anthony W. Ivins	Joseph F. Smith, Anthon H. Lund, John Willard Young, Moses Thatcher, John W. Taylor, Matthias F. Cowley	Anthony W. Ivins ordained and added to Quorum
21 August 1909 – 7 April 1910	Francis M. Lyman	Francis M. Lyman, John Henry Smith, Heber J. Grant, Rudger Clawson, Reed Smoot, Hyrum M. Smith, George Albert Smith, Charles W. Penrose, George F. Richards, Orson F. Whitney, David O. McKay, Anthony W. Ivins	Joseph F. Smith, Anthon H. Lund, John Willard Young, John W. Taylor, Matthias F. Cowley	Death of Moses Thatcher
7 April 1910 – 11 May 1911	Francis M. Lyman	Francis M. Lyman, Heber J. Grant, Rudger Clawson, Reed Smoot, Hyrum M. Smith, George Albert Smith, Charles W. Penrose, George F. Richards, Orson F. Whitney, David O. McKay, Anthony W. Ivins, Joseph Fielding Smith	Joseph F. Smith, Anthon H. Lund, John Henry Smith, John Willard Young, John W. Taylor, Matthias F. Cowley	John Henry Smith added to First Presidency; Joseph Fielding Smith ordained and added to Quorum
11 May 1911 – 13 October 1911	Francis M. Lyman	Francis M. Lyman, Heber J. Grant, Rudger Clawson, Reed Smoot, Hyrum M. Smith, George Albert Smith, Charles W. Penrose, George F. Richards, Orson F. Whitney, David O. McKay, Anthony W. Ivins, Joseph Fielding Smith	Joseph F. Smith, Anthon H. Lund, John Henry Smith, John Willard Young	John W. Taylor excommunicated; Matthias F. Cowley's priesthood suspended
13 October 1911 – 7 December 1911	Francis M. Lyman	Francis M. Lyman, Heber J. Grant, Rudger Clawson, Reed Smoot, Hyrum M. Smith, George Albert Smith, Charles W. Penrose, George F. Richards, Orson F. Whitney, David O. McKay, Anthony W. Ivins, Joseph Fielding Smith	Joseph F. Smith, Anthon H. Lund, John Willard Young	Death of John Henry Smith
7 December 1911 – 8 December 1911	Francis M. Lyman	Francis M. Lyman, Heber J. Grant, Rudger Clawson, Reed Smoot, Hyrum M. Smith, George Albert Smith, George F. Richards, Orson F. Whitney, David O. McKay, Anthony W. Ivins, Joseph Fielding Smith	Joseph F. Smith, Anthon H. Lund, Charles W. Penrose, John Willard Young	Charles W. Penrose added to First Presidency
8 December 1911 – 18 November 1916	Francis M. Lyman	Francis M. Lyman, Heber J. Grant, Rudger Clawson, Reed Smoot, Hyrum M. Smith, George Albert Smith, George F. Richards, Orson F. Whitney, David O. McKay, Anthony W. Ivins, Joseph Fielding Smith, James E. Talmage	Joseph F. Smith, Anthon H. Lund, Charles W. Penrose, John Willard Young	James E. Talmage ordained and added to Quorum
18 November 1916 – 18 January 1917	Heber J. Grant	Heber J. Grant, Rudger Clawson, Reed Smoot, Hyrum M. Smith, George Albert Smith, George F. Richards, Orson F. Whitney, David O. McKay, Anthony W. Ivins, Joseph Fielding Smith, James E. Talmage	Joseph F. Smith, Anthon H. Lund, Charles W. Penrose, John Willard Young	Death of Francis M. Lyman
18 January 1917 – 23 January 1918	Heber J. Grant	Heber J. Grant, Rudger Clawson, Reed Smoot, Hyrum M. Smith, George Albert Smith, George F. Richards, Orson F. Whitney, David O. McKay, Anthony W. Ivins, Joseph Fielding Smith, James E. Talmage, Stephen L Richards	Joseph F. Smith, Anthon H. Lund, Charles W. Penrose, John Willard Young	Stephen L Richards ordained and added to Quorum
23 January 1918 – 7 April 1918	Heber J. Grant	Heber J. Grant, Rudger Clawson, Reed Smoot, George Albert Smith, George F. Richards, Orson F. Whitney, David O. McKay, Anthony W. Ivins, Joseph Fielding Smith, James E. Talmage, Stephen L Richards	Joseph F. Smith, Anthon H. Lund, Charles W. Penrose, John Willard Young	Death of Hyrum M. Smith
7 April 1918 – 19 November 1918	Heber J. Grant	Heber J. Grant, Rudger Clawson, Reed Smoot, George Albert Smith, George F. Richards, Orson F. Whitney, David O. McKay, Anthony W. Ivins, Joseph Fielding Smith, James E. Talmage, Stephen L Richards, Richard R. Lyman	Joseph F. Smith, Anthon H. Lund, Charles W. Penrose, John Willard Young	Richard R. Lyman ordained and added to Quorum
19 November 1918 – 23 November 1918	Heber J. Grant	Heber J. Grant, Anthon H. Lund, Rudger Clawson, Reed Smoot, George Albert Smith, Charles W. Penrose, George F. Richards, Orson F. Whitney, David O. McKay, Anthony W. Ivins, Joseph Fielding Smith, James E. Talmage, Stephen L Richards, Richard R. Lyman	John Willard Young,	Death of Joseph F. Smith; First Presidency dissolved; surviving members of First Presidency return to the Quorum.
23 November 1918 – 7 January 1919	Anthon H. Lund; Rudger Clawson (Acting President)	Rudger Clawson, Reed Smoot, George Albert Smith, George F. Richards, Orson F. Whitney, David O. McKay, Anthony W. Ivins, Joseph Fielding Smith, James E. Talmage, Stephen L Richards, Richard R. Lyman	Heber J. Grant, Anthon H. Lund, Charles W. Penrose, John Willard Young	First Presidency reorganized (Heber J. Grant, Anthon H. Lund, Charles W. Penrose)
7 January 1919 – 2 March 1921	Anthon H. Lund; Rudger Clawson (Acting President)	Rudger Clawson, Reed Smoot, George Albert Smith, George F. Richards, Orson F. Whitney, David O. McKay, Anthony W. Ivins, Joseph Fielding Smith, James E. Talmage, Stephen L Richards, Richard R. Lyman, Melvin J. Ballard	Heber J. Grant, Anthon H. Lund, Charles W. Penrose, John Willard Young	Melvin J. Ballard ordained and added to Quorum
2 March 1921 – 10 March 1921	Rudger Clawson	Rudger Clawson, Reed Smoot, George Albert Smith, George F. Richards, Orson F. Whitney, David O. McKay, Anthony W. Ivins, Joseph Fielding Smith, James E. Talmage, Stephen L Richards, Richard R. Lyman, Melvin J. Ballard	Heber J. Grant, Charles W. Penrose, John Willard Young	Death of Anthon H. Lund
10 March 1921 – 17 March 1921	Rudger Clawson	Rudger Clawson, Reed Smoot, George Albert Smith, George F. Richards, Orson F. Whitney, David O. McKay, Joseph Fielding Smith, James E. Talmage, Stephen L Richards, Richard R. Lyman, Melvin J. Ballard	Heber J. Grant, Charles W. Penrose, Anthony W. Ivins, John Willard Young	Anthony W. Ivins added to First Presidency
17 March 1921 – 12 February 1924	Rudger Clawson	Rudger Clawson, Reed Smoot, George Albert Smith, George F. Richards, Orson F. Whitney, David O. McKay, Joseph Fielding Smith, James E. Talmage, Stephen L Richards, Richard R. Lyman, Melvin J. Ballard, John A. Widtsoe	Heber J. Grant, Charles W. Penrose, Anthony W. Ivins, John Willard Young	John A. Widtsoe ordained and added to Quorum
12 February 1924 – 16 May 1925	Rudger Clawson	Rudger Clawson, Reed Smoot, George Albert Smith, George F. Richards, Orson F. Whitney, David O. McKay, Joseph Fielding Smith, James E. Talmage, Stephen L Richards, Richard R. Lyman, Melvin J. Ballard, John A. Widtsoe	Heber J. Grant, Charles W. Penrose, Anthony W. Ivins	Death of John Willard Young (no change to Quorum or to First Presidency)
16 May 1925 – 16 May 1931	Rudger Clawson	Rudger Clawson, Reed Smoot, George Albert Smith, George F. Richards, Orson F. Whitney, David O. McKay, Joseph Fielding Smith, James E. Talmage, Stephen L Richards, Richard R. Lyman, Melvin J. Ballard, John A. Widtsoe	Heber J. Grant, Anthony W. Ivins	Death of Charles W. Penrose (Charles W. Nibley later called as member of the First Presidency)
16 May 1931 – 8 October 1931	Rudger Clawson	Rudger Clawson, Reed Smoot, George Albert Smith, George F. Richards, David O. McKay, Joseph Fielding Smith, James E. Talmage, Stephen L Richards, Richard R. Lyman, Melvin J. Ballard, John A. Widtsoe	Heber J. Grant, Anthony W. Ivins	Death of Orson F. Whitney
8 October 1931 – 27 July 1933	Rudger Clawson	Rudger Clawson, Reed Smoot, George Albert Smith, George F. Richards, David O. McKay, Joseph Fielding Smith, James E. Talmage, Stephen L Richards, Richard R. Lyman, Melvin J. Ballard, John A. Widtsoe, Joseph F. Merrill	Heber J. Grant, Anthony W. Ivins	Joseph F. Merrill ordained and added to Quorum
27 July 1933 – 12 October 1933	Rudger Clawson	Rudger Clawson, Reed Smoot, George Albert Smith, George F. Richards, David O. McKay, Joseph Fielding Smith, Stephen L Richards, Richard R. Lyman, Melvin J. Ballard, John A. Widtsoe, Joseph F. Merrill	Heber J. Grant, Anthony W. Ivins	Death of James E. Talmage
12 October 1933 – 23 September 1934	Rudger Clawson	Rudger Clawson, Reed Smoot, George Albert Smith, George F. Richards, David O. McKay, Joseph Fielding Smith, Stephen L Richards, Richard R. Lyman, Melvin J. Ballard, John A. Widtsoe, Joseph F. Merrill, Charles A. Callis	Heber J. Grant, Anthony W. Ivins	Charles A. Callis ordained and added to Quorum
23 September 1934 – 11 October 1934	Rudger Clawson	Rudger Clawson, Reed Smoot, George Albert Smith, George F. Richards, David O. McKay, Joseph Fielding Smith, Stephen L Richards, Richard R. Lyman, Melvin J. Ballard, John A. Widtsoe, Joseph F. Merrill, Charles A. Callis	Heber J. Grant	Death of Anthony W. Ivins
11 October 1934 – 22 December 1936	Rudger Clawson	Rudger Clawson, Reed Smoot, George Albert Smith, George F. Richards, Joseph Fielding Smith, Stephen L Richards, Richard R. Lyman, Melvin J. Ballard, John A. Widtsoe, Joseph F. Merrill, Charles A. Callis, Alonzo A. Hinckley	Heber J. Grant, David O. McKay, J. Reuben Clark, Jr.	J. Reuben Clark, Jr. and Alonzo A. Hinckley ordained; Alonzo A. Hinckley added to Quorum; David O. McKay added to First Presidency
22 December 1936 – 8 April 1937	Rudger Clawson	Rudger Clawson, Reed Smoot, George Albert Smith, George F. Richards, Joseph Fielding Smith, Stephen L Richards, Richard R. Lyman, Melvin J. Ballard, John A. Widtsoe, Joseph F. Merrill, Charles A. Callis	Heber J. Grant, David O. McKay, J. Reuben Clark, Jr.	Death of Alonzo A. Hinckley
8 April 1937 – 6 April 1938	Rudger Clawson	Rudger Clawson, Reed Smoot, George Albert Smith, George F. Richards, Joseph Fielding Smith, Stephen L Richards, Richard R. Lyman, Melvin J. Ballard, John A. Widtsoe, Joseph F. Merrill, Charles A. Callis, Albert E. Bowen	Heber J. Grant, David O. McKay, J. Reuben Clark, Jr.	Albert E. Bowen ordained and added to Quorum
6 April 1938 – 30 July 1939	Rudger Clawson	Rudger Clawson, Reed Smoot, George Albert Smith, George F. Richards, Joseph Fielding Smith, Stephen L Richards, Richard R. Lyman, Melvin J. Ballard, John A. Widtsoe, Joseph F. Merrill, Charles A. Callis, Albert E. Bowen	Heber J. Grant, David O. McKay, J. Reuben Clark, Jr., Sylvester Q. Cannon	Sylvester Q. Cannon ordained; not added to Quorum due to an excess of Apostles
30 July 1939 – 6 October 1939	Rudger Clawson	Rudger Clawson, Reed Smoot, George Albert Smith, George F. Richards, Joseph Fielding Smith, Stephen L Richards, Richard R. Lyman, John A. Widtsoe, Joseph F. Merrill, Charles A. Callis, Albert E. Bowen	Heber J. Grant, David O. McKay, J. Reuben Clark, Jr., Sylvester Q. Cannon	Death of Melvin J. Ballard
6 October 1939 – 9 February 1941	Rudger Clawson	Rudger Clawson, Reed Smoot, George Albert Smith, George F. Richards, Joseph Fielding Smith, Stephen L Richards, Richard R. Lyman, John A. Widtsoe, Joseph F. Merrill, Charles A. Callis, Albert E. Bowen, Sylvester Q. Cannon	Heber J. Grant, David O. McKay, J. Reuben Clark, Jr.	Sylvester Q. Cannon added to Quorum
9 February 1941 – 10 April 1941	Rudger Clawson	Rudger Clawson, George Albert Smith, George F. Richards, Joseph Fielding Smith, Stephen L Richards, Richard R. Lyman, John A. Widtsoe, Joseph F. Merrill, Charles A. Callis, Albert E. Bowen, Sylvester Q. Cannon	Heber J. Grant, David O. McKay, J. Reuben Clark, Jr.	Death of Reed Smoot
10 April 1941 – 29 May 1943	Rudger Clawson	Rudger Clawson, George Albert Smith, George F. Richards, Joseph Fielding Smith, Stephen L Richards, Richard R. Lyman, John A. Widtsoe, Joseph F. Merrill, Charles A. Callis, Albert E. Bowen, Sylvester Q. Cannon, Harold B. Lee	Heber J. Grant, David O. McKay, J. Reuben Clark, Jr.	Harold B. Lee ordained and added to Quorum
29 May 1943 – 21 June 1943	Rudger Clawson	Rudger Clawson, George Albert Smith, George F. Richards, Joseph Fielding Smith, Stephen L Richards, Richard R. Lyman, John A. Widtsoe, Joseph F. Merrill, Charles A. Callis, Albert E. Bowen, Harold B. Lee	Heber J. Grant, David O. McKay, J. Reuben Clark, Jr.	Death of Sylvester Q. Cannon
21 June 1943 – 7 October 1943	George Albert Smith	George Albert Smith, George F. Richards, Joseph Fielding Smith, Stephen L Richards, Richard R. Lyman, John A. Widtsoe, Joseph F. Merrill, Charles A. Callis, Albert E. Bowen, Harold B. Lee	Heber J. Grant, David O. McKay, J. Reuben Clark, Jr.	Death of Rudger Clawson
7 October 1943 – 12 November 1943	George Albert Smith	George Albert Smith, George F. Richards, Joseph Fielding Smith, Stephen L Richards, Richard R. Lyman, John A. Widtsoe, Joseph F. Merrill, Charles A. Callis, Albert E. Bowen, Harold B. Lee, Spencer W. Kimball, Ezra Taft Benson	Heber J. Grant, David O. McKay, J. Reuben Clark, Jr.	Spencer W. Kimball and Ezra Taft Benson ordained and added to Quorum
12 November 1943 – 20 April 1944	George Albert Smith	George Albert Smith, George F. Richards, Joseph Fielding Smith, Stephen L Richards, John A. Widtsoe, Joseph F. Merrill, Charles A. Callis, Albert E. Bowen, Harold B. Lee, Spencer W. Kimball, Ezra Taft Benson	Heber J. Grant, David O. McKay, J. Reuben Clark, Jr.	Richard R. Lyman excommunicated for unlawful cohabitation and adultery
20 April 1944 – 14 May 1945	George Albert Smith	George Albert Smith, George F. Richards, Joseph Fielding Smith, Stephen L Richards, John A. Widtsoe, Joseph F. Merrill, Charles A. Callis, Albert E. Bowen, Harold B. Lee, Spencer W. Kimball, Ezra Taft Benson, Mark E. Petersen	Heber J. Grant, David O. McKay, J. Reuben Clark, Jr.	Mark E. Petersen ordained and added to Quorum
14 May 1945 – 21 May 1945	George Albert Smith	George Albert Smith, George F. Richards, David O. McKay, Joseph Fielding Smith, Stephen L Richards, John A. Widtsoe, Joseph F. Merrill, Charles A. Callis, J. Reuben Clark, Jr., Albert E. Bowen, Harold B. Lee, Spencer W. Kimball, Ezra Taft Benson, Mark E. Petersen		Death of Heber J. Grant; First Presidency dissolved; surviving members of First Presidency return to the Quorum.
21 May 1945 – 11 October 1945	George F. Richards	George F. Richards, Joseph Fielding Smith, Stephen L Richards, John A. Widtsoe, Joseph F. Merrill, Charles A. Callis, Albert E. Bowen, Harold B. Lee, Spencer W. Kimball, Ezra Taft Benson, Mark E. Petersen	George Albert Smith, David O. McKay, J. Reuben Clark, Jr.	First Presidency reorganized (George Albert Smith, J. Reuben Clark, Jr., David O. McKay)
11 October 1945 – 21 January 1947	George F. Richards	George F. Richards, Joseph Fielding Smith, Stephen L Richards, John A. Widtsoe, Joseph F. Merrill, Charles A. Callis, Albert E. Bowen, Harold B. Lee, Spencer W. Kimball, Ezra Taft Benson, Mark E. Petersen, Matthew Cowley	George Albert Smith, David O. McKay, J. Reuben Clark, Jr.	Matthew Cowley ordained and added to Quorum
21 January 1947 – 10 April 1947	George F. Richards	George F. Richards, Joseph Fielding Smith, Stephen L Richards, John A. Widtsoe, Joseph F. Merrill, Albert E. Bowen, Harold B. Lee, Spencer W. Kimball, Ezra Taft Benson, Mark E. Petersen, Matthew Cowley	George Albert Smith, David O. McKay, J. Reuben Clark, Jr.	Death of Charles A. Callis
10 April 1947 – 8 August 1950	George F. Richards	George F. Richards, Joseph Fielding Smith, Stephen L Richards, John A. Widtsoe, Joseph F. Merrill, Albert E. Bowen, Harold B. Lee, Spencer W. Kimball, Ezra Taft Benson, Mark E. Petersen, Matthew Cowley, Henry D. Moyle	George Albert Smith, David O. McKay, J. Reuben Clark, Jr.	Henry D. Moyle ordained and added to Quorum
8 August 1950 – 5 October 1950	David O. McKay; Joseph Fielding Smith (Acting President)	Joseph Fielding Smith, Stephen L Richards, John A. Widtsoe, Joseph F. Merrill, Albert E. Bowen, Harold B. Lee, Spencer W. Kimball, Ezra Taft Benson, Mark E. Petersen, Matthew Cowley, Henry D. Moyle	George Albert Smith, David O. McKay, J. Reuben Clark, Jr.	Death of George F. Richards
5 October 1950 – 4 April 1951	David O. McKay; Joseph Fielding Smith (Acting President)	Joseph Fielding Smith, Stephen L Richards, John A. Widtsoe, Joseph F. Merrill, Albert E. Bowen, Harold B. Lee, Spencer W. Kimball, Ezra Taft Benson, Mark E. Petersen, Matthew Cowley, Henry D. Moyle, Delbert L. Stapley	George Albert Smith, David O. McKay, J. Reuben Clark, Jr.	Delbert L. Stapley ordained and added to Quorum
4 April 1951 – 9 April 1951	David O. McKay	David O. McKay, Joseph Fielding Smith, Stephen L Richards, John A. Widtsoe, Joseph F. Merrill, J. Reuben Clark, Jr., Albert E. Bowen, Harold B. Lee, Spencer W. Kimball, Ezra Taft Benson, Mark E. Petersen, Matthew Cowley, Henry D. Moyle, Delbert L. Stapley		Death of George Albert Smith; First Presidency dissolved; surviving members of First Presidency return to the Quorum.
9 April 1951 – 11 October 1951	Joseph Fielding Smith	Joseph Fielding Smith, John A. Widtsoe, Joseph F. Merrill, Albert E. Bowen, Harold B. Lee, Spencer W. Kimball, Ezra Taft Benson, Mark E. Petersen, Matthew Cowley, Henry D. Moyle, Delbert L. Stapley	David O. McKay, Stephen L Richards, J. Reuben Clark, Jr.	First Presidency reorganized (David O. McKay, Stephen L Richards, J. Reuben Clark, Jr.)
11 October 1951 – 3 February 1952	Joseph Fielding Smith	Joseph Fielding Smith, John A. Widtsoe, Joseph F. Merrill, Albert E. Bowen, Harold B. Lee, Spencer W. Kimball, Ezra Taft Benson, Mark E. Petersen, Matthew Cowley, Henry D. Moyle, Delbert L. Stapley, Marion G. Romney	David O. McKay, Stephen L Richards, J. Reuben Clark, Jr.	Marion G. Romney ordained and added to Quorum
3 February 1952 – 10 April 1952	Joseph Fielding Smith	Joseph Fielding Smith, John A. Widtsoe, Albert E. Bowen, Harold B. Lee, Spencer W. Kimball, Ezra Taft Benson, Mark E. Petersen, Matthew Cowley, Henry D. Moyle, Delbert L. Stapley, Marion G. Romney	David O. McKay, Stephen L Richards, J. Reuben Clark, Jr.	Death of Joseph F. Merrill
10 April 1952 – 29 November 1952	Joseph Fielding Smith	Joseph Fielding Smith, John A. Widtsoe, Albert E. Bowen, Harold B. Lee, Spencer W. Kimball, Ezra Taft Benson, Mark E. Petersen, Matthew Cowley, Henry D. Moyle, Delbert L. Stapley, Marion G. Romney, LeGrand Richards	David O. McKay, Stephen L Richards, J. Reuben Clark, Jr.	LeGrand Richards ordained and added to Quorum
29 November 1952 – 9 April 1953	Joseph Fielding Smith	Joseph Fielding Smith, Albert E. Bowen, Harold B. Lee, Spencer W. Kimball, Ezra Taft Benson, Mark E. Petersen, Matthew Cowley, Henry D. Moyle, Delbert L. Stapley, Marion G. Romney, LeGrand Richards	David O. McKay, Stephen L Richards, J. Reuben Clark, Jr.	Death of John A. Widtsoe
9 April 1953 – 15 July 1953	Joseph Fielding Smith	Joseph Fielding Smith, Albert E. Bowen, Harold B. Lee, Spencer W. Kimball, Ezra Taft Benson, Mark E. Petersen, Matthew Cowley, Henry D. Moyle, Delbert L. Stapley, Marion G. Romney, LeGrand Richards, Adam S. Bennion	David O. McKay, Stephen L Richards, J. Reuben Clark, Jr.	Adam S. Bennion ordained and added to Quorum
15 July 1953 – 8 October 1953	Joseph Fielding Smith	Joseph Fielding Smith, Harold B. Lee, Spencer W. Kimball, Ezra Taft Benson, Mark E. Petersen, Matthew Cowley, Henry D. Moyle, Delbert L. Stapley, Marion G. Romney, LeGrand Richards, Adam S. Bennion	David O. McKay, Stephen L Richards, J. Reuben Clark, Jr.	Death of Albert E. Bowen
8 October 1953 – 13 December 1953	Joseph Fielding Smith	Joseph Fielding Smith, Harold B. Lee, Spencer W. Kimball, Ezra Taft Benson, Mark E. Petersen, Matthew Cowley, Henry D. Moyle, Delbert L. Stapley, Marion G. Romney, LeGrand Richards, Adam S. Bennion, Richard L. Evans	David O. McKay, Stephen L Richards, J. Reuben Clark, Jr.	Richard L. Evans ordained and added to Quorum
13 December 1953 – 8 April 1954	Joseph Fielding Smith	Joseph Fielding Smith, Harold B. Lee, Spencer W. Kimball, Ezra Taft Benson, Mark E. Petersen, Henry D. Moyle, Delbert L. Stapley, Marion G. Romney, LeGrand Richards, Adam S. Bennion, Richard L. Evans	David O. McKay, Stephen L Richards, J. Reuben Clark, Jr.	Death of Matthew Cowley
8 April 1954 – 11 February 1958	Joseph Fielding Smith	Joseph Fielding Smith, Harold B. Lee, Spencer W. Kimball, Ezra Taft Benson, Mark E. Petersen, Henry D. Moyle, Delbert L. Stapley, Marion G. Romney, LeGrand Richards, Adam S. Bennion, Richard L. Evans, George Q. Morris	David O. McKay, Stephen L Richards, J. Reuben Clark, Jr.	George Q. Morris ordained and added to Quorum
11 February 1958 – 10 April 1958	Joseph Fielding Smith	Joseph Fielding Smith, Harold B. Lee, Spencer W. Kimball, Ezra Taft Benson, Mark E. Petersen, Henry D. Moyle, Delbert L. Stapley, Marion G. Romney, LeGrand Richards, Richard L. Evans, George Q. Morris	David O. McKay, Stephen L Richards, J. Reuben Clark, Jr.	Death of Adam S. Bennion
10 April 1958 – 19 May 1959	Joseph Fielding Smith	Joseph Fielding Smith, Harold B. Lee, Spencer W. Kimball, Ezra Taft Benson, Mark E. Petersen, Henry D. Moyle, Delbert L. Stapley, Marion G. Romney, LeGrand Richards, Richard L. Evans, George Q. Morris, Hugh B. Brown	David O. McKay, Stephen L Richards, J. Reuben Clark, Jr.	Hugh B. Brown ordained and added to Quorum
19 May 1959 – 12 June 1959	Joseph Fielding Smith	Joseph Fielding Smith, Harold B. Lee, Spencer W. Kimball, Ezra Taft Benson, Mark E. Petersen, Henry D. Moyle, Delbert L. Stapley, Marion G. Romney, LeGrand Richards, Richard L. Evans, George Q. Morris, Hugh B. Brown	David O. McKay, J. Reuben Clark, Jr.	Death of Stephen L Richards
12 June 1959 – 15 October 1959	Joseph Fielding Smith	Joseph Fielding Smith, Harold B. Lee, Spencer W. Kimball, Ezra Taft Benson, Mark E. Petersen, Delbert L. Stapley, Marion G. Romney, LeGrand Richards, Richard L. Evans, George Q. Morris, Hugh B. Brown	David O. McKay, J. Reuben Clark, Jr., Henry D. Moyle	Henry D. Moyle added to First Presidency
15 October 1959 – 22 June 1961	Joseph Fielding Smith	Joseph Fielding Smith, Harold B. Lee, Spencer W. Kimball, Ezra Taft Benson, Mark E. Petersen, Delbert L. Stapley, Marion G. Romney, LeGrand Richards, Richard L. Evans, George Q. Morris, Hugh B. Brown, Howard W. Hunter	David O. McKay, J. Reuben Clark, Jr., Henry D. Moyle	Howard W. Hunter ordained and added to Quorum
22 June 1961 – 5 October 1961	Joseph Fielding Smith	Joseph Fielding Smith, Harold B. Lee, Spencer W. Kimball, Ezra Taft Benson, Mark E. Petersen, Delbert L. Stapley, Marion G. Romney, LeGrand Richards, Richard L. Evans, George Q. Morris, Howard W. Hunter	David O. McKay, J. Reuben Clark, Jr., Henry D. Moyle, Hugh B. Brown	Hugh B. Brown added to First Presidency
5 October 1961 – 6 October 1961	Joseph Fielding Smith	Joseph Fielding Smith, Harold B. Lee, Spencer W. Kimball, Ezra Taft Benson, Mark E. Petersen, Delbert L. Stapley, Marion G. Romney, LeGrand Richards, Richard L. Evans, George Q. Morris, Howard W. Hunter, Gordon B. Hinckley	David O. McKay, J. Reuben Clark, Jr., Henry D. Moyle, Hugh B. Brown	Gordon B. Hinckley ordained and added to Quorum
6 October 1961 – 23 April 1962	Joseph Fielding Smith	Joseph Fielding Smith, Harold B. Lee, Spencer W. Kimball, Ezra Taft Benson, Mark E. Petersen, Delbert L. Stapley, Marion G. Romney, LeGrand Richards, Richard L. Evans, George Q. Morris, Howard W. Hunter, Gordon B. Hinckley	David O. McKay, Henry D. Moyle, Hugh B. Brown	Death of J. Reuben Clark, Jr.
23 April 1962 – 11 October 1962	Joseph Fielding Smith	Joseph Fielding Smith, Harold B. Lee, Spencer W. Kimball, Ezra Taft Benson, Mark E. Petersen, Delbert L. Stapley, Marion G. Romney, LeGrand Richards, Richard L. Evans, Howard W. Hunter, Gordon B. Hinckley	David O. McKay, Henry D. Moyle, Hugh B. Brown	Death of George Q. Morris
11 October 1962 – 18 September 1963	Joseph Fielding Smith	Joseph Fielding Smith, Harold B. Lee, Spencer W. Kimball, Ezra Taft Benson, Mark E. Petersen, Delbert L. Stapley, Marion G. Romney, LeGrand Richards, Richard L. Evans, Howard W. Hunter, Gordon B. Hinckley, N. Eldon Tanner	David O. McKay, Henry D. Moyle, Hugh B. Brown	N. Eldon Tanner ordained and added to Quorum
18 September 1963 – 4 October 1963	Joseph Fielding Smith	Joseph Fielding Smith, Harold B. Lee, Spencer W. Kimball, Ezra Taft Benson, Mark E. Petersen, Delbert L. Stapley, Marion G. Romney, LeGrand Richards, Richard L. Evans, Howard W. Hunter, Gordon B. Hinckley, N. Eldon Tanner	David O. McKay, Hugh B. Brown	Death of Henry D. Moyle
4 October 1963 – 10 October 1963	Joseph Fielding Smith	Joseph Fielding Smith, Harold B. Lee, Spencer W. Kimball, Ezra Taft Benson, Mark E. Petersen, Delbert L. Stapley, Marion G. Romney, LeGrand Richards, Richard L. Evans, Howard W. Hunter, Gordon B. Hinckley	David O. McKay, Hugh B. Brown, N. Eldon Tanner	N. Eldon Tanner added to First Presidency
10 October 1963 – 5 October 1967	Joseph Fielding Smith	Joseph Fielding Smith, Harold B. Lee, Spencer W. Kimball, Ezra Taft Benson, Mark E. Petersen, Delbert L. Stapley, Marion G. Romney, LeGrand Richards, Richard L. Evans, Howard W. Hunter, Gordon B. Hinckley, Thomas S. Monson	David O. McKay, Hugh B. Brown, N. Eldon Tanner	Thomas S. Monson ordained
5 October 1967 – 18 January 1970	Joseph Fielding Smith	Joseph Fielding Smith, Harold B. Lee, Spencer W. Kimball, Ezra Taft Benson, Mark E. Petersen, Delbert L. Stapley, Marion G. Romney, LeGrand Richards, Richard L. Evans, Howard W. Hunter, Gordon B. Hinckley, Thomas S. Monson	David O. McKay, Hugh B. Brown, N. Eldon Tanner, Alvin R. Dyer	Alvin R. Dyer ordained but not added to the Quorum
18 January 1970 – 23 January 1970	Joseph Fielding Smith	Joseph Fielding Smith, Harold B. Lee, Spencer W. Kimball, Ezra Taft Benson, Mark E. Petersen, Delbert L. Stapley, Marion G. Romney, LeGrand Richards, Richard L. Evans, Hugh B. Brown, Howard W. Hunter, Gordon B. Hinckley, N. Eldon Tanner, Thomas S. Monson	Alvin R. Dyer	Death of David O. McKay; First Presidency dissolved; surviving members of First Presidency return to the Quorum.
23 January 1970 – 9 April 1970	Harold B. Lee; Spencer W. Kimball (Acting President)	Spencer W. Kimball, Ezra Taft Benson, Mark E. Petersen, Delbert L. Stapley, Marion G. Romney, LeGrand Richards, Richard L. Evans, Hugh B. Brown, Howard W. Hunter, Gordon B. Hinckley, Thomas S. Monson	Joseph Fielding Smith, Harold B. Lee, N. Eldon Tanner, Alvin R. Dyer	First Presidency reorganized (Joseph Fielding Smith, Harold B. Lee, N. Eldon Tanner); Alvin R. Dyer not assigned to Quorum
9 April 1970 – 1 November 1971	Harold B. Lee; Spencer W. Kimball (Acting President)	Spencer W. Kimball, Ezra Taft Benson, Mark E. Petersen, Delbert L. Stapley, Marion G. Romney, LeGrand Richards, Richard L. Evans, Hugh B. Brown, Howard W. Hunter, Gordon B. Hinckley, Thomas S. Monson, Boyd K. Packer	Joseph Fielding Smith, Harold B. Lee, N. Eldon Tanner, Alvin R. Dyer	Boyd K. Packer ordained and added to Quorum
1 November 1971 – 2 December 1971	Harold B. Lee; Spencer W. Kimball (Acting President)	Spencer W. Kimball, Ezra Taft Benson, Mark E. Petersen, Delbert L. Stapley, Marion G. Romney, LeGrand Richards, Hugh B. Brown, Howard W. Hunter, Gordon B. Hinckley, Thomas S. Monson, Boyd K. Packer	Joseph Fielding Smith, Harold B. Lee, N. Eldon Tanner, Alvin R. Dyer	Death of Richard L. Evans
2 December 1971 – 2 July 1972	Harold B. Lee; Spencer W. Kimball (Acting President)	Spencer W. Kimball, Ezra Taft Benson, Mark E. Petersen, Delbert L. Stapley, Marion G. Romney, LeGrand Richards, Hugh B. Brown, Howard W. Hunter, Gordon B. Hinckley, Thomas S. Monson, Boyd K. Packer, Marvin J. Ashton	Joseph Fielding Smith, Harold B. Lee, N. Eldon Tanner, Alvin R. Dyer	Marvin J. Ashton ordained and added to Quorum
2 July 1972 – 7 July 1972	Harold B. Lee	Harold B. Lee, Spencer W. Kimball, Ezra Taft Benson, Mark E. Petersen, Delbert L. Stapley, Marion G. Romney, LeGrand Richards, Hugh B. Brown, Howard W. Hunter, Gordon B. Hinckley, N. Eldon Tanner, Thomas S. Monson, Boyd K. Packer, Marvin J. Ashton	Alvin R. Dyer	Death of Joseph Fielding Smith; First Presidency dissolved; surviving members of First Presidency return to the Quorum.
7 July 1972 – 12 October 1972	Spencer W. Kimball	Spencer W. Kimball, Ezra Taft Benson, Mark E. Petersen, Delbert L. Stapley, LeGrand Richards, Hugh B. Brown, Howard W. Hunter, Gordon B. Hinckley, Thomas S. Monson, Boyd K. Packer, Marvin J. Ashton	Harold B. Lee, N. Eldon Tanner, Marion G. Romney, Alvin R. Dyer	First Presidency reorganized (Harold B. Lee, N. Eldon Tanner, Marion G. Romney)
12 October 1972 – 26 December 1973	Spencer W. Kimball	Spencer W. Kimball, Ezra Taft Benson, Mark E. Petersen, Delbert L. Stapley, LeGrand Richards, Hugh B. Brown, Howard W. Hunter, Gordon B. Hinckley, Thomas S. Monson, Boyd K. Packer, Marvin J. Ashton, Bruce R. McConkie	Harold B. Lee, N. Eldon Tanner, Marion G. Romney, Alvin R. Dyer	Bruce R. McConkie ordained and added to Quorum
26 December 1973 – 30 December 1973	Spencer W. Kimball	Spencer W. Kimball, Ezra Taft Benson, Mark E. Petersen, Delbert L. Stapley, Marion G. Romney, LeGrand Richards, Hugh B. Brown, Howard W. Hunter, Gordon B. Hinckley, N. Eldon Tanner, Thomas S. Monson, Boyd K. Packer, Marvin J. Ashton, Bruce R. McConkie	Alvin R. Dyer	Death of Harold B. Lee; First Presidency dissolved; surviving members of First Presidency return to the Quorum.
30 December 1973 – 11 April 1974	Ezra Taft Benson	Ezra Taft Benson, Mark E. Petersen, Delbert L. Stapley, LeGrand Richards, Hugh B. Brown, Howard W. Hunter, Gordon B. Hinckley, Thomas S. Monson, Boyd K. Packer, Marvin J. Ashton, Bruce R. McConkie	Spencer W. Kimball, N. Eldon Tanner, Marion G. Romney, Alvin R. Dyer	First Presidency reorganized (Spencer W. Kimball, N. Eldon Tanner, Marion G. Romney)
11 April 1974 – 2 December 1975	Ezra Taft Benson	Ezra Taft Benson, Mark E. Petersen, Delbert L. Stapley, LeGrand Richards, Hugh B. Brown, Howard W. Hunter, Gordon B. Hinckley, Thomas S. Monson, Boyd K. Packer, Marvin J. Ashton, Bruce R. McConkie, L. Tom Perry	Spencer W. Kimball, N. Eldon Tanner, Marion G. Romney, Alvin R. Dyer	L. Tom Perry ordained and added to Quorum
2 December 1975 – 8 January 1976	Ezra Taft Benson	Ezra Taft Benson, Mark E. Petersen, Delbert L. Stapley, LeGrand Richards, Howard W. Hunter, Gordon B. Hinckley, Thomas S. Monson, Boyd K. Packer, Marvin J. Ashton, Bruce R. McConkie, L. Tom Perry	Spencer W. Kimball, N. Eldon Tanner, Marion G. Romney, Alvin R. Dyer	Death of Hugh B. Brown
8 January 1976 – 6 March 1977	Ezra Taft Benson	Ezra Taft Benson, Mark E. Petersen, Delbert L. Stapley, LeGrand Richards, Howard W. Hunter, Gordon B. Hinckley, Thomas S. Monson, Boyd K. Packer, Marvin J. Ashton, Bruce R. McConkie, L. Tom Perry, David B. Haight	Spencer W. Kimball, N. Eldon Tanner, Marion G. Romney, Alvin R. Dyer	David B. Haight ordained and added to Quorum
6 March 1977 – 19 August 1978	Ezra Taft Benson	Ezra Taft Benson, Mark E. Petersen, Delbert L. Stapley, LeGrand Richards, Howard W. Hunter, Gordon B. Hinckley, Thomas S. Monson, Boyd K. Packer, Marvin J. Ashton, Bruce R. McConkie, L. Tom Perry, David B. Haight	Spencer W. Kimball, N. Eldon Tanner, Marion G. Romney	Death of Alvin R. Dyer (no change to Quorum or First Presidency)
19 August 1978 – 1 October 1978	Ezra Taft Benson	Ezra Taft Benson, Mark E. Petersen, LeGrand Richards, Howard W. Hunter, Gordon B. Hinckley, Thomas S. Monson, Boyd K. Packer, Marvin J. Ashton, Bruce R. McConkie, L. Tom Perry, David B. Haight	Spencer W. Kimball, Marion G. Romney, N. Eldon Tanner	Death of Delbert L. Stapley
1 October 1978 – 23 July 1981	Ezra Taft Benson	Ezra Taft Benson, Mark E. Petersen, LeGrand Richards, Howard W. Hunter, Gordon B. Hinckley, Thomas S. Monson, Boyd K. Packer, Marvin J. Ashton, Bruce R. McConkie, L. Tom Perry, David B. Haight, James E. Faust	Spencer W. Kimball, N. Eldon Tanner, Marion G. Romney,	James E. Faust ordained and added to Quorum
23 July 1981 – 27 November 1982	Ezra Taft Benson	Ezra Taft Benson, Mark E. Petersen, LeGrand Richards, Howard W. Hunter, Thomas S. Monson, Boyd K. Packer, Marvin J. Ashton, Bruce R. McConkie, L. Tom Perry, David B. Haight, James E. Faust, Neal A. Maxwell	Spencer W. Kimball, N. Eldon Tanner, Marion G. Romney, Gordon B. Hinckley	Gordon B. Hinckley added to First Presidency; Neal A. Maxwell ordained and added to Quorum
27 November 1982 – 11 January 1983	Ezra Taft Benson	Ezra Taft Benson, Mark E. Petersen, LeGrand Richards, Howard W. Hunter, Thomas S. Monson, Boyd K. Packer, Marvin J. Ashton, Bruce R. McConkie, L. Tom Perry, David B. Haight, James E. Faust, Neal A. Maxwell	Spencer W. Kimball, Marion G. Romney, Gordon B. Hinckley	Death of N. Eldon Tanner
11 January 1983 – 11 January 1984	Ezra Taft Benson	Ezra Taft Benson, Mark E. Petersen, Howard W. Hunter, Thomas S. Monson, Boyd K. Packer, Marvin J. Ashton, Bruce R. McConkie, L. Tom Perry, David B. Haight, James E. Faust, Neal A. Maxwell	Spencer W. Kimball, Marion G. Romney, Gordon B. Hinckley	Death of LeGrand Richards
11 January 1984 – 7 April 1984	Ezra Taft Benson	Ezra Taft Benson, Howard W. Hunter, Thomas S. Monson, Boyd K. Packer, Marvin J. Ashton, Bruce R. McConkie, L. Tom Perry, David B. Haight, James E. Faust, Neal A. Maxwell	Spencer W. Kimball, Marion G. Romney, Gordon B. Hinckley	Death of Mark E. Petersen
7 April 1984 – 19 April 1985	Ezra Taft Benson	Ezra Taft Benson, Howard W. Hunter, Thomas S. Monson, Boyd K. Packer, Marvin J. Ashton, Bruce R. McConkie, L. Tom Perry, David B. Haight, James E. Faust, Neal A. Maxwell, Russell M. Nelson, Dallin H. Oaks	Spencer W. Kimball, Marion G. Romney, Gordon B. Hinckley	Russell M. Nelson and Dallin H. Oaks sustained and added to Quorum
19 April 1985 – 10 October 1985	Ezra Taft Benson	Ezra Taft Benson, Howard W. Hunter, Thomas S. Monson, Boyd K. Packer, Marvin J. Ashton, L. Tom Perry, David B. Haight, James E. Faust, Neal A. Maxwell, Russell M. Nelson, Dallin H. Oaks	Spencer W. Kimball, Marion G. Romney, Gordon B. Hinckley	Death of Bruce R. McConkie
10 October 1985 – 5 November 1985	Ezra Taft Benson	Ezra Taft Benson, Howard W. Hunter, Thomas S. Monson, Boyd K. Packer, Marvin J. Ashton, L. Tom Perry, David B. Haight, James E. Faust, Neal A. Maxwell, Russell M. Nelson, Dallin H. Oaks, M. Russell Ballard	Spencer W. Kimball, Marion G. Romney, Gordon B. Hinckley	M. Russell Ballard ordained and added to Quorum
5 November 1985 – 10 November 1985	Ezra Taft Benson	Ezra Taft Benson, Marion G. Romney, Howard W. Hunter, Gordon B. Hinckley, Thomas S. Monson, Boyd K. Packer, Marvin J. Ashton, L. Tom Perry, David B. Haight, James E. Faust, Neal A. Maxwell, Russell M. Nelson, Dallin H. Oaks, M. Russell Ballard		Death of Spencer W. Kimball; First Presidency dissolved; surviving members of First Presidency return to the Quorum.
10 November 1985 – 9 October 1986	Marion G. Romney; Howard W. Hunter (Acting President)	Marion G. Romney, Howard W. Hunter, Boyd K. Packer, Marvin J. Ashton, L. Tom Perry, David B. Haight, James E. Faust, Neal A. Maxwell, Russell M. Nelson, Dallin H. Oaks, M. Russell Ballard	Ezra Taft Benson, Gordon B. Hinckley, Thomas S. Monson	First Presidency reorganized (Ezra Taft Benson, Gordon B. Hinckley, Thomas S. Monson)
9 October 1986 – 20 May 1988	Marion G. Romney; Howard W. Hunter (Acting President)	Marion G. Romney, Howard W. Hunter, Boyd K. Packer, Marvin J. Ashton, L. Tom Perry, David B. Haight, James E. Faust, Neal A. Maxwell, Russell M. Nelson, Dallin H. Oaks, M. Russell Ballard, Joseph B. Wirthlin	Ezra Taft Benson, Gordon B. Hinckley, Thomas S. Monson	Joseph B. Wirthlin ordained and added to Quorum
20 May 1988 – 6 October 1988	Howard W. Hunter	Howard W. Hunter, Boyd K. Packer, Marvin J. Ashton, L. Tom Perry, David B. Haight, James E. Faust, Neal A. Maxwell, Russell M. Nelson, Dallin H. Oaks, M. Russell Ballard, Joseph B. Wirthlin	Ezra Taft Benson, Gordon B. Hinckley, Thomas S. Monson	Death of Marion G. Romney
6 October 1988 – 25 February 1994	Howard W. Hunter	Howard W. Hunter, Boyd K. Packer, Marvin J. Ashton, L. Tom Perry, David B. Haight, James E. Faust, Neal A. Maxwell, Russell M. Nelson, Dallin H. Oaks, M. Russell Ballard, Joseph B. Wirthlin, Richard G. Scott	Ezra Taft Benson, Gordon B. Hinckley, Thomas S. Monson	Richard G. Scott ordained and added to Quorum
25 February 1994 – 7 April 1994	Howard W. Hunter	Howard W. Hunter, Boyd K. Packer, L. Tom Perry, David B. Haight, James E. Faust, Neal A. Maxwell, Russell M. Nelson, Dallin H. Oaks, M. Russell Ballard, Joseph B. Wirthlin, Richard G. Scott	Ezra Taft Benson, Gordon B. Hinckley, Thomas S. Monson	Death of Marvin J. Ashton
7 April 1994 – 30 May 1994	Howard W. Hunter	Howard W. Hunter, Boyd K. Packer, L. Tom Perry, David B. Haight, James E. Faust, Neal A. Maxwell, Russell M. Nelson, Dallin H. Oaks, M. Russell Ballard, Joseph B. Wirthlin, Richard G. Scott, Robert D. Hales	Ezra Taft Benson, Gordon B. Hinckley, Thomas S. Monson	Robert D. Hales ordained and added to Quorum
30 May 1994 – 5 June 1994	Howard W. Hunter	Howard W. Hunter, Gordon B. Hinckley, Thomas S. Monson, Boyd K. Packer, L. Tom Perry, David B. Haight, James E. Faust, Neal A. Maxwell, Russell M. Nelson, Dallin H. Oaks, M. Russell Ballard, Joseph B. Wirthlin, Richard G. Scott, Robert D. Hales		Death of Ezra Taft Benson; First Presidency dissolved; surviving members of First Presidency return to the Quorum.
5 June 1994 – 23 June 1994	Gordon B. Hinckley; Boyd K. Packer (Acting President)	Boyd K. Packer, L. Tom Perry, David B. Haight, James E. Faust, Neal A. Maxwell, Russell M. Nelson, Dallin H. Oaks, M. Russell Ballard, Joseph B. Wirthlin, Richard G. Scott, Robert D. Hales	Howard W. Hunter, Gordon B. Hinckley, Thomas S. Monson	First Presidency reorganized (Howard W. Hunter, Gordon B. Hinckley, Thomas S. Monson);
23 June 1994 – 3 March 1995	Gordon B. Hinckley; Boyd K. Packer (Acting President)	Boyd K. Packer, L. Tom Perry, David B. Haight, James E. Faust, Neal A. Maxwell, Russell M. Nelson, Dallin H. Oaks, M. Russell Ballard, Joseph B. Wirthlin, Richard G. Scott, Robert D. Hales, Jeffrey R. Holland	Howard W. Hunter, Gordon B. Hinckley, Thomas S. Monson	Jeffrey R. Holland ordained and added to Quorum
3 March 1995 – 12 March 1995	Gordon B. Hinckley	Gordon B. Hinckley, Thomas S. Monson, Boyd K. Packer, L. Tom Perry, David B. Haight, James E. Faust, Neal A. Maxwell, Russell M. Nelson, Dallin H. Oaks, M. Russell Ballard, Joseph B. Wirthlin, Richard G. Scott, Robert D. Hales, Jeffrey R. Holland		Death of Howard W. Hunter; First Presidency dissolved; surviving members of First Presidency return to the Quorum.
12 March 1995 – 6 April 1995	Thomas S. Monson; Boyd K. Packer (Acting President)	Boyd K. Packer, L. Tom Perry, David B. Haight, Neal A. Maxwell, Russell M. Nelson, Dallin H. Oaks, M. Russell Ballard, Joseph B. Wirthlin, Richard G. Scott, Robert D. Hales, Jeffrey R. Holland	Gordon B. Hinckley, Thomas S. Monson, James E. Faust	First Presidency reorganized (Gordon B. Hinckley, Thomas S. Monson, James E. Faust);
6 April 1995 – 21 July 2004	Thomas S. Monson; Boyd K. Packer (Acting President)	Boyd K. Packer, L. Tom Perry, David B. Haight, Neal A. Maxwell, Russell M. Nelson, Dallin H. Oaks, M. Russell Ballard, Joseph B. Wirthlin, Richard G. Scott, Robert D. Hales, Jeffrey R. Holland, Henry B. Eyring	Gordon B. Hinckley, Thomas S. Monson, James E. Faust	Henry B. Eyring ordained and added to Quorum
21 July 2004 – 31 July 2004	Thomas S. Monson; Boyd K. Packer (Acting President)	Boyd K. Packer, L. Tom Perry, David B. Haight, Russell M. Nelson, Dallin H. Oaks, M. Russell Ballard, Joseph B. Wirthlin, Richard G. Scott, Robert D. Hales, Jeffrey R. Holland, Henry B. Eyring	Gordon B. Hinckley, Thomas S. Monson, James E. Faust	Death of Neal A. Maxwell
31 July 2004 – 7 October 2004	Thomas S. Monson; Boyd K. Packer (Acting President)	Boyd K. Packer, L. Tom Perry, Russell M. Nelson, Dallin H. Oaks, M. Russell Ballard, Joseph B. Wirthlin, Richard G. Scott, Robert D. Hales, Jeffrey R. Holland, Henry B. Eyring	Gordon B. Hinckley, Thomas S. Monson, James E. Faust	Death of David B. Haight
7 October 2004 – 10 August 2007	Thomas S. Monson; Boyd K. Packer (Acting President)	Boyd K. Packer, L. Tom Perry, Russell M. Nelson, Dallin H. Oaks, M. Russell Ballard, Joseph B. Wirthlin, Richard G. Scott, Robert D. Hales, Jeffrey R. Holland, Henry B. Eyring, Dieter F. Uchtdorf, David A. Bednar	Gordon B. Hinckley, Thomas S. Monson, James E. Faust	Dieter F. Uchtdorf and David A. Bednar added to Quorum
10 August 2007 – 6 October 2007	Thomas S. Monson; Boyd K. Packer (Acting President)	Boyd K. Packer, L. Tom Perry, Russell M. Nelson, Dallin H. Oaks, M. Russell Ballard, Joseph B. Wirthlin, Richard G. Scott, Robert D. Hales, Jeffrey R. Holland, Henry B. Eyring, Dieter F. Uchtdorf, David A. Bednar	Gordon B. Hinckley, Thomas S. Monson	Death of James E. Faust
6 October 2007 – 27 January 2008	Thomas S. Monson; Boyd K. Packer (Acting President)	Boyd K. Packer, L. Tom Perry, Russell M. Nelson, Dallin H. Oaks, M. Russell Ballard, Joseph B. Wirthlin, Richard G. Scott, Robert D. Hales, Jeffrey R. Holland, Dieter F. Uchtdorf, David A. Bednar, Quentin L. Cook	Gordon B. Hinckley, Thomas S. Monson, Henry B. Eyring	Henry B. Eyring added to the First Presidency, Quentin L. Cook added to Quorum
27 January 2008 – 3 February 2008	Thomas S. Monson	Thomas S. Monson, Boyd K. Packer, L. Tom Perry, Russell M. Nelson, Dallin H. Oaks, M. Russell Ballard, Joseph B. Wirthlin, Richard G. Scott, Robert D. Hales, Jeffrey R. Holland, Henry B. Eyring, Dieter F. Uchtdorf, David A. Bednar, Quentin L. Cook		Death of Gordon B. Hinckley; First Presidency dissolved; surviving members of First Presidency return to the Quorum
3 February 2008 – 5 April 2008	Boyd K. Packer	Boyd K. Packer, L. Tom Perry, Russell M. Nelson, Dallin H. Oaks, M. Russell Ballard, Joseph B. Wirthlin, Richard G. Scott, Robert D. Hales, Jeffrey R. Holland, David A. Bednar, Quentin L. Cook	Thomas S. Monson, Henry B. Eyring, Dieter F. Uchtdorf	First Presidency reorganized (Thomas S. Monson, Henry B. Eyring, Dieter F. Uchtdorf)
5 April 2008 – 1 December 2008	Boyd K. Packer	Boyd K. Packer, L. Tom Perry, Russell M. Nelson, Dallin H. Oaks, M. Russell Ballard, Joseph B. Wirthlin, Richard G. Scott, Robert D. Hales, Jeffrey R. Holland, David A. Bednar, Quentin L. Cook, D. Todd Christofferson	Thomas S. Monson, Henry B. Eyring, Dieter F. Uchtdorf	D. Todd Christofferson added to Quorum
1 December 2008 – 4 April 2009	Boyd K. Packer	Boyd K. Packer, L. Tom Perry, Russell M. Nelson, Dallin H. Oaks, M. Russell Ballard, Richard G. Scott, Robert D. Hales, Jeffrey R. Holland, David A. Bednar, Quentin L. Cook, D. Todd Christofferson	Thomas S. Monson, Henry B. Eyring, Dieter F. Uchtdorf	Death of Joseph B. Wirthlin
4 April 2009 – 30 May 2015	Boyd K. Packer	Boyd K. Packer, L. Tom Perry, Russell M. Nelson, Dallin H. Oaks, M. Russell Ballard, Richard G. Scott, Robert D. Hales, Jeffrey R. Holland, David A. Bednar, Quentin L. Cook, D. Todd Christofferson, Neil L. Andersen	Thomas S. Monson, Henry B. Eyring, Dieter F. Uchtdorf	Neil L. Andersen added to Quorum
30 May 2015 – 3 July 2015	Boyd K. Packer	Boyd K. Packer, Russell M. Nelson, Dallin H. Oaks, M. Russell Ballard, Richard G. Scott, Robert D. Hales, Jeffrey R. Holland, David A. Bednar, Quentin L. Cook, D. Todd Christofferson, Neil L. Andersen	Thomas S. Monson, Henry B. Eyring, Dieter F. Uchtdorf	Death of L. Tom Perry
3 July 2015 – 22 September 2015	Russell M. Nelson	Russell M. Nelson, Dallin H. Oaks, M. Russell Ballard, Richard G. Scott, Robert D. Hales, Jeffrey R. Holland, David A. Bednar, Quentin L. Cook, D. Todd Christofferson, Neil L. Andersen	Thomas S. Monson, Henry B. Eyring, Dieter F. Uchtdorf	Death of Boyd K. Packer
22 September 2015 – 3 October 2015	Russell M. Nelson	Russell M. Nelson, Dallin H. Oaks, M. Russell Ballard, Robert D. Hales, Jeffrey R. Holland, David A. Bednar, Quentin L. Cook, D. Todd Christofferson, Neil L. Andersen	Thomas S. Monson, Henry B. Eyring, Dieter F. Uchtdorf	Death of Richard G. Scott
3 October 2015 – 1 October 2017	Russell M. Nelson	Russell M. Nelson, Dallin H. Oaks, M. Russell Ballard, Robert D. Hales, Jeffrey R. Holland, David A. Bednar, Quentin L. Cook, D. Todd Christofferson, Neil L. Andersen, Ronald A. Rasband, Gary E. Stevenson, Dale G. Renlund	Thomas S. Monson, Henry B. Eyring, Dieter F. Uchtdorf	Ronald A. Rasband, Gary E. Stevenson, and Dale G. Renlund added to the Quorum
1 October 2017 – 2 January 2018	Russell M. Nelson	Russell M. Nelson, Dallin H. Oaks, M. Russell Ballard, Jeffrey R. Holland, David A. Bednar, Quentin L. Cook, D. Todd Christofferson, Neil L. Andersen, Ronald A. Rasband, Gary E. Stevenson, Dale G. Renlund	Thomas S. Monson, Henry B. Eyring, Dieter F. Uchtdorf	Death of Robert D. Hales
2 January 2018 – 14 January 2018	Russell M. Nelson	Russell M. Nelson, Dallin H. Oaks, M. Russell Ballard, Jeffrey R. Holland, Henry B. Eyring, Dieter F. Uchtdorf, David A. Bednar, Quentin L. Cook, D. Todd Christofferson, Neil L. Andersen, Ronald A. Rasband, Gary E. Stevenson, Dale G. Renlund		Death of Thomas S. Monson; First Presidency dissolved; surviving members of First Presidency return to the Quorum
14 January 2018 – 31 March 2018	Dallin H. Oaks; M. Russell Ballard (Acting President)	M. Russell Ballard, Jeffrey R. Holland, Dieter F. Uchtdorf, David A. Bednar, Quentin L. Cook, D. Todd Christofferson, Neil L. Andersen, Ronald A. Rasband, Gary E. Stevenson, Dale G. Renlund	Russell M. Nelson, Dallin H. Oaks, Henry B. Eyring	First Presidency reorganized (Russell M. Nelson, Dallin H. Oaks, Henry B. Eyring)
31 March 2018 – 12 November 2023	Dallin H. Oaks; M. Russell Ballard (Acting President)	M. Russell Ballard, Jeffrey R. Holland, Dieter F. Uchtdorf, David A. Bednar, Quentin L. Cook, D. Todd Christofferson, Neil L. Andersen, Ronald A. Rasband, Gary E. Stevenson, Dale G. Renlund, Gerrit W. Gong, Ulisses Soares	Russell M. Nelson, Dallin H. Oaks, Henry B. Eyring	Gerrit W. Gong and Ulisses Soares added to the Quorum
12 November 2023 – 15 November 2023	Dallin H. Oaks; Jeffrey R. Holland (de facto Acting President)	Jeffrey R. Holland, Dieter F. Uchtdorf, David A. Bednar, Quentin L. Cook, D. Todd Christofferson, Neil L. Andersen, Ronald A. Rasband, Gary E. Stevenson, Dale G. Renlund, Gerrit W. Gong, Ulisses Soares	Russell M. Nelson, Dallin H. Oaks, Henry B. Eyring	Death of M. Russell Ballard
15 November 2023 – 7 December 2023	Dallin H. Oaks; Jeffrey R. Holland (Acting President)	Jeffrey R. Holland, Dieter F. Uchtdorf, David A. Bednar, Quentin L. Cook, D. Todd Christofferson, Neil L. Andersen, Ronald A. Rasband, Gary E. Stevenson, Dale G. Renlund, Gerrit W. Gong, Ulisses Soares	Russell M. Nelson, Dallin H. Oaks, Henry B. Eyring	Jeffrey R. Holland set apart as Acting President
7 December 2023 – 27 September 2025	Dallin H. Oaks; Jeffrey R. Holland (Acting President)	Jeffrey R. Holland, Dieter F. Uchtdorf, David A. Bednar, Quentin L. Cook, D. Todd Christofferson, Neil L. Andersen, Ronald A. Rasband, Gary E. Stevenson, Dale G. Renlund, Gerrit W. Gong, Ulisses Soares, Patrick Kearon	Russell M. Nelson, Dallin H. Oaks, Henry B. Eyring	Patrick Kearon added to the Quorum
27 September 2025 – 14 October 2025	Dallin H. Oaks	Dallin H. Oaks, Jeffrey R. Holland, Henry B. Eyring, Dieter F. Uchtdorf, David A. Bednar, Quentin L. Cook, D. Todd Christofferson, Neil L. Andersen, Ronald A. Rasband, Gary E. Stevenson, Dale G. Renlund, Gerrit W. Gong, Ulisses Soares, Patrick Kearon		Death of Russell M. Nelson; First Presidency dissolved; surviving members of First Presidency return to the Quorum
14 October 2025 – 6 November 2025	Jeffrey R. Holland	Jeffrey R. Holland, Dieter F. Uchtdorf, David A. Bednar, Quentin L. Cook, Neil L. Andersen, Ronald A. Rasband, Gary E. Stevenson, Dale G. Renlund, Gerrit W. Gong, Ulisses Soares, Patrick Kearon	Dallin H. Oaks, Henry B. Eyring, D. Todd Christofferson	First Presidency reorganized (Dallin H. Oaks, Henry B. Eyring, D. Todd Christofferson)
6 November 2025 – 27 December 2025	Jeffrey R. Holland	Jeffrey R. Holland, Dieter F. Uchtdorf, David A. Bednar, Quentin L. Cook, Neil L. Andersen, Ronald A. Rasband, Gary E. Stevenson, Dale G. Renlund, Gerrit W. Gong, Ulisses Soares, Patrick Kearon, Gérald Caussé	Dallin H. Oaks, Henry B. Eyring, D. Todd Christofferson	Gérald Caussé added to the Quorum
27 December 2025 – 8 January 2026	Henry B. Eyring; Dieter F. Uchtdorf (de facto Acting President)	Dieter F. Uchtdorf, David A. Bednar, Quentin L. Cook, Neil L. Andersen, Ronald A. Rasband, Gary E. Stevenson, Dale G. Renlund, Gerrit W. Gong, Ulisses Soares, Patrick Kearon, Gérald Caussé	Dallin H. Oaks, Henry B. Eyring, D. Todd Christofferson	Death of Jeffrey R. Holland
8 January 2026 – 12 February 2026	Henry B. Eyring; Dieter F. Uchtdorf (Acting President)	Dieter F. Uchtdorf, David A. Bednar, Quentin L. Cook, Neil L. Andersen, Ronald A. Rasband, Gary E. Stevenson, Dale G. Renlund, Gerrit W. Gong, Ulisses Soares, Patrick Kearon, Gérald Caussé	Dallin H. Oaks, Henry B. Eyring, D. Todd Christofferson	Dieter F. Uchtdorf set apart as Acting President
12 February 2026 – present	Henry B. Eyring; Dieter F. Uchtdorf (Acting President)	Dieter F. Uchtdorf, David A. Bednar, Quentin L. Cook, Neil L. Andersen, Ronald A. Rasband, Gary E. Stevenson, Dale G. Renlund, Gerrit W. Gong, Ulisses Soares, Patrick Kearon, Gérald Caussé, Clark G. Gilbert	Dallin H. Oaks, Henry B. Eyring, D. Todd Christofferson	Clark G. Gilbert added to the Quorum

== See also ==
- Chronology of the First Presidency (LDS Church)
- List of members of the Quorum of the Twelve Apostles (LDS Church)
- List of presidents of the Church of Jesus Christ of Latter-day Saints
- President of the Church (LDS Church)
- Succession in the Presidency (LDS Church)
