= Adam S. Bennion =

American Mormon leader (1886–1958)

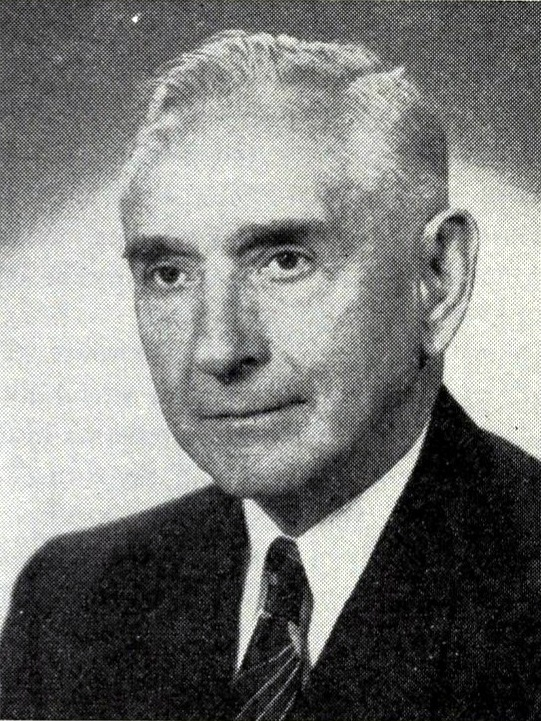

Quorum of the Twelve Apostles
- April 9, 1953 – February 11, 1958

LDS Church Apostle
- April 9, 1953 – February 11, 1958
- Reason: Death of John A. Widtsoe
- Reorganization at end of term: Hugh B. Brown ordained

Personal details
- Born: Adam Samuel Bennion; December 2, 1886; Taylorsville, Utah Territory
- Died: February 11, 1958 (aged 71); Salt Lake City, Utah, U.S.
- Resting place: Salt Lake City Cemetery; 40.777°N 111.858°W
- Spouse(s): Minerva R. Young
- Children: 5
- Parents: Joseph B. Bennion; Mary A. Sharp

Adam Samuel Bennion (December 2, 1886 – February 11, 1958) was a leader in the Church of Jesus Christ of Latter-day Saints (LDS Church). Born in Taylorsville, Utah Territory, Bennion received degrees from the University of Utah (U of U), Columbia University, and the University of California. He also studied at the University of Chicago. He became a member of the Quorum of the Twelve Apostles on April 9, 1953, filling a vacancy created by the death of John A. Widtsoe.

Bennion served less than five years in the Quorum of the Twelve before his death. He was replaced in the Quorum by Hugh B. Brown.

== Biography ==
Adam S. Bennion was the son of Joseph B. Bennion and his wife, Mary Ann Sharp. Joseph died when Bennion was about two years old. After completing his early education in Taylorsville, Bennion went to study at the U of U. After his studies he became a teacher at LDS High School in Salt Lake City.

In 1911, Bennion married Minerva Richards Young, a daughter of Richard W. Young. The couple eventually had three sons and two daughters. After their marriage, Bennion and his wife headed to New York City, where he completed a master's degree at Columbia University.

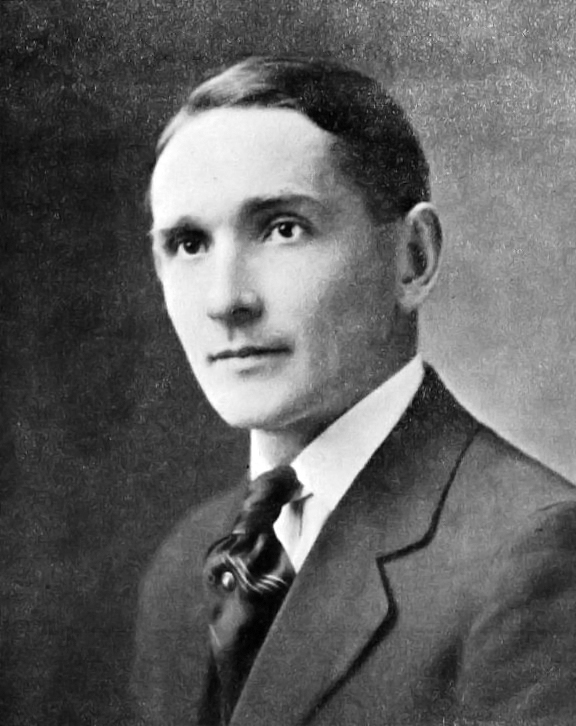
Adam S. Bennion 1922

Bennion returned to Salt Lake City and became an English teacher at Granite High School. In 1913, he became the principal of the school. In the summer of 1914, Bennion took a course in Sunday school administration at the University of Chicago. The following year, he was appointed a member of the General Board of the Deseret Sunday School Union. About the same time, he joined the faculty of the U of U in the English department. In 1915, Bennion was appointed a member of the LDS Church's Board of Education.

In 1919, Bennion became the Superintendent of LDS Church Schools. From 1921 to 1923, he studied at the University of California–Berkeley and completed a doctorate. He then returned to the LDS Church schools, where he worked until 1927 when he began work for the Utah Power and Light Company (UP&L). During the 1920s, Bennion oversaw the expansion of the LDS Church's seminary program and trained seminary teachers at Brigham Young University's Alpine Summer School.

In 1944, Bennion resigned his employment with UP&L and ran as a Republican Party candidate for the United States Senate. He lost the election to Democrat Elbert D. Thomas. Bennion returned to UP&L; in 1947, he became the director of the Denver and Rio Grande Railroad.

In 1953, LDS Church president David O. McKay called Bennion as a member of the Quorum of the Twelve Apostles. Bennion served in this capacity until his death.

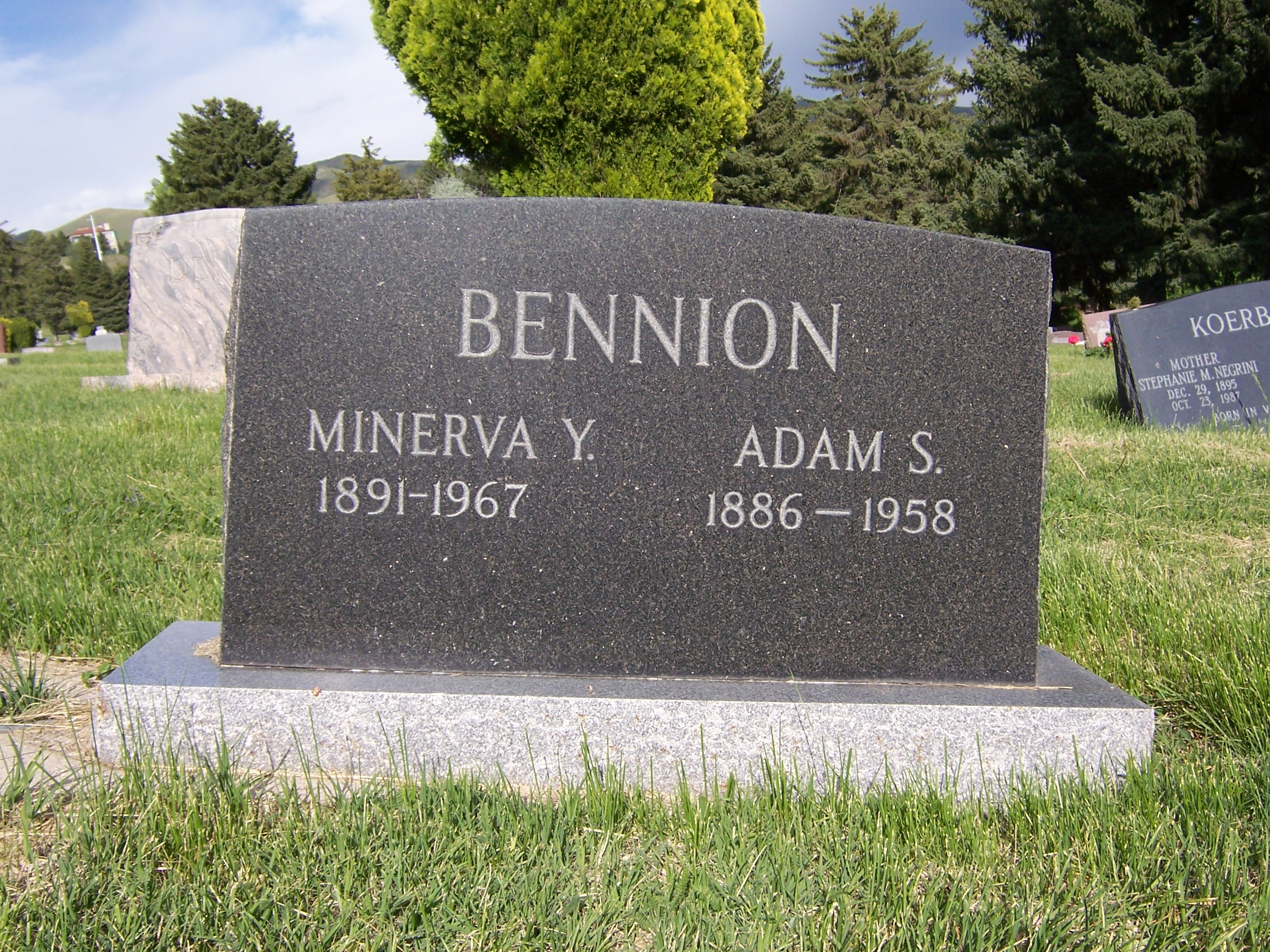
Grave marker of Adam S. Bennion.

Bennion died in Salt Lake City and was buried in Salt Lake City Cemetery.

== Published works ==
- Bennion, Adam S (1958). The Candle of the Lord. Deseret Book Company.
- Looking in on Greatness: Written for L.D.S. Junior Seminaries. Department of Education, Church of Jesus Christ of Latter-day Saints. 1935.
- Principles of Teaching. Salt Lake City, Utah: The General Boards of the Auxiliary Organizations of the Church. 1921. p. 173.
- What It Means to Be a Mormon: Written for the Deseret Sunday School. Salt Lake City, Utah: Deseret Sunday School Union. 1917. p. 176.

Party political offices
Preceded by Franklin S. Harris	Republican nominee for U.S. Senator from Utah (Class 3); 1944	Succeeded by Wallace F. Bennett
The Church of Jesus Christ of Latter-day Saints titles
Preceded by LeGrand Richards	Quorum of the Twelve Apostles; April 9, 1953 – February 11, 1958	Succeeded by Richard L. Evans
