= Robert D. Hales =

American businessman and religious leader

Quorum of the Twelve Apostles
- April 2, 1994 – October 1, 2017

LDS Church Apostle
- April 7, 1994 – October 1, 2017
- Reason: Death of Marvin J. Ashton
- Reorganization at end of term: Gerrit W. Gong and Ulisses Soares were ordained following deaths of Hales and Thomas S. Monson

Presiding Bishop
- April 6, 1985 – April 2, 1994
- End reason: Called to the Quorum of the Twelve Apostles

First Quorum of the Seventy
- October 1, 1976 – April 6, 1985
- End reason: Called as Presiding Bishop

Assistant to the Quorum of the Twelve Apostles
- April 4, 1975 – October 1, 1976
- End reason: Position abolished

Military career
- 1954-1958
- Service/branch: United States Air Force
- Rank: Captain

Personal details
- Born: Robert Dean Hales; August 24, 1932; New York City, U.S.
- Died: October 1, 2017 (aged 85); Salt Lake City, Utah, U.S.
- Resting place: Bountiful City Cemetery
- Alma mater: University of Utah; Harvard Business School
- Spouse(s): Mary Crandall (m. 1953)
- Children: 2
- Signature
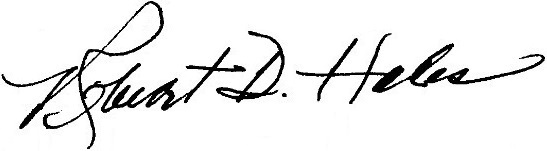

Robert Dean Hales (August 24, 1932 – October 1, 2017) was an American businessman and member of the Quorum of the Twelve Apostles of the Church of Jesus Christ of Latter-day Saints (LDS Church) from 1994 until his death. As a member of the Quorum of the Twelve, Hales was accepted by the church as a prophet, seer, and revelator. At the time of his death he was the fifth most senior apostle in the church.

== Biography ==
Hales was born in New York City and raised in both Queens and Great Neck, New York. He was the youngest of three children born to John Rulon Hales, an artist who worked in advertising primarily, and his wife, Vera Marie Holbrook. The Hales family was heavily involved in the LDS Church. The family attended the Queens Ward, which met in a rented space. As a youth Hales would help clean it from the party that had occurred the night before.

Hales played baseball while he was a student at Great Neck High School and then later at the University of Utah (U of U). He also played in some semi-professional leagues, but hurt his arm from pitching that was too intense while playing in Arizona. Prior to this injury, he had been considered to have a strong chance of playing in the major leagues. After the injury forced him out of baseball, Hales joined the Air Force ROTC unit at the U of U. While he was a student at the U of U, Hales worked for KSL-TV and KDYL. After obtaining a bachelor's degree at the U of U, he was a fighter pilot for four years in the U.S. Air Force. Hales later earned an MBA degree from the Harvard Business School (HBS) in 1960.

Hales married Mary Crandall, whom he met in New York the summer before his sophomore year of college, in the Salt Lake Temple on June 10, 1953. During the summer they were married, Hales was working at the United Nations building. Crandall, who was a student at Brigham Young University, had moved from California to New York shortly before she met Hales. They had two sons.

During his professional business career, Hales served in executive positions with four major national companies. His first job out of HBS was with the Gillette Company. To ensure a broad perspective of the business, Hales convinced management to let him work some on the factory floor and also in stocking razors in drug stores. This gave him a broad perspective that allowed him to quickly rise to senior management.

After joining the Gillette Company, he became president of Papermate, a division of Gillette. He later joined Max Factor as a vice president. Hales was appointed executive vice president for marketing of the Hughes Television Network and its division, Hughes Sports Network in 1973. Just prior to his call to be a general authority, Hales was president of Chesebrough-Pond's. One of his strengths as a businessman was being able to synthesize both financial data and a strong sense of where the market was going from interacting with it as much as possible. His presentations of new products and marketing approaches were presented in ways that to some seemed like painting ideas.

In 1987, Hales was appointed to the Utah State Board of Regents. Hales was close with the musical family, The 5 Browns, and performed the marriages for the oldest two children. In 2010, Deseret Book published a book written by Hales entitled Return.

== LDS Church service ==
While Hales was a graduate student at HBS he served in the LDS Church as an elders quorum president. He also served as a seminary teacher while he lived in Downey, California. Hales served three times in the church as a bishop (in Weston, Massachusetts; Chicago, Illinois; and Frankfurt, Germany). He served as a branch president, both in Weston and in Albany, Georgia. The assignment as branch president in Weston was while he was a student at HBS, where one of the counselors in the district presidency was Henry B. Eyring. Hales served in the branch presidency in Seville, Spain and in Germany. He also served on the stake high council, both while living in London, England and in Massachusetts. He also became a counselor in the presidency of the Boston Massachusetts Stake when it was first organized in 1960. He later served as a regional representative, with assignments in both Louisiana and Minnesota.

=== General Authority ===
In 1975, Hales was called as a general authority and became an Assistant to the Quorum of the Twelve Apostles. In 1976, the role of Assistant to the Twelve was discontinued and he, along with others serving at the time, became members of the First Quorum of the Seventy. He was the last living person who had served as an Assistant to the Twelve.

During his first decade as a general authority, Hales was given assignments related to the physical and financial operations of the LDS Church. He oversaw a reduction in the number of the church's welfare farms and also divestment from the Utah and Idaho Sugar Company.

In the late 1970s, while serving as a general authority, Hales also served as president of the church's England London Mission. After his service in London, Hales was appointed the church's Area Supervisor in Europe. In this capacity, he worked with Thomas S. Monson on supervising the church in East Germany and worked towards the building of a temple there. He also served for a time as a counselor in the Sunday School General Presidency. Hales served in the First Quorum of the Seventy until 1985 when he became the church's eleventh presiding bishop. He served as the presiding bishop until 1994, during which time he emphasized the importance of the principles of the church's welfare program.

Hales was sustained as a member of the Quorum of the Twelve on April 2, 1994. He was ordained an apostle on April 7, 1994, filling a vacancy created by the death of Marvin J. Ashton. In 2002, Hales served as chair of the church's Olympic Coordinating Council. As a native of New York City, Hales was often the church's "point man" on dealing with issues in the city. He was involved in some of the early planning that led to the building of the Manhattan New York Temple.

== Health issues and death ==
Over the years, Hales had several health issues impacting his church service. This included missing the church's April 2011 General Conference. In September 2017, he was again hospitalized and a church spokesman noted that, in view of the recommendations of attending physicians, Hales would not participate in the upcoming General Conference. Hales died on October 1, 2017, shortly after the conclusion of the conference's Sunday morning session. His death was announced by Henry B. Eyring at the beginning of the afternoon session. Funeral services for Hales were held in the Salt Lake Tabernacle in Salt Lake City, on October 6, 2017. A private burial service followed at the Bountiful City Cemetery in Bountiful, Utah.

== Bibliography ==
- Return: Four Phases of Our Mortal Journey Home (Deseret Book, June 1, 2010, ISBN 978-1570087691)
- The British Contribution to the Restored Gospel (BYU Studies, 1987, 27 (1): 12–24)

== See also ==
- Henry B. Eyring
- Glenn L. Pace

The Church of Jesus Christ of Latter-day Saints titles
Preceded by Richard G. Scott	Quorum of the Twelve Apostles; April 7, 1994 – October 1, 2017	Succeeded by Jeffrey R. Holland
Preceded by Victor L. Brown	Presiding Bishop; 1985–1994	Succeeded by Merrill J. Bateman
