= Delbert L. Stapley =

American Mormon leader (1896–1978)

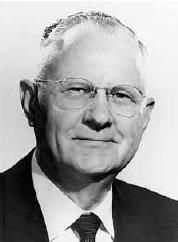

Quorum of the Twelve Apostles
- October 5, 1950 – August 19, 1978

LDS Church Apostle
- October 5, 1950 – August 19, 1978
- Reason: Death of George F. Richards
- Reorganization at end of term: James E. Faust ordained

Personal details
- Born: Delbert Leon Stapley; December 11, 1896; Mesa, Arizona Territory
- Died: August 19, 1978 (aged 81); Salt Lake City, Utah, U.S.
- Spouse(s): Ethel Burdette Davis
- Children: 3

Delbert Leon Stapley (December 11, 1896 – August 19, 1978) was a member of the Quorum of the Twelve Apostles of the Church of Jesus Christ of Latter-day Saints (LDS Church) from 1950 to 1978.

== Early life ==
Stapley was born in Mesa, Arizona Territory. He graduated from Mesa Union High School in 1914. As a youth, he rejected a chance at playing Major League Baseball so he could serve an LDS Church mission in the southern United States and because he didn't want to play on Sunday, the day Latter-day Saints observe as the Sabbath. Stapley remained physically active throughout his life, his favorite sport being golf.

Stapley was a missionary in the LDS Church's Southern States Mission from 1915 to 1917. After his mission, he was a U.S. marine in the First World War.

== LDS Church service ==
Stapley had been stake president for three years before receiving a call to the apostleship on October 5, 1950. Stapley was also sustained as a member of the Quorum of the Twelve on October 5, 1950, at the church's October general conference, filling the vacancy caused by the death of George F. Richards. Stapley was notified of his new calling by church president George Albert Smith in the elevator bank of the Hotel Utah. Stapley organized the original Miami Stake in 1961. In 1969 he received the Silver Buffalo Award from the Boy Scouts of America.

=== Views on civil rights ===
A letter sent by Stapley illustrates his views on black people before they were more widely assimilated into the LDS Church. Dated January 23, 1964 and specifically stating he was not speaking for the church or in his position as an apostle, the letter urged Michigan Governor George W. Romney to back away from certain positions for civil rights, and he called the bill that became the Civil Rights Act of 1964 "vicious legislation." Romney is reported to have accelerated his engagement for civil rights shortly after he received the letter.

== Death ==
Stapley delivered his last conference address in October 1977. The following April conference he was too ill to attend. Stapley died on August 19, 1978, in Salt Lake City, Utah. He suffered cardiac arrest at about noon while walking near his home. He was buried in the Mesa, Arizona cemetery.

At the time of his death, Stapley was the third apostle in line to the presidency of the church. His vacancy in the Quorum of the Twelve was filled by James E. Faust.

== See also ==
- The Church of Jesus Christ of Latter-day Saints in Arizona

The Church of Jesus Christ of Latter-day Saints titles
Preceded by Henry D. Moyle	Quorum of the Twelve Apostles; October 5, 1950 – August 19, 1978	Succeeded by Marion G. Romney
