= Alvin R. Dyer =

American Mormon leader (1903–1977)

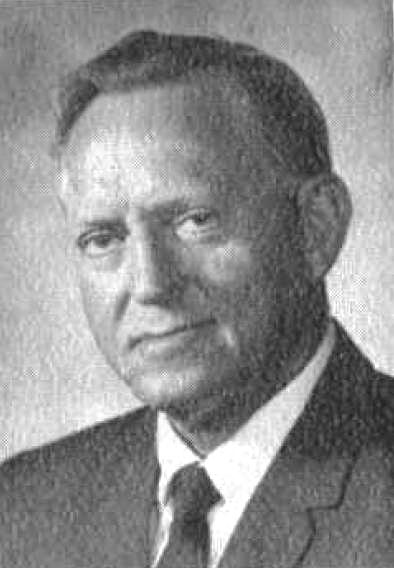

First Quorum of the Seventy
- October 1, 1976 – March 6, 1977

Assistant to the Quorum of the Twelve Apostles
- January 18, 1970 – October 1, 1976
- End reason: Position abolished

Counselor in the First Presidency
- April 6, 1968 – January 18, 1970
- End reason: Death of David O. McKay

LDS Church Apostle
- October 5, 1967 – March 6, 1977
- Reason: David O. McKay's discretion
- Reorganization at end of term: No apostles ordained

Assistant to the Quorum of the Twelve Apostles
- October 11, 1958 – October 5, 1967
- End reason: Called as a counselor in the First Presidency

Personal details
- Born: Alvin Rulon Dyer; January 1, 1903; Salt Lake City, Utah, U.S.
- Died: March 6, 1977 (aged 74); Salt Lake City, Utah, U.S.
- Resting place: Wasatch Lawn Memorial Park; 40°41′52.08″N 111°50′30.12″W
- Spouse(s): May E. Jackson
- Children: 2

Alvin Rulon Dyer (January 1, 1903 – March 6, 1977) was an apostle in the Church of Jesus Christ of Latter-day Saints (LDS Church) and served as a member of the church's First Presidency from 1968 to 1970.

Born in Salt Lake City, Utah, Dyer was ordained as apostle on October 5, 1967, (but was not added as a member of the Quorum of the Twelve Apostles) and subsequently was set apart as a counselor in the First Presidency to church president David O. McKay. After McKay's death in 1970, Dyer was returned to a position as an assistant to the Twelve Apostles, and later to the First Quorum of the Seventy when it was reconstituted in 1976. Dyer is the only person in the LDS Church's history to serve in the First Quorum of Seventy after having been ordained to the office of apostle.

== Life ==
Raised in Utah, Dyer was an accomplished baseball player as a youth, but put baseball aside to serve as a missionary for the LDS Church in the Eastern States Mission from 1922 to 1924. In 1926, he married May Elizabeth Jackson in the Salt Lake Temple.

After his mission, Dyer had the opportunity to play professional baseball, but declined the offer because he would have to play on Sundays. Instead, he studied mechanical drafting and technical engineering in order to become a sheet metal journeyman. He later managed the heating and air conditioning department of Utah Builders Supply. Eventually, he formed the Dyer Distributing Company which he owned until 1954, when he dissolved all his business interests upon being called to full-time service as a mission president for the church.

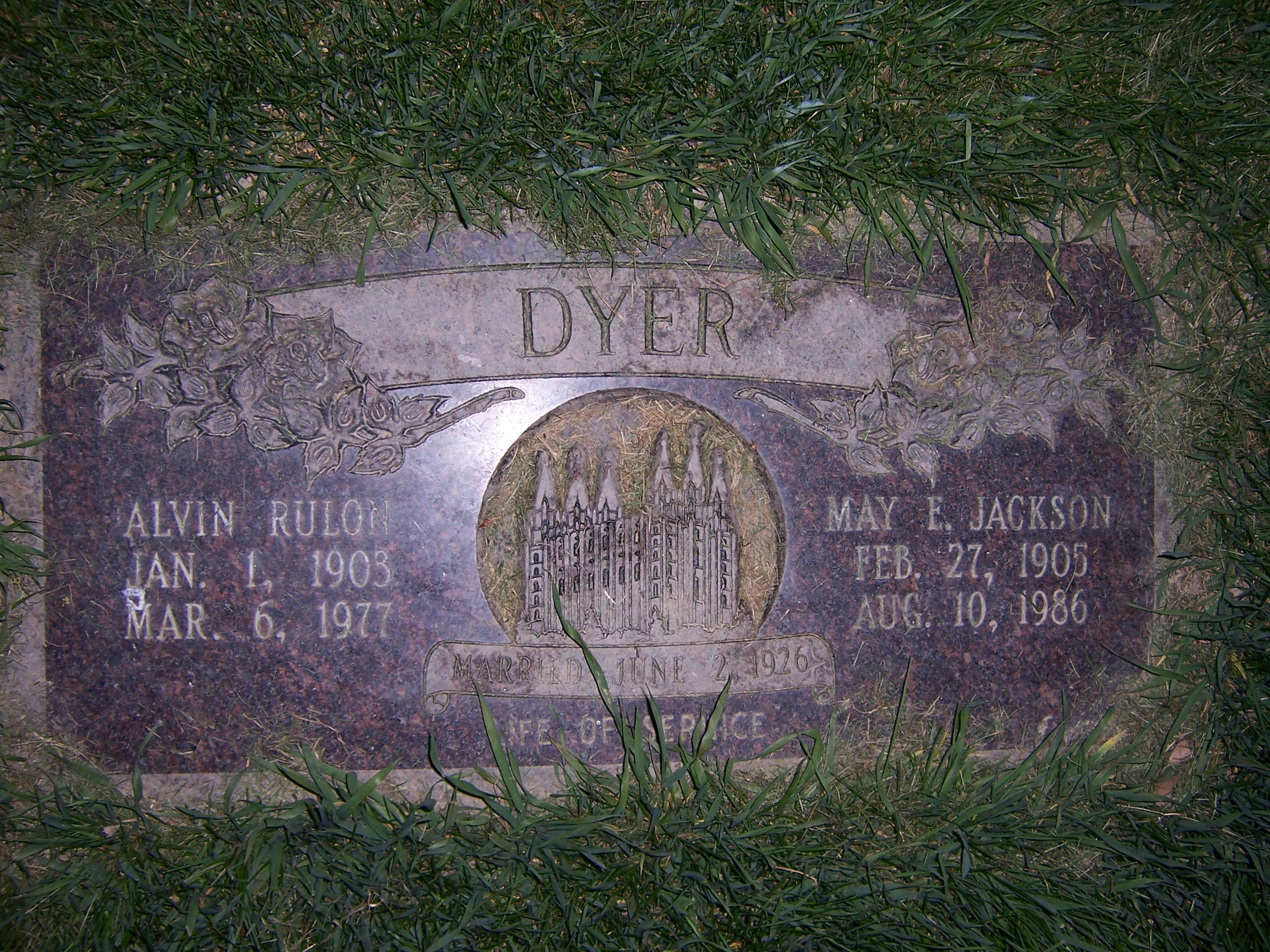
Alvin R. Dyer's grave marker

In addition to his service as a general authority, Dyer served in many capacities within the church, including bishop and stake high councilor. He served as president of the church's Central States Mission beginning in 1954, and of the European Mission from 1960 to 1962. While leading the European Mission, Dyer was an enthusiastic supporter of Henry D. Moyle's Baseball Baptism Program that accelerated the rate of baptisms among young people. He told the missionaries, "you can teach . . . everything that a person needs to know to be baptized in this Church in less than three minutes."

Aside from his business and church activities, Dyer was active in both the Missouri Historical Society and the Jackson County Historical Society. He authored a book on LDS Church history in Missouri, The Refiner's Fire, Historical Highlights of Missouri (Deseret Book, 1960).

In 1961, Dyer taught that the reason most Black members of the church were prohibited from being ordained to priesthood offices was because they were descended from Cain and thus were a "cursed lineage." Church president Spencer W. Kimball announced the end of these restrictions in 1978.

In August 1967, McKay decided to appoint Dyer as one of his counselors. McKay made the decision without consulting his other counselors, Hugh B. Brown and N. Eldon Tanner. The appointment caused some tension between Brown and Tanner and the newly called Dyer over what Dyer's role would be and whether his calling was as a counselor "to" the First Presidency or "in" the First Presidency.

In 1972, Dyer suffered a stroke that limited his activity. He died at his home in Salt Lake City, Utah in 1977.

== See also ==
- Joseph T. Bentley
