= Virginia Cutler =

American academic (1905-1993)

Virginia Farrer Cutler
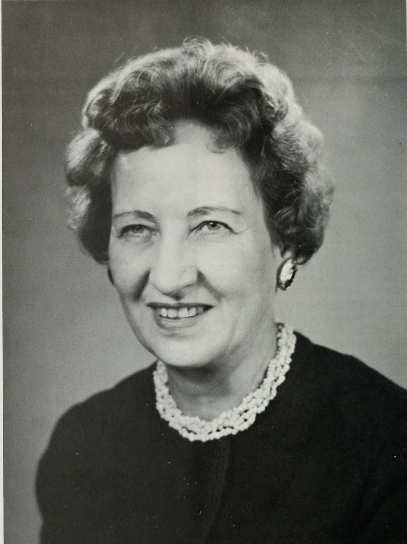
- Born: Virginia Grace Farrer; December 17, 1905; Park City, Utah, US
- Died: May 20, 1993 (aged 87); Eugene, Oregon, US
- Occupations: Teacher, University Administrator
- Board member of: White House Consumer Committee
- Spouse: Ralph Garr Cutler (m. 1929; died 1931)
- Children: Robert Garr Cutler (b. 1930); Ralph Garr Cutler (b. 1932)
- Awards: American Association of University Women Woman of the Year, 1966

Academic background
- Education: Bachelor's degree, University of Utah; Master's degree, Stanford University; PhD, Cornell University

Academic work
- Discipline: Home Economist

Virginia Farrer Cutler (December 17, 1905 – May 20, 1993) was an American academic. She was the head of the Home Economics Department at the University of Utah and dean of the College of Family Living at Brigham Young University (BYU). She also worked for the United States Point Four Program in Southeast Asia, established a home science degree at the University of Ghana, and served on the White House Consumer Committee under President Richard Nixon.

Cutler was born in Park City, Utah and was raised in Murray, Utah on a farm. After graduating from high school, she studied education at the University of Utah on a four-year scholarship and graduated in 1927. She married Ralph Garr Cutler in 1929, gave birth to two sons, and became a widow in 1931, just two years after her marriage. She taught school in Utah in order to support her family before moving to California to attend Stanford University. After graduating from Stanford with her master's degree in 1937, Cutler enrolled in Cornell University, receiving her doctorate in 1946. She then became the head of the Home Economics Department at the University of Utah, where she helped establish the Sterling Sill Home Living Center and advocated for higher education for women. She later served as dean of the College of Family Living at Brigham Young University from 1961 to 1972. In between her years working as a university administrator, Cutler traveled to Thailand and Indonesia through the United States Point Four Program (sponsored by the US Department of State) to work as an education advisor and economic consultant. She stayed in Southeast Asia for a total of seven years, establishing schools and training new teachers. Then, in 1966, Cutler traveled to Ghana to establish the Department of Home Science at the University of Ghana. Later in her life, she served as president of the Utah chapter of the American Association of University Women and as a member of the White House Consumer Committee from 1972 to 1975. She died on May 20, 1993, having received multiple honors and awards. The Virginia F. Cutler Lecture Series, held annually at Brigham Young University by the College of Family, Home, and Social Sciences, is named after her.

== Early years ==
Virginia Grace Farrer Cutler was born on December 17, 1905, in Park City, Utah to Robert and Mary Farrer. Her grandparents were immigrants from Denmark. Her father worked as an electrical engineer for American Smelting & Refining Co., and her mother held volunteer positions in the Church of Jesus Christ of Latter-day Saints while working in the home caring for Virginia and her six siblings. The family ran a produce and livestock farm in the Salt Lake Valley. Cutler grew up in Murray, Utah and worked at the Murray Millinery Shop as a seamstress. She used the money she earned to take piano lessons from Frank W. Asper at the Gardo House. She was a member of The Church of Jesus Christ of Latter-day Saints. Cutler graduated from Murray High School in 1922, having been actively involved as president of the economics club and vice president of her senior class. As a high school student, Cutler entered a local apron design competition as a spur-of-the-moment decision and won. She was awarded a four-year scholarship—worth $100 at the time—to the University of Utah.

During her time at the University of Utah, Cutler participated in the school's home economics club. She graduated in 1927 with a degree in education. She was a first-generation college graduate. Cutler then moved to Manti, Utah to work as a home economics teacher. Next, she taught at Draper Junior High School and Jordan High School. While serving as a local leader of the Mutual Improvement Association in the late 1920s, Cutler met her husband, Ralph Garr Cutler, at a stake board meeting. The two received the same assignment to travel to Taylorsville, Utah. They became engaged two weeks after their first meeting. They were married in the Salt Lake Temple on July 10, 1929. On April 23, 1930, Cutler gave birth to their first child, Robert Garr Cutler. The family lived in a house they'd built on the Cutler family farm in Salt Lake County, where Ralph Cutler tended to the land. Then, in 1931, just two years after their marriage, he died suddenly of sepsis. Newly widowed, Virginia Cutler returned to work just two weeks after her husband's abrupt death. She secured a teaching job to support her young son; however, when it became obvious that she was pregnant, Cutler lost that position. Luckily, she was soon offered another. She gave birth to her second son, Ralph Garr Cutler, on July 27, 1932, naming him after his father. Cutler resumed teaching at a school in Taylorsville after Ralph's birth. Around this time, she realized that she wanted to pursue higher education and earn more money so that her sons would have greater opportunities when they came of age.

== Education ==
=== Attending Stanford and Cornell ===
In 1935, Virginia Cutler and her two young sons moved to California. She enrolled in a "counseling" program at Stanford University that would enable her to become a university administrator. She received the Henry Newell Scholarship to attend Stanford, and also worked in the Dean of Women's Office to support herself and her family. Despite obstacles—including both of her children catching pneumonia and her having to spend several weeks in the hospital with a broken back due to a car accident—Cutler completed her master's degree at Stanford in 1937. She and her family then remained in California for the next eight years. Cutler first worked as a teacher in Durham, California before moving to Colusa, where she worked for the University of California Extension Service as a home demonstration agent. This position paid her double the salary of her previous teaching job. She was selected as president of the Home Economics Association of California during this time.

In 1944, again with the hope that further education would provide her children with more opportunities, Cutler moved to Ithaca, New York to enroll in a doctoral program at Cornell University. She chose the institution because it was known for having the best home economics program in the country. During her two years at Cornell, Cutler conducted a study of fifty families from the Ithaca area, and her findings were published by the university. Cornell also distributed pamphlets with a list of the important attributes of a successful home, developed by Cutler. She worked as a research assistant while working towards her doctorate. Cutler also studied at the Vassar Institute of Euthenics. She graduated from Cornell with her PhD in 1946.

== University administration ==
=== Head of the Home Economics Department at the University of Utah ===
While living in New York, Cutler received a phone call from A. Ray Olpin, then president of the University of Utah, offering her a job as the head of university's Home Economics Department. After graduating from Cornell in the summer of 1946, Cutler assumed this position. She worked at the university for the next 8 years, during which time she developed a unique "home values test" to help families measure exactly what they wished to improve within their home. She also played an important role in establishing the Sterling Sill Home Living Center, a place where young women could receive hands-on training on how to establish a successful home. Supervisors at the center would help the women learn how to plan menus and maintain a budget. Cutler herself was a supervisor for a year. She also addressed the Credit Bureau of Salt Lake City in 1947 on the subject of establishing family budgets, encouraging "tailoring budgets to suit the needs of each family member". Her other accomplishments while at the University of Utah include raising funds for the National Home Economics Association's new D.C. headquarters, speaking as a guest lecturer, and organizing an annual "Career Days" event for high-school age women. One of Cutler's main goals as head of the university's Home Economics Department was to assist and encourage young women in receiving higher education. She stated: "Every young woman needs two careers: One in the home, and one where she can earn a satisfactory living outside the home." Cutler also worked as a visiting professor at the University of Washington during this time.

=== Dean of the College of Family Living at Brigham Young University ===
When Ernest L. Wilkinson first visited Dr. Virginia Cutler in her office at the University of Utah to offer her the position of head of Brigham Young University's (BYU's) Home Economics Department, she told him she wasn't interested. Cutler enjoyed the work she was currently doing, and felt that BYU was too small to fit her goals. Regardless, Wilkinson persisted. He involved Cutler in multiple projects, including the design and construction of seventeen residence halls for female students. A conflict of sorts arose between Wilkinson and the staff at the University of Utah over Cutler, so she decided to spend the summer abroad in Thailand instead of working at either university. She returned to Utah in 1961 and began work as Dean of the College of Family Living at BYU. She changed the name of the institution from the College of Home Economics to the College of Family Living; she thought that the term "family" ought to be emphasized. While serving as dean, Dr. Cutler held regular breakfasts in her office so that she could meet and get to know some of the students in the college. She also represented the United States at the 1962 World Forum on Women, held in Brussels, Belgium. She served as dean until 1972.

== International and civil work ==
=== Southeast Asia ===
Before becoming Dean of the College of Family Living, Cutler was invited to attend a conference held at Columbia University in 1954 that introduced a program to establish home economics education abroad. It was called the "Point Four Program." This initiative stemmed from the Marshall Plan, a policy adopted by the US government that encouraged citizens to provide aid to foreign nations. Dr. Cutler was invited to be a technical advisor in home economics education for the International Cooperation Administration, a US organization that sent American professionals abroad to 58 countries to assist in education, public health, and other areas. The motivation behind this program, according to a University of Utah student newspaper, was "to aid in educating the people against Communist infiltration by cultural and social advancement." The United States Department of State sponsored Cutler's trip to Southeast Asia. She was given the option to go to either Israel or Thailand, and ended up choosing the latter, though she didn't know much at all about the country. She spent time before her trip studying Thai culture. Once she arrived, her main task was to establish a home economics department at Phulalongkorn University in Bangkok. Cutler also developed a teacher training college for women—an institution that had previously been a training school for the king's daughters. She helped the teachers focus on classroom skills and providing instruction that would benefit the people in general, not just the Thai royals. Dr. Cutler traveled throughout Thailand during her time there, providing training to teachers in her capacity as education advisor. She also worked as an economic consultant. Additionally, Dr. Cutler sent students out into different parts of the nation to administer surveys that would identify the country's needs to be met. Cutler decided to focus her efforts on lowering infant mortality rates. She reported her progress to the United States Foreign Operations Administration, and helped establish a National Home Economics Program for Thailand. Dr. Cutler also worked to improve the people's nutrition. She left Thailand in 1956, after a stay of two years.

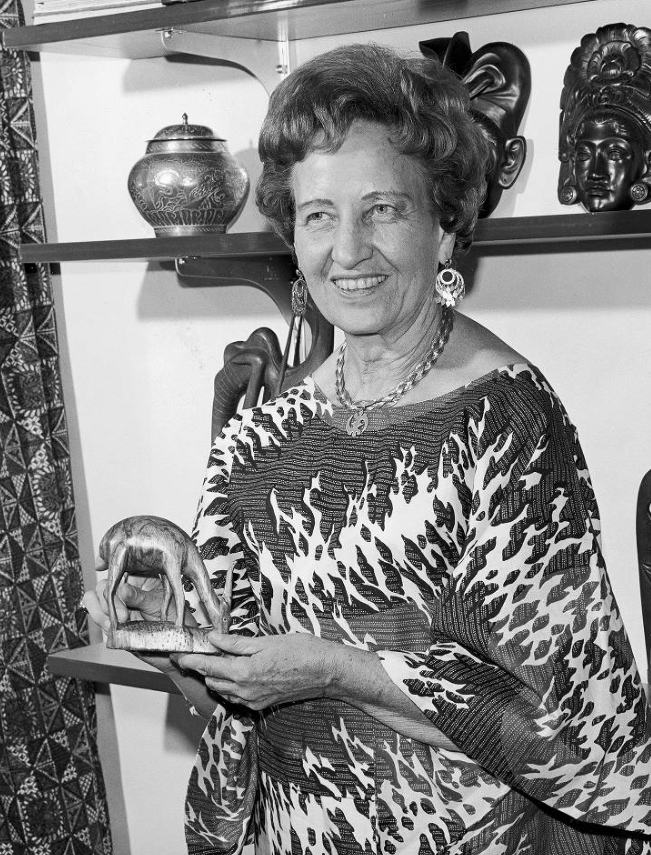
Dr. Virginia Cutler with her Ghanaian dress, jewelry, and artifacts

Virginia Cutler was then assigned to Jakarta, Indonesia. She stayed in that country for five years, teaching home management, setting up new schools, and working (as the only American representative) with the home economics division of the Indonesian Ministry of Education. Dr. Cutler worked in a dozen teacher training colleges across the archipelago. She also established a "standard pattern project" in Indonesia for sewing clothes. She then visited Cambodia, South Vietnam, and multiple islands in the South Pacific before returning home to the United States. She spent a total of seven years in Asia.

=== Africa ===
At the request of Cornell University, Cutler took a three-year leave of absence from BYU in 1966 to establish a degree course in home science at the University of Ghana. She lived in Ghana for the first year as a Fulbright scholar, then elected to stay for two more. UNICEF financially supported her work. She established the university's Department of Home Science, spearheading the building of offices, classrooms, labs, and a child study center—all within the first year of the department's creation. She spent much of her time recruiting students to the home economics program; only eight signed up during the first year of operation. Dr. Cutler established a scholarship fund for students in the department and played a direct role in the construction of a classroom building that doubled as student housing.

== Later years ==
At the request of Ernest Wilkinson, Dr. Cutler returned to Brigham Young University in 1969 to head the Family Economics and Home Management Department. She focused her efforts on recruiting American Indian students to her program and improving their experience at BYU. After Cutler's return to BYU, her older son, Robert, died abruptly of appendicitis. Cutler helped support his widow, Beverly Cutler, and their five children. She even assisted Beverly in attending BYU and Stanford. She retired in 1971 as a professor emeritus. In retirement, Cutler served as president of the Association of Utah Women and the League of Utah Consumers. She was also president of the Utah chapter of the American Association of University Women. She first became involved with the association at BYU, but when she later was appointed president, she gained the added responsibility of traveling to various local chapters throughout the state. "I went to all of them," she said, "and at every one I gave a rip-roaring speech about how important it is for women to have an opportunity and to get all the education they could." She also served on the association's general board for 15 years. Cutler's experiences with workplace discrimination—namely, being paid less than her male colleagues—led her to support the Equal Rights Amendment. In her capacity as president of the Utah chapter of the Association of University Women, she delivered speeches throughout Utah and conducted interviews with reporters, often on the subject of women's rights. For example, on December 1, 1977, she addressed a gathering of people at Southern Utah State College on the topic of women in Utah history. She was also a member of the White House Consumer Committee under President Richard Nixon from 1972 until 1975. She was on the Young Women's General Board (the governing committee of a youth organization in the Church of Jesus Christ of Latter-day Saints) as well. She lived in Salt Lake City with her sister Fern during the later years of her life. In 1971, alongside Gordon B. Hinckley and Lowell L. Bennion, Dr. Cutler received the Distinguished Alumnus Award from the University of Utah Alumni Association. In 1976, Dr. Cutler was named one of the 10 Most Outstanding Women of Utah.

Cutler was also chairman of the Major Appliance Consumer Action Panel (MACAP), a group of six experts she established to assist Major Appliance Industry, a company in Chicago, Illinois, in meeting consumer needs and addressing consumer concerns. The panel consulted over 200 US appliance manufacturers. Other industries, including furniture and automobile manufacturing, followed suit and established these consumer action panels as well. In 1975, she left her position as chairman after five years of service.

== Death and legacy ==
Cutler used the money she earned from her job with Major Appliance to establish scholarship funds at her alma maters: Cornell University, Stanford University, and the University of Utah. She also funded three scholarships at Utah State University and a few at BYU. Cutler established a total of twenty scholarship funds at eight institutions of higher learning. In 1977, she had two sons, eight grandchildren, and two great-grandchildren. By the time she died, Cutler had achieved her goal to perform 2,500 endowments.

Cutler died of Alzheimer's disease on May 20, 1993 in Eugene, Oregon. She has been called "one of the Church's leading representatives for international development". Cutler has been awarded the Joseph F. Smith Family Living Award, the Abraham Smoot Public Service Award, and distinguished service awards from both the University of Utah and Cornell University. She was the first "distinguished professor" at BYU. Cutler was also named the American Association of University Women's Woman of the Year in 1966 and the Utah Mother of the year in 1972. An annual lecture series held at Brigham Young University is named for her.
