= Assistant to the Quorum of the Twelve Apostles =

Priesthood calling in the LDS Church

Assistant to the Quorum of the Twelve Apostles, commonly shortened to Assistant to the Twelve or Assistant to the Twelve Apostles, was a priesthood calling in the Church of Jesus Christ of Latter-day Saints from 1941 to 1976. As the title suggests, men who held this position assisted the Quorum of the Twelve Apostles in fulfilling their priesthood responsibilities. Assistants to the Twelve were general authorities and were generally assigned by the Twelve Apostles to preside over and speak at stake conferences; re-organize stakes; tour missions; and assist in the direction of worldwide missionary work. Like counselors in the First Presidency, the calling of Assistant to the Twelve was not a distinct priesthood office—rather, it was a calling that any worthy high priest could be asked to fill.

In April 1941, church president Heber J. Grant called five men to serve as Assistants to the Twelve. No additional Assistants to the Twelve were called until 1951. The church continued to call Assistants to the Twelve throughout the 1950s, 1960s, and the first half of the 1970s.

Of the 38 men who held the calling of Assistant to the Twelve, 13 later became members of the Quorum of the Twelve Apostles: Marion G. Romney, George Q. Morris, Hugh B. Brown, Gordon B. Hinckley, N. Eldon Tanner, Boyd K. Packer, Marvin J. Ashton, L. Tom Perry, David B. Haight, James E. Faust, Neal A. Maxwell, Robert D. Hales, and Joseph B. Wirthlin. Additionally, a former Assistant to the Twelve, Alvin R. Dyer, was ordained to the office of apostle without being made a member of the Quorum of the Twelve. Seven Assistants to the Twelve (Romney, Brown, Dyer, Isaacson, Hinckley, Tanner, and Faust) later served in the church's First Presidency, with one (Hinckley) later becoming the church's president.

In 1976, church president Spencer W. Kimball announced that the calling of Assistant to the Twelve would be discontinued. The 22 men then serving in that calling were ordained to the priesthood office of seventy and assigned to the First Quorum of the Seventy, which had been organized in 1975. The following people held the calling of Assistant to Twelve:

Name:	Marion G. Romney
Born:	September 19, 1897
Died:	May 20, 1988 (aged 90)
Positions:	President of the Quorum of the Twelve Apostles (with Howard W. Hunter as Acting President), November 10, 1985 – May 20, 1988; Quorum of the Twelve Apostles, November 5, 1985 – May 20, 1988; First Counselor in the First Presidency, called by Spencer W. Kimball, December 2, 1982 – November 5, 1985; Second Counselor in the First Presidency, called by Harold B. Lee, July 7, 1972 – December 2, 1982; Quorum of the Twelve Apostles, called by David O. McKay, October 4, 1951 – July 7, 1972; LDS Church Apostle, called by David O. McKay, October 11, 1951 – May 20, 1988; Assistant to the Quorum of the Twelve Apostles, called by Heber J. Grant, April 6, 1941 – October 4, 1951
Notes:	Parents were American. One of the first five people selected as Assistants to the Quorum of the Twelve Apostles in 1941.
Name:	Thomas E. McKay
Born:	October 29, 1875
Died:	January 15, 1958 (aged 82)
Positions:	Assistant to the Quorum of the Twelve Apostles, called by Heber J. Grant, April 6, 1941 – January 15, 1958
Notes:	One of the first five people selected as Assistants to the Quorum of the Twelve Apostles.
Name:	Clifford E. Young
Born:	December 7, 1883
Died:	August 21, 1958 (aged 74)
Positions:	Assistant to the Quorum of the Twelve Apostles, called by Heber J. Grant, April 6, 1941 – August 21, 1958
Notes:	One of the first five people selected as Assistants to the Quorum of the Twelve Apostles.
Name:	Alma Sonne
Born:	March 5, 1884
Died:	November 27, 1977 (aged 93)
Positions:	First Quorum of the Seventy, called by Spencer W. Kimball, October 1, 1976 – November 27, 1977; Assistant to the Quorum of the Twelve Apostles, called by Heber J. Grant, April 6, 1941 – October 1, 1976
Notes:	One of the first five people selected as Assistants to the Quorum of the Twelve Apostles.
Name:	Nicholas G. Smith
Born:	June 20, 1881
Died:	October 27, 1945 (aged 64)
Positions:	Acting Presiding Patriarch (de facto), called by Heber J. Grant, February 4, 1932 – 1934; Assistant to the Quorum of the Twelve Apostles, called by Heber J. Grant, April 6, 1941 – October 27, 1945
Notes:	One of the first five people selected as Assistants to the Quorum of the Twelve Apostles.
Name:	George Q. Morris
Born:	February 20, 1874
Died:	April 23, 1962 (aged 88)
Positions:	Quorum of the Twelve Apostles, called by David O. McKay, April 8, 1954 – April 23, 1962; LDS Church Apostle, called by David O. McKay, April 8, 1954 – April 23, 1962; Assistant to the Quorum of the Twelve Apostles, called by David O. McKay, October 6, 1951 – April 8, 1954
Notes:	Grandson of George Q. Cannon.
Name:	Stayner Richards
Born:	December 20, 1885
Died:	May 28, 1953 (aged 67)
Positions:	Assistant to the Quorum of the Twelve Apostles, called by David O. McKay, October 6, 1951 – May 28, 1953
Notes:	Brother of Stephen L Richards and grandson of Willard Richards.
Name:	ElRay L. Christiansen
Born:	July 13, 1897
Died:	December 2, 1975 (aged 78)
Positions:	Assistant to the Quorum of the Twelve Apostles, called by David O. McKay, October 6, 1951 – December 2, 1975
Notes:	Played with the Utah Symphony Orchestra.
Name:	John Longden
Born:	4 November 1898
Died:	30 August 1969 (aged 70)
Positions:	Assistant to the Quorum of the Twelve Apostles, called by David O. McKay, 6 October 1951 – 30 August 1969
Name:	Hugh B. Brown
Born:	October 24, 1883
Died:	December 2, 1975 (aged 92)
Positions:	Quorum of the Twelve Apostles, January 18, 1970 – December 2, 1975; First Counselor in the First Presidency, called by David O. McKay, October 4, 1963 – January 18, 1970; Second Counselor in the First Presidency, called by David O. McKay, October 12, 1961 – October 4, 1963; Third Counselor in the First Presidency, called by David O. McKay, June 22, 1961 – October 12, 1961; Quorum of the Twelve Apostles, called by David O. McKay, April 10, 1958 – June 22, 1961; Apostle, called by David O. McKay, April 10, 1958 – December 2, 1975; Assistant to the Quorum of the Twelve Apostles, called by David O. McKay, October 4, 1953 – April 10, 1958
Notes:	Also worked as a professor of religion at Brigham Young University from 1946 to 1949.
Name:	Sterling W. Sill
Born:	March 31, 1903
Died:	May 25, 1994 (aged 91)
Positions:	Emeritus General Authority, called by Spencer W. Kimball, December 31, 1978 – May 25, 1994; First Quorum of the Seventy, called by Spencer W. Kimball, October 1, 1976 – December 31, 1978; Assistant to the Quorum of the Twelve Apostles, called by David O. McKay, April 6, 1954 – October 1, 1976
Name:	Gordon B. Hinckley
Born:	June 23, 1910
Died:	January 27, 2008 (aged 97)
Positions:	15th President of the Church of Jesus Christ of Latter-day Saints, March 12, 1995 – January 27, 2008; President of the Quorum of the Twelve Apostles (with Boyd K. Packer as Acting President), June 5, 1994 – March 12, 1995; First Counselor in the First Presidency, called by Howard W. Hunter, June 5, 1994 – March 3, 1995; First Counselor in the First Presidency, called by Ezra Taft Benson, November 10, 1985 – June 5, 1994; Second Counselor in the First Presidency, called by Spencer W. Kimball, December 2, 1982 – November 5, 1985; Counselor in the First Presidency, called by Spencer W. Kimball, July 23, 1981 – December 2, 1982; Quorum of the Twelve Apostles, called by David O. McKay, October 5, 1961 – July 23, 1981; LDS Church Apostle, called by David O. McKay, October 5, 1961 – January 27, 2008; Assistant to the Quorum of the Twelve Apostles, called by David O. McKay, April 6, 1958 – October 5, 1961
Notes:	Nephew of Alonzo A. Hinckley.
Name:	Henry D. Taylor
Born:	November 22, 1903
Died:	February 24, 1987 (aged 83)
Positions:	Emeritus General Authority, called by Spencer W. Kimball, September 30, 1978 – February 24, 1987; First Quorum of the Seventy, called by Spencer W. Kimball, October 1, 1976 – September 30, 1978; Assistant to the Quorum of the Twelve Apostles, called by David O. McKay, April 6, 1958 – October 1, 1976
Name:	William J. Critchlow Jr.
Born:	August 21, 1892
Died:	August 30, 1968 (aged 76)
Positions:	Assistant to the Quorum of the Twelve Apostles, called by David O. McKay, October 11, 1958 – August 30, 1968
Name:	Alvin R. Dyer
Born:	January 1, 1903
Died:	March 6, 1977 (aged 74)
Positions:	First Quorum of the Seventy, called by Spencer W. Kimball, October 1, 1976 – March 6, 1977; Assistant to the Quorum of the Twelve Apostles, called by Joseph Fielding Smith, January 18, 1970 – October 1, 1976; Counselor in the First Presidency, called by David O. McKay, April 6, 1968 – January 18, 1970; LDS Church Apostle, called by David O. McKay, October 5, 1967 – March 6, 1977; Assistant to the Quorum of the Twelve Apostles, called by David O. McKay, October 11, 1958 – October 5, 1967
Name:	N. Eldon Tanner
Born:	May 9, 1898
Died:	November 27, 1982 (aged 84)
Positions:	First Counselor in the First Presidency, called by Spencer W. Kimball, December 30, 1973 – November 27, 1982; First Counselor in the First Presidency, called by Harold B. Lee, July 7, 1972 – December 26, 1973; Second Counselor in the First Presidency, called by Joseph Fielding Smith, January 23, 1970 – July 2, 1972; Second Counselor in the First Presidency, called by David O. McKay, October 4, 1963 – January 18, 1970; Quorum of the Twelve Apostles, called by David O. McKay, October 11, 1962 – October 4, 1963; LDS Church Apostle, called by David O. McKay, October 11, 1962 – November 27, 1982; Assistant to the Quorum of the Twelve Apostles, called by David O. McKay, October 8, 1960 – October 11, 1962
Notes:	Member (1935–52) of and Speaker (1936–37) of the Legislative Assembly of Alberta.
Name:	Franklin D. Richards
Born:	November 17, 1900
Died:	November 13, 1987 (aged 86)
Positions:	First Quorum of the Seventy, called by Spencer W. Kimball, October 1, 1976 – November 13, 1987; Presidency of the First Quorum of the Seventy, called by Spencer W. Kimball, October 1, 1976 – October 1, 1983; Assistant to the Quorum of the Twelve Apostles, called by David O. McKay, October 8, 1960 – October 1, 1976
Notes:	Grandson of Franklin D. Richards. Was a national commissioner of the United States Federal Housing Administration
Name:	Theodore M. Burton
Born:	March 27, 1907
Died:	December 22, 1989 (aged 82)
Positions:	Emeritus General Authority, called by Ezra Taft Benson, September 30, 1989 – December 22, 1989; First Quorum of the Seventy, called by Spencer W. Kimball, October 1, 1976 – September 30, 1989; Assistant to the Quorum of the Twelve Apostles, called by David O. McKay, October 8, 1960 – October 1, 1976
Notes:	Also worked for the treasury attache at the U.S. embassies in both Vienna and Berlin.
Name:	Thorpe B. Isaacson
Born:	September 6, 1898
Died:	November 9, 1970 (aged 72)
Positions:	Assistant to the Quorum of the Twelve Apostles, called by Joseph Fielding Smith, January 23, 1970 – November 9, 1970; Counselor in the First Presidency, called by David O. McKay, October 28, 1965 – January 18, 1970; Assistant to the Quorum of the Twelve Apostles, called by David O. McKay, September 30, 1961 – October 28, 1965; First Counselor in the Presiding Bishopric, called by Joseph L. Wirthlin, April 6, 1952 – September 30, 1961; Second Counselor in the Presiding Bishopric, called by LeGrand Richards, December 12, 1946 – April 6, 1952
Name:	Boyd K. Packer
Born:	September 10, 1924
Died:	July 3, 2015 (aged 90)
Positions:	President of the Quorum of the Twelve Apostles, February 3, 2008 – July 3, 2015; Acting President of the Quorum of the Twelve Apostles, June 5, 1994 – January 27, 2008; Quorum of the Twelve Apostles, called by Joseph Fielding Smith, April 6, 1970 – July 3, 2015; LDS Church Apostle, called by Joseph Fielding Smith, April 9, 1970 – July 3, 2015; Assistant to the Quorum of the Twelve Apostles, called by David O. McKay, September 30, 1961 – April 6, 1970
Name:	Bernard P. Brockbank, Sr.
Born:	May 9, 1909
Died:	October 11, 2000 (aged 91)
Positions:	Emeritus General Authority, called by Spencer W. Kimball, October 4, 1980 – October 11, 2000; First Quorum of the Seventy, called by Spencer W. Kimball, October 1, 1976 – October 4, 1980; Assistant to the Quorum of the Twelve Apostles, called by David O. McKay, October 6, 1962 – October 1, 1976
Name:	James A. Cullimore
Born:	January 17, 1906
Died:	June 14, 1986 (aged 80)
Positions:	Emeritus General Authority, called by Spencer W. Kimball, September 30, 1978 – June 14, 1986; First Quorum of the Seventy, called by Spencer W. Kimball, October 1, 1976 – September 30, 1978; Assistant to the Quorum of the Twelve Apostles, called by David O. McKay, April 6, 1966 – October 1, 1976
Name:	Marion D. Hanks
Born:	October 21, 1921
Died:	August 5, 2011 (aged 89)
Positions:	Emeritus General Authority, called by Ezra Taft Benson, October 3, 1992 – August 5, 2011; Presidency of the Seventy, called by Spencer W. Kimball, October 6, 1984 – August 15, 1992; Presidency of the First Quorum of the Seventy, called by Spencer W. Kimball, October 1, 1976 – April 5, 1980; First Quorum of the Seventy, called by Spencer W. Kimball, October 1, 1976 – October 3, 1992; Assistant to the Quorum of the Twelve Apostles, called by David O. McKay, April 6, 1968 – October 1, 1976; First Council of the Seventy, called by David O. McKay, October 4, 1953 – April 6, 1968
Notes:	Member of the President's Council on Physical Fitness and Sports and Citizens Advisory Committee on Children and Youth
Name:	Marvin J. Ashton
Born:	May 6, 1915
Died:	February 25, 1994 (aged 78)
Positions:	Quorum of the Twelve Apostles, called by Joseph Fielding Smith, December 2, 1971 – February 25, 1994; LDS Church Apostle, called by Joseph Fielding Smith, December 2, 1971 – February 25, 1994; Assistant to the Quorum of the Twelve Apostles, called by David O. McKay, October 3, 1969 – December 2, 1971
Name:	Joseph Anderson
Born:	November 20, 1889
Died:	March 23, 1992 (aged 102)
Positions:	Emeritus General Authority, called by Spencer W. Kimball, December 31, 1978 – March 13, 1992; First Quorum of the Seventy, called by Spencer W. Kimball, October 1, 1976 – December 31, 1978; Assistant to the Quorum of the Twelve Apostles, called by Joseph Fielding Smith, April 6, 1970 – October 1, 1976
Notes:	Was secretary to the First Presidency 1922 – April 6, 1970
Name:	David B. Haight
Born:	September 2, 1906
Died:	July 31, 2004 (aged 97)
Positions:	Quorum of the Twelve Apostles, called by Spencer W. Kimball, January 8, 1976 – July 31, 2004; LDS Church Apostle, called by Spencer W. Kimball, January 8, 1976 – July 31, 2004; Assistant to the Quorum of the Twelve Apostles, called by Joseph Fielding Smith, April 6, 1970 – January 8, 1976
Name:	William H. Bennett
Born:	5 November 1910
Died:	23 July 1980 (aged 69)
Positions:	Emeritus General Authority, called by Spencer W. Kimball, December 31, 1978 – July 23, 1980; First Quorum of the Seventy, called by Spencer W. Kimball, October 1, 1976 – December 31, 1978; Assistant to the Quorum of the Twelve Apostles, called by Joseph Fielding Smith, April 6, 1970 – October 1, 1976
Name:	John H. Vandenberg
Born:	November 18, 1904
Died:	June 3, 1992 (aged 87)
Positions:	Emeritus General Authority, called by Spencer W. Kimball, September 30, 1978 – June 3, 1992; First Quorum of the Seventy, called by Spencer W. Kimball, October 1, 1976 – September 30, 1978; Assistant to the Quorum of the Twelve Apostles, called by Joseph Fielding Smith, April 6, 1972 – October 1, 1976; Presiding Bishop, called by David O. McKay, September 30, 1961 – April 6, 1972
Name:	Robert L. Simpson
Born:	August 8, 1915
Died:	April 15, 2003 (aged 87)
Positions:	Emeritus General Authority, called by Ezra Taft Benson, September 30, 1989 – April 15, 2003; First Quorum of the Seventy, called by Spencer W. Kimball, October 1, 1976 – September 30, 1989; Assistant to the Quorum of the Twelve Apostles, called by Joseph Fielding Smith, April 6, 1972 – October 1, 1976; First Counselor in the Presiding Bishopric, called by John H. Vandenburg, September 30, 1961 – April 6, 1972
Name:	O. Leslie Stone
Born:	May 28, 1903
Died:	April 26, 1986 (aged 82)
Positions:	Emeritus General Authority, called by Spencer W. Kimball, October 4, 1980 – April 26, 1986; First Quorum of the Seventy, called by Spencer W. Kimball, October 1, 1976 – October 4, 1980; Assistant to the Quorum of the Twelve Apostles, called by Harold B. Lee, October 6, 1972 – October 1, 1976
Name:	James E. Faust
Born:	July 31, 1920
Died:	August 10, 2007 (aged 87)
Positions:	Second Counselor in the First Presidency, called by Gordon B. Hinckley, March 12, 1995 – August 10, 2007; Quorum of the Twelve Apostles, called by Spencer W. Kimball, September 30, 1978 – March 12, 1995; LDS Church Apostle, called by Spencer W. Kimball, October 1, 1978 – August 10, 2007; Presidency of the First Quorum of the Seventy, called by Spencer W. Kimball, October 1, 1976 – September 30, 1978; First Quorum of the Seventy, called by Spencer W. Kimball, October 1, 1976 – September 30, 1978; Assistant to the Quorum of the Twelve Apostles, called by Harold B. Lee, October 6, 1972 – October 1, 1976
Name:	L. Tom Perry
Born:	August 5, 1922
Died:	May 30, 2015 (aged 92)
Positions:	Quorum of the Twelve Apostles, called by Spencer W. Kimball, April 6, 1974 – May 30, 2015; Apostle, called by Spencer W. Kimball, April 11, 1974 – May 30, 2015; Assistant to the Quorum of the Twelve Apostles, called by Harold B. Lee, October 6, 1972 – April 6, 1974
Name:	J. Thomas Fyans
Born:	May 17, 1918
Died:	May 18, 2008 (aged 90)
Positions:	Emeritus General Authority, called by Ezra Taft Benson, September 30, 1989 – May 18, 2008; First Quorum of the Seventy, called by Spencer W. Kimball, October 1, 1976 – September 30, 1989; Presidency of the First Quorum of the Seventy, called by Spencer W. Kimball, October 1, 1976 – October 6, 1985; Assistant to the Quorum of the Twelve Apostles, called by Spencer W. Kimball, April 6, 1974 – October 1, 1976
Name:	Neal A. Maxwell
Born:	July 6, 1926
Died:	July 21, 2004 (aged 78)
Positions:	Quorum of the Twelve Apostles, called by Spencer W. Kimball, July 23, 1981 – July 21, 2004; LDS Church Apostle, called by Spencer W. Kimball, July 23, 1981 – July 21, 2004; Presidency of the First Quorum of the Seventy, called by Spencer W. Kimball, October 1, 1976 – July 23, 1981; First Quorum of the Seventy, called by Spencer W. Kimball, October 1, 1976 – July 23, 1981; Assistant to the Quorum of the Twelve Apostles, called by Spencer W. Kimball, April 6, 1974 – October 1, 1976
Name:	Wm. Grant Bangerter
Born:	June 8, 1918
Died:	April 18, 2010 (aged 91)
Positions:	Emeritus General Authority, September 30, 1989 – April 18, 2010; Presidency of the First Quorum of the Seventy, called by Ezra Taft Benson, February 17, 1985 – September 30, 1989; Presidency of the First Quorum of the Seventy, called by Spencer W. Kimball, September 30, 1978 – April 5, 1980; First Quorum of the Seventy, called by Spencer W. Kimball, October 1, 1976 – September 30, 1989; Assistant to the Quorum of the Twelve Apostles, called by Spencer W. Kimball, April 4, 1975 – October 1, 1976
Notes:	Elder brother of former Utah governor Norman H. Bangerter.
Name:	Robert D. Hales
Born:	August 24, 1932
Died:	October 1, 2017 (aged 85)
Positions:	Quorum of the Twelve Apostles, called by Ezra Taft Benson, April 2, 1994 – October 1, 2017; LDS Church Apostle, called by Ezra Taft Benson, April 7, 1994 – October 1, 2017; Presiding Bishop, called by Spencer W. Kimball, April 6, 1985 – April 2, 1994; First Quorum of the Seventy, called by Spencer W. Kimball, October 1, 1976 – April 6, 1985; Assistant to the Quorum of the Twelve Apostles, called by Spencer W. Kimball, April 4, 1975 – October 1, 1976
Name:	Adney Y. Komatsu
Born:	August 2, 1923
Died:	February 23, 2011 (aged 87)
Positions:	Emeritus General Authority, called by Ezra Taft Benson, October 2, 1993 – February 23, 2011; First Quorum of the Seventy, called by Spencer W. Kimball, October 1, 1976 – October 2, 1993; Assistant to the Quorum of the Twelve Apostles, called by Spencer W. Kimball, April 4, 1975 – October 1, 1976
Name:	Joseph B. Wirthlin
Born:	June 11, 1917
Died:	December 1, 2008 (aged 91)
Positions:	Quorum of the Twelve Apostles, called by Ezra Taft Benson, October 4, 1986 – December 1, 2008; LDS Church Apostle, called by Ezra Taft Benson, October 9, 1986 – December 1, 2008; Presidency of the First Quorum of the Seventy, called by Ezra Taft Benson, August 28, 1986 – October 4, 1986; First Quorum of the Seventy, called by Spencer W. Kimball, October 1, 1976 – October 4, 1986; Assistant to the Quorum of the Twelve Apostles, called by Spencer W. Kimball, April 4, 1975 – October 1, 1976

== See also ==
- Regional representative of the Twelve
