= William H. Bennett (Mormon) =

Canadian Mormon leader

Emeritus General Authority
- December 31, 1978 – July 23, 1980

First Quorum of the Seventy
- October 1, 1976 – December 31, 1978
- End reason: Granted general authority emeritus status

Assistant to the Quorum of the Twelve Apostles
- April 6, 1970 – October 1, 1976
- End reason: Position abolished

Personal details
- Born: William Hunter Bennett; 5 November 1910; Taber, Alberta, Canada
- Died: 23 July 1980 (aged 69); Bountiful, Utah, United States

William Hunter Bennett (5 November 1910 – 23 July 1980) was a general authority of the Church of Jesus Christ of Latter-day Saints (LDS Church) from 1970 until his death.

Bennett was born in Taber, Alberta, Canada. He attended the School of Agriculture in Raymond, Alberta, and earned bachelor's and master's degrees in agriculture from Utah State University (USU) in the US, followed by a Ph.D. in agriculture from the University of Wisconsin–Madison. He joined the faculty of USU as a professor of agronomy.

Bennett married Patricia June Christensen; they had six children.

Bennett was an avid sportsman and in 1936 tried out for the Canadian Summer Olympics team in the shot put and discus throw.

In 1970, while serving in the LDS Church as a regional representative, Bennett was called as an Assistant to the Quorum of the Twelve Apostles and a general authority of the church. Bennett served in this position until 1976, when the position of Assistant to the Twelve was abolished and he became a member of the First Quorum of the Seventy, until 1978, when he was designated as an emeritus general authority.

While an assistant, Bennett was assigned to deal with work in Africa, and was involved in an ordeal in which missionaries were confused as to whether they were to baptize a number of black South Africans who wished to join the Church, despite the restrictions on blacks in holding the priesthood at that time. Bennett and other officials approved baptisal, but the missionaries had concerns that such a move would anger the South African government, which they believed had reached a tacit agreement with the Church in the past stipulating that Mormon missionaries could preach in the country provided that they did not proselytize black South Africans. The missionaries were also worried about the complications involved in intermingling blacks with the white believers, as the blacks, lacking priesthood authority, would not be able to assist with things such as home teaching. They also pointed out that the whites needed government permits to enter black areas. After consulting with Marion G. Romney, Bennet wrote back to a missionary saying "It appears that we have received direction from the Brethren that this is not the time for us to move ahead with a program for baptizing the Bantus in South Africa." This policy stood in place until the 1978 Revelation opened the priesthood to men of all races.

Bennett died at his home in Bountiful, Utah, US.
