= Alma Sonne =

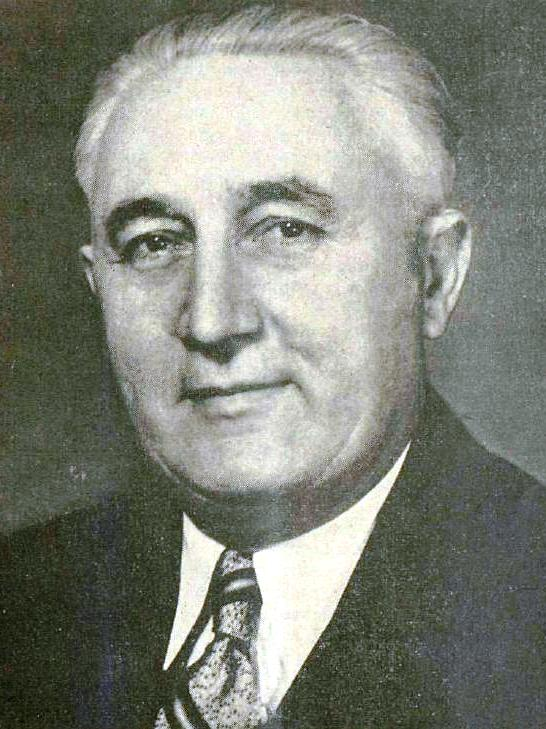

Assistant to the Quorum of the Twelve Apostles
- April 6, 1941 – October 1, 1976
- End reason: Position abolished

First Quorum of the Seventy
- October 1, 1976 – November 27, 1977

Personal details
- Born: Alma Sonne; March 5, 1884; Logan, Utah Territory, United States
- Died: November 27, 1977 (aged 93); Logan, Utah, United States
- Resting place: Logan City Cemetery; 41°44′57.12″N 111°48′21.96″W
- Spouse(s): Geneva Ballantyne (1912-1941); Leona Ballantyne (1943-1971)
- Children: 5

Alma Sonne (March 5, 1884 – November 27, 1977) was a general authority of the Church of Jesus Christ of Latter-day Saints (LDS Church) from 1941 until his death.

Sonne was born in Logan, Utah Territory. He graduated from Brigham Young College in Logan and entered the banking business. From 1910 to 1912, Sonne was a missionary for the LDS Church in England. He and seven other missionaries purchased tickets to travel back to America on the RMS Titanic, but due to a situation with one of the missionaries, Sonne canceled all eight tickets.

Sonne eventually became the president of the Cache Stake of the church. He worked as a banker.

In 1941, Sonne became one of the first five individuals to hold the calling of Assistant to the Quorum of the Twelve Apostles in the LDS Church. Sonne was the president of the European Mission of the church from 1946 to 1950. Sonne was an Assistant to the Twelve until 1976, when the position was abolished. At this time, he was transferred to the newly created First Quorum of the Seventy.

Sonne died in Logan, Utah. He was the father of Conway Sonne.
