= O. Leslie Stone =

Emeritus General Authority
- October 4, 1980 – April 26, 1986

First Quorum of the Seventy
- October 1, 1976 – October 4, 1980
- End reason: Granted general authority emeritus status

Assistant to the Quorum of the Twelve Apostles
- October 6, 1972 – October 1, 1976
- End reason: Position abolished

Personal details
- Born: Oscar Leslie Stone; May 28, 1903; Chapin, Idaho, United States
- Died: April 26, 1986 (aged 82); Salt Lake City, Utah, United States

Oscar Leslie Stone (May 28, 1903 – April 26, 1986) was a general authority of the Church of Jesus Christ of Latter-day Saints (LDS Church) from 1972 until his death. He was the president of the church's Salt Lake Temple from 1968 to 1972.

Stone was born in Chapin, Teton County, Idaho, but was raised mainly in nearly Driggs. In 1920, he graduated from Brigham Young High School in Provo, Utah. Following graduation, he went to work for a bank in Price, Utah. He then went back to Idaho to work in Blackfoot City Bank. He was also involved in selling Model Ts, and ran two dance halls. In 1924, he married Dorothy Cobbley, who had helped him become more involved in the LDS Church, in the Salt Lake Temple. He then took a position as a partner in a store in Susanville, California along with his father and brother. Through expansion and merger, he ended up heading 75 stores and living in Portland, Oregon.

In 1931, Stone joined Safeway stores and advanced to being a vice president, living and working out of Oakland, California. In 1946, Stone joined with M. B. Skaggs in forming Skaggs-Stone Wholesale Company. The business merged with McKesson-Robbins in 1963, and for two years, Stone remained chairman of the board of the new company. Stone was elected chairman of the Samuel Merritt Hospital Development Fund in 1963, and president of the United Employers' Association of Oakland in 1962.

In the LDS Church, Stone served as bishop of the Oakland 5th Ward and as president of the Oakland-Berkeley Stake from 1957 to 1967. He was head of the Oakland Regional Welfare Program and involved with coordination around the building of the Oakland Temple, including being appointed chairman of the fund-raising committee. From 1963 to 1967, he was chairman of the Oakland Temple District, which covered Oregon, Washington and Northern California. In 1966, he was appointed chairman of the Brigham Young University alumni gifts committee. In 1967, he became a regional representative. From 1968 to 1972 he served as the president of the Salt Lake Temple and was then called as an Assistant to the Quorum of the Twelve Apostles; he was also managing director of the church music department. He served as an Assistant to the Twelve until 1976, when the church eliminated the position and Stone became a member of the First Quorum of the Seventy.

In 1980, Stone was released from active duties and designated as an emeritus general authority. In 1986, he died at his home in Salt Lake City, Utah.

Stone and his wife, Dorothy, had four sons. Two died fairly young. His son, Ronald V. Stone, served as president of the Argentina North Mission based in Cordoba, while their other son, Thomas R. Stone, was president of the French Polynesia Mission.
