= James A. Cullimore =

American Mormon leader (1906–1986)

Emeritus General Authority
- September 30, 1978 – June 14, 1986

First Quorum of the Seventy
- October 1, 1976 – September 30, 1978
- End reason: Granted general authority emeritus status

Assistant to the Quorum of the Twelve Apostles
- April 6, 1966 – October 1, 1976
- End reason: Position abolished

Personal details
- Born: James Alfred Cullimore; January 17, 1906; Lindon, Utah, United States
- Died: June 14, 1986 (aged 80); Salt Lake City, Utah, United States
- Resting place: Wasatch Lawn Memorial Park; 40°41′52.08″N 111°50′30.12″W
- Spouse(s): Grace Gardner
- Parents: Albert L.Cullimore; Luella Keetch

James Alfred Cullimore (January 17, 1906 – June 14, 1986) was a general authority of the Church of Jesus Christ of Latter-day Saints (LDS Church) from 1966 until his death.

Cullimore was born in Lindon, Utah. From 1925 to 1927, he was a LDS Church missionary in California. He received a bachelor's degree from Brigham Young University, where he was student body president, and a master's degree from New York University.

After completing his education, Cullimore opened a retail furniture store in Oklahoma City, Oklahoma. He was a branch president and district president in Oklahoma before becoming the first president of the LDS Church's Oklahoma Stake on October 23, 1960. After just a few weeks in this position, he was called to be the president of the church's Central British Mission.

In April 1966, Cullimore became an Assistant to the Quorum of the Twelve Apostles. When this position was abolished in 1976, he became a member of the First Quorum of the Seventy. In 1978, Cullimore was granted general authority emeritus status.

Cullimore died in Salt Lake City, Utah. He was the father of three children.
