= ElRay L. Christiansen =

American Mormon leader (1897–1975)

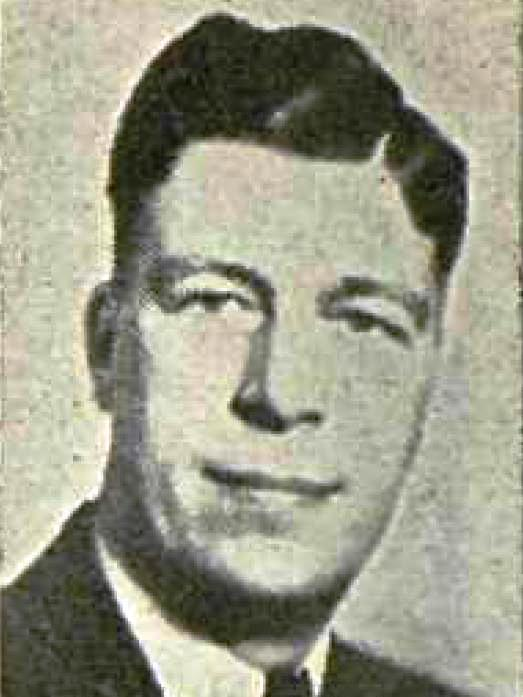
- Christiansen while president of the Texas–Louisiana Mission (c. 1940)

Assistant to the Quorum of the Twelve Apostles
- October 6, 1951 – December 2, 1975

Personal details
- Born: ElRay LaVar Christiansen; July 13, 1897; Mayfield, Utah, United States
- Died: December 2, 1975 (aged 78); Salt Lake City, Utah, United States
- Cause of death: Heart attack
- Resting place: Salt Lake City Cemetery; 40°46′37.92″N 111°51′28.8″W
- Spouse(s): Lewella Rees
- Children: 3

ElRay LaVar Christiansen (July 13, 1897 – December 2, 1975) was a general authority of the Church of Jesus Christ of Latter-day Saints (LDS Church) from 1951 until his death.

Christiansen was born in Mayfield, Utah, to Parley and Dorthea C. Christiansen. He studied at Utah State Agricultural College, Brigham Young University, and the University of Utah. Christiansen worked as a high school teacher and principal in various schools. He also worked for the United States Forest Service.

Christiansen married Lewella Ann Rees in 1922. They were the parents of three children. Shortly after their marriage, the couple served as LDS Church missionaries in the church's Central States Mission. From 1937 to 1941, he was the president of the church's Texas–Louisiana Mission. From 1943 to 1951 he was the president of the Logan Utah Temple. He was also a bishop and a stake president in the church.

Christiansen was made an Assistant to the Quorum of the Twelve Apostles in 1951. From 1954 to 1961 he was the president of the Salt Lake Temple and in 1964 he became the coordinator of all the church's temples.

Christiansen was a cellist and played with the Utah Symphony Orchestra. He died in Salt Lake City, Utah.
