= Marion D. Hanks =

American lawyer and LDS Church general authority (1921–2011)

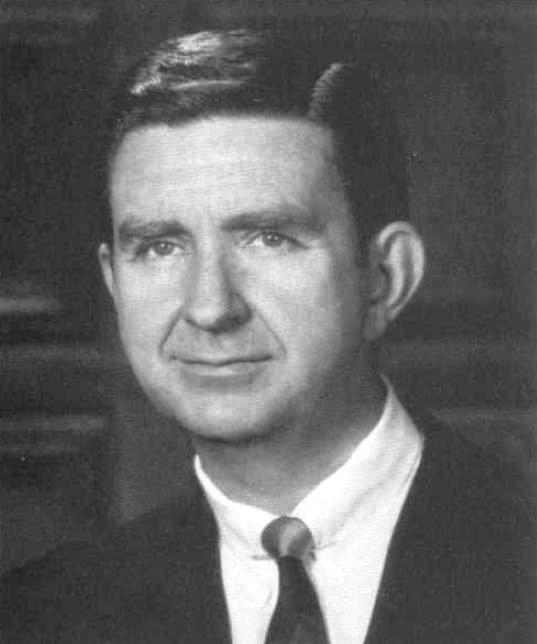

Emeritus General Authority
- October 3, 1992 – August 5, 2011

Presidency of the Seventy
- October 6, 1984 – August 15, 1992
- End reason: Honorably released

Presidency of the First Quorum of the Seventy
- October 1, 1976 – February 22, 1980
- End reason: Honorably released

First Quorum of the Seventy
- October 1, 1976 – October 3, 1992
- End reason: Granted general authority emeritus status

Assistant to the Quorum of the Twelve Apostles
- April 6, 1968 – October 1, 1976
- End reason: Position abolished

First Council of the Seventy
- October 4, 1953 – April 6, 1968
- End reason: Called as an Assistant to the Quorum of the Twelve Apostles

Personal details
- Born: Marion Duff Hanks; October 21, 1921; Salt Lake City, Utah, United States
- Died: August 5, 2011 (aged 89); Salt Lake City, Utah, United States
- Resting place: Wasatch Lawn Memorial Park; 40°41′52.08″N 111°50′30.12″W

Marion Duff Hanks (October 13, 1921 – August 5, 2011) was a general authority of the Church of Jesus Christ of Latter-day Saints (LDS Church) from 1953 until his death.

== Early life ==
Hanks was born in Salt Lake City, Utah. As a young man he served in the Northern States Mission of the LDS Church, which was headquartered in Chicago. He was in the United States Navy during World War II and received a J.D. from the University of Utah. Prior to his call as a general authority, Hanks worked as an instructor in the Church Educational System. Hanks married Maxine Christensen and became the father of five children.

== General authority ==
Hanks served in the Presidency of the Seventy twice following the 1976 reconstitution of the First Quorum of the Seventy. Previously, he also served on the First Council of the Seventy from 1953 to 1968 and as an Assistant to the Quorum of the Twelve Apostles from 1968 to 1976. During a three-year period in the early 1960s, Hanks was the president of the LDS Church mission in England. Among the missionaries in his mission were Jeffrey R. Holland and Quentin L. Cook, who both later became apostles of the church, as well as D. Michael Quinn, historian of Mormonism who was later excommunicated as one of the September Six.

In the mid-1970s, Hanks served as managing director of the church's Melchizedek Priesthood MIA. From 1982 to 1985, he was the president of the Salt Lake Temple. In the 1970s, Hanks was also a member of the Church Board of Education. In October 1992, Hanks was given general authority emeritus status.

Outside of his formal church responsibilities, Hanks preferred to be referred to as "Duff,” his middle name.

== Other activities ==
Hanks was a member of the President's Council on Physical Fitness and Sports (for which he received its Distinguished Service Award) and the President's Citizens Advisory Committee on Children and Youth. In 1988, Hanks was awarded the Silver Buffalo Award by the Boy Scouts of America (BSA). Hanks served for a time as a member of the National Council of the BSA. He also served as a member of the boards of Weber State University and Southern Utah University.

Hanks wrote the words to "That Easter Morn", which is hymn number 198 in the LDS Church's 1985 hymnal.

== Death ==
Hanks died at the age of 89. At the time of his death, Hanks was the oldest living former member of the First Quorum of the Seventy and the second-oldest emeritus general authority after Eldred G. Smith.
