= Franklin D. Richards (Mormon seventy) =

American lawyer

First Quorum of the Seventy
- October 1, 1976 – November 13, 1987
- Called by: Spencer W. Kimball

Presidency of the First Quorum of the Seventy
- October 1, 1976 – October 1, 1983
- Called by: Spencer W. Kimball
- End reason: Honorably released

Assistant to the Quorum of the Twelve Apostles
- October 8, 1960 – October 1, 1976
- Called by: David O. McKay
- End reason: Position abolished

Personal details
- Born: Franklin Dewey Richards; November 17, 1900; Ogden, Utah, United States
- Died: November 13, 1987 (aged 86); Salt Lake City, Utah, United States
- Resting place: Wasatch Lawn Memorial Park; 40°41′52.08″N 111°50′30.12″W
- Alma mater: University of Utah
- Spouse(s): Helen Kearnes
- Children: 4

Franklin Dewey Richards (November 17, 1900 – November 13, 1987) was a national commissioner of the United States Federal Housing Administration (FHA) and a general authority of the Church of Jesus Christ of Latter-day Saints.

Richards was born in Ogden, Utah to Charles C. Richards and Louisa L. Peery. He was the youngest of eight children. He was named after his paternal grandfather, who was a member of the church's Quorum of the Twelve Apostles from 1849 to 1899. Richards was married to Helen Kearnes and was the father of four children.

From 1920 to 1922, Richards served as a missionary for the church in the Eastern States Mission. During his mission, he was the president of the New York, Boston, and Brooklyn districts.

In 1923, Richards received a Bachelor of Laws degree from the University of Utah. He practiced law in Salt Lake City until being named as the first Utah director of the FHA. In 1947, he became the national commissioner of the FHA in Washington, D.C. During his time as commissioner the Shelley decision was released by the Supreme Court. Richards announced two weeks later that the decision would "in no way affect the programs of this agency" adding that it was not "the policy of the Government to require private individuals to give up their right to dispose of their property as they [see] fit, as a condition of receiving the benefits of the National Housing Act." Richards resigned from his position in 1952 and pursued a career in mortgage banking.

Prior to his call as a general authority, Richards served in the church as president of the Northwestern States Mission. In 1960, he became an Assistant to the Quorum of the Twelve Apostles. He served in this capacity until 1976, when the position was discontinued. As a result, he became a member of the newly constituted First Quorum of the Seventy and the senior president of the Presidency of the Seventy. In 1983, he was released from the Presidency of the Seventy to serve as the president of the Washington D.C. Temple; he served in this position until 1986.

Richards died at home in Salt Lake City and his funeral was held in the Salt Lake Assembly Hall on what would have been his 87th birthday. The speakers at his funeral included church apostles Gordon B. Hinckley, Thomas S. Monson, Marvin J. Ashton, and Richard G. Scott.

Richards was credited with creating the six-part missionary discussions which were used by the church for many years.

== See also ==
- "Elder Franklin D. Richards Eulogized," Ensign, January 1988, p. 74
