= William J. Critchlow Jr. =

American Mormon leader (1892–1968)

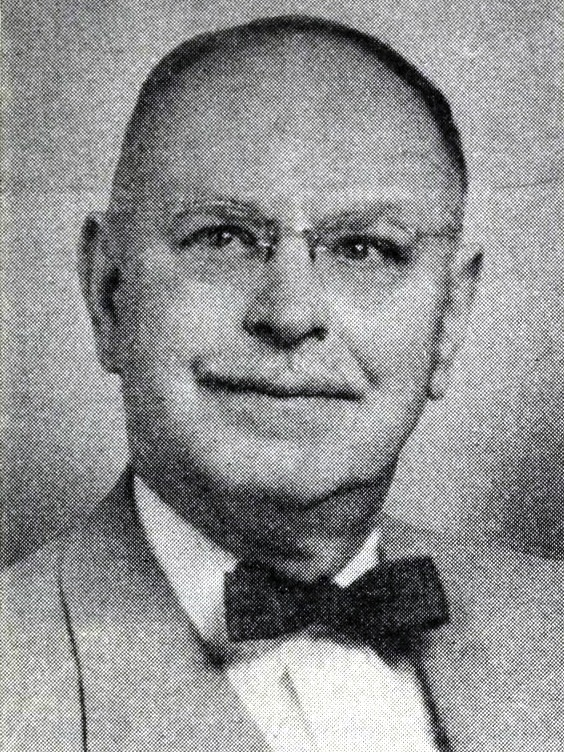

Assistant to the Quorum of the Twelve Apostles
- October 11, 1958 – August 30, 1968

Personal details
- Born: William James Critchlow Jr. August 21, 1892; Brigham City, Utah Territory, United States
- Died: August 30, 1968 (aged 76); Ogden, Utah, United States
- Resting place: Washington Heights Memorial Park; 41.1733°N 111.9689°W
- Spouse(s): Anna Marie Taylor
- Children: 3
- Parents: William J. Critchlow Sr. Anna Christine Gregerson (or Geiger)

William James Critchlow Jr. (August 21, 1892 – August 30, 1968) was a general authority of the Church of Jesus Christ of Latter-day Saints (LDS Church) from 1958 until his death.

Critchlow was born in Brigham City, Utah Territory. In 1934, he became a high priest in the LDS Church and in 1941 he became the first president of the church's South Ogden Stake.

On 11 October 1958, Critchlow became an Assistant to the Quorum of the Twelve Apostles. He held this position until his death in Ogden, Utah.
