= Conway Sonne =

Conway Ballantyne Sonne (December 28, 1917 – June 30, 1995) was a Standard Oil Company of California employee, the author of several books, and a prominent leader in the Church of Jesus Christ of Latter-day Saints (LDS Church) in Palo Alto, California.

== Biography ==
Sonne was born in Logan, Utah to Alma Sonne, who would later become a general authority in the LDS Church. As a young man, Conway Sonne was a Mormon missionary in the LDS Church's New England States Mission.

Sonne received a bachelor's degree from Utah State University and an MBA from Harvard Business School.

From 1943 to 1946 Sonne served as a financial analyst and liaison officer with the United States Army Quartermaster Corps. From 1949 to 1981 he served as a financial officer of Standard Oil. He also served as a trustee of the National Maritime Museum Association.

In the LDS Church, Sonne served as a first counselor in the bishopric of the Palo Alto Ward, a member of the high council of the Palo Alto Stake, and in several other callings.

The books Sonne wrote were Knight of the Kingdom: The Story of Richard Ballantyne (1949), What Would You Write (1956), World of Wakara (1962), Saints on the Sea, A Maritime History of Mormon Migration (1983), Ships, Saints, and Mariners: A Maritime Encyclopedia of Mormon Migration (1987), and A Man Named Alma (1988), which was a biography of his father.

Sonne and his wife Elain Winch had four sons.
