= Bernard P. Brockbank =

American Mormon leader (1909–2000)

Bernard Park Brockbank, Sr.
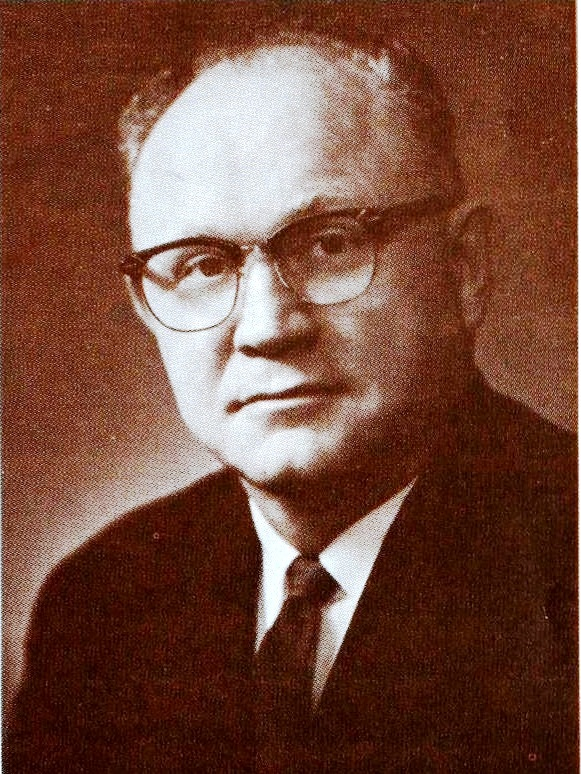
- Brockbank in 1962

Emeritus General Authority
- October 4, 1980 – October 11, 2000

First Quorum of the Seventy
- October 1, 1976 – October 4, 1980
- End reason: Granted general authority emeritus status

Assistant to the Quorum of the Twelve Apostles
- October 6, 1962 – October 1, 1976
- End reason: Position abolished

Personal details
- Born: Bernard Park Brockbank; May 9, 1909; Salt Lake City, Utah, United States
- Died: October 11, 2000 (aged 91); Holladay, Utah, United States
- Resting place: Wasatch Lawn Memorial Park; 40°41′52.08″N 111°50′30.12″W
- Spouse(s): Nada Rich(1935-1967); Frances Morgan(1968-2000)
- Children: With Nada (six); Loren R. Brockbank; Roger Brockbank; Bernard Park Jr. Bruce Brockbank; Von Brockbank; Diane Brockbank; With Frances (four adopted); Roderick R. Brockbank; Michael Brockbank; Dr. Linda Brockbank; Patricia Ann Brockbank
- Parents: Taylor P. Brockbank; Sarah H. LeCheminant

Bernard Park Brockbank, Sr. (May 24, 1909 – October 11, 2000) was a general authority of the Church of Jesus Christ of Latter-day Saints (LDS Church) from 1962 to his death. Brockbank was an Assistant to the Quorum of the Twelve from 1962 to 1976 and a member of the First Quorum of the Seventy from 1976 to 1980. One of his major contributions was heading the Mormon Pavilion at the New York World's Fair in 1964 and 1965.

== Early life ==
Brockbank was born in Salt Lake City, Utah to Taylor P. Brockbank and Sarah LeCheminant. He attended Utah State University, George Washington University and the University of Utah and became employed in the real estate business in Utah.

== Family ==
Brockbank married Nada Rich. They had six children. The year after she died he married Frances Morgan (Rivero) and adopted her four children.

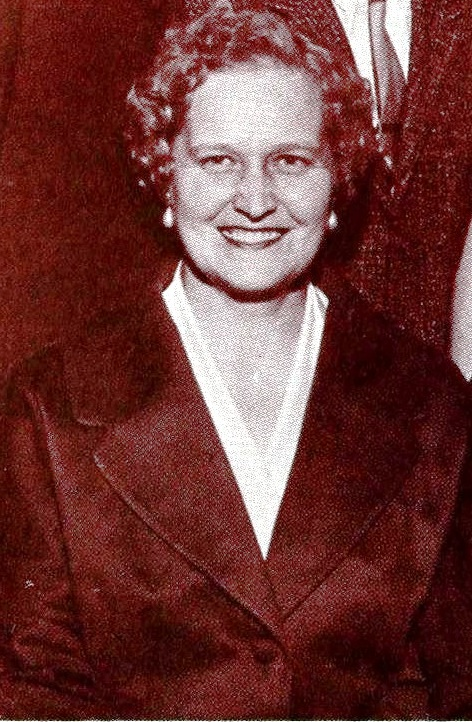
Nada R. Brockbank

== Church service ==
As a young man Brockbank served a mission for the LDS Church in Great Britain. He later served as a bishop and later as a stake president.

When the North British (now the England Leeds) Mission of the LDS Church was organized in 1960, Brockbank served as its first president. This was the first division of the British Mission in more than a century. Less than a year later, the Scottish–Irish (now the Scotland-Ireland) Mission was organized with Brockbank also the president of that mission. During his time as president of this mission, Brockbank oversaw the building of chapels in Aberdeen, Scotland and other locations. In 1962, Brockbank became an Assistant to the Quorum of the Twelve Apostles.

Brockbank was the head of the Managing Director of the Mormon Pavilion at the New York World's Fair in 1964 and 1965. This pavilion majorly increased the amount of notice the church had in New York City and led to a major increase in the number of baptisms performed by the missionaries in the area. Brockbank was also involved with the later Mormon Pavilion at the 1970 World's Fair in Osaka, Japan. In 1973, Brockbank was called as president of the International Mission of the church, with responsibility for all areas where the church was not then organized. In 1975, Brockbank was among seven Assistants to the Quorum of the Twelve assigned to live outside the United States.

When the position of Assistant to the Twelve was eliminated in 1976, Brockbank became a member of the First Quorum of the Seventy. He served in this capacity until 1980, when he was made an emeritus general authority of the LDS Church. He died in Holladay, Utah in 2000.
