= Sterling W. Sill =

Emeritus General Authority
- December 31, 1978 – May 25, 1994

First Quorum of the Seventy
- October 1, 1976 – December 31, 1978
- End reason: Granted general authority emeritus status

Assistant to the Quorum of the Twelve Apostles
- April 6, 1954 – October 1, 1976
- End reason: Position abolished

Personal details
- Born: Sterling Welling Sill; March 31, 1903; Layton, Utah, United States
- Died: May 25, 1994 (aged 91); Salt Lake City, Utah, United States
- Resting place: Kaysville City Cemetery; 41°2′42″N 111°55′35.04″W
- Spouse(s): Doris Mary Thornley
- Children: 3 John M. Sill; David S. Sill; Mary Carolyn Sill
- Parents: Joseph Albert Sill; Marietta Welling

Sterling Welling Sill (March 31, 1903 – May 25, 1994) was a general authority in the Church of Jesus Christ of Latter-day Saints (LDS Church). He was an Assistant to the Quorum of the Twelve Apostles from 1954 to 1976 and was a member of the First Quorum of the Seventy from 1976 to 1978. In 1978, he received general authority emeritus status.

Born in Layton, Utah, Sill was a Mormon missionary in the southern United States from 1924 to 1926.

Sill studied at the University of Utah and Utah State University. He later served as a member of the University of Utah Board of Regents for many years including several years as the chairman of that board.

Prior to being called as a general authority, Sill served in many callings in the LDS Church, including ten years as a bishop. He and his wife, Doris Mary Thornley, were the parents of three children.

From his book "How to Personally Profit From the Laws of Success," comes this brief biography of Sterling's life:

"The story of Sterling W. Sill's life is a personal and financial success story. As his own experience attests: 'there is no such thing as a lack of opportunity. The important thing is to believe, and then take the first step.' Readers of Mr. Sill's twenty-one books and listeners to his many radio broadcasts will welcome this new volume... ...Entering the insurance business as a salesman for New York Life in 1927, he rose quickly in the company. Under his direction the Intermountain General Office became the largest office of the entire company in sales volume and remained so for many years. Mr. Sill served on the Board of Regents at the University of Utah and a building on the campus is named in his honor. He has also served as President of the Salt Lake Exchange Club and of the Salt Lake Association of Life Underwriters. He is listed in Who's Who in America, 1976-1977. The quality of courage which Sterling W. Sill esteems is not absent from his own life. In 1960 he was awarded the Carnegie Hero Medal for helping to save a thirteen year old boy from drowning in the ocean."

== Bibliography ==
- Leadership (1958)
- Leadership Vol 2 (1960)
- The Glory of the Sun (1961)
- The Upward Reach (1962)
- The Law of the Harvest (1963)
- The Way of Success (1964)
- What Doth It Profit (1965)
- The Miracle of Personality (1966)
- The Quest for Excellence (1967)
- The Power of Believing (1968)
- The Three Infinities: To Know, To Do, To Be (1969)
- The Strength of Great Possessions (1970)
- Making the Most of Yourself (1971)
- The Majesty of Books (1972)
- The Keys to the Kingdom (1972)
- Christmas Sermons (1973)
- That Ye May Have Life (1974)
- Thy Kingdom Come (1975)
- The Law of Success (1975)
- Power, Principles, and Promises (1975)
- This Nation Under God (1976)
- The Wealth of Wisdom (1977)
- How to Personally Profit from the Laws of Success (1977)
- Leadership Vol 3 (1978)
- This We Believe (1979)
- The Nine Life of Sterling W. Sill (1979)
- Lessons from Great Lives (1981)
- Meditations of Death and Life (1983)
- The Best of Sterling W. Sill (1983)
- The Power of Poetry (1984)
- Great Literature and the Good Life (1985)
- Our World of Wonders (1986)
