= Salt Lake Temple =

Latter-day Saint temple in Salt Lake City, Utah, U.S.

- Closed for renovation
- Salt Lake Temple is the centerpiece of the 10-acre (4.0 ha) Temple Square in Salt Lake City, Utah
- Interactive map of Salt Lake Temple
- Number: 4
- Dedication: 6 April 1893, by Wilford Woodruff
- Site: 10 acres (4.0 ha)
- Floor area: 382,207 ft^{2} (35,508.2 m^{2})
- Height: 222 ft (68 m)
- Official website • News & images

Church chronology
← Manti Utah Temple	Salt Lake Temple	→ Laie Hawaii Temple

Additional information
- Announced: 28 July 1847, by Brigham Young
- Groundbreaking: 14 February 1853, by Brigham Young
- Open house: 5 April 1893; 5 April–1 October 2027
- Rededicated: TBA, by TBA
- Designed by: Truman O. Angell
- Location: Salt Lake City, Utah, United States
- Coordinates: 40°46′14″N 111°53′31″W
- Exterior finish: Quartz monzonite
- Design: Neo-Gothic, Neo-Romanesque, six-spire temple
- Baptistries: 2
- Ordinance rooms: 5 (stationary)
- Sealing rooms: 22
- Clothing rental: Available
- Visitors' center: Yes
- Notes: The Salt Lake temple was dedicated in 31 sessions held between April 6 and 24, 1893.

The Salt Lake Temple is a temple of the Church of Jesus Christ of Latter-day Saints on Temple Square in Salt Lake City, Utah, United States. Dedicated in 1893, it was constructed over a period of 40 years. It is the sixth temple completed by the church and the fourth built since the Mormon exodus from Nauvoo, Illinois to Utah in the 1840s. At 382,207 square feet (35,508.2 m^{2}), it is the largest Latter-day Saint temple by floor area.

The temple was closed in 2019 for remodeling, which includes a seismic retrofit of the structure. In 2027, the church will hold public open house tours of the newly renovated building, after which it will be re-dedicated for worship services.

== Details ==
The Salt Lake Temple is the centerpiece of the 10-acre (4.0 ha) Temple Square in Salt Lake City, Utah. Like other Latter-day Saint temples, the church and its members consider it sacred and a temple recommend is required to enter, so there are no public tours inside the temple as there are for other adjacent buildings on Temple Square. In 1912, the first public photographs of the interior were published in the book The House of the Lord, by James E. Talmage. Since then, various photographs have been published, including by Life magazine in 1938. The temple grounds are open to the public and are a popular tourist attraction. Due to its location at church headquarters and its historical significance, Latter-day Saints from around the world patronize the temple.

The Salt Lake Temple is also the location of the weekly meetings of the First Presidency and the Quorum of the Twelve Apostles. As such, there are special meeting rooms in the building for these purposes, including the Holy of Holies, which are not part of other temples.

The temple uses gothic and fortress-like elements, including buttresses, towers, and battlements along the roofline, that are intended to evoke Solomon's temple throughout the design. The baptismal font is meant to be a direct recreation of the Molten Sea, with the font placed on the back of twelve oxen that represents the Twelve Tribes of Israel. At the east end of the building, the height of the center pinnacle to the base of the angel Moroni is 210 feet (64 m).

=== Location ===
The temple is in downtown Salt Lake City, with several mountain peaks close by. The design of Salt Lake City was derived from the city of Zion in Missouri, with the temple at the center. Orson Pratt was assigned by Brigham Young to modify the plan to fit the design that would become Salt Lake City. On August 2, 1847, at the southeast corner of modern Temple Square was placed the base and meridian, from which the rest of the streets were identified and surveyed. Nearby, a shallow stream, City Creek, splits and flows both to the west and to the south, flowing into the Jordan River. There is a wall around the 10-acre (4.0 ha) temple site. The surrounding wall became the first permanent structure on what has become known as Temple Square. The wall is a uniform 15 feet (4.6 m) high but varies in appearance because of the site's southwest slope.

== Uses ==
Visitors' Center Cutaway Models

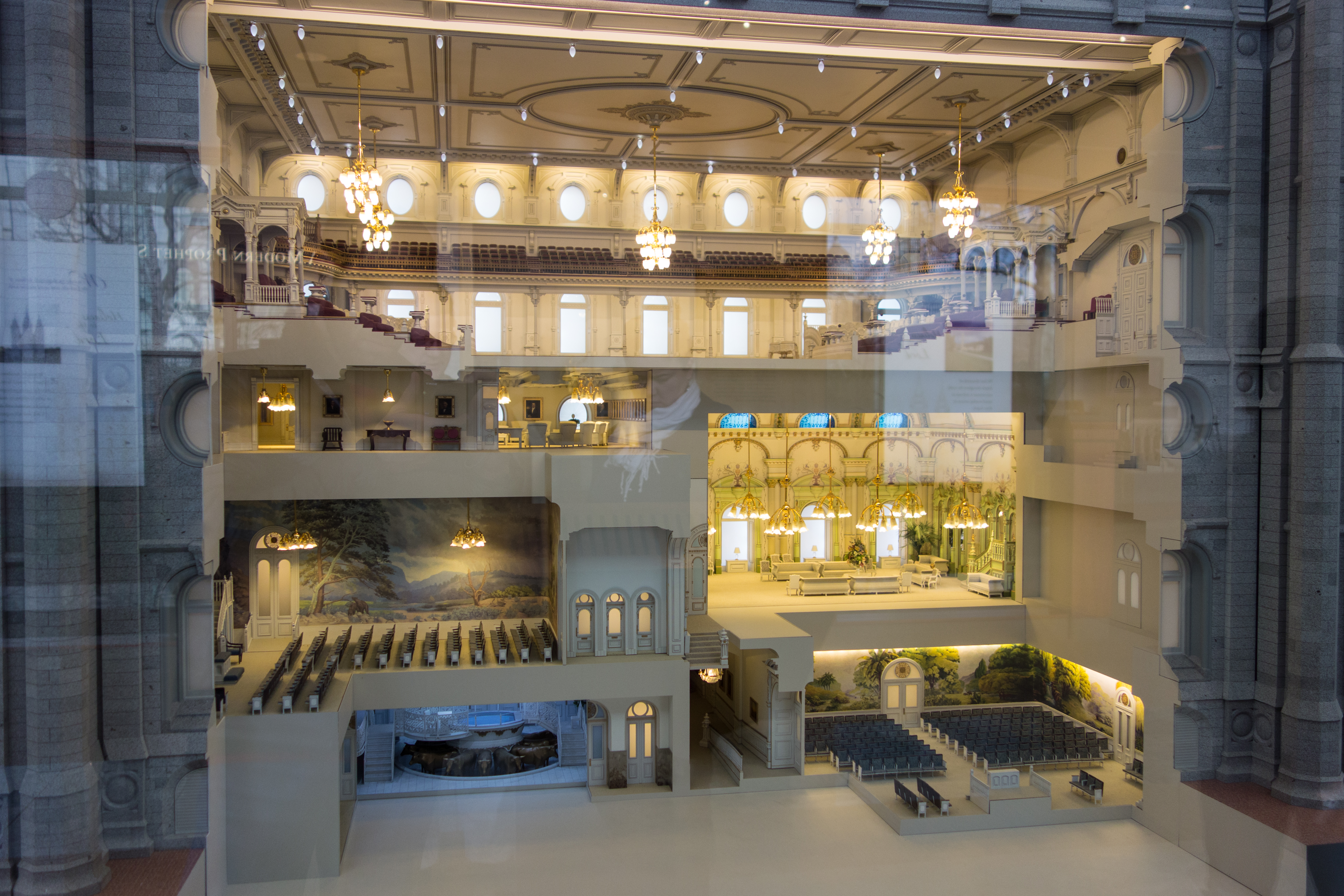
Interior layout of the temple from 1893–2019

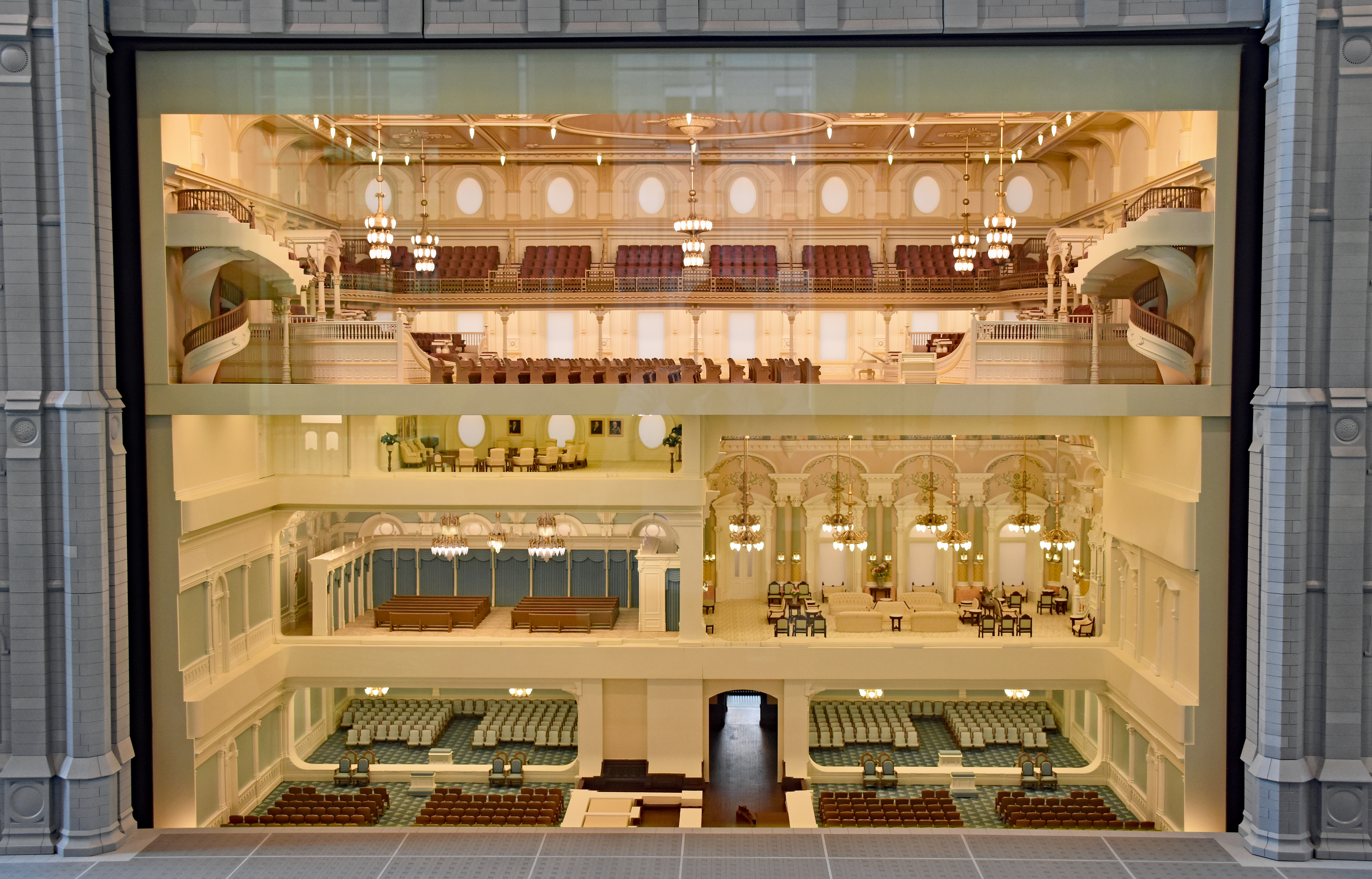
Interior layout of the temple following the 2020s renovation

The temple is considered the house of God and is reserved for special ceremonies for practicing Latter-day Saints. The main ordinance rooms are used during the endowment ceremony—namely the creation, garden, telestial, terrestrial, and celestial rooms in that order of use. A washing and anointing ceremony is also administered, and until 1921, the rooms were also used for healing rituals of washing and anointing for the sick or pregnant and were administered by women and men. The temple also serves as a place for marriage sealing ceremonies for live and deceased persons. Additional uses include functioning as a location for baptisms for the dead, baptisms for health (until being discontinued in 1921), and, briefly, for re-baptism for the renewal of covenants. Other rituals performed in the temple include the second anointing ordinance for live and deceased persons, and meeting rooms for church leaders.

== Construction and dedication ==
The temple's location was first marked by Brigham Young, the church's second president, on July 28, 1847, just four days after he arrived in the Salt Lake Valley. In a spot between two forks of City Creek, Young struck the ground with a cane, saying: "Here will be the Temple of our God." According to B. H. Roberts, Oliver Cowdry had a gift from the Lord in the form of "a stick which was like Aaron's rod." Anthon H. Lund said that Phineas Young (brother-in-law of Oliver Cowdry and brother of Brigham Young) got it from Cowdry, and gave it to Brigham Young, who had the stick when he arrived in the Salt Lake Valley, and used it to point out where the temple should be built.

The temple site was dedicated on February 14, 1853, by Heber C. Kimball. The groundbreaking ceremony was presided over by Young, who laid the cornerstone on April 6, 1853, the twenty-third anniversary of the church being organized. The architect was Truman O. Angell, and the temple features both Gothic and Romanesque elements.

An annex, designed by Joseph Don Carlos Young, is built 100 feet north of the temple. The construction of the annex started in 1892, and it was opened in 1893, at the same time as the temple itself. This building included a large entrance area and an assembly hall. In August of 1962, the main temple was closed. A new annex was opened at the north end of the temple square in March of 1966, which largely expanded the temple's capacity with a 400 seat chapel, underground dressing rooms, 4,000 lockers and large waiting rooms for marriage ceremonies. Both the annex and the addition were built using the same granite from the original quarry and designed to match the temple's architecture.

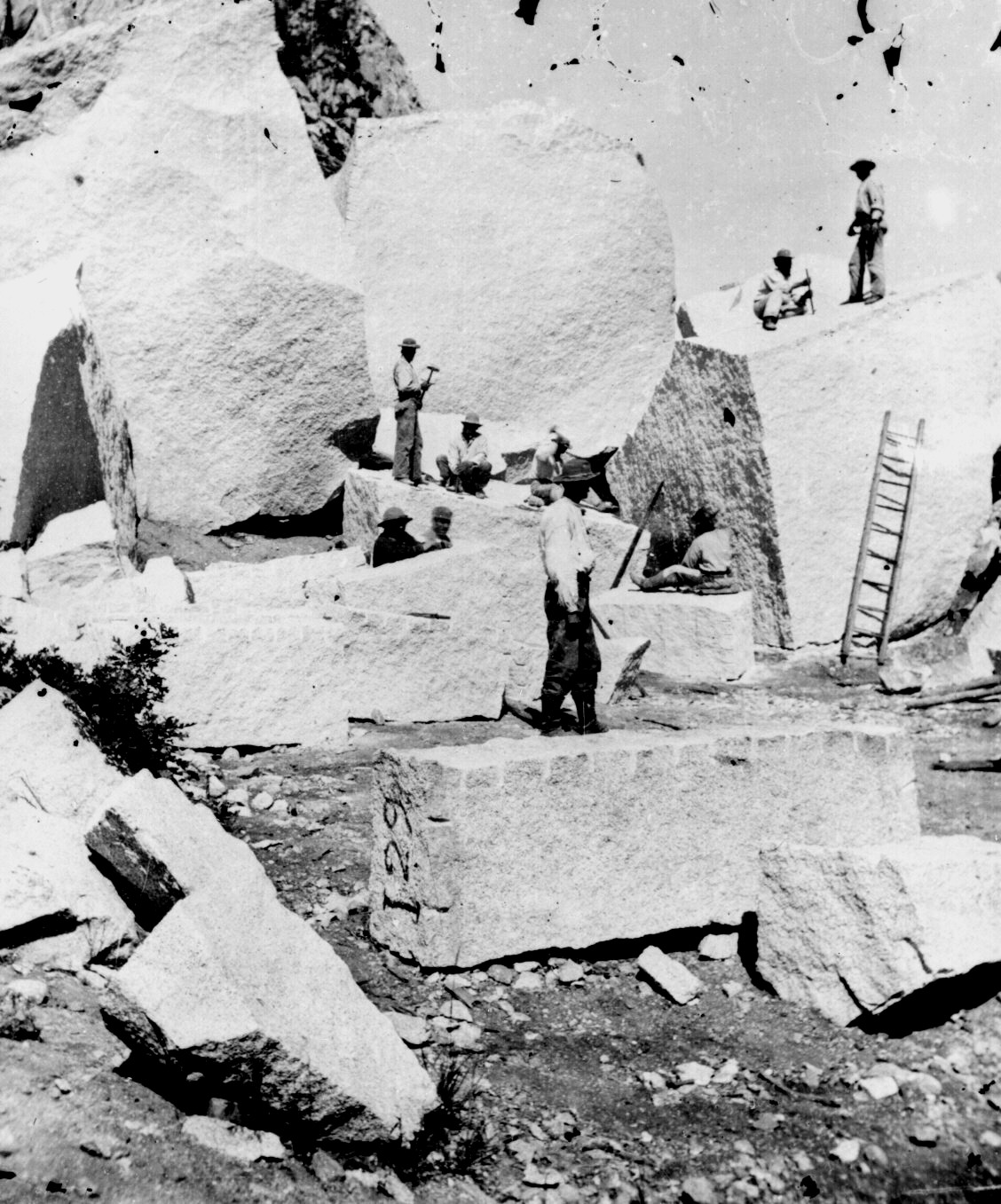
Quartz monzonite for temple being quarried at Little Cottonwood Canyon (1872)

Sandstone was originally used for the foundation. During the Utah War, the foundation was buried and the lot made to look like a plowed field to prevent unwanted attention from federal troops. With the outbreak of the American Civil War in 1861, the troops were called away by December. In the spring, when the foundation was uncovered to continue work, it was discovered that many of the foundation stones had cracked, making them unsuitable to hold the weight of the massive temple. Although not all of the sandstone was replaced, the inadequate sandstone was replaced. The walls are quartz monzonite (which has the appearance of granite) from Little Cottonwood Canyon, twenty miles (thirty-two kilometres) southeast of the temple site. Oxen transported the quarried rock initially, but as the Transcontinental Railroad neared completion in 1869 the remaining stones were carried by rail at a much faster rate.

During the construction, the temple grounds were seized by the US Marshal as a result of the Edmunds–Tucker Act of 1886. It was later returned to the church.

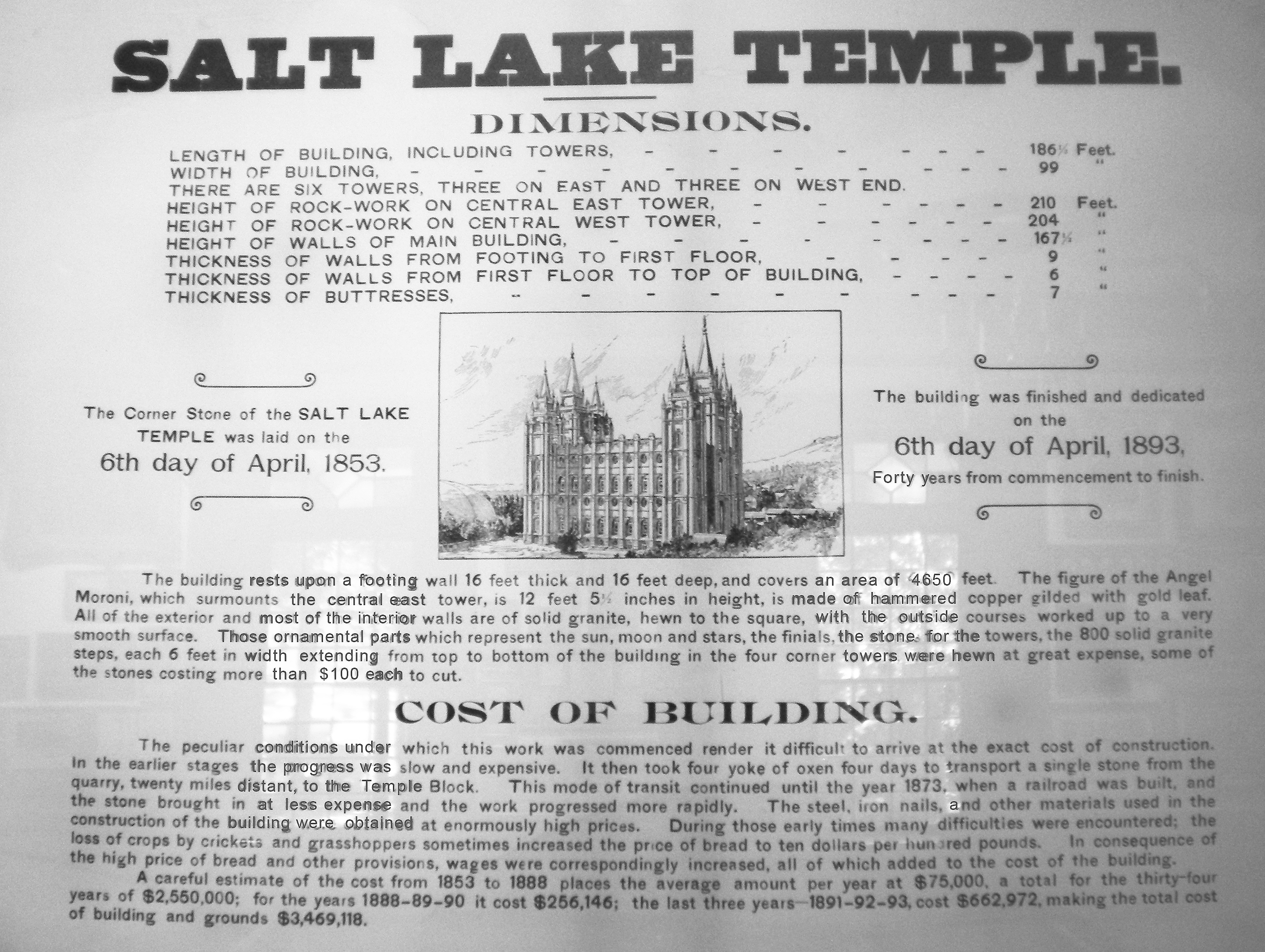
A plaque with construction details

The capstone—the granite sphere that holds the statue of the angel Moroni—was laid on April 6, 1892, by means of an electric motor and switch operated by Wilford Woodruff, the church's fourth president, thus completing work on the temple's exterior. The angel Moroni statue, standing 12.5 feet (3.8 m) tall, was placed on top of the capstone later the same day. At the capstone ceremony, Woodruff proposed the building's interior be finished within one year, which would allow the temple to be dedicated forty years, to the day, after its commencement. John R. Winder was instrumental in overseeing the interior's completion on schedule; he would serve as a member of the temple presidency until his death in 1910. Woodruff dedicated the temple on April 6, 1893, exactly forty years after the cornerstone was laid.

=== 2019 to 2027 renovation ===
At the end of 2019, the temple was closed for a seismic retrofitting designed to allow it to withstand a magnitude 7.3 earthquake, the strongest expected magnitude in the Salt Lake Valley. Other facilities on Temple Square (and certain parts of the temple) were demolished, reconstructed, and modernized in line with seismic code. Mechanical, electrical, and plumbing systems were replaced, Initially the interior and its historical artifacts were planned to be preserved (although plans were later changed and many historic elements were removed) and plazas and landscaping modified. Temple Square visitor access and tourism would remain during the entire renovation process, but in regulated and coordinated fashion.

Prior to 2019, the building had never been decommissioned for renovation and only minor updating of finishes and systems had occurred within the temple proper (although multiple "annex" additions had been added and removed in the past). This meant the temple's core historic architecture, layout, and workmanship had been preserved for 126 years.

Before reconstruction started, church leaders indicated that the temple's unique historicity would be preserved. Church employees stated that special efforts would be made to highlight and honor the pioneer craftsmanship and indicated the interiors would essentially remain the same. Various renderings were released showing the instruction rooms used for the endowment ceremony would remain intact, with the original layout, woodwork and murals being preserved.

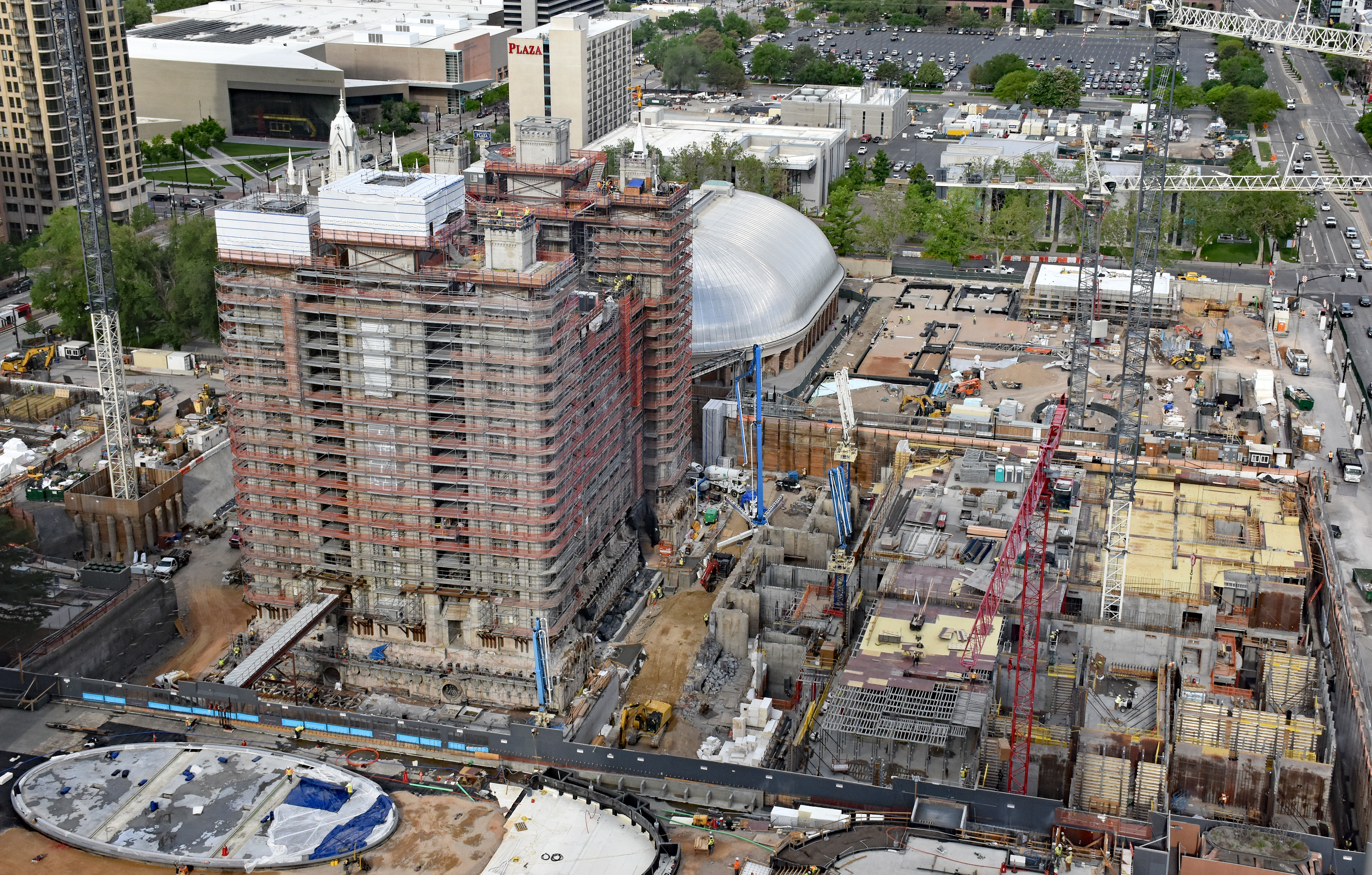
The temple under renovation, with construction on its large underground north addition visible

In March 2021, the church announced significant changes to the renovation plan that affected many elements in the temple's historic interior. The progressive room-to-room live endowment ceremony would be removed and the layout of the temple would change, with the baptistry being moved to the annex and new instruction rooms constructed in its place. Other rooms and walls would be reconfigured, requiring the removal of the temple's murals. The murals and many other historic features of the building were photographed and otherwise documented before being permanently removed or destroyed. These changes will allow for greater patron capacity, but the removal of many historic elements was met with criticism, especially the destruction of the temple's murals. One prominent historian described the changes as a "huge and unnecessary loss" and another noted them as a loss of "priceless cultural artifacts".

The renovations were initially expected to take approximately four years, however the completion date was pushed out first to 2025 and again to 2026. In 2025, church president Russell M. Nelson announced that an open house would be held in 2027; these public tours will occur April 5 through October 1, 2027. For the first time, public tours of a temple will also occur on Sundays, due to a "once-in-a-generation opportunity", in anticipation of "millions" of visitors. The temple was last open to the public prior to its original dedication in 1893.

== Symbolism ==
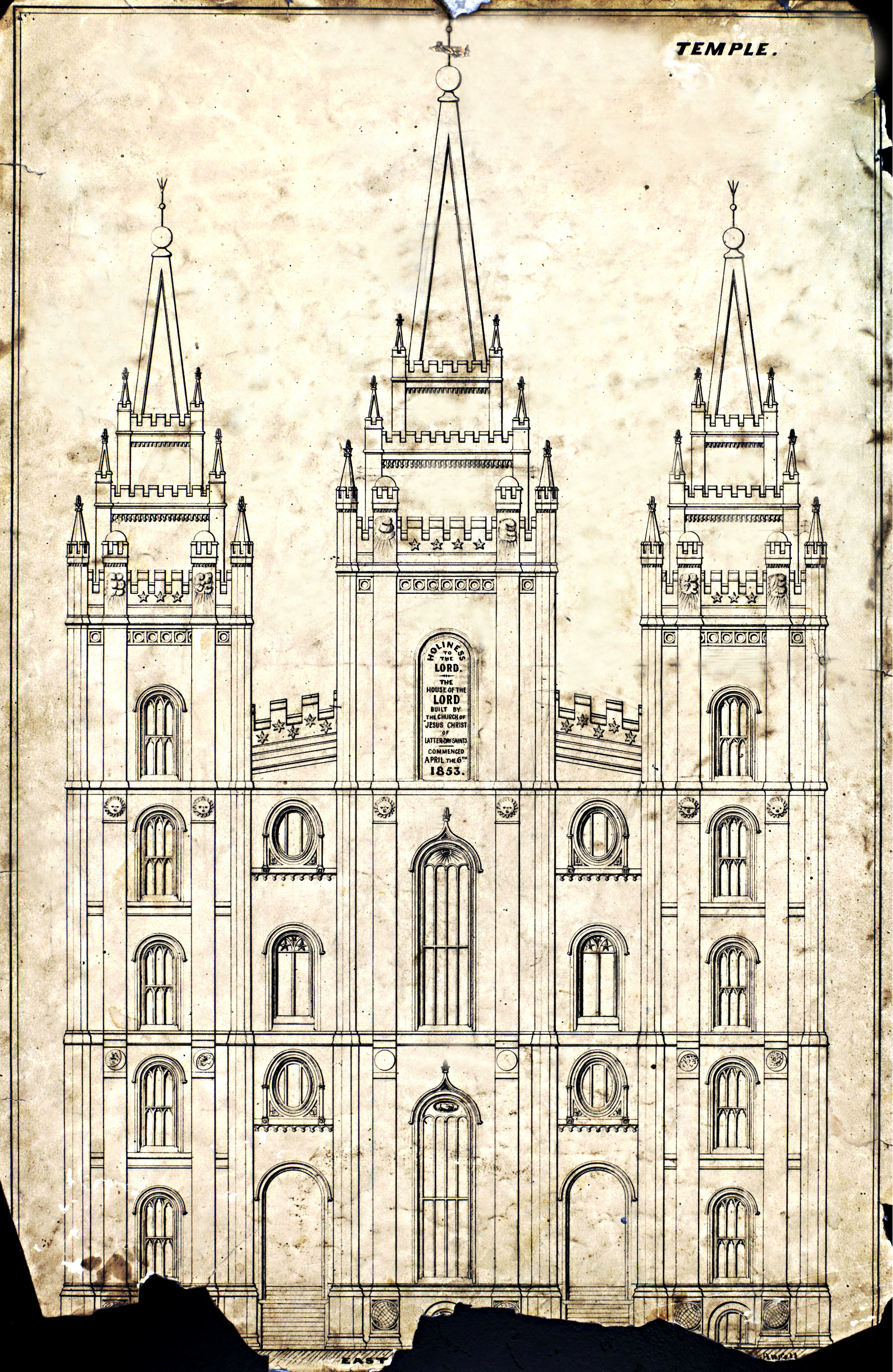
Original 1854 design of the East side showing the horizontal angel, sun faces, Earth details, and compass and square window details. These elements were later modified or removed.

For the symbols detailed on the temple, the interpretation between symbols and their relationships creates meaning, which is layered in its use. An unnamed Latter-day Saint scholar stated that humans, being finite, prefer one-to-one pairing, while the divine mind works in many layers, and a single symbol can "teach volumes to those who are properly prepared." In speaking about the Salt Lake Temple, Benjamin F. Goddard said: "As I gaze upon it day after day and month after month I learn new lessons."

The Salt Lake Temple incorporates many symbolic adornments, some of which are also used in Freemasonry. Masonic writer S.H. Goodwin listed the square and compass, beehive, and all-seeing eye listed among Masonic emblems found on Latter-day Saint buildings, including the Salt Lake temple. The square and compass appeared in the temple's original 1854 drawings, but were not part of the final structure. Church architect Truman O. Angell wrote that the temple's symbols had no connection to Freemasonry and that Brigham Young had developed them through study of scripture, particularly the Old Testament. Allen D. Roberts stated that Brigham Young did not feel he was borrowing from Masonry (which did not exist in Utah for several years after 1847), but rather from a "universal body of truth." Roberts concluded that Masonic influence was nonetheless evident in the temple's design as late as 1886.

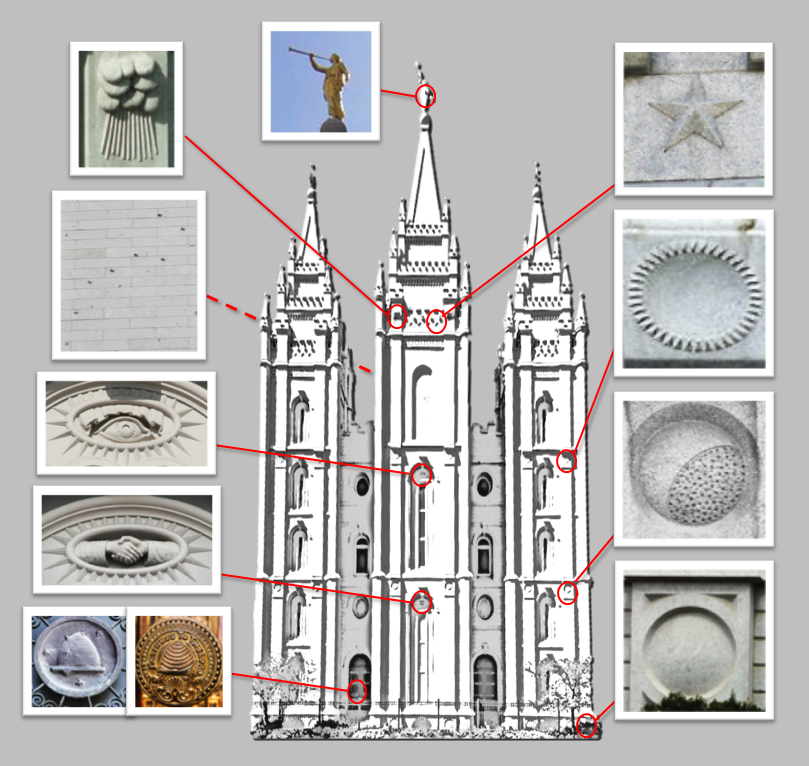
Some of the temple's exterior symbols

Britannica says that the exterior is full of complex symbolism that depicts tenets of the faith, along with the human journey from life, death, and eternity. These symbols include the following:

- All-seeing eye – The center tower on each side has a depiction of the all-seeing eye of God representing how God sees all things.

Detail of the exterior

- Angel statue – The golden angel Moroni statue, by sculptor Cyrus E. Dallin, tops the capstone of the temple. It symbolizes the angel mentioned in Revelation 14:6 that will come to welcome in the Second Coming of Christ. Early architectural plans showed two horizontally flying angels and the earliest references to the Salt Lake Temple's angel were always Gabriel. The original blueprint drawings intended the angel to be wearing temple ceremonial clothing like the angel on the Nauvoo Temple, but Paris-trained sculptor Dallin's 12.5 feet (3.8 m) statue wears a crown instead of a temple cap that included a bright light which created a halo effect at night. As a result of an earthquake on March 18, 2020, the statue's trumpet broke. The statue was reinstalled April 2, 2024.
- Big Dipper – On the west side of the temple the Big Dipper appears, which represents how the priesthood can help people find their way to heaven as the constellation helped travelers find the North Star. The uppermost stars on the temple's constellation align with the actual North Star, which symbolizes the direction of the heavens.
- Compass and square – Early plan drawings of the temple show the Masonic arrangements of a compass and square placed around the second and fourth floor windows, but the plans were changed during construction.
- Clasped hands – Above each external door and doorknob appears the "hand clasp," which is a representation of covenants that are made within temples or brotherly love. According to scholars Hugh Nibley and Donald Parry, clasped hands "have always represented recognition and acceptance of those who were once apart," along with reciprocation of knowledge.
- Clouds – On the east side of the temple are "clouds raining down" representing the way God has continued revelation and still speaks to man "like the rains out of Heaven" or alternatively a veil of ignorance or sin.
- Earths – The Earthstones in the lower buttresses have been interpreted as the gospel of Christ spreading over the whole Earth. Each of the fifty buttresses is four feet wide and weighs over six thousand pounds. Each buttress has a moonstone at the midpoint and a sunstone at the top, with earth being the third, each of the three degrees of glory - telestial, terrestrial, and celestial - are represented here.

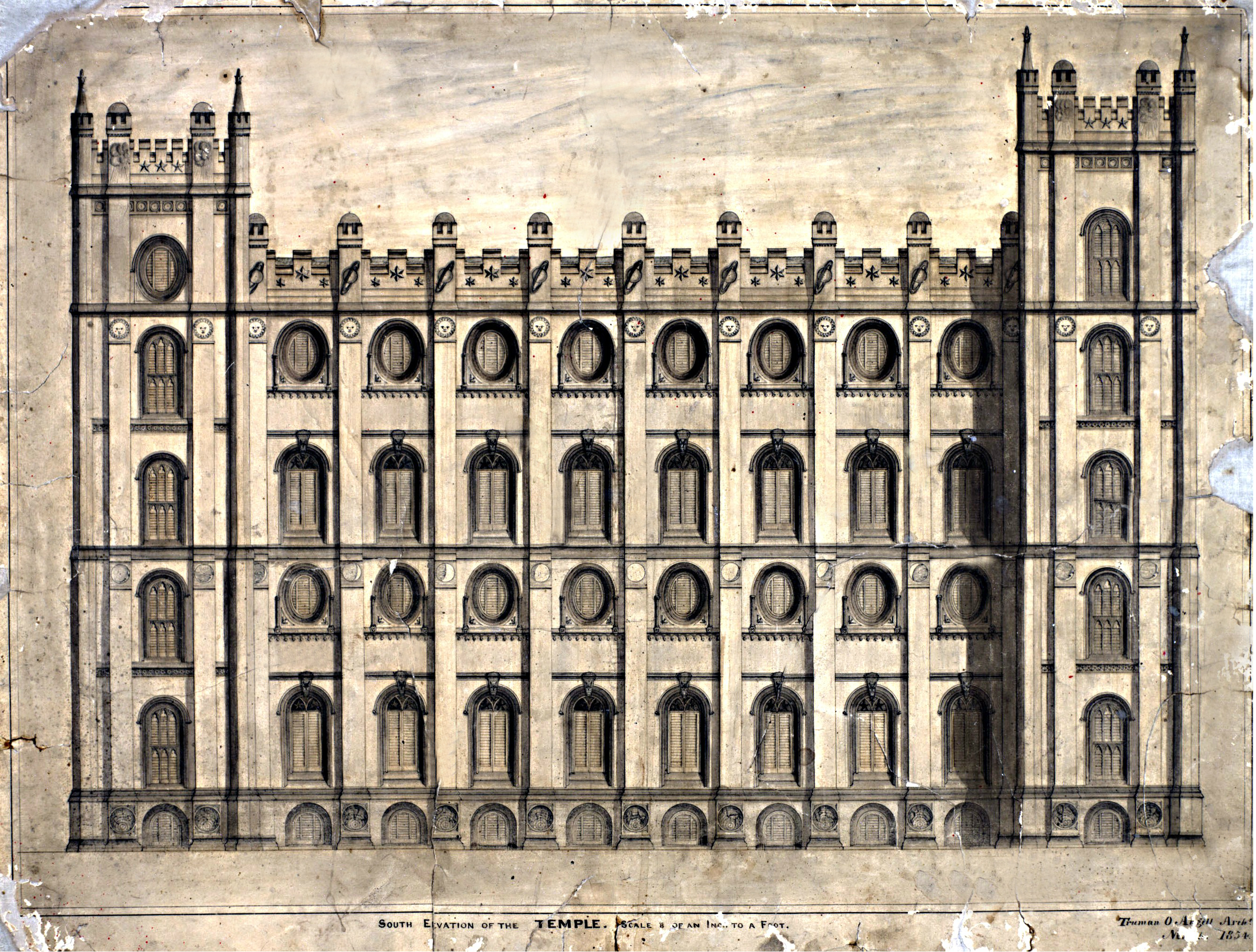
An original 1854 elevation plan showing the saturnstones, earthstone detail, Sun faces, and square and compass window accents. These elements were later discarded.

- Saturns – Early drawings and a written description by Angell showed Saturnstones along the top tier of the temple, though the design was changed years later.
- Spires – The six spires of the temple represent the power of the priesthood. The three spires on the east side are a little higher than those on the west: they represent the Melchizedek, or "higher priesthood", and the Aaronic, or "preparatory priesthood" respectively. The three spires on the east side represent the church's First Presidency and the twelve smaller spires on those three represent the Twelve Apostles.
- Sun, moon, and stars – Around the temple there are several carved stones depicting the Sun, Moon, and stars which correspond respectively to the celestial, terrestrial, and telestial kingdoms of glory in the afterlife. The sunstones have also been interpreted to represent God, the moonstones in different phases as representing different phases of life, and the starstones representing Jesus Christ. These symbols were drawn from the three lesser lights symbols in the Freemasonry practiced by many early church leaders in Nauvoo. Additionally, five-pointed stars have traditionally represented the five wounds of Christ (hands, feet, and side) and the five-pointed star with an elongated downward ray found on several LDS temples has been interpreted to represent Christ coming to Earth.

== Incidents ==
=== Bombings ===
Two bombing incidents have damaged the temple. On April 10, 1910, a bomb at the nearby Hotel Utah (now the Joseph Smith Memorial Building) damaged the trumpet of the Moroni statue atop the temple. On November 14, 1962, the southeast door of the Salt Lake Temple was bombed. FBI agents state that the explosive had been wrapped around the door handles on the temple's southeast entrance. The large wooden entrance doors were damaged by flying fragments of metal and glass. Damage to interior walls occurred 25 feet inside the temple, but damage to the interior was minor. Eleven exterior windows were shattered.

=== 1999 Salt Lake City tornado ===
On August 11, 1999, a tornado, rated F2 on the Fujita scale and the worst in Utah history, hit Salt Lake City and passed over Temple Square. People at the Salt Lake Temple for a wedding huddled together as the tornado passed over the historic block. Over its path, the tornado caused $150 million in damage, killed one person, and injured more than 150. It uprooted trees, split branches in half, destroyed landscaping, and broke windows at the visitors' center that housed the Christus statute. A popular spot for photos under a 50-year-old honeysuckle shrub named the "Sweetheart Tree," was completely uprooted, too damaged to be replanted. Temple Square was shut down for a day for damage assessment and repair, and opened the next day, where activities proceeded as normal.

=== 2020 Salt Lake City earthquake ===
On the morning of March 18, 2020, a magnitude 5.7 earthquake struck just outside Salt Lake City. Though most of the damage was outside the city, minor damage was inflicted on the temple. The trumpet of the Angel Moroni on top of the temple's tallest spire was dislodged from the statue, and some stones from the smaller spires were displaced. No other damage to the temple was reported. The temple was early in its renovation process at the time, and the rest of the statue was removed the following May. Renovation procedures included the reinstallation of the statue on April 2, 2024.

== Interior images ==
In 1911, Gisbert Bossard, a 20-year-old German convert to the church, took clandestine photos of the temple. Bossard was described as an expert photographer and film developer, and according to the Salt Lake Tribune, “fell out with the church authorities and secretly took the pictures (of the Salt Lake temple) in a spirit of revenge.” The interior photos were taken around June 1911. These were the earliest known photos of any temple of the church besides Kirtland. To church members, photographing the temple was an act of desecration, and the very thought that anyone could do so was considered as impossible as “profaning the sacred Kaaba at Mecca.”

Bossard cultivated a friendship with assistant temple gardener Gottlieb Wutherich, who had keys to the temple and entered multiple times a day to take care of the flowers inside the Garden Room annex. Once he had access, Bossard took photographs by day and night on multiple occasions. Bossard incorporated a local stock company with Wutherich and Max Florence (a local theatre promoter and entrepreneur), and Bossard and Florence left town. Wutherich was fired mid-July.

While in New York, Florence sent a blackmail letter to church president Joseph F. Smith, saying that an unnamed group had taken 68 negatives of "almost every nook and corner from the basement to the steeples." Florence stated that he and his associates would consider a reasonable business offer, but if the church didn't want the photos suppressed, many other parties were eager to publish them. In response, Smith said: “I will make no bargain with thieves or traffickers in stolen goods. I prefer to let the law deal with them.”

James E. Talmage wrote to the First Presidency about preempting the attempt to sell the photos by publishing a booklet with photographs of the inside of the temple. The church opted for this plan and said that they would distribute the booklet and interior and exterior photos of the temple for free. In January 1912, the church published nine photographs of the temple taken by Ralph Savage, which foreshadowed Talmage’s later book, The House of the Lord. Florence and Bossard attempted to show their photographs in at the Bijou Theatre in New York, but the show ended up being a commercial failure, and caused a significant financial strain for both men, ending their partnership.

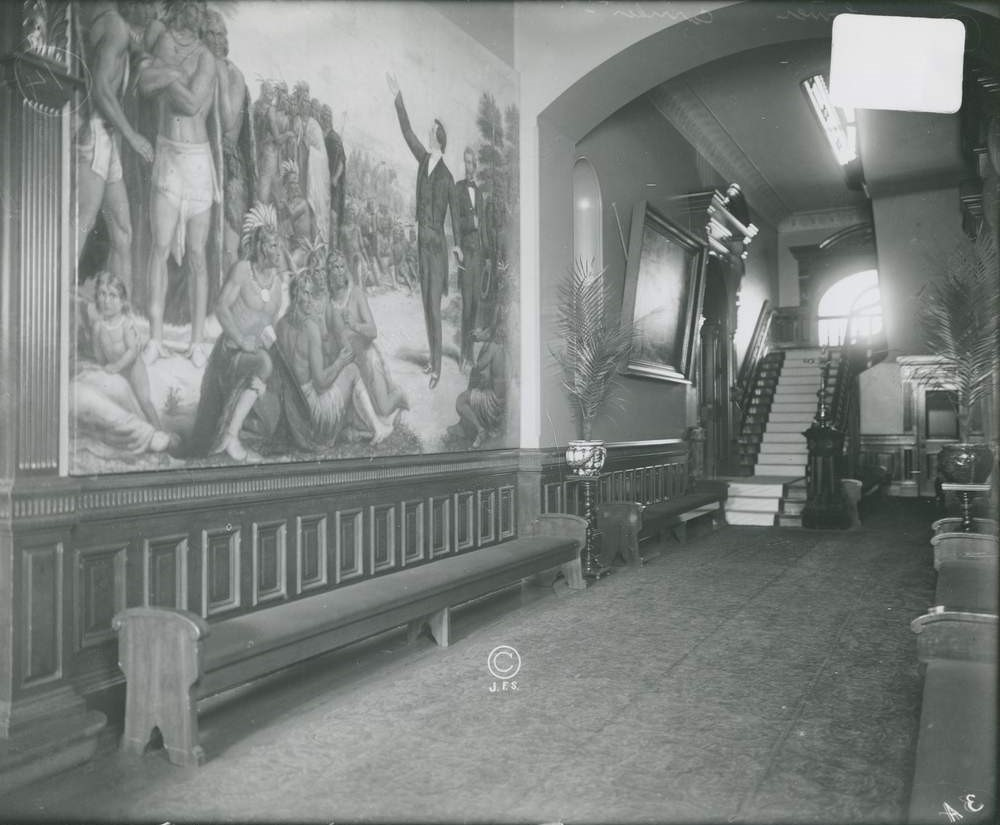
Main floor corridor

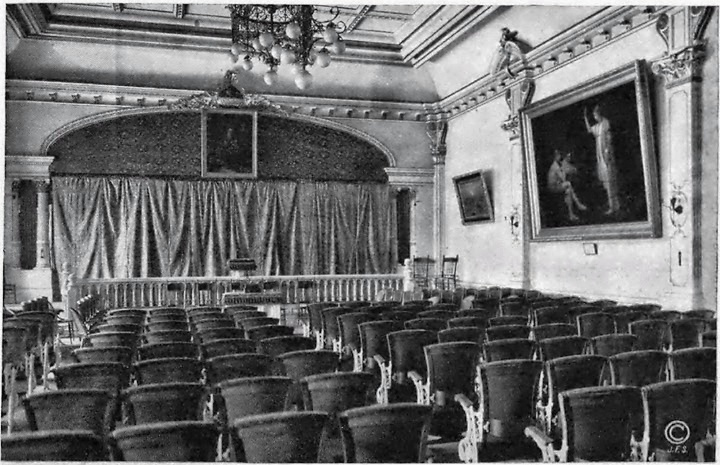
Terrestrial Room and Veil

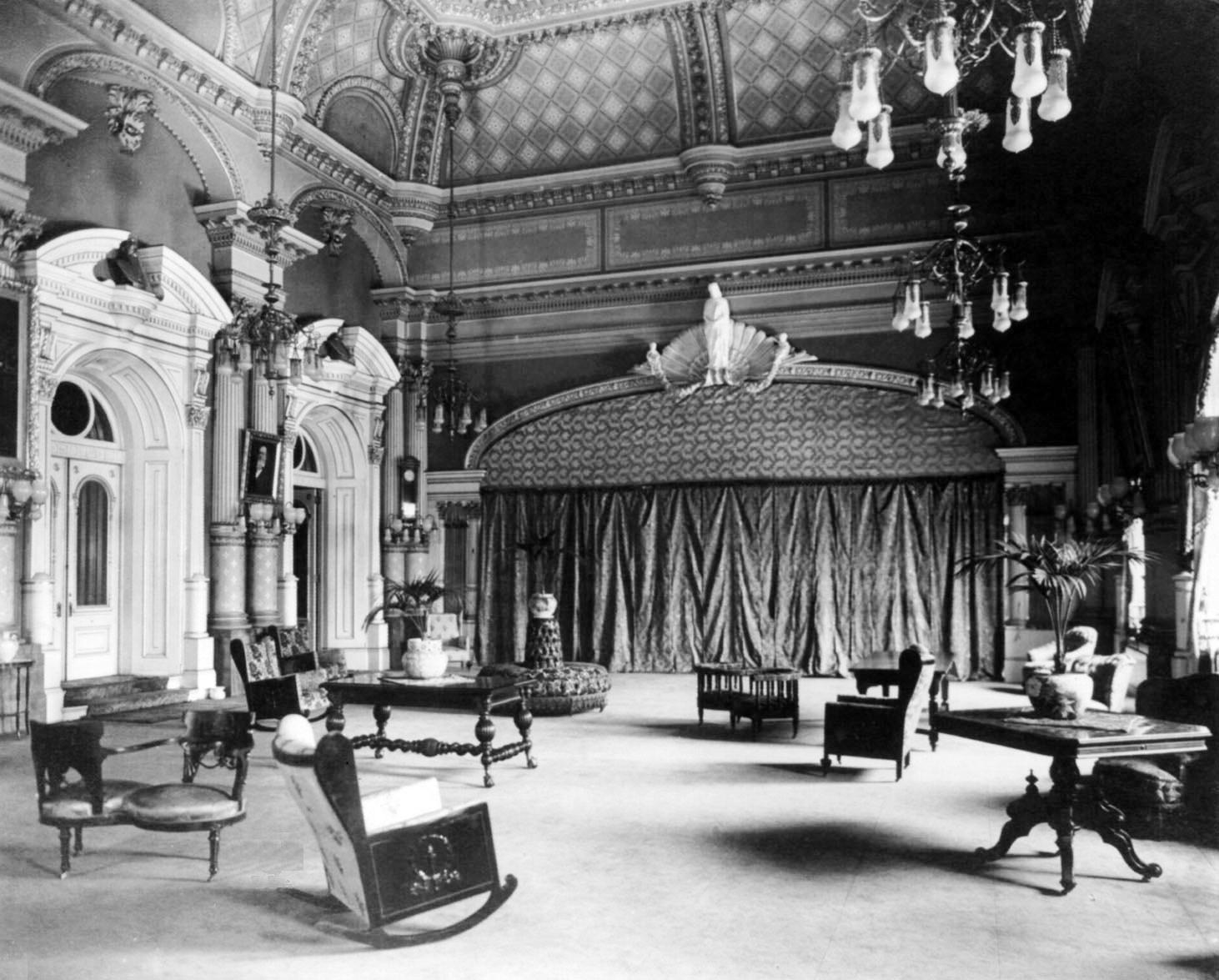
Celestial Room

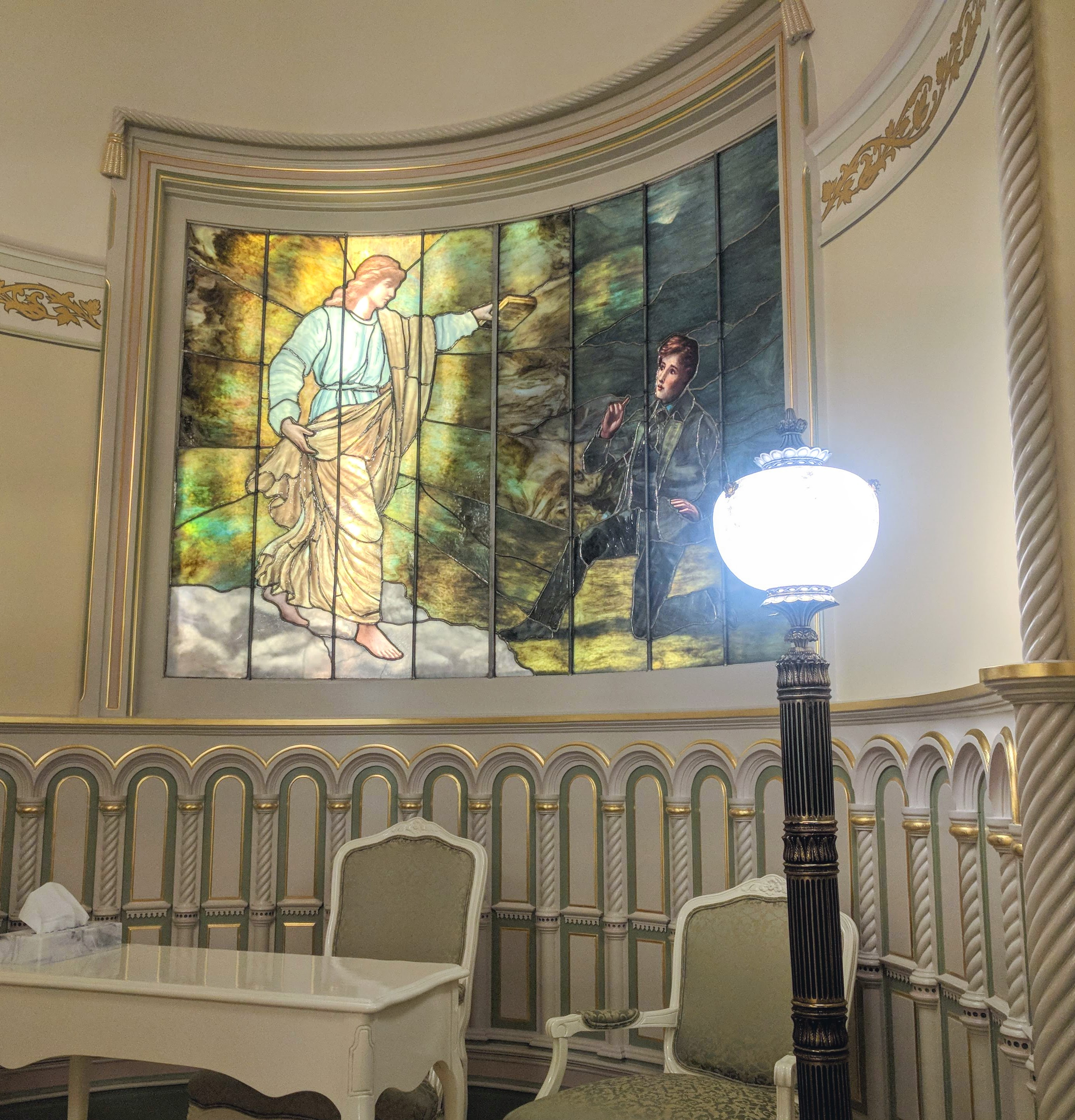
Stained glass art in a sealing room

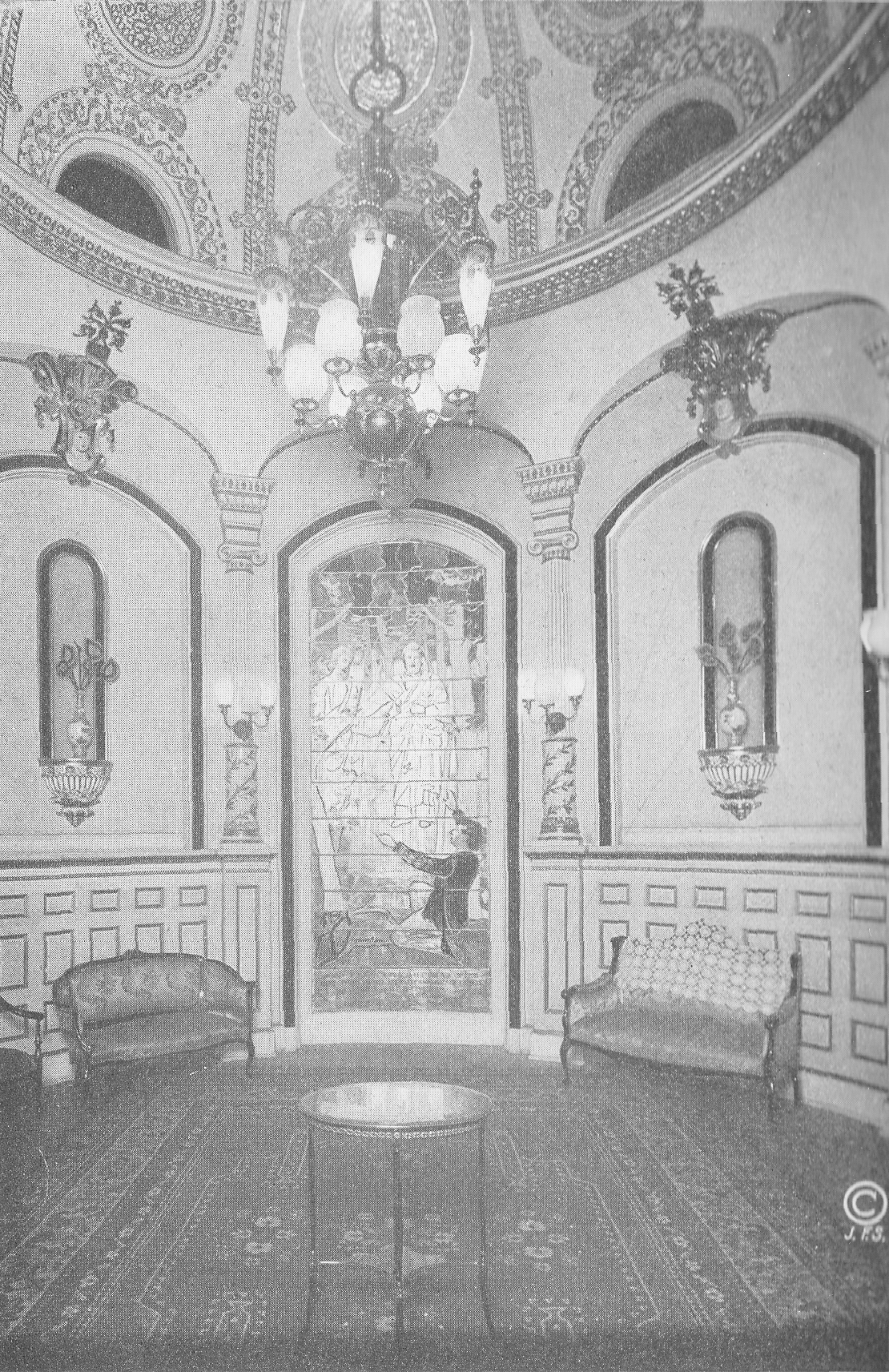
The Holy of Holies

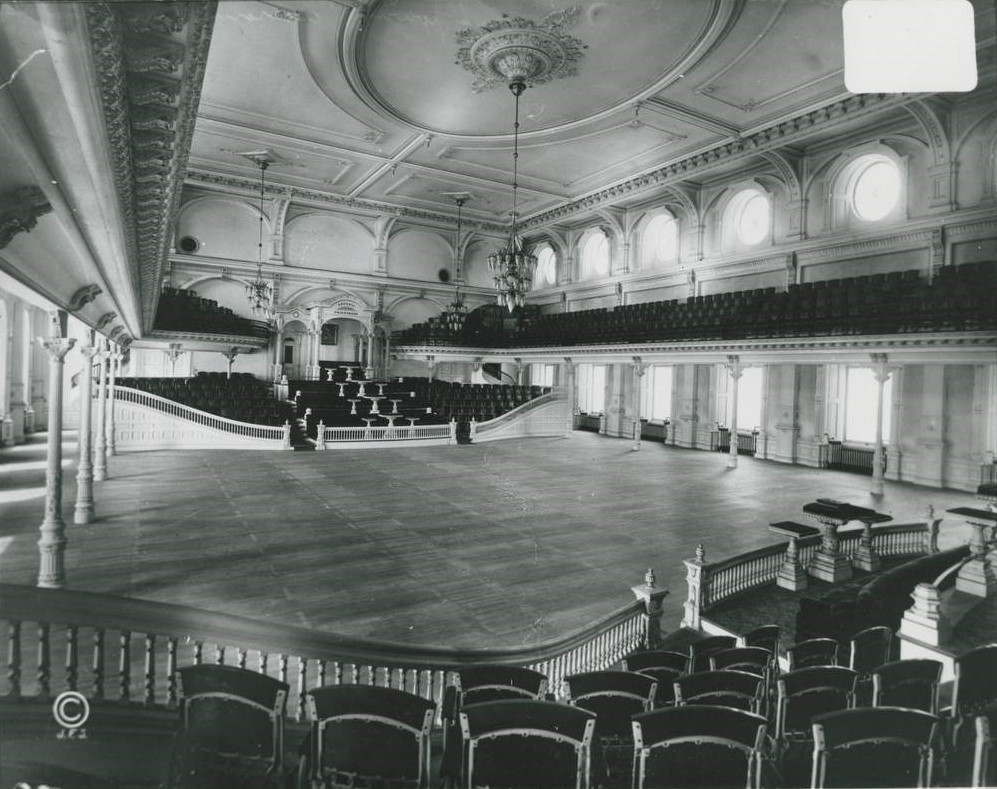
Assembly hall for general authorities

=== Images of former interior elements ===
Below are some elements of the temple have been removed during various renovations of the temple.

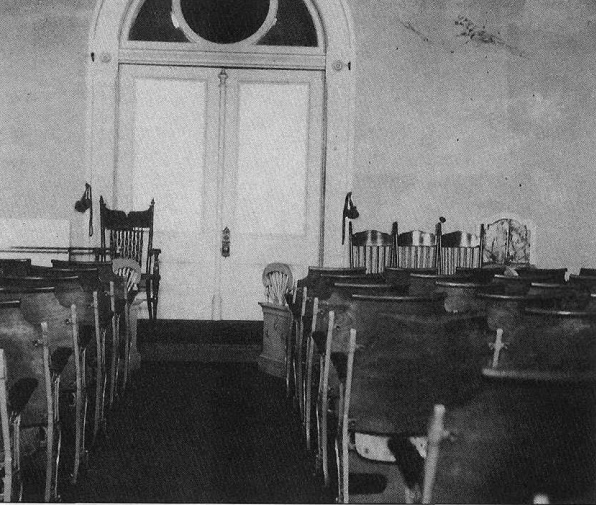
Creation Room (1911)

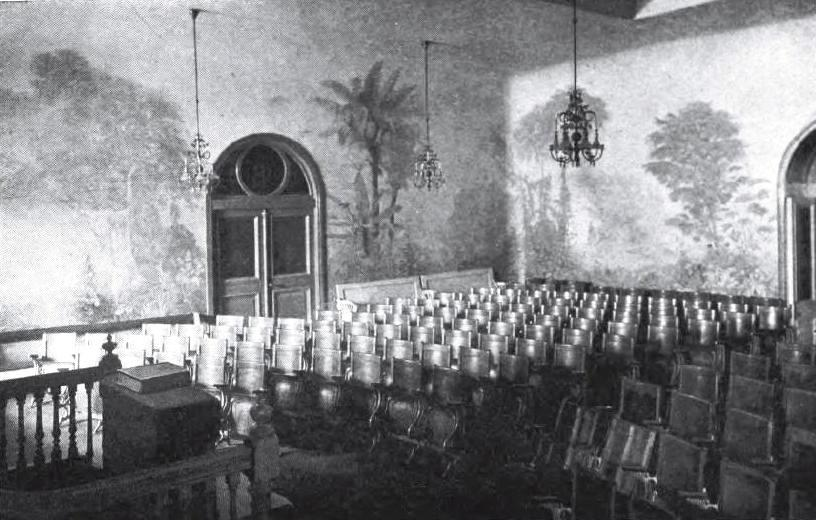
Garden Room (c. 1909)

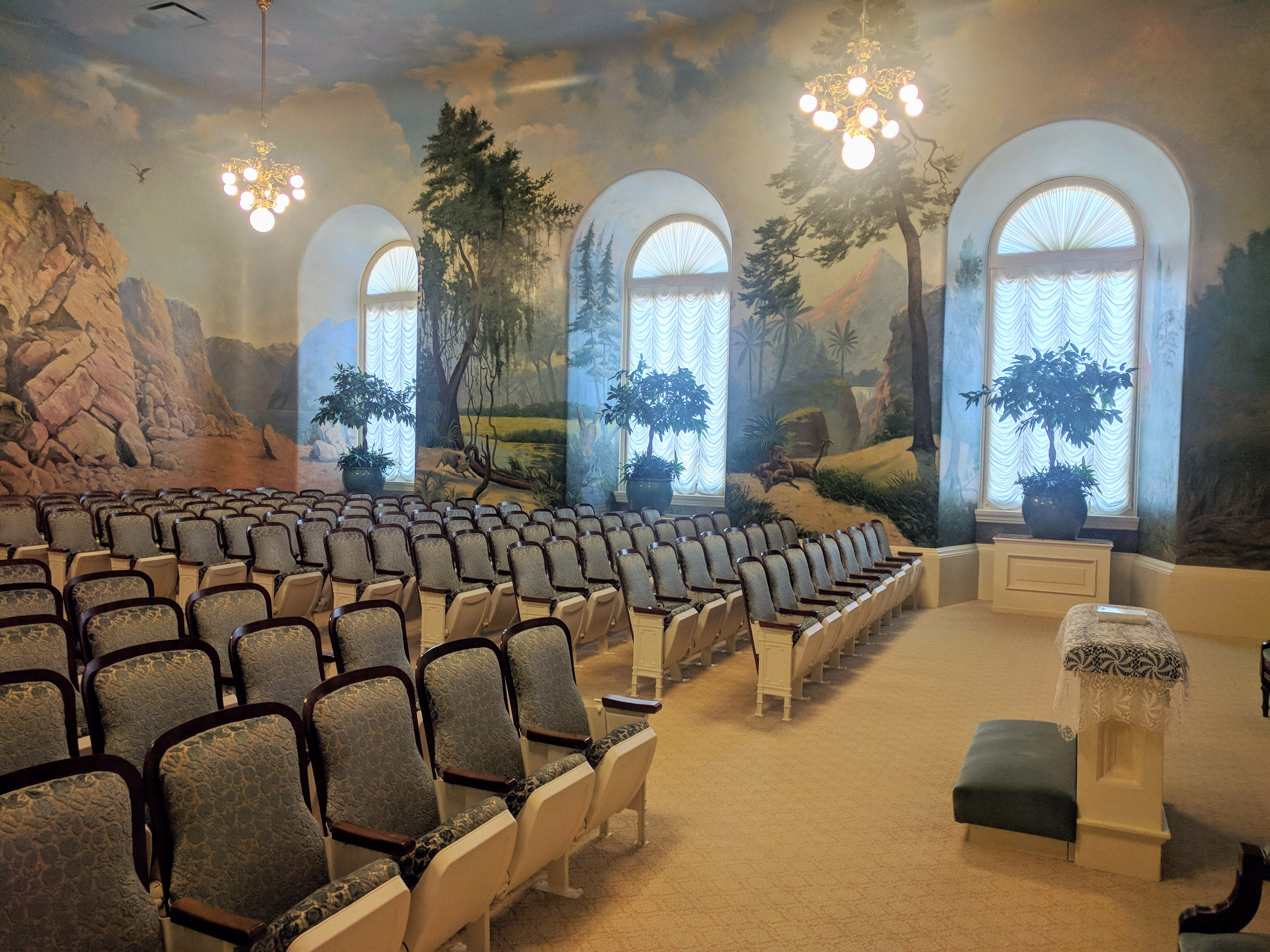
Telestial Room (2015)

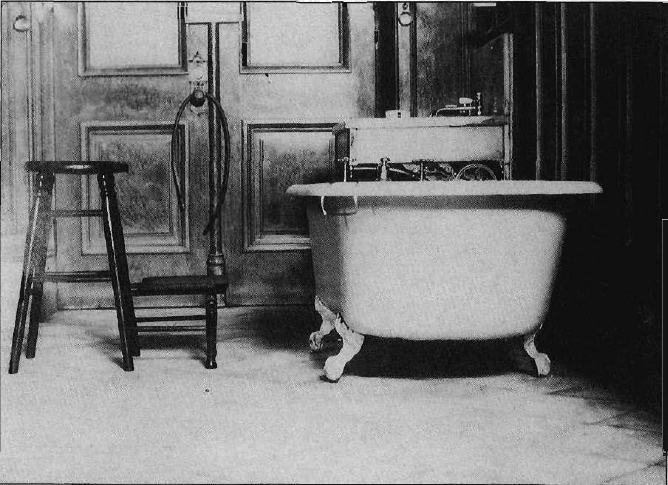
Tub for a literal version of the washing and anointing ceremony used at the time (1911)

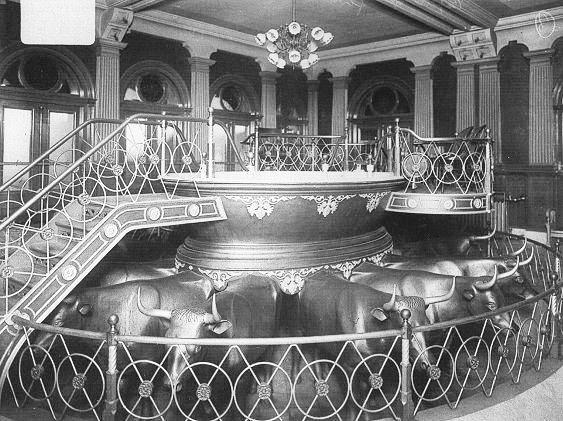
Original baptistry with font for baptisms for the dead (c. 1909)

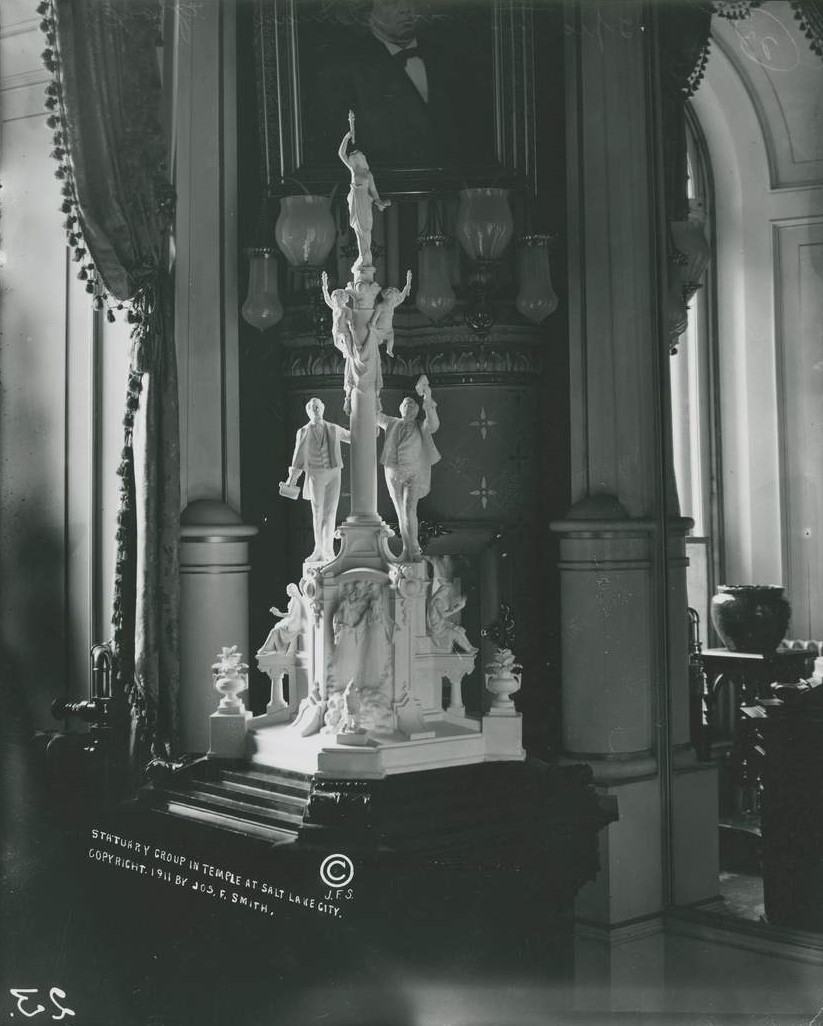
Statuary in the Celestial Room (1911)

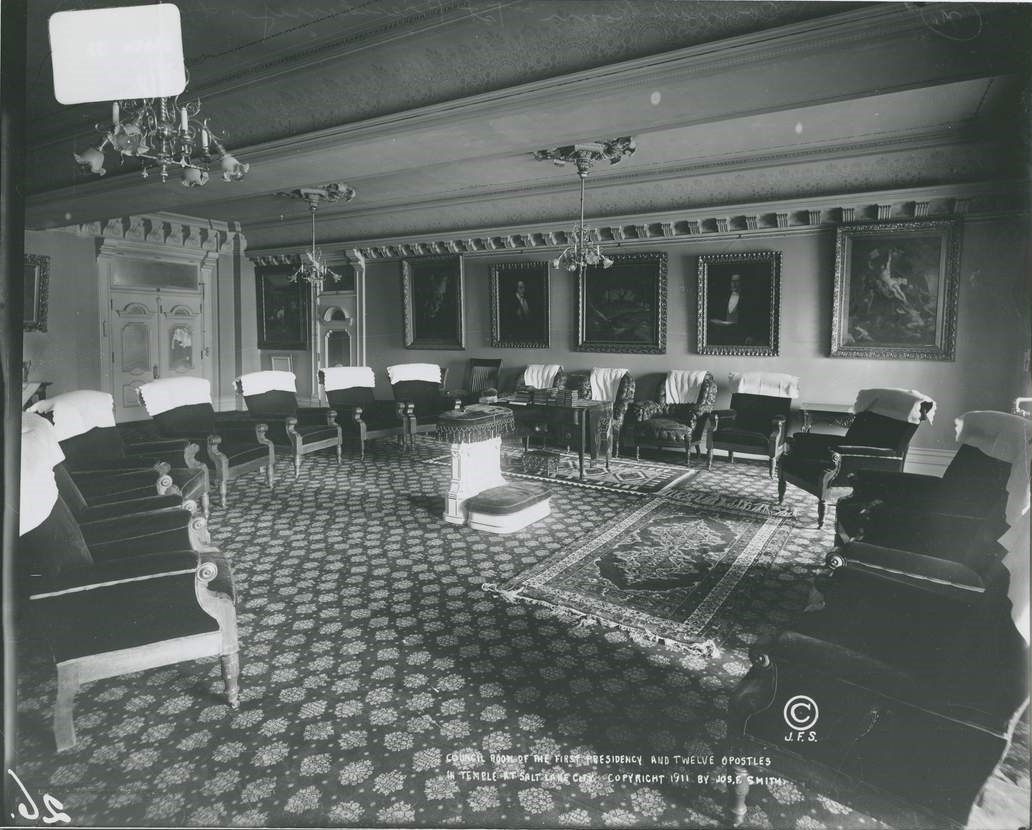
Original council room for the First Presidency and Twelve Apostles

== Temple presidents ==
1. Lorenzo Snow, 1893–1898
2. Joseph F. Smith, 1898–1911
3. Anthon H. Lund, 1911–1921
4. George F. Richards, 1921–1937
5. Stephen L. Chipman, 1937–1945
6. Joseph Fielding Smith, 1945–1949
7. Robert D. Young, 1949–1954
8. ElRay L. Christiansen, 1954–1961
9. Willard R. Smith, 1961–1964
10. Howard S. McDonald, 1964–1968
11. O. Leslie Stone, 1968–1972
12. John K. Edmunds, 1972–1977
13. A. Ray Curtis, 1977–1982
14. Marion D. Hanks, 1982–1985
15. Victor L. Brown, 1985–1987
16. Edgar M. Denny, 1987–1990
17. Spencer H. Osborn, 1990–1993
18. George I. Cannon, 1993–1996
19. Carlos E. Asay, 1996–1999
20. Derrill H. Richards, 1999
21. W. Eugene Hansen, 1999–2002
22. L. Aldin Porter, 2002–2005
23. M. Richard Walker, 2005–2008
24. Sheldon F. Child, 2008–2011
25. Oren Claron Alldredge Jr., 2011–2014
26. Cecil O. Samuelson, 2014–2017
27. B. Jackson Wixom, 2017–2019

== See also ==
Temples in Utah
Wasatch Front Temples
Temples along the Wasatch Front
- = Operating
- = Under construction
- = Announced
- = Temporarily Closed

- Comparison of temples (LDS Church)
- List of temples (LDS Church)
- List of temples by geographic region (LDS Church)
- Temple architecture (LDS Church)
- The Church of Jesus Christ of Latter-day Saints in Utah
- The Mountain of the Lord
