= List of members of the Quorum of the Twelve Apostles (LDS Church) =

In the Church of Jesus Christ of Latter-day Saints (LDS Church), the Quorum of the Twelve Apostles (also known as the Quorum of the Twelve, the Council of the Twelve Apostles, or simply the Twelve) is one of the governing bodies in the church hierarchy. The quorum was first organized in 1835 and designated as a body of "traveling councilors".

== List notes ==
Those shown below are the current and previous members of the LDS Church's Quorum of the Twelve Apostles.

This list only includes individuals who have served in the Quorum. The list is organized by current Quorum members, original Quorum members, then by date of appointment to the Quorum, and then by last name. Members of the First Presidency, which include the President of the Church and his counselors, are usually not part of the Quorum, and a calling to the First Presidency usually entails leaving the Quorum. Exceptions to this rule are noted. It is also possible to be ordained to the priesthood office of Apostle without automatic membership in the Quorum of the Twelve, or to serve in the First Presidency without having been ordained an Apostle. Such individuals who never became members of the Quorum do not appear in the last section of this page.

The begin and end dates represent when an individual first joined (typically corresponding to an ordination date) and last belonged to the Quorum. Strictly speaking, members of the First Presidency rejoin the Quorum temporarily when a Church President dies, and before a successor is named. For simplicity, this list does not consider these periods in determining the end date. On occasion, a quorum member has left the Quorum for a time and later rejoined it; this is noted where applicable.

Additional positions held appears with each member, including, Counselor in the First Presidency ("First Counselor," etc.), President of the Quorum of the Twelve Apostles ("Quorum President"), Acting President of the Quorum of the Twelve Apostles ("Acting Quorum President"), President of The Church of Jesus Christ of Latter-day Saints ("Church President"), and Assistant to the Quorum of the Twelve. A Quorum President is not a member of the Quorum if he is serving in the First Presidency. In those circumstances, an Acting President is typically called, as noted.

== Current Quorum of the Twelve Apostles ==
Name:	Dieter F. Uchtdorf
Born:	November 6, 1940 (age 85)
Positions:	Acting President of the Quorum of the Twelve Apostles, called by Dallin H. Oaks, January 8, 2026 – present Quorum of the Twelve Apostles, January 2, 2018 – present Second Counselor in the First Presidency, called by Thomas S. Monson, February 3, 2008 – January 2, 2018; Quorum of the Twelve Apostles, called by Gordon B. Hinckley, October 2, 2004 – February 3, 2008; LDS Church Apostle, called by Gordon B. Hinckley, October 7, 2004; Presidency of the Seventy, called by Gordon B. Hinckley, August 15, 2002 – October 2, 2004; First Quorum of the Seventy, called by Gordon B. Hinckley, April 7, 1996 – October 2, 2004; Second Quorum of the Seventy, called by Ezra Taft Benson, April 2, 1994 – April 7, 1996
Notes:	The eleventh apostle born outside the United States.
Name:	David A. Bednar
Born:	June 15, 1952 (age 73)
Positions:	Quorum of the Twelve Apostles, called by Gordon B. Hinckley, October 2, 2004; LDS Church Apostle, called by Gordon B. Hinckley, October 7, 2004
Notes:	Final president of Ricks College and first president of Brigham Young University–Idaho.
Name:	Quentin L. Cook
Born:	September 8, 1940 (age 85)
Positions:	Quorum of the Twelve Apostles, called by Gordon B. Hinckley, October 6, 2007; LDS Church Apostle, called by Gordon B. Hinckley, October 11, 2007; Presidency of the Seventy, called by Gordon B. Hinckley, August 1, 2007 – October 6, 2007; First Quorum of the Seventy, called by Gordon B. Hinckley, April 5, 1998 – October 6, 2007; Second Quorum of the Seventy, called by Gordon B. Hinckley, April 6, 1996 – April 5, 1998
Name:	Neil L. Andersen
Born:	August 9, 1951 (age 74)
Positions:	Quorum of the Twelve Apostles, called by Thomas S. Monson, April 4, 2009; LDS Church Apostle, called by Thomas S. Monson, April 9, 2009; Presidency of the Seventy, called by Gordon B. Hinckley, August 15, 2005 – April 4, 2009; First Quorum of the Seventy, called by Ezra Taft Benson, April 3, 1993 – April 4, 2009
Name:	Ronald A. Rasband
Born:	February 6, 1951 (age 75)
Positions:	Quorum of the Twelve Apostles, called by Thomas S. Monson, October 3, 2015; LDS Church Apostle, called by Thomas S. Monson, October 8, 2015; Presidency of the Seventy, called by Gordon B. Hinckley, August 15, 2005 – October 3, 2015; First Quorum of the Seventy, called by Gordon B. Hinckley, April 1, 2000 – October 3, 2015
Name:	Gary E. Stevenson
Born:	August 6, 1955 (age 70)
Positions:	Quorum of the Twelve Apostles, called by Thomas S. Monson, October 3, 2015; LDS Church Apostle, called by Thomas S. Monson, October 8, 2015; Presiding Bishop, called by Thomas S. Monson, March 31, 2012 – October 9, 2015; First Quorum of the Seventy, called by Thomas S. Monson, April 5, 2008 – March 31, 2012
Name:	Dale G. Renlund
Born:	November 13, 1952 (age 73)
Positions:	Quorum of the Twelve Apostles, called by Thomas S. Monson, October 3, 2015; LDS Church Apostle, called by Thomas S. Monson, October 8, 2015; First Quorum of the Seventy, called by Thomas S. Monson, April 4, 2009 – October 3, 2015
Name:	Gerrit W. Gong
Born:	December 23, 1953 (age 72)
Positions:	Quorum of the Twelve Apostles, called by Russell M. Nelson, March 31, 2018; LDS Church Apostle, called by Russell M. Nelson, April 5, 2018; Presidency of the Seventy, called by Thomas S. Monson, October 6, 2015 – March 31, 2018; First Quorum of the Seventy, called by Thomas S. Monson, April 3, 2010 – March 31, 2018
Name:	Ulisses Soares
Born:	October 2, 1958 (age 67)
Positions:	Quorum of the Twelve Apostles, called by Russell M. Nelson, March 31, 2018; LDS Church Apostle, called by Russell M. Nelson, April 5, 2018; Presidency of the Seventy, called by Thomas S. Monson, January 6, 2013 – March 31, 2018; First Quorum of the Seventy, called by Gordon B. Hinckley, April 2, 2005 – March 31, 2018
Notes:	The twelfth apostle born outside the United States and the first born in South America (Brazil).
Name:	Patrick Kearon
Born:	July 18, 1961 (age 64)
Positions:	Quorum of the Twelve Apostles, called by Russell M. Nelson, December 7, 2023; LDS Church Apostle, called by Russell M. Nelson, December 7, 2023; Presidency of the Seventy, called by Thomas S. Monson, August 2017 – December 7, 2023; First Quorum of the Seventy, called by Thomas S. Monson, April 3, 2010 – December 7, 2023
Notes:	The thirteenth apostle born outside the United States (U.K.).
Name:	Gérald Caussé
Born:	May 20, 1963 (age 62)
Positions:	Quorum of the Twelve Apostles, called by Dallin H. Oaks, November 6, 2025; LDS Church Apostle, called by Dallin H. Oaks, November 6, 2025; Presiding Bishop, called by Thomas S. Monson, October 9, 2015; First Counselor in the Presiding Bishopric, called by Gary E. Stevenson, March 31, 2012 – October 9, 2015; First Quorum of the Seventy, called by Thomas S. Monson, April 5, 2008 – March 31, 2012
Notes:	The fourteenth apostle born outside the United States and the first born in France.
Name:	Clark G. Gilbert
Born:	June 18, 1970 (age 55)
Positions:	Quorum of the Twelve Apostles, called by Dallin H. Oaks, February 12, 2026; LDS Church Apostle, called by Dallin H. Oaks, February 12, 2026; General Authority Seventy, called by Russell M. Nelson, April 3, 2021 – February 12, 2026

== Members of the original Quorum of the Twelve Apostles ==
Name:	Thomas B. Marsh
Born:	November 1, 1800
Died:	January 1866 (aged 65)
Positions:	President of the Quorum of the Twelve Apostles, April 25, 1835 – March 17, 1839; Quorum of the Twelve Apostles, called by Three Witnesses, April 25, 1835 – March 17, 1839; Latter Day Saint Apostle, called by Three Witnesses, April 25, 1835 – March 17, 1839
Notes:	Was excommunicated for apostasy March 17, 1839, and was rebaptized on July 16, 1857.
Name:	David W. Patten
Born:	November 14, 1799
Died:	October 25, 1838 (aged 38)
Positions:	Quorum of the Twelve Apostles, called by Three Witnesses, February 15, 1835 – October 25, 1838; Latter Day Saint Apostle, called by Three Witnesses, February 15, 1835 – October 25, 1838
Notes:	Killed in the Battle of Crooked River.
Name:	Brigham Young
Born:	June 1, 1801
Died:	August 29, 1877 (aged 76)
Positions:	2nd President of the Church of Jesus Christ of Latter-day Saints, December 27, 1847 – August 29, 1877; President of the Quorum of the Twelve Apostles, April 14, 1840 – December 27, 1847; Quorum of the Twelve Apostles, called by Three Witnesses, February 14, 1835 – December 27, 1847; LDS Church Apostle, called by Three Witnesses, February 14, 1835 – August 29, 1877
Notes:	Succeeded Smith as leader of the LDS Church. Was also Governor of Utah Territory from February 3, 1851, to April 12, 1858.
Name:	Heber C. Kimball
Born:	June 14, 1801
Died:	June 22, 1868 (aged 67)
Positions:	First Counselor in the First Presidency, called by Brigham Young, December 27, 1847 – June 22, 1868; Quorum of the Twelve Apostles, called by Three Witnesses, February 14, 1835 – December 27, 1847; LDS Church Apostle, called by Three Witnesses, February 14, 1835 – June 22, 1868
Name:	Orson Hyde
Born:	January 8, 1805
Died:	November 28, 1878 (aged 73)
Positions:	President of the Quorum of the Twelve Apostles, December 27, 1847 – April 10, 1875; Quorum of the Twelve Apostles, June 27, 1839 – November 28, 1878; Quorum of the Twelve Apostles, called by Three Witnesses, February 15, 1835 – May 4, 1839; LDS Church Apostle, called by Three Witnesses, February 15, 1835 – November 28, 1878
Notes:	Was removed from the Quorum due to apostasy May 4, 1839, but readmitted June 27, 1839. As a result, was given reduced seniority on April 10, 1875.
Name:	William E. McLellin
Born:	January 18, 1806
Died:	March 14, 1883 (aged 77)
Positions:	Quorum of the Twelve Apostles, called by Three Witnesses, February 15, 1835 – May 11, 1838; Latter Day Saint Apostle, called by Three Witnesses, February 15, 1835 – May 11, 1838
Notes:	Excommunicated for apostasy in 1838.
Name:	Parley P. Pratt
Born:	April 12, 1807
Died:	May 13, 1857 (aged 50)
Positions:	Quorum of the Twelve Apostles, called by Three Witnesses, February 21, 1835 – May 13, 1857; LDS Church Apostle, called by Three Witnesses, February 21, 1835 – May 13, 1857
Notes:	In 1857, on a farm northeast of Van Buren, Arkansas, Pratt was murdered by Hector McLean, the legal husband of one of Pratt's plural wives. Pratt is buried near Alma, Arkansas.
Name:	Luke Johnson
Born:	November 3, 1807
Died:	December 9, 1861 (aged 54)
Positions:	Quorum of the Twelve Apostles, called by Three Witnesses, February 15, 1835 – September 3, 1837; Latter Day Saint Apostle, called by Three Witnesses, February 15, 1835 – December 31, 1837
Notes:	Was excommunicated for apostasy April 13, 1838, and later rebaptized in 1846.
Name:	William Smith
Born:	March 13, 1811
Died:	November 13, 1893 (aged 82)
Positions:	Petitioner for Patriarchate (RLDS Church), called by Joseph Smith III, April 6, 1872 – November 13, 1893; 3rd Presiding Patriarch (LDS Church), May 24, 1845 – October 6, 1845; Quorum of the Twelve Apostles, May 25, 1839 – October 6, 1845; Quorum of the Twelve Apostles, called by Three Witnesses, February 15, 1835 – May 4, 1839; Latter Day Saint Apostle, called by Joseph Smith, February 15, 1835 – October 6, 1845
Notes:	Brother of Joseph Smith. Was removed from the Quorum due to apostasy May 4, 1839, but readmitted May 25, 1839. Was then excommunicated for apostasy on October 6, 1845. Followed James J. Strang for a time, then started his own LDS Church in Covington, Kentucky. In later years he joined the RLDS Church (now Community of Christ) and was a petitioner for RLDS Patriarchate from April 1872 to November 13, 1893.
Name:	Orson Pratt
Born:	September 19, 1811
Died:	October 3, 1881 (aged 70)
Positions:	Quorum of the Twelve Apostles, January 20, 1843 – October 3, 1881; Quorum of the Twelve Apostles, called by Three Witnesses, April 26, 1835 – August 20, 1842; LDS Church Apostle, called by Three Witnesses, April 26, 1835
Notes:	Younger brother of Parley P. Pratt. Was excommunicated for apostasy August 20, 1842, but readmitted January 20, 1843. As a result, was given reduced seniority in June 1875. Last surviving member of the original Quorum. Under the direction of Brigham Young, he published The Seer.
Name:	John F. Boynton
Born:	September 20, 1811
Died:	October 20, 1890 (aged 79)
Positions:	Quorum of the Twelve Apostles, called by Three Witnesses, February 15, 1835 – September 3, 1837; Latter Day Saint Apostle, called by Three Witnesses, February 15, 1835 – December 3, 1837
Notes:	Was excommunicated for apostasy in 1837.
Name:	Lyman E. Johnson
Born:	October 24, 1811
Died:	December 20, 1859 (aged 48)
Positions:	Quorum of the Twelve Apostles, called by Three Witnesses, February 14, 1835 – September 3, 1837; Latter Day Saint Apostle, called by Three Witnesses, February 14, 1835 – April 13, 1838
Notes:	Excommunicated in 1838 for apostasy.

== 19th century ==
Name:	John E. Page
Born:	February 25, 1799
Died:	October 14, 1867 (aged 68)
Positions:	Quorum of the Twelve Apostles, called by Joseph Smith, December 19, 1838 – February 9, 1846; Latter Day Saint Apostle, called by Joseph Smith, December 19, 1838 – June 27, 1846
Notes:	Excommunicated for apostasy on June 27, 1846.
Name:	John Taylor
Born:	November 1, 1808
Died:	July 25, 1887 (aged 78)
Positions:	3rd President of the Church of Jesus Christ of Latter-day Saints, October 10, 1880 – July 25, 1887; President of the Quorum of the Twelve Apostles, April 10, 1875 – October 10, 1880; Quorum of the Twelve Apostles, called by Joseph Smith, December 19, 1838 – October 10, 1880; LDS Church Apostle, called by Joseph Smith, December 19, 1838 – July 25, 1887
Notes:	Was promoted to Quorum President when Orson Hyde was given reduced seniority.
Name:	Wilford Woodruff
Born:	March 1, 1807
Died:	September 2, 1898 (aged 91)
Positions:	4th President of the Church of Jesus Christ of Latter-day Saints, April 7, 1889 – September 2, 1898; President of the Quorum of the Twelve Apostles, October 10, 1880 – April 7, 1889; Quorum of the Twelve Apostles, called by Joseph Smith, April 26, 1839 – April 7, 1889; Apostle, called by Joseph Smith, April 26, 1839 – September 2, 1898
Notes:	Became Quorum President because Orson Pratt was given reduced seniority.
Name:	George A. Smith
Born:	June 26, 1817
Died:	September 1, 1875 (aged 58)
Positions:	First Counselor in the First Presidency, called by Brigham Young, October 7, 1868 – September 1, 1875; Quorum of the Twelve Apostles, called by Joseph Smith, April 26, 1839 – October 7, 1868; LDS Church Apostle, called by Joseph Smith, April 26, 1839 – September 1, 1875
Notes:	Cousin of Joseph Smith. During The Utah War, Smith visited southern Utah communities, after learning of the imminent arrival of U.S. troops into Utah Territory. Scholars have asserted that Smith's tour, speeches, and personal actions may have contributed to the fear and tension in these communities, which led to the Mountain Meadows massacre. George A. Smith's grandson, George Albert Smith, became president of the church in 1945.
Name:	Willard Richards
Born:	June 24, 1804
Died:	March 11, 1854 (aged 49)
Positions:	Second Counselor in the First Presidency, called by Brigham Young, December 27, 1847 – March 11, 1854; Quorum of the Twelve Apostles, called by Joseph Smith, April 14, 1840 – December 27, 1847; LDS Church Apostle, called by Joseph Smith, April 14, 1840 – March 11, 1854
Notes:	Richards was incarcerated in Carthage Jail with Joseph Smith, Hyrum Smith and John Taylor on June 27, 1844, when the jail was attacked by a mob and the Smith brothers were murdered.
Name:	Lyman Wight
Born:	May 9, 1796
Died:	March 31, 1858 (aged 61)
Positions:	President of the Church of Christ, 1844 – 1858; Quorum of the Twelve Apostles, called by Joseph Smith, April 8, 1841 – December 3, 1848; Latter Day Saint Apostle, called by Joseph Smith, April 8, 1841 – December 3, 1848
Notes:	After the death of Joseph Smith, Wight felt compelled to follow the orders Joseph Smith had given him to found a safe haven for the Latter-day Saints in the Republic of Texas. Brigham Young tried to get Wight and his group to join the main body of Mormonism, in Utah, several times, but Wight refused each time. Wight was eventually excommunicated in December 1848.
Name:	Amasa Lyman
Born:	March 30, 1813
Died:	February 4, 1877 (aged 63)
Positions:	Quorum of the Twelve Apostles, October 6, 1845 – October 6, 1867; Counselor in the First Presidency, called by Joseph Smith, February 4, 1843 – June 27, 1844; Quorum of the Twelve Apostles, called by Joseph Smith, August 20, 1842 – January 20, 1843; Latter Day Saint Apostle, called by Joseph Smith, August 20, 1842 – October 6, 1867
Notes:	Was temporarily removed from the Quorum of the Twelve due to the re-entry of Orson Pratt on January 20, 1843; Lyman was later readmitted on August 12, 1844. Lyman was excommunicated for apostasy on May 6, 1867.
Name:	Ezra T. Benson
Born:	February 22, 1811
Died:	September 3, 1869 (aged 58)
Positions:	Quorum of the Twelve Apostles, called by Brigham Young, July 16, 1846 – September 3, 1869; LDS Church Apostle, called by Brigham Young, July 16, 1846 – September 3, 1869
Notes:	Great-grandfather of the thirteenth president of the LDS church, Ezra Taft Benson
Name:	Charles C. Rich
Born:	August 21, 1809
Died:	November 17, 1883 (aged 74)
Positions:	Quorum of the Twelve Apostles, called by Brigham Young, February 12, 1849 – November 17, 1883; LDS Church Apostle, called by Brigham Young, February 12, 1849 – November 17, 1883
Notes:	Was also a member of the Council of Fifty.
Name:	Lorenzo Snow
Born:	April 3, 1814
Died:	October 10, 1901 (aged 87)
Positions:	5th President of the Church of Jesus Christ of Latter-day Saints, September 13, 1898 – October 10, 1901; President of the Quorum of the Twelve Apostles, April 7, 1889 – September 13, 1898; Quorum of the Twelve Apostles, August 29, 1877 – September 13, 1898; Assistant Counselor in the First Presidency, called by Brigham Young, May 9, 1874 – August 29, 1877; Counselor in the First Presidency, called by Brigham Young, June 8, 1873 – May 9, 1874; Quorum of the Twelve Apostles, called by Brigham Young, February 12, 1849 – June 8, 1873; LDS Church Apostle, called by Brigham Young, February 12, 1849 – October 10, 1901
Notes:	Brother-in-law of both Joseph Smith and Brigham Young through Eliza R. Snow.
Name:	Erastus Snow
Born:	November 9, 1818
Died:	May 27, 1888 (aged 69)
Positions:	Quorum of the Twelve Apostles, called by Brigham Young, February 12, 1849 – May 27, 1888; LDS Church Apostle, called by Brigham Young, February 12, 1849 – May 27, 1888
Notes:	Was also a member of the Council of Fifty
Name:	Franklin D. Richards I
Born:	April 2, 1821
Died:	December 9, 1899 (aged 78)
Positions:	President of the Quorum of the Twelve Apostles, September 13, 1898 – December 9, 1899; Quorum of the Twelve Apostles, called by Brigham Young, February 12, 1849 – December 9, 1899; LDS Church Apostle, called by Brigham Young, February 12, 1849 – December 9, 1899
Name:	George Q. Cannon
Born:	January 11, 1827
Died:	April 12, 1901 (aged 74)
Positions:	First Counselor in the First Presidency, called by Lorenzo Snow, September 13, 1898 – April 12, 1901; First Counselor in the First Presidency, called by Wilford Woodruff, April 7, 1889 – September 2, 1898; Quorum of the Twelve Apostles, July 25, 1887 – April 7, 1889; First Counselor in the First Presidency, called by John Taylor, October 10, 1880 – July 25, 1887; Quorum of the Twelve Apostles, August 29, 1877 – October 10, 1880; Assistant Counselor in the First Presidency, called by Brigham Young, May 9, 1874 – August 29, 1877; Counselor in the First Presidency, called by Brigham Young, June 8, 1873 – May 9, 1874; Quorum of the Twelve Apostles, called by Brigham Young, August 26, 1860 – June 8, 1873; LDS Church Apostle, called by Brigham Young, August 26, 1860 – April 12, 1901
Notes:	Convicted of unlawful cohabitation in 1886 and imprisoned for six months.
Name:	Joseph F. Smith
Born:	November 13, 1838
Died:	November 19, 1918 (aged 80)
Positions:	6th President of the Church of Jesus Christ of Latter-day Saints, October 17, 1901 – November 19, 1918; President of the Quorum of the Twelve Apostles, October 10, 1901 – October 17, 1901; First Counselor in the First Presidency, called by Lorenzo Snow, October 6, 1901 – October 10, 1901; Second Counselor in the First Presidency, called by Wilford Woodruff, April 7, 1889 – October 6, 1901; Quorum of the Twelve Apostles, July 25, 1887 – April 7, 1889; Second Counselor in the First Presidency, called by John Taylor, October 10, 1880 – July 25, 1887; Quorum of the Twelve Apostles, August 29, 1877 – October 10, 1880; Counselor in the First Presidency, called by Brigham Young, July 1, 1866 – August 29, 1877; LDS Church Apostle, called by Brigham Young, July 1, 1866 – November 19, 1918
Notes:	Son of Hyrum Smith, and nephew of Joseph Smith
Name:	Brigham Young Jr.
Born:	December 18, 1836
Died:	April 11, 1903 (aged 66)
Positions:	President of the Quorum of the Twelve Apostles, October 17, 1901 – April 11, 1903; Quorum of the Twelve Apostles, August 29, 1877 – April 11, 1903; Assistant Counselor in the First Presidency, called by Brigham Young, May 9, 1874 – August 29, 1877; Counselor in the First Presidency, called by Brigham Young, June 8, 1873 – May 9, 1874; Quorum of the Twelve Apostles, called by Brigham Young, October 9, 1868 – June 8, 1873; LDS Church Apostle, called by Brigham Young, February 4, 1864 – April 11, 1903
Notes:	Son of Brigham Young. Was ordained an apostle in 1864, but did not become member of the Quorum until 1868. Also served several terms in the Utah Territorial Legislature.
Name:	Albert Carrington
Born:	January 8, 1813
Died:	September 19, 1889 (aged 76)
Positions:	Quorum of the Twelve Apostles, August 29, 1877 – November 7, 1885; Assistant Counselor in the First Presidency, called by Brigham Young, May 9, 1874 – August 29, 1877; Counselor in the First Presidency, called by Brigham Young, June 8, 1873 – May 9, 1874; Quorum of the Twelve Apostles, called by Brigham Young, July 3, 1870 – June 8, 1873; LDS Church Apostle, called by Brigham Young, July 3, 1870 – November 7, 1885
Notes:	Also served as an official Church Historian (1871–1874), as a member of the Council of Fifty and in the Utah Territorial Legislature (1869). Was excommunicated for adultery November 7, 1885, and later rebaptized on November 1, 1887; however, he was not reinstated as an apostle or as a general authority.
Name:	Moses Thatcher
Born:	February 2, 1842
Died:	August 21, 1909 (aged 67)
Positions:	Quorum of the Twelve Apostles, called by John Taylor, April 9, 1879 – April 6, 1896; LDS Church Apostle, called by John Taylor, April 9, 1879 – August 21, 1909
Notes:	Also a member of the Council of Fifty. At the April 1896 General Conference of the church, Thatcher was released from the Quorum of the Twelve; however, Thatcher was not excommunicated from the church and held the priesthood office of Apostle until his death.
Name:	Francis M. Lyman
Born:	January 12, 1840
Died:	November 18, 1916 (aged 76)
Positions:	President of the Quorum of the Twelve Apostles, October 6, 1903 – November 18, 1916; Quorum of the Twelve Apostles, called by John Taylor, October 27, 1880 – November 18, 1916; LDS Church Apostle, called by John Taylor, October 27, 1880 – November 18, 1916
Notes:	Member of the Council of Fifty. Son of Amasa Lyman.
Name:	John Henry Smith
Born:	September 18, 1848
Died:	October 13, 1911 (aged 63)
Positions:	Second Counselor in the First Presidency, called by Joseph F. Smith, April 7, 1910 – October 13, 1911; Quorum of the Twelve Apostles, called by John Taylor, October 27, 1880 – April 7, 1910; LDS Church Apostle, called by John Taylor, October 27, 1880 – October 13, 1911
Notes:	Son of George A. Smith. After being elected a member of the Utah Territorial Legislature in 1882, he played an important role in the process whereby Utah made the transition from a territory to a state of the United States.
Name:	George Teasdale
Born:	December 8, 1831
Died:	June 9, 1907 (aged 75)
Positions:	Quorum of the Twelve Apostles, called by John Taylor, October 16, 1882 – June 9, 1907; LDS Church Apostle, called by John Taylor, October 16, 1882 – June 9, 1907
Notes:	Was also a member of the Council of Fifty.
Name:	Heber J. Grant
Born:	November 22, 1856
Died:	May 14, 1945 (aged 88)
Positions:	7th President of the Church of Jesus Christ of Latter-day Saints, November 23, 1918 – May 14, 1945; President of the Quorum of the Twelve Apostles, November 18, 1916 – November 23, 1918; Quorum of the Twelve Apostles, called by John Taylor, October 16, 1882 – November 23, 1918; LDS Church Apostle, called by John Taylor, October 16, 1882 – May 14, 1945
Notes:	Grant succeeded Joseph F. Smith as president of the LDS Church in November 1918. However, he was not sustained in the position by the general church membership until June 1919, as the influenza pandemic of 1918 forced a delay of the church's traditional springtime general conference.
Name:	John W. Taylor
Born:	May 15, 1858
Died:	October 10, 1916 (aged 58)
Positions:	Quorum of the Twelve Apostles, called by John Taylor, April 9, 1884 – April 1905; LDS Church Apostle, called by John Taylor, April 9, 1884 – March 28, 1911
Notes:	Son of John Taylor. Resigned from the Quorum in October 1905 and was excommunicated in 1911.
Name:	Marriner W. Merrill
Born:	September 25, 1832
Died:	February 6, 1906 (aged 73)
Positions:	Quorum of the Twelve Apostles, called by Wilford Woodruff, October 7, 1889 – February 6, 1906; LDS Church Apostle, called by Wilford Woodruff, October 7, 1889 – February 6, 1906
Notes:	Merrill was also the Postmaster of Richmond in 1866, a County Selectman from 1872 to 1879 and a member of the territorial legislature for two terms.
Name:	Anthon H. Lund
Born:	May 15, 1844
Died:	March 2, 1921 (aged 76)
Positions:	President of the Quorum of the Twelve Apostles (with Rudger Clawson as Acting President), November 23, 1918 – March 2, 1921; First Counselor in the First Presidency, called by Heber J. Grant, November 23, 1918 – March 2, 1921; First Counselor in the First Presidency, called by Joseph F. Smith, April 7, 1910 – November 19, 1918; Second Counselor in the First Presidency, called by Joseph F. Smith, October 17, 1901 – April 7, 1910; Quorum of the Twelve Apostles, called by Wilford Woodruff, October 7, 1889 – October 17, 1901; LDS Church Apostle, called by Wilford Woodruff, October 7, 1889 – March 2, 1921
Notes:	Also served as an official church historian and in the Utah Territorial Legislature. He is credited with starting Utah State University because he introduced the legislation to start it.
Name:	Abraham H. Cannon
Born:	March 12, 1859
Died:	July 19, 1896 (aged 37)
Positions:	Quorum of the Twelve Apostles, called by Wilford Woodruff, October 7, 1889 – July 19, 1896; LDS Church Apostle, called by Wilford Woodruff, October 7, 1889 – July 19, 1896; First Seven Presidents of the Seventy, called by John Taylor, October 8, 1882 – October 7, 1889
Notes:	Was a member of the Council of Fifty. Son of apostle George Q. Cannon.
Name:	Matthias F. Cowley
Born:	August 25, 1858
Died:	June 16, 1940 (aged 81)
Positions:	Quorum of the Twelve Apostles, called by Wilford Woodruff, October 7, 1897 – October 28, 1905; LDS Church Apostle, called by Wilford Woodruff, October 7, 1897 – May 11, 1911
Notes:	The town of Cowley, Wyoming, is named after him. Cowley resigned from the Quorum October 28, 1905. He remained an ordained apostle of the church until his priesthood was suspended in on May 11, 1911, and later restored on April 3, 1936.
Name:	Abraham O. Woodruff
Born:	November 23, 1872
Died:	June 20, 1904 (aged 31)
Positions:	Quorum of the Twelve Apostles, called by Wilford Woodruff, October 7, 1897 – June 20, 1904; LDS Church Apostle, called by Wilford Woodruff, October 7, 1897 – June 20, 1904
Notes:	Son of Wilford Woodruff. He was ordained an apostle at the young age of 23, but served less than 8 years due to his death of smallpox.
Name:	Rudger Clawson
Born:	March 12, 1857
Died:	June 21, 1943 (aged 86)
Positions:	President of the Quorum of the Twelve Apostles, March 17, 1921 – June 21, 1943; Acting President of the Quorum of the Twelve Apostles, November 23, 1918 – March 17, 1921; Quorum of the Twelve Apostles, October 10, 1901 – June 21, 1943; Second Counselor in the First Presidency, called by Lorenzo Snow, October 6, 1901 – October 10, 1901; Quorum of the Twelve Apostles, called by Lorenzo Snow, October 10, 1898 – October 6, 1901; LDS Church Apostle, called by Lorenzo Snow, October 10, 1898 – June 21, 1943
Notes:	Clawson served in the Quorum of the Twelve for 45 years. The town of Clawson, Utah, is named after him.

== 20th century ==
Name:	Reed Smoot
Born:	January 10, 1862
Died:	February 9, 1941 (aged 79)
Positions:	Quorum of the Twelve Apostles, called by Lorenzo Snow, April 8, 1900 – February 9, 1941; LDS Church Apostle, called by Lorenzo Snow, April 8, 1900 – February 9, 1941
Notes:	U.S. Senator from Utah, 1902–32.
Name:	Hyrum M. Smith
Born:	March 21, 1872
Died:	January 23, 1918 (aged 45)
Positions:	Quorum of the Twelve Apostles, called by Joseph F. Smith, October 24, 1901 – January 23, 1918; LDS Church Apostle, called by Joseph F. Smith, October 24, 1901 – January 23, 1918
Notes:	Brother of Joseph Fielding Smith, son of Joseph F. Smith, and grandson of Hyrum Smith.
Name:	George Albert Smith
Born:	April 4, 1870
Died:	April 4, 1951 (aged 81)
Positions:	8th President of the Church of Jesus Christ of Latter-day Saints, May 21, 1945 – April 4, 1951; President of the Quorum of the Twelve Apostles, June 21, 1943 – May 21, 1945; Quorum of the Twelve Apostles, called by Joseph F. Smith, October 8, 1903 – May 21, 1945; LDS Church Apostle, called by Joseph F. Smith, October 8, 1903 – April 4, 1951
Notes:	Son of John Henry Smith and grandson of George A. Smith.
Name:	Charles W. Penrose
Born:	4 February 1832
Died:	16 May 1925 (aged 93)
Positions:	First Counselor in the First Presidency, called by Heber J. Grant, 10 March 1921 – 16 May 1925; Second Counselor in the First Presidency, called by Heber J. Grant, 23 November 1918 – 10 March 1921; Second Counselor in the First Presidency, called by Joseph F. Smith, 7 December 1911 – 19 November 1918; Quorum of the Twelve Apostles, called by Joseph F. Smith, 7 July 1904 – 7 December 1911; LDS Church Apostle, called by Joseph F. Smith, 7 July 1904 – 16 May 1925
Notes:	Penrose was also a professor of theology at Brigham Young Academy from 1897 to 1899 and again in 1901 and 1902.
Name:	George F. Richards
Born:	February 23, 1861
Died:	August 8, 1950 (aged 89)
Positions:	President of the Quorum of the Twelve Apostles, May 21, 1945 – August 8, 1950; Acting Presiding Patriarch, called by Heber J. Grant, October 8, 1937 – October 3, 1942; Quorum of the Twelve Apostles, called by Joseph F. Smith, April 9, 1906 – August 8, 1950; LDS Church Apostle, called by Joseph F. Smith, April 9, 1906 – August 8, 1950
Notes:	Son of Franklin D. Richards
Name:	Orson F. Whitney
Born:	July 1, 1855
Died:	May 16, 1931 (aged 75)
Positions:	Quorum of the Twelve Apostles, called by Joseph F. Smith, April 9, 1906 – May 16, 1931; LDS Church Apostle, called by Joseph F. Smith, April 9, 1906 – May 16, 1931
Notes:	Grandson of both Newel K. Whitney and Heber C. Kimball.
Name:	David O. McKay
Born:	September 8, 1873
Died:	January 18, 1970 (aged 96)
Positions:	9th President of the Church of Jesus Christ of Latter-day Saints, April 9, 1951 – 18:00, January 18, 1970; President of the Quorum of the Twelve Apostles (with Joseph Fielding Smith as Acting President), August 8, 1950 – April 9, 1951; Second Counselor in the First Presidency, called by George Albert Smith, May 21, 1945 – April 4, 1951; Second Counselor in the First Presidency, called by Heber J. Grant, October 11, 1934 – May 14, 1945; Quorum of the Twelve Apostles, called by Joseph F. Smith, April 9, 1906 – October 11, 1934; LDS Church Apostle, called by Joseph F. Smith, April 9, 1906 – 18:00, January 18, 1970
Name:	Anthony W. Ivins
Born:	September 16, 1852
Died:	September 23, 1934 (aged 82)
Positions:	First Counselor in the First Presidency, called by Heber J. Grant, May 25, 1925 – September 23, 1934; Second Counselor in the First Presidency, called by Heber J. Grant, March 10, 1921 – May 25, 1925; Quorum of the Twelve Apostles, called by Joseph F. Smith, October 6, 1907 – March 10, 1921; LDS Church Apostle, called by Joseph F. Smith, October 6, 1907 – September 23, 1934
Name:	Joseph Fielding Smith
Born:	July 19, 1876
Died:	July 2, 1972 (aged 95)
Positions:	10th President of the Church of Jesus Christ of Latter-day Saints, January 23, 1970 – July 2, 1972; Counselor in the First Presidency, called by David O. McKay, October 29, 1965 – January 18, 1970; President of the Quorum of the Twelve Apostles, April 9, 1951 – January 23, 1970; Acting President of the Quorum of the Twelve Apostles, August 8, 1950 – April 4, 1951; Quorum of the Twelve Apostles, called by Joseph F. Smith, April 7, 1910 – January 23, 1970; LDS Church Apostle, called by Joseph F. Smith, April 7, 1910 – July 2, 1972
Notes:	Brother of Hyrum M. Smith, son of Joseph F. Smith, and grandson of Hyrum Smith. Remained a member of the quorum while a counselor to David O. McKay.
Name:	James E. Talmage
Born:	21 September 1862
Died:	27 July 1933 (aged 70)
Positions:	Quorum of the Twelve Apostles, called by Joseph F. Smith, 8 December 1911 – 27 July 1933; LDS Church Apostle, called by Joseph F. Smith, 8 December 1911 – 27 July 1933
Notes:	President of the University of Utah (1894–97).
Name:	Stephen L Richards
Born:	June 18, 1879
Died:	May 19, 1959 (aged 79)
Positions:	First Counselor in the First Presidency, called by David O. McKay, April 9, 1951 – May 19, 1959; Quorum of the Twelve Apostles, called by Joseph F. Smith, January 18, 1917 – April 9, 1951; LDS Church Apostle, called by Joseph F. Smith, January 18, 1917 – May 19, 1959
Notes:	Grandson of Willard Richards.
Name:	Richard R. Lyman
Born:	November 23, 1870
Died:	December 31, 1963 (aged 93)
Positions:	Quorum of the Twelve Apostles, called by Joseph F. Smith, April 7, 1918 – November 12, 1943; LDS Church Apostle, called by Joseph F. Smith, April 7, 1918 – November 12, 1943
Notes:	Son of Francis M. Lyman and grandson of Amasa Lyman. In 1925, Lyman had begun what he called a polygamous relationship after the practice of polygamy was banned in 1904. Lyman was excommunicated on November 12, 1943. The Quorum of the Twelve provided the newspapers with a one-sentence announcement, stating that the ground for excommunication was violation of the law of chastity.
Name:	Melvin J. Ballard
Born:	February 9, 1873
Died:	July 30, 1939 (aged 66)
Positions:	Quorum of the Twelve Apostles, called by Heber J. Grant, January 7, 1919 – July 30, 1939; LDS Church Apostle, called by Heber J. Grant, January 7, 1919 – July 30, 1939
Name:	John A. Widtsoe
Born:	31 January 1872
Died:	29 November 1952 (aged 80)
Positions:	Quorum of the Twelve Apostles, called by Heber J. Grant, 17 March 1921 – 29 November 1952; LDS Church Apostle, called by Heber J. Grant, 17 March 1921 – 29 November 1952
Notes:	President of Utah State University (1907–16) and president of the University of Utah (1916–21).
Name:	Joseph F. Merrill
Born:	August 24, 1868
Died:	February 3, 1952 (aged 83)
Positions:	Quorum of the Twelve Apostles, called by Heber J. Grant, October 8, 1931 – February 3, 1952; LDS Church Apostle, called by Heber J. Grant, October 8, 1931 – February 3, 1952
Notes:	Son of Marriner W. Merrill.
Name:	Charles A. Callis
Born:	May 4, 1865
Died:	January 21, 1947 (aged 81)
Positions:	Quorum of the Twelve Apostles, called by Heber J. Grant, October 12, 1933 – January 21, 1947; LDS Church Apostle, called by Heber J. Grant, October 12, 1933 – January 21, 1947
Notes:	Was also president of the Southern States Mission.
Name:	J. Reuben Clark
Born:	September 1, 1871
Died:	October 6, 1961 (aged 90)
Positions:	First Counselor in the First Presidency, called by David O. McKay, June 12, 1959 – October 6, 1961; Second Counselor in the First Presidency, called by David O. McKay, April 9, 1951 – June 12, 1959; First Counselor in the First Presidency, called by George Albert Smith, May 21, 1945 – April 4, 1951; First Counselor in the First Presidency, called by Heber J. Grant, October 6, 1934 – May 14, 1945; Quorum of the Twelve Apostles, October 11, 1934 – October 11, 1934; LDS Church Apostle, called by Heber J. Grant, October 11, 1934 – October 6, 1961; Second Counselor in the First Presidency, called by Heber J. Grant, April 6, 1933 – October 6, 1934
Notes:	United States Under Secretary of State (1928–29) and the U.S. Ambassador to Mexico (1930–33).
Name:	Alonzo A. Hinckley
Born:	April 23, 1870
Died:	December 22, 1936 (aged 66)
Positions:	Quorum of the Twelve Apostles, called by Heber J. Grant, October 11, 1934 – December 22, 1936; LDS Church Apostle, called by Heber J. Grant, October 11, 1934 – December 22, 1936
Notes:	Uncle of LDS Church President Gordon B. Hinckley.
Name:	Albert E. Bowen
Born:	October 31, 1875
Died:	July 15, 1953 (aged 77)
Positions:	Quorum of the Twelve Apostles, called by Heber J. Grant, April 8, 1937 – July 15, 1953; LDS Church Apostle, called by Heber J. Grant, April 8, 1937 – July 15, 1953
Name:	Sylvester Q. Cannon
Born:	June 10, 1877
Died:	May 29, 1943 (aged 65)
Positions:	Quorum of the Twelve Apostles, called by Heber J. Grant, October 6, 1939 – May 29, 1943; LDS Church Apostle, called by Heber J. Grant, April 6, 1938 – May 29, 1943; Associate to the Quorum of the Twelve Apostles, called by Heber J. Grant, April 14, 1938 – October 6, 1939; Presiding Bishop, called by Heber J. Grant, June 4, 1925 – April 6, 1938
Notes:	Son of George Q. Cannon. Was ordained apostle and Associate to the Quorum on April 14, 1938.
Name:	Harold B. Lee
Born:	March 28, 1899
Died:	December 26, 1973 (aged 74)
Positions:	11th President of the Church of Jesus Christ of Latter-day Saints, July 7, 1972 – December 26, 1973; President of the Quorum of the Twelve Apostles (with Spencer W. Kimball as Acting President), January 23, 1970 – July 7, 1972; First Counselor in the First Presidency, called by Joseph Fielding Smith, January 23, 1970 – July 2, 1972; Quorum of the Twelve Apostles, called by Heber J. Grant, April 10, 1941 – January 23, 1970; LDS Church Apostle, called by Heber J. Grant, April 10, 1941 – December 26, 1973
Name:	Spencer W. Kimball
Born:	March 28, 1895
Died:	November 5, 1985 (aged 90)
Positions:	12th President of the Church of Jesus Christ of Latter-day Saints, December 30, 1973 – November 5, 1985; President of the Quorum of the Twelve Apostles, July 7, 1972 – December 30, 1973; Acting President of the Quorum of the Twelve Apostles, January 23, 1970 – July 2, 1972; Quorum of the Twelve Apostles, called by Heber J. Grant, October 7, 1943 – December 30, 1973; LDS Church Apostle, called by Heber J. Grant, October 7, 1943 – November 5, 1985
Notes:	Grandson of Heber C. Kimball. Cousin of both Orson F. Whitney and J. Reuben Clark.
Name:	Ezra Taft Benson
Born:	August 4, 1899
Died:	May 30, 1994 (aged 94)
Positions:	13th President of the Church of Jesus Christ of Latter-day Saints, November 10, 1985 – May 30, 1994; President of the Quorum of the Twelve Apostles, December 30, 1973 – November 10, 1985; Quorum of the Twelve Apostles, called by Heber J. Grant, October 7, 1943 – November 10, 1985; LDS Church Apostle, called by Heber J. Grant, October 7, 1943 – May 30, 1994
Notes:	Great-grandson of Ezra T. Benson. U.S. Secretary of Agriculture, 1953–61.
Name:	Mark E. Petersen
Born:	November 7, 1900
Died:	January 11, 1984 (aged 83)
Positions:	Quorum of the Twelve Apostles, called by Heber J. Grant, April 20, 1944 – January 11, 1984; LDS Church Apostle, called by Heber J. Grant, April 20, 1944 – January 11, 1984
Name:	Matthew Cowley
Born:	August 2, 1897
Died:	December 13, 1953 (aged 56)
Positions:	Quorum of the Twelve Apostles, called by George Albert Smith, October 11, 1945 – December 13, 1953; LDS Church Apostle, called by George Albert Smith, October 11, 1945 – December 13, 1953
Notes:	Son of apostle Matthias F. Cowley.
Name:	Henry D. Moyle
Born:	April 22, 1889
Died:	September 18, 1963 (aged 74)
Positions:	First Counselor in the First Presidency, called by David O. McKay, October 12, 1961 – September 18, 1963; Second Counselor in the First Presidency, called by David O. McKay, June 12, 1959 – October 12, 1961; Quorum of the Twelve Apostles, called by George Albert Smith, April 10, 1947 – June 12, 1959; LDS Church Apostle, April 10, 1947 – September 18, 1963
Name:	Delbert L. Stapley
Born:	December 11, 1896
Died:	August 19, 1978 (aged 81)
Positions:	Quorum of the Twelve Apostles, called by George Albert Smith, October 5, 1950 – August 19, 1978; LDS Church Apostle, called by George Albert Smith, October 5, 1950 – August 19, 1978
Notes:	As a youth, he rejected a chance at playing Major League Baseball so he could serve a mission in the southern United States.
Name:	Marion G. Romney
Born:	September 19, 1897
Died:	May 20, 1988 (aged 90)
Positions:	President of the Quorum of the Twelve Apostles (with Howard W. Hunter as Acting President), November 10, 1985 – May 20, 1988; Quorum of the Twelve Apostles, November 5, 1985 – May 20, 1988; First Counselor in the First Presidency, called by Spencer W. Kimball, December 2, 1982 – November 5, 1985; Second Counselor in the First Presidency, called by Harold B. Lee, July 7, 1972 – December 2, 1982; Quorum of the Twelve Apostles, called by David O. McKay, October 4, 1951 – July 7, 1972; LDS Church Apostle, called by David O. McKay, October 11, 1951 – May 20, 1988; Assistant to the Quorum of the Twelve Apostles, called by Heber J. Grant, April 6, 1941 – October 4, 1951
Notes:	Parents were American. One of the first five individuals selected as Assistants to the Quorum of the Twelve Apostles in 1941.
Name:	LeGrand Richards
Born:	February 6, 1886
Died:	January 11, 1983 (aged 96)
Positions:	Quorum of the Twelve Apostles, called by David O. McKay, April 6, 1952 – January 11, 1983; LDS Church Apostle, called by David O. McKay, April 10, 1952 – January 11, 1983; Presiding Bishop, called by Heber J. Grant, April 6, 1938 – April 6, 1952
Notes:	Son of George F. Richards, grandson of Franklin D. Richards, and nephew of Willard Richards.
Name:	Adam S. Bennion
Born:	December 2, 1886
Died:	February 11, 1958 (aged 71)
Positions:	Quorum of the Twelve Apostles, called by David O. McKay, April 9, 1953 – February 11, 1958; LDS Church Apostle, called by David O. McKay, April 9, 1953 – February 11, 1958
Name:	Richard L. Evans
Born:	March 23, 1906
Died:	November 1, 1971 (aged 65)
Positions:	Quorum of the Twelve Apostles, called by David O. McKay, October 8, 1953 – November 1, 1971; LDS Church Apostle, called by David O. McKay, October 8, 1953 – November 1, 1971; First Council of the Seventy, called by Heber J. Grant, October 7, 1938 – October 8, 1953
Notes:	Was the Announcer for Music and the Spoken Word from June 1930 to October 1971.
Name:	George Q. Morris
Born:	February 20, 1874
Died:	April 23, 1962 (aged 88)
Positions:	Quorum of the Twelve Apostles, called by David O. McKay, April 8, 1954 – April 23, 1962; LDS Church Apostle, called by David O. McKay, April 8, 1954 – April 23, 1962; Assistant to the Quorum of the Twelve Apostles, called by David O. McKay, October 6, 1951 – April 8, 1954
Name:	Hugh B. Brown
Born:	October 24, 1883
Died:	December 2, 1975 (aged 92)
Positions:	Quorum of the Twelve Apostles, January 18, 1970 – December 2, 1975; First Counselor in the First Presidency, called by David O. McKay, October 4, 1963 – January 18, 1970; Second Counselor in the First Presidency, called by David O. McKay, October 12, 1961 – October 4, 1963; Third Counselor in the First Presidency, called by David O. McKay, June 22, 1961 – October 12, 1961; Quorum of the Twelve Apostles, called by David O. McKay, April 10, 1958 – June 22, 1961; LDS Church Apostle, called by David O. McKay, April 10, 1958 – December 2, 1975; Assistant to the Quorum of the Twelve Apostles, called by David O. McKay, October 4, 1953 – April 10, 1958
Notes:	Also worked as a professor of religion at Brigham Young University from 1946 to 1949. Uncle of N. Eldon Tanner
Name:	Howard W. Hunter
Born:	November 14, 1907
Died:	March 3, 1995 (aged 87)
Positions:	14th President of the Church of Jesus Christ of Latter-day Saints, June 5, 1994 – March 3, 1995; President of the Quorum of the Twelve Apostles, May 20, 1988 – June 5, 1994; Acting President of the Quorum of the Twelve Apostles, November 10, 1985 – May 20, 1988; Quorum of the Twelve Apostles, called by David O. McKay, October 10, 1959 – June 5, 1994; LDS Church Apostle, called by David O. McKay, October 15, 1959 – March 3, 1995
Name:	Gordon B. Hinckley
Born:	June 23, 1910
Died:	January 27, 2008 (aged 97)
Positions:	15th President of the Church of Jesus Christ of Latter-day Saints, March 12, 1995 – January 27, 2008; President of the Quorum of the Twelve Apostles (with Boyd K. Packer as Acting President), June 5, 1994 – March 12, 1995; First Counselor in the First Presidency, called by Howard W. Hunter, June 5, 1994 – March 3, 1995; First Counselor in the First Presidency, called by Ezra Taft Benson, November 10, 1985 – June 5, 1994; Second Counselor in the First Presidency, called by Spencer W. Kimball, December 2, 1982 – November 5, 1985; Counselor in the First Presidency, called by Spencer W. Kimball, July 23, 1981 – December 2, 1982; Quorum of the Twelve Apostles, called by David O. McKay, October 5, 1961 – July 23, 1981; LDS Church Apostle, called by David O. McKay, October 5, 1961 – January 27, 2008; Assistant to the Quorum of the Twelve Apostles, called by David O. McKay, April 6, 1958 – October 5, 1961
Notes:	Nephew of Alonzo A. Hinckley.
Name:	N. Eldon Tanner
Born:	May 9, 1898
Died:	November 27, 1982 (aged 84)
Positions:	First Counselor in the First Presidency, called by Spencer W. Kimball, December 30, 1973 – November 27, 1982; First Counselor in the First Presidency, called by Harold B. Lee, July 7, 1972 – December 26, 1973; Second Counselor in the First Presidency, called by Joseph Fielding Smith, January 23, 1970 – July 2, 1972; Second Counselor in the First Presidency, called by David O. McKay, October 4, 1963 – January 18, 1970; Quorum of the Twelve Apostles, called by David O. McKay, October 11, 1962 – October 4, 1963; LDS Church Apostle, called by David O. McKay, October 11, 1962 – November 27, 1982; Assistant to the Quorum of the Twelve Apostles, called by David O. McKay, October 8, 1960 – October 11, 1962
Notes:	Member (1935–52) of and Speaker (1936–37) of the Legislative Assembly of Alberta. Nephew of Hugh B. Brown
Name:	Thomas S. Monson
Born:	August 21, 1927
Died:	January 2, 2018 (aged 90)
Positions:	16th President of the Church of Jesus Christ of Latter-day Saints, February 3, 2008 – January 2, 2018; President of the Quorum of the Twelve Apostles (with Boyd K. Packer as Acting President), March 12, 1995 – February 3, 2008; First Counselor in the First Presidency, called by Gordon B. Hinckley, March 12, 1995 – January 27, 2008; Second Counselor in the First Presidency, called by Ezra Taft Benson, November 10, 1985 – March 3, 1995; Quorum of the Twelve Apostles, called by David O. McKay, October 4, 1963 – November 10, 1985; LDS Church Apostle, called by David O. McKay, October 10, 1963 – January 2, 2018
Name:	Boyd K. Packer
Born:	September 10, 1924
Died:	July 3, 2015 (aged 90)
Positions:	President of the Quorum of the Twelve Apostles, February 3, 2008 – July 3, 2015; Acting President of the Quorum of the Twelve Apostles, June 5, 1994 – January 27, 2008; Quorum of the Twelve Apostles, called by Joseph Fielding Smith, April 6, 1970 – July 3, 2015; LDS Church Apostle, called by Joseph Fielding Smith, April 9, 1970 – July 3, 2015; Assistant to the Quorum of the Twelve Apostles, called by David O. McKay, September 30, 1961 – April 6, 1970
Name:	Marvin J. Ashton
Born:	May 6, 1915
Died:	February 25, 1994 (aged 78)
Positions:	Quorum of the Twelve Apostles, called by Joseph Fielding Smith, December 2, 1971 – February 25, 1994; LDS Church Apostle, called by Joseph Fielding Smith, December 2, 1971 – February 25, 1994; Assistant to the Quorum of the Twelve Apostles, called by David O. McKay, October 3, 1969 – December 2, 1971
Name:	Bruce R. McConkie
Born:	July 29, 1915
Died:	April 19, 1985 (aged 69)
Positions:	Quorum of the Twelve Apostles, called by Harold B. Lee, October 12, 1972 – April 19, 1985; LDS Church Apostle, called by Harold B. Lee, October 12, 1972 – April 19, 1985; First Council of the Seventy, called by George Albert Smith, October 6, 1946 – October 12, 1972
Notes:	Son-in-law of Joseph Fielding Smith.
Name:	L. Tom Perry
Born:	August 5, 1922
Died:	May 30, 2015 (aged 92)
Positions:	Quorum of the Twelve Apostles, called by Spencer W. Kimball, April 6, 1974 – May 30, 2015; Apostle, called by Spencer W. Kimball, April 11, 1974 – May 30, 2015; Assistant to the Quorum of the Twelve Apostles, called by Harold B. Lee, October 6, 1972 – April 6, 1974
Name:	David B. Haight
Born:	September 2, 1906
Died:	July 31, 2004 (aged 97)
Positions:	Quorum of the Twelve Apostles, called by Spencer W. Kimball, January 8, 1976 – July 31, 2004; LDS Church Apostle, called by Spencer W. Kimball, January 8, 1976 – July 31, 2004; Assistant to the Quorum of the Twelve Apostles, called by Joseph Fielding Smith, April 6, 1970 – January 8, 1976
Name:	James E. Faust
Born:	July 31, 1920
Died:	August 10, 2007 (aged 87)
Positions:	Second Counselor in the First Presidency, called by Gordon B. Hinckley, March 12, 1995 – August 10, 2007; Quorum of the Twelve Apostles, called by Spencer W. Kimball, September 30, 1978 – March 12, 1995; LDS Church Apostle, called by Spencer W. Kimball, October 1, 1978 – August 10, 2007; Presidency of the First Quorum of the Seventy, called by Spencer W. Kimball, October 1, 1976 – September 30, 1978; First Quorum of the Seventy, called by Spencer W. Kimball, October 1, 1976 – September 30, 1978; Assistant to the Quorum of the Twelve Apostles, called by Harold B. Lee, October 6, 1972 – October 1, 1976
Name:	Neal A. Maxwell
Born:	July 6, 1926
Died:	July 21, 2004 (aged 78)
Positions:	Quorum of the Twelve Apostles, called by Spencer W. Kimball, July 23, 1981 – July 21, 2004; LDS Church Apostle, called by Spencer W. Kimball, July 23, 1981 – July 21, 2004; Presidency of the First Quorum of the Seventy, called by Spencer W. Kimball, October 1, 1976 – July 23, 1981; First Quorum of the Seventy, called by Spencer W. Kimball, October 1, 1976 – July 23, 1981; Assistant to the Quorum of the Twelve Apostles, called by Spencer W. Kimball, April 6, 1974 – October 1, 1976
Name:	Russell M. Nelson
Born:	September 9, 1924
Died:	September 27, 2025 (aged 101)
Positions:	17th President of the Church of Jesus Christ of Latter-day Saints, January 14, 2018 – September 27, 2025; President of the Quorum of the Twelve Apostles, July 3, 2015 – January 14, 2018; Quorum of the Twelve Apostles, called by Spencer W. Kimball, April 7, 1984 – January 14, 2018; LDS Church Apostle, called by Spencer W. Kimball, April 12, 1984 – September 27, 2025
Name:	Dallin H. Oaks
Born:	August 12, 1932 (age 93)
Positions:	18th President of the Church of Jesus Christ of Latter-day Saints, October 14, 2025 – present President of the Quorum of the Twelve Apostles (with M. Russell Ballard, then Jeffrey R. Holland, as Acting President), January 14, 2018 – October 14, 2025; First Counselor in the First Presidency, called by Russell M. Nelson, January 14, 2018 – September 27, 2025; Quorum of the Twelve Apostles, called by Spencer W. Kimball, May 3, 1984 – January 14, 2018; LDS Church Apostle, called by Spencer W. Kimball, May 3, 1984
Notes:	A former professor of law at the University of Chicago Law School, a former president of Brigham Young University, and a former justice of the Utah Supreme Court.
Name:	M. Russell Ballard
Born:	October 8, 1928
Died:	November 12, 2023 (aged 95)
Positions:	Acting President of the Quorum of the Twelve Apostles, called by Russell M. Nelson, January 14, 2018 – November 12, 2023; Quorum of the Twelve Apostles, called by Spencer W. Kimball, October 6, 1985 – November 12, 2023; LDS Church Apostle, called by Spencer W. Kimball, October 10, 1985 – November 12, 2023; Presidency of the First Quorum of the Seventy, called by Spencer W. Kimball, February 21, 1980 – October 6, 1985; First Quorum of the Seventy, called by Spencer W. Kimball, April 3, 1976 – October 6, 1985
Notes:	Grandson of both Hyrum Mack Smith and Melvin J. Ballard; direct descendant of Joseph F. Smith and Hyrum Smith.
Name:	Joseph B. Wirthlin
Born:	June 11, 1917
Died:	December 1, 2008 (aged 91)
Positions:	Quorum of the Twelve Apostles, called by Ezra Taft Benson, October 4, 1986 – December 1, 2008; LDS Church Apostle, called by Ezra Taft Benson, October 9, 1986 – December 1, 2008; Presidency of the First Quorum of the Seventy, called by Ezra Taft Benson, August 28, 1986 – October 4, 1986; First Quorum of the Seventy, called by Spencer W. Kimball, October 1, 1976 – October 4, 1986; Assistant to the Quorum of the Twelve Apostles, called by Spencer W. Kimball, April 4, 1975 – October 1, 1976
Name:	Richard G. Scott
Born:	November 7, 1928
Died:	September 22, 2015 (aged 86)
Positions:	Quorum of the Twelve Apostles, called by Ezra Taft Benson, October 1, 1988 – September 22, 2015; LDS Church Apostle, called by Ezra Taft Benson, October 6, 1988 – September 22, 2015; Presidency of the First Quorum of the Seventy, called by Spencer W. Kimball, October 1, 1983 – October 1, 1988; First Quorum of the Seventy, called by Spencer W. Kimball, April 2, 1977 – October 1, 1988
Name:	Robert D. Hales
Born:	August 24, 1932
Died:	October 1, 2017 (aged 85)
Positions:	Quorum of the Twelve Apostles, called by Ezra Taft Benson, April 2, 1994 – October 1, 2017; LDS Church Apostle, called by Ezra Taft Benson, April 7, 1994 – October 1, 2017; Presiding Bishop, called by Spencer W. Kimball, April 6, 1985 – April 2, 1994; First Quorum of the Seventy, called by Spencer W. Kimball, October 1, 1976 – April 6, 1985; Assistant to the Quorum of the Twelve Apostles, called by Spencer W. Kimball, April 4, 1975 – October 1, 1976
Name:	Jeffrey R. Holland
Born:	December 3, 1940
Died:	December 27, 2025 (aged 85)
Positions:	President of the Quorum of the Twelve Apostles, October 14, 2025 – December 27, 2025; Acting President of the Quorum of the Twelve Apostles, called by Russell M. Nelson, November 15, 2023 – September 27, 2025; Quorum of the Twelve Apostles, called by Howard W. Hunter, June 23, 1994 – December 27, 2025; LDS Church Apostle, called by Howard W. Hunter, June 23, 1994 – December 27, 2025; First Quorum of the Seventy, called by Ezra Taft Benson, April 1, 1989 – June 23, 1994
Notes:	A former president of Brigham Young University.
Name:	Henry B. Eyring
Born:	May 31, 1933 (age 92)
Positions:	President of the Quorum of the Twelve Apostles (with Dieter F. Uchtdorf as Acting President), December 27, 2025 – present First Counselor in the First Presidency, called by Dallin H. Oaks, October 14, 2025 – present Second Counselor in the First Presidency, called by Russell M. Nelson, January 14, 2018 – September 27, 2025; First Counselor in the First Presidency, called by Thomas S. Monson, February 3, 2008 – January 2, 2018; Second Counselor in the First Presidency, called by Gordon B. Hinckley, October 6, 2007 – January 27, 2008; Quorum of the Twelve Apostles, called by Gordon B. Hinckley, April 1, 1995 – October 6, 2007; LDS Church Apostle, called by Gordon B. Hinckley, April 6, 1995; First Quorum of the Seventy, called by Ezra Taft Benson, October 3, 1992 – April 1, 1995; First Counselor in the Presiding Bishopric, called by Robert D. Hales, April 1, 1985 – October 3, 1992
Notes:	A former president of Ricks College.

== 21st century ==
Name:	Dieter F. Uchtdorf
Born:	November 6, 1940 (age 85)
Positions:	Acting President of the Quorum of the Twelve Apostles, called by Dallin H. Oaks, January 8, 2026 – present Quorum of the Twelve Apostles, January 2, 2018 – present Second Counselor in the First Presidency, called by Thomas S. Monson, February 3, 2008 – January 2, 2018; Quorum of the Twelve Apostles, called by Gordon B. Hinckley, October 2, 2004 – February 3, 2008; LDS Church Apostle, called by Gordon B. Hinckley, October 7, 2004; Presidency of the Seventy, called by Gordon B. Hinckley, August 15, 2002 – October 2, 2004; First Quorum of the Seventy, called by Gordon B. Hinckley, April 7, 1996 – October 2, 2004; Second Quorum of the Seventy, called by Ezra Taft Benson, April 2, 1994 – April 7, 1996
Notes:	The eleventh apostle born outside the United States.
Name:	David A. Bednar
Born:	June 15, 1952 (age 73)
Positions:	Quorum of the Twelve Apostles, called by Gordon B. Hinckley, October 2, 2004; LDS Church Apostle, called by Gordon B. Hinckley, October 7, 2004
Notes:	Final president of Ricks College and first president of Brigham Young University–Idaho.
Name:	Quentin L. Cook
Born:	September 8, 1940 (age 85)
Positions:	Quorum of the Twelve Apostles, called by Gordon B. Hinckley, October 6, 2007; LDS Church Apostle, called by Gordon B. Hinckley, October 11, 2007; Presidency of the Seventy, called by Gordon B. Hinckley, August 1, 2007 – October 6, 2007; First Quorum of the Seventy, called by Gordon B. Hinckley, April 5, 1998 – October 6, 2007; Second Quorum of the Seventy, called by Gordon B. Hinckley, April 6, 1996 – April 5, 1998
Name:	D. Todd Christofferson
Born:	January 24, 1945 (age 81)
Positions:	Second Counselor in the First Presidency, called by Dallin H. Oaks, October 14, 2025 – present Quorum of the Twelve Apostles, called by Thomas S. Monson, April 5, 2008 – October 14, 2025; LDS Church Apostle, called by Thomas S. Monson, April 10, 2008; Presidency of the Seventy, called by Gordon B. Hinckley, August 15, 1998 – April 5, 2008; First Quorum of the Seventy, called by Ezra Taft Benson, April 3, 1993 – April 5, 2008
Name:	Neil L. Andersen
Born:	August 9, 1951 (age 74)
Positions:	Quorum of the Twelve Apostles, called by Thomas S. Monson, April 4, 2009; LDS Church Apostle, called by Thomas S. Monson, April 9, 2009; Presidency of the Seventy, called by Gordon B. Hinckley, August 15, 2005 – April 4, 2009; First Quorum of the Seventy, called by Ezra Taft Benson, April 3, 1993 – April 4, 2009
Name:	Ronald A. Rasband
Born:	February 6, 1951 (age 75)
Positions:	Quorum of the Twelve Apostles, called by Thomas S. Monson, October 3, 2015; LDS Church Apostle, called by Thomas S. Monson, October 8, 2015; Presidency of the Seventy, called by Gordon B. Hinckley, August 15, 2005 – October 3, 2015; First Quorum of the Seventy, called by Gordon B. Hinckley, April 1, 2000 – October 3, 2015
Name:	Gary E. Stevenson
Born:	August 6, 1955 (age 70)
Positions:	Quorum of the Twelve Apostles, called by Thomas S. Monson, October 3, 2015; LDS Church Apostle, called by Thomas S. Monson, October 8, 2015; Presiding Bishop, called by Thomas S. Monson, March 31, 2012 – October 9, 2015; First Quorum of the Seventy, called by Thomas S. Monson, April 5, 2008 – March 31, 2012
Name:	Dale G. Renlund
Born:	November 13, 1952 (age 73)
Positions:	Quorum of the Twelve Apostles, called by Thomas S. Monson, October 3, 2015; LDS Church Apostle, called by Thomas S. Monson, October 8, 2015; First Quorum of the Seventy, called by Thomas S. Monson, April 4, 2009 – October 3, 2015
Name:	Gerrit W. Gong
Born:	December 23, 1953 (age 72)
Positions:	Quorum of the Twelve Apostles, called by Russell M. Nelson, March 31, 2018; LDS Church Apostle, called by Russell M. Nelson, April 5, 2018; Presidency of the Seventy, called by Thomas S. Monson, October 6, 2015 – March 31, 2018; First Quorum of the Seventy, called by Thomas S. Monson, April 3, 2010 – March 31, 2018
Notes:	First apostle of Asian descent
Name:	Ulisses Soares
Born:	October 2, 1958 (age 67)
Positions:	Quorum of the Twelve Apostles, called by Russell M. Nelson, March 31, 2018; LDS Church Apostle, called by Russell M. Nelson, April 5, 2018; Presidency of the Seventy, called by Thomas S. Monson, January 6, 2013 – March 31, 2018; First Quorum of the Seventy, called by Gordon B. Hinckley, April 2, 2005 – March 31, 2018
Notes:	The twelfth apostle born outside the United States and the first born in South America (Brazil).
Name:	Patrick Kearon
Born:	July 18, 1961 (age 64)
Positions:	Quorum of the Twelve Apostles, called by Russell M. Nelson, December 7, 2023; LDS Church Apostle, called by Russell M. Nelson, December 7, 2023; Presidency of the Seventy, called by Thomas S. Monson, August 2017 – December 7, 2023; First Quorum of the Seventy, called by Thomas S. Monson, April 3, 2010 – December 7, 2023
Notes:	The thirteenth apostle born outside the United States (U.K.).
Name:	Gérald Caussé
Born:	May 20, 1963 (age 62)
Positions:	Quorum of the Twelve Apostles, called by Dallin H. Oaks, November 6, 2025; LDS Church Apostle, called by Dallin H. Oaks, November 6, 2025; Presiding Bishop, called by Thomas S. Monson, October 9, 2015; First Counselor in the Presiding Bishopric, called by Gary E. Stevenson, March 31, 2012 – October 9, 2015; First Quorum of the Seventy, called by Thomas S. Monson, April 5, 2008 – March 31, 2012
Notes:	The fourteenth apostle born outside the United States and the first born in France.
Name:	Clark G. Gilbert
Born:	June 18, 1970 (age 55)
Positions:	Quorum of the Twelve Apostles, called by Dallin H. Oaks, February 12, 2026; LDS Church Apostle, called by Dallin H. Oaks, February 12, 2026; General Authority Seventy, called by Russell M. Nelson, April 3, 2021 – February 12, 2026

== Apostles who were never members of the Quorum of the Twelve ==
The following men were ordained to the priesthood office of apostle but were never members of the Quorum of the Twelve Apostles. Some, but not all, served in the First Presidency of the LDS Church.

Name:	Joseph Smith
Born:	December 23, 1805
Died:	June 27, 1844 (aged 38)
Positions:	1st President of the Church of Christ (later the Church of Jesus Christ of Latter Day Saints), April 6, 1830 – June 27, 1844
Notes:	Founder of the Latter Day Saint movement. Also Mayor of Nauvoo, Illinois (1842–1844).
Name:	Oliver Cowdery
Born:	October 3, 1806
Died:	March 3, 1850 (aged 43)
Positions:	Assistant Counselor in the First Presidency, called by Joseph Smith, September 3, 1837 – April 11, 1838; Assistant President of the Church, called by Joseph Smith, December 5, 1834 – April 11, 1838; Second Elder of the Church, called by Joseph Smith, April 6, 1830 – December 5, 1834; Latter Day Saint Apostle, called by Joseph Smith, 1829 (aged 22) – April 12, 1838
Name:	David Whitmer
Born:	January 7, 1805
Died:	January 25, 1888 (aged 83)
Positions:	President of the Church (Church of Christ—Whitmerites), January 28, 1876 – January 25, 1888; President of the Church (Church of Christ—Whitmerites), September 7, 1847 – ca. 1848; President High Council, July 3, 1834 – January, 1838; President of Zion, July 7, 1834 – February 5, 1838; Latter Day Saint Apostle, called by Joseph Smith, June 1829 – June, 1838
Name:	Martin Harris
Born:	May 18, 1783
Died:	July 10, 1875 (aged 92)
Positions:	Latter Day Saint Apostle, called by Joseph Smith, date unknown – ca. 1837
Name:	Hyrum Smith
Born:	February 9, 1800
Died:	June 27, 1844 (aged 44)
Positions:	Assistant President of the Church, called by Joseph Smith, January 24, 1841 – June 27, 1844; Latter Day Saint Apostle, called by Joseph Smith, January 24, 1841 – June 27, 1844; 2nd Presiding Patriarch, called by Joseph Smith, September 14, 1840 – June 27, 1844; Second Counselor in the First Presidency, called by Joseph Smith, November 7, 1837 – January 24, 1841; Assistant Counselor in the First Presidency, called by Joseph Smith, September 3, 1837 – November 7, 1837
Notes:	Brother of Joseph Smith
Name:	Jedediah M. Grant
Born:	February 21, 1816
Died:	December 1, 1856 (aged 40)
Positions:	Second Counselor in the First Presidency, called by Brigham Young, April 7, 1854 – December 1, 1856; LDS Church Apostle, called by Brigham Young, April 7, 1854 – December 1, 1856; First Seven Presidents of the Seventy, called by Brigham Young, December 2, 1845 – April 7, 1854
Notes:	He was known for his fiery speeches during the Reformation of 1856, earning the nickname, "Brigham's Sledgehammer". He was a member of the Council of Fifty and Mayor of Salt Lake City (1851–56). He is the father of Heber J. Grant, who later served as President of the Church.
Name:	Daniel H. Wells
Born:	October 27, 1814
Died:	March 24, 1891 (aged 76)
Positions:	Counselor to the Quorum of the Twelve Apostles, called by John Taylor, October 6, 1877 – March 24, 1891; Second Counselor in First Presidency, called by Brigham Young, January 4, 1857 – August 29, 1877; LDS Church Apostle, called by Brigham Young, January 4, 1857 – March 24, 1891
Notes:	Wells was a member of the Council of Fifty, Mayor of Salt Lake City (1866–76), president of the Manti Utah Temple (1888–91), and presided over the continuing construction of the Salt Lake Temple as the superintendent of public works for the LDS Church (1848–63). On April 6, 1877, Wells dedicated the St. George Utah Temple.
Name:	John Willard Young
Born:	October 1, 1844
Died:	February 12, 1924 (aged 79)
Positions:	Counselor to the Quorum of the Twelve Apostles, called by John Taylor, October 6, 1877 – October 3, 1891; First Counselor in the First Presidency, called by Brigham Young, October 8, 1876 – August 29, 1877; Assistant Counselor in the First Presidency, called by Brigham Young, May 9, 1874 – October 8, 1876; Counselor in the First Presidency, called by Brigham Young, June 8, 1873 – May 9, 1874; LDS Church Apostle, called by Brigham Young, November 22, 1855 – February 12, 1924
Notes:	Served as member of the Council of Fifty. In 1888, Joseph F. Smith accused Young of unethically using church funds to maintain a lavish lifestyle. By April 1889, the First Presidency and Quorum of the Twelve Apostles were discussing Young's release. In response, Young resigned from his position on October 3, 1891. For another 33 years, Young remained a church apostle, but never again served as a general authority.
Name:	Joseph Angell Young
Born:	October 14, 1834
Died:	August 5, 1875 (aged 40)
Positions:	LDS Church Apostle, called by Brigham Young, February 4, 1864 – August 5, 1875
Name:	Alvin R. Dyer
Born:	January 1, 1903
Died:	March 6, 1977 (aged 74)
Positions:	First Quorum of the Seventy, called by Spencer W. Kimball, October 1, 1976 – March 6, 1977; Assistant to the Quorum of the Twelve Apostles, called by Joseph Fielding Smith, January 18, 1970 – October 1, 1976; Counselor in the First Presidency, called by David O. McKay, April 6, 1968 – January 18, 1970; LDS Church Apostle, called by David O. McKay, October 5, 1967 – March 6, 1977; Assistant to the Quorum of the Twelve Apostles, called by David O. McKay, October 11, 1958 – October 5, 1967

=== J. Reuben Clark ===
In addition, J. Reuben Clark was only a member of the Quorum of the Twelve for one week in 1945 and six days in 1951, which were periods of time when the First Presidency was dissolved due to the death of the President of the Church.

Name:	J. Reuben Clark
Born:	September 1, 1871
Died:	October 6, 1961 (aged 90)
Positions:	First Counselor in the First Presidency, called by David O. McKay, June 12, 1959 – October 6, 1961; Second Counselor in the First Presidency, called by David O. McKay, April 9, 1951 – June 12, 1959; First Counselor in the First Presidency, called by George Albert Smith, May 21, 1945 – April 4, 1951; First Counselor in the First Presidency, called by Heber J. Grant, October 6, 1934 – May 14, 1945; Quorum of the Twelve Apostles, October 11, 1934 – October 11, 1934; LDS Church Apostle, called by Heber J. Grant, October 11, 1934 – October 6, 1961; Second Counselor in the First Presidency, called by Heber J. Grant, April 6, 1933 – October 6, 1934
Notes:	United States Under Secretary of State (1928–29) and the U.S. Ambassador to Mexico (1930–33).

== See also ==
- Chronology of the First Presidency (LDS Church)
- Chronology of the Quorum of the Twelve Apostles (LDS Church)
- List of presidents of the Church of Jesus Christ of Latter-day Saints
- Succession in the Presidency (LDS Church)
