= M. Russell Ballard =

American businessman and religious leader (1928–2023)

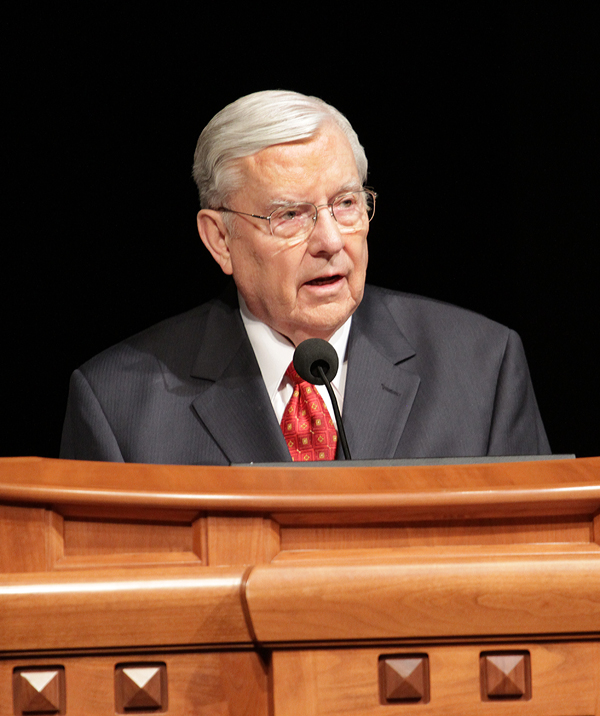
- Ballard speaking at the BYU Church History Symposium in 2012

Acting President of the Quorum of the Twelve Apostles
- January 14, 2018 – November 12, 2023
- Called by: Russell M. Nelson
- Successor: Jeffrey R. Holland

Quorum of the Twelve Apostles
- October 6, 1985 – November 12, 2023
- Called by: Spencer W. Kimball

LDS Church Apostle
- October 10, 1985 – November 12, 2023
- Called by: Spencer W. Kimball
- Reason: Death of Bruce R. McConkie
- Reorganization at end of term: Patrick Kearon ordained

Presidency of the First Quorum of the Seventy
- February 22, 1980 – October 6, 1985
- Called by: Spencer W. Kimball
- End reason: Called to the Quorum of the Twelve Apostles

First Quorum of the Seventy
- April 3, 1976 – October 6, 1985
- Called by: Spencer W. Kimball
- End reason: Called to the Quorum of the Twelve Apostles

Military career
- Service/branch: United States Army Reserve
- Rank: First lieutenant

Personal details
- Born: Melvin Russell Ballard Jr. October 8, 1928; Salt Lake City, Utah, U.S.
- Died: November 12, 2023 (aged 95); Salt Lake City, Utah, U.S.
- Alma mater: University of Utah
- Occupation: Businessman
- Spouse(s): Barbara Bowen (m. 1951; died 2018)
- Children: 7
- Signature
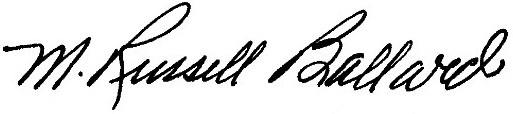

Melvin Russell Ballard Jr. (October 8, 1928 – November 12, 2023) was an American businessman and religious leader who served as the Acting President of the Quorum of the Twelve Apostles of the Church of Jesus Christ of Latter-day Saints (LDS Church) from 2018 until his death in 2023. He had been a member of the church's Quorum of the Twelve Apostles since 1985. As a member of the Quorum of the Twelve, Ballard was accepted by church members as a prophet, seer, and revelator. At the time of his death, he was the third most senior apostle in the church.

== Biography ==
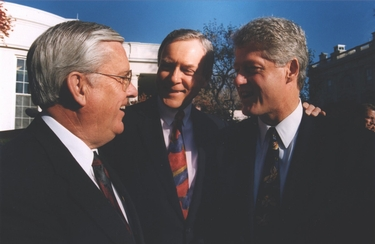
Ballard with President Bill Clinton and United States Senator Orrin Hatch in 1993

Ballard was born in Salt Lake City, Utah to Melvin Russell Ballard and his wife, Geraldine Smith. As a young man, Ballard served as a missionary in England from 1948 to 1950, during which he was a counselor in the mission presidency. He met his wife while they were studying at the University of Utah. Over the following years, Ballard served in multiple positions in the LDS Church, including twice as a bishop. In 1974, Ballard was called as president of the church's Canada Toronto Mission. While serving as a mission president in 1976, he was called to the First Quorum of the Seventy; he completed his three-year term as mission president as a member of the seventy. Among other assignments as a seventy, he was the editor of the church's magazines from the start of 1980 until the end of 1984. He was a member of the Presidency of the Seventy from 1980 until 1985. As a general authority, Ballard was also president of the church's International Mission and the executive director of the church's missionary department.

Following the death of apostle Bruce R. McConkie, Ballard was sustained to the Quorum of the Twelve Apostles on October 6, 1985 and ordained an apostle on October 10, 1985.

Ballard was the grandson of apostles Melvin J. Ballard and Hyrum M. Smith. Through Hyrum M. Smith, Ballard was a descendant of Hyrum Smith, brother of church founder Joseph Smith. Among other assignments as an apostle, Ballard oversaw the church's celebration of the Pioneer Sesquicentennial in 1997.

Following the January 2018 death of church president Thomas S. Monson, the church's First Presidency was reorganized with Russell M. Nelson as president. Nelson selected Dallin H. Oaks, the next senior apostle and new quorum president, as First Counselor in the First Presidency. As the next senior apostle not in the First Presidency, Ballard became the quorum's acting president.

=== Death ===
In late October 2023, Ballard was briefly hospitalized for respiratory problems. He died less than a month later at his home in Salt Lake City on November 12, 2023, at age 95.

== Business activities ==
Professionally, Ballard was involved in several enterprises, including automotive, real estate, and investment businesses. He was the top-selling salesman for his father's Nash car dealership when he left it in the early 1950s to pursue other business interests. In 1956, Ballard returned and took over the Ballard Motor Company from his father. During this period, he also served in the United States Army Reserve, resigning his commission as a First Lieutenant in 1957.

During the late 1950s, Ballard was recruited by the Ford Motor Company to become the first Edsel car dealer for Salt Lake City. According to Ballard, after praying for guidance, he had the "clear impression" not to sign the franchise. He did anyway and incurred a huge loss, "without doubt the darkest period" of his business career.

One highlight of Ballard's business career was his presidency of the Valley Music Hall in Bountiful, Utah, which offered family entertainment. There Ballard worked with Art Linkletter, Danny Thomas, Bob Cummings, and other Hollywood celebrities who were advisers to the enterprise. Although the music hall failed financially, investors recovered their money when the LDS Church purchased the building.

=== Keystone Securities Corporation ===
In 1961, Kay Stoker, a business partner of Ballard's, created a mining company called Shasta Mineral and Chemical Corporation and filed a registration statement with the Securities and Exchange Commission (SEC) declaring intent to offer public stock for the company. While processing the request, the SEC recommended that a separate company be created to handle issuance of stock, so Keystone Securities Corporation was established with Ballard as president. In November 1961 the SEC charged Shasta with fraud. Ballard attempted to withdraw Keystone Securities from the issue because he "could not be affiliated with anything that was having this claim of 'fraud' and 'misleading statements' associated with it." The SEC subsequently charged Keystone and Ballard with violating the Securities Exchange Act of 1934 and the Securities Act of 1933. The investigation centered around "manipulation and fraud."

The SEC completed its investigation in 1963 and withdrew its original charge of fraud but charged Keystone and Ballard with "aiding and abetting" fraud in Shasta. Without admitting or denying the charges, Keystone and Ballard settled the case by stipulating that the SEC could find them as having violated the acts through aiding and abetting Shasta. The SEC revoked the broker-dealer registration of Keystone as a result. In 1964 the SEC dropped the charges against Shasta. In a testimony before a Senate subcommittee in 1965, the lawyer for Keystone and Ballard asserted that the SEC charges against Ballard were solely "to determine whether an underwriter can be charged vicariously with any wrongdoing of the issuing company," even though "Keystone had not participated in the preparation of the registration statement or sold any stock pursuant to the proposed public offering" of Shasta. In 1966, a U.S. district court found the SEC guilty of acting in an arbitrary and capricious manner by announcing their charges against both Shasta and Keystone.

== Family ==
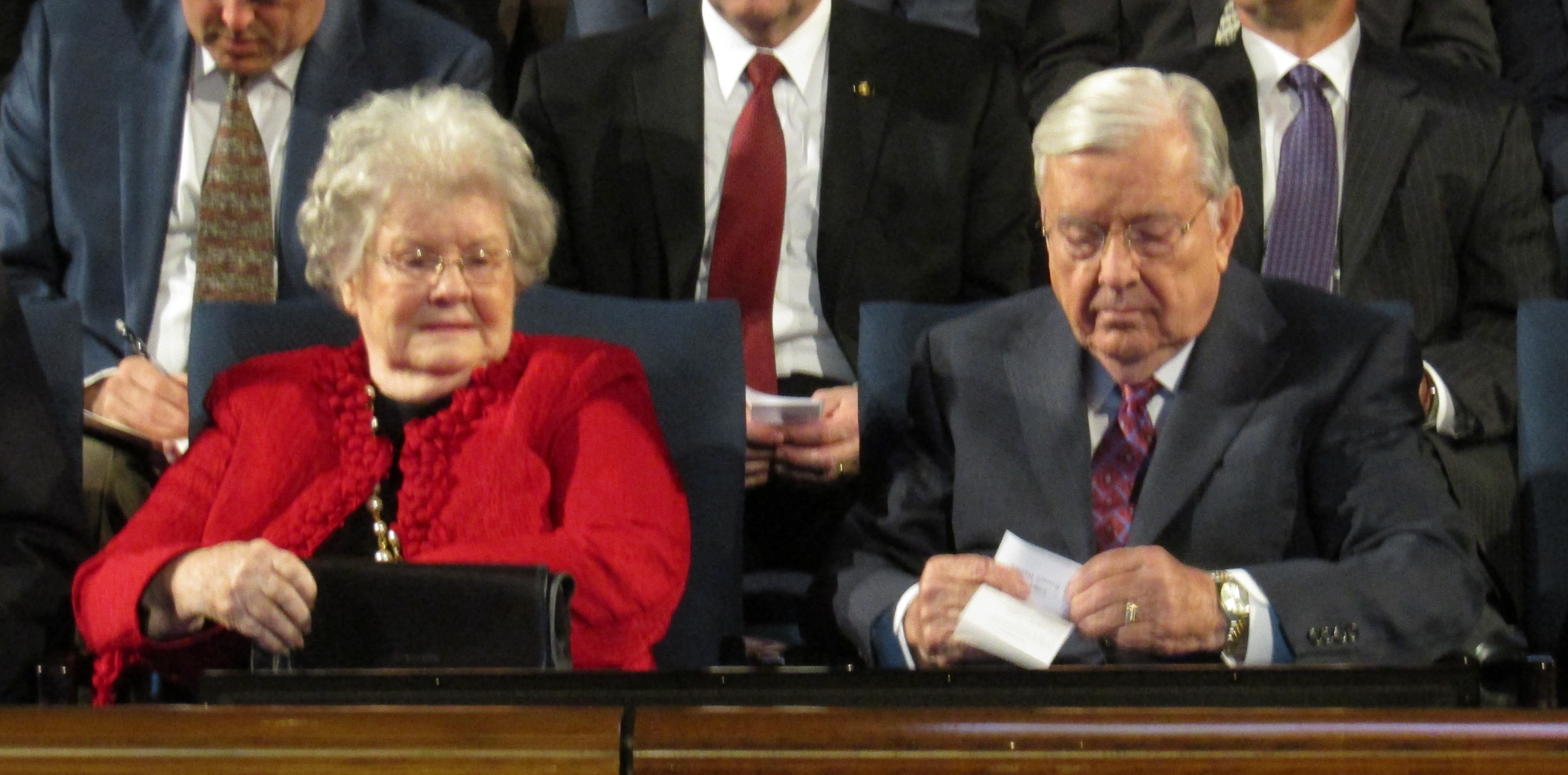
Ballard with his wife, Barbara, in 2017

On August 28, 1951, Ballard married Barbara Bowen in the Salt Lake Temple; they were the parents of seven children. One of their daughters, Brynn, is married to Peter R. Huntsman, who is the son of late billionaire industrialist Jon Huntsman Sr. and brother of Jon Huntsman Jr., former United States ambassador to Russia and China and former governor of Utah.

Barbara Bowen Ballard died on October 1, 2018.

== Works ==
Books

- Ballard, M. Russell (2009), Daughters of God, Salt Lake City: Deseret Book, ISBN 978-1-60641-043-1, OCLC 268547494
- —— (2002), As Women of God, Salt Lake City: Deseret Book, ISBN 978-1-57008-832-2, OCLC 51605089
- —— (2001), Staying the Course: Ten Keys to Gospel Commitment, Salt Lake City: Deseret Book, ISBN 978-1-57345-813-9, OCLC 232700082
- —— (2001), When Thou Art Converted: Continuing the Search for Happiness, Salt Lake City: Deseret Book, ISBN 978-1-57345-813-9, OCLC 47831370
- —— (1998), The law of sacrifice and What came from Kirtland, Classic talk series, Salt Lake City: Deseret Book, ISBN 978-1-57345-403-2, OCLC 40736766
- —— (1997), Counseling with Our Councils: Learning to Minister Together in the Church and in the Family, Salt Lake City: Deseret Book, ISBN 978-1-57345-209-0, OCLC 37606320
- —— (1993), Our Search for Happiness: An Invitation to Understand the Church of Jesus Christ of Latter-day Saints, Salt Lake City: Deseret Book, ISBN 978-0-87579-804-2, OCLC 28889507
- —— (1993), Suicide: Some Things We Know, and Some We Do Not, Salt Lake City: Deseret Book, ISBN 978-0-87579-766-3, OCLC 29378984

== Notes ==
The Church of Jesus Christ of Latter-day Saints titles
Preceded by Dallin H. Oaks	Quorum of the Twelve Apostles; October 10, 1985 – November 12, 2023	Succeeded by Joseph B. Wirthlin
