= List of presidents of the Church of Jesus Christ of Latter-day Saints =

This article lists the presidents of the Church of Jesus Christ of Latter-day Saints (LDS Church). Each of the included persons has served as president and been considered the prophet, seer, and revelator of the LDS Church.

No.	Portrait	President of the Church	Birth	Ordination	Death	Length
1		Joseph Smith	December 23, 1805	April 6, 1830 (aged 24) (de facto); January 25, 1832 (aged 26) (de jure)	June 27, 1844 (aged 38)	14 years, 2 months (de facto); 12 years, 5 months (de jure)
	Church led by Brigham Young as President of the Quorum of the Twelve Apostles.					3 years, 6 months
2		Brigham Young	June 1, 1801	December 27, 1847 (aged 46)	August 29, 1877 (aged 76)	29 years, 8 months
	Church led by John Taylor as President of the Quorum of the Twelve Apostles.					3 years, 1 month
3		John Taylor	November 1, 1808	October 10, 1880 (aged 71)	July 25, 1887 (aged 78)	6 years, 9 months
	Church led by Wilford Woodruff as President of the Quorum of the Twelve Apostles.					1 year, 8 months
4		Wilford Woodruff	March 1, 1807	April 7, 1889 (aged 82)	September 2, 1898 (aged 91)	9 years, 4 months
	Church led by Lorenzo Snow as President of the Quorum of the Twelve Apostles.					11 days
5		Lorenzo Snow	April 3, 1814	September 13, 1898 (aged 84)	October 10, 1901 (aged 87)	3 years, 1 month
	Church led by Joseph F. Smith as President of the Quorum of the Twelve Apostles.					7 days
6		Joseph F. Smith	November 13, 1838	October 17, 1901 (aged 62)	November 19, 1918 (aged 80)	17 years, 1 month
	Church led by Heber J. Grant as President of the Quorum of the Twelve Apostles.					4 days
7		Heber J. Grant	November 22, 1856	November 23, 1918 (aged 62)	May 14, 1945 (aged 88)	26 years, 5 months
	Church led by George Albert Smith as President of the Quorum of the Twelve Apostles.					7 days
8		George Albert Smith	April 4, 1870	May 21, 1945 (aged 75)	April 4, 1951 (aged 81)	5 years, 10 months
	Church led by David O. McKay as President of the Quorum of the Twelve Apostles.					5 days
9		David O. McKay	September 8, 1873	April 9, 1951 (aged 77)	January 18, 1970 (aged 96)	18 years, 9 months
	Church led by Joseph Fielding Smith as President of the Quorum of the Twelve Apostles.					5 days
10		Joseph Fielding Smith	July 19, 1876	January 23, 1970 (aged 93)	July 2, 1972 (aged 95)	2 years, 5 months
	Church led by Harold B. Lee as President of the Quorum of the Twelve Apostles.					5 days
11		Harold B. Lee	March 28, 1899	July 7, 1972 (aged 73)	December 26, 1973 (aged 74)	1 year, 5 months
	Church led by Spencer W. Kimball as President of the Quorum of the Twelve Apostles.					4 days
12		Spencer W. Kimball	March 28, 1895	December 30, 1973 (aged 78)	November 5, 1985 (aged 90)	11 years, 10 months
	Church led by Ezra Taft Benson as President of the Quorum of the Twelve Apostles.					5 days
13		Ezra Taft Benson	August 4, 1899	November 10, 1985 (aged 86)	May 30, 1994 (aged 94)	8 years, 6 months
	Church led by Howard W. Hunter as President of the Quorum of the Twelve Apostles.					6 days
14		Howard W. Hunter	November 14, 1907	June 5, 1994 (aged 86)	March 3, 1995 (aged 87)	9 months
	Church led by Gordon B. Hinckley as President of the Quorum of the Twelve Apostles.					9 days
15		Gordon B. Hinckley	June 23, 1910	March 12, 1995 (aged 84)	January 27, 2008 (aged 97)	12 years, 10 months
	Church led by Thomas S. Monson as President of the Quorum of the Twelve Apostles.					6 days
16		Thomas S. Monson	August 21, 1927	February 3, 2008 (aged 80)	January 2, 2018 (aged 90)	9 years, 11 months
	Church led by Russell M. Nelson as President of the Quorum of the Twelve Apostles.					12 days
17		Russell M. Nelson	September 9, 1924	January 14, 2018 (aged 93)	September 27, 2025 (aged 101)	7 years, 8 months
	Church led by Dallin H. Oaks as President of the Quorum of the Twelve Apostles.					17 days
18		Dallin H. Oaks	August 12, 1932	October 14, 2025 (aged 93)	Living; 94 years, 2 months	Current; 1 year

== See also ==
- Chronology of the First Presidency (LDS Church)
- Chronology of the Quorum of the Twelve Apostles (LDS Church)
- List of members of the Quorum of the Twelve Apostles (LDS Church)
