= Quorum of the Twelve Apostles (LDS Church) =

Governing body of LDS Church

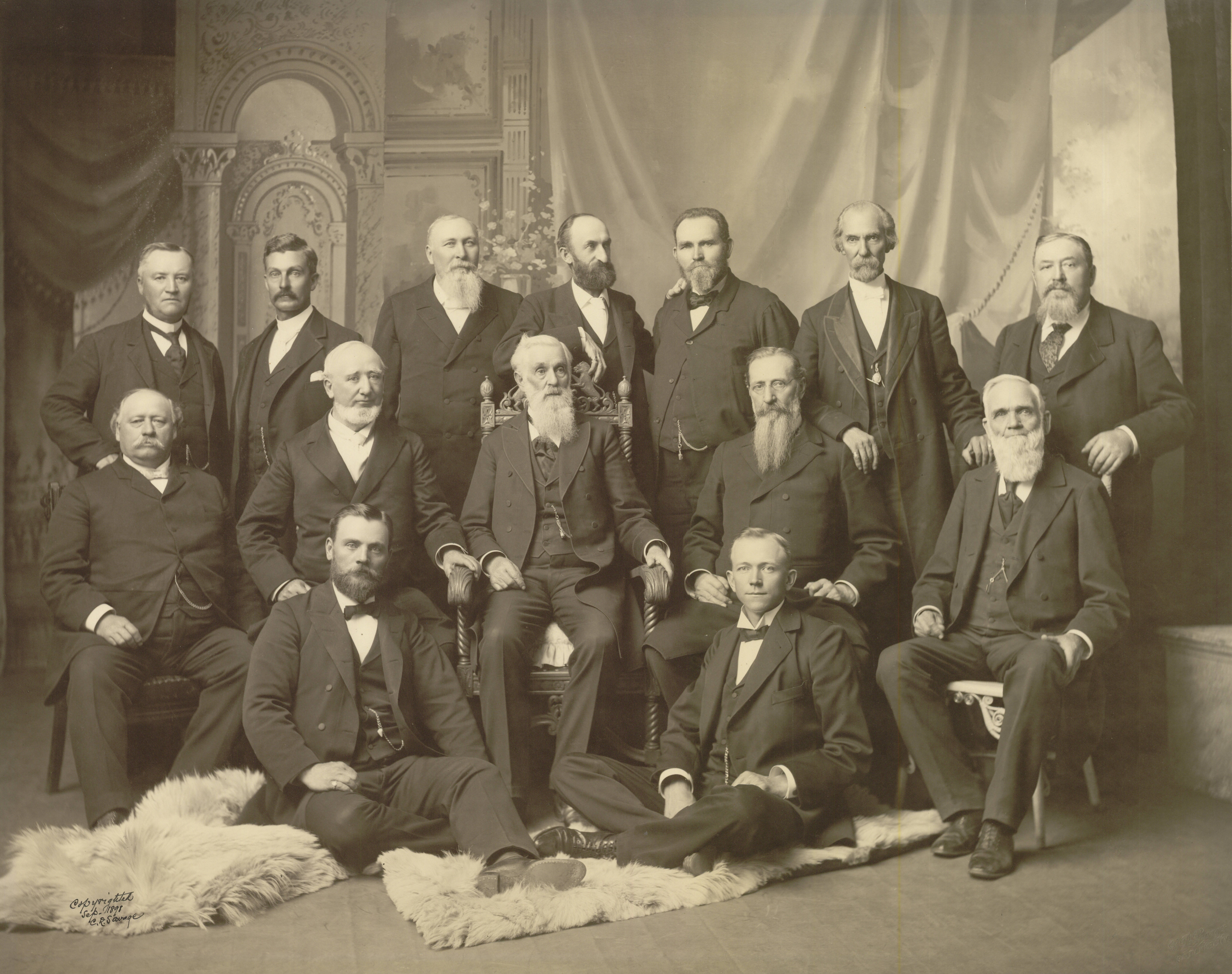
The First Presidency and the Quorum of the Twelve Apostles, September 1898.

In the Church of Jesus Christ of Latter-day Saints (LDS Church), the Quorum of the Twelve Apostles (also known as the Quorum of the Twelve, the Council of the Twelve Apostles, or simply the Twelve) is one of the governing bodies in the church hierarchy. Members of the Quorum of the Twelve Apostles are apostles, with the calling to be prophets, seers, and revelators, evangelical ambassadors, and special witnesses of Jesus Christ.

The quorum was first organized in 1835 and designated as a body of "traveling councilors" with jurisdiction outside areas where the church was formally organized, equal in authority to the First Presidency, the Seventy, the standing Presiding High Council, and the high councils of the various stakes. The jurisdiction of the Twelve was originally limited to areas of the world outside Zion or its stakes. After the apostles returned from their missions to England, Joseph Smith altered the responsibilities of the quorum: it was given charge of the affairs of the church, under direction of the First Presidency.

== History ==
The quorum was first organized in 1835. At the time of the death of Joseph Smith, the quorum president was Brigham Young. Young emphasized what he said was Smith's authorization that the Quorum of the Twelve should be the central governing body of the church after Smith's death.

In 1847, the Twelve reorganized the First Presidency with Young as church president, and the Twelve took on a supporting role within a chain of command under the First Presidency, a role which continues to the present day.

== Role of the quorum ==
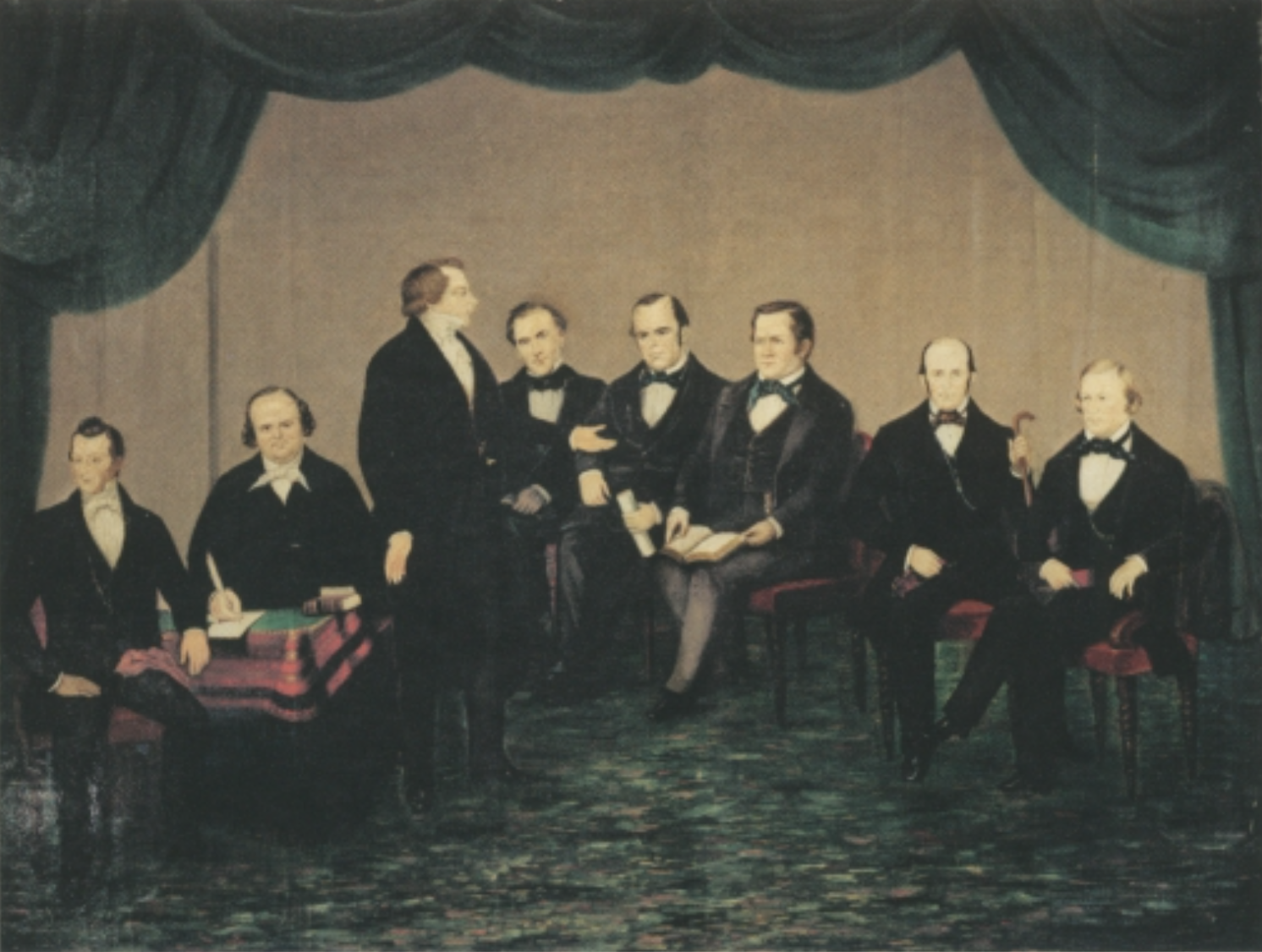
Joseph Smith addressing members of the quorum of the twelve. Hyrum Smith, Willard Richards, Joseph Smith, Orson Pratt, Parley P. Pratt, Orson Hyde, Heber C. Kimball, Brigham Young, c. 1843 – 1844.

The Quorum of the Twelve Apostles claims a leadership role second only to that of the First Presidency.

It is the Quorum's duty to choose a successor upon the death of a church president. The LDS Church's Quorum of the Twelve Apostles has some general similarities to the College of Cardinals of the Catholic Church. However, there are some differences, due in part to the President and the Twelve having life tenure, which may lead to an older or infirm church president; it also provides considerable training of apostles to become the president. Church policy decisions are made unanimously, with consultation among the First Presidency, the Quorum of the Twelve, and where appropriate, the Seventy, each of which has its own responsibility. Effort is made to ensure that the organizations are united in purpose and policy.

Each member of the quorum is accepted by the church as an apostle, as well as a "prophet, seer, and revelator." Thus, each apostle is considered to hold the "keys of the priesthood", "the rights of presidency, or the power given to man by God to direct, control, and govern God's priesthood on earth." Individually and collectively, the Twelve Apostles hold the keys and have conferred the authority to exercise all of the keys upon the church president. Thus, as outlined in the Doctrine and Covenants, only the church president is entitled to receive revelation or dictate policy for the church.

A major role of the Twelve is to appoint a successor when the President of the Church dies. Shortly after this occurs, the apostles meet in a room of the Salt Lake Temple to appoint a successor. Invariably the successor has been the most senior member of the Twelve, with seniority determined by the longest continuous duration of service. The apostles lay their hands on his head and ordain him and set him apart as President of the Church. The president then chooses two counselors in the First Presidency, who are high priests (usually apostles). The second most senior surviving apostle becomes the President of the Quorum of the Twelve. In cases when the President of the Quorum is simultaneously called to be a counselor in the First Presidency, or is unable to serve due to health considerations, an acting president is called to fill the position. This has invariably been the most senior member of the quorum who is not a member of the First Presidency.

As vacancies arise within the quorum, the Twelve and counselors in the First Presidency are invited to meet and counsel together in prayer in order to recommend to the President of the Church who will be called to fill the vacancy. The final decision rests with the President of the Church, but is formally voted on by the Twelve and the counselors in the First Presidency. The chosen man is generally ordained an apostle by the President of the Church, a counselor in the First Presidency, or the President of the Twelve. Depending on circumstances, this may occur before or after a sustaining vote is held at a church general conference. Any Melchizedek priesthood holder is eligible to be called as an apostle. Generally, new apostles have considerable experience in church government and have served faithfully as bishops, stake presidents, mission presidents, or seventies.

As a matter of policy, apostles are generally asked to retire from their professional careers and devote themselves to full-time church service, including memberships of boards and professional organizations. Some apostles receive assignments to become members of boards of church-owned for-profit corporations and trustees of the church's educational institutions. Some exceptions have been made to this rule, as when quorum member Ezra Taft Benson was permitted to serve as United States Secretary of Agriculture from 1953 to 1961 and when quorum member Reed Smoot was permitted to serve in the United States Senate from 1903 to 1933. The calling of an apostle is typically a lifetime calling.

== Current members ==
Name:	Dieter F. Uchtdorf
Born:	November 6, 1940 (age 86)
Positions:	Acting President of the Quorum of the Twelve Apostles, called by Dallin H. Oaks, January 8, 2026 – present Quorum of the Twelve Apostles, January 2, 2018 – present Second Counselor in the First Presidency, called by Thomas S. Monson, February 3, 2008 – January 2, 2018; Quorum of the Twelve Apostles, called by Gordon B. Hinckley, October 2, 2004 – February 3, 2008; LDS Church Apostle, called by Gordon B. Hinckley, October 7, 2004; Presidency of the Seventy, called by Gordon B. Hinckley, August 15, 2002 – October 2, 2004; First Quorum of the Seventy, called by Gordon B. Hinckley, April 7, 1996 – October 2, 2004; Second Quorum of the Seventy, called by Ezra Taft Benson, April 2, 1994 – April 7, 1996
Notes:	The first apostle from Germany.
Name:	David A. Bednar
Born:	June 15, 1952 (age 74)
Positions:	Quorum of the Twelve Apostles, called by Gordon B. Hinckley, October 2, 2004; LDS Church Apostle, called by Gordon B. Hinckley, October 7, 2004
Notes:	Final president of Ricks College and first president of Brigham Young University–Idaho.
Name:	Quentin L. Cook
Born:	September 8, 1940 (age 86)
Positions:	Quorum of the Twelve Apostles, called by Gordon B. Hinckley, October 6, 2007; LDS Church Apostle, called by Gordon B. Hinckley, October 11, 2007; Presidency of the Seventy, called by Gordon B. Hinckley, August 1, 2007 – October 6, 2007; First Quorum of the Seventy, called by Gordon B. Hinckley, April 5, 1998 – October 6, 2007; Second Quorum of the Seventy, called by Gordon B. Hinckley, April 6, 1996 – April 5, 1998
Name:	Neil L. Andersen
Born:	August 9, 1951 (age 75)
Positions:	Quorum of the Twelve Apostles, called by Thomas S. Monson, April 4, 2009; LDS Church Apostle, called by Thomas S. Monson, April 9, 2009; Presidency of the Seventy, called by Gordon B. Hinckley, August 15, 2005 – April 4, 2009; First Quorum of the Seventy, called by Ezra Taft Benson, April 3, 1993 – April 4, 2009
Name:	Ronald A. Rasband
Born:	February 6, 1951 (age 75)
Positions:	Quorum of the Twelve Apostles, called by Thomas S. Monson, October 3, 2015; LDS Church Apostle, called by Thomas S. Monson, October 8, 2015; Presidency of the Seventy, called by Gordon B. Hinckley, August 15, 2005 – October 3, 2015; First Quorum of the Seventy, called by Gordon B. Hinckley, April 1, 2000 – October 3, 2015
Name:	Gary E. Stevenson
Born:	August 6, 1955 (age 71)
Positions:	Quorum of the Twelve Apostles, called by Thomas S. Monson, October 3, 2015; LDS Church Apostle, called by Thomas S. Monson, October 8, 2015; Presiding Bishop, called by Thomas S. Monson, March 31, 2012 – October 9, 2015; First Quorum of the Seventy, called by Thomas S. Monson, April 5, 2008 – March 31, 2012
Name:	Dale G. Renlund
Born:	November 13, 1952 (age 74)
Positions:	Quorum of the Twelve Apostles, called by Thomas S. Monson, October 3, 2015; LDS Church Apostle, called by Thomas S. Monson, October 8, 2015; First Quorum of the Seventy, called by Thomas S. Monson, April 4, 2009 – October 3, 2015
Name:	Gerrit W. Gong
Born:	December 23, 1953 (age 72)
Positions:	Quorum of the Twelve Apostles, called by Russell M. Nelson, March 31, 2018; LDS Church Apostle, called by Russell M. Nelson, April 5, 2018; Presidency of the Seventy, called by Thomas S. Monson, October 6, 2015 – March 31, 2018; First Quorum of the Seventy, called by Thomas S. Monson, April 3, 2010 – March 31, 2018
Notes:	The first apostle of Asian descent.
Name:	Ulisses Soares
Born:	October 2, 1958 (age 68)
Positions:	Quorum of the Twelve Apostles, called by Russell M. Nelson, March 31, 2018; LDS Church Apostle, called by Russell M. Nelson, April 5, 2018; Presidency of the Seventy, called by Thomas S. Monson, January 6, 2013 – March 31, 2018; First Quorum of the Seventy, called by Gordon B. Hinckley, April 2, 2005 – March 31, 2018
Notes:	The first apostle from Brazil.
Name:	Patrick Kearon
Born:	July 18, 1961 (age 65)
Positions:	Quorum of the Twelve Apostles, called by Russell M. Nelson, December 7, 2023; LDS Church Apostle, called by Russell M. Nelson, December 7, 2023; Presidency of the Seventy, called by Thomas S. Monson, August 2017 – December 7, 2023; First Quorum of the Seventy, called by Thomas S. Monson, April 3, 2010 – December 7, 2023
Name:	Gérald Caussé
Born:	May 20, 1963 (age 63)
Positions:	Quorum of the Twelve Apostles, called by Dallin H. Oaks, November 6, 2025; LDS Church Apostle, called by Dallin H. Oaks, November 6, 2025; Presiding Bishop, called by Thomas S. Monson, October 9, 2015 – November 6, 2025; First Counselor in the Presiding Bishopric, called by Gary E. Stevenson, March 31, 2012 – October 9, 2015; First Quorum of the Seventy, called by Thomas S. Monson, April 5, 2008 – March 31, 2012
Notes:	The first apostle from France.
Name:	Clark G. Gilbert
Born:	June 18, 1970 (age 56)
Positions:	Quorum of the Twelve Apostles, called by Dallin H. Oaks, February 12, 2026; LDS Church Apostle, called by Dallin H. Oaks, February 12, 2026; General Authority Seventy, called by Russell M. Nelson, April 3, 2021 – February 12, 2026

== See also ==
- List of members of the Quorum of the Twelve Apostles (LDS Church)
- List of general authorities (LDS Church)
- Presiding Bishop (LDS Church)
- Regional Representative of the Twelve
- Twelve Apostles
- Chronology of the Quorum of the Twelve Apostles (LDS Church)
