= Setting apart =

LDS church ritual

Setting apart is a ritual or priesthood action in the Church of Jesus Christ of Latter-day Saints where a person is formally blessed to carry out a specific calling or responsibility in the church.

Once a person has accepted the responsibility of holding a church calling and has been accepted by the members for that position, one or more Melchizedek priesthood holders "set apart" the person to serve in that calling. The priesthood holders accomplish this by giving the person a priesthood blessing by the laying on of hands. If the recipient is being set apart as a president of a priesthood quorum, including a stake president or a bishop, "priesthood keys" are also conferred upon them.

Generally, only general authorities and local leaders of stakes, wards, missions, districts, and branches may set apart a member to serve in a position. When a person is released from serving in a calling, there is no ordinance comparable to setting apart that is used to signify the end of a person's service.

A setting apart is different from a priesthood ordination. A person is ordained to a specific priesthood office, such as apostle, elder, high priest or deacon, but a person is set apart to callings such as counselor in the First Presidency, President of the Quorum of the Twelve Apostles, stake president, temple president, mission president, high councilor, or member of a quorum presidency or auxiliary organization presidency (such as the Relief Society or Sunday School). A bishop must be ordained to the priesthood offices of high priest and bishop and is then set apart as the bishop of a specific ward. A stake patriarch is ordained to the priesthood office of patriarch and is then set apart as the patriarch of a specific stake.
