= Acting President of the Quorum of the Twelve Apostles =

Leadership position in the Church of Jesus Christ of Latter-day Saints

Acting President of the Quorum of the Twelve Apostles is a priesthood calling in the Church of Jesus Christ of Latter-day Saints (LDS Church).

Generally, the position of Acting President of the Quorum of the Twelve Apostles is filled when the president of the Quorum of the Twelve Apostles is serving as a counselor in the church's First Presidency. In these cases, the man having this calling is the most senior apostle not serving in the First Presidency. A person may be also called as the acting president when the quorum president is unable to perform his duties due to ill health or other circumstances.

The formal calling of Acting President of the Quorum has been held nine times by eight men: Rudger Clawson, Joseph Fielding Smith, Spencer W. Kimball, Howard W. Hunter, Boyd K. Packer, M. Russell Ballard, Jeffrey R. Holland, and Dieter F. Uchtdorf.

Additionally, two earlier apostles—Orson Hyde and Brigham Young Jr.—have acted as the quorum president when they were not the second-most senior apostle in the church, and therefore may be said to have played the role of an acting president of the quorum before this specific title was created by the church.

== Duties ==
As the acting quorum president, this person performs all the duties normally performed by the quorum president. Primarily, these duties consist of presiding at and conducting the weekly quorum meetings in the Salt Lake Temple; making decisions about the particular assignments to be made to quorum members; and coordinating the quorum's work with the First Presidency, the Quorums of the Seventy, and the Presiding Bishopric.

When adherents refer to the acting president of the Quorum of the Twelve, his name is usually prefaced by the honorific title "President".

== List of acting presidents ==
Acting President	President	Dates	Justification	Reason tenure ended
Rudger Clawson	Anthon H. Lund	23 November 1918 – 17 March 1921	Quorum president Lund became a counselor in the First Presidency to Heber J. Grant	Death of Lund
Joseph Fielding Smith	David O. McKay	8 August 1950 – 4 April 1951	Quorum president George F. Richards died, and new quorum president McKay was a counselor in the First Presidency to George Albert Smith	Death of George Albert Smith and dissolution of the First Presidency, which resulted in McKay returning to the Quorum
Spencer W. Kimball	Harold B. Lee	23 January 1970 – 2 July 1972	Quorum president Lee became a counselor in the First Presidency to Joseph Fielding Smith	Death of Joseph Fielding Smith and dissolution of the First Presidency, which resulted in Lee returning to the Quorum
Howard W. Hunter	Marion G. Romney	10 November 1985 – 20 May 1988	Quorum president Ezra Taft Benson became President of the Church, and new quorum president Romney was unable to serve due to ill health. Hunter is the only person to serve as acting president with the actual president still a member of the quorum.	Death of Romney
Boyd K. Packer	Gordon B. Hinckley	5 June 1994 – 3 March 1995	Quorum president Hinckley and second in seniority, Thomas S. Monson, became counselors in the First Presidency to Howard W. Hunter	Death of Hunter and dissolution of the First Presidency, which resulted in Hinckley returning to the Quorum
Boyd K. Packer	Thomas S. Monson	12 March 1995 – 27 January 2008	Quorum president Monson became a counselor in the First Presidency to Hinckley. Packer is the only person to serve two separate terms as acting president.	Death of Hinckley and dissolution of the First Presidency, which resulted in Monson returning to the Quorum
M. Russell Ballard	Dallin H. Oaks	14 January 2018 – 12 November 2023	Quorum president Oaks became a counselor in the First Presidency to Russell M. Nelson	His death. Ballard is the only acting president to die in office.
Jeffrey R. Holland	Dallin H. Oaks	15 November 2023 – September 27, 2025	Acting president Ballard died and quorum president Oaks was still a counselor in the First Presidency	Death of Nelson and dissolution of the First Presidency, which resulted in Oaks returning to the Quorum
Dieter F. Uchtdorf	Henry B. Eyring	8 January 2026 – present	Quorum president Jeffrey R. Holland died, and new quorum president Eyring was already a counselor in the First Presidency to Dallin H. Oaks,	

== Pre-1918 acting presidents ==
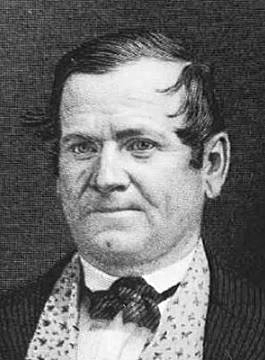
Orson Hyde

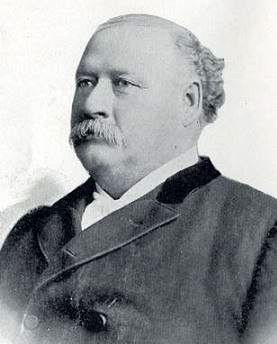
Brigham Young, Jr.

- Orson Hyde (27 December 1847 – 22 June 1868): When senior apostle Brigham Young became president of the church on 27 December 1847, the next senior apostle, Heber C. Kimball, was asked by Young to be one of the counselors in the First Presidency. This left Orson Hyde as the most senior member of the Quorum of the Twelve. According to current church practices, Kimball should have been called as president of the Quorum, with Hyde as acting president. However, this procedure was not followed, and Hyde was simply called as President of the Quorum. This created a historical anomaly whereby Hyde served as the president of the Quorum (not acting president) while being the third most senior apostle until Kimball's death on 22 June 1868.
- Brigham Young, Jr. (9 December 1899 – 10 October 1901): was ordained an apostle in 1864, but was not appointed to the Quorum of the Twelve until 1868. When Lorenzo Snow became President of the Church in 1898, Brigham Young, Jr. was the most senior apostle based on date of ordination. However, in 1900, the First Presidency changed seniority in the Twelve to be based not on date of ordination, but on length of uninterrupted membership in that quorum. This placed George Q. Cannon and Joseph F. Smith ahead of Young in seniority. However, since Cannon and Smith were both members of the First Presidency, Young continued serving as President of the Twelve. Following today's procedure, Cannon would have served as quorum president until his death, followed by Smith until his call as President of the Church, with Young as Acting President during both tenures. Instead, Young remained President of the Twelve until Snow died in 1901. At that time, Smith briefly became President of the Twelve before being set apart as President of the Church. Since this left Young as the most senior member of the Twelve, he was reinstated as its president.
