= President of the Quorum of the Twelve Apostles (LDS Church) =

Priesthood calling

President of the Quorum of the Twelve Apostles is a priesthood calling in the Church of Jesus Christ of Latter-day Saints (LDS Church). Normally, the president of the Quorum of the Twelve is the most senior apostle in the church, aside from its president. When the church president dies, the president of the Quorum of the Twelve Apostles succeeds him. There have been twenty-nine men who have served as president of the Twelve (one of whom served two non-consecutive terms). Of these, seventeen subsequently become the church president. As of December 27, 2025, Henry B. Eyring is the quorum president. With Eyring serving in the First Presidency, Dieter F. Uchtdorf was set apart as acting president on January 8, 2026.

== History of the presidency of the Quorum of the Twelve ==
When the church's president dies, the First Presidency automatically dissolves. The Quorum of the Twelve Apostles becomes the highest leadership body, and its president becomes the church's most senior leader. Following the death of church president Joseph Smith in 1844, Brigham Young was the quorum president, and he persuaded the majority of church members that Smith's death left him and not Sidney Rigdon, who had been Smith's first counselor in the First Presidency, as the senior church leader. Smith had reportedly taught the apostles, "Where I am not, there is no First Presidency over the Twelve."

In 1847, the Quorum of the Twelve reconstituted the First Presidency, with Young as church president. During Young's presidency, seniority within the Quorum of the Twelve was formalized to mean "continuous service as an Apostle since being ordained as one of the Twelve". The original apostles of 1835 had been ranked by age, and two of them had been excommunicated and later restored to fellowship. With this rule in place, upon the death of Young, John Taylor led the church, first as quorum president and, after 1880, as president of the Church. Wilford Woodruff became president of the Twelve.

After Taylor died in 1887, Woodruff did not reorganize the First Presidency until 1889. But before his own death in 1898, he advised the Quorum of the Twelve that "in all future time, when the president of the church should die and thereby the First Presidency become disorganized, it would be the duty of the proper authorities of the church to proceed at once without any unnecessary delay, to reorganize the First Presidency." Snow followed this advice and since then every interval between the death of the president of the church and the ordination of a new president has been less than two weeks, long enough to complete the funeral services and allow for the Quorum of the Twelve to nominate and sustain the president of the twelve as the new church president. When the president of the twelve becomes the president of the church, the next apostle in seniority becomes the new president of the twelve.

== Duties ==
The president of the Quorum of the Twelve Apostles is the priesthood leader of the quorum members. As such, all quorum members report directly to him. The president's other duties consist of presiding at and conducting weekly quorum meetings in the Salt Lake Temple; making decisions about assignments to be made to quorum members; speaking on behalf of the quorum to members of the church and the media; scheduling twice-annual conferences for each stake and district in the church; and acting as a liaison in coordinating the work of the quorum with the First Presidency, the Quorums of the Seventy, and the Presiding Bishopric.

When adherents refer to the president of the Quorum of the Twelve, his name is usually prefaced by the honorific title "president".

== Acting president ==
If the president of the Quorum of the Twelve Apostles is serving as a counselor in the First Presidency, he retains that title but is not numbered among the twelve. The most senior apostle who is not in the First Presidency is then named as acting president of the Quorum of the Twelve Apostles. The acting president assumes all of the duties that would normally rest upon the president of the quorum. The title of acting president was first used in 1918 for Rudger Clawson. The position has also been used during times of infirmity of a president of the twelve: for example, Howard W. Hunter was acting president for the infirm Marion G. Romney from 1985 to 1988.

Boyd K. Packer was the acting president of the Quorum of the Twelve Apostles from 1994 to 2008 when Gordon B. Hinckley and Thomas S. Monson were quorum presidents but were serving in the First Presidency.

On January 16, 2018, with quorum president Dallin H. Oaks serving as a counselor in the First Presidency, M. Russell Ballard was announced as acting president. After Ballard's death on November 12, 2023, Jeffrey R. Holland was set apart as the new acting president on November 15. He served as acting president until the death of church president Russell M. Nelson on September 27, 2025, which dissolved the First Presidency and returned Oaks to the quorum.

Upon the reorganization of the First Presidency (with Oaks as church president) on October 14, 2025, Holland was the quorum president before his own death on December 27, 2025. With new quorum president Henry B. Eyring serving as a counselor in the First Presidency, Dieter F. Uchtdorf was set apart as acting president on January 8, 2026.

== List of presidents of the Quorum of the Twelve ==
No.	Portrait	Name	Tenure (reason for end)	Notes
1		Thomas B. Marsh	14 February 1835 – 14 April 1840 (excommunicated)	He was excommunicated for apostasy.
2		Brigham Young	14 April 1840 – 27 December 1847 (became church president)	Young was not formally set apart as Quorum president until 14 April 1840. He assumed church leadership in 1844 and formally became church president in 1847.
3		Orson Hyde	27 December 1847 – 10 April 1875 (change in seniority)	Hyde was Quorum president because the more senior apostle, Heber C. Kimball, was a member of the First Presidency. (Under current practice, Hyde would have served as acting president until Kimball's death in 1868 and succeeded as quorum president after that.); In 1875 church president Brigham Young changed the rule of seniority in the Quorum: the senior member was to be the person with the longest uninterrupted service in the Quorum, as opposed to the person who entered the Quorum at the earliest date. Hyde's seniority in the Quorum was reduced as he had been disfellowshipped for a brief period of time in 1839.
4		John Taylor	10 April 1875 – 10 October 1880 (became church president)	He became quorum president when church president Brigham Young changed the rule of seniority in the Quorum. Taylor was not formally set apart until 6 October 1877, about a month after the death of Brigham Young. His tenure as Quorum president ended when he formally assumed the church presidency in 1880.
5		Wilford Woodruff	10 October 1880 – 7 April 1889 (became church president)	It is unclear if he was ever formally set apart as Quorum president.
6		Lorenzo Snow	7 April 1889 – 13 September 1898 (became church president)	
7		Franklin D. Richards	13 September 1898 – 9 December 1899 (died)	
8		Brigham Young, Jr.	9 December 1899 – 10 October 1901	He served as quorum president because the more senior apostles, George Q. Cannon and Joseph F. Smith, were members of the First Presidency (1898–1901). (Under current practice, Young would have served as acting president.) When church president Lorenzo Snow died in 1901, Joseph F. Smith returned to the Quorum of the Twelve as its President.
9		Joseph F. Smith	10 October 1901 – 17 October 1901 (became church president)	Smith had the shortest tenure as quorum president. It is unclear whether he was formally set apart as such.
10		Brigham Young, Jr.	17 October 1901 – 11 April 1903 (died)	Young had previously been quorum president (1898–1901) until Joseph F. Smith returned to the Quorum. When Smith became church president, Young resumed his position as Quorum president and was set apart on the same day. He is the only quorum president to serve non-consecutive terms.
11		Francis M. Lyman	11 April 1903 – 18 November 1916 (died)	Lyman was not officially set apart as quorum president until 6 October 1903.
12		Heber J. Grant	18 November 1916 – 23 November 1918 (became church president)	
13		Anthon H. Lund	23 November 1918 – 2 March 1921 (died)	Lund was a member of the First Presidency during his entire tenure as quorum president. Rudger Clawson served as acting president during that time.
14		Rudger Clawson	2 March 1921 – 21 June 1943 (died)	Longest tenure as quorum president. He previously served as acting president while Anthon H. Lund was a member of the First Presidency (1918–1921).
15		George Albert Smith	21 June 1943 – 21 May 1945 (became church president)	
16		George F. Richards	21 May 1945 – 8 August 1950 (died)	
17		David O. McKay	8 August 1950 – 9 April 1951 (became church president)	He was a member of the First Presidency until 4 April 1951. Joseph Fielding Smith served as acting president during that time.
18		Joseph Fielding Smith	9 April 1951 – 23 January 1970 (became church president)	He was a member of the First Presidency until 8 January 1970, but remained a member of the Quorum of the Twelve during this time. He previously served as acting president while David O. McKay was a member of the First Presidency (1950–1951).
19		Harold B. Lee	23 January 1970 – 7 July 1972 (became church president)	He was a member of the First Presidency until 2 July 1972. Spencer W. Kimball served as acting president during that time.
20		Spencer W. Kimball	7 July 1972 – 30 December 1973 (became church president)	He previously served as acting president while Harold B. Lee was a member of the First Presidency (1970–1972).
21		Ezra Taft Benson	30 December 1973 – 10 November 1985 (became church president)	
22		Marion G. Romney	10 November 1985 – 20 May 1988 (died)	Due to Romney's ill health, Howard W. Hunter served as acting president for the entirety of Romney's tenure as quorum president.
23		Howard W. Hunter	20 May 1988 – 5 June 1994 (became church president)	He previously served as acting president due to Marion G. Romney's failing health and became quorum president upon Romney's death. Hunter was officially set apart two weeks later, on 2 June 1988.
24		Gordon B. Hinckley	5 June 1994 – 12 March 1995 (became church president)	He was a member of the First Presidency until 3 March 1995. Boyd K. Packer served as acting president during that time.
25		Thomas S. Monson	12 March 1995 – 3 February 2008 (became church president)	He was a member of the First Presidency until 27 January 2008. Boyd K. Packer served as acting president during that time.
26		Boyd K. Packer	3 February 2008 – 3 July 2015 (died)	He previously served as acting president when the more senior apostles, Gordon B. Hinckley (1994–1995) and Thomas S. Monson (1994–1995 and 1995–2008), were members of the First Presidency.
27		Russell M. Nelson	3 July 2015 – 14 January 2018 (became church president)	The second most senior apostle upon Boyd K. Packer's death, Nelson became quorum president. He was formally set apart on 15 July 2015.
28		Dallin H. Oaks	14 January 2018 – 14 October 2025 (became church president)	He was a member of the First Presidency until 27 September 2025. M. Russell Ballard served as acting president from January 14, 2018 until his death on November 12, 2023. Jeffrey R. Holland served as acting president from November 15, 2023 until the First Presidency was dissolved on September 27, 2025.
29		Jeffrey R. Holland	14 October 2025 – 27 December 2025 (died)	He previously served as acting president while Dallin H. Oaks was a member of the First Presidency (2023–2025).
30		Henry B. Eyring	27 December 2025 – present	A member of the First Presidency for the entirety of his tenure as quorum president. Dieter F. Uchtdorf serves as acting president.
