= Apostle (Latter Day Saints) =

Priesthood office of high authority in the Latter Day Saint movement

In the Latter Day Saint movement, an apostle is a "special witness of the name of Jesus Christ who is sent to teach the principles of salvation to others." In many Latter Day Saint churches, an apostle is a priesthood office of high authority within the church hierarchy. In many churches, apostles may be members of the Quorum of the Twelve and First Presidency of the church. In most Latter Day Saint churches, modern-day apostles are considered to have the same status and authority as the Biblical apostles.

In the Latter Day Saint tradition, apostles and prophets are believed to be the foundation of the church, Jesus Christ himself being the chief cornerstone. The "Articles of Faith", written by Joseph Smith, mentions apostles:

"We believe in the same organization that existed in the Primitive Church, namely, apostles, prophets, pastors, teachers, evangelists, and so forth."

== History ==
Joseph Smith and Oliver Cowdery were both designated apostles by 1830. The founding articles and covenants of the Church of Christ stated an "apostle is an elder" and, as such, had the same responsibilities as an elder, though an apostle's primary responsibility was preaching. Other church members with proselytizing responsibilities were also referred to as apostles. A June 1829 revelation appointed Cowdery and David Whitmer to designate twelve apostles.

Subsequently, the Quorum of the Twelve Apostles was organized February 14, 1835, with the selection of twelve men. After the appointment of a quorum of apostles, the term became increasingly restricted to members of that quorum, but members of the quorums of the seventy were also sometimes referred to as apostles.

== Apostles in The Church of Jesus Christ of Latter-day Saints ==
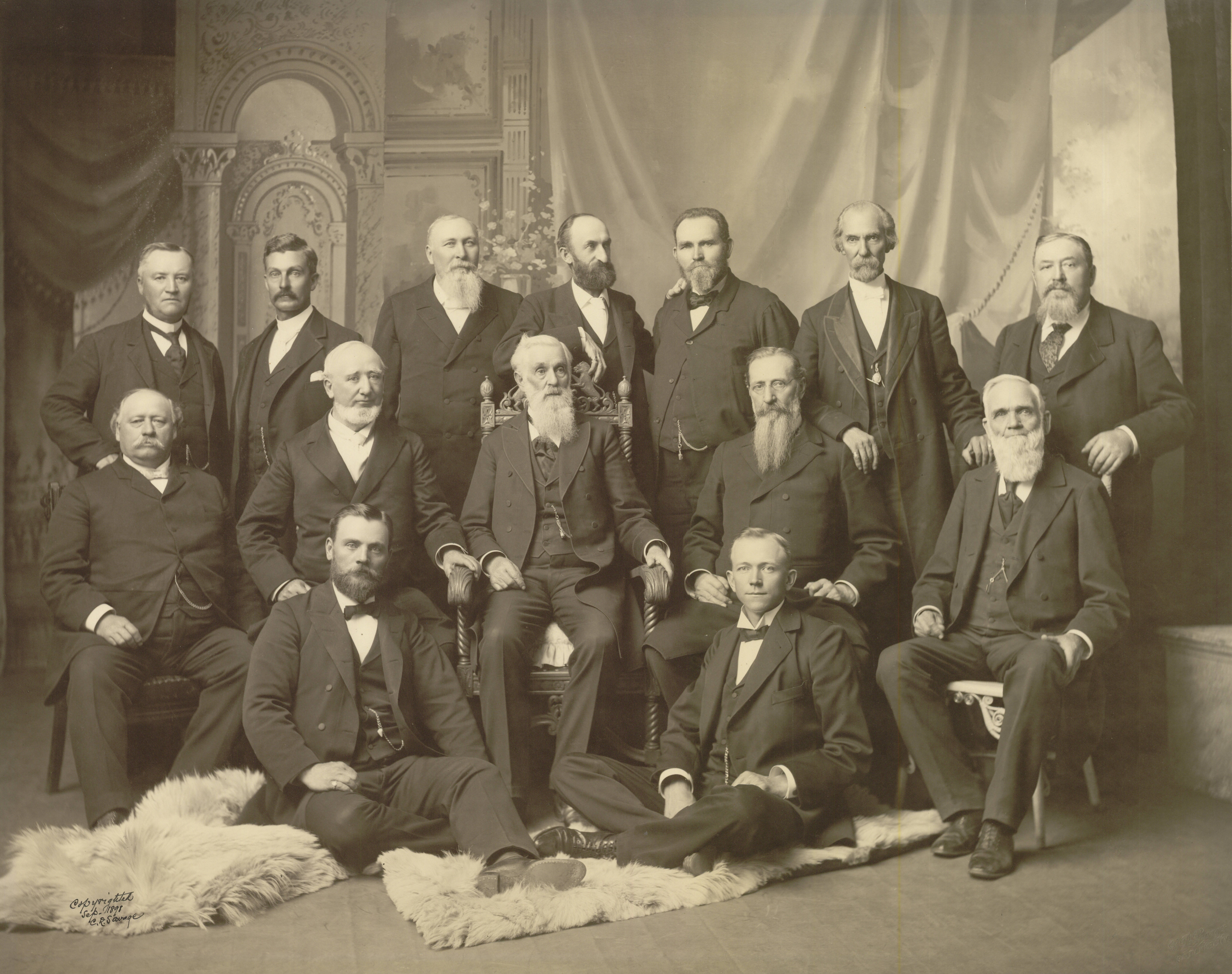
The First Presidency and the Twelve Apostles in September 1898.

In the Church of Jesus Christ of Latter-day Saints (LDS Church), apostle is the highest priesthood office of the Melchizedek priesthood. The President of the Church is always an apostle, as are the members of the Quorum of the Twelve Apostles. In practice, counselors in the First Presidency are almost always apostles as well. There are usually at least twelve apostles in the LDS Church, though at times there has been as many as 21.

Some apostles have been ordained to that office without being included within the Quorum of the Twelve. Alvin R. Dyer, for example, was ordained an apostle in 1967; although he served as a counselor in the First Presidency between 1968 and 1970, upon the death of David O. McKay, he returned to his previous position as an Assistant to the Quorum of the Twelve. Joseph Angell Young was ordained an apostle in 1864 but was never a member of either the Quorum of the Twelve Apostles or the First Presidency. Joseph F. Smith, Brigham Young, Jr., and Sylvester Q. Cannon had each been ordained as apostles before eventually being called into the Quorum of the Twelve.

Due to a precedent established after the succession crisis which occurred after the death of Joseph Smith, the senior apostle, the President of the Quorum of the Twelve, becomes the new President of the Church upon the death of his predecessor. On these occasions, the president of the Quorum of the Twelve is formally sustained at the next church general conference as the "prophet, seer, and revelator" and president of the church. The next most senior apostle becomes president of the Quorum of the Twelve.

Following their calling to the apostleship, members of the Quorum are sustained in general conference as apostles and prophets, seers, and revelators. This procedure also takes place at other meetings of church members such as ward and stake conferences. Each member of the First Presidency and Quorum of the Twelve is sustained by name.

Usually, the president of the church ordains a new apostle, although any other apostle may ordain a person to the priesthood office. If the president of the church is unable due to infirmity to ordain a new apostle, the ordination is usually performed by an apostle who is a member of the First Presidency or by the president of the Quorum of the Twelve.

The Bible Dictionary of the LDS Church defines apostle as meaning "one sent forth" and elaborates as follows:

[Apostle] was the title Jesus gave (Luke 6:13) to the twelve whom he chose and ordained (John 15:16) to be his closest disciples during his ministry on earth, and whom he sent forth to represent him after his ascension into heaven. The calling of an apostle is to be a special witness of the name of Jesus Christ in all the world, particularly of his divinity and of his bodily resurrection from the dead (Acts 1:22; D&C 107:23). Twelve men with this high calling constitute an administrative council in the work of the ministry. When a vacancy occurred with the death of Judas Iscariot, Matthias was divinely appointed to that special office as a member of the council (Acts 1:15–26). Today twelve men with this same divine calling and ordination constitute the Quorum of the Twelve Apostles in The Church of Jesus Christ of Latter-day Saints. The title was also applied to others who, though not of the number of the original twelve, yet were called to serve as special witnesses of the Lord. Paul repeatedly spoke of himself as an apostle (Rom. 1:1; 1 Cor. 1:1; 1 Cor. 9:1; Gal. 1:1). He applied the titles to James, the Lord's brother (Gal. 1:19), and also to Barnabas (1 Cor. 9:5–6; cf. Acts 14:4,14). The New Testament does not inform us whether these three brethren also served in the council of the Twelve as vacancies occurred therein, or whether they were apostles strictly in the sense of being special witnesses for the Lord Jesus Christ. Jesus is referred to as an apostle in Heb. 3:1–2, a designation meaning that he is the personal and select representative of the Father.

Bruce R. McConkie also describes each elder and member of the church as an apostle:

Every elder in the Church is or should be an apostle; that is, as a minister of the Lord and as a recipient of personal revelation from the Holy Ghost, every elder has the call to bear witness of the truth on all proper occasions. Indeed, every member should have apostolic insight and revelation, and is under obligation to raise the warning voice. (D&C 88:81; Mosiah 18:9)

McConkie also explained the meaning of the word "in the ordained sense":

an apostle is one who is ordained to the office of the Melchizedek Priesthood. Ordinarily those so ordained are also set apart as members of the Council of the Twelve and are given all of the keys of the kingdom of God on earth. This apostleship carries the responsibility of proclaiming the gospel in all the world and also of administering the affairs of the Church. Christ "chose twelve, whom also he named apostles" (Luke 6:13), and upon their shoulders the burden of the kingdom rested after he ascended to his Father (1 Cor. 12:28.) The original Twelve in latter-days were selected by revelation by the Three Witnesses to the Book of Mormon (D&C 18:26–47.)

== See also ==
- Council of Twelve Apostles (Community of Christ)
- List of members of the Quorum of the Twelve Apostles (LDS Church)
- Three Witnesses
