= Wirthlin =

Wirthlin is a Swiss surname. Notable people with the surname include:

- Joseph B. Wirthlin (1917–2008), American businessman and member of the Quorum of the Twelve Apostles of The LDS Church
- Joseph L. Wirthlin (1893–1963), the eighth presiding bishop of The LDS Church
- LeRoy S. Wirthlin (born 1935), professor at Harvard Medical School and later a practicing surgeon
- Richard Wirthlin (1931–2011), prominent American pollster, Ronald Reagan's chief strategist

== See also ==
- Wirthlin Worldwide, political and business consulting firm founded by Richard Wirthlin in 1969
