= George Gibbs =

George Gibbs may refer to:

== Politics ==
- George Gibbs (Australian politician) (1908–1968), member of the Victorian Parliament
- George Gibbs, 1st Baron Wraxall (1873–1931), British member of parliament and peer
- George Gibbs, 2nd Baron Wraxall (1928–2001), British peer and kidnapping victim

== Science ==
- George Gibbs (ethnologist) (1815–1873), American ethnologist, naturalist and geologist
- George Gibbs (mineralogist) (1776–1833), American mineralogist
- George James Gibbs (1866–1947), British astronomer and engineer
- George Gibbs (gunmaker) (died 1884), English gunmaker and founder of George Gibbs Ltd., the maker of the .505 Gibbs cartridge

== Sports ==
- George Gibbs (Australian footballer) (1905–1987), for Fitzroy and Collingwood
- George Gibbs (footballer, born 1953), English
- George Gibbs (rugby union)

== Other ==
- George Gibbs, one of the main characters in the 1938 Thornton Wilder play Our Town
- George F. Gibbs (1846–1924), secretary to the First Presidency of The Church of Jesus Christ of Latter-day Saints
- George Fort Gibbs (1870–1942), American writer and illustrator for The Saturday Evening Post
- George Sabin Gibbs (1875–1947), American general
- George Couper Gibbs (1879–1946), Florida Attorney General and circuit court judge
- George W. Gibbs Jr. (1916–2000), sailor in the United States Navy
- George Gibbs (priest), Archdeacon of Saint Kitts
- George Gibbs (special effects artist) (1937–2020), film special effects artist

== See also ==
- George Gibb (transport administrator) (1850–1925), transport administrator
- George Gibb (footballer) (1891–1917), Scottish footballer
- George Gibbs Dibrell (1822–1888), member of the United States House of Representatives
