= Joseph Wirthlin =

Joseph Wirthlin may refer to:

- Joseph B. Wirthlin (1917–2008), American apostle in The Church of Jesus Christ of Latter-day Saints
- Joseph L. Wirthlin (1893–1963), American presiding bishop in The Church of Jesus Christ of Latter-day Saints
