= Heidi S. Swinton =

American author, screenwriter and historian

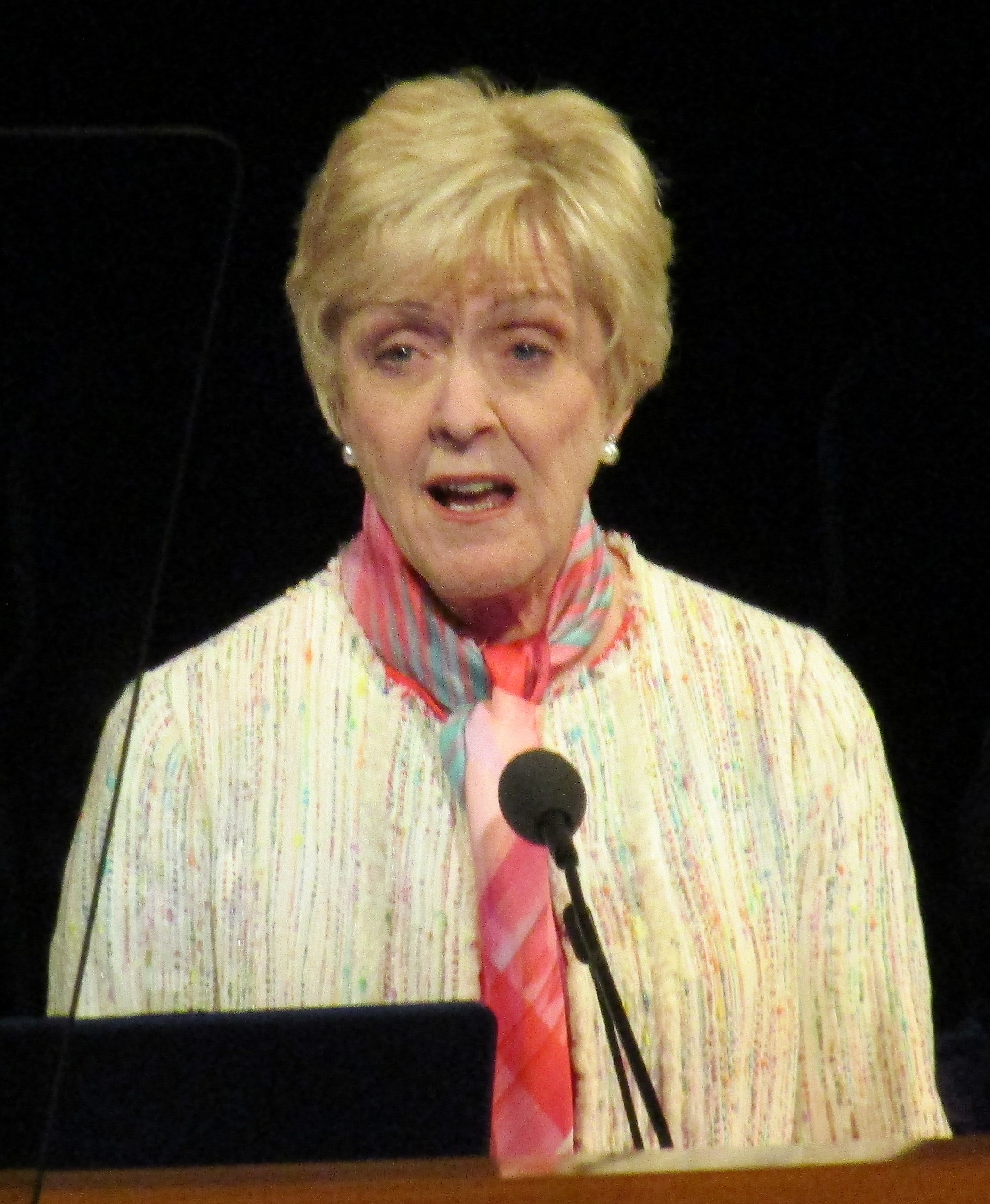
Heidi S. Swinton in 2018

Heidi Sorensen Swinton (born 1948) is an author, screenwriter and historian who has written several books to accompany historical documentaries created by film-maker Lee Groberg. She also wrote a biography of Thomas S. Monson and a biographical essay on Lorenzo Snow.

== Early life ==
Swinton was born in Salt Lake City, Utah, to Frederick Christian Sorensen and his wife Harriet Horne. She is a stepdaughter of Leonard J. Arrington. and descendant of George A. Smith. She and her husband, Jeffrey C. Swinton, also a descendant of George A. Smith, spent their honeymoon in England looking for the place of origin of the earliest Smith ancestors. Heidi and Jeffrey Swinton are the parents of five sons.

== Career ==
Swinton attended the University of Utah and the Medill School of Journalism at Northwestern University. She is a member of the Church of Jesus Christ of Latter-day Saints (LDS Church). In the LDS Church, she served as a member of the Relief Society General Board as well as at different times as both a Primary and Young Women president at the ward level. Her husband Jeffrey has served as an area seventy, stake president, and bishop in the LDS Church. He spent his career as a lawyer, working for the Salt Lake City lawfirm of Stoker and Swinton until 2006 when he was called be president of the England London South Mission.

Among works that Swinton has contributed writing to are Trail of Hope; American Prophet; Sacred Stone which was the story of the Nauvoo Temple;, Sweetwater Rescue; and America's Choir, about the Mormon Tabernacle Choir. She also written biographies of D. Arthur Haycock and Joseph Anderson. Her biographical essay on Lorenzo Snow was included in the book Presidents of the Church, edited by Leonard J. Arrington and published by Deseret Book in 1986. She has also co-authored articles on buildings such as the Hotel Utah and the Relief Society Building.

From 2006 to 2009, Swinton served as a missionary in England along with her husband Jeffrey Swinton, who was president of the England London South Mission. While in England, Swinton contributed a column to Meridian Magazine entitled "Mission Mum".

In September 2010, a biography of Thomas S. Monson written by Swinton was released.
