= George Gibb =

George Gibb may refer to:

- George Gibb (transport administrator) (1850–1925), Scottish transport administrator
- George Gibb (footballer) (1891–1917), Scottish footballer
- George Duncan Gibb (1821–1876), Canadian physician and author; see Laryngology

== Also see ==
- George Gibbs (disambiguation)
