= David A. Smith (Mormon) =

American Mormon leader (1879–1952)

First Counselor in the Presiding Bishopric
- July 18, 1918 – April 6, 1938
- Called by: Charles W. Nibley
- End reason: Honorable release of Sylvester Q. Cannon and his counselors

Second Counselor in the Presiding Bishopric
- December 4, 1907 – July 18, 1918
- Called by: Charles W. Nibley
- End reason: Called as First Counselor in Presiding Bishopric

Personal details
- Born: David Asael Smith; May 24, 1879; Salt Lake City, Utah Territory
- Died: April 6, 1952 (aged 72); Salt Lake City, Utah, U.S.
- Resting place: Salt Lake City Cemetery; 40.777°N 111.858°W
- Spouse(s): Emily Jenkins
- Children: 10
- Parents: Joseph F. Smith; Julina Lambson

David Asael Smith (May 24, 1879 – April 6, 1952) was a member of the presiding bishopric of the Church of Jesus Christ of Latter-day Saints (LDS Church) between 1907 and 1938 and was the first president of the Mormon Tabernacle Choir.

Smith was born in Salt Lake City, Utah Territory, the son of LDS apostle Joseph F. Smith and Julina Lambson. He was baptized on his eighth birthday.

When Charles W. Nibley was selected as the new Presiding Bishop of the church in 1907, he selected Smith as his second counselor. Smith was ordained a high priest and a bishop by Anthon H. Lund in December 1907. When first counselor Orrin Porter Miller died in 1918, Nibley made Smith his new first counselor. When Nibley was asked to join the First Presidency of the church in 1925, the new presiding bishop, Sylvester Q. Cannon, asked Smith to remain in the Presiding Bishopric as first counselor. Smith served in this capacity until April 6, 1938, when Cannon was released and became a member of the Quorum of the Twelve Apostles. As a member of the Presiding Bishopric, Smith was the head of LDS Hospital in Salt Lake City.

In 1908, Smith was made the first official president of the Mormon Tabernacle Choir. In this capacity, Smith's duties included managing the administrative, financial, and logistic details of the choir's increasing concert and tour schedule. Smith was president of the choir until his release from the presiding bishopric in 1938.

Smith was a member of the general board of the Deseret Sunday School Union. Smith died in Salt Lake City of cerebral arteriosclerosis and was buried at Salt Lake City Cemetery.

== See also ==
- John Wells (Mormon)

== Notes ==
The Church of Jesus Christ of Latter-day Saints titles
Preceded by Orrin P. Miller	First Counselor in the Presiding Bishopric; July 18, 1918 – April 6, 1938	Succeeded by Marvin O. Ashton
Preceded by Orrin P. Miller	Second Counselor in the Presiding Bishopric; December 4, 1907 – July 18, 1918	Succeeded by John Wells
