= Sylvester Q. Cannon =

American religious leader

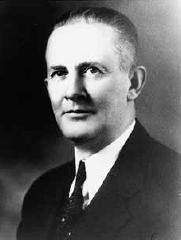

Quorum of the Twelve Apostles
- October 6, 1939 – May 29, 1943

LDS Church Apostle
- April 6, 1938 – May 29, 1943
- Reason: Heber J. Grant's discretion
- Reorganization at end of term: Spencer W. Kimball and Ezra Taft Benson were ordained after the deaths of Cannon and Rudger Clawson

Associate to the Quorum of the Twelve Apostles
- April 14, 1938 – October 6, 1939
- End reason: Called to the Quorum of the Twelve Apostles

Presiding Bishop
- June 4, 1925 – April 6, 1938
- Predecessor: Charles W. Nibley
- Successor: LeGrand Richards
- Reason: Charles W. Nibley added to the First Presidency
- End reason: Called as an Associate to the Quorum of the Twelve Apostles

Personal details
- Born: Sylvester Quayle Cannon; June 10, 1877; Salt Lake City, Utah Territory
- Died: May 29, 1943 (aged 65); Salt Lake City, Utah, U.S.
- Resting place: Salt Lake City Cemetery; 40°46′37.92″N 111°51′28.8″W
- Spouse(s): Winnifred Irene Saville
- Children: 7

Sylvester Quayle Cannon (June 10, 1877 – May 29, 1943) was an American businessman, engineer, and religious leader who served as the sixth presiding bishop of the Church of Jesus Christ of Latter-day Saints (LDS Church) from 1925 to 1938 and a member of church's Quorum of the Twelve Apostles from 1939 until his death. He was the son of George Q. Cannon, an apostle and member of the church's First Presidency.

== Biography ==
Cannon was born in Salt Lake City, Utah Territory. He studied at the University of Utah and then at the Massachusetts Institute of Technology, where he received a B.S. degree in mining engineering.

In 1899, Cannon began an LDS Church mission in Belgium. Cannon then served from 1900 to 1902 as president of the church's Netherlands–Belgium Mission. Cannon also served as Francis M. Lyman's secretary on a three-month trip to many nations along the Mediterranean and in the Middle East.

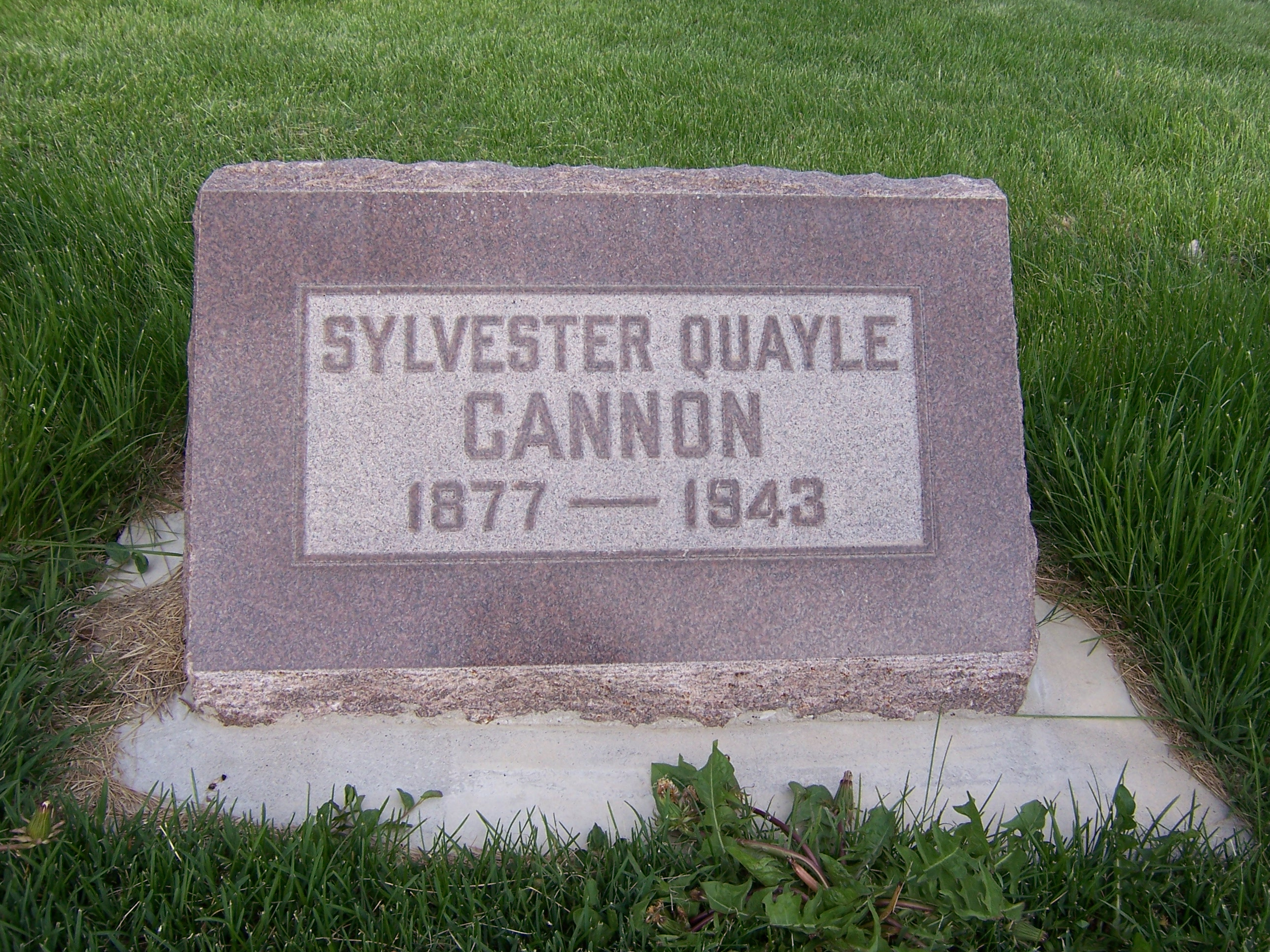
Grave marker

From 1916 to 1925, Cannon served as president of the Pioneer Stake in Salt Lake City.

In 1925, Cannon became the Presiding Bishop of the LDS Church, succeeding Charles W. Nibley. Cannon's counselors were David A. Smith and John Wells.

In 1938, Cannon was released as Presiding Bishop and was succeeded by LeGrand Richards. At the same time, Cannon was ordained an apostle and made an "associate" of the Quorum of the Twelve Apostles, a unique position that had never been filled before. When Quorum member Melvin J. Ballard died the next year, Cannon became a full member of the Quorum; he served in this position until his death.

Cannon died in Salt Lake City from encephalomalacia, or softening of the brain. He was buried at Salt Lake City Cemetery.

== See also ==
- Council on the Disposition of the Tithes

== Notes ==
The Church of Jesus Christ of Latter-day Saints titles
Preceded by Albert E. Bowen	Quorum of the Twelve Apostles; October 6, 1939 – May 29, 1943	Succeeded by Harold B. Lee
Preceded by Charles W. Nibley	Presiding Bishop; June 4, 1925 – April 6, 1938	Succeeded by LeGrand Richards
