= Thorpe B. Isaacson =

American religious leader

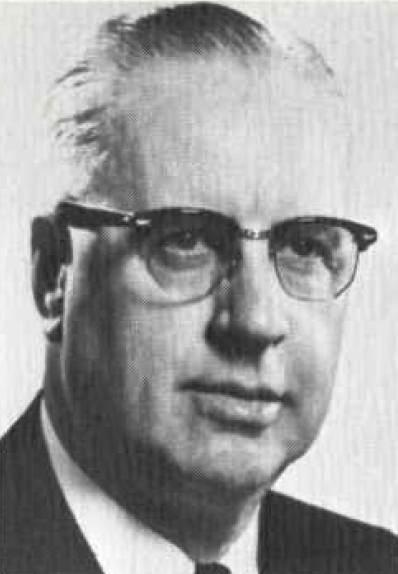

Assistant to the Quorum of the Twelve Apostles
- January 23, 1970 – November 9, 1970

Counselor in the First Presidency
- October 28, 1965 – January 18, 1970
- End reason: Dissolution of First Presidency on the death of David O. McKay

Assistant to the Quorum of the Twelve Apostles
- September 30, 1961 – October 28, 1965
- End reason: Called as Counselor in the First Presidency

First Counselor in the Presiding Bishopric
- April 6, 1952 – September 30, 1961
- End reason: Honorable release of Joseph L. Wirthlin and his counselors

Second Counselor in the Presiding Bishopric
- December 12, 1946 – April 6, 1952
- End reason: Honorable release of LeGrand Richards and his counselors

Personal details
- Born: Henry Thorpe Beal Isaacson; September 6, 1898; Ephraim, Utah, U.S.
- Died: November 9, 1970 (aged 72); Salt Lake City, Utah, U.S.
- Resting place: Salt Lake City Cemetery; 40°46′37.92″N 111°51′28.8″W

Henry Thorpe Beal Isaacson (September 6, 1898 – November 9, 1970) was a leader in the Church of Jesus Christ of Latter-day Saints (LDS Church), serving as a counselor in the First Presidency to church president David O. McKay from 1965 to 1970.

== Early life and education ==
Isaacson was born in Ephraim, Sanpete County, Utah, to Martin Isaacson and Mary Jemima Beal. Isaacson received his education at Snow Academy (now Snow College), Brigham Young University, Utah State University and the University of California–Berkeley.

== Career ==
On June 20, 1920, Isaacson married Lula Maughan Jones in the Salt Lake Temple. They eventually became the parents of two children. Isaacson worked as a school teacher and athletic coach in Idaho and later was a school district superintendent. He also was involved in insurance sales and real estate. Isaacson was a member of the Utah State University Board of Trustees.

In the LDS Church, Isaacson was ordained a high priest in 1941 by Charles A. Callis of the Quorum of the Twelve Apostles. In 1946, he became a second counselor to LeGrand Richards in the presiding bishopric, and then as first counselor to Joseph L. Wirthlin in 1952. In 1961, he was sustained as an assistant to the Quorum of the Twelve Apostles.

On October 28, 1965, Isaacson was sustained as a counselor to church president David O. McKay in the First Presidency. Isaacson being called to be a counselor in the First Presidency was unusual since he was not an apostle. However, President McKay had a great deal of confidence in Isaacson's judgement and past service. There is evidence that Isaacson was already unofficially functioning as a counselor to McKay at the time of his call to the First Presidency.

== Later life and death ==
Isaacson suffered a stroke on February 7, 1966, which severely limited his activities as a counselor. Alvin R. Dyer was added as a counselor to the First Presidency to fill the role Isaacson was to perform. Isaacson was released from the First Presidency upon McKay's death on January 18, 1970, and resumed his former position as an assistant to the Twelve.

Isaacson died in Salt Lake City, Utah, and was buried at the Salt Lake City Cemetery.

== See also ==
- Carl W. Buehner

The Church of Jesus Christ of Latter-day Saints titles
Assistant to the Quorum of the Twelve Apostles; January 23, 1970 – November 9, 1970; September 30, 1961 – October 28, 1965
Vacant Title last held by Hugh B. Brown as Third Counselor in the First Presidency	Counselor in the First Presidency; October 28, 1965 – January 18, 1970; Served alongside: Joseph Fielding Smith (October 29, 1965 - January 18, 1970); Alvin R. Dyer (April 6, 1968 – January 18, 1970)	Vacant Title next held by Gordon B. Hinckley
Preceded by Joseph L. Wirthlin	First Counselor in the Presiding Bishopric; April 6, 1952 – September 30, 1961	Succeeded by Robert L. Simpson
Preceded by Joseph L. Wirthlin	Second Counselor in the Presiding Bishopric; December 12, 1946 – April 6, 1952	Succeeded by Carl W. Buehner
