= John Wells (Mormon) =

American Mormon bishop (1864–1941)

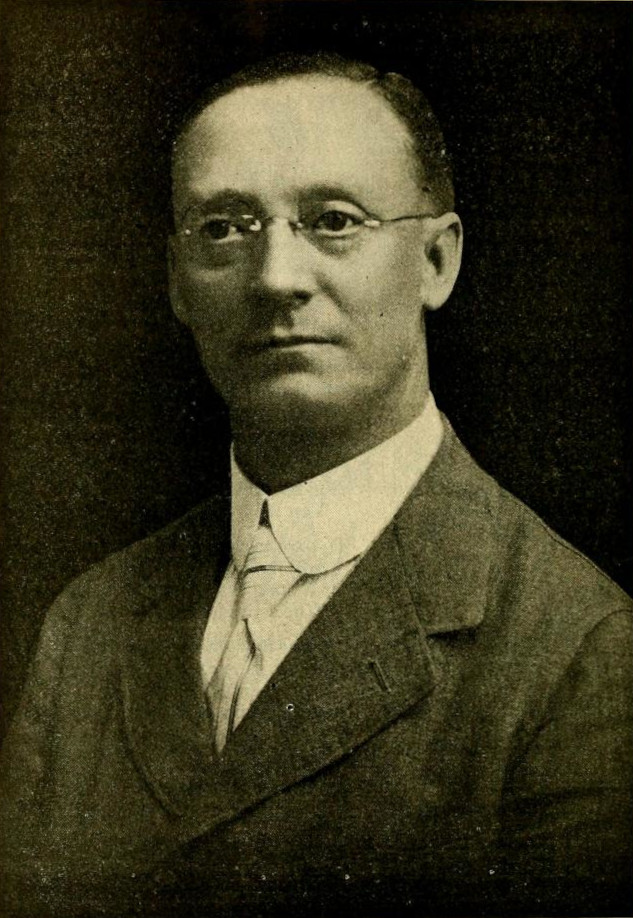

Second Counselor in the Presiding Bishopric
- 18 July 1918 – 6 April 1938
- Called by: Charles W. Nibley
- End reason: Honorable release of Sylvester Q. Cannon and his counselors

Personal details
- Born: John Wells; 16 September 1864; Carlton, Nottinghamshire, England, United Kingdom
- Died: 18 April 1941 (aged 76); Salt Lake City, Utah, United States

John Wells (16 September 1864 – 18 April 1941) was a British member of the presiding bishopric of the Church of Jesus Christ of Latter-day Saints (LDS Church) from 1918 to 1938.

Wells was born in Carlton, Nottinghamshire, England. In 1882, he became a member of the LDS Church.

Wells and his wife Almena Thorpe emigrated to Utah Territory in 1889. He gained employment as a clerk in the office of the LDS Church's presiding bishop.

In 1918, Presiding Bishop Charles W. Nibley asked Wells to become his second counselor. When Nibley was replaced by Sylvester Q. Cannon, Wells stayed on as the second counselor in the Presiding Bishopric of the church. Wells served as a general authority until the end of Cannon's tenure in 1938.

Wells died in Salt Lake City, Utah of pyelonephritis, or pus buildup in the kidneys. He was buried at Salt Lake City Cemetery.

== See also ==
- David A. Smith (Mormon)
- Council on the Disposition of the Tithes

== Notes ==
The Church of Jesus Christ of Latter-day Saints titles
Preceded by David A. Smith	Second Counselor in the Presiding Bishopric; 18 July 1918 – 6 April 1938	Succeeded by Joseph L. Wirthlin
