= Marvin O. Ashton =

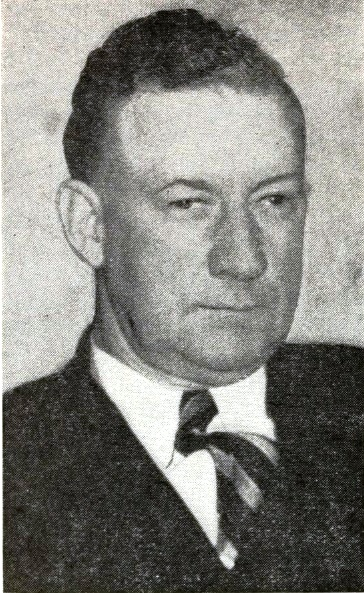

First Counselor in the Presiding Bishopric
- April 6, 1938 – October 7, 1946
- Called by: LeGrand Richards

Personal details
- Born: Marvin Owen Ashton; April 8, 1883; Salt Lake City, Utah Territory
- Died: October 7, 1946 (aged 63); Salt Lake City, Utah, U.S.
- Resting place: Larkin Sunset Lawn Cemetery; 40.74110°N 111.82280°W
- Spouse(s): Rachel G. Jeremy
- Children: 7, including Marvin J. Ashton
- Parents: Edward T. Ashton; Effie W. Morris

Marvin Owen Ashton (April 8, 1883 – October 7, 1946) was a general authority of the Church of Jesus Christ of Latter-day Saints (LDS Church) from 1938 until his death. Prior to becoming a general authority, Ashton was a prominent local leader of the LDS Church in Salt Lake City, Utah.

Ashton was born in Salt Lake City, Utah Territory to Mormon parents. He married Rachel Grace Jeremy in 1906 and in 1907 went to England as a missionary for the LDS Church. He returned to Utah in 1909, residing in Salt Lake City. From 1917 to 1924 Ashton was bishop of the church's Wasatch Ward. In 1935, he became president of the church's Highland Stake.

In 1938, Ashton was called as first counselor to LeGrand Richards in the church's presiding bishopric. Ashton and Richards were brothers-in-law, with Ashton's half-sister, Ina Jane, being married to Richards. Ashton served in the presiding bishopric and as a general authority until his death from coronary occlusion in Salt Lake City. Ashton was chairman of the church's General Church Music Committee during his time as a general authority, and he was a frequent contributor to the Improvement Era.

Ashton is the father of Marvin J. Ashton, who became a general authority of the church in 1969 and a member of the church's Quorum of the Twelve Apostles in 1971.

== Notes ==
The Church of Jesus Christ of Latter-day Saints titles
Preceded by David A. Smith	First Counselor in the Presiding Bishopric; April 6, 1938 – October 7, 1946	Succeeded by Joseph L. Wirthlin
