= D. Arthur Haycock =

David Arthur Haycock (September 4, 1916 – February 25, 1994) was a personal secretary to several twentieth-century presidents of the Church of Jesus Christ of Latter-day Saints (LDS Church), including George Albert Smith, Joseph Fielding Smith, Harold B. Lee, Spencer W. Kimball and Ezra Taft Benson.

As secretary, Haycock handled most of the correspondence and scheduled meetings for the church's president. Haycock also accompanied these leaders on their many trips throughout the world where he aided in the planning and note taking of meetings.

== Biography ==
Haycock was born the oldest of four children to David Haycock and Lily Edith Crane in Farmington, Utah. He lived in various locations in Idaho and Utah growing up. He served as a missionary, for the church in Hawaii. Following his return from missionary service, he married Maureen McCellen, took a job at the Deseret News, and was later appointed as George Albert Smith's personal secretary.

When McKay became the church's president, he retained his personal secretary, Clare Middlemiss, and Haycock was appointed as an assistant secretary to Joseph Anderson. He later served as an assistant to Benson as U.S. Secretary of Agriculture, as well as a mission president in Hawaii from 1954 to 1958.

Upon his return from Hawaii, Haycock again took employment with the Deseret News. Upon McKay's death, he became personal secretary to Joseph Fielding Smith and aided in his travels. Upon Smith's death, Haycock assisted Lee in his travels. Haycock took Lee to LDS Hospital when he collapsed from exhaustion and he was there when Lee's death was imminent. Haycock notified the other members of the church's First Presidency and Kimball, who as President of the Twelve would become church president upon Lee's death.

When Kimball's health made it impossible for him to travel frequently or leave his apartment, Haycock accompanied Kimball's counselor, Gordon B. Hinckley, when Hinckley would visit Kimball in his apartment. Haycock also read several of Kimball's talks when he was unable to address general conference sessions himself. Haycock was a speaker at Kimball's funeral.

Upon Kimball's death, Haycock served briefly as personal secretary to Benson before Haycock's appointment as president of the Laie Hawaii Temple. He retired prior to his return to Hawaii in 1986. He died at the age of 77 following complications from heart surgery in February 1994.
