= World Church Leadership Council =

Leadership body of Community of Christ

The World Church Leadership Council is a leadership body of Community of Christ. It encompasses the First Presidency, the Council of Twelve Apostles, and the Presiding Bishopric. The group convenes at the church headquarters in the Independence Temple. With the adoption of a new set of church bylaws at the 2002 World Conference, this body replaced the predecessor council known as the Joint Council. Bylaw provisions allow for additional members to be added to the World Church Leadership Council.

== Overview ==
Since its formation, the World Church Leadership Council has been the deliberative and consensus forming body for a number of important decisions, such as the 2002 "Statement on Homosexuality", formation of mission centers, and setting of dates for specially called World Conferences. The World Church Leadership Council assisted with the recommendation to the World Conference by the Council of Twelve that Stephen M. Veazey be ordained as Prophet-President of the church. In 2006, the World Church Leadership Council deliberated significant restructuring of the church's headquarters operations and reduction in the number of paid field ministers. It has contributed to development of a new format for the 2007 Community of Christ World Conference.

== Prior history of the Joint Council ==
Before the adoption of the 2002 bylaws, the predecessor body known as the Joint Council served essentially the same role as the new World Church Leadership Council. During their deliberation of the vision and mission statements of the church at a 1994 Joint Council retreat, President Wallace B. Smith first suggested a new name for the church, Community of Christ. The Joint Council was often designated as the policy approval body in legislation passed at World Conferences over a period of many decades.

== See also ==
- Council on the Disposition of the Tithes
