= Rebecca Winters (pioneer) =

Coordinates: 41°50′35.7″N 103°37′1.3″W

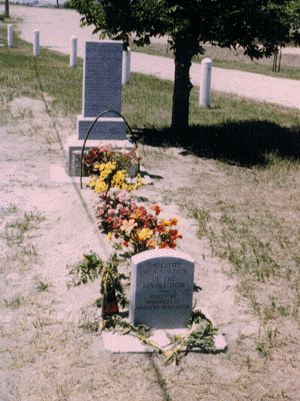
- Grave of Rebecca Winters
- Born: Rebecca Burdick; January 16, 1799; Canajoharie, New York, U.S.
- Died: August 15, 1852 (aged 53) near Scottsbluff, Nebraska, U.S.
- Spouse: Hiram Winters
- Children: Oscar Winters; Alonzo Winters; Hiram Adelbert Winters; Rebecca Winters; Helen Melissa Winters
- Parent(s): Gideon Burdick; Catharina Schmidt

Rebecca Burdick Winters (January 16, 1799 – August 15, 1852) was a Mormon pioneer who with her family left the eastern United States to emigrate to the Salt Lake Valley with other Latter-day Saints. In August 1852, en route to present-day Utah, she died of cholera near present-day Scottsbluff, Nebraska. Her grave, located in the Rebecca Winters Memorial Park, has become a popular landmark along the Mormon Trail and is a Nebraska State Landmark.

Although the grave remains a popular tourist attraction and is one of the few identified graves along the Westward Expansion Trails, some descendants—citing a lack of maintenance and safety at the current site—have requested her grave be removed from the trail side and relocated to a museum in a neighboring city. In response, descendant Jacob Oscarson created a survey of family members asking for feedback. As of summer 2022, the grave was to stay at its current site, with the Scotts Bluff County Board of Commissioners granting permission to volunteers to make some minor improvements.

== Biography ==
=== Origins ===
Rebecca Burdick was born to Gideon Burdick and Catharina Schmidt in Canajoharie, New York. In 1806, Catharina died; Rebecca was only seven years old at this time. Rebecca's father, Gideon, then married Jane Ripley Brown, and when Rebecca was 18 the family relocated to Athens County, Ohio. Here she met Hiram Winters and they were married in 1824. Eventually the two were introduced to Mormonism and joined the Latter Day Saint church. They moved their family to Kirtland, Ohio, to gather with other church members. Burdick's brother, Thomas Burdick, was also converted to the church.

When living in Kirtland, Rebecca and Hiram were caretakers of the Kirtland Temple.

=== The Trek West ===
After leaving Kirtland, the Winters family briefly stayed in Nauvoo, Illinois, before leaving on the Mormon Trail with the James C. Snow Wagon Company in June 1852. On August 13 of that year, while near Chimney Rock, Rebecca became sick with cholera, and the illness continued to get worse until she died on August 15. Following her death, William Fletcher Reynolds (1826 – 1904), a family friend, carved her name and age into an iron wagon tire and buried it to mark the grave's location.

=== Grave site and relocation ===
After the completion of the Union Pacific Railroad, Mormon pioneers stopped traveling by foot and Winters's grave was all but forgotten. Farmers in the Scottsbluff area knew about the grave, but it was not until the beginning of 20th century that the grave became a tourist attraction. It was during this time that the Nebraska, Wyoming and Western Railroad (later part of the Chicago, Burlington and Quincy Railroad) was running a railroad line through the Platte Valley, and after discovering the marked grave, they rerouted the tracks from their original plan to avoid disturbing it. For almost 100 years, thousands visited the grave site, so in 1995 the Burlington Northern Railroad decided to relocate the grave for the safety of visitors (due to its proximity to the railroad tracks). In September 1995, her body was exhumed and relocated a little further east and north of the original location. In June 1996, hundreds of Winters's descendants gathered for the dedication of the Rebecca Winters Memorial Park. The grave remains one of the few marked graves among the approximately 6,000 Mormons who perished crossing the plains.
