= Richard Wirthlin =

American pollster

Richard B. Wirthlin

Second Quorum of the Seventy
- 01:00, April 6, 1996 – October 6, 2001
- Called by: Gordon B. Hinckley
- End reason: Honorably released

Personal details
- Born: Richard Bitner Wirthlin; March 15, 1931; Salt Lake City, Utah
- Died: March 16, 2011 (aged 80); Salt Lake City, Utah

Richard Bitner Wirthlin (March 15, 1931 – March 16, 2011) was a prominent American pollster, who is best known as Ronald Reagan's chief strategist, serving as his political consultant and pollster for twenty years, from 1968 through the end of his presidency. He became a senior adviser and member of Reagan's inner circle and is known to have helped him shape his political message and strategies, both in presidential campaigns and in the White House. Wirthlin also was a general authority of the Church of Jesus Christ of Latter-day Saints (LDS Church) and a member of its Second Quorum of the Seventy from 1996 to 2001.

== Early life ==
Wirthin was born in Salt Lake City, Utah, the son of Madeline Bitner and Joseph L. Wirthlin, who later served as presiding bishop of the LDS Church. As a young adult, he spent two years as a Mormon missionary, serving in Switzerland and Austria from 1951 to 1953. Wirthlin was assigned to Basel, Switzerland for his entire mission. After finishing his missionary service, Wirthlin obtained a B.A. in economics and an M.A. in economics and statistics from the University of Utah. From 1954 to 1955 he served in the United States army. He received a Ph.D. in economics from the University of California at Berkeley.

== Career in polling firm and politics ==
In 1969, Wirthlin founded a survey research firm based in Los Angeles. Over the years the firm had various names, including Decision Making Information, Inc., The Wirthlin Group, and finally, Wirthlin Worldwide. The firm was acquired in 2004 by Harris Interactive. After the merger with Harris Interactive, Wirthlin served on its board of directors.

In 1980, when California governor Ronald Reagan decided to run for president, he turned to Wirthlin for political advice. Wirthlin, together with his consulting firm, played a pivotal role in both the 1980 and 1984 elections of Reagan. According to the book The Neglected Voter, Wirthlin was the author of Reagan's historic 1980 campaign plan and foresaw the rise of so-called "Reagan Democrats". After Reagan won the 1980 presidential election, Wirthlin moved to Washington, D.C. and continued to assist the president and the Republican National Committee. His work on the first Reagan campaign earned him the title, Adman of the Year, declared by Advertising Age.

In addition to consulting work, he was the author of two books and at least one podcast:

- The Greatest Communicator: What Ronald Reagan Taught Me about Politics, Leadership, and Life, co-authored with Wynton Hall, Published in 2004, the book describes his years working with former president Ronald Reagan
- Estrategia Electoral: Persuadir Por La Razon, Motivar Por La Emocion, La Estrategia De La Comunicacion Politica, published in 1995
- Podcast on Entrprenuerism, February 12, 2007

== LDS Church service ==
Among many other ecclesiastical assignments over the years, Wirthlin served for a time as a bishop in the LDS Church.

In 1995, Wirthlin returned to his native Utah. In 1996, Wirthlin was asked by LDS Church president Gordon B. Hinckley to serve as a church general authority. Wirthlin served as a member of the church's Second Quorum of the Seventy until October 2001, when he was honorably released from his duties.

== Family ==
On 23 November 1956, Wirthlin married Jeralie Mae Chandler in the LDS Church's Salt Lake Temple. They became the parents of eight children.

Wirthlin has several relatives who have held prominent leadership positions of the LDS Church. His father was the presiding bishop from 1952 to 1961. His older brother, Joseph B. Wirthlin, was an apostle and a member of the Quorum of the Twelve Apostles from 1986 to 2008. Hinckley—who served as church president from 1995 to 2008—was his first cousin on his mother's side.

== Death ==
Wirthlin died of renal failure in his Salt Lake City home one day after his eightieth birthday. He was buried in the Salt Lake City Cemetery.
