= Wirthlin Worldwide =

Former US political and business company

- Company type: Private
- Industry: public opinion research
- Founded: 1969; 57 years ago
- Founder: Richard Wirthlin
- Headquarters: Reston, Virginia
- Website: wirthlin.com (archived)

Wirthlin Worldwide was an American political and business consulting firm founded by Richard Wirthlin in 1969. The company specialized in polls and their interpretation. In addition to political consulting, Wirthlin Worldwide also provided research for non-profits and industry, covering topics such as handwashing behavior after using public toilets, post-September 11 charitable giving, the impact of a company's ethical image on consumer purchasing behavior, and preferred methods for purchasing prescription drugs.

It ceased to operate as a separate company on September 8, 2004, when it was sold to Harris Interactive in a deal valued at $42 million.

== History ==
Originally established as Decision Making Information, Inc, Wirthlin Worldwide was founded in Los Angeles in 1969 by Dr. Richard Bitner Wirthlin. Wirthlin was an economist with a PhD in economics from the University of California, Berkeley. In 1980, Wirthlin Worldwide was asked to help with the presidential campaign of the then-Governor of California, Ronald Reagan. This led to continued engagements throughout the two terms of President Reagan, including the second presidential campaign.

During its existence, the company went through two name changes, The Wirthlin Group in the 1990s and Wirthlin Worldwide at the beginning of the 21st century. It was finally sold and merged into Harris Interactive in the fall of 2004. The company website was shut down and began redirecting to Harris Interactive on March 16, 2005.

It ceased to operate as a separate company on September 8, 2004, when it was sold to Harris Interactive in a deal valued at $42 million.
