= Joseph B. Wirthlin =

Apostle of the Church of Jesus Christ of Latter-day Saints

Quorum of the Twelve Apostles
- October 4, 1986 – December 1, 2008

LDS Church Apostle
- October 9, 1986 – December 1, 2008
- Called by: Ezra Taft Benson
- Reason: Death of Spencer W. Kimball and reorganization of First Presidency
- Reorganization at end of term: Neil L. Andersen ordained

Presidency of the First Quorum of the Seventy
- August 28, 1986 – October 4, 1986
- End reason: Called to the Quorum of the Twelve Apostles

First Quorum of the Seventy
- October 1, 1976 – October 4, 1986
- End reason: Called to the Quorum of the Twelve Apostles

Assistant to the Quorum of the Twelve Apostles
- April 4, 1975 – October 1, 1976
- End reason: Position abolished

Personal details
- Born: Joseph Bitner Wirthlin; June 11, 1917; Salt Lake City, Utah, U.S.
- Died: December 1, 2008 (aged 91); Salt Lake City, Utah, U.S.
- Resting place: Salt Lake City Cemetery; 40.777°N 111.858°W
- Signature
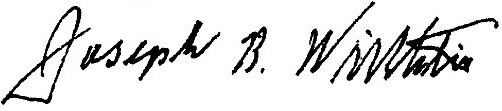

Joseph Bitner Wirthlin (June 11, 1917 – December 1, 2008) was an American businessman, religious leader and member of the Quorum of the Twelve Apostles of the Church of Jesus Christ of Latter-day Saints (LDS Church). He was sustained to the Twelve on October 4, 1986, and ordained an apostle on October 9, 1986, by Thomas S. Monson. He became an apostle following the death of church president Spencer W. Kimball. As a member of the Quorum of the Twelve, Wirthlin was accepted by the church membership as a prophet, seer, and revelator.

== Biography ==
Born in Salt Lake City, Utah, Wirthlin was the son of Madeline Bitner and Joseph L. Wirthlin, who was also a general authority of the LDS Church, serving as Presiding Bishop from 1952 to 1961. Wirthlin was a half-first cousin of Gordon B. Hinckley, who became president of the LDS Church; the two cousins attended the same congregation as children.

As a young man, Wirthlin earned the rank of Eagle Scout in the Boy Scouts of America. As a standout high school quarterback, Wirthlin was offered a football scholarship at the University of Utah, but deferred it and served as a missionary in Germany, Austria, and Switzerland from 1936 to 1939, returning to Utah just before the outbreak of World War II. Wirthlin played football as a running back for the University of Utah following his mission. Wirthlin's career was spent as a prominent business leader in Salt Lake City. He was also president of a trade association in Utah.

Wirthlin served in the LDS Church as bishop of the Bonneville Ward in Salt Lake City from 1955 to 1964. The day he was released as bishop he was called to serve in the stake high council and was set apart by Joseph Fielding Smith. On December 6, 1964, Wirthlin was set apart by LeGrand Richards as second counselor to Russell M. Nelson in the presidency of the Salt Lake Bonneville Stake; Wirthlin served in that capacity until Nelson's release in 1971. Wirthlin became a general authority of the church in 1975, when he was called to serve as an Assistant to the Twelve. He was the last individual called to this position before it was discontinued in 1976. In 1984, when the LDS Church first organized areas with area presidencies, Wirthlin was the first president of the Europe Area. The area was headquartered in Frankfurt, Germany and covered all of Europe and Africa. Wirthlin's call to the Quorum of the Twelve came shortly after his call to serve in the church's Presidency of the Seventy.

Wirthlin married Elisa Young Rogers on May 26, 1941, in the Salt Lake Temple; they had eight children. She died in August 2006 of causes incident to age.

On December 1, 2008, Wirthlin "had gone to bed at his Salt Lake City home, and died peacefully at about 11:30 pm of causes incident to age." At the time of his death, Wirthlin was the oldest apostle among the ranks of the church. He was buried at Salt Lake City Cemetery.

Shortly after his death, the University of Utah announced that the Elder Joseph B. Wirthlin Family Scholarship, an endowed scholarship benefiting the Utah football program, would be named in his honor. On January 2, 2009, when the Utes won the Sugar Bowl, all of the Utah players wore a commemorative sticker on their helmets with the initials JBW in his honor.

== Notes ==
The Church of Jesus Christ of Latter-day Saints titles
Preceded by M. Russell Ballard	Quorum of the Twelve Apostles; October 9, 1986 – December 1, 2008	Succeeded by Richard G. Scott
