= George F. Gibbs =

LDS Church figure

George Francis Gibbs (23 November 1846 – 10 March 1924) was the secretary to the First Presidency of the Church of Jesus Christ of Latter-day Saints (LDS Church).

Gibbs was born in Haverfordwest, Pembrokeshire, Wales. In 1850, his parents were taught by Mormon missionaries and the family joined the LDS Church. As a young adult, Gibbs worked for the LDS Church in the mission office in Liverpool, England, and emigrated to Utah Territory with his parents in 1866.

In the late nineteenth century, Gibbs was sent back to Liverpool as a church missionary to assist the mission in managing its finances.

Gibbs became a member of the Council of Fifty on 24 June 1882. He acted as an assistant secretary to the First Presidency under George Reynolds. When Reynolds was in prison on a bigamy conviction from 1876 to 1881, Gibbs acted as the secretary to the First Presidency. When Reynolds became a general authority in 1890, Gibbs again took upon more of the secretarial duties that Reynolds usually performed. When Reynolds died in 1909, Gibbs officially became the First Presidency's secretary. He remained in this employment until 1922, when he retired and was replaced by Joseph Anderson.

In 1876, Gibbs married Ida Snow, a daughter of church apostle Lorenzo Snow and his wife Eleanor Houtz. Gibbs practiced plural marriage and married Sarah E. Worthen in 1884.

Gibbs died of tongue cancer at Salt Lake City, Utah.
