= Joseph L. Wirthlin =

American religious leader

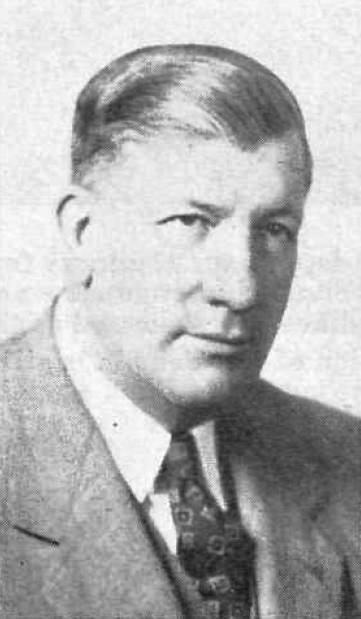

Presiding Bishop
- April 6, 1952 – September 30, 1961
- Called by: David O. McKay
- End reason: Honorably released

First Counselor in the Presiding Bishopric
- December 12, 1946 – April 6, 1952
- Called by: LeGrand Richards
- End reason: Reorganization (LeGrand Richards called to Quorum of the Twelve)

Second Counselor in the Presiding Bishopric
- April 6, 1938 – December 12, 1946
- Called by: LeGrand Richards
- End reason: Called as First Counselor in Presiding Bishopric

Personal details
- Born: Joseph Leopold Wirthlin; August 14, 1893; Salt Lake City, Utah Territory
- Died: January 25, 1963 (aged 69); Salt Lake City, Utah, U.S.

Joseph Leopold Wirthlin (August 14, 1893 – January 25, 1963) was the eighth presiding bishop of the Church of Jesus Christ of Latter-day Saints (LDS Church).

Wirthlin was born in Salt Lake City, Utah Territory. He served as a missionary in the church's Swiss–German Mission in 1913 and 1914. He served as bishop of the Salt Lake 33rd Ward in the Liberty Stake from 1928 to 1935. On October 27, 1935, the Liberty Stake was split and the Bonneville Stake was organized with Wirthlin as its first president. He was set apart by Joseph Fielding Smith.

Wirthlin became a general authority in 1938 when he was called as a counselor to LeGrand Richards in the presiding bishopric. In 1952, LDS Church president David O. McKay called Wirthlin to be the church's eighth presiding bishop. Wirthlin called Thorpe B. Isaacson and Carl W. Buehner as his counselors. Wirthlin and his counselors served until 1961.

Wirthlin died in Salt Lake City, Utah, at LDS Hospital of heart failure, and was buried at Salt Lake City Cemetery.

Wirthlin and his wife, Madeline Bitner, were the parents of five children, including Joseph B. Wirthlin, who served as a member of the church's Quorum of the Twelve Apostles. Their other children were Judith Wirthlin Parker; Gwendolyn Wirthlin McConkie; Richard B. Wirthlin, a former general authority; and David Bitner Wirthlin, a former president of the church's Nauvoo Illinois Temple.

== See also ==
- Council on the Disposition of the Tithes

The Church of Jesus Christ of Latter-day Saints titles
Preceded by LeGrand Richards	Presiding Bishop; April 6, 1952 – September 30, 1961	Succeeded by John H. Vandenburg
Preceded by Marvin O. Ashton	First Counselor in the Presiding Bishopric; December 12, 1946 – April 6, 1952	Succeeded by Thorpe B. Isaacson
Preceded by John Wells	Second Counselor in the Presiding Bishopric; April 6, 1938 – December 12, 1946	Succeeded by Thorpe B. Isaacson
