= A Marvelous Work and a Wonder =

1950 book by LeGrand Richards

- First edition
- Author: LeGrand Richards
- Language: English
- Publisher: Deseret Book
- Publication date: 1950
- Publication place: United States
- Pages: xvi, 376
- Dewey Decimal: 289.3
- LC Class: BX8635 .R45

A Marvelous Work and a Wonder is a 1950 book by LeGrand Richards on the history and doctrine of the Church of Jesus Christ of Latter-day Saints (LDS Church). The book was intended as a missionary tool and is traditionally cited as the best-selling Mormon book of all time (not including the standard works). As of 2001, it was said to have sold over three million copies.

In 1937, as president of the LDS Church's Southern States Mission, Richards wrote a document entitled "The Message of Mormonism" to assist missionaries in presenting Mormon teachings. In 1950, as presiding bishop of the church, Richards expanded his document into a full-length book, which he named after a phrase used in the King James Version of Isaiah 29:13–14; Richards identified the teachings of the LDS Church as the wonder referred to. The book was published by Deseret Book, a publisher owned by the LDS Church.

Richards donated all proceeds of the sale of the book to the missionary funds of the LDS Church. The book is considered a Mormon classic and for several years was among the few non-scriptural works that full-time LDS Church missionaries were asked to study. However, A Marvelous Work and a Wonder is no longer part of the "approved missionary library."
