= Thomas Burdick =

Thomas Burdick (November 17, 1795 (or 1797) – November 6, 1877) was a leader in the early Latter Day Saint movement, a Mormon pioneer, and a politician in Los Angeles County, California.

Burdick was born in Canajoharie, New York. He married Anna Higley in 1828. In 1834, the Burdicks heard the preaching of missionary Sidney Rigdon and joined the Church of the Latter Day Saints led by Joseph Smith. The Burdicks moved to Kirtland, Ohio, to join the main gathering of Latter Day Saints and Burdick was made an elder in the church. In 1836, he was given the responsibility of managing the membership records of the church. On November 7, 1837, Burdick became a high priest and a member of the presiding high council at Kirtland. In 1838, Burdick was one of the twelve high priests selected by Bishop Newel K. Whitney to constitute the first sitting of the Common Council of the Church, which heard charges levied by Sylvester Smith against Joseph Smith. Burdick also taught school and was a justice of the peace in Kirtland.

In 1838–39, after the majority of Latter Day Saints left Kirtland, Burdick remained. He was appointed the church bishop in Kirtland on May 22, 1841. After the death of Joseph Smith in 1844, Burdick followed the leadership of Brigham Young and made plans to follow Young west. Burdick remained in Kanesville, Iowa until 1853, when he led a Mormon pioneer company of over 100 wagons to Salt Lake City, Utah Territory.

After arriving in Salt Lake City, most of the company, including Burdick, determined to carry on to the Mormon settlement of San Bernardino, California. In the winter of 1853–54, Burdick and his family settled at San Gabriel Township, California.

In 1855, Burdick was elected as a member of the Los Angeles County Board of Supervisors; he served two consecutive one-year terms.

Burdick died in Los Angeles of apoplexy. He and his wife were the parents of seven children. Their son Cyrus Burdick was the co-founder of Pomona, California.

Burdick's sister was Rebecca Burdick Winters, a Mormon pioneer known for her grave site along the Mormon Trail.
