= Council of the Church =

In the Church of Jesus Christ of Latter-day Saints, the Council of the Church may be the chief governing body of the church which holds the power to make the final decision on any spiritual matter that will affect any member of the church. Its existence and status are uncertain, and the body has not been formally convened since the presidency of John Taylor. The Council of the Church is sometimes confused with the Common Council of the Church.

== Origin ==
The council was first spoken of in a revelation that was given to Joseph Smith on March 28, 1835:

[T]he most important business of the church, and the most difficult cases of the church, inasmuch as there is not satisfaction upon the decision of the bishop or judges, it shall be handed over and carried up unto the council of the church, before the Presidency of the High Priesthood. And the Presidency of the High Priesthood shall have power to call other high priests, even twelve, to assist as counselors; and thus the Presidency of the High Priesthood and its counselors shall have power to decide upon testimony according to the laws of the church. ... [T]his is the highest council of the church of God, and a final decision upon controversies in spiritual matters. There is not any person belonging to the church who is exempt from this council of the church.

== History ==
When the council has been convened, it has usually been composed of the First Presidency of the church and the Quorum of the Twelve Apostles. However, the council has been convened with non-general authority high priests serving as the twelve counselors at least once.

== The council in the church today ==
The Council of the Church has not been formally convened in the church for many years. For this reason, few Latter-day Saints have heard of the council or are familiar with its potential powers. However, in the church today, the First Presidency and the Quorum of the Twelve Apostles hold weekly combined meetings in the Salt Lake Temple. This meeting acts in the church as the de facto highest governing council. Thus, the joint meetings of the First Presidency and the Quorum of the Twelve Apostles may be said to be the de facto, if not the de jure, Council of the Church.

== See also ==
- Council on the Disposition of the Tithes
- Common Council of the Church
