= Charles W. Nibley =

American Mormon leader (1849–1931)

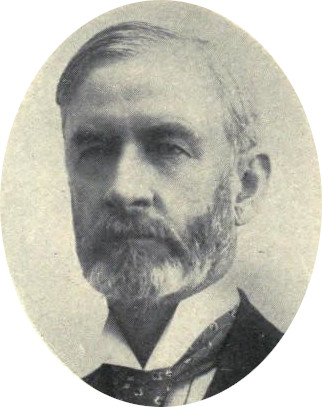
- Nibley while serving as Presiding Bishop

Second Counselor in the First Presidency
- May 28, 1925 – December 11, 1931
- Called by: Heber J. Grant
- Predecessor: Anthony W. Ivins
- Successor: J. Reuben Clark
- Reason: Death of Charles W. Penrose
- Reorganization at end of term: J. Reuben Clark added to the First Presidency

Presiding Bishop
- December 4, 1907 – May 28, 1925
- Called by: Joseph F. Smith
- Predecessor: William B. Preston
- Successor: Sylvester Q. Cannon
- End reason: Called as Second Counselor in First Presidency

Personal details
- Born: Charles Wilson Nibley; February 5, 1849; Hunterfield, Scotland, UK
- Died: December 11, 1931 (aged 82); Salt Lake City, Utah, US
- Cause of death: Pneumonia
- Resting place: Logan City Cemetery; 41.7492°N 111.8061°W
- Spouse(s): Rebecca Ann Neibaur; Ellen Ricks; Julia Budge
- Children: 24
- Parents: James Nibley; Jean Wilson

Charles Wilson Nibley (February 5, 1849 – December 11, 1931) was a Scottish-American religious leader, businessman, and politician. Nibley was a member of The Church of Jesus Christ of Latter-day Saints and served as the fifth presiding bishop of the Church of Jesus Christ of Latter-day Saints (LDS Church) between 1907 and 1925 and a member of the church's First Presidency from 1925 until his death. He was also a businessman and was involved in various industries, such as lumber, sugar, and railroads.

== Early life ==
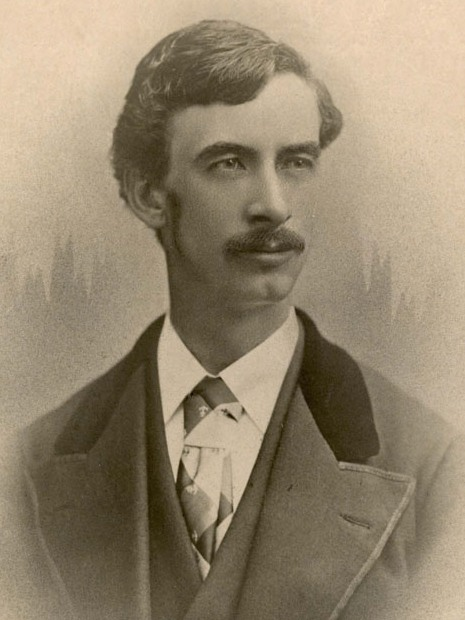
Charles W. Nibley 1873 (age 24)

Nibley was born in Hunterfield, Midlothian, Scotland to James Nibley and Jean Wilson. His family moved to the United States in 1855 to join with the main body of Latter-day Saints. They spent some time living in Rhode Island. In 1860, they moved to the Utah Territory. The family was sent north to settle in Cache Valley, and eventually settled in Wellsville. In Wellsville, Nibley worked as a sheepherder and a store clerk.

As an adult, Nibley moved to Brigham City, Utah, where he worked for Morris Rosenbaum (a Jewish convert to Mormonism) and later became a partner in the store where he worked. It was there he met Rebecca Neibaur (who was the sister of one of Rosenbaum's wives) and was married in 1869. Following the 19th century practice of plural marriage, Nibley married Ellen Ricks in 1880 and Julia Budge in 1885.

== Business ventures ==
In 1879 to 1885, Nibley managed a lumber company that was part of the LDS Church's United Order program. He then joined with David Eccles and George Stoddard to form the Oregon Lumber Company in 1889. As one of Nibley's grandsons, Hugh Nibley, related, Charles Nibley used economic tricks, including manipulating the Homestead Act to acquire large swaths of land, then would pay off government agents who investigated. Nibley was a firm believer in monopolies, believing competition was "economic waste". He also believed that LDS Church members who didn't support paying higher prices to Mormon businesses (versus lower prices to non-Mormon businesses) were betraying the church. This attitude of loyalty was also supported by Heber J. Grant in the October 1919 General Conference.

Nibley also became involved in railroads, insurance, banking, politics, and major agricultural endeavors, eventually becoming a multimillionaire. The sugar beet growing town of Nibley, Oregon was named for him. He was later instrumental in forming the Amalgamated Sugar Company and the Utah and Idaho Sugar Company (later known as U&I Sugar Co). He was chairman of the executive committee of the Utah-Idaho Sugar Company, President of the Standard Investors Inc. (comprising all of the Nibley holdings) and a valued director of the following business institutions: Zion's Cooperative Mercantile Institution, Utah State National Bank, Zion's Savings Bank & Trust Company, Utah Power & Light Company, Western Pacific Railroad Company, Hotel Utah, Utah Lime and Stone Company, Mountain States Telephone & Telegraph Company, and Beneficial Life Insurance Co.

== Church service ==
=== Missions ===
Nibley served two missions for the LDS Church. His first mission, from October 1869 to March 1870, was to the eastern United States and was primarily a goodwill mission, trying to counteract the negative press surrounding polygamy in Utah. His second mission, from May 1877 to May 1879, was to England and proved to be influential to later Church history. He traveled with the new mission president, Joseph F. Smith, and while serving in England became good friends with the future Church president.

=== Stake Presidency ===
After Nibley had moved to Oregon to participate in the lumber business, an LDS stake was organized in the area, and Nibley was called as the first counselor in the stake presidency. He served from June 1901 to December 1907.

=== Presiding Bishop ===
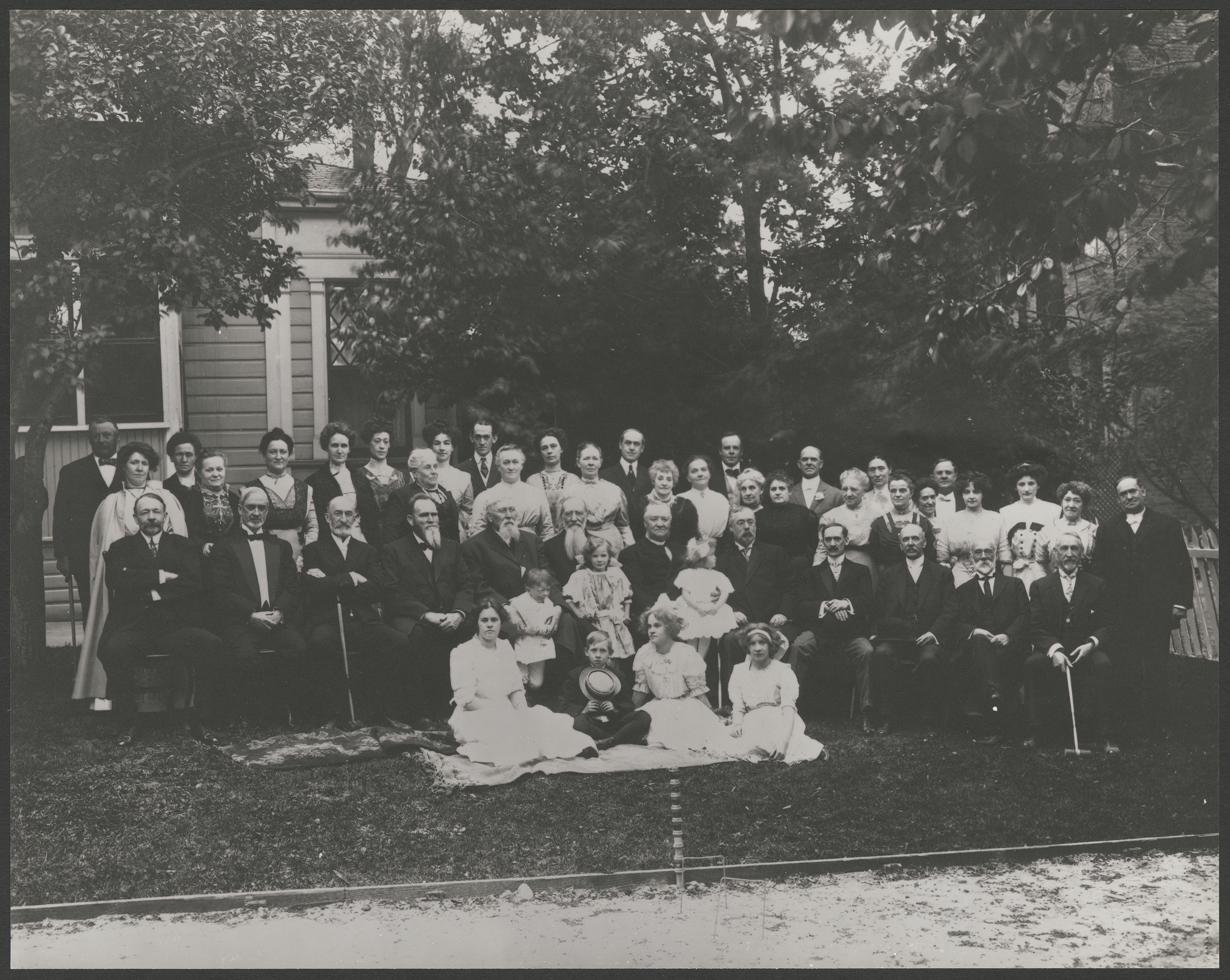
Charles Nibley, second from the left of the seated row of men, in front of the house of J.G. McDonald in 1911

Nibley was called as the presiding bishop of the Church of Jesus Christ of Latter-day Saints in December 1907 by Joseph F. Smith, with whom he had served in England a few decades earlier. It was during Nibley's term as presiding bishop that the LDS Church built the Hotel Utah.

"Charles W. Nibley was one of the most liberal industrialists of his time. But he had to compromise. Thus to finish the Hotel Utah, it was necessary to borrow $2,000,000, so President Smith sent Brother Nibley to Barney Baruch in New York to raise the money. He succeeded, and President Smith was delighted; but he was also alarmed when he heard the terms: it would all have to be paid back in two years. "Charley, what have you done? How in the world will we ever pay it back in that time?" Not to worry, they would have the whole thing paid off in two years. How? "I'm going to build the largest and finest bar in the West in the basement of the Hotel, and will see that we will pay off every penny of that debt." President Smith went through the ceiling; which was it to be, the Word of Wisdom or fiscal soundness? The dollar won"

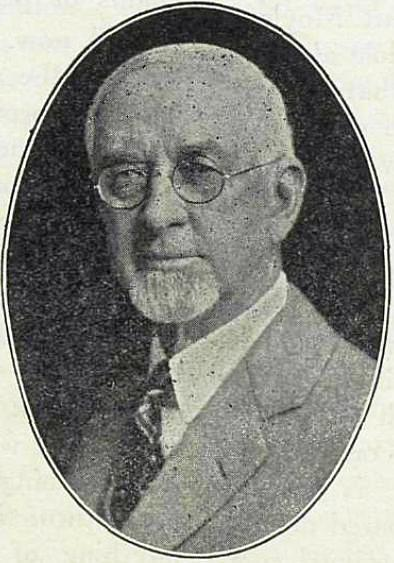
Nibley during his time in the First Presidency

=== First Presidency ===
In 1925, he was released as presiding bishop and was called as second counselor to Heber J. Grant in the church's First Presidency. He is one of the few individuals to serve in the First Presidency without having been ordained to the priesthood office of apostle.

== Nibley Park ==
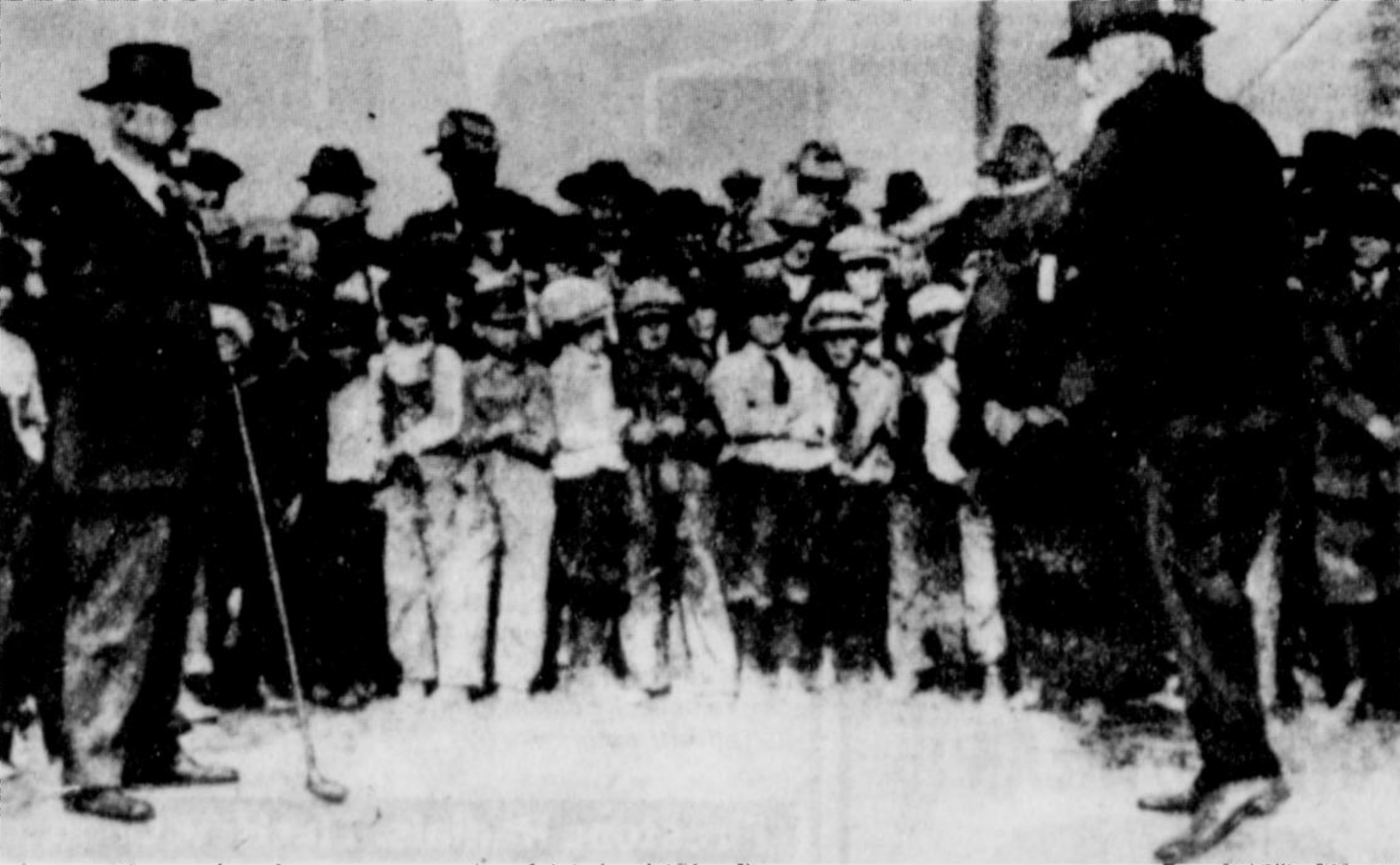
Heber J. Grant dedicating Nibley Park golf course in Salt Lake City Utah on May 20, 1922 by hitting the first golf ball off a tee. Charles Nibley is standing on the left.

In 1921 Nibley bought Wandamere (Calder) Park in Salt Lake City, and donated it to the city on Christmas Eve of that year. The gift to the city had the stipulation that it would never be sold and remain a golf course or be returned to the Nibley family. The idea was to provide a public golf course where the general public, both poor and rich, could enjoy the game of golf. At the dedication on May 22, 1922, Nibley said, "When I think that this generation and the generations of men and women yet to come shall find healthful enjoyment and rare pleasure here in playing that splendid outdoor Scotch game known as golf, and also in other outdoor amusements which shall not interfere with golf, that thought gives me the highest satisfaction and most genuine pleasure."

== Death and legacy ==
Nibley died of pneumonia in Salt Lake City, Utah; he was buried in Logan City Cemetery. Nibley, Utah is named after him.

Charles's son Preston became a church leader and author of several Mormon books. Hugh W. Nibley, a Mormon apologist and academic, is Charles's grandson, through his son, Alexander. Musician Reid Nibley was a grandson, and Martha Nibley Beck is a great-granddaughter.

== See also ==
- Council on the Disposition of the Tithes
- David Asael Smith
- John Wells (Mormon)

== Notes ==
=== Sources ===
- Christensen, Michael Elvin (1978). The Making of a Leader: A Biography of Charles W. Nibley to 1890. Department of History, University of Utah. OCLC 13937089.
- Christensen, Michael E. (1980). "Charles W. Nibley: A Case Study of Polygamy". Journal of Mormon History. 7: 101–114. JSTOR 23285965.
- Godfrey, Matthew C. (2007), Religion, Politics, and Sugar: The Mormon Church, the Federal Government, and the Utah-Idaho Sugar Company, 1907 to 1921, Utah State University Press, ISBN 978-0-87421-658-5
- Godfrey, Matthew C. (2013). ""My Dear Charlie": The Friendship of Joseph F. Smith and Charles W. Nibley". In Manscill, Craig K.; Reeves, Brian D.; Dorius, Guy L.; Haws, J. B. (eds.). Joseph F. Smith: Reflections on the Man and His Times. Provo, UT; Salt Lake City: Religious Studies Center; Deseret Book. pp. 181–197.
- Nibley, Charles W. (1934). Reminiscences of Charles W. Nibley 1849-1931. Salt Lake City, Utah: Stevens & Wallis, Inc. OCLC 10078714.

== External resources ==
- Autobiography of Charles W. Nibley
- In Memoriam: Charles W. Nibley. Provo, Utah: L. Tom Perry Special Collections, Brigham Young University.

The Church of Jesus Christ of Latter-day Saints titles
Preceded by Anthony W. Ivins	Second Counselor in the First Presidency; May 28, 1925 – December 11, 1931	Succeeded by J. Reuben Clark
Preceded by William B. Preston	Presiding Bishop; December 4, 1907–May 28, 1925	Succeeded by Sylvester Q. Cannon
