= George James Gibbs =

British engineer and astronomer (1866–1947)

George James Gibbs FRAS
- G.J. Gibbs, FRAS
- Born: 1866; London, England
- Died: 22 February 1947 (aged 80–81)
- Education: City and Guilds of London Institute
- Known for: Gibbs heliochronometer
- Scientific career
- Fields: Astronomy, engineering

George James Gibbs FRAS (1866 – 22 February 1947) was an astronomer, engineer, inventor and public science lecturer. He invented a heliochronometer 'which was able to accurately determine GMT to within a minute at any time of the year and at any latitude', the patrons of which included H.M. The King and most of the large country house gardens of his time in England, including those designed by Lutyens and Mawson. The accuracy of Gibbs's heliochronometer 'was only truly alleviated with the broadcast of the BBC pips in the 1920s'. He was also responsible for the design and erection of the Jeremiah Horrocks Observatory at Moor Park, Preston, Lancashire and was recognised as one of the leading hydraulic engineers in Lancashire.

== Early life ==
George James Gibbs was born in London in 1866. He was educated at Bedford Modern School, where he was head boy, and afterwards won an engineering scholarship to the City and Guilds of London Institute. Gibbs had an enduring love of astronomy from his school days, something that continued during his training as an engineer.

== Engineering ==
After qualifying as an engineer, Gibbs became a draughtsman and assistant engineer to Mr. A. R. Sennett. Between 1894 and 1902 Gibbs was a crane draughtsman to Grafton & Company of Bedford and was elected a Member of the Institution of Engineers in 1902. He was later an engineer to Mr. H. Gibbs of Bradford and was thereafter Chief Engineer to Porter Pilkington Limited of Preston. In 1910 he became a private engineering consultant in Preston where he acted as a consulting engineer for numerous industrial concerns for the supply of lighting, power, heating and water engineering. He was recognised as one of the leading water engineers in Lancashire.

== Astronomy ==
Gibbs developed an interest in astronomy during his schooldays, made his own observations with a 4-inch refractor by Dancer and was elected Honorary Curator of the Preston Municipal Observatory, a position he held from 1910 until his death in 1947. He was a regular contributor to the journals of the Royal Astronomical Society and in 1914 was appointed a member of the Society's eclipse expedition to Härnösand, Sweden. World War I broke out during their expedition and the party had to be rescued by the Royal Navy although they had by then made their observations.

In astronomy, his obituary in the journal of the Royal Astronomical Society records his most prominent work as being the Jeremiah Horrocks Observatory in Preston, Lancashire. It was described as his creation from the 'drawing of the plans to the performance of routine observations with the 8-inch refractor'. He was keen to foster a love of astronomy in the locality through illustrations and lessons.

He was elected a Fellow of the Royal Astronomical Society on 12 January 1912.

== The Heliochronometer ==
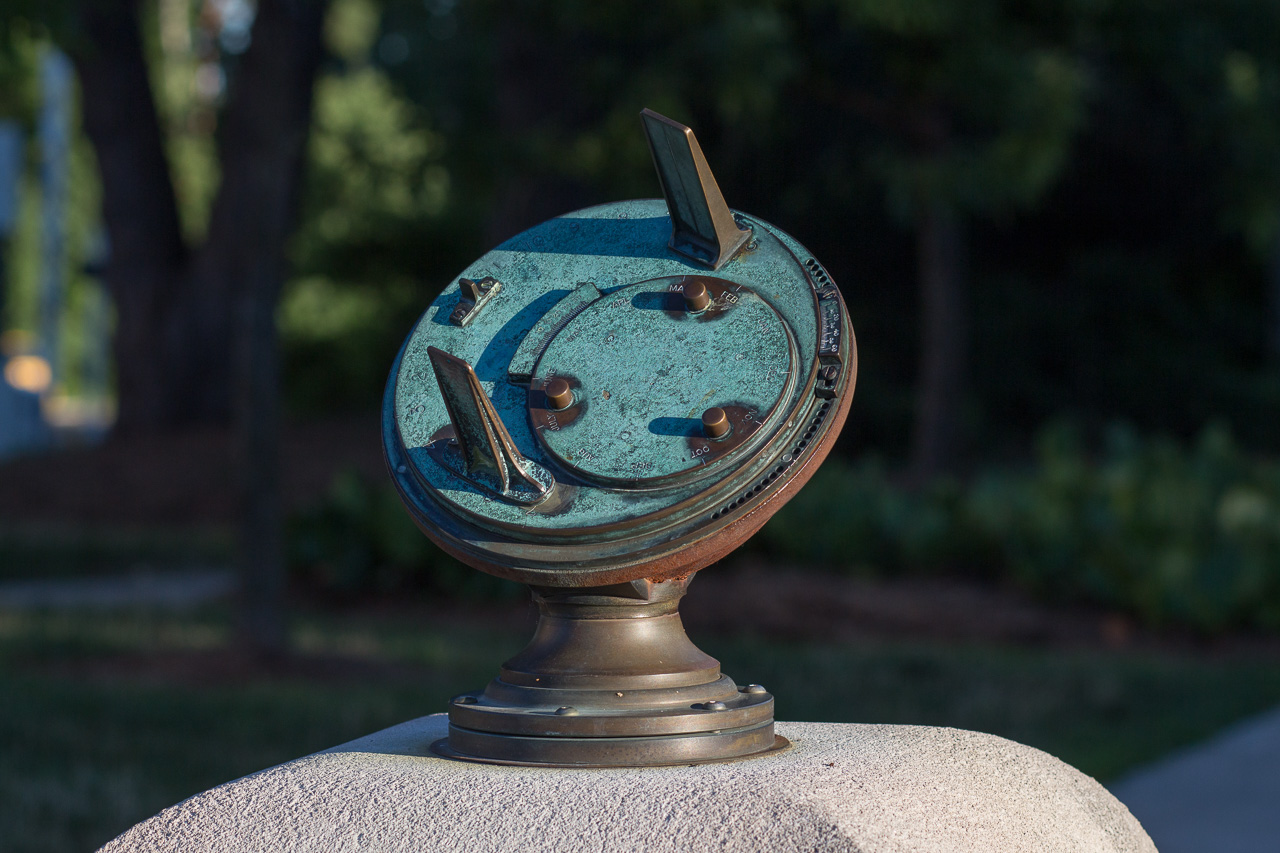
Heliochronometer of George James Gibbs

In 1906 Gibbs invented a heliochronometer. The heliochronometer 'which was able to accurately determine GMT to within a minute at any time of the year and at any latitude', the patrons of which included H.M. The King. The accuracy of Gibbs's invention 'was only truly alleviated with the broadcast of the BBC pips in the 1920s'.

== Public science lecturing ==
Gibbs actively encouraged the study of astronomy through public lectures and demonstrations. During his curatorship of the Preston Municipal Observatory he 'devoted an incalculable amount of time to the service of the public, willingly sacrificing his own interests in order to foster in others the enthusiasm which never deserted him'.

== Personal life ==
George James Gibbs was affectionately known as "G.J.G." His obituary as a Fellow of the Royal Astronomical Society described his character thus: 'The pleasant recollections of his courteous manner, kindly teachings and the institutions he has left are memorials to a true amateur of science, whose exceptional talents enabled him to be also a fine musician and skilful artist'. He married Annie (née Thomlinson) of Bedford who predeceased him in November 1936. Gibbs died on 22 February 1947 and was survived by a daughter.
