= George Gibbs (priest) =

George Meade Gibbs, MA was archdeacon of Saint Kitts from 1861 until 1882.

He was educated at Trinity College, Dublin; and ordained in 1849. After curacies in Derby, Southwark and Wonston he was Rector of St. George, Basssseterre from 1861 to 1882.
