= Joseph Anderson (Mormon) =

Leader of LDS Church (1889 –1992)

Emeritus General Authority
- December 31, 1978 – March 13, 1992
- Called by: Spencer W. Kimball

First Quorum of the Seventy
- October 1, 1976 – December 31, 1978
- Called by: Spencer W. Kimball
- End reason: Granted general authority emeritus status

Assistant to the Quorum of the Twelve Apostles
- April 6, 1970 – October 1, 1976
- Called by: Joseph Fielding Smith
- End reason: Position abolished

Personal details
- Born: Joseph Anderson; November 20, 1889; Salt Lake City, Utah Territory, United States
- Died: March 23, 1992 (aged 102); Salt Lake City, Utah, United States
- Resting place: Salt Lake City Cemetery; 40°46′37.92″N 111°51′28.8″W

Joseph Anderson (November 20, 1889 – March 13, 1992) was the secretary to the First Presidency of the Church of Jesus Christ of Latter-day Saints (LDS Church) from 1922 to 1970 and was a church general authority from 1970 until his death.

Anderson was born in Salt Lake City, Utah Territory in 1889, the same year that Wilford Woodruff became the church's president. Anderson graduated from the Weber Stake Academy (now Weber State University) in 1905. He later served as a missionary in Germany and Switzerland.

Anderson became secretary to the First Presidency in 1922. On April 6, 1970, church president Joseph Fielding Smith released Anderson from his secretarial duties and called him to serve as an Assistant to the Quorum of the Twelve Apostles. When that calling was abolished in 1976, Anderson was ordained a Seventy and became a member of the First Quorum of the Seventy. In 1978, Anderson became an emeritus general authority and was relieved of his day-to-day duties as a Seventy. Anderson died in Salt Lake City at the age of 102 and was buried at Salt Lake City Cemetery.

Anderson is one of four general authorities to reach age 100. The others are former Presiding Patriarch, Eldred G. Smith, who in 2009 surpassed Anderson as the longest-lived general authority in LDS Church history, church president Russell M. Nelson, and emeritus general authority Robert L. Backman. Additionally, Ruth May Fox and Florence Smith Jacobsen, who served as the church's Young Women General Presidents from 1929 to 1937 and from 1961 to 1972, respectively, also reached the age of 100.

Anderson married Norma Ettie Peterson in 1915. The couple had three children.

== See also ==
- D. Arthur Haycock

== Selected BYU Speeches ==
Joseph Anderson gave devotional addresses at Brigham Young University, including:

- "Footprints in the Sands of Time" – May 4, 1975
- "What Is Man?" – June 14, 1977
