= LeGrand Richards =

American Mormon missionary and leader

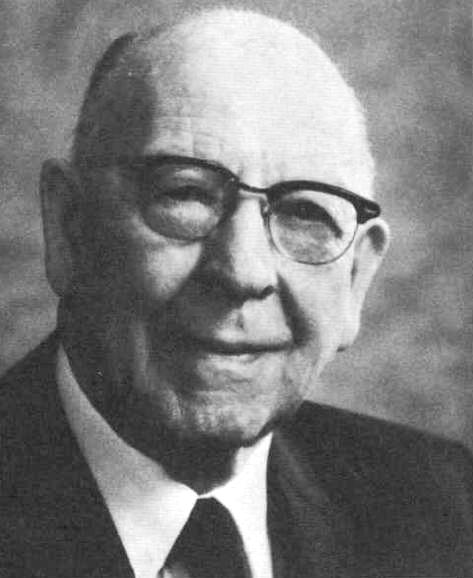

Quorum of the Twelve Apostles
- April 6, 1952 – January 11, 1983

LDS Church Apostle
- April 10, 1952 – January 11, 1983
- Reason: Death of Joseph F. Merrill
- Reorganization at end of term: Russell M. Nelson and Dallin H. Oaks were ordained after the deaths of Richards and Mark E. Petersen

Presiding Bishop
- April 6, 1938 – April 6, 1952
- Predecessor: Sylvester Q. Cannon
- Successor: Joseph L. Wirthlin
- Reason: Sylvester Q. Cannon became an Associate to the Quorum of the Twelve Apostles
- End reason: Called to Quorum of the Twelve Apostles

Personal details
- Born: February 6, 1886; Farmington, Utah Territory
- Died: January 11, 1983 (aged 96); Salt Lake City, Utah, U.S.
- Resting place: Salt Lake City Cemetery; 40°46′37.92″N 111°51′28.8″W
- Signature
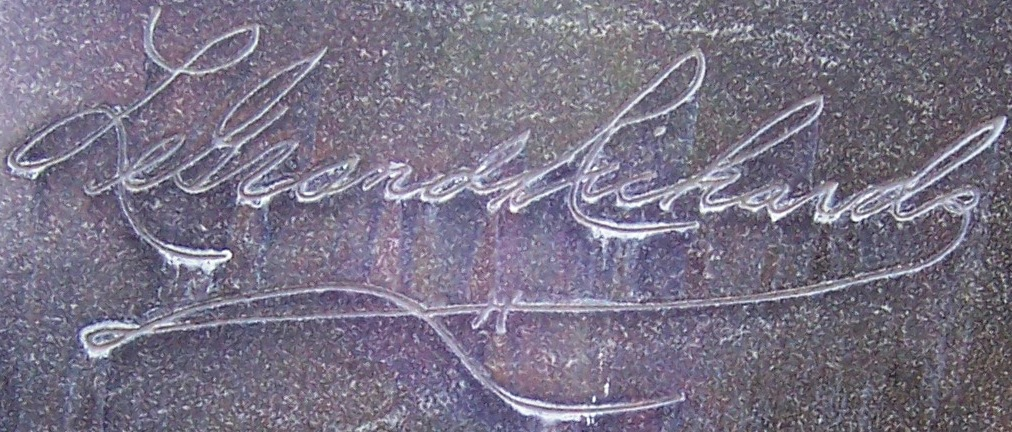

LeGrand Richards (February 6, 1886 – January 11, 1983) was a prominent missionary and leader in the Church of Jesus Christ of Latter-day Saints (LDS Church). He served as the seventh presiding bishop of the LDS Church from 1938 to 1952, and was then called as a member of the Quorum of the Twelve Apostles by church president David O. McKay. Richards served in the Quorum of the Twelve until his death in Salt Lake City, Utah, at the age of 96.

== Early life ==
Richards was born in Farmington, Utah Territory, to George F. Richards and Alice Almira Robinson. His father also served in the Quorum of the Twelve. As a young boy, Richards had several accidents that could have taken his life, including as a small child, when he was struck in the head by an axe as he approached from behind while his father was chopping wood. A few years later, Richards was thrown from a wagon by an agitated horse and both the wagon wheels rolled over his head. As a child, Richards attended the 1893 dedication of the Salt Lake Temple. His church service began when he served a proselytizing mission to the Netherlands from 1905 to 1908.

After returning from his mission, Richards lived in Portland, Oregon for a short time before moving to Salt Lake City where he held various jobs, including doing audits in the office of the Presiding Bishopric. In 1909, he married Ina Jane Ashton (who normally went by Jane) in the Salt Lake Temple. They were the parents of eight children.

== Church service ==
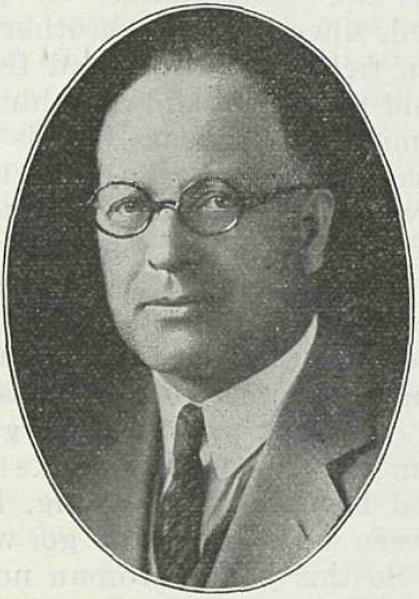
Richards while president of the Southern States Mission

In 1909, Richards served for a short time as a branch president over the Portland Branch in Oregon. Richards returned to the Netherlands as the presiding elder over the mission, accompanied by his wife, Ina Jane Ashton, from 1914 to 1916. Richards was ordained a high priest and bishop on June 29, 1919, by Charles W. Penrose, and presided over a Salt Lake City ward from 1920 to 1925. In 1926, he filled a short-term mission, primarily serving in Rhode Island. In the early 1930s, church president Heber J. Grant sent Richards to southern California with the plan to call him as stake president. However, the existing stake president called Richards as a bishop and convinced Grant to hold off on calling Richards as the stake president so local members would not feel that an outsider was being imposed on them as a leader. From 1931 to 1933, Richards presided over the church's Hollywood Stake.

In 1933 and 1934, Richards again lived in Salt Lake City, where he served on the stake high council of the Liberty Stake under stake president Bryant S. Hinckley. Richards served as president of the Southern States Mission from 1934 to 1937; he was called to this position to replace Charles A. Callis, who had been called to the Quorum of the Twelve Apostles.

Richards served as the church's presiding bishop during and after the Second World War and began to adopt building programs to deal with the increased post-war growth in membership of the church.

== Writings ==
Outside of his apostleship, Richards is probably best known for his widely distributed book, A Marvelous Work and a Wonder, which was first published in 1950. The commonly referenced work contains a comprehensive teaching outline designed to assist missionaries in their study and presentation of Mormonism. Based on a document titled, "The Message of Mormonism", which Richards developed in 1937 for missionaries during his tenure as president of the Southern States Mission, the book contains explanations and interpretations of many doctrinal positions of the LDS Church.

In 1955, Richards published Israel! Do You Know?, an effort to demonstrate the links between Jewish traditions and beliefs and Mormonism; this document was produced in conjunction with an LDS Church program aimed at proselyting Jews living in Southern California.

== Israel ==
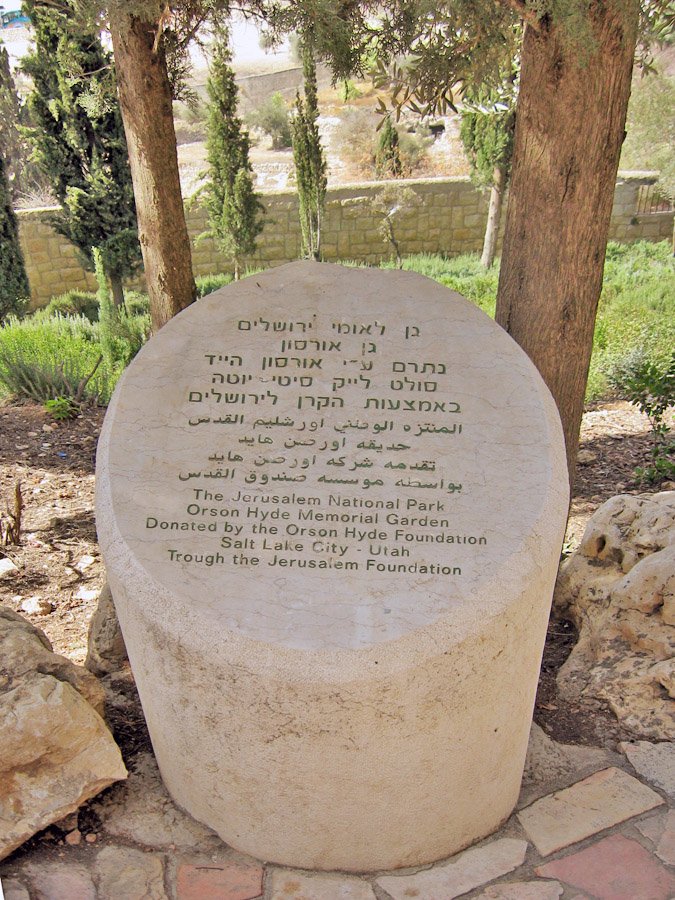
The Jerusalem National Park Orson Hyde Memorial Garden in Jerusalem, Israel

Richards also played a role in Mormon connections with Israel. He was head of the Orson Hyde Foundation, which coordinated the donations that were used to purchase the land in Jerusalem that became the Orson Hyde Memorial Garden.

== Tributes ==
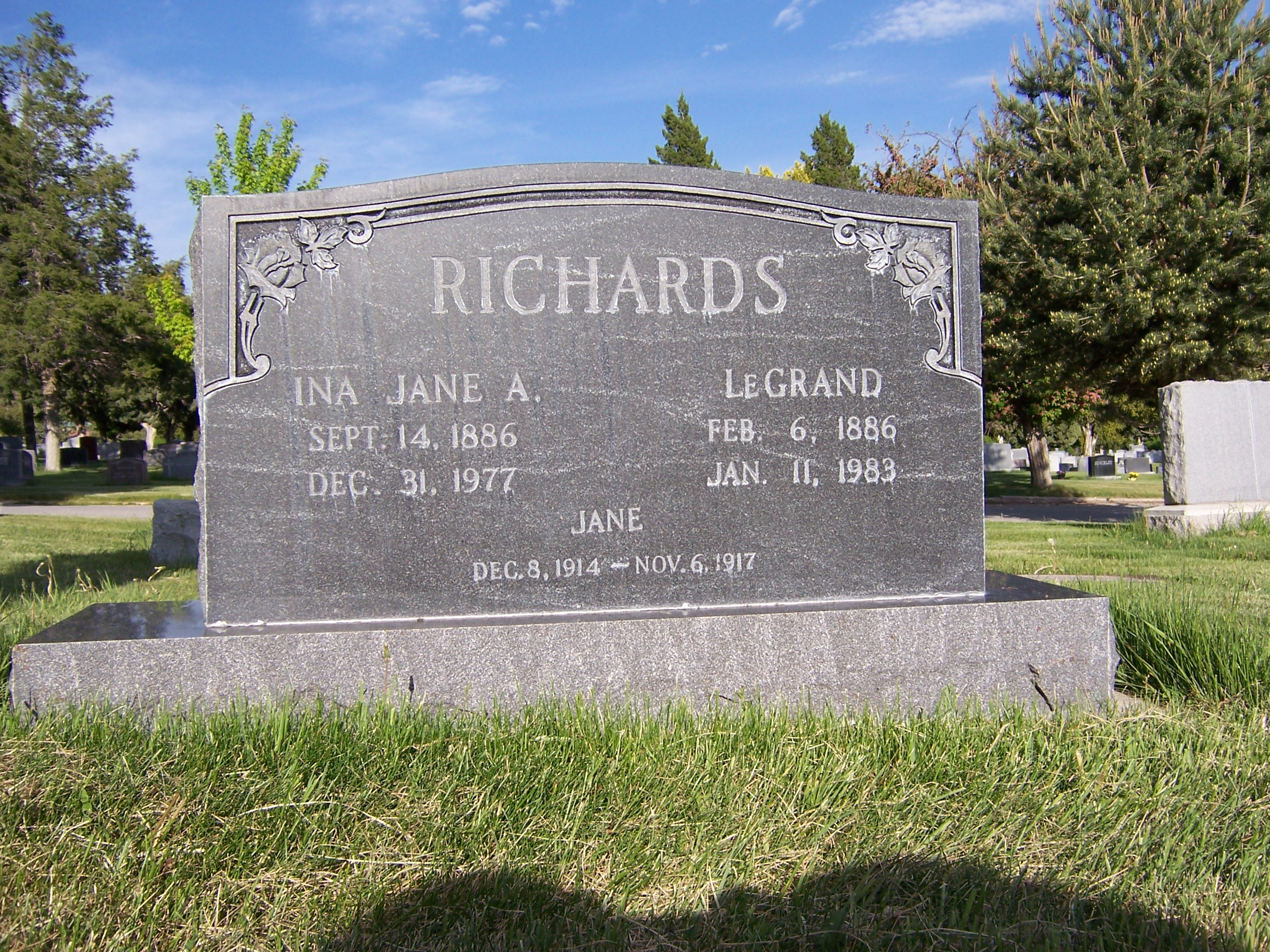
Grave marker of LeGrand Richards.

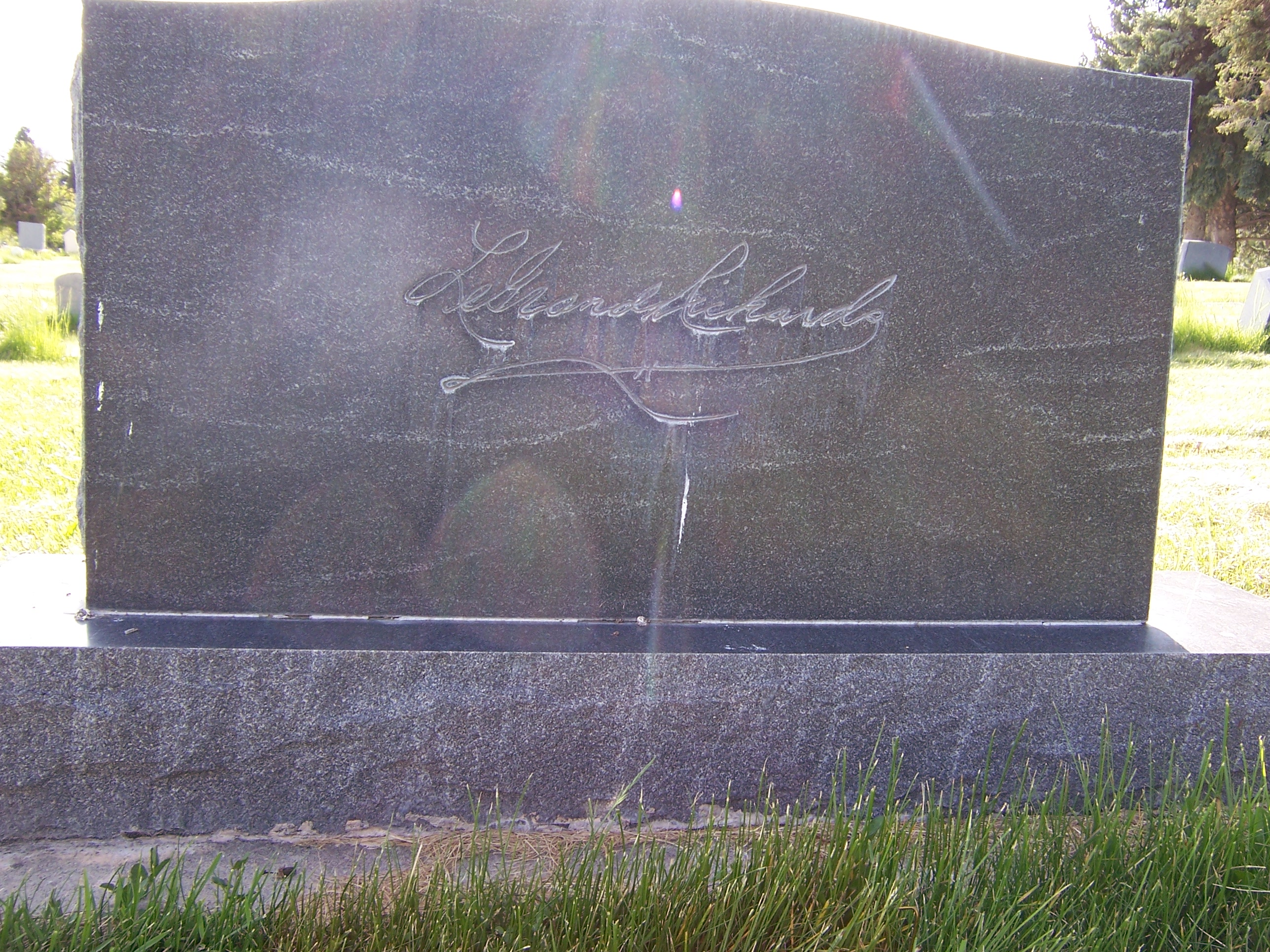
Grave marker rear side

In a memorial address read by his personal secretary after Richards died, church president Spencer W. Kimball paid tribute to Richards as

one of the greatest missionaries of our time. He reminded me of a modern-day Apostle Paul. I can think of no one who has borne his testimony to the truth of the gospel of Jesus Christ with deeper conviction or with greater fervor. With it all, LeGrand Richards was a perennial optimist and his words were a rare combination of wit and humor, comfort, encouragement, and wisdom. He rarely, if ever, delivered a message from a written text. He just spoke from his heart, drawing upon a lifetime of experience, study, and inspiration.

== Place in history ==
Richards was the longest-lived LDS apostle until David B. Haight; both his father, George F. Richards, and grandfather, Franklin D. Richards, served as President of the Quorum of the Twelve Apostles. Franklin D. Richards was also the nephew of Willard Richards, an earlier church apostle. LeGrand Richards is the grandfather of Tad R. Callister, a 21st-century leader in the LDS Church.

== See also ==
- Council on the Disposition of the Tithes

== Publications ==
- A Marvelous Work and a Wonder. Salt Lake City, Utah, first published in 1950, multiple editions. ISBN 0-87747-161-4.
- Israel! Do You Know?, 1954. "Israel! Do You Know? Book Review". Reviewed By: Tom Irvine.
- Just To Illustrate, 1961. Salt Lake City, Bookcraft ASIN: B0007F8N8Y
- LeGrand Richards Speaks, 1972. Salt Lake City, Deseret Book ISBN 978-0-87747-469-2

== External resources ==
- Media related to LeGrand Richards at Wikimedia Commons
- Grampa Bill's G.A. Pages

The Church of Jesus Christ of Latter-day Saints titles
Preceded by Marion G. Romney	Quorum of the Twelve Apostles; April 10, 1952 – January 11, 1983	Succeeded by Adam S. Bennion
Preceded by Sylvester Q. Cannon	Presiding Bishop; April 6, 1938 – April 6, 1952	Succeeded by Joseph L. Wirthlin
