= Common Council of the Church =

Body in the Latter Day Saint movement

In the Latter Day Saint movement, the Common Council of the Church is a body of the church that has the power to discipline or remove the President of the Church or one of his counselors in the First Presidency due to misbehavior. Its existence and status are uncertain and controversial, and the body has only been formally convened twice, once to try Joseph Smith in 1834 and once in 1844 when Sidney Rigdon was excommunicated in absentia. The Common Council of the Church is sometimes confused with the Council of the Church.

== Origin and duties ==
The council was first spoken of in a revelation by Joseph Smith on March 28, 1835:

And inasmuch as a President of the High Priesthood shall transgress, he shall be had in remembrance before the common council of the church, who shall be assisted by twelve counselors of the High Priesthood; And their decision upon his head shall be an end of controversy concerning him. Thus, none shall be exempted from the justice and the laws of God".

Church commentators have interpreted this to mean that the council that would have the power to discipline or remove the President of the Church or a member of the First Presidency would be composed of the Presiding Bishopric of the church and twelve other high priests asked by the Presiding Bishop to assist in the disciplinary procedures. For example, apostle John A. Widtsoe stated:

"Should occasion ever arise that one of the First Presidency must be tried for crime or neglect of duty, his case would come before the Presiding Bishop with his counselors, and twelve High Priests especially chosen for the purpose. This would be a tribunal extraordinary from which there is no appeal."

The twelve counselors could be composed of the members of the Quorum of the Twelve Apostles; however, there is no formal requirement that these individuals be chosen.

A later revelation to Smith on January 12, 1838, revealed more instructions, because of "wicked and aspiring men", "concerning the trying of the first presidency of the Church of Latter Day Saints for transgression". This revelation was not put into the Doctrine and Covenants.

== Trial of Joseph Smith ==
On August 11, 1834, the Council formally convened for the first time to consider charges made by Sylvester Smith against Joseph Smith after the return of Zion's Camp. Newel K. Whitney, the presiding bishop, presided at the Council, with John P. Greene, John Smith, Reynolds Cahoon, Isaac Hill, Samuel H. Smith, Isaac Story, Amasa Lyman, Peter Shirts, Truman Wait, Roswell Evans, Alpheus Cutler, and Thomas Burdick acting as the twelve high priests; Oliver Cowdery and Orson Hyde also participated as clerks to the Council, and Rigdon participated as a member of the First Presidency. The Council determined that Smith had "acted in every respect in an honorable and proper manner with all monies and properties entrusted to his charge."

Smith is the only church president to have been tried before the Common Council.

== Trial of Sidney Rigdon ==
The Common Council of the Church has only been formally convened once since Joseph Smith's trial. On September 8, 1844, Whitney convened a public meeting of the council with Brigham Young, Heber C. Kimball, Parley P. Pratt, Orson Pratt, Orson Hyde, George A. Smith, John Taylor, Amasa M. Lyman, W. W. Phelps, William Marks, Charles C. Rich, and Ezra T. Benson acting as the twelve counselors. The purpose of the council was to discuss possible discipline for Rigdon, who was a counselor in the First Presidency prior to Smith's death in June 1844. Since Smith's death, Rigdon had claimed the right to lead the church and be its "guardian" until a new First Presidency could be organized. The Quorum of the Twelve Apostles, led by Young, had also been claiming the right to lead the Latter Day Saints. At the trial,

"Very serious charges were made against Elder Rigdon for insubordination, for claiming to hold keys and authority above any man or set of men in the church, even superior authority and keys thereof than those held by the Twelve; and likewise he had ordained men to positions—places and offices not recognized as properly belonging to this church. Among other things he somewhere about this time predicted that the building of the [Nauvoo] Temple would cease and prophesied that there would not be another stone raised upon the walls of the Temple."

Rigdon had been asked to appear before the council but had refused. After a discussion of Rigdon's behavior by the members of the council, Whitney presented a motion to excommunicate Rigdon from the church "and deliver [him] over to the buffetings of satan until he repents". The motion was unanimously carried. The Latter Day Saints in attendance at the public meeting were then invited by Young to ratify the decision of the council. The vote was "nearly unanimous", with ten individuals voting in favor of Rigdon's cause.

== See also ==
- Disciplinary council
- Council on Disposition of the Tithes
