= First Presidency (LDS Church) =

Highest ecclesiastical body in the Church of Jesus Christ of Latter-day Saints

The LDS Church's current First Presidency

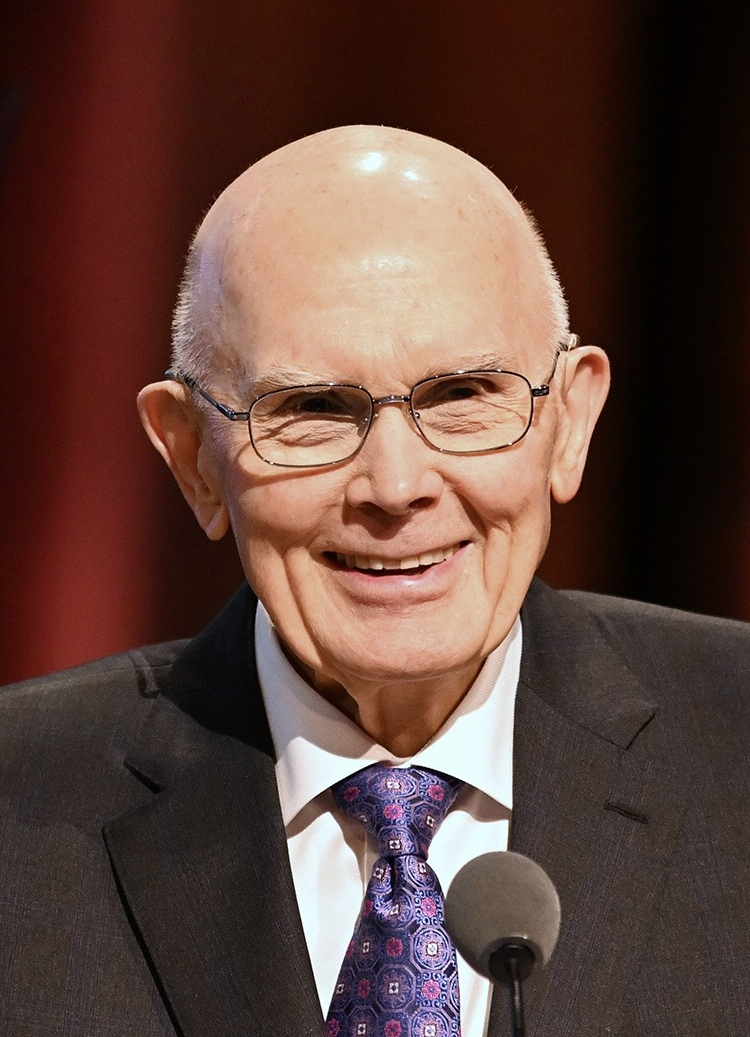
Dallin H. Oaks
President of the Church

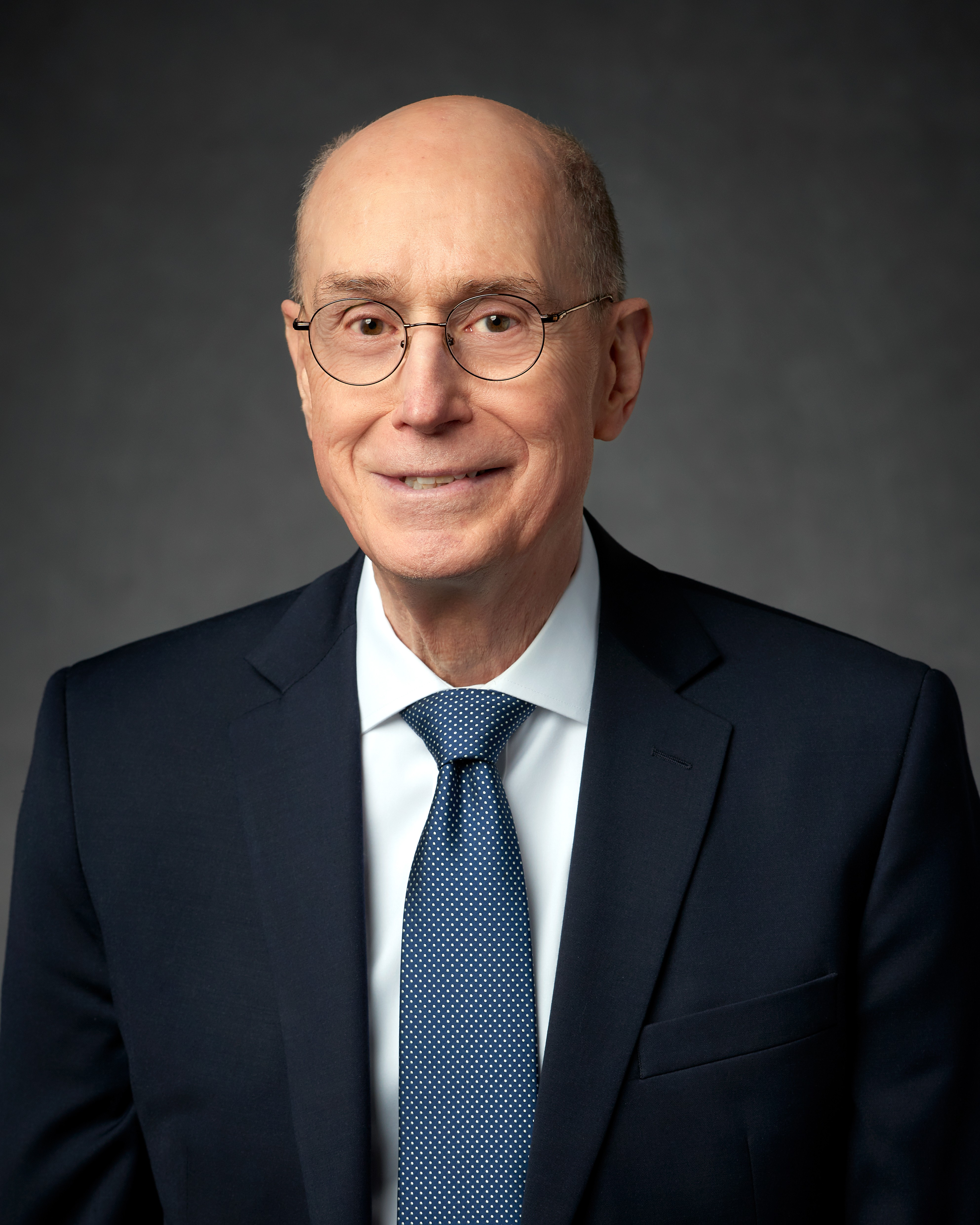
Henry B. Eyring
First Counselor

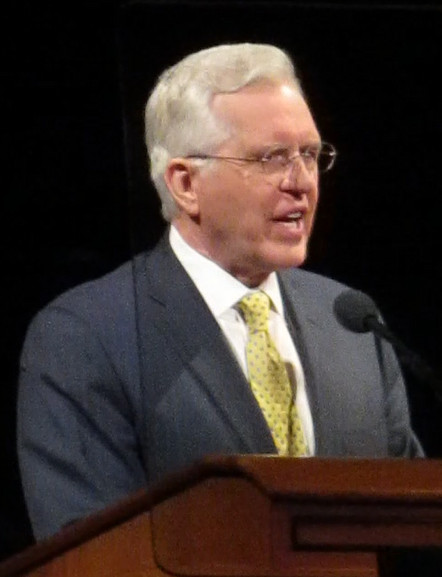
D. Todd Christofferson
Second Counselor

The First Presidency, also called the Quorum of the Presidency of the Church or simply the Presidency, is the presiding governing body of the Church of Jesus Christ of Latter-day Saints (LDS Church). It is composed of the president of the church and his counselors. As of October 2025, the First Presidency consists of Dallin H. Oaks and his two counselors, Henry B. Eyring and D. Todd Christofferson.

== Membership ==
The First Presidency is composed of the church's president and his counselors. Historically, and as indicated by church scripture, the First Presidency has been composed of the president and two counselors, but circumstances have occasionally required additional counselors (for example, David O. McKay had five during the final years of his presidency, and at one point, Brigham Young had eight).

Counselors must be high priests and are usually chosen from among the members of the Quorum of the Twelve Apostles, but there have been a number of exceptions of members of the church's Presiding Bishopric or the church at large being called to be counselors. Any high priest of the church is eligible to be called as a counselor in the First Presidency. There have been a few cases of counselors being ordained to the priesthood office of apostle and becoming members of the Quorum of the Twelve after they had already been set apart as counselors in the First Presidency, such as J. Reuben Clark. There have been other cases where counselors have been ordained to the office of apostle but not set apart as a member of the Quorum of the Twelve, such as Alvin R. Dyer. Other counselors in the First Presidency were never ordained to the office of apostle, such as Charles W. Nibley and John R. Winder. Whether or not a counselor is an apostle, all members of the First Presidency are sustained by the church as prophets, seers, and revelators.

Counselors are formally designated as "First Counselor in the First Presidency" and "Second Counselor in the First Presidency". Additional counselors have been designated in different ways, including "Third Counselor in the First Presidency" (such as Hugh B. Brown), "Assistant Counselor to the President" (such as John Willard Young), and simply "Counselor in the First Presidency" (such as Thorpe B. Isaacson).

Counselors serve in the First Presidency until their own deaths, until the death of the church president who called them, or until they are released by the church president. The death of a church president dissolves the First Presidency, and leaves the president of the Quorum of the Twelve Apostles as the senior leader of the church. The death or release of a counselor does not dissolve the First Presidency.

While each president is free to choose counselors, there are also non-binding practices concerning counselors. Often, the surviving counselors of the late president will be called as counselors in the new First Presidency, though a notably-infirm counselor may revert to his place among the Twelve Apostles, with a healthier man called as counselor in his place. On the death or release of a first counselor, the second counselor usually succeeds, and a new second counselor is named.

=== Title of members ===
The church president and his counselors in the First Presidency are each given the honorific title of "President".

=== Removal ===
A member could be removed by the current president at any time or if disciplined by the Common Council of the Church, although both actions are rare and removal for discipline has not happened since the early days of the church.

== Duties ==
The First Presidency is the highest ranking priesthood quorum of the church. The counselors assist the church president and work closely with him in guiding the entire church and carrying out the duties of the president of the church. The First Presidency has the theoretical authority to make the final decision on nearly all issues that might affect the church or its operations, but in practice, the First Presidency has delegated much of its decision-making power to members of the Quorum of the Twelve Apostles, the Seventy, the Presiding Bishopric, and local leaders of the church. Nevertheless, the First Presidency has retained its overarching decision-making power in a number of significant areas and may, at any time, choose to overrule the decisions of a lesser church quorum or authority.

In the case of an infirm president, his counselors may be called upon to perform more of the duties of the First Presidency that would normally be performed by the president. If needed, any number of additional counselors may be called to assist them, but the president of the church remains the only person authorized to use all priesthood keys. All members of the First Presidency are sustained by the membership of the church as prophets, seers, and revelators and given the keys of the kingdom when they are ordained as an apostle.

All members of the First Presidency are also members of the church's Council on the Disposition of the Tithes, which determines how the tithing funds of the church are spent.

== Members of the First Presidency who were not apostles ==
There is no requirement that counselors in the First Presidency be apostles of the church. The following men served as a counselor in the First Presidency during the years indicated and were never ordained to the priesthood office of apostle. J. Reuben Clark was not an apostle when he became second counselor in the First Presidency on April 6, 1933; a year and a half later, on October 11, 1934, he was called as first counselor and ordained as an apostle, becoming a member of the Quorum of the Twelve Apostles for one day.

- Sidney Rigdon (1832–1844)
- Jesse Gause (1832–1833)
- Frederick G. Williams (1833–1837)
- John Smith (1837–1844)
- Joseph Smith Sr. (1837–1840)
- William Law (1841–1844)
- John C. Bennett (1841–1842)
- John R. Winder (1901–1910)
- Charles W. Nibley (1925–1931)
- Thorpe B. Isaacson (1965–1970)

== Counselors in the First Presidency not retained upon reorganization ==
- John Smith, Assistant Counselor to Joseph Smith, not retained as a counselor by Brigham Young
- Amasa M. Lyman, Assistant Counselor to Joseph Smith, not retained as a counselor by Brigham Young
- John Willard Young, First Counselor to Brigham Young, not retained as a counselor by John Taylor
- Daniel H. Wells, Second Counselor to Brigham Young, not retained as a counselor by John Taylor
- Brigham Young Jr., Lorenzo Snow, and Albert Carrington, assistant counselors to Brigham Young, not retained as counselors by John Taylor
- Rudger Clawson, called as Second Counselor to Lorenzo Snow, not retained as a counselor by Joseph F. Smith
- Hugh B. Brown, First Counselor to David O. McKay, not retained as a counselor by Joseph Fielding Smith
- Thorpe B. Isaacson and Alvin R. Dyer, counselors to David O. McKay, not retained as counselors by Joseph Fielding Smith
- Marion G. Romney, First Counselor to Spencer W. Kimball, not retained as a counselor by Ezra Taft Benson
- Dieter F. Uchtdorf, Second Counselor to Thomas S. Monson, not retained as a counselor by Russell M. Nelson

== Secretary to the First Presidency ==
The church employs a secretary to assist the First Presidency in its administrative duties. The position is a paid employment position and the incumbent is not a member of the First Presidency or a general authority of the church. However, it is common for letters from the office of the First Presidency to private individuals to bear the signature of the secretary, as opposed to members of the First Presidency.

The First Presidency also employs assistant secretaries and press secretaries. When David O. McKay became church president in 1951, he continued with his longtime personal secretary, Clare Middlemiss, and moved the existing secretary, Joseph Anderson, into the newly created First Presidency's office. D. Arthur Haycock also served as personal secretary to several church presidents in the 20th century.

=== List of secretaries ===
- George W. Robinson (1838–1840)
- George Reynolds (1865–1909)
- George F. Gibbs (1909–1922)
- Joseph Anderson (1922–1970)
- Francis M. Gibbons (1970–1986)
- F. Michael Watson (1986–2008)
- Brook P. Hales (2008–present)

== See also ==
- Chronology of the First Presidency (LDS Church)
- Council of the Church
- List of general authorities of The Church of Jesus Christ of Latter-day Saints
