= George Gibb (footballer) =

Scottish footballer

Personal information
- Full name: George Gibb
- Date of birth: 1891
- Place of birth: Wishaw, Scotland
- Date of death: 7 June 1917 (aged 25)
- Place of death: Pas-de-Calais, France
- Positions: Left half; full back

Senior career*
Years	Team	Apps	(Gls)
–1914	Cambuslang Rangers	41	(0)
1914–1917	Third Lanark	38	(0)
- * Club domestic league appearances and goals

George Gibb (1891 – 7 June 1917) was a Scottish professional footballer who played in the Scottish League for Third Lanark as a left half.

== Personal life ==
Gibb was serving as an acting lance sergeant in the 1st/9th (Glasgow Highlanders) Battalion of the Highland Light Infantry during the First World War when he died of wounds on 7 June 1917. He was buried in Étaples Military Cemetery.
