= President of the Church of Jesus Christ of Latter-day Saints =

Highest office of the LDS church

President of The Church of Jesus Christ of Latter-day Saints
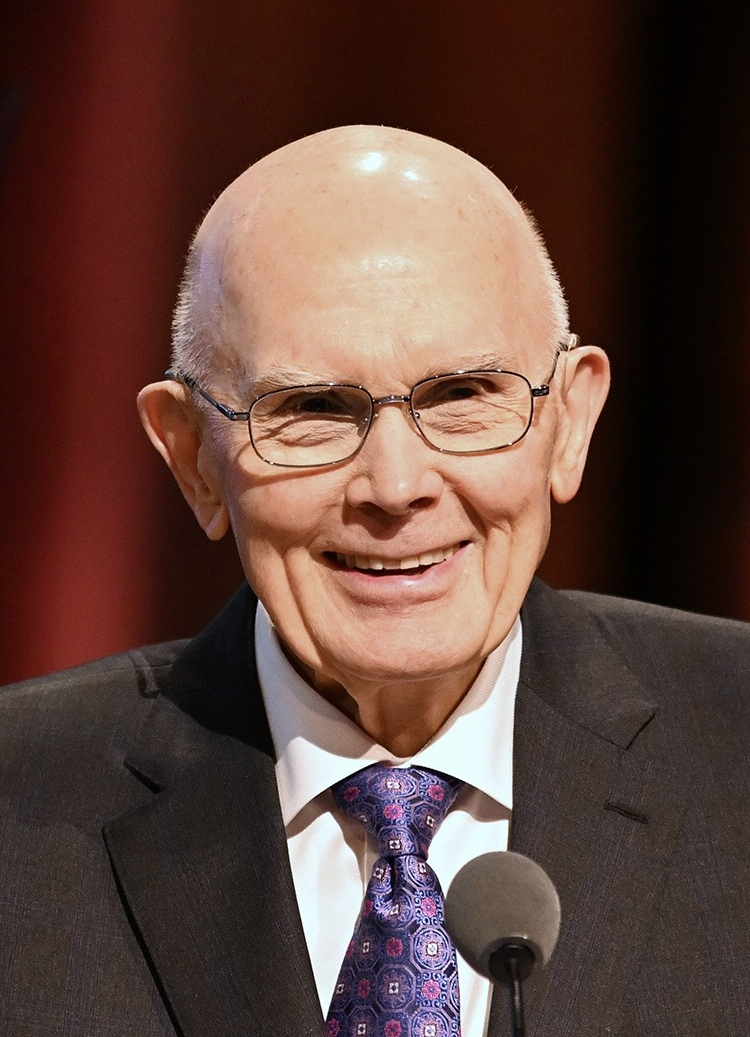
- Incumbent; Dallin H. Oaks since October 14, 2025
- Style: President
- Member of: First Presidency
- Seat: Salt Lake City, Utah
- Appointer: Quorum of the Twelve Apostles
- Term length: Life tenure
- First holder: Joseph Smith

The president of the church is the highest office of the Church of Jesus Christ of Latter-day Saints (LDS Church). It was the office originally held by Joseph Smith, the church's founder. The church's president is its leader and is head of the First Presidency, its highest governing body. Latter-day Saints consider the president of the church to be a "prophet, seer, and revelator" and refer to him as "the Prophet", a title that was originally given to Smith. When the name of the president is used by adherents, it is usually prefaced by the title "President". Latter-day Saints consider the church's president to be God's spokesman to the entire world and the highest priesthood authority on earth, with the exclusive right to receive revelations from God on behalf of the entire church and the entire world.

The president of the church serves as the head of both the Council on the Disposition of the Tithes and the Council of the Church. The president of the church also serves as the ex officio chairman of the Church Boards of Trustees/Education.

== History ==
=== Joseph Smith ===
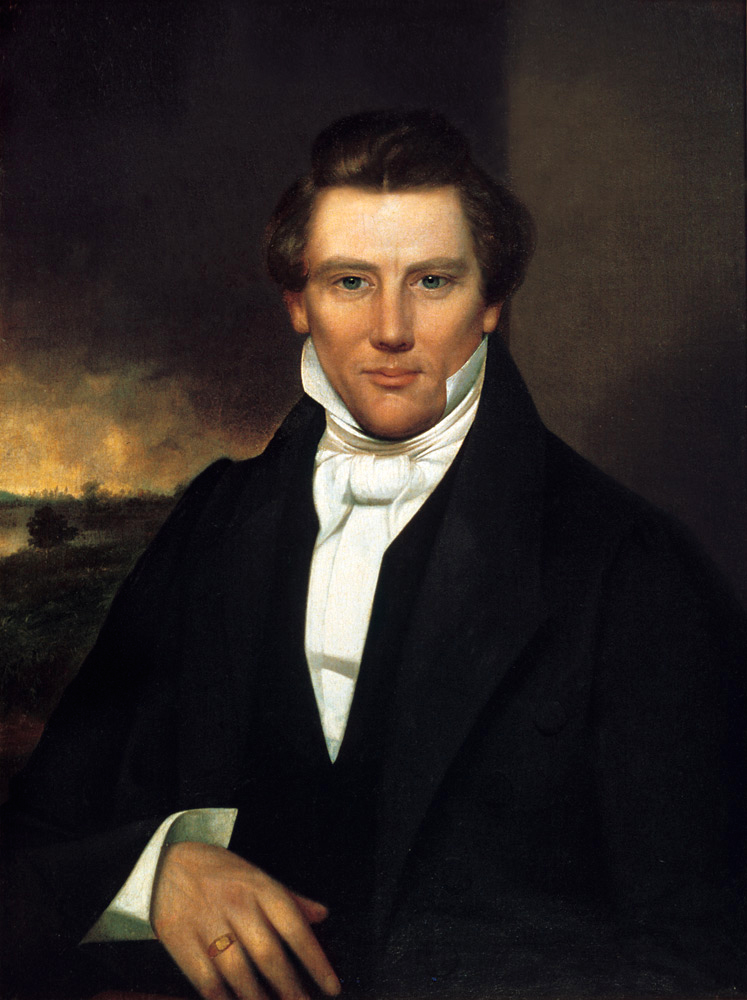
Joseph Smith, the founder of the Latter-day Saint movement

The concept that the Church of Christ would have a single presiding officer arose in late 1831. Initially, after the church's formation on April 6, 1830, Joseph Smith referred to himself as "an apostle of Jesus Christ, and elder of the church". However, there was another apostle, Oliver Cowdery, and several other elders of the church, making the formal hierarchy of the church unclear.

In September 1830, after Hiram Page said he had received revelations for the church, a revelation to Smith stated that "no one shall be appointed to receive commandments and revelations in this church excepting my servant Joseph Smith, Jun., for he receiveth them even as Moses." That established Smith's exclusive right to lead the church.

In early June 1831, (Note: Different accounts of this meeting give the date as June 3, 4, or 6. Bushman considers June 3 to be the "best guess" for the date.) Smith was ordained to the "high priesthood," (Note: In the Minute Book 2 entry, Smith first ordains Lyman Wight and four other men "to the high priesthood," and Wight in turn ordains eighteen other men, including Smith, "to the high priesthood.") (Note: Compare this with the Restoration of the Aaronic Priesthood, where Smith first baptizes Oliver Cowdery, and is then in turn baptized by Cowdery.) along with twenty-two other men, including prominent figures in the church such as Hyrum Smith, Parley P. Pratt, and Martin Harris. As "high priests", they were higher in the priesthood hierarchy than the elders of the church. However, it was still unclear whether Smith's and Cowdery's callings as apostles gave them superior authority to that of other high priests.

On November 11, 1831, a revelation to Smith stated that "it must needs be that one be appointed of the high priesthood to preside over the Priesthood and he shall be called President of the high priesthood of the Church... and again the duty of the President of the high priesthood is to preside over the whole church". Smith was ordained to that position and sustained by the church on January 25, 1832, at a conference in Amherst, Ohio.

In 1835, the "Articles and Covenants of the Church of Christ" were revised, changing the phrase "an... elder of the church" to "the first elder of this Church". Thus, after 1835, Smith was sometimes referred to as the "First Elder" of the church. The 1835 revision also added a verse that referred to the office of "president of the high priesthood (or presiding elder)", which had since been added to the church hierarchy.

=== Succession crisis ===
In 1844, in jail awaiting trial for treason charges, Joseph Smith was killed by an armed mob. Hyrum Smith, his brother and presumed successor, was killed in the same incident. Joseph Smith had not indisputably established who was next in line as successor to the president of the church. Several claimants to the role of church president emerged during the succession crisis that ensued.

Before a large meeting convened to discuss the succession in Nauvoo, Illinois, Sidney Rigdon, the senior surviving member of the church's First Presidency, argued there could be no successor to the deceased prophet and that he should be made the "Protector" of the church. Brigham Young opposed that reasoning and motion, as Smith had earlier recorded a revelation, which stated the Quorum of the Twelve Apostles was "equal in authority and power" to the First Presidency, so Young claimed that the leadership of the church fell to the Twelve Apostles. Most who were in attendance were persuaded that the Quorum of the Twelve Apostles should lead the church and Young was sustained as "the president of the quorum of the Twelve and first presidency of the church," thereby assuming leadership of the church. However, Young was not ordained president of the church at the time.

=== Later developments ===
On December 27, 1847, three-and-a-half years after Smith's death, Young was ordained the president of the church. At the time, seniority was determined by the first date of ordination as an apostle. By that definition, Heber C. Kimball was the most senior. However, since he was called to the First Presidency, Orson Hyde, who was the next most senior apostle became the president of the Quorum of the Twelve. In 1869, Young changed the order of the seniority, placing Brigham Young Jr., who was the most recently called member of the Quorum, ahead of Joseph F. Smith. Smith had been in the Quorum longer, but Young Jr. had been an apostle longer.

In 1875, Young changed the definition of seniority to be determined by the longest continuous term as an apostle. Since Orson Hyde and Orson Pratt had been temporarily removed from the apostleship during the Nauvoo years, they were removed from their position and placed in seniority, based on when they were reinstated as an apostle. That gave John Taylor the highest seniority, since Kimball had died.

When Young died in 1877, Taylor assumed leadership instead of Hyde. Wilford Woodruff, explained in 1879, "Elder Taylor is the oldest in Ordination and that is why he presides today." The First Presidency was dissolved, and the previous members were ordained as counselors to the Twelve. Other men were called to fill the vacancies in the Quorum. When Taylor died, the pattern changed, and the members of the First Presidency rejoined the Quorum based on their seniority. In 1889, Wilford Woodruff was ordained as church president and Lorenzo Snow was the president of the Quorum.

When Woodruff died in 1898, his counselors returned to the Quorum based on the date they were ordained an apostle, placing George Q. Cannon and Joseph F. Smith below Brigham Young Jr. and John Willard Young. Heber J. Grant objected to that, arguing that seniority should be based on ordination to the Quorum rather than ordination as an apostle. Young argued that an apostle should not be demoted as long as he is worthy of the position.

On March 31, 1900, Snow met with his counselors, Cannon and Smith, and decided to change the policy to gauge seniority based on entrance to the Quorum, rather than ordination as an apostle. Part of the reasoning was the ordination of Brigham Young Jr was done privately by his father, Brigham Young, without the members voting on the ordination. That put Cannon and Smith ahead of both Brigham Young Jr. and John Willard Young. However, Brigham Young Jr. maintained his position as quorum president. Before Snow died, he instructed Smith not to wait to reorganize the First Presidency, which gave no time to John Willard Young to object. After this point, it became significantly less common for individuals to be ordained Apostles without also being called as members of the Quorum; the only examples since 1900 have been Sylvester Q. Cannon, who was ordained an Apostle in April 1938 but was not added to the Quorum until October 1939, and Alvin R. Dyer, who was ordained an Apostle in October 1967 and subsequently served as a counselor in the First Presidency, but was never added to the Quorum.

On November 23, 1918, Anthon H. Lund, the most senior apostle, was called to serve in the First Presidency. Rather than give up his title as president of the quorum, as had been done earlier, he maintained his title, and Rudger Clawson was given the title of Acting President of the Quorum of the Twelve Apostles. The church continues to use that pattern.

== LDS Church president ==
=== Current ===
Following the September 27, 2025, death of the 17th church president, Russell M. Nelson, Dallin H. Oaks was ordained and set apart on October 14, 2025, as the church's 18th president. Oaks was introduced that day as the new church president by Gary E. Stevenson, the senior apostle on the Church Public Affairs Committee, in a broadcast originating from the church's Conference Center. Oaks then introduced his counselors and the new leadership of the Quorum of the Twelve Apostles.

=== Succession to the presidency ===
In the LDS Church, when a president of the church dies, the First Presidency is dissolved, and the members of the First Presidency who were formerly members of the Quorum of the Twelve Apostles rejoin it. The Quorum of the Twelve, which may number greater than twelve with the returning members from the First Presidency, then becomes the presiding council of the church, with the senior apostle as its president. Seniority is determined by the time since joining the Quorum, not by age. The President of the Quorum of the Twelve becomes the highest-ranking official in the church, and by longstanding convention always becomes the next church president. The appointment is not made official until the Quorum of the Twelve meets to select and set apart the next president of the church.

Since the late 19th century, the Quorum of the Twelve has moved quickly to reconstitute the First Presidency within days or weeks of the late church president's death. However, Brigham Young presided over the church for three years as the President of the Quorum of the Twelve before the First Presidency was reconstituted after the death of Joseph Smith. The tradition of waiting for two to three years before selecting a new president continued until the 1898 death of the fourth president of the church, Wilford Woodruff.

Since then, the surviving apostles have typically met in the Salt Lake Temple on the Sunday following the late president's funeral, to select and set apart the next president of the church. That was done in 1973, and described in detail by N. Eldon Tanner to Brigham Young University students in 1978. At the next regularly scheduled general conference, the membership of the church have the opportunity to sustain their new leader by common consent, at a special conference session referred to as a "solemn assembly".

=== Seniority in the Quorum of the Twelve Apostles ===
Seniority in the Quorum of the Twelve Apostles is important, as the senior apostle presides over the Quorum and usually becomes the president of the church after the current president's death. Specific rules have been applied to unusual situations that have arisen over time, including a member being removed from the quorum by disfellowshipment or excommunication and later being restored to the quorum. It was decided that the removed apostle then loses his seniority in the quorum.

For example, Brigham Young decided that John Taylor was to be President of the Twelve and Wilford Woodruff would follow him in seniority because of the readmission to the quorum of Orson Hyde, who had been disfellowshipped in 1846, and Orson Pratt, who had been excommunicated in 1842. Young ruled in 1875 that when Hyde and Pratt rejoined the quorum, they became the newest junior members of the quorum and their previous service was not considered when calculating quorum seniority. Later, whether or not an apostle was a member of the Quorum and when the apostle was added as a member of the Quorum became an important factor.

For example, following the 1901 death of Lorenzo Snow, John Willard Young, ordained in 1855 but never in the Quorum, became the senior apostle. Brigham Young, Jr., ordained in 1864 and added to the Quorum in 1868, became the senior apostle serving in the Quorum. However, on April 5, 1900, the First Presidency and Quorum of the Twelve unanimously decided that the date an individual became a member of the Quorum of the Twelve was the relevant date for succession purposes, not the date an individual was ordained as an apostle. Thus, Joseph F. Smith, ordained an apostle in 1866 and added to the quorum in 1867, became the president of the church in 1901, since he was the living apostle who had become a member of the Quorum of the Twelve at the earliest date.

In another instance, Ezra Taft Benson left active status in the quorum for a time when he was serving as the United States secretary of agriculture in the Eisenhower administration. However, Benson did not lose seniority in the Quorum, and he became the president of the church upon the death of Spencer W. Kimball.

If the president of the Quorum of the Twelve has been called to be a counselor in the First Presidency, the most senior apostle not in the First Presidency is set apart and referred to as the acting president of the Quorum of the Twelve Apostles. At the death of the president of the church, the acting president of the Quorum of the Twelve retains his position in the quorum's membership, and the president of the Quorum of the Twelve takes his role as president of the Quorum.

== Establishing doctrine, infallibility, and opinion ==
When the church president is speaking in his official capacity, his words are not considered "infallible". Members of the church are considered not fully justified in their actions if they "blindly" follow the president. The church has counseled its members that they should reject statements that contradict what is found in church scriptures "regardless of the position of the man who says it". Instructions given or positions taken by the president of the church can be changed by a future president of the church because of the Latter-day Saint belief in "continuing revelation". It is accepted that a church president will occasionally revise or clarify instructions of past church presidents. Church apostle Ezra Taft Benson counseled to "beware of those who would pit the dead prophets against the living prophets, for the living prophets always take precedence".

Not everything said by the prophet is considered to be doctrine. Joseph Smith taught that "a prophet is a prophet only when he was acting as such". When the church president declares new doctrine, "he will declare it as revelation from God, and it will be so accepted by the Council of the Twelve and sustained by the body of the Church". If the doctrine is not accepted by the church as the word of God, members are not bound by it, even if it comes from the president of the Church. Some Latter-day Saints assume that statements made by the president in sermons at a church general conference or other formal church meeting would constitute statements made in the capacity of church president. Even then, the president may explicitly indicate that he is expressing only a personal opinion. However, individual members of the church may feel cultural pressure to follow suggestions from the president of the church, whether or not they would be considered authoritative.

Presidents of the church have taught that God will never allow the president to lead the Latter-day Saints astray and that God will "remove" any man who stands at the head of the church who intends to mislead its members. That is not a statement of belief that they are "infallible" but that their errors will not result in "the permanent injury of the work". Thus, the current prophet can clarify, correct, or change any previous teachings.

== Counselors ==
When a new president of the church is selected, he chooses counselors to assist him. Most presidents have had a minimum of two counselors, but circumstances have occasionally required more than two. For example, David O. McKay had five counselors during the final years of his presidency and at one point, Brigham Young had eight. Counselors are usually chosen from among the members of the Quorum of the Twelve Apostles, but there have been a number of exceptions where members of the church's Presiding Bishopric or persons from the church at large were called to be counselors.

Any high priest of the church is eligible to be called as a counselor in the First Presidency. There have been a few cases of counselors being ordained to the priesthood office of apostle and becoming members of the Quorum of the Twelve after they had been chosen as counselors in the First Presidency, like J. Reuben Clark. There have been other cases of counselors being ordained to the office of apostle but not set apart as a member of the Quorum of the Twelve, such as Alvin R. Dyer. Other counselors in the First Presidency were never ordained to the office of apostle, such as Charles W. Nibley and John R. Winder. Whether or not a counselor in the First Presidency is an ordained apostle, he is accepted by the church as a prophet, seer, and revelator.

Counselors are designated "First Counselor in the First Presidency" and "Second Counselor in the First Presidency", based on the order of being selected by the president. Additional counselors have been designated in different ways, including "Third Counselor in the First Presidency" (such as Hugh B. Brown), "Assistant Counselor to the President" (such as John Willard Young), and simply "Counselor in the First Presidency" (such as Thorpe B. Isaacson). The president and all his counselors constitute the First Presidency, which is the presiding quorum of the church. The next senior apostle to the president of the church is set apart by the president to be the President of the Quorum of the Twelve Apostles.

== Removal ==
Though there has never been a popular movement in the church to have a president removed or punished, he could theoretically be removed from his position or otherwise disciplined by the Common Council of the Church. The only president of the church brought before the Common Council was Joseph Smith, who was tried for charges of misbehavior made against him by Sylvester Smith after the return of Zion's Camp in 1834. The Council determined that Joseph Smith had "acted in every respect in an honorable and proper manner with all monies and properties entrusted to his charge".

== See also ==
- Assistant President of the Church
- We Thank Thee, O God, for a Prophet
