= Council on the Disposition of the Tithes =

Leadership body in the LDS Church

The Council on the Disposition of the Tithes is a leadership body in the Church of Jesus Christ of Latter-day Saints, composed of the First Presidency, the Quorum of the Twelve Apostles, and the Presiding Bishopric. The council determines how tithing funds of the church will be spent. The council oversees revenue, investments, and expenditures valued at billions of dollars per year. While the church produces an annual report and employs an independent auditing department which reviews its financial activities, it has not published full financial reports since 1959.

== History ==
On July 8, 1838, church founder Joseph Smith was directed by revelation to establish this council. At the time, the council members included the First Presidency, along with both the bishopric and high council in Far West, Missouri. The council met one time under Smith, on July 26, 1838. There is no record of the council meeting again under Smith.

The council did not meet again until 1943. In the early 1940s, J. Reuben Clark (then a member of the First Presidency) conducted a two-year review of early church history to determine how the current church could more closely align with original financial administration. He proposed, and the First Presidency and the Quorum of the Twelve accepted, that the council be reestablished and meet annually. It has met annually since 1943.

== Current membership ==
As of February 12, 2026:

Name:	Dallin H. Oaks
Born:	August 12, 1932 (age 94)
Positions:	18th President of the Church of Jesus Christ of Latter-day Saints, October 14, 2025 – present First Counselor in the First Presidency, called by Russell M. Nelson, January 14, 2018 – September 27, 2025; President of the Quorum of the Twelve Apostles (with M. Russell Ballard and Jeffrey R. Holland as Acting Presidents), January 14, 2018 – October 14, 2025; LDS Church Apostle, called by Spencer W. Kimball, May 3, 1984 – present Quorum of the Twelve Apostles, called by Spencer W. Kimball, May 3, 1984 – January 14, 2018
Notes:	A former professor of law at the University of Chicago Law School, a former president of Brigham Young University, and a former justice of the Utah Supreme Court.
Name:	Henry B. Eyring
Born:	May 31, 1933 (age 93)
Positions:	First Counselor in the First Presidency, called by Dallin H. Oaks, October 14, 2025 – present President of the Quorum of the Twelve Apostles (with Dieter F. Uchtdorf as Acting President), called by Dallin H. Oaks, December 27, 2025; Second Counselor in the First Presidency, called by Russell M. Nelson, January 14, 2018 – September 27, 2025; First Counselor in the First Presidency, called by Thomas S. Monson, February 3, 2008 – January 2, 2018; Second Counselor in the First Presidency, called by Gordon B. Hinckley, October 6, 2007 – January 27, 2008; Quorum of the Twelve Apostles, called by Gordon B. Hinckley, April 1, 1995 – October 6, 2007; LDS Church Apostle, called by Gordon B. Hinckley, April 6, 1995; First Quorum of the Seventy, called by Ezra Taft Benson, October 3, 1992 – April 1, 1995; First Counselor in the Presiding Bishopric, called by Robert D. Hales, April 1, 1985 – October 3, 1992
Notes:	Was President of Ricks College from 1971 to 1977.
Name:	D. Todd Christofferson
Born:	January 24, 1945 (age 81)
Positions:	Second Counselor in the First Presidency, called by Dallin H. Oaks, October 14, 2025 – present Quorum of the Twelve Apostles, called by Thomas S. Monson, April 5, 2008 – October 14, 2025; LDS Church Apostle, called by Thomas S. Monson, April 10, 2008; Presidency of the Seventy, called by Gordon B. Hinckley, August 15, 1998 – April 5, 2008; First Quorum of the Seventy, called by Ezra Taft Benson, April 3, 1993 – April 5, 2008
Notes:	Member, Boards of Trustees/Education of the Church Educational System
Name:	Dieter F. Uchtdorf
Born:	6 November 1940 (age 85)
Positions:	Acting President of the Quorum of the Twelve Apostles, called by Dallin H. Oaks, January 8, 2026; Quorum of the Twelve Apostles, January 2, 2018 – present Second Counselor in the First Presidency, called by Thomas S. Monson, February 3, 2008 – January 2, 2018; Quorum of the Twelve Apostles, called by Gordon B. Hinckley, October 2, 2004 – February 3, 2008; LDS Church Apostle, called by Gordon B. Hinckley, October 7, 2004; Presidency of the Seventy, called by Gordon B. Hinckley, 15 August 2002 – 2 October 2004; First Quorum of the Seventy, called by Gordon B. Hinckley, April 7, 1996 – October 2, 2004; Second Quorum of the Seventy, called by Ezra Taft Benson, April 2, 1994 – April 7, 1996
Notes:	Only the eleventh apostle to be born outside the United States.
Name:	David A. Bednar
Born:	June 15, 1952 (age 74)
Positions:	Quorum of the Twelve Apostles, called by Gordon B. Hinckley, October 2, 2004; LDS Church Apostle, called by Gordon B. Hinckley, October 7, 2004
Notes:	A former president of Brigham Young University-Idaho.
Name:	Quentin L. Cook
Born:	September 8, 1940 (age 85)
Positions:	Quorum of the Twelve Apostles, called by Gordon B. Hinckley, October 6, 2007; LDS Church Apostle, called by Gordon B. Hinckley, October 11, 2007; Presidency of the Seventy, called by Gordon B. Hinckley, August 1, 2007 – October 6, 2007; First Quorum of the Seventy, called by Gordon B. Hinckley, April 5, 1998 – October 6, 2007; Second Quorum of the Seventy, called by Gordon B. Hinckley, April 6, 1996 – April 5, 1998
Name:	Neil L. Andersen
Born:	August 9, 1951 (age 75)
Positions:	Quorum of the Twelve Apostles, called by Thomas S. Monson, April 4, 2009; LDS Church Apostle, called by Thomas S. Monson, April 9, 2009; Presidency of the Seventy, called by Gordon B. Hinckley, August 15, 2005 – April 4, 2009; First Quorum of the Seventy, called by Ezra Taft Benson, April 3, 1993 – April 4, 2009
Name:	Ronald A. Rasband
Born:	February 6, 1951 (age 75)
Positions:	Quorum of the Twelve Apostles, called by Thomas S. Monson, October 3, 2015; LDS Church Apostle, called by Thomas S. Monson, October 8, 2015; Presidency of the Seventy, called by Gordon B. Hinckley, August 15, 2005 – October 3, 2015; First Quorum of the Seventy, called by Gordon B. Hinckley, April 1, 2000 – October 3, 2015
Notes:	Member, Boards of Trustees/Education of the Church Educational System; Member CES Executive Committee of the Board.
Name:	Gary E. Stevenson
Born:	August 6, 1955 (age 71) Married: April 20, 1979
Positions:	Quorum of the Twelve Apostles, called by Thomas S. Monson, October 3, 2015; LDS Church Apostle, called by Thomas S. Monson, October 8, 2015; Presiding Bishop, called by Thomas S. Monson, March 31, 2012 – October 9, 2015; First Quorum of the Seventy, called by Thomas S. Monson, April 5, 2008 – March 31, 2012
Name:	Dale G. Renlund
Born:	November 13, 1952 (age 73)
Positions:	Quorum of the Twelve Apostles, called by Thomas S. Monson, October 3, 2015; LDS Church Apostle, called by Thomas S. Monson, October 8, 2015; First Quorum of the Seventy, called by Thomas S. Monson, April 4, 2009 – October 3, 2015
Name:	Gerrit W. Gong
Born:	December 23, 1953 (age 72)
Positions:	Quorum of the Twelve Apostles, called by Russell M. Nelson, March 31, 2018; LDS Church Apostle, called by Russell M. Nelson, April 5, 2018; Presidency of the Seventy, called by Thomas S. Monson, October 6, 2015 – March 31, 2018; First Quorum of the Seventy, called by Thomas S. Monson, April 3, 2010 – March 31, 2018
Name:	Ulisses Soares
Born:	October 2, 1958 (age 67)
Positions:	Quorum of the Twelve Apostles, called by Russell M. Nelson, March 31, 2018; LDS Church Apostle, called by Russell M. Nelson, April 5, 2018; Presidency of the Seventy, called by Thomas S. Monson, January 6, 2013 – March 31, 2018; First Quorum of the Seventy, called by Gordon B. Hinckley, April 2, 2005 – March 31, 2018
Name:	Patrick Kearon
Born:	July 18, 1961 (age 65)
Positions:	Quorum of the Twelve Apostles, called by Russell M. Nelson, December 7, 2023; LDS Church Apostle, called by Russell M. Nelson, December 7, 2023; Presidency of the Seventy, called by Thomas S. Monson, August 2017 – December 7, 2023; First Quorum of the Seventy, called by Thomas S. Monson, April 3, 2010 – December 7, 2023
Notes:	The thirteenth apostle born outside the United States (U.K.).
Name:	Gérald Caussé
Born:	20 May 1963 (age 63)
Positions:	Quorum of the Twelve Apostles, called by Dallin H. Oaks, November 6, 2025; LDS Church Apostle, called by Dallin H. Oaks, November 6, 2025; Presiding Bishop, called by Thomas S. Monson, 9 October 2015 – November 14, 2025; First Counselor in the Presiding Bishopric, called by Gary E. Stevenson, 31 March 2012 – 9 October 2015; First Quorum of the Seventy, called by Thomas S. Monson, 5 April 2008 – 31 March 2012
Name:	Clark G. Gilbert
Born:	18 June 1970 (age 56)
Positions:	Quorum of the Twelve Apostles, called by Dallin H. Oaks, February 12, 2026; LDS Church Apostle, called by Dallin H. Oaks, February 12, 2026; General Authority Seventy, called by Russell M. Nelson, 3 April 2021 – February 12, 2026
Notes:	Former president of Brigham Young University-Idaho and BYU-Pathway Worldwide
Name:	W. Christopher Waddell
Born:	28 June 1959 (age 67)
Positions:	Presiding Bishop, called by Dallin H. Oaks, November 14, 2025; First Counselor in the Presiding Bishopric, called by Gérald Caussé, October 3, 2020 – November 14, 2025; Second Counselor in the Presiding Bishopric, called by Gérald Caussé, October 9, 2015 – October 3, 2020; First Quorum of the Seventy, called by Thomas S. Monson, April 2, 2011 – October 9, 2015
Name:	L. Todd Budge
Born:	29 December 1959 (age 66)
Positions:	First Counselor in the Presiding Bishopric, called by W. Christopher Waddell, November 14, 2025; Second Counselor in the Presiding Bishopric, called by Gérald Caussé, October 3, 2020 – November 14, 2025; General Authority Seventy, called by Russell M. Nelson, April 6, 2019 – October 3, 2020
Name:	Sean Douglas
Born:	1 May 1964 (age 62)
Positions:	Second Counselor in the Presiding Bishopric, called by W. Christopher Waddell, November 14, 2025; General Authority Seventy, called by Russell M. Nelson, April 3, 2021 – November 14, 2025

== See also ==
- Council of the Church
- Common Council of the Church
- Finances of The Church of Jesus Christ of Latter-day Saints
- World Church Leadership Council
