= Reed Benson =

American academic and political conservative

- Born: Reed Amussen Benson; January 2, 1928; Salt Lake City, Utah, U.S.
- Died: August 24, 2016 (aged 88); Provo, Utah, U.S.
- Children: 9
- Parent(s): Ezra Taft Benson (father); Flora Benson (mother)

Academic background
- Education: Brigham Young University (BA, MA, EdD)

Academic work
- Discipline: Religious studies Education
- Sub-discipline: Homeschooling
- Military career
- Branch: United States Air Force
- Conflicts: Korean War

Reed Amussen Benson (January 2, 1928 – August 24, 2016) was an American academic and professor of religion at Brigham Young University who was the national director of public relations for the John Birch Society. During his career, Benson was noted for his political conservatism and advocacy of homeschooling.

== Early life and education ==
Benson was the son of Ezra Taft Benson and his wife, Flora Benson. Benson was born in Salt Lake City but raised in Whitney and Boise, Idaho, and in Washington, D.C. Benson earned a Bachelor of Arts degree in political science and history from Brigham Young University, followed by a Master of Arts in communication and a Doctor of Education. From 1947 to 1949, he served as a missionary for the Church of Jesus Christ of Latter-day Saints (LDS Church) in Great Britain. Benson was a United States Air Force chaplain during the Korean War.

== Career ==
=== Anti-Communism activism ===
In 1960, Ezra Taft Benson made a proposition to Brigham Young University president Ernest L. Wilkinson that his son Reed be used as a spy to "find out who the orthodox teachers were and report to his father." Reed had targeted LDS bishop and political scientist J. D. Williams for surveillance. Wilkinson declined the offer, stating "neither Brother Lee nor I want espionage of that character." Later in the 1960s and 1970s, members and advocates of the John Birch Society did conduct espionage at BYU.

In October 1962, Ezra Taft Benson sought permission from LDS Church President David O. McKay to join the John Birch Society but was denied. Shortly afterwards, Reed joined the society and was appointed Utah coordinator with McKay's tepid approval. In 1963, Reed was appointed coordinator for Southern Idaho. In 1964, he became the Birch Society coordinator in Washington, D.C., and eventually the national director of public relations.

Benson's activities within the Birch Society came under the scrutiny of the First Presidency of the LDS Church for using its meeting houses for recruiting and political meetings, issuing a statement in January 1963 directly condemning the activities of the Birch Society. Ezra Taft Benson complained to McKay that the statement seemed to be directed against him, and "his son, Reed, and Brother Skousen," McKay confirmed that it was. Apostle Hugh B. Brown, Assistant to the Twelve Henry D. Taylor, and apostle Henry D. Moyle were all critical of Benson's activities.

The LDS Church called Ezra Taft Benson on a mission to Europe in late 1963 in the hopes that his political zeal would be tempered. At the Ezra Taft Benson's farewell address on 14 December 1963, Reed Benson said that his father had been "stabbed in the back".

In 1965, Reed Benson endorsed the claim of Robert W. Welch Jr., that former President Dwight D. Eisenhower had been a Communist agent.

=== Civil rights movement opposition ===
Benson was critical of the civil rights movement, which he felt was being controlled by communists. In July 1965, the NAACP called for all Third World nations to refuse to grant visa to missionaries of the LDS Church for its "doctrine of non-white inferiority," and planned to protest the churches October general conference. In response, Benson wrote a memorandum to all Birch Society chapters instructing them to spread rumors that the protesters planned violent riots:

"It is common knowledge that the Civil Rights Movement is Communist controlled, influenced and dominated. ... when necessary we must adopt the communist technique in our ever present battle against Godless Communism. It is urged that in the coming weeks the Utah Chapters begin a whispering campaign and foster rumors that the Civil Rights groups are going to organize demonstrations in Salt Lake City in connection with the forthcoming LDS conference. ... A few well placed comments will soon mushroom out of control and before the conference begins there will be such a feeling of unrest and distrust that the populace will hardly know who to believe. The news media will play it to the very hilt. No matter what the Civil Rights leaders may try to say to deny it the seed will have been sown and again the Civil Rights movement will suffer a telling blow."

Soon a near-hysteria was created in Utah over imminence of feared upcoming riots. Rumors of professional demonstrators and rioters prompted the Utah National Guard to begin riot control maneuvers. The NAACP issued a statement in an effort to calm fears that they were planning a riot, stating, "The NAACP deplores the malicious and totally irresponsible rumors circulating in many sections of the state to the effect that Negroes are planning a riot at the LDS conference." There were no riots or demonstrations at the 1965 general conference, and the Birch Society's role in creating the rumors created resentment among many in the LDS Church.

=== Homeschooling activism and later life ===
Benson wrote his 1981 Ed.D. dissertation at BYU on the development of a home school. This was one of the first doctoral dissertations written in the United States on the subject of homeschooling.

From 1975 to 1978, Benson served as president of the Louisville Kentucky Mission of the LDS Church.

== Personal life ==
Benson lived in the Pleasant View neighborhood of Provo, Utah. In 2001, Benson and his wife, May Hinckley Benson, were honored with the Elijah Award for their contribution to the advancement of homeschooling. Benson adopted nine children, all of whom were homeschooled.

== Bibliography ==
- Prince&Wright (2014). David O. McKay and the Rise of Modern Mormonism.
- Dew, Sheri L. (1987). Ezra Taft Benson: A Biography. Salt Lake City: Deseret Book. ISBN 978-0875791104.
