= Dean Fausett =

American painter (1913-1998)

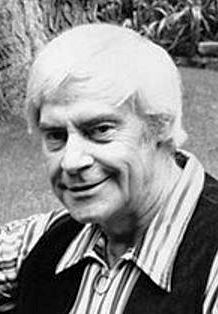
- Born: July 4, 1913; Price, Utah, U.S.
- Died: December 13, 1998 (aged 85)
- Occupation: Painter
- Relatives: Lynn Fausett (brother)

William Dean Fausett (July 4, 1913 – December 13, 1998) was an American painter. His career spanned over six decades. He painted notable figures like Dwight D. Eisenhower, Ronald Reagan, the Duke and Duchess of Windsor, Grandma Moses, Ezra Taft Benson, and Sir Alexander Fleming. His brother Lynn Fausett was also a painter. Fausett also purchased the historic house of Cephas Kent, Jr. in Dorset, Vermont and was instrumental in it the forming of the Kent Neighborhood Historic District.

== Early life ==
Dean Fausett was born in Price, Utah, in 1913. His parents were George A. Fausett and Helen Josephine Bryner Fausett. He was one of their eight children, and his brother Lynn Fausett was an artist also. Fausett's parents were pioneers to Carbon County, Utah. Fausett was raised as a member of the Church of Jesus Christ of Latter-day Saints.

Fausett received a scholarship to the Art Students League in New York City when he was only 16 years old. He was a painting assistant to his brother Lynn, and also to Hildreth Meiere. Fausett received instruction under Kenneth Hayes Miller. Fausett studied at Brigham Young University, the Beaux Arts Institute of Design, the Colorado Springs Fine Arts Center, and Eastern Illinois University. He traveled abroad with Meiere in 1935 to study art while she sketched in order to work on the St. Michael's Passionate Monastery Church in New Jersey. When he returned, he took classes at the Colorado Springs Fine Arts Center. His instructors included Boardman Robinson.

== Career ==
Fausett taught at the Henry Street Settlement House Arts and Crafts School in New York. In this capacity, he taught painting and drawing to underprivileged children. In the 1930s. In 1938, he was commissioned to paint maps of Ulysses S. Grant's battles in the American Civil War for the Works Progress Administration. Fausett and his brother Lynn had their artwork shows together in a Utah exhibit in 1939. Dean Fausett had painted a number of watercolor paintings and a series of lithographs which depicted various "Stages of Intoxication." He painted murals depicting maps of Grant's Civil War battles in Grant's tomb. These murals were painted over, however in the 1970s. They were restored and rededicated in 1995. Eisenhower also requested that one of Fausett's paintings, Derby View, hang in the White House study. The painting hung in the president's office for his entire eight-year term, being loaned from the Museum of Modern Art.

From 1939 to 1940, Fausett was the director of the Herbert Institute of Art located in Augusta, Georgia. He painted several murals during this time. Fausett's 1939 mural The British Come to See Augusta, commissioned by the Treasury Section of Fine Arts for the post office in Augusta is currently in storage at the Augusta Museum of Art. His post office mural in Rosenberg, Texas, LaSalle's Last Expedition was destroyed. Fausett also painted other murals for the United States Air Force and the United States Capitol. He was also commissioned to paint a series of sepia drawings of John Wesley Powell in 1964. Powell was a major in the American Civil War and the collection included depictions of his 1869 exploration of the Colorado River and the Green River. Fausett was later commissioned by United States President Dwight D. Eisenhower to be an artist-consultant for the chief of staff of the Air Force. This position allowed him to see up close and paint flying jets.

As a painter, he is recognized for his paintings of the American West. He painted for over six decades. His works were romantic landscapes. He painted portraits of United States presidents Eisenhower and Ronald Reagan. He also made portraits for the Duke and Duchess of Windsor, Grandma Moses, Ezra Taft Benson, Sir Alexander Fleming, Grandma Moses, and others.

Fausett has received numerous awards including the Carnegie International Prize. His works are displayed in the Metropolitan Museum of Art, Whitney Museum of American Art, and the New York City Museum of Fine Art. Fausett also helped found the Southern Vermont Art Center. He was inducted into the Vermont Council of the Arts. He became president of the National Society of Mural Painters. He was also inducted into Arts Students League of New York, the Vermont Historical Society, and the Utah Institute of Fine Arts. Fausett was also a member of the National Trust for Historic Preservation, the Academy of Arts and Sciences.

He was president of the National Society of Mural Painters from 1979 to 1984. Fausett was also named a fellow of the Guggenheim Memorial Foundation and the Louis Comfort Tiffany Foundation.

== Later life in Vermont ==
After World War II, in 1945 Fausett bought a home in Dorset, Vermont which he believed was the Cephas Kent Dwelling. This home was where papers were signed that declared Vermont a separate nation from England in 1776. He advocated that the site be a historical landmark. Due to his influence, the property and surrounding areas, the Kent Neighborhood Historic District were placed on the National Register of Historic Places in 1978. It was his permanent home after 1990. Fausett painted several pictures that were inspired by the Vermont landscape including Pawlet Hills and Warm Days.

During this time, Fausett was part of the Southern Vermont Artists Inc. As part of his contributions to the organization, he secured a permanent art center that began in 1950. He served as chairman of the organization from 1959–1960. Fausett was also a talented musician and was part of the board of the Symphony of the Musical Arts. He was also named a board member of the Manchester Music Festival. Fausett died in 1998.
