= Flora Benson =

American Mormon leader (1901–1992)

Flora Amussen Benson (July 1, 1901 – August 14, 1992) was the wife of Ezra Taft Benson, the 13th president of the Church of Jesus Christ of Latter-day Saints (LDS Church), and mother of Reed Benson, political activist.

Flora Amussen was the daughter of jeweler Carl Christian Amussen and his wife, Barbara McIsaac Smith. Flora was born in Logan, Utah, United States. Her father died when she was only 15 months old, however he was able to leave a good legacy and so she was raised in relative comfort. She attended elementary school in California and Utah, and graduated from Brigham Young College.

Amussen attended Utah State Agricultural College, now Utah State University, where she met Benson. At Utah State, she was a tennis player, winning the colleges women's singles title. She also served as student body vice president and president of the Women's Athletic Club on campus. She served as a missionary for the LDS Church in Hawaii. As part of her mission, she taught in the LDS Church-run elementary school in Laie, Hawaii. Her mother was later called on a mission to Hawaii and they served as companions in Honolulu.

After her return from her mission, Flora dated Benson again and they were engaged within two months of her return. They were married in the Salt Lake Temple by Orson F. Whitney who had been Ezra's mission president. At the time of their marriage Flora gave up control of many stocks and bonds to her mother so that she and Ezra would earn all their money together.

Immediately after their marriage the Bensons traveled to Iowa in a Model-T, camping along the way. In Ames, Iowa Benson studies home economics at Iowa State University while her husband worked on his master's degree. After that the Bensons returned to Ezra's home town of Whitney, Idaho where they ran a farm.

While her husband was Secretary of Agriculture, Flora on one occasion declined an invitation to the White House so that she could attend a choir performance by one of her daughters. She was however heavily involved in the 1956 Eisenhower reelection campaign. On occasion she would host Mrs. Eisenhower and the wives of cabinet members in her home. She would do so with only her daughters helping to prepare the meal, never hiring outside help. She also attended all press conferences and congressional hearing where her husband spoke.

Benson served with her husband in Europe during the 1960s, when he was president of the European Mission, based out of Frankfurt, Germany. In the LDS Church, she also served in a ward Relief Society presidency, as what would now be called ward Young Women president, as a member of a stake Young Women board, and as a teacher in both the Primary and Sunday School organizations.

In 1955, she was named Homemaker of the Year by the Washington D.C. chapter of National Home Fashion Magazine.

In 1992, Benson was given Brigham Young University's Exemplary Womanhood award.
