= Carl Christian Amussen =

Utah's first jeweler (1825–1902)

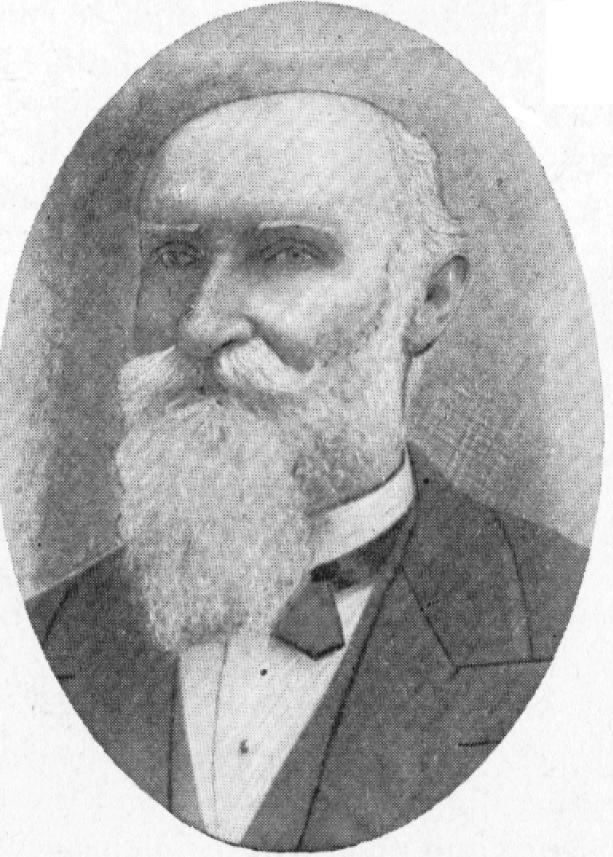

Personal details
- Born: May 20, 1825; Køge, Zealand, Denmark
- Died: October 29, 1902 (aged 77); Logan, Utah, United States
- Resting place: Logan City Cemetery; 41.7485°N 111.8045°W
- Spouse(s): Anna K. Nielsen; Martha McIsaac Smith; Barbara McIssac Smith
- Children: 18
- Parents: Karl Asmussen; Petra Asmussen née Johansen

Carl Christian Amussen (May 20, 1825 – October 29, 1902), also referred to as Carl Christian Asmussen, and with Carl at times spelled Karl, was Utah's first jeweler.

Karl Amussen, the third son of Danish sea captain Karl Asmussen and his wife Petra Asmussen née Johansen, was born in Køge, Zealand just outside Copenhagen, Denmark on May 20, 1825. Not wishing to follow in his ancestor's footsteps, Amussen apprenticed as a watchmaker, jeweler and dentist. His skill in jewelry-making was so great that he spent some time as court jeweler to the Czar of Russia. Additionally he was involved in that trade in Great Britain, Russia and Australia and circumnavigated the globe twice over the course of his lifetime. In 1857 Amussen moved to Christchurch, New Zealand where he opened a jewelry store. It was there in 1864 he learned of the Church of Jesus Christ of Latter-day Saints (LDS Church) from reading Parley P. Pratt's pamphlet The Voice of Warning. The stamp on the booklet noted that it had been published in Liverpool, England. Assuming that that was the headquarters of the church, he travelled to Liverpool. On arrival he was informed that the headquarters of the Church of Jesus Christ of Latter-Day Saints were actually in SLC, Utah. While in Liverpool he was taught more about the gospel and was later baptized into the LDS Church by Elisha H. Groves in 1864 and in 1865 moved to Salt Lake City, Utah. Amussen was then called to serve a mission in New Zealand where he organized an LDS congregation in Kaipoi.

In 1868 Amussen returned to Salt Lake City where he met Brigham Young and, upon Young's advice, purchased land on Main Street where he built a jewelry store. He brought supplies via covered wagon and the mirrors that once adorned his store were later used in the Salt Lake Temple.. The Amussen Building, designed by pioneer architect William H. Folsom, was the first fire-proof building in the Utah Territory. It was constructed of sandstone with a slate roof, cement basement and pane glass windows. The two-story store towered over the surrounding one-story adobe structures and remains standing to this day as a testament to its sound construction.

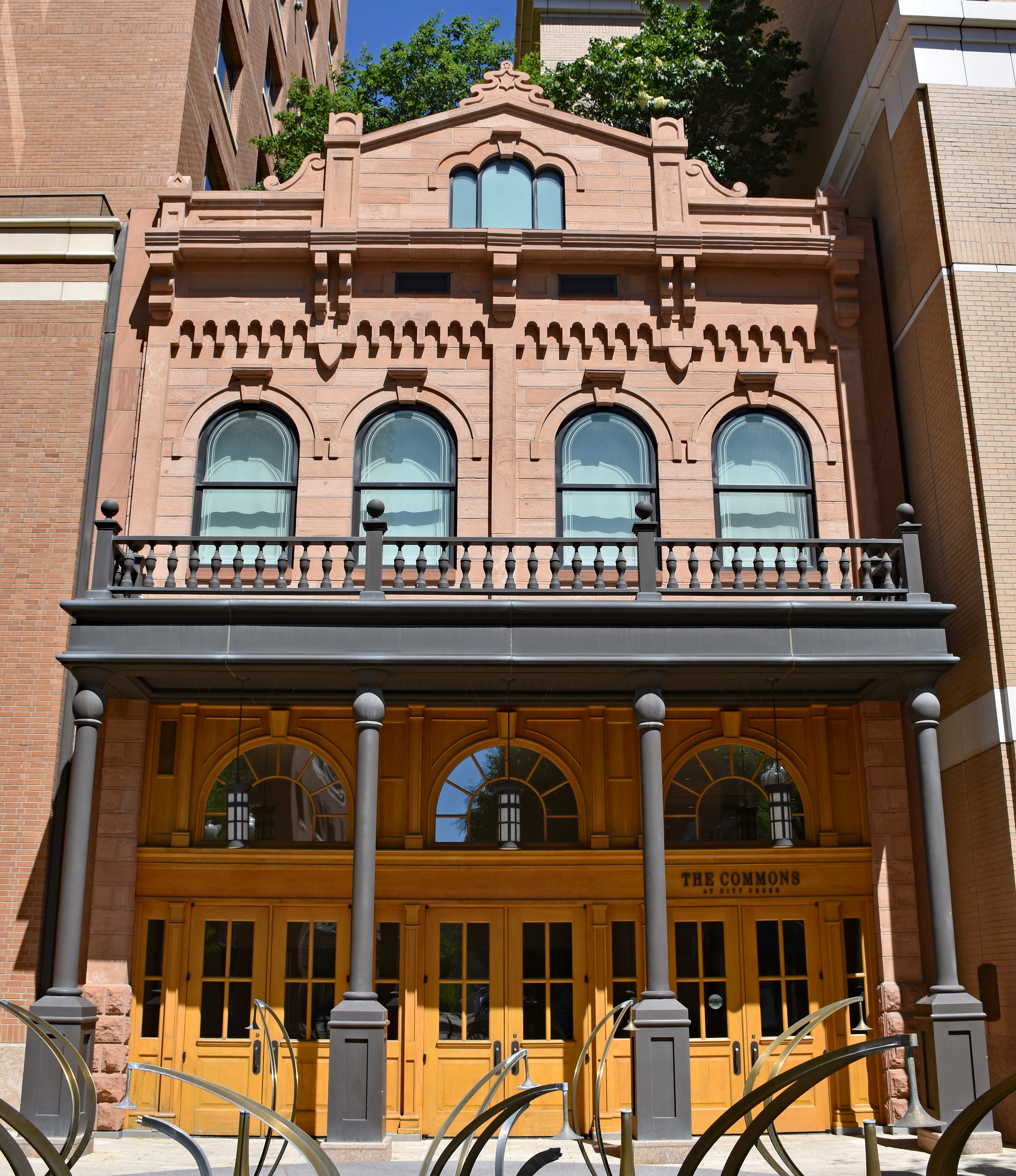
The façade of Amussen's Salt Lake City store is preserved at City Creek Center

Amussen was also connected with the early American department store, Zions Cooperative Mercantile Institution and the Utah-Idaho Sugar Company. Amussen served two missions for the LDS Church in Denmark and also later served a mission in Australia. He was ordained a Seventy by Joseph Young. After Amussen retired from the jewelry business he invested in real estate in Logan, Utah and owned business properties in the center of Logan.

He was a polygamist with three wives: Anna K. Nielsen, and sisters Martha McIsaac Smith and Barbara McIssac Smith. Amussen had 18 children by his three wives. His youngest child, Flora Amussen, born in 1901, married LDS Church president Ezra Taft Benson. For the last several years of his life Amussen resided in Logan, where his son Carl S. Amussen was later a prominent car dealer in the 1910s.
