= Ezra Taft Benson =

President of The Church of Jesus Christ of Latter-day Saints (1899–1994)

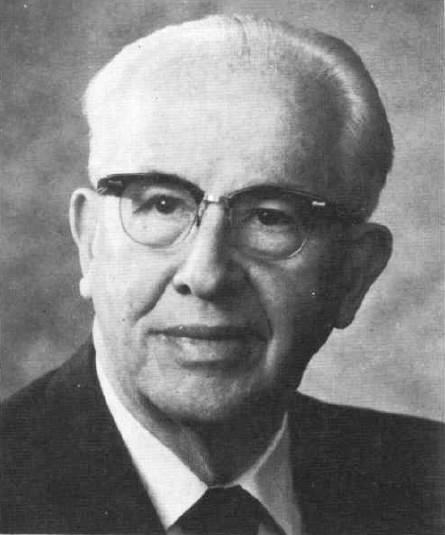
- Benson in 1977

13th President of the Church of Jesus Christ of Latter-day Saints
- November 10, 1985 – May 30, 1994
- Predecessor: Spencer W. Kimball
- Successor: Howard W. Hunter

President of the Quorum of the Twelve Apostles
- December 30, 1973 – November 10, 1985
- Predecessor: Spencer W. Kimball
- Successor: Marion G. Romney
- End reason: Became President of the Church

Quorum of the Twelve Apostles
- October 7, 1943 – November 10, 1985
- Called by: Heber J. Grant
- End reason: Became President of the Church

LDS Church Apostle
- October 7, 1943 – May 30, 1994
- Called by: Heber J. Grant
- Reason: Deaths of Sylvester Q. Cannon and Rudger Clawson
- Reorganization at end of term: Jeffrey R. Holland ordained

15th United States Secretary of Agriculture

In office
- January 21, 1953 – January 20, 1961
- Predecessor: Charles F. Brannan
- Successor: Orville Freeman
- President: Dwight D. Eisenhower
- Political party: Republican

Personal details
- Born: Ezra Taft Benson; August 4, 1899; Whitney, Idaho, U.S.
- Died: May 30, 1994 (aged 94); Salt Lake City, Utah, U.S.
- Education: Oneida Stake Academy Utah State University, Logan; Brigham Young University (BS); Iowa State University (MS); University of California, Berkeley
- Spouse(s): Flora Amussen (m. 1926; d. 1992)
- Children: 6, including Reed
- Signature
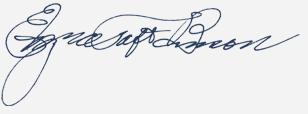

Ezra Taft Benson (August 4, 1899 – May 30, 1994) was an American farmer, federal government official, and religious leader. He served as the 15th United States Secretary of Agriculture during the entirety of both presidential terms of Dwight D. Eisenhower; he was the 13th president of the Church of Jesus Christ of Latter-day Saints (LDS Church) from 1985 until his death in 1994.

== Early life ==
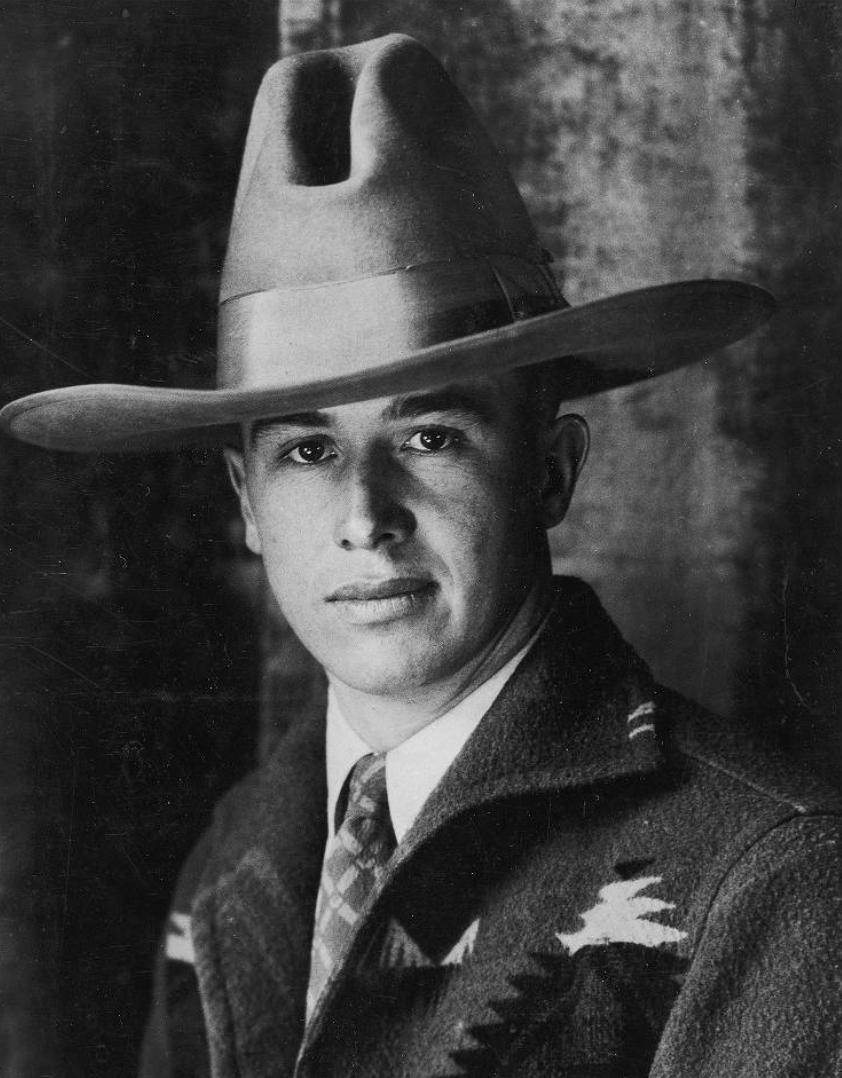
Benson at Brigham Young University, 1926

Born on a farm in Whitney, Idaho, Benson was the oldest of eleven children. He was the great-grandson of Ezra T. Benson, who was appointed by Brigham Young to be a member of the Quorum of the Twelve Apostles in 1846. When he was 12 years old, his father was called as a missionary to the midwestern United States, leaving his expectant mother alone with seven children. Benson took much of the responsibility for running the family farm and in the words of his sister, "He took the place of father for nearly two years." Benson began his academic career at the Oneida Stake Academy in Preston, Idaho and graduated in 1918. He then attended Utah State Agricultural College (USAC, modern Utah State University), where he first met his future wife, Flora Smith Amussen. Benson alternated quarters at USAC and worked on the family farm.

Benson served an LDS Church mission in Britain from 1921 to 1923. It was while serving as a missionary, particularly an experience in Sheffield, that Benson came to realize how central the Book of Mormon was to the message of the church and in converting people to it. Due to local antagonism and threats of violence, LDS Church leaders sent apostle David O. McKay to personally oversee the mission. McKay was impressed with Benson and appointed him as president of the Newcastle Conference.

After his mission, Benson studied at Brigham Young University and finished his bachelor's degree there in 1926. That year he married Flora Smith Amussen, shortly after her return from a mission in Hawaii. They had six children together. Benson received a master of science degree in agricultural economics in 1927 from Iowa State University. Several years later, he did preliminary work on a doctorate at the University of California at Berkeley, but never completed it.

Just after receiving his master's degree, Benson returned to Whitney to run the family farm. He later became the county agriculture extension agent for Oneida County, Idaho. He later was promoted to the supervisor of all county agents and moved to Boise in 1930. Benson encouraged crop rotation, improved grains, fertilizers, pest controls, and establishment of farmer's cooperatives to market farm commodities.

While in Boise, Benson also worked in the central state extension office connected with the University of Idaho Extension Service. He also founded a farmers cooperative. Benson was superintendent of the Boise Stake Young Men's Mutual Improvement Association and later a counselor in the stake presidency. Benson was a critic of national agricultural policies implemented in the 1930s under Franklin D. Roosevelt. In particular, he objected to farm subsidies, and efforts by the Agricultural Adjustment Administration to raise prices by paying farmers to destroy crops and kill livestock.

In 1939, he became president of the Boise Idaho Stake. Later that year, he moved to Washington, D.C., to become Executive Secretary of the National Council of Farmer Cooperatives, overseeing around five thousand farm cooperatives which represented two million farmers throughout the country.

Benson became the first president of a new church stake in Washington, D.C.

== Apostle ==
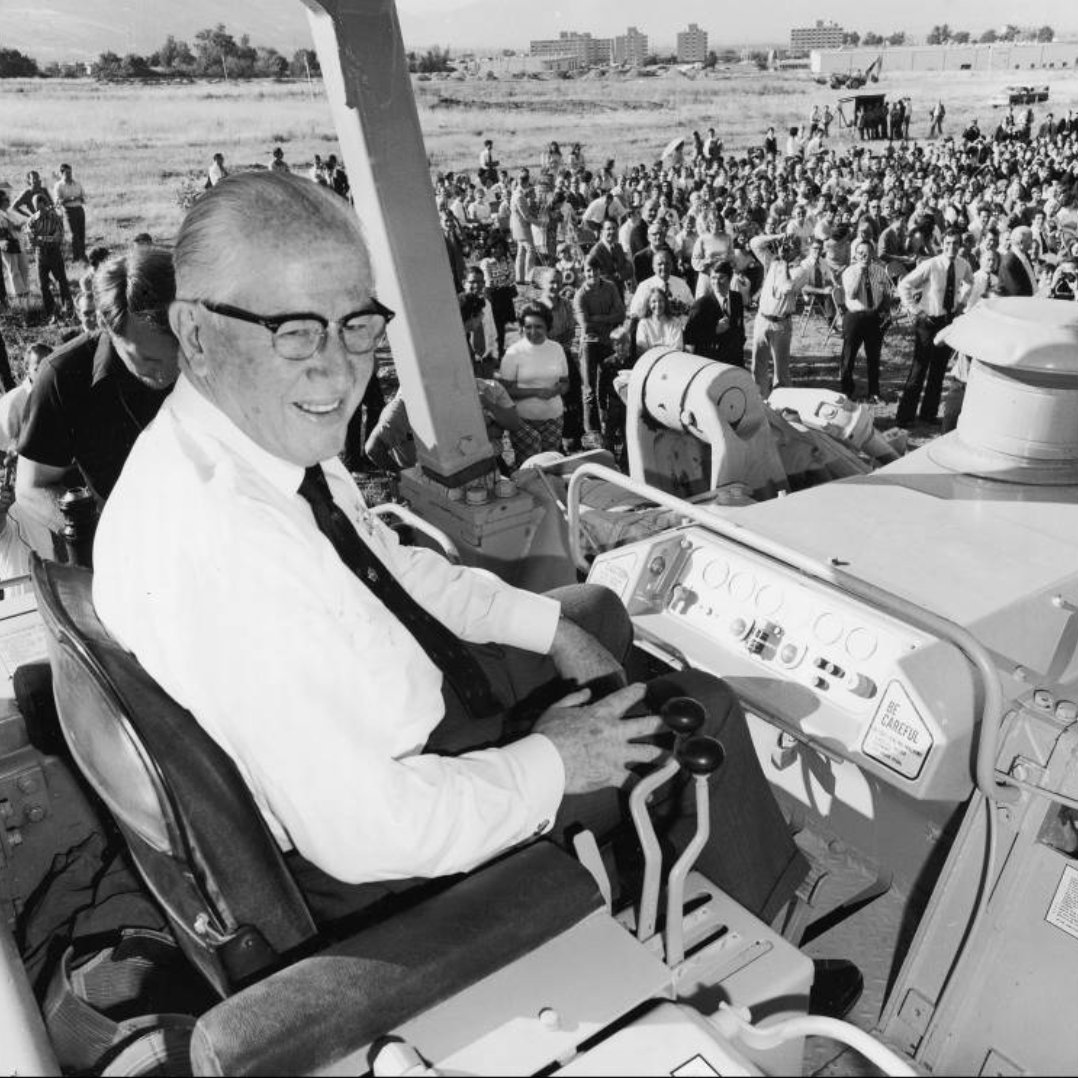
Benson breaking ground on the Language Training Mission on July 18, 1974

In 1943, Benson went to Salt Lake City to ask church leaders for advice on whether to accept a new job. They unexpectedly told him that he would join the church leadership. On October 7, 1943, both Benson and Spencer W. Kimball (1895–1985) became members of the church's Quorum of the Twelve Apostles, filling two vacancies created by the deaths of apostles that summer. Since Kimball was four years older than Benson, Kimball was ordained first and was given seniority over Benson in the Quorum. Benson became President of the Quorum in 1973 when Kimball became President of the Church.

In 1946, the First Presidency sent Benson to Europe to oversee the church's relief efforts after World War II. He spent eleven months there, traveling 61,000 miles and supervising two thousand tons of relief supplies, including to Germany and Poland. Recalling this experience, he wrote to his wife, "I'm so grateful you and the children can be spared the views of the terrible ravages of war. I fear I'll never be able to erase them from my memory." Apostle Gordon B. Hinckley noted of Benson's experience in Europe, "I am confident that it was out of what he saw of the bitter fruit of dictatorship that he developed his strong feelings, almost hatred, for communism and socialism."

On April 25, 1950, Benson was married vicariously to his never married and recently deceased cousin, Eva Amanda Benson, with his wife standing in as proxy.

On September 16, 1980, he dedicated the newly renamed Ezra Taft Benson Building at Ricks College.

Benson's teachings as an apostle were the 2015 course of study in the LDS Church's Sunday Relief Society and Melchizedek priesthood classes.

== Political career ==
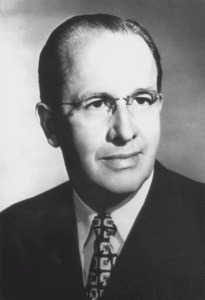
Benson while secretary of agriculture

In 1948, Republican presidential nominee Thomas E. Dewey approached Benson before the election that year about becoming the United States Secretary of Agriculture. Although Benson had supported his distant cousin Robert A. Taft over Dwight D. Eisenhower for the 1952 Republican nomination and did not know Eisenhower, after his election Eisenhower nevertheless appointed Benson as Secretary of Agriculture. Benson accepted with the permission and encouragement of church president David O. McKay; Benson therefore served simultaneously in the United States Cabinet and in the Quorum of the Twelve Apostles. He became the first clergy member to be a cabinet secretary since Edward Everett in 1852, which created some controversy as crossing a boundary between church and state. The American Council of Churches opposed Benson for being a member of what they felt was a "pagan religion...hostile to the Biblical evangelical Christian faith."

At the time of assuming office, the Department of Agriculture had 78,000 employees and an annual budget of $2.1 billion.

Benson opposed the system of government price supports and aid to farmers which he was entrusted by Eisenhower to administer, arguing that it amounted to unacceptable socialism. Furthermore, farming in the United States was increasingly becoming large scale agribusiness at the expense of the small farmer, and Benson was opposed to outsized portions of these government subsidies being apportioned to these large companies. He was once pelted with eggs by a group of South Dakota farmers over his efforts to reduce price controls. Another time, 21 congressmen from the Midwest stormed his office requesting he not lift price controls on hogs, which he refused to do, and later noted that the prices rose on their own. Nonetheless, he served in his cabinet position for all eight years of Eisenhower's presidency. He was selected as the administrator-designate of the Emergency Food Agency, part of a secret group that became known as the Eisenhower Ten. The group was created by Eisenhower in 1958 to serve in the event of a national emergency.

As Benson's term came to an end in 1961, farm commodity prices had risen 10% from the previous year, and Benson's popularity increased.

In 1968, the John Birch Society (JBS) made an effort to nominate Benson as a presidential candidate, with segregationist Senator Strom Thurmond as vice president, for which Benson sought and obtained approval from LDS Church president David O. McKay. Several months later, Benson flew to Alabama to meet with segregationist Alabama Governor George Wallace, who asked Benson to become his vice presidential running mate for the presidency. This time McKay refused Benson's request, even after Wallace himself wrote to McKay.

Benson's interest in politics could be seen in the subjects he chose for his biannual addresses at general conference. Three-quarters of Benson's 20 sermons at general conference during the 1960s were on a political theme. In addition, Benson gave hundreds of other talks discussing Communism and how to combat it.

Like Robert A. Taft, Benson supported a non-interventionist foreign policy.

In August 1989, Benson received the Presidential Citizens Medal from U.S. President George H. W. Bush.

Benson was a vocal proponent of limited government, individual liberty, and free-market economics. As Secretary of Agriculture, he implemented policies aimed at reducing government intervention in agriculture, including efforts to phase out price supports and promote self-reliance among farmers. A fierce critic of communism and socialism, Benson warned against the erosion of constitutional freedoms and centralized power, drawing heavily on his belief in the principles of the U.S. Constitution. He integrated these ideals into his religious teachings, frequently emphasizing personal responsibility, moral agency, and the dangers of government overreach.

== Anti-communism efforts ==
Benson was an outspoken opponent of communism and socialism, and a strong supporter, but not an official member, of the JBS, which he praised as "the most effective non-church organization in our fight against creeping socialism and Godless Communism." Benson requested permission of church president McKay to join the JBS and sit on its board, but the request was denied. Benson was a close friend with the JBS founder, Robert W. Welch Jr., exchanging dozens of letters, and many hours in person discussing politics. When Nikita Khrushchev came in September 1959 to the US, Benson opposed his visit. From the 1950s to the 1980s, his public support of anti-communism often put him at odds with other leaders of the LDS Church. In 1960, Benson made a proposition to Brigham Young University president Ernest L. Wilkinson that his son, Reed Benson, be used as a spy to "find out who the orthodox teachers were and report to his father." Wilkinson declined the offer, stating "neither Brother Lee nor I want espionage of that character." Later in the 1960s and 1970s, members and advocates of the Birch Society did conduct espionage at BYU.

In October 1961 general conference, Benson said, "No true Latter-day Saint and no true American can be a socialist or a communist or support programs leading in that direction." This, and similar statements by Benson in the December Church News led Hugh B. Brown, a politically liberal member of the church's First Presidency, to begin publicly and privately pushing back against Benson. In the April 1962 general conference, Brown said, "The degree of a man's aversion to communism may not always be measured by the noise he makes in going about and calling everyone a communist who disagrees with his personal political bias. ... There is no excuse for members of this Church, especially men who hold the priesthood, to be opposing one another over communism."

In October 1962, Benson formally endorsed the JBS, as his son, Reed, accepted a leadership role in the society. Reed Benson had been using LDS Church meetinghouses for JBS meetings, a move that angered both Brown and first counselor Henry D. Moyle, who believed it violated the LDS Church's policy of political neutrality. Brown wrote in a letter shortly after the endorsement that he was "disgusted" and if Ezra Taft Benson continued his JBS activities that "some disciplinary action should be taken." In January 1963, the First Presidency issued a statement, "We deplore the presumption of some politicians, especially officers, coordinators and members of the John Birch Society, who undertake to align the Church or its leadership with their political views." Three days later, Benson spoke at a JBS-endorsed political rally, reported by several newspapers as purposefully ignoring the First Presidency statement, and embarrassing to the LDS Church. In February 1963, the JBS asked its members to "write to President McKay," with the suggested verbiage to praise "the great service Ezra Taft Benson and his son, Reed (our Utah Coordinator), are rendering to this battle, with the hope that they will be encouraged to continue." That same month, Benson gave a copy of his book, The Red Carpet: A Forthright Evaluation of the Rising Tide of Socialism – the Royal Road to Communism, to newly called apostle N. Eldon Tanner, who was a Democrat, and had been a Canadian politician in the Alberta Social Credit Party.

In 1963, the First Presidency sent Benson to Europe to preside over the missionary work there. Some, including the New York Times, interpreted this move as an "exile" after Benson's virtual endorsement of the JBS in general conference. McKay publicly denied that the assignment was an exile or a rebuke, but other church leaders, including Joseph Fielding Smith, indicated that a purpose in sending Benson to Europe was to break his ties with the JBS.

Benson published a 1966 pamphlet entitled "Civil Rights, Tool of Communist Deception". In a similar vein, during a 1972 general conference, Benson recommended that all church members read Gary Allen's New World Order tract "None Dare Call It a Conspiracy". U.S. Representative Ralph R. Harding, during a speech in Congress, accused Benson of being "a spokesperson for the radical right" and using his apostleship to give the impression that the church "approve[d] of" the JBS. Eisenhower endorsed Harding's criticism of Benson.

=== Civil rights movement ===
Benson viewed the civil rights movement as having been infiltrated with communists, who were using the movement to steer the United States towards communist policies. In his October 1967 conference address, Benson summed up his oft-repeated views,

"Now there is nothing wrong with civil rights; it is what's being done in the name of civil rights that is alarming. There is no doubt the so-called civil rights movement as it exists today is used as a Communist program for revolution in America just as agrarian reform was used by the Communists to take over China and Cuba."

In 1967, Benson asked McKay for permission to speak on "how the Communists are using the Negros to ... foment trouble in the United States". While McKay allowed Benson to speak on this subject, other church apostles were opposed to Benson's positions. (McKay did occasionally take action to limit Benson's use of the church to promote the JBS, such as when he deleted a couple of paragraphs from Benson's 1965 conference address after a complaint from Brown.) When Joseph Fielding Smith became church president in 1970, Benson was no longer given permission to promote his political opinions.

Also in 1967, Benson gave a talk discussing his views on the civil rights movement at the anti-Communist/segregationist leadership school of Billy James Hargis, who published it in his Christian Crusade magazine. Benson approved this talk to be used as the foreword to the book The Black Hammer: A Study of Black Power, Red Influence and White Alternatives, which the Southern Poverty Law Center has classified as "racist". This book features a decapitated and bleeding African-American head, being used at the end of a hammer in the Communist hammer and sickle, illustrating the book's theme that the civil rights movement was being used as a tool by communists. Historian D. Michael Quinn speculates that the endorsement of this book by Benson may have been an attempt to curry favor with segregationist George Wallace, who several months later asked Benson to be his vice presidential running mate for his 1968 campaign.

== Church presidency ==
Benson succeeded Kimball as President of the Quorum of the Twelve Apostles in 1973, and as church president in 1985. Benson retained Gordon B. Hinckley, who had been Kimball's second counselor, as his first counselor and chose Thomas S. Monson as his second counselor. Despite speculation, Benson did not discuss politics during his tenure as president, and instead focused on spiritual messages. During his early years as church president, Benson brought a renewed emphasis to the distribution and reading of the Book of Mormon, reaffirming this LDS scripture's importance as "the keystone of [the LDS] religion." After his challenge to the membership to "flood the earth with the Book of Mormon", the church sold a record six million copies that year to its membership for distribution. He is also remembered for a general conference sermon condemning pride, which relied heavily upon C. S. Lewis's Mere Christianity. In the priesthood session of the church's April 1988 General Conference, Benson specifically addressed the single adult men of the church, encouraging them to examine their direction in life and align themselves with the priorities of Christian discipleship, including marriage and family responsibilities.

=== Scouting ===
Benson was a lifelong supporter of Scouting. He started in 1918 as assistant Scoutmaster. On May 23, 1949, he was elected a member of the National Executive Board of the Boy Scouts of America. He received the three highest national awards in the Boy Scouts of America – the Silver Beaver, the Silver Antelope, and the Silver Buffalo – as well as world Scouting's international award, the Bronze Wolf.

== Health problems and death ==
Benson suffered poor health in the last years of his life due to blood clots in the brain. By the time he became president of the church, he was suffering some effects incident with old age, including dizzy spells, memory loss, and difficulty in public speaking.

In late 1987 he suffered a minor heart attack, and in late 1988, shortly after what would be the last church general conference where he would speak, he suffered a stroke which limited his ability to communicate. Starting around May 1989, Benson's capacity to conduct administrative and other business was severely diminished by illness and age, and his two counselors, Hinckley and Monson, took over the church administrative duties. Around this time, Benson's grandson, Steve Benson, accused church leaders of hiding the extent of Benson's senility and deterioration. Benson was hospitalized in 1993 with pneumonia.

Benson died on May 30, 1994, of congestive heart failure in his Salt Lake City apartment, at age 94. Funeral services were held June 4, 1994, in the Salt Lake Tabernacle and were conducted by Hinckley. Benson was buried near his birthplace in Whitney, Idaho, at the Whitney City Cemetery. Following Benson's funeral, Howard W. Hunter succeeded him as church president.

== Published works ==
- Reed A. Benson., ed. (1960). So Shall Ye Reap: Selected Addresses of Ezra Taft Benson. Deseret Book Company. ASIN B0007E7BME.
- The Red Carpet. Bookcraft. 1962. ASIN B0007F4WJI.
- Title of Liberty. compiled by Mark A. Benson. Deseret Book. 1964.
- Wes Andrews and Clyde Dalton (1967). The Black Hammer: A Study of Black Power, Red Influence and White Alternatives. Foreword by Ezra Taft Benson.
- An Enemy Hath Done This. Bookcraft. 1969. ISBN 0-88494-184-1.
- Civil Rights, Tool of Communist Deception. Deseret Book. 1969. ASIN B0007FRU42.
- God, Family, Country: Our Three Great Loyalties. Deseret Book. 1974. ASIN B0006CF3MC.
- Cross Fire: The Eight Years With Eisenhower. Doubleday. 1976. ISBN 0-8371-8422-3.
- This Nation Shall Endure. Deseret Book. 1977. ISBN 0-87747-658-6.
- Come Unto Christ. Deseret Book. 1983. ISBN 0-87747-997-6.
- The Constitution: A Heavenly Banner. Deseret Book. 1986. ISBN 0-87579-216-2.
- The Teachings of Ezra Taft Benson. Bookcraft. 1988. ISBN 0-88494-639-8.
- A Witness and a Warning: A Modern-Day Prophet Testifies of the Book of Mormon. Deseret Book. 1988. ISBN 0-87579-153-0.
- Ezra Taft Benson Remembers The Joys of Christmas. Deseret Book. 1988. ASIN B00072PW5E.
- A Labor of Love: The 1946 European Mission of Ezra Taft Benson. Deseret Book. 1989. ISBN 0-87579-275-8.
- Come, Listen to a Prophet's Voice. Deseret Book. 1990. ISBN 0-87579-351-7.
- Missionaries to Match Our Message. Bookcraft. 1990. ISBN 0-88494-779-3.
- Elect Women of God. Bookcraft. 1992. ISBN 0-88494-838-2.
- Sermons and Writings of President Ezra Taft Benson. The Church of Jesus Christ of Latter-day Saints. 2003.
- Teachings of Presidents of the Church: Ezra Taft Benson. The Church of Jesus Christ of Latter-day Saints. 2014.

== Posthumous honors ==
- Idaho Hall of Fame, inducted 1997
- Ezra Taft Benson Building at Brigham Young University, dedicated by Gordon B. Hinckley in 1995.

== See also ==
- Michael T. Benson (grandson and educational administrator)
- Steve Benson (grandson and Pulitzer Prize-winning cartoonist)
- Mark B. Madsen (grandson and Utah state senator)

== Notes ==
The Church of Jesus Christ of Latter-day Saints titles
Preceded by Spencer W. Kimball	President of the Church; November 10, 1985 – May 30, 1994	Succeeded by Howard W. Hunter
Preceded by Spencer W. Kimball	President of the Quorum of the Twelve Apostles; December 30, 1973 – November 10, 1985	Succeeded by Marion G. Romney
Preceded by Spencer W. Kimball	Quorum of the Twelve Apostles; October 7, 1943 – November 10, 1985	Succeeded by Mark E. Petersen
Political offices
Preceded by Charles F. Brannan	U.S. Secretary of Agriculture; Served under: Dwight D. Eisenhower; 1953–1961	Succeeded by Orville Freeman
