= Aurelia Spencer Rogers =

Aurelia Read Spencer Rogers (October 4, 1834 – August 19, 1922) was the founder of Primary, the children's organization and official auxiliary of the Church of Jesus Christ of Latter-day Saints. Rogers was also a women's rights activist and suffragette.

== Early life ==
Aurelia Read Spencer was born at Deep River, Middlesex County, Connecticut, the eldest child of Orson Spencer and Catherine Cannon Curtis. When Aurelia was 12 years old, her mother died at Sugar Creek, Iowa. A few months later, her father was asked by Brigham Young to become the new mission president for the church in Europe. As the second eldest child, Aurelia and her elder sister were made responsible for assisting the other four siblings in the move to the Salt Lake Valley, which the Spencer children completed in 1848. Orson Spencer returned from Europe in September 1849 and joined the family in Salt Lake City.

== Marriage and family ==
On March 27, 1851, Aurelia married Thomas Rogers in Salt Lake City. The Rogers moved to Farmington, Utah Territory, where Rogers would raise seven children.

== Founding the Primary Association ==
In 1878, Rogers had become concerned that younger Latter-day Saint children had too much unsupervised time. In particular, Rogers felt that the younger boys in the community were becoming unruly and mischievous. While praying for guidance, Rogers said she heard a voice say "that there was an auxiliary organization [in the church] for all ages except the children".

Rogers met with the LDS Church president John Taylor and received permission to operate a church organization for children. With the assistance of general Relief Society president Eliza R. Snow, Rogers organized a Primary Association for her local Farmington ward on August 11, 1878. Two weeks later, the first meeting was held on August 25, with 115 children in attendance. That day, boys were specifically taught not to steal fruit from orchards and girls were taught not to hang on wagons. In addition, they were given lessons on faith, manners, obedience, and other principles.

Snow assisted the church in spreading Primary to other church congregations. In 1880, Primary was adopted churchwide as the official organization for children in the LDS Church. From 1893 until her death, Rogers served on the general board of the Primary organization.

== Suffragette ==
Rogers was a delegate to the Woman's Suffrage Convention in Georgia in 1895. That same year, she was a delegate to the meeting of Susan B. Anthony's National Council of Women in Washington, D.C.

== Death ==
Rogers died in Farmington, Utah at the age of 87.

== See also ==
- Richard Ballantyne
- William R. Smith (Mormon)
