= Bowman–Chamberlain House =

Historic house in Utah, United States

- U.S. National Register of Historic Places
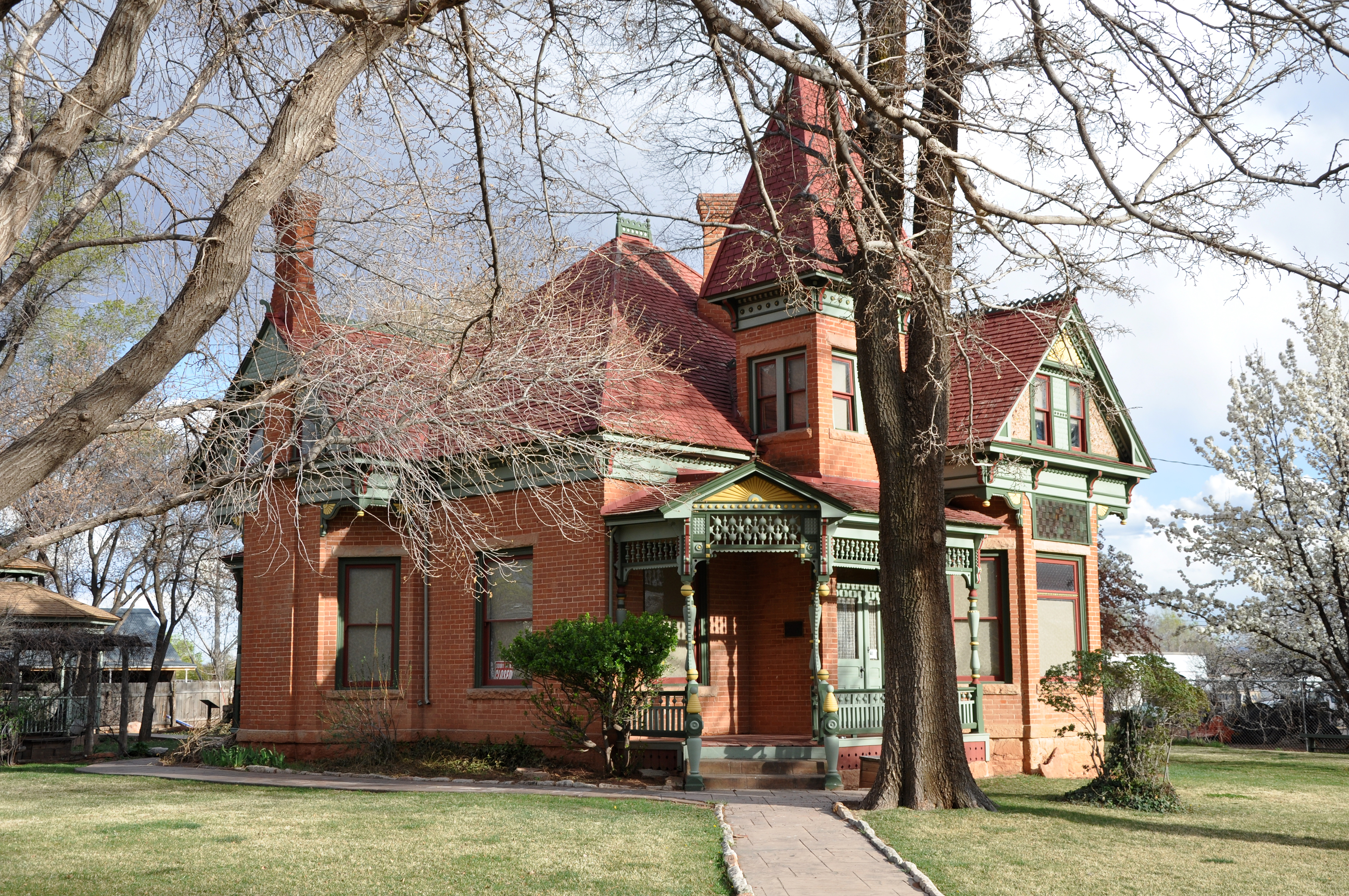
- Bowman–Chamberlain House in 2013

- Location within Utah Location within the United States
- Location: 14 E. 100 South, Kanab, Utah
- Coordinates: 37°2′47″N 112°31′37″W
- Area: less than one acre
- Built: 1893
- Architectural style: Queen Anne
- NRHP reference No.: 75001811
- Added to NRHP: July 8, 1975

The Bowman–Chamberlain House, also known as the Kanab Heritage House Museum, was built in 1894, in Kanab, Utah. It was listed on the U.S. National Register of Historic Places in 1975.

It was designed by Reuben Broadbent.

NRHP nom and accompanying photos
