= Reuben Broadbent =

American architect

Reuben Broadbent (December 23, 1817 in Kexby, Lincolnshire, England – May 20, 1909) was a pioneer architect in Utah and a member of the Church of Jesus Christ of Latter-day Saints (LDS Church).

== History ==
Raised Episcopalian, he learned carpentry from his father. After converting to the LDS Church in 1849, he emigrated to America with his wife Harriet Otter on the 1851 ship Ellen. He lived in St. Louis, Missouri for some time before settling in Farmington, Utah.

Among his works are the Farmington Rock Chapel and the Bowman-Chamberlain House which are listed on the U.S. National Register of Historic Places.

== See also ==
- Reuben Broadbent at Findagrave.com
