= Richard Ballantyne =

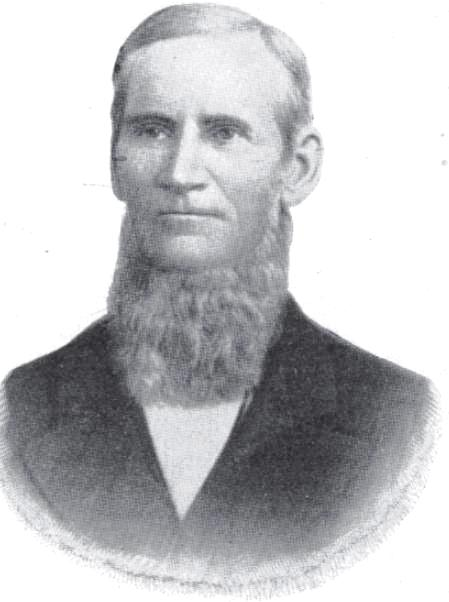

Personal details
- Born: August 26, 1817; Whitridgebog, Roxburghshire, Scotland
- Died: November 8, 1898 (aged 81); Ogden, Utah, United States
- Resting place: Ogden City Cemetery; 41.2325°N 111.9622°W
- Organization: Founder of the LDS Sunday School
- Spouse(s): Mary Pierce; Caroline A. Sanderson; Huldah M. Clark
- Children: 23
- Parents: David Ballantyne; Ann Bannerman

Richard Ballantyne (August 26, 1817 – November 8, 1898) was the founder of the Sunday School of the Church of Jesus Christ of Latter-day Saints, having begun the program in December 1849. He was also a Mormon pioneer and missionary.

Ballantyne was born in Whitridgebog, Roxburghshire, Scotland, where he was a Sunday school teacher in the Relief Presbyterian Church. In December 1842, Ballantyne became a member of the Church of Jesus Christ of Latter Day Saints, being baptized in the Firth of Forth at Leith. In 1843 he and a number of his family members emigrated to Nauvoo, Illinois, where the majority of the Latter Day Saints were gathering. On February 17, 1847, Ballantyne married Hulda Meriah Clark, and they emigrated to Utah Territory in 1848 with the Mormon pioneers.

While living in Salt Lake City, Ballantyne asked for permission from his bishop to establish a Sunday school for some of the Latter-day Saint children. Having been granted permission, he held the first Church Sunday School meeting in his home on December 9, 1849. Approximately 30 students were in attendance, among them the younger children of George and Ann Quayle Cannon (including Angus M. Cannon), a daughter of John Van Cott, and children of other prominent families. Other congregations soon followed this model, and the Sunday School was organized church-wide in 1867.

In 1852, Ballantyne was called to serve a church mission to India. He worked there with little success from 1853 to 1855.

Like many early Latter-day Saints, Ballantyne practiced plural marriage. He married Huldah M. Clark in 1847, Mary Pierce in 1855, and Caroline Sanderson in 1857 He was the father of 23 children. His sister Jane was a plural wife of John Taylor, who was president of the Church from 1880 to 1887.

== See also ==
- Aurelia Spencer Rogers
- Hugh Findlay
