= Farmington Rock Chapel =

Historic church in Utah, United States

Coordinates: 40.9848°N 111.8871°W

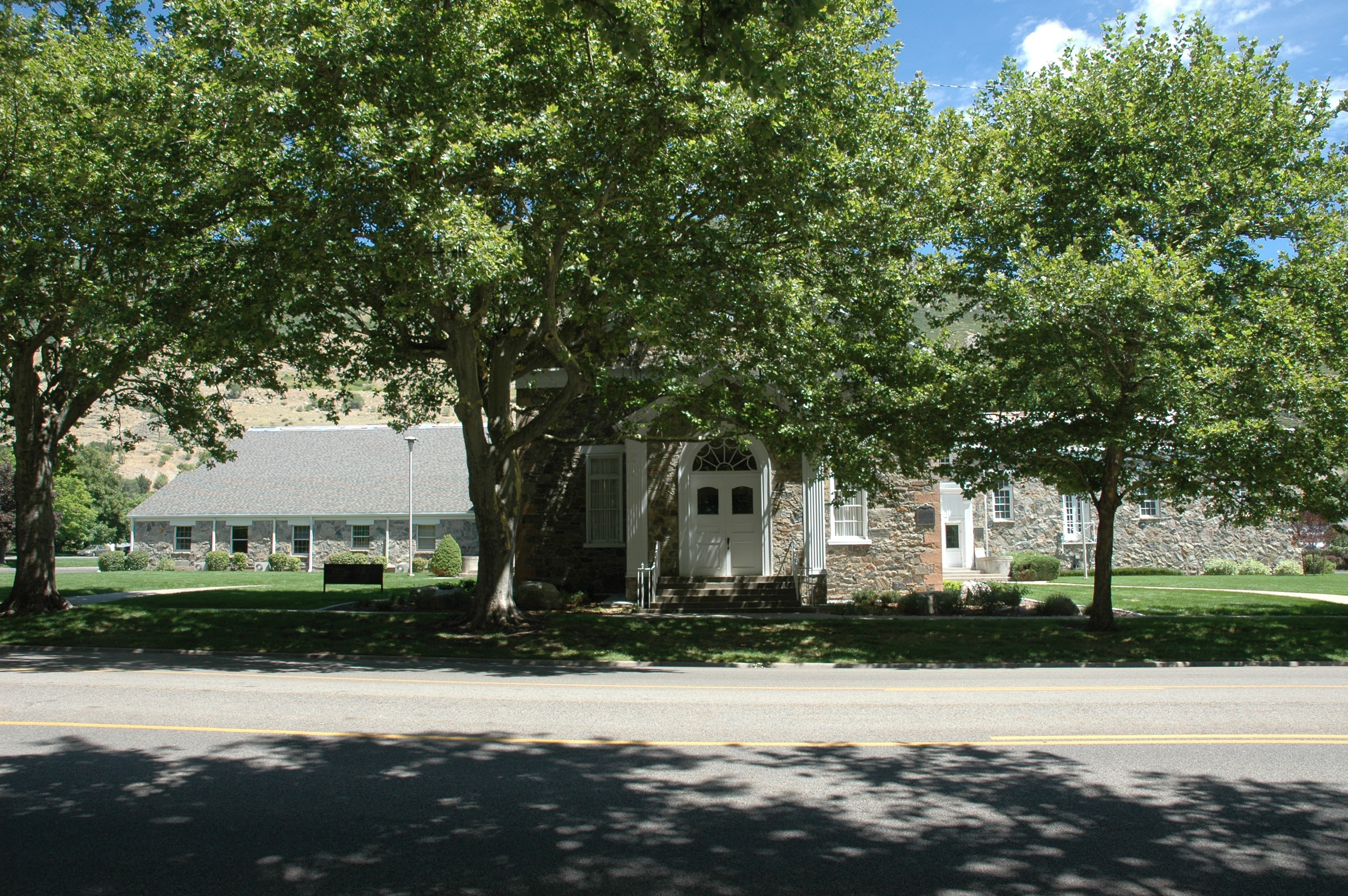
Front (west) entrance

The Farmington Rock Chapel or Rock Church, built between 1861 and 1863 in the city of Farmington, Utah, is one of the oldest churches still in use in Utah. The Primary Association of the Church of Jesus Christ of Latter-day Saints (LDS Church) was founded by Aurelia Spencer Rogers in the rock church in 1878 with 224 children and now serves millions of children worldwide, adding additional historic significance. A large mural painted by Lynn Fausett commemorating the 63rd anniversary of the Primary was added to the LDS Church in 1941. The church was designed by pioneer architect Reuben Broadbent and built with native fieldstone with slight Greek Revival styling but is mainly vernacular. The rock chapel has had three additional wings added onto it with renovations happening in 1941 and 1980, and currently serves the Farmington 1st, 3rd, and 5th Wards. The rock church is part of the Farmington Main Street Historic District which was added to the U.S. National Register of Historic Places on October 20, 2011.

== See also ==
- Photo of exterior of Farmington Rock Chapel
- Photo of interior of the Farmington Rock Chapel and mural
- National Register of Historic Places listings in Davis County, Utah
