= The Black Hammer =

1967 book by Wes Andrews and Clyde Dalton

The Black Hammer: A Study of Black Power, Red Influence and White Alternatives
- Author: Wes Andrews and Clyde Dalton
- Language: English
- Genre: Political
- Publisher: Desco
- Publication date: 1967
- Publication place: United States
- Pages: 101

The Black Hammer: A Study of Black Power, Red Influence and White Alternatives is a 1967 book by Wes Andrews and Clyde Dalton. It is notable for being endorsed by Ezra Taft Benson, the former Secretary of Agriculture in the Eisenhower Administration and an apostle and later president of the Church of Jesus Christ of Latter-day Saints. Benson also wrote the book's foreword.

== Thesis ==
The book was written in response to what the authors perceived as a communist takeover of the civil rights movement. The book cover features a decapitated and bleeding African-American head, being used at the end of a hammer in the communist hammer and sickle, illustrating the book's theme that the civil rights movement was being used as a tool by communists.

== Foreword ==
In 1967 Benson gave a talk discussing his views on the civil rights movement at the anti-Communist/segregationist leadership school of Billy James Hargis, who published it in his Christian Crusade magazine. Benson approved this talk to be used as the foreword to the book. Historian D. Michael Quinn notes that Benson's endorsement of the book came at the time when the John Birch Society was making efforts to nominate Benson for U.S. president, with segregationist Strom Thurmond as his running mate. Quinn also speculates that the endorsement of this book by Benson may have been an attempt to curry favor with segregationist George Wallace, who did ask Benson to be his vice-presidential running mate for his 1968 campaign.

== Summary ==
The book is dismissive of the civil rights legislation, warning that the organized efforts for civil rights were "part of the 100 year old Communist program for the enslavement of America," and that there existed "well-defined plans for the establishment of a Negro Soviet dictatorship in the South."

The book sarcastically criticized the legislation as reducing black self-reliance and fed into "the Negro's need for complete subservience to the Great White Fathers in Washington."

The book portrays African-Americans as victims rather than perpetrators of the communist plot, stating that they are "ready and willing to take any Negro by the hand and help him into an era of self-proprietorship that every deserving American can achieve."

== Reception ==
The Southern Poverty Law Center has labeled the book as "vicious and racist".
