= Lynn Fausett =

American painter

Lynn Fausett February 27, 1894 – August 27, 1977) was an American painter. He attended and later became president of the Art Students League in New York City. He painted murals in the Nebraska State Capitol and St. Bartholomew's Church. Fausett is also the muralist of The First Meeting of the Primary Association depicting the establishment of the Primary Association in the Farmington Rock Chapel for the Church of Jesus Christ of Latter-day Saints (LDS Church).

== Early life ==
Lynn Fausett was born on February 27, 1894, in Price, Utah Territory, to George A. Fausett and Helen Josephine Bryner. He was the oldest of their eight children. He attended public schools in Carbon County, Utah. Fausett began painting at a young age. He painted set designs for theater shows and entered his art in county fairs and art shows. Fausett lived in Price until he finished 10th grade. He then began studying at Brigham Young High School in 1910. Two years later he graduated with a diploma in art and manual training. He went back to school for another year and graduated from Carbon County High School in 1913 having studied geology and mathematics. While in school, he was involved in football and the school newspaper. He also played the clarinet. Fausett's brother, Dean, was also a painter.

He married Helen Elizabeth Wessells on September 15, 1925. She, too, was an artist. However, the couple later divorced. He married Fiametta Rhead on September 7, 1940.

== Career ==
After graduating high school, Fausett taught in Hiawatha, Utah. He attended the University of Utah from 1913 to 1914, studying mining engineering. Fausett enlisted in the United States Navy during World War I from 1916 to 1920. Fausett was the recipient of the Meritorious Service Award during World War II to honor his work as an art director.

In 1922, he went to New York City to study at the Art Students League. He specialized in murals. Fausett remained in New York for 16 years to work his art. To support himself, he worked in a mural studio and the night shift at the New York Bus Company. In 1932, he was named the president of the Art Students League. During his administration, board members could only serve for three years; this limitation is still in practice today. While he was in New York, Fausett also traveled to Germany and Italy to study mosaics, and to France to learn from fresco paintings. In his own painting, he used gouache and tempera mixed with oil paints.

In 1938, Fausett returned to Price. That same year, he was in Who's Who in New York, and he later was included in the Who's Who in America in 1940. After 1942, Fausset painted historical subjects and depicted landscapes of life on the ranch, cattle drives, and Utah canyons. He became well known for his western landscapes. He worked on murals for buildings including the Nebraska State Capitol and St. Bartholomew's Church. He also worked on murals that were sponsored by the Works Progress Administration, and for the City Hall in Price. Eddington painted a mural depicting the establishment of the Primary.

In 1941, Fausett painted a mural, The First Meeting of the Primary Association depicting the establishment of the Primary Association in the Farmington Rock Chapel for the LDS Church. The piece was commissioned by May Green Hinckley. He also produced murals for the This Is the Place Heritage Park.

Fausett died August 27, 1977, in Salt Lake City. He is buried in Price.
