= Farmington Main Street Historic District =

Historic district in Utah, United States

- U.S. National Register of Historic Places
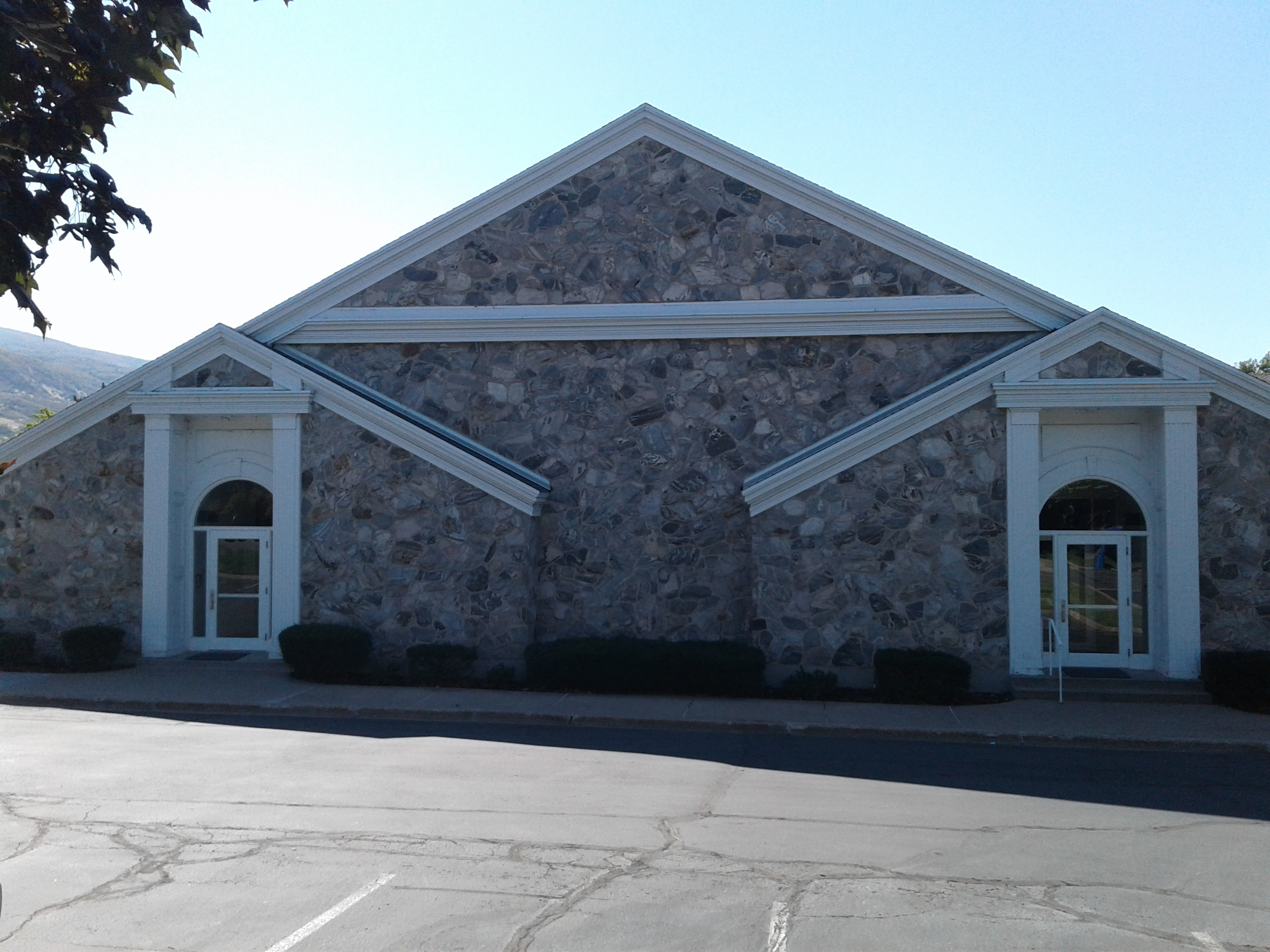
- Farmington Rock Chapel

- Location within Utah
- Location: Approx. Main St. from 200 S.to 600 N., along 600 North St. to Park Ln. and 100 North St. from Main St to 100 W., Farmington, Utah
- Coordinates: 40°58′50″N 111°53′15″W
- Area: 75 acres (30 ha)
- Built: 1853
- Built by: Allen, William; et al.
- Architectural style: Late 19th and 20th Century Revivals, Late 19th and Early 20th Century American Movements
- NRHP reference No.: 11000756
- Added to NRHP: October 20, 2011

The Farmington Main Street Historic District, in Farmington, Utah, is a historic district mostly along Main Street which was listed on the National Register of Historic Places in 2011. It included 66 contributing buildings.

The district includes Farmington's city offices at 160 S. Main Street, which distributes a self-guided tour of sites in the district.

The district may also have been known as the Farmington Sycamore Historic District, or is otherwise associated with that. It runs along Main St. from 200 S.to 600 N., along 600 North St. to Park Ln. and 100 North St. from Main St to 100 W.

Architecture: Late 19th and 20th Century Revivals architecture, Late 19th and Early 20th Century American Movements architecture

Historic function: Domestic; Religion; Commerce/trade; Government

Historic subfunction: Single Dwelling; Religious Structure; Department Store; City Hall; Hotel; Specialty Store; Courthouse

Criteria: event, architecture/engineering

Approximately Main St. from 200 South to 600 North, along 600 North to Park Lane and 100 North from Main St to 100 West
