= Oneida Stake Academy =

- U.S. National Register of Historic Places
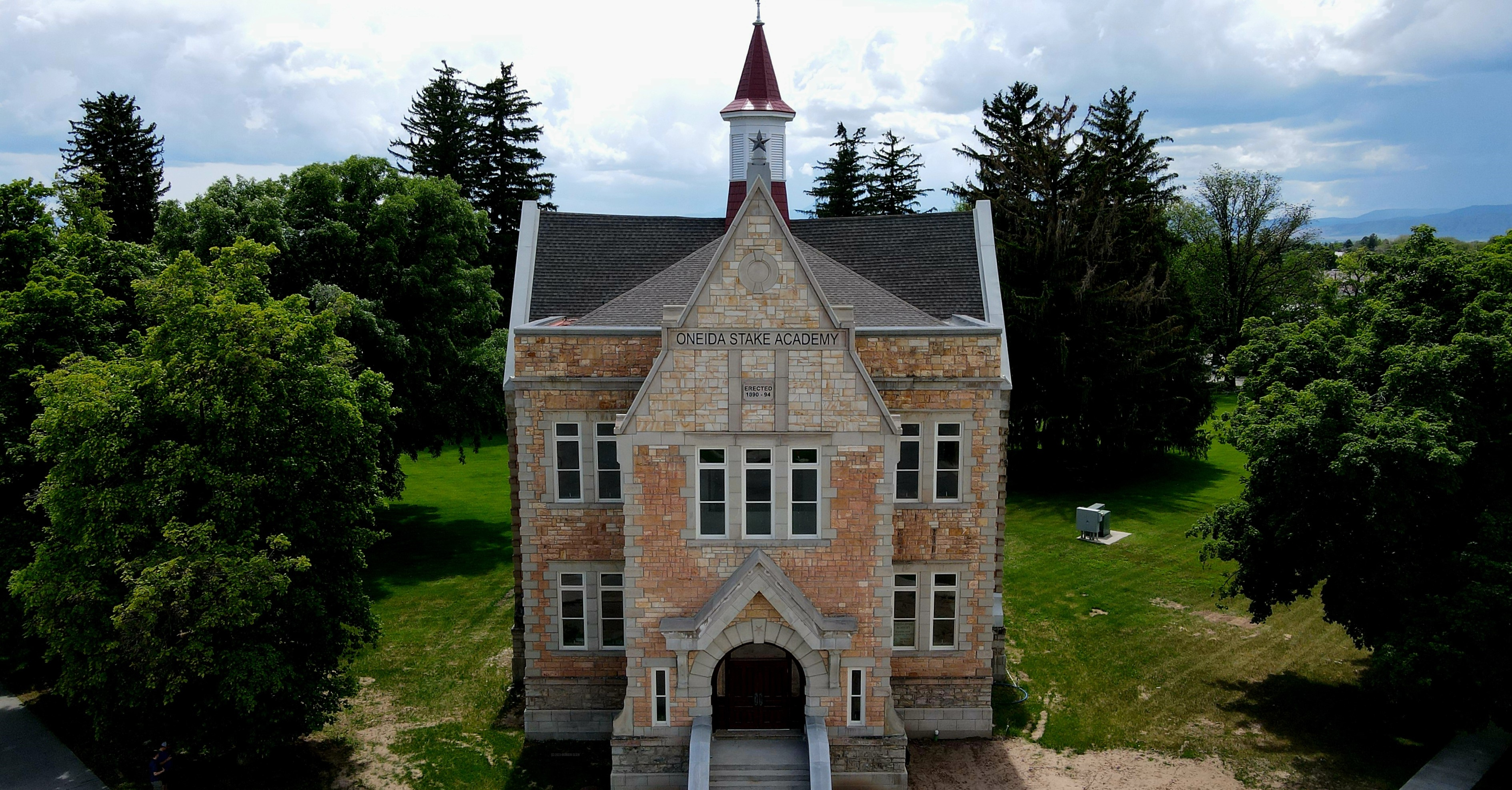
- The building at its new location in 2023

- Location within Idaho Location within the United States
- Location: 90 E. Oneida St., Preston, Idaho
- Coordinates: 42°05′46″N 111°52′28″W
- Area: less than one acre
- Built: 1890–1895
- Architect: Joseph Don Carlos Young
- Architectural style: Romanesque Revival
- Restored by: Oneida Stake Academy Foundation
- Website: oneidastakeacademy.org
- NRHP reference No.: 75000630
- Added to NRHP: May 21, 1975

The Oneida Stake Academy was a secondary school operated by the Oneida Stake of the Church of Jesus Christ of Latter-day Saints (LDS Church) from 1888 to 1922. The academy building was constructed in Preston, Idaho, in 1895, after the stake headquarters moved from Franklin, Idaho, in 1889.

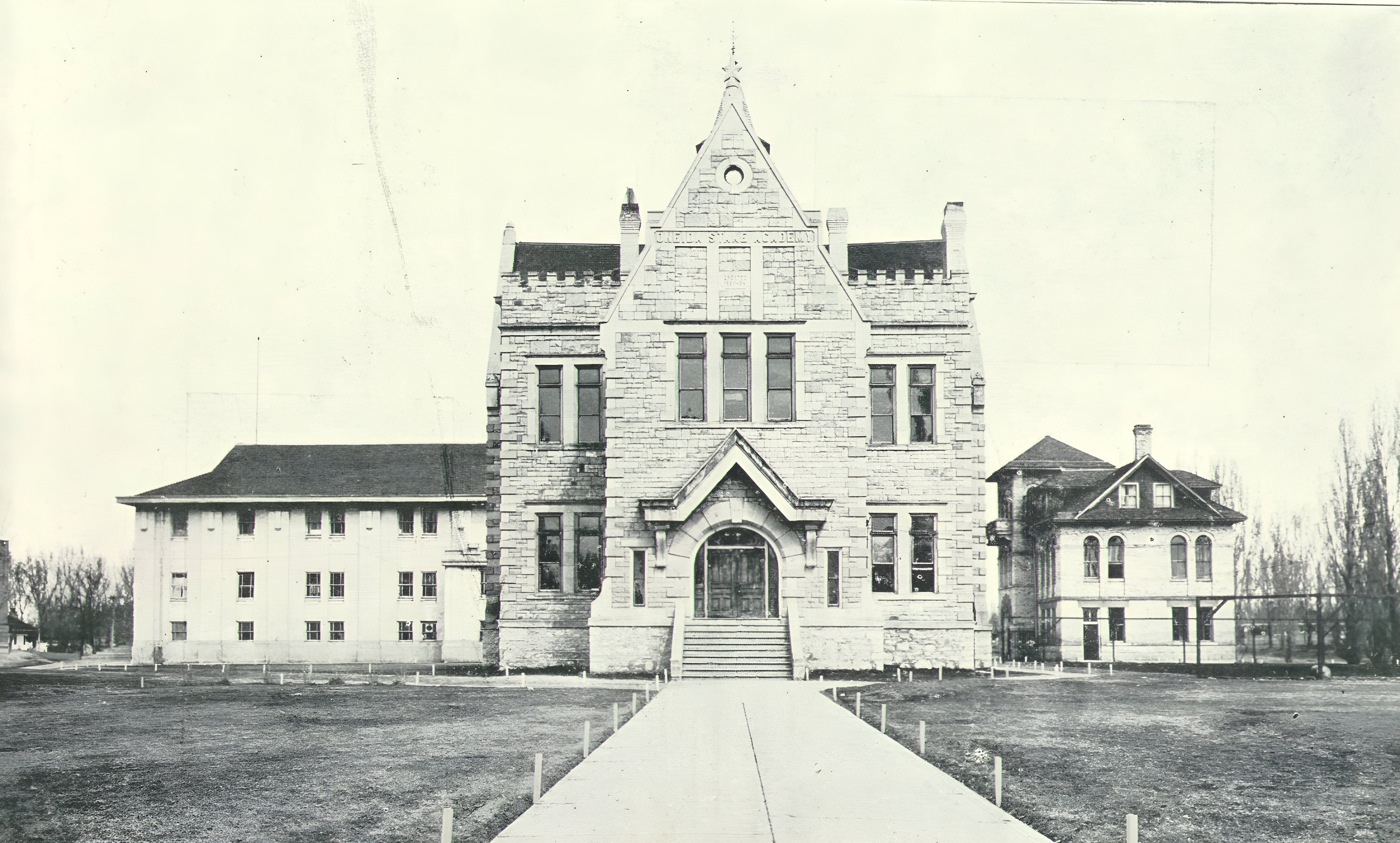
The Oneida Stake Academy as Preston High School in 1924. Behind the Academy are the former Nielson Gymnasium and Manual Arts Building.

Among its alumni were Ezra Taft Benson and Harold B. Lee, both of whom later served as church presidents. Medal of Honor recipients Mervyn S. Bennion, Leonard Brostrom, and Junior Van Noy also attended the school.

Following the emergence of the church's seminary program and better-equipped public schools, the LDS Church decided to close its system of secondary academies. In 1922, the Oneida Stake Academy was dissolved, although the public school system continued to use the building until 1990.

== Moving the Academy ==
In 2003, the building was moved using funds raised by the Mormon Historic Sites Foundation and the Friends of the Academy (Oneida Stake Academy Foundation) to a new site called Benson Park that had been donated by the LDS Church.

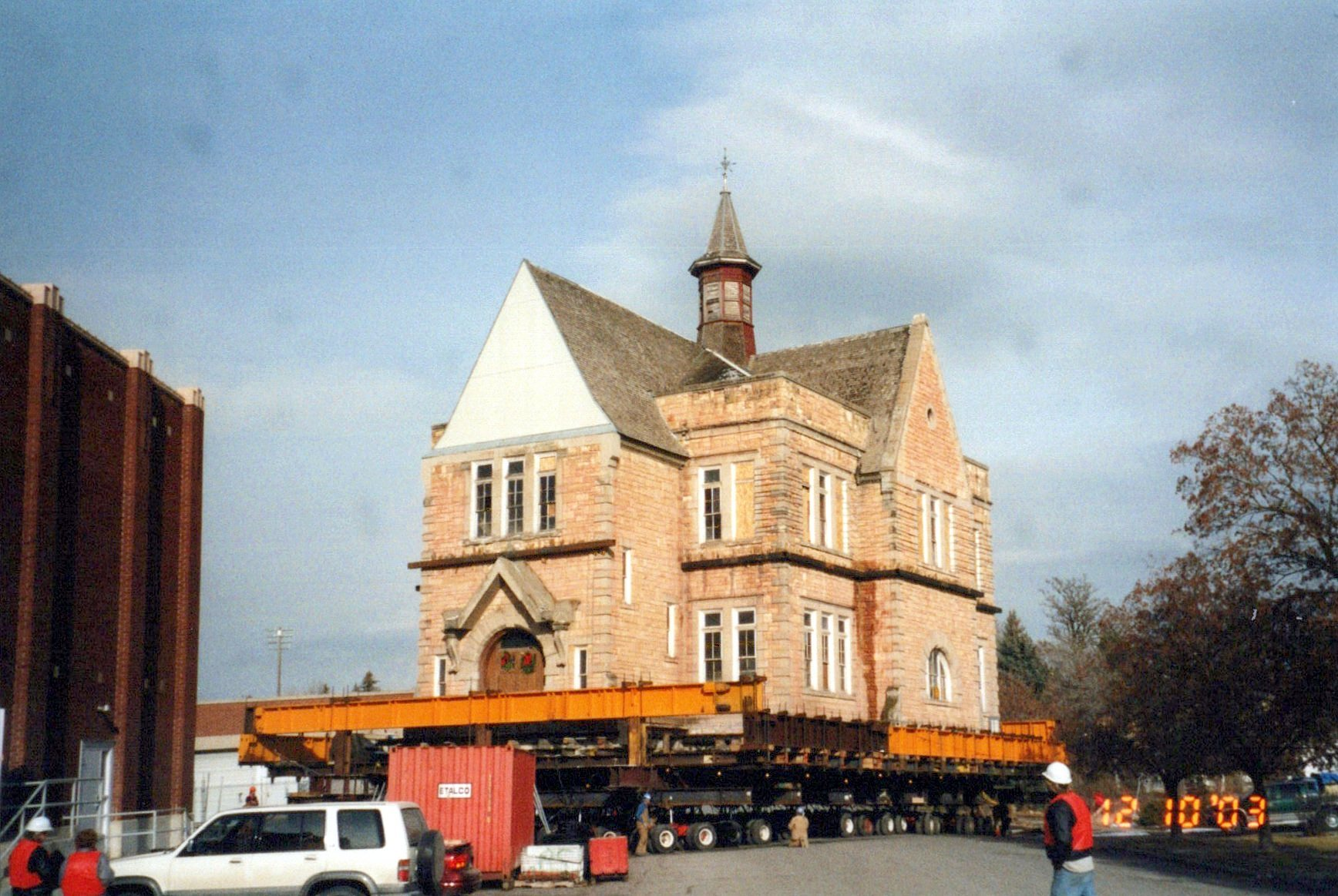
Oneida Stake Academy move. 2003

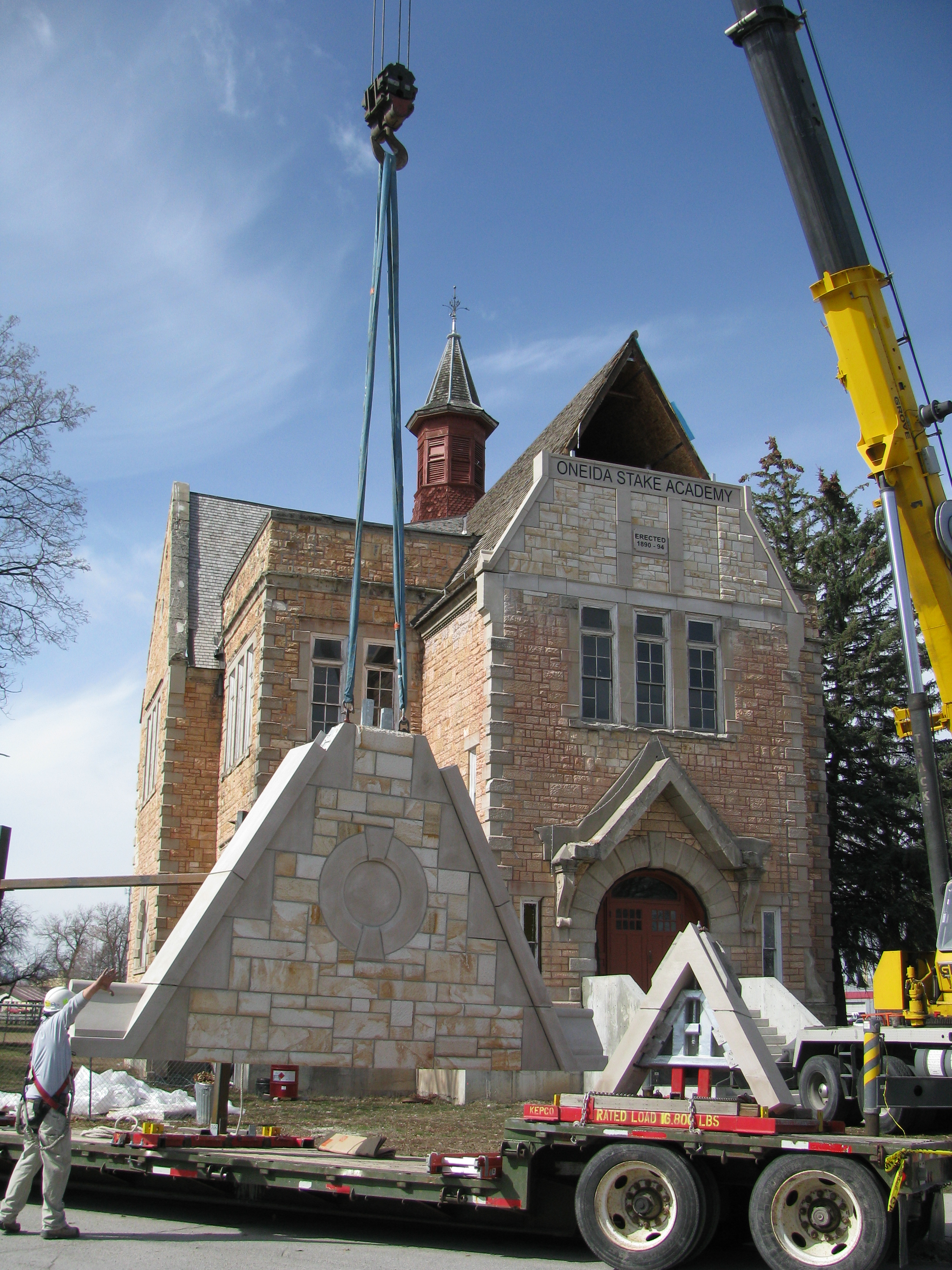
The Oneida Stake Academy's front gable being restored.

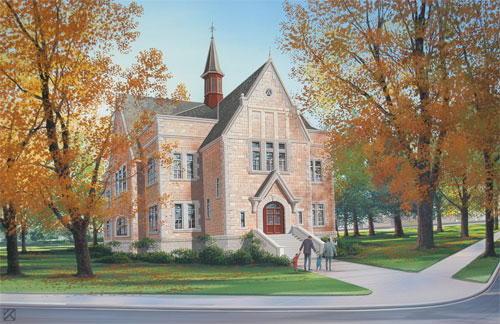
Oneida Stake Academy rendering

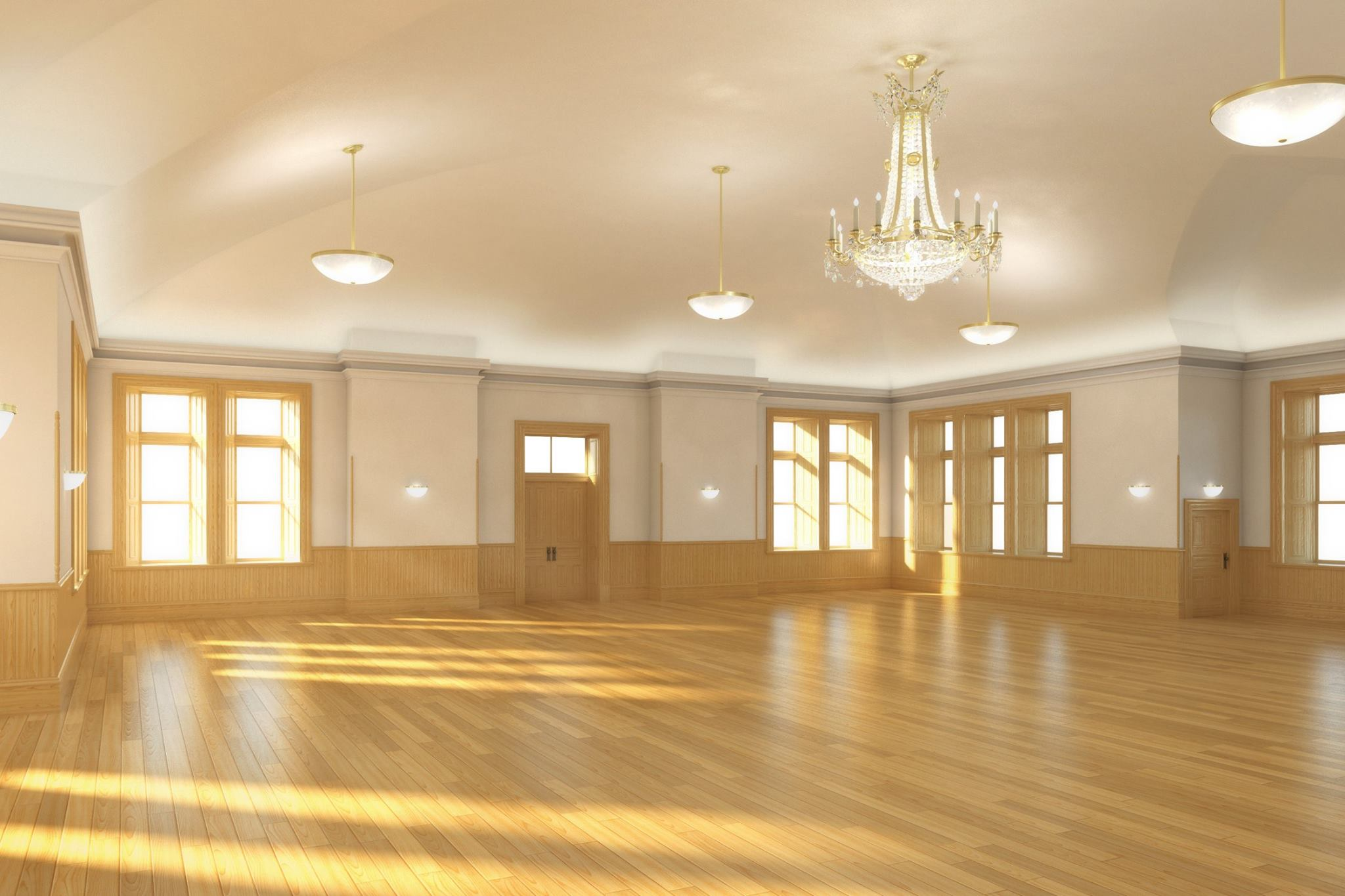
Oneida Stake Academy Ballroom rendering

== Restoration and future use ==
Restoration on the building has been on-going and includes structural reinforcement, masonry repairs, windows, and mechanical systems.

Future plans for the building include providing a museum/interpretive center, a historical classroom, and a large meeting room. The top floor ballroom is expected to be used for a variety of community events or gatherings.
