= Kent Neighborhood Historic District =

Historic district in Vermont, United States

- U.S. National Register of Historic Places
- U.S. Historic district
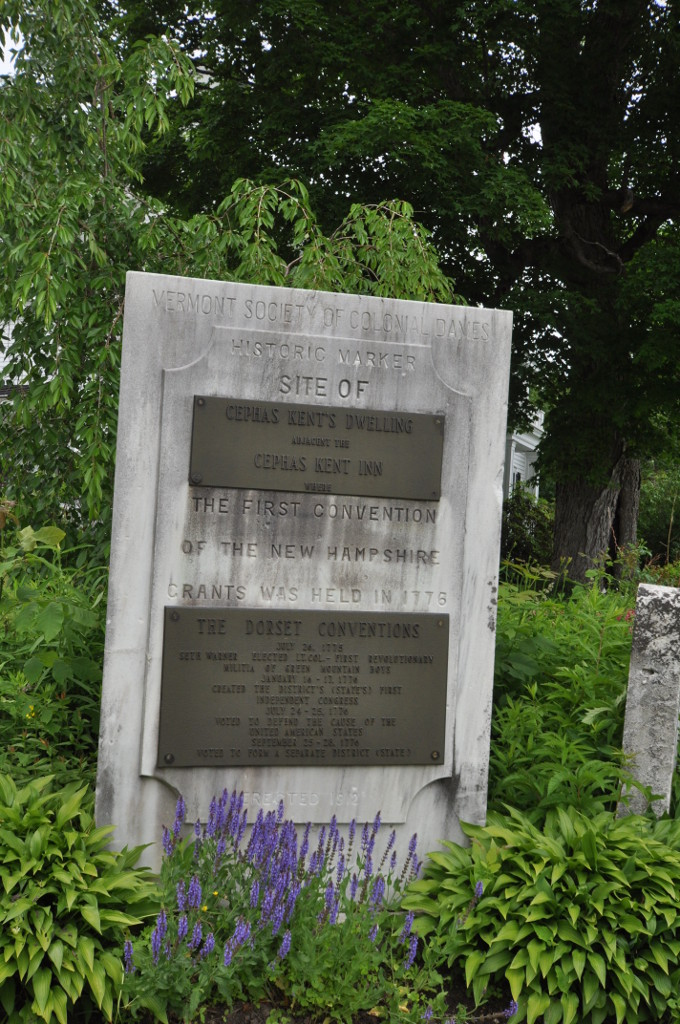

- Location within Vermont Location within the United States
- Location: S of Dorset at Dorset West and Nichols Hill Rds., Dorset, Vermont
- Coordinates: 43°14′22″N 73°5′54″W
- Area: 210 acres (85 ha)
- Built: 1775
- Architectural style: Greek Revival
- NRHP reference No.: 78003203
- Added to NRHP: July 14, 1978

The Kent Neighborhood Historic District encompasses a little-altered early 19th-century rural neighborhood of Dorset, Vermont. Centered at the junction of Dorset West Road and Nichols Hill Road, the area is also historically significant as the site in 1775 of the first meetings that culminated in Vermont's period of independence prior to become the 14th United States state. The district was listed on the National Register of Historic Places in 1978.

== Description and history ==
The Kent Neighborhood is located in western Dorset, south of the main village. It extends along Lane Road to Dorset West Road, and then further westward along Nichols Hill Road. The district is entirely residential, with dispersed houses along the three roads. All are clapboarded wood-frame buildings, and most are stylistically vernacular interpretations of Federal period architecture. The oldest house dates to about 1783, and there are four non-historic 20th century houses interspersed among the older ones, which were typically built before 1850. One of the houses is a former one-room schoolhouse, built in about 1834, and another is notable as the home of George Holley, a leading figure in the development of the area's marble quarries.

One of the area's early settlers was Cephas Kent, Sr., who moved to the area in 1773 and built a house and tavern. While there is some disagreement about which structure was the Cephas Kent Tavern, one of the two buildings stands at the bottom of the road and the other was moved up the hill from its original location. It was at Kent's tavern that a series of meetings took place in 1775, when the settlers of the area that is now Vermont, disputed between New York and New Hampshire, negotiated a set of agreements among themselves that resulted in the founding in 1777 of the independent Vermont Republic. The site of the Kent Tavern is marked by a marble memorial, placed in 1912. Many of the older houses in the area were built by members of the extended Kent family.

== See also ==
- National Register of Historic Places listings in Bennington County, Vermont
