= Harold B. Lee =

11th president of The Church of Jesus Christ of Latter-day Saints

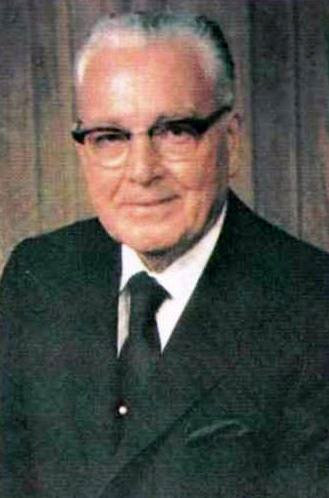

11th President of the Church of Jesus Christ of Latter-day Saints
- July 7, 1972 – December 26, 1973
- Predecessor: Joseph Fielding Smith
- Successor: Spencer W. Kimball

President of the Quorum of the Twelve Apostles (with Spencer W. Kimball as Acting President)
- January 23, 1970 – July 7, 1972
- Predecessor: Joseph Fielding Smith
- Successor: Spencer W. Kimball
- End reason: Became President of the Church

First Counselor in the First Presidency
- January 23, 1970 – July 2, 1972
- Called by: Joseph Fielding Smith
- End reason: Dissolution of First Presidency on the death of Joseph Fielding Smith

Quorum of the Twelve Apostles
- April 10, 1941 – January 23, 1970
- Called by: Heber J. Grant
- End reason: Called as First Counselor in the First Presidency

LDS Church Apostle
- April 10, 1941 – December 26, 1973
- Called by: Heber J. Grant
- Reason: Death of Reed Smoot
- Reorganization at end of term: L. Tom Perry ordained

Personal details
- Born: Harold Bingham Lee; March 28, 1899; Clifton, Idaho, U.S.
- Died: December 26, 1973 (aged 74); Salt Lake City, Utah, U.S.
- Resting place: Salt Lake City Cemetery; 40°46′37.92″N 111°51′28.8″W
- Spouse(s): Fern Lucinda Tanner (1923–1962) (her death); Freda Joan Jensen (1963–1973) (his death)
- Children: 2
- Signature

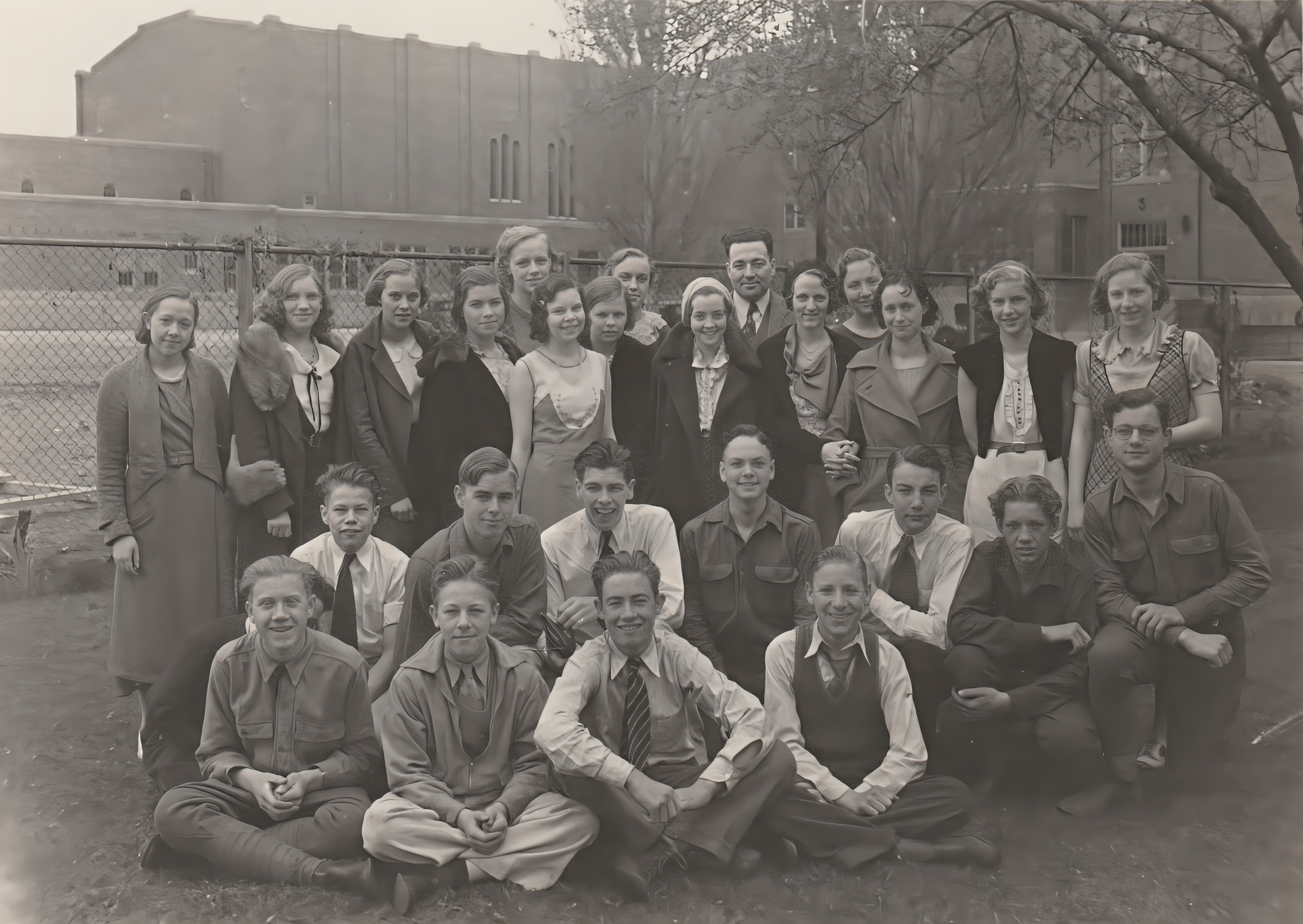
Seminary Teacher at South High School in 1932

Harold Bingham Lee (March 28, 1899 – December 26, 1973) was an American religious leader and educator who served as the 11th president of the Church of Jesus Christ of Latter-day Saints (LDS Church) from July 1972 until his death in December 1973.

== Early life ==
Lee was born in Clifton, Idaho, to Samuel Lee and Louisa Emeline Bingham and was the second of six children. The Lee family lived the rural life and Lee and his siblings spent most of their youth doing farm chores. During his childhood, his mother saved him from death several times. When he was eight, he was sent to get a can of lye from the shelf and spilled the deadly product all over himself. His mother opened a vat of pickled beets and poured cup after cup of the red vinegar all over him, which neutralized the lye. When Harold was a teen, he punctured an artery on a broken bottle. His mother cleaned it, but it became badly infected. She burned a black stocking to ashes and rubbed it in the open wound and it soon healed.

Lee was fortunate to receive a good education. He finished eighth grade at a grammar school in Clifton and his parents allowed him to continue his education at Oneida Stake Academy in Preston, Idaho. The first few years, Lee focused on music and played the alto, French, and baritone horns. Later, he played basketball and was a reporter for the school newspaper. He graduated in the spring of 1916.

The summer following his graduation Lee worked to receive his teaching certificate from Albion State Normal School at Albion, Idaho. After two summers of study in 1916 and 1917, Lee passed the state's fifteen-subject test to receive his second- and third-class certificates. Lee held his first teaching position in the fall of 1916. He taught a class of 25 students, grades one to eight, in Weston, Idaho. His salary was $60 a month. When he was eighteen, he became principal of a school in Oxford, Idaho. In September 1920, church president Heber J. Grant called Lee on a mission to the western states, with headquarters in Denver, Colorado. He was twenty-one and served until December 1922.

== Marriages ==
While on his mission, Lee met a sister missionary from Utah, Fern Lucinda Tanner. They renewed their acquaintance when they returned from their missions and were married on November 14, 1923, in the Salt Lake Temple. Fern died in 1962 and on June 17, 1963, Lee married Freda Joan Jensen, a former mission companion's girlfriend who had remained unmarried. She died on July 1, 1981.

== Civic and community leadership ==
In 1932, at age thirty-three, Lee became a community leader when he was appointed to fill a vacancy in the Salt Lake City Commission. He was assigned to direct the Department of Streets and Public Improvements. A year later his political career was launched when he was elected to the same position.

== Service in the LDS Church ==
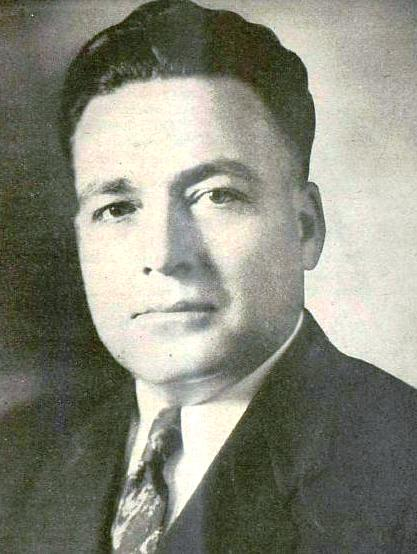
Lee in 1944

In 1930, Lee was called as president of the LDS Church's Pioneer Stake in Salt Lake City. At the time of his setting apart, he was the youngest stake president then serving in the church.

As the 1929 Great Depression in the United States had left more than half of the stakes' members without jobs, Lee established a stake welfare program to aid members in distress. In 1932, the stake organized a Bishop's Storehouse to provide members with basic food necessities. In 1936, Lee became managing director of the Church Welfare Program, overseeing the implementation of a churchwide welfare program based on the Pioneer Stake's. This program—including Bishop's Storehouses—remains in place to this day.

Although he also pursued a political career, he began full-time church service when he was called to the Quorum of the Twelve Apostles in 1941.

Lee served on a committee to streamline church organization and functions. For two decades Lee studied the subject and prepared proposals. Lee was the chairman of the Priesthood Correlation Committee under LDS Church president David O. McKay. The committee restructured church organization in the 1960s, including labeling the children's and women's organizations as auxiliary to the priesthood organization.

According to some historians, Hugh B. Brown petitioned McKay to rescind the policy of excluding people of African ancestry from the priesthood. However, McKay had not felt spiritual impressions that the time was right to do so. Historians observe that Brown continued to seek to reverse the ban "administratively", but Lee was among those who noted that it was a matter of God making his will known through revelation. In December 1969, Lee initiated a release to church leaders, signed by Brown and N. Eldon Tanner, both serving as counselors in the First Presidency. This release regarded the church's support for equal opportunities and civil rights, but also indicated that priesthood policy would not change until God revealed it through revelation.

When McKay died in 1970, Joseph Fielding Smith became church president and Lee was called as First Counselor in the First Presidency. He continued to gain practical experience for what was expected to be a long presidency of his own, given the fact that he was twenty-four years younger than Smith. In 1972, Smith died and Lee became church president. Later that year, Lee organized the church's Jerusalem Branch and presided over its second Area Conference, held in Mexico; and four months prior to his death, presided over the first Area Conference for Germany, Austria, Holland, Italy, Switzerland, France, Belgium, and Spain, held in Munich on August 24–26, 1973.

== Death ==
Lee's presidency proved one of the briefest in the history of the church, lasting from July 7, 1972, to Lee's sudden death due to a fatal pulmonary hemorrhage on December 26, 1973, at age 74. Lee was buried at Salt Lake City Cemetery on December 29, 1973.

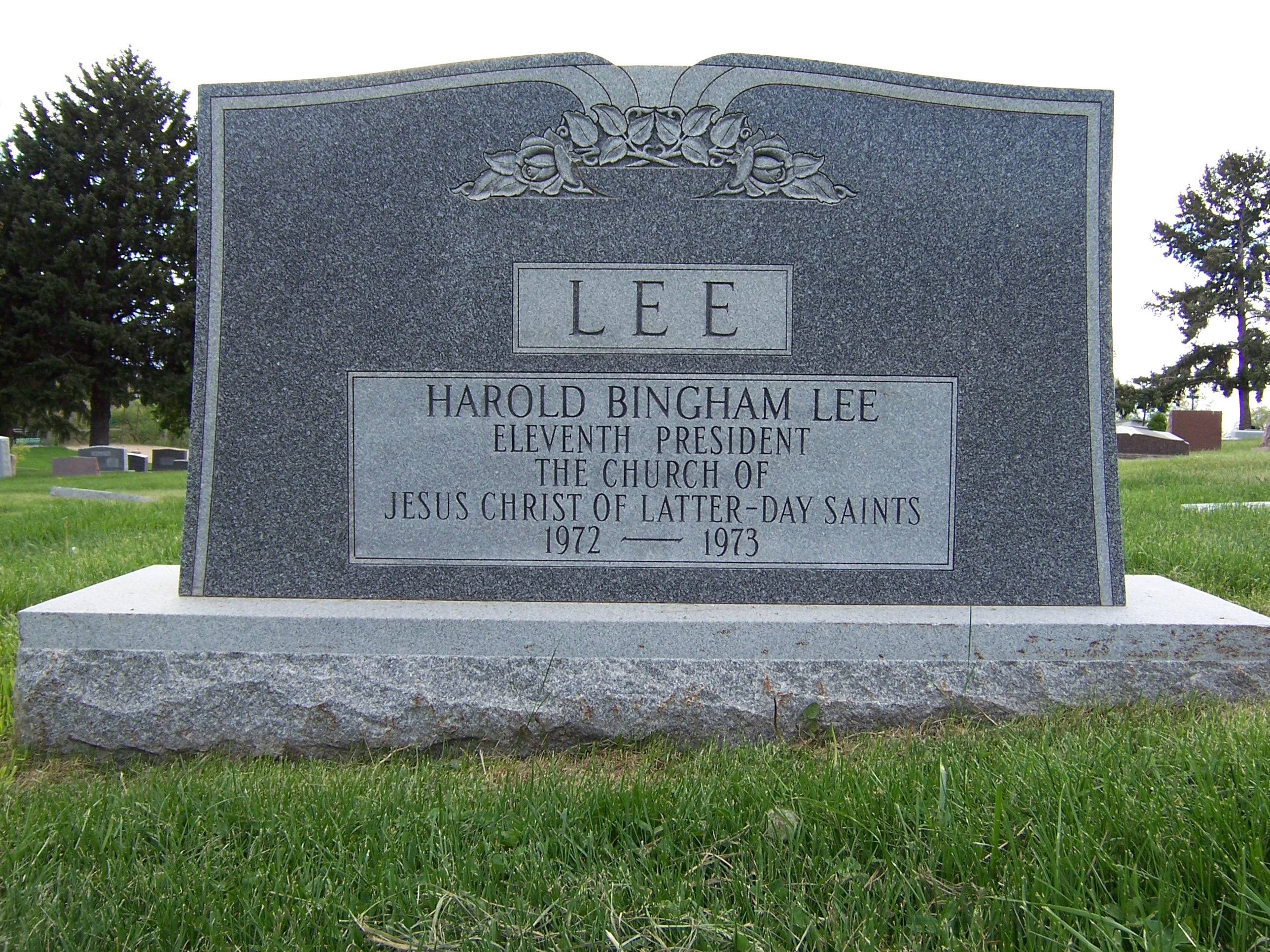
Grave marker of Harold B. Lee

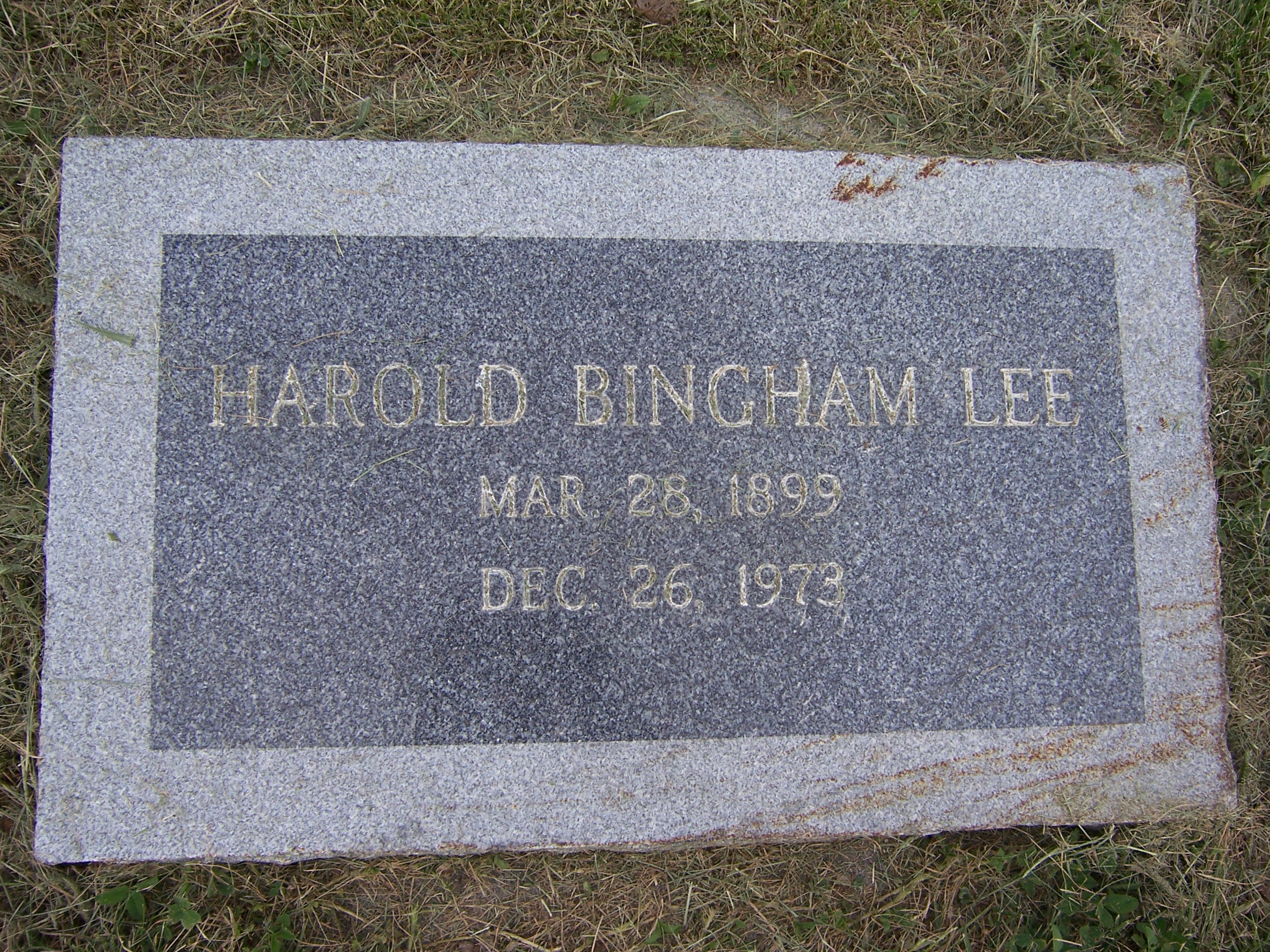
Headstone of Harold B. Lee

== Legacy ==
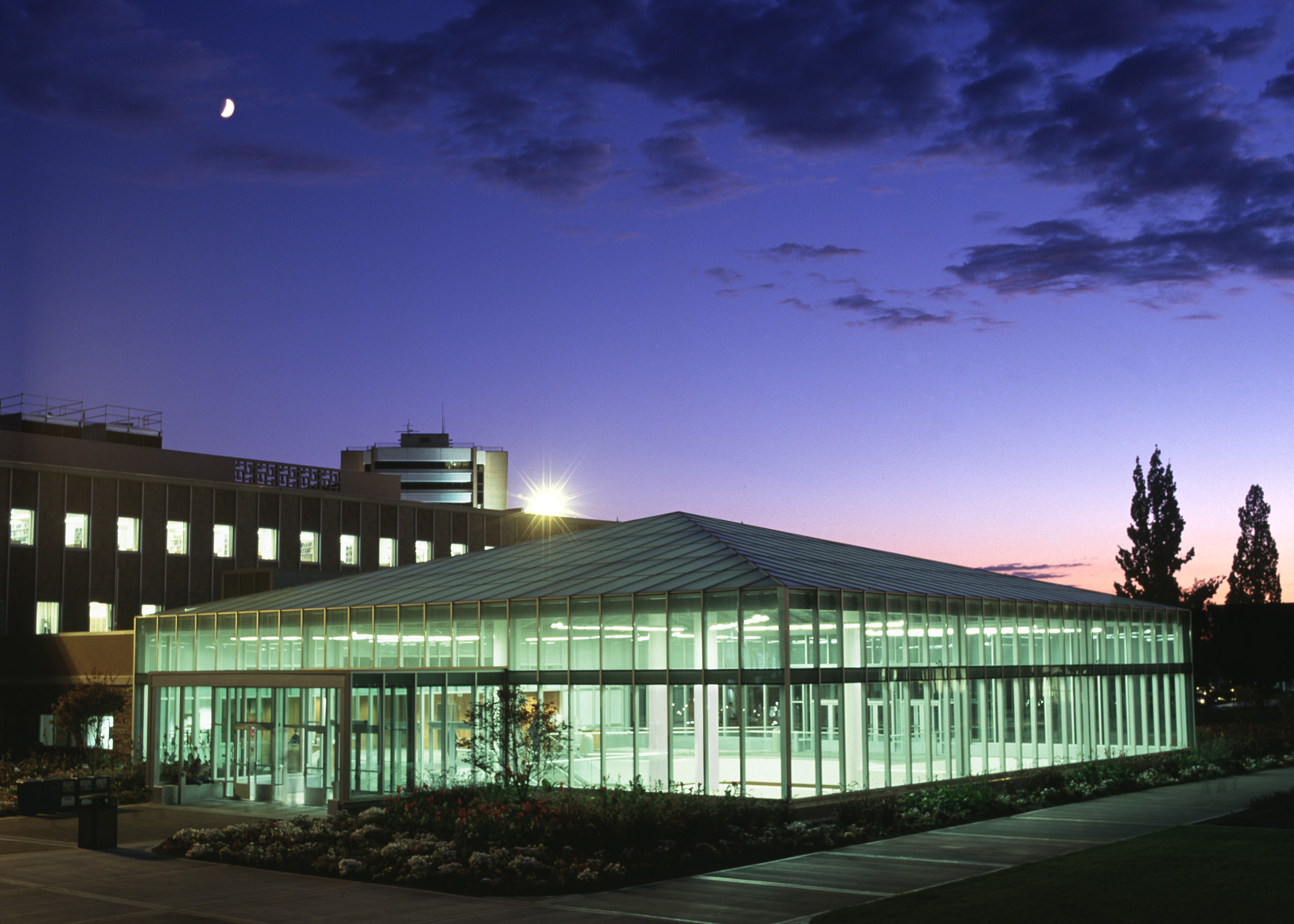
The main library at Brigham Young University was named in Lee's honor after his death.

After his death, a statue of Lee was dedicated at his birthplace. Brigham Young University also honored the former church president by renaming its library after him. The 665,000-square-foot (61,800 m^{2}) Harold B. Lee Library is one of the largest libraries in the western United States and contains 98 miles (158 km) of shelving.

Lee's teachings as an apostle were the 2002 course of study in the LDS Church's Sunday Relief Society and Melchizedek priesthood classes.

== Works ==
- Lee, Harold B. (1945). Youth and the Church (retitled Decisions for Successful Living). Deseret News.
- Lee, Harold B. (1974). Stand Ye in Holy Places: Selected Sermons and Writings of President Harold B. Lee. Deseret Book.
- Lee, Harold B. (1974). Ye Are the Light of the World: Selected Sermons and Writings of President Harold B. Lee. Deseret Book.
- Lee, Harold B. (1996). Clyde J. Williams (ed.). Teachings of Harold B. Lee, Eleventh President of the Church of Jesus Christ of Latter-day Saints. Bookcraft.
- Lee, Harold B. (2000). Teachings of Presidents of the Church: Harold B. Lee. The Church of Jesus Christ of Latter-day Saints. LDS Church publication number 35892.

== Works cited ==
- Gibbons, Francis M. (1993). Harold B. Lee: Man of Vision, Prophet of God. Salt Lake City, UT: Deseret Book. ISBN 0875797164.

The Church of Jesus Christ of Latter-day Saints titles
Preceded by Joseph Fielding Smith	President of the Church; July 7, 1972 – December 26, 1973	Succeeded by Spencer W. Kimball
Preceded by Joseph Fielding Smith	President of the Quorum of the Twelve Apostles; January 23, 1970 – July 7, 1972	Succeeded by Spencer W. Kimball
Preceded by Hugh B. Brown	First Counselor in the First Presidency; January 23, 1970 – July 2, 1972	Succeeded by N. Eldon Tanner
Preceded by Sylvester Q. Cannon	Quorum of the Twelve Apostles; April 10, 1941 – July 7, 1972	Succeeded by Spencer W. Kimball
