= Hugh B. Brown =

American religious leader (1883–1975)

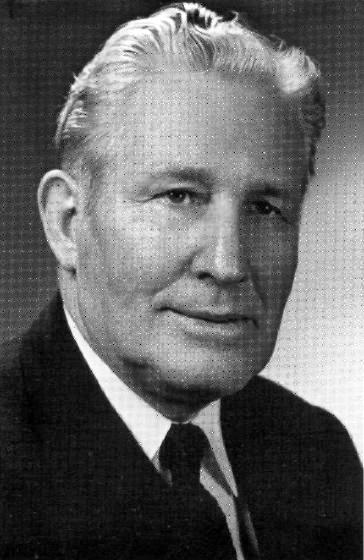

Quorum of the Twelve Apostles
- January 18, 1970 – December 2, 1975

First Counselor in the First Presidency
- October 4, 1963 – January 18, 1970
- End reason: Dissolution of First Presidency on the death of David O. McKay

Second Counselor in the First Presidency
- October 12, 1961 – October 4, 1963
- End reason: Called as First Counselor in the First Presidency

Third Counselor in the First Presidency
- June 22, 1961 – October 12, 1961
- End reason: Called as Second Counselor in the First Presidency

Quorum of the Twelve Apostles
- April 10, 1958 – June 22, 1961
- End reason: Called as Third Counselor in the First Presidency

Apostle
- April 10, 1958 – December 2, 1975
- Reason: Death of Adam S. Bennion
- Reorganization at end of term: David B. Haight ordained

Assistant to the Quorum of the Twelve Apostles
- October 4, 1953 – April 10, 1958
- End reason: Called to the Quorum of the Twelve Apostles

Personal details
- Born: Hugh Brown Brown; October 24, 1883; Granger, Utah Territory
- Died: December 2, 1975 (aged 92); Salt Lake City, Utah, U.S.
- Resting place: Salt Lake City Cemetery; 40°46′37.92″N 111°51′28.8″W

Hugh Brown Brown (Note: The maiden name of Brown's mother was "Brown". Brown was given his mother's maiden name as his second given name.) (October 24, 1883 – December 2, 1975) was an American attorney, educator, author and leader in the Church of Jesus Christ of Latter-day Saints. He was a member of the church's Quorum of the Twelve Apostles and First Presidency. Born in Utah, Brown held both American and Canadian citizenship.

Brown was a talented speaker, and was well known for conveying religious principles and exhortations through accounts of events in his life. His grandson, Edwin B. Firmage, noted: "Possessed at once with a sense of humor that refused him permission to take himself too seriously, and a profound spirituality based on true humility before God, he moved thousands with a style of classic oratory that will be sorely missed."

== Early life ==
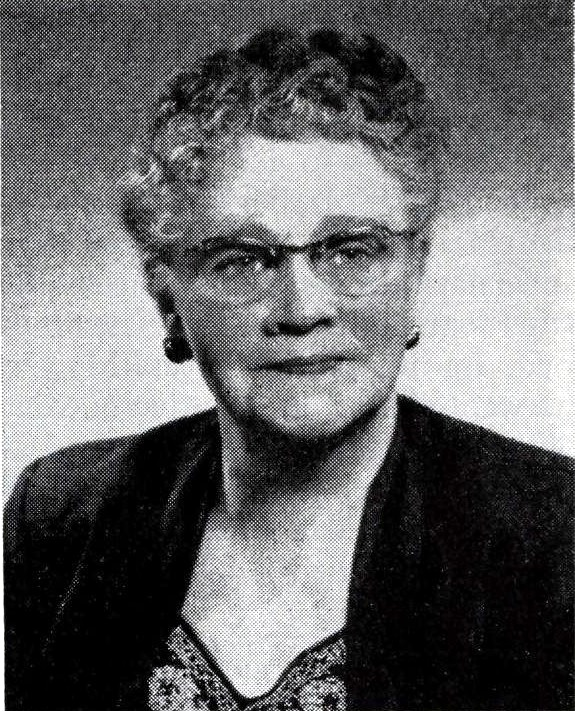
Zina Brown (wife)

Brown was born in Granger, Utah Territory, to Homer Manley Brown and Lydia Jane Brown. He later recorded the event of his birth: "It is alleged that I was born in Granger, Utah, in 1883, on the 24th of October. I was there but do not remember the event. However, my mother was an honest woman and I must take her word." His father had a small farm and orchard. When Brown was fourteen, Homer Brown left Utah with his oldest son to establish a farm in Spring Coulee, in western Canada. Brown was the oldest son left in Salt Lake City, and he and his sister Lillie, 18 months his senior, took care of the farm and orchard until their father sent for the family.

Brown was 15 when his family moved to what is now southern Alberta, which was then part of the Northwest Territories. Shortly after his 18th birthday, he traveled to Logan, Utah, to attend Brigham Young College. Brown also attended Utah State Agricultural College. Dr. John A. Widtsoe suggested a career in agriculture for Brown. After a brief period at the college, Brown was called to England as a missionary for the LDS Church and served under Heber J. Grant from 1904 to 1906. Upon his return, Brown married Zina Young Card, a childhood friend, in 1908. They settled in Alberta, and the first six of the couple's eight children were born there.

=== Military service ===
In 1912, Canadian leaders of the Church asked Brown to go to Calgary and take military training preliminary to organizing a Latter-day Saint contingent for the Canadian reserves. The reserve cavalry unit was established in 1914, with the outbreak of World War I, and became part of the Thirteenth Overseas Mounted Rifles in 1915. By 1917, Brown had achieved the rank of Colonel in the Canadian military noting that "I had made some progress in the First World War in the Canadian army. In fact, I was a field officer, and there was only one man between me and the rank of general, which I had cherished in my heart for years. Then he became a casualty." He believed that he would have attained a higher rank without what Brown perceived as prejudice in the British Empire against the Church members. In one instance, he was told that he was denied further promotion; although the reason was not specified, Brown looked at the papers on the desk of the senior officer that stated, "This man is a Mormon."

Brown suffered what he believed were other injustices from the military establishment, including being forced by a superior officer to sell a beloved horse. The imperial military significantly influenced Brown, as shown in accounts of his service in his later writing, but he ultimately turned away from a military career.

=== Legal training ===
After returning to Canada, Brown was employed as a cowboy, a farmer, and a businessman. He renewed an interest in the study of law, which he began at the Law Society of Alberta prior to his military service, by working with Z. W. Jacobs, a Cardston barrister. Brown completed the five-year apprenticeship while he was working a farm he had purchased near Cardston. After passing the bar examination at the University of Alberta, he was admitted to the bar in 1921.

=== Health challenges ===
Brown suffered from a rare nerve disorder called trigeminal neuralgia (TN), also called Tic Douloureux, which has been called one of the most painful ailments known to mankind. He had the condition attacks intermittently for about 20 years of his life, from 1926. At Christmastime in 1944, while he was overseas during World War II, he sent a three-page, typewritten, single-spaced essay to his family, "An Unprofessional Analysis of 'Tic Douloureux' by a Surviving Victim." The letter stated that he would "be glad to say goodbye to it forever." Brown had surgery to sever his trigeminal nerve in 1945, but the attacks returned while he was teaching at Brigham Young University (BYU) in 1946. He later underwent surgery again at the Mayo Clinic, where a section of his nerve was completely removed, which made the left side of his head completely numb for the rest of his life.

== LDS Church ==
Brown was called as president of the newly-formed Lethbridge, Alberta, Stake in 1921, which included all of Alberta north of the Lethbridge Airport and the Northwest Territories (including present-day Nunavut).

Brown and his family moved to Salt Lake City, Utah, in 1927. He quickly became a successful lawyer and a partner in a law firm with J. Reuben Clark, Jr., Albert E. Bowen, and Preston D. Richards. He formed a lifelong allegiance with the US Democratic Party, which led to an unsuccessful run for political office and a term of service as first chairman of Utah's Liquor Control Commission from 1935 to 1937. Brown was called as president of the Salt Lake Granite Stake.

Brown served as president of the British Mission from 1937 to 1940 and from 1944 to 1946. It was the first of many full-time church positions that brought him admiration and influence. As LDS Servicemen's Coordinator from 1941 to 1945, Brown traveled extensively in North America and western Europe as de facto chief chaplain for the thousands of Latter-day Saints in American, British, and Commonwealth uniforms; anecdotes born of that experience punctuated his sermons and writings thereafter.

Brown worked as a professor of religion at BYU from 1946 to 1950 and also served as the school's co-ordinator of veterans affairs. He then worked as a senior employee with an Alberta oil prospecting firm from 1949 to 1953. Of his time in Alberta, he later wrote:

In October 1953, I was up in the Canadian Rockies, supervising the drilling of an oil well. Although my family were in good health and good spirits and I was making good money, I was deeply depressed and worried. Early one morning I went up into the mountains and talked with the Lord in prayer. I told Him that although it looked like I was going to become wealthy as a result of my oil ventures, if in His wisdom it would not be good for me or my family I hoped He would put an end to it.

That prayer preceded his call as an Assistant to the Quorum of the Twelve Apostles in 1953. Brown remained in that full-time ecclesiastical position for five years until his call as a church apostle.

Brown was ordained an apostle and became a member of the Quorum of the Twelve Apostles on April 10, 1958, replacing Adam S. Bennion, who had died the previous February. He was called to the First Presidency as a third counselor to church president David O. McKay on June 22, 1961. He was called as Second Counselor in the First Presidency on October 12, 1961, upon the death of First Counselor J. Reuben Clark. He was later called as First Counselor in 1963 to replace Henry D. Moyle, who had died.

As an apostle and a member of the First Presidency, Brown favored rescinding the LDS Church's restriction on people of black African descent holding the priesthood. He expected that change to take place in 1969, but the move was reportedly blocked by apostle Harold B. Lee. The change ultimately occurred in 1978, three years after Brown's death.

After McKay died on January 18, 1970, Brown was not retained as a counselor in the First Presidency by the new church president, Joseph Fielding Smith. Only once before in the 20th century had a new president of the church not called a surviving member of the previous First Presidency as a counselor (Rudger Clawson). Brown returned as a member of the Quorum of the Twelve Apostles, where he remained until his death.

== Death ==
Brown died in Salt Lake City and was buried in Salt Lake City Cemetery. After Brown's death, David B. Haight was called to fill the vacancy in the Quorum of the Twelve.

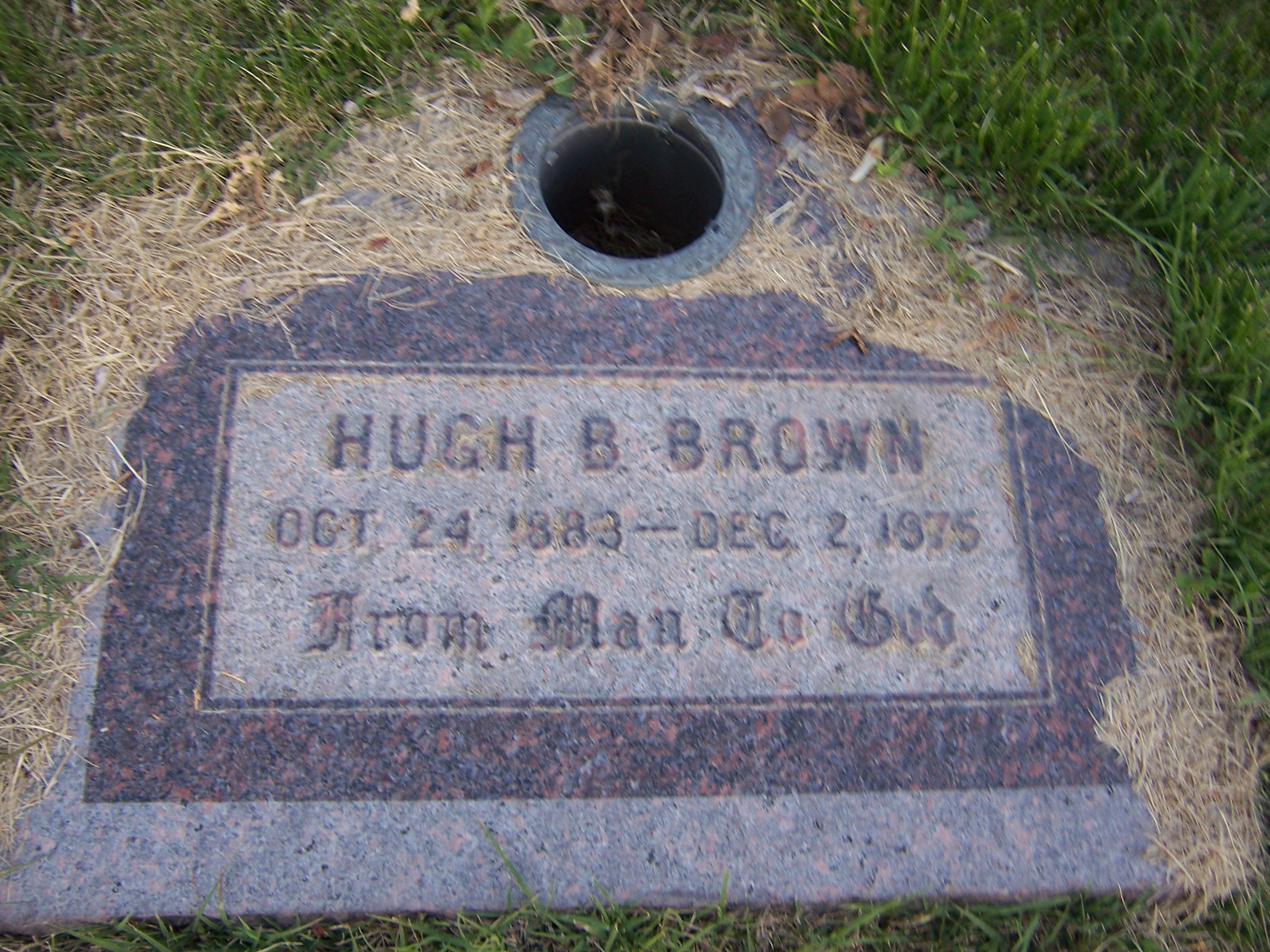
Grave marker of Hugh B. Brown.

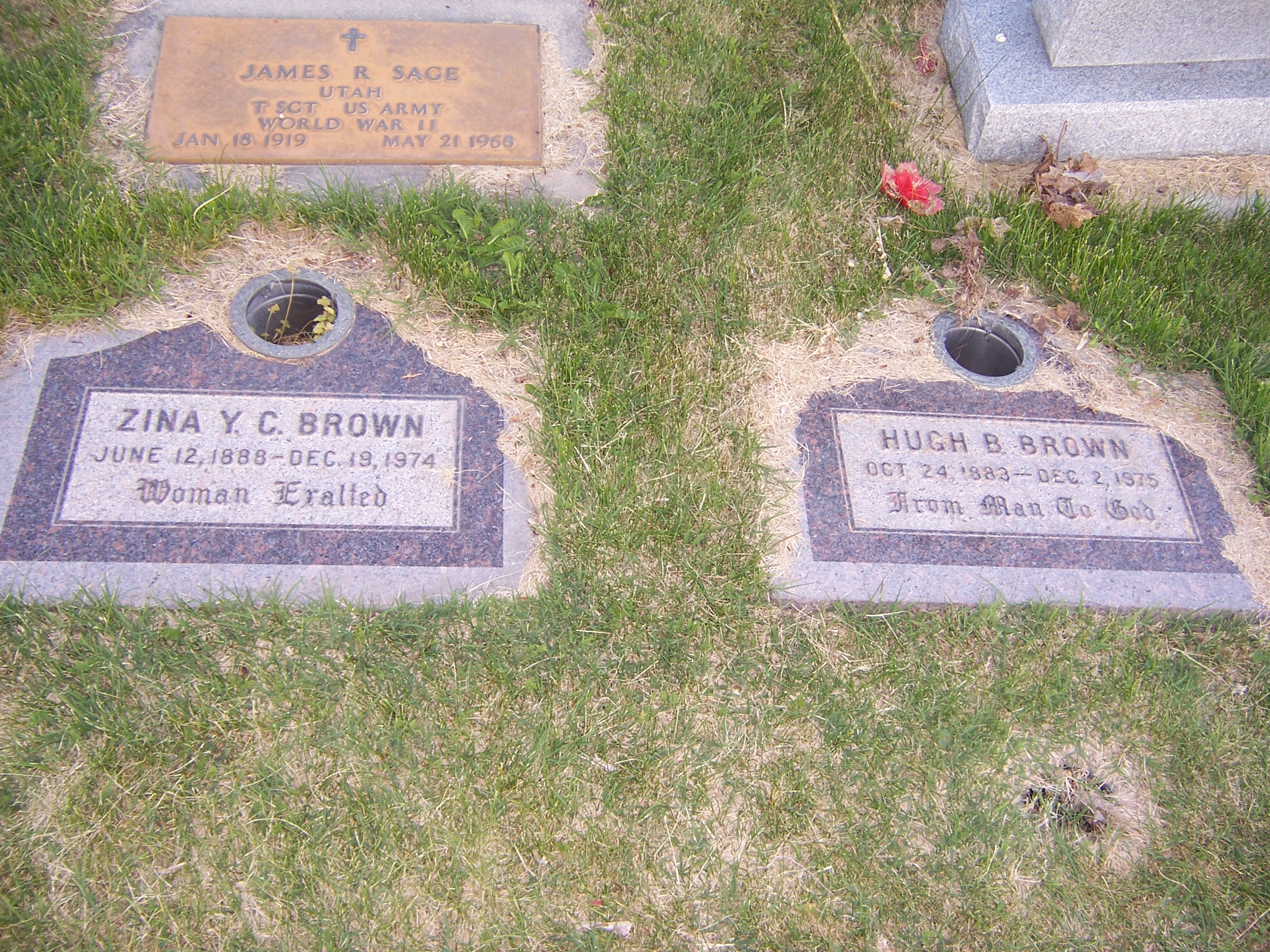
Grave marker of Hugh B. Brown and his wife Zina C. Brown.

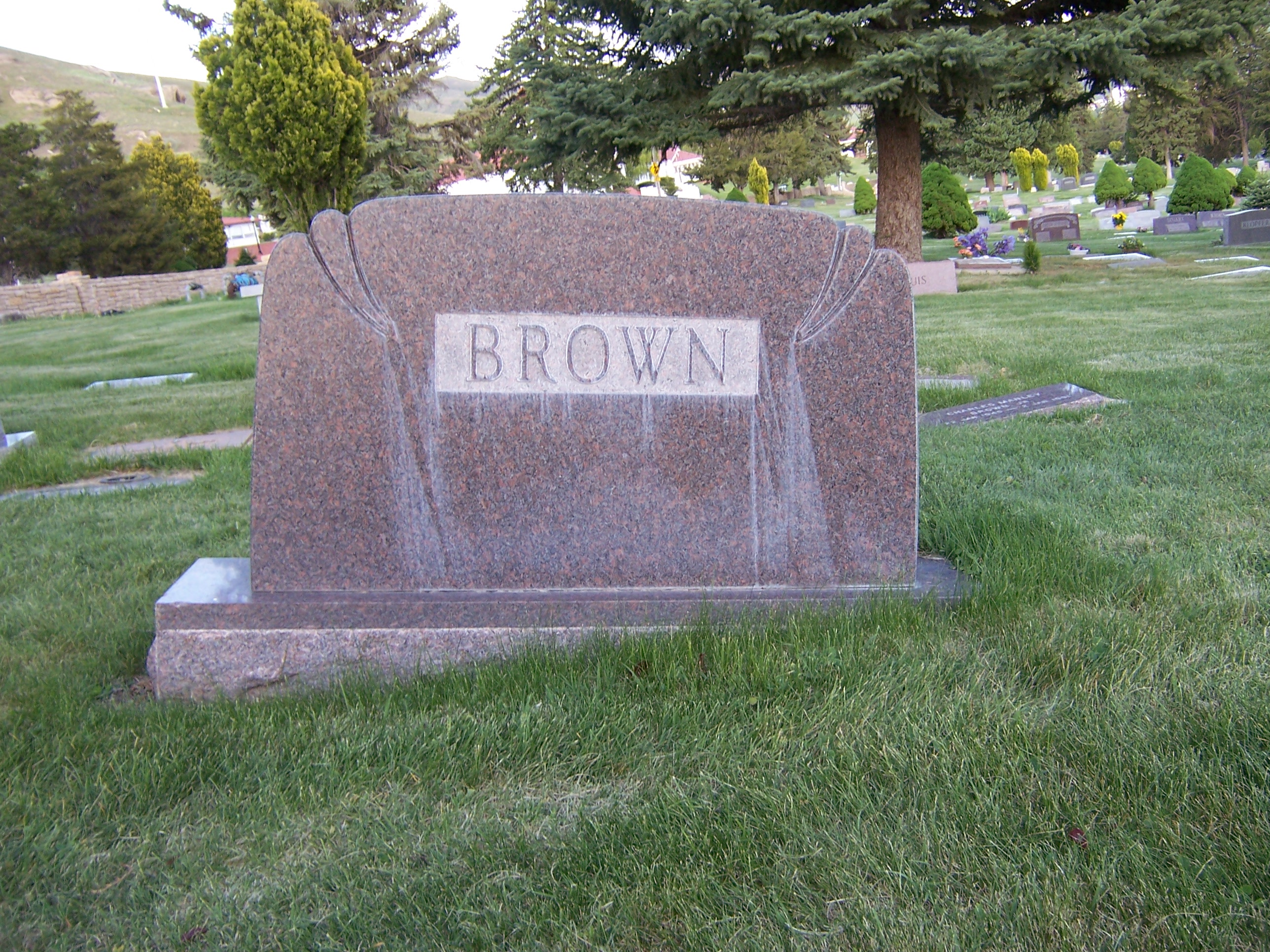
Brown family grave marker.

== Family ==
Among Hugh B. Brown and Zina Card Brown's children was Hugh Card Brown. This son was killed while serving in the military during World War II. Their daughter Zola was Rulon Jeffs' first wife; after he wanted to start practicing plural marriage, Zola divorced him.

== Quotations ==
- "A sense of relationship and copartnership with God involves the concept of universal brotherhood and that will help to develop intelligent tolerance, open-mindedness, and good-natured optimism. Life is really a battle between fear and faith, pessimism and optimism. Fear and pessimism paralyze men with skepticism and futility. One must have a sense of humor to be an optimist in times like these. And you young women will need a sense of humor if you marry these young men and try to live with them. Golden Kimball once said in a conference, 'The Lord Himself must like a joke or he wouldn't have made some of you people.' But your good humor must be real, not simulated. Let your smiles come from the heart and they will become contagious. You may see men on the street any day whose laugh is only a frozen grin with nothing in it but teeth. Men without humor tend to forget their source, lose sight of their goal, and with no lubrication in their mental crankshafts, they must drop out of the race. Lincoln said, 'Good humor is the oxygen of the soul.' And someone paraphrased, 'The surly bird catches the germ.'"
- "We are grateful in the Church and in this great university that the freedom, dignity and integrity of the individual is basic in Church doctrine as well as in democracy. Here we are free to think and express our opinions. Fear will not stifle thought, as is the case in some areas which have not yet emerged from the Dark Ages. God himself refuses to trammel man's free agency even though its exercise sometimes teaches painful lessons. Both creative science and revealed religion find their fullest and truest expression in the climate of freedom.
  "I hope that you will develop the questing spirit. Be unafraid of new ideas for they are the stepping stones of progress. You will of course respect the opinions of others but be unafraid to dissent—if you are informed.
  "Now I have mentioned freedom to express your thoughts, but I caution you that your thoughts and expressions must meet competition in the market place of thought, and in that competition truth will emerge triumphant. Only error needs to fear freedom of expression. Seek truth in all fields, and in that search you will need at least three virtues; courage, zest, and modesty. The ancients put that thought in the form of a prayer. They said, 'From the cowardice that shrinks from new truth, from the laziness that is content with half truth, from the arrogance that thinks it has all truth—O God of truth deliver us'."

== Published works ==
Brown was the author of at least six books, and two compilations were published of his writings.

- Brown, Charles Manley, ed. (1956). Eternal Quest, Selected Addresses of Hugh B. Brown. Bookcraft. ISIN B0007EO8BG.
- Brown, Hugh B. (1965). The Abundant Life (371 pages). Bookcraft. ISIN B0007E8X4O.
- Brown, Hugh B. (1961). Continuing the Quest. Salt Lake City, UT: Deseret Book Company. ISIN B0007FQJB2.
- Brown, Hugh B. (1998). God Is the Gardener and Profile of a Prophet. Deseret Book Company. ISBN 0-87579-974-4.
- Brown, Hugh B. (1962). Mormonism. Deseret Book Company. ISBN 1-59636-117-4. ISIN B0007G3TUA.
- Brown, Hugh B. (1978). Purity is Power. The Church of Jesus Christ of Latter-day Saints. ISIN B00071R3QG.
- Brown, Hugh B. (1971). Vision and Valor. Bookcraft. ISBN 0-938936-99-9. ISIN B0006C0P2K.
- Brown, Hugh B. (1987). You and Your Marriage. Deseret Book Company. ISBN 0-88494-078-0.
- Brown, Hugh B.; Firmage, Edwin B. (August 15, 1999). An Abundant Life: The Memoirs of Hugh B. Brown (Second, enlarged paperback ed.). Signature Books. ISBN 978-1-56085-123-3.

== Notes ==
The Church of Jesus Christ of Latter-day Saints titles
| Preceded by Henry D. Moyle | First Counselor in the First Presidency; October 4, 1963 – January 18, 1970 | Succeeded by Harold B. Lee |
| Preceded by Henry D. Moyle | Second Counselor in the First Presidency; October 12, 1961 – October 4, 1963 | Succeeded by Nathan E. Tanner |
| New position | Third Counselor in the First Presidency; June 22, 1961 – October 12, 1961 | Position discontinued |
| Preceded by George Q. Morris | Quorum of the Twelve Apostles; April 10, 1958 – June 22, 1961; January 18, 1970 – December 2, 1975 | Succeeded by Howard W. Hunter |
