= Whitney, Idaho =

Unincorporated community in the state of Idaho, United States

- Unincorporated community
- Location within Idaho Location within the United States
- Coordinates: 42°03′57″N 111°50′16″W
- Country: United States
- State: Idaho
- Counties: Franklin
- Elevation: 4,603 ft (1,403 m)
- Time zone: UTC-7 (Mountain (MST))
  - Summer (DST): UTC-6 (MDT)
- ZIP code: 83263 (Preston)
- GNIS feature ID: 397309

Whitney is a small unincorporated community in the Cache Valley of Franklin County, Idaho, United States. It is part of the Logan, Utah-Idaho Metropolitan Statistical Area.

Close to the border with Utah, Whitney lies on U.S. 91 between Preston and Franklin.

The place was named after Orson F. Whitney, an Apostle of the Church of Jesus Christ of Latter-day Saints.

The community was the birthplace of Church President Ezra Taft Benson, who is buried in the Whitney cemetery.

Brandon D Woolf, who assumed office as Idaho State Controller in 2012, was raised in Whitney.

The community is agricultural in character. Sugar beets were the main product in the early 20th century.
