= George Miller (bishop) =

Mormon leader (1794–1856)

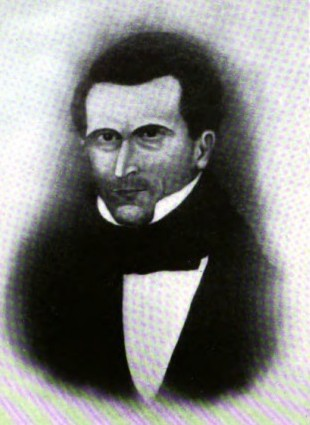

Second Bishop of the Church
- October 7, 1844 – Latter end of 1846
- Called by: Brigham Young
- End reason: Dropped due to opposition to Brigham Young's leadership

Personal details
- Born: November 25, 1794; Standardville, Virginia, United States
- Died: August 27, 1856 (aged 61); Marengo, Illinois, United States
- Spouse(s): Mary Fry; Elizabeth Bouton; Sophia Wallace

George Miller (November 25, 1794 – August 27, 1856) was a prominent convert in the Latter Day Saint movement and was the third ordained bishop in the Latter Day Saint church.

== Early life ==
Miller was born on November 25, 1794, in Standardville, Virginia, to John Miller and Margaret Pfeiffer and was raised in Virginia and Kentucky. He was trained as a carpenter and later operated a mill and a steamboat, working in Ohio, Louisiana, Kentucky, and Virginia. Miller assisted in building a number of buildings on the campus of the University of Virginia in Charlottesville. By 1834, he had purchased a 300-acre (1.2 km^{2}) farm in McDonough County, Illinois. On June 25, 1822, Miller married Mary C. Fry. He had four children with Fry.

== Conversion to the Church of Jesus Christ of Latter-Day Saints ==
In 1839, Miller learned of Latter Day Saint refugees arriving in Illinois from Missouri. He allowed some of these exiles to temporarily reside on his farm. Miller converted to Mormonism, being baptized by John Taylor on August 12, 1839.

Shortly after his conversion, Miller moved to Lee County, Iowa and then Nauvoo, Illinois. By September 1840, he had become a high priest in the Latter Day Saint church. Joseph Smith, Hyrum Smith, and Newel Knight performed his ordination. In 1840 and 1841, Miller served as a church missionary in Iowa and Illinois.

== Bishop and other service ==
On January 19, 1841, Joseph Smith received a revelation (now known as Doctrine and Covenants 124:20–34, 60, and 70) that stated that Miller should be made a bishop in the church and head the committee charged with organizing the construction of the Nauvoo House. He eventually acted as the president of the Nauvoo House Association. He traveled to the Black River in Wisconsin to obtain lumber for the construction of the Nauvoo House and acted as bishop of the church in the area. In December 1841, Miller became the Worshipful Master of the Nauvoo Masonic lodge. He then became brigadier general of the Nauvoo Legion in September 1842 after having served as captain and colonel. He also defended Joseph Smith in a letter to Thomas Reynolds, the governor of Missouri at the time, against charges that Smith had planned to assassinate Lilburn Boggs. Miller was one of the first members of the church to participate in the ordinance of the endowment, taking part in the ceremony on May 4, 1842.

In 1843, Miller served a mission to Mississippi and Alabama with Peter Haws. He became a member of the Council of Fifty on March 11, 1844, and, later that year, was sent to Kentucky to campaign for the election of Joseph Smith to the office of President of the United States. Also in 1844, Miller was named the "second bishop" of the church, a position under the direction of Newel K. Whitney, the presiding bishop of the church at the time.

== Succession crisis and break with Brigham Young ==
Upon hearing about the death of Joseph Smith, Miller returned to Nauvoo. A succession crisis ensued whereby a variety of men vied for the leadership of the Latter Day Saints. The majority of Latter Day Saints accepted the leadership of Brigham Young and the Quorum of the Twelve, and Miller provided lukewarm support for this decision. Miller was appointed to be a legal trustee-in-trust for the church in 1844. Miller was sustained as the "Second Bishop of the Church" on October 7, 1844.

Miller petitioned Brigham Young for approval to construct a building for the high priests quorum in Nauvoo, but Young rejected Miller's plan. This signaled the start of cool relations between Miller and Young which eventually led to Miller's abandonment of the organization led by Young. Although Miller left Nauvoo under Young's instructions in 1846, and came as far as Winter Quarters, Nebraska, Miller informed Young in January 1847 that he would not follow him to the Salt Lake Valley, as Young had planned. Rather, Miller accepted the leadership claims of apostle Lyman Wight and emigrated with Wight and his followers to the Republic of Texas. Miller was excommunicated from the church on December 3, 1848.

== Later life ==
By 1849, Miller had become convinced that Lyman Wight and his "Wightite" church were apostate. He became convinced that James J. Strang was the true successor to Joseph Smith, and in 1850 he left to join Strang's followers in Wisconsin. Miller arrived in Voree, Wisconsin, on September 4, 1850, and shortly thereafter moved with Strang and his followers to Beaver Island, Michigan. In Beaver Island, he was an active member of Strang's Church of Jesus Christ of Latter Day Saints. When Strang was assassinated in 1856, Miller left Beaver Island with the other departing "Strangites". Miller died in the second half of 1856 in Marengo, Illinois at the age of 60. He was en route to California at the time.

== Marriages ==
Miller's first wife, Mary Fry, was sealed to him in the Nauvoo Temple on 13 January 1846. Miller practiced plural marriage, and he was sealed to Elizabeth Bouton and Sophia Wallace on January 25, 1846.

== Status in LDS Church: Presiding Bishop? ==
There is debate as to whether Miller should today be accepted as a former presiding bishop of the Church of Jesus Christ of Latter-day Saints. The office of presiding bishop was not established as such in the church until the tenure of Edward Hunter. Nevertheless, Edward Partridge, the first bishop of the Latter Day Saint movement, is usually regarded as the first presiding bishop of the LDS Church. On the same day that Miller was sustained as the "Second Bishop" of the church, Newel K. Whitney—who was the second ordained bishop in church history—was sustained as the "First Bishop" of the church; therefore, Whitney is usually recognized by the LDS Church as the de facto presiding bishop until his death in 1850, with Miller as a subordinate or assistant to Whitney until his break with the LDS Church in 1848.

== See also ==
- List of sects in the Latter Day Saint movement

== Notes ==
Church of Jesus Christ of Latter Day Saints titles
Position Vacant; May 27, 1840 – October 7, 1844; Preceded by: Isaac Morley as First Counselor to the Bishop of the Church of the Church of Jesus Christ of Latter Day Saints titles	Second Bishop of the Church; October 7, 1844 – Latter end of 1846	Position Vacant; April 6, 1847– September 23, 1850; Preceded by: Leonard W. Hardy as First Counselor in the Presiding Bishopric
