= John Winder =

John Winder may refer to:

- John R. Winder (1821–1910), English leader in The Church of Jesus Christ of Latter-day Saints
- John H. Winder (1800–1865), Confederate general in the American Civil War
