= Robert T. Burton =

American Mormon leader (1821–1907)

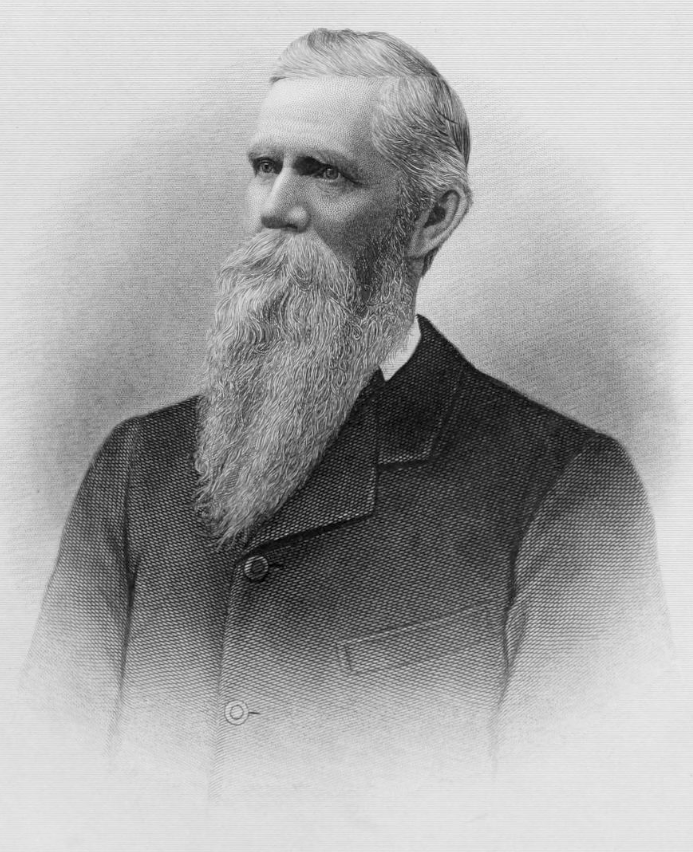

First Counselor in the Presiding Bishopric
- 5 October 1884 – 11 November 1907
- Called by: William B. Preston

Second Counselor in the Presiding Bishopric
- 9 October 1874 – 16 October 1883
- Called by: Edward Hunter
- End reason: Death of Edward Hunter

Military career
- Allegiance: United States
- Unit: Nauvoo Legion: First Regiment of Cavalry
- Commands held: First Regiment of Cavalry
- Battles/wars: Utah War (Note: Served with allegiance to the State of Deseret) American Civil War Morrisite War

Personal details
- Born: Robert Taylor Burton; 25 October 1821; Amherstburg, Upper Canada
- Died: 11 November 1907 (aged 86); Salt Lake City, Utah, United States
- Resting place: Salt Lake City Cemetery; 40.777°N 111.858°W
- Spouse(s): Maria Susan Haven; Susan Ellen McBride; Sarah Anna Garr
- Children: 27
- Parents: Samuel Burton; Hannah Shipley
- Signature
Notes
Member of the presiding bishopric of from 1874 until his death. He was also one of the principal officers in the Nauvoo Legion during its Utah reconstitution (including the Utah War) and led the territorial militia against the Morrisites during the 1862 Morrisite War.

Robert Taylor Burton (25 October 1821 – 11 November 1907) was a member of the presiding bishopric of the Church of Jesus Christ of Latter-day Saints (LDS Church) from 1874 until his death. He was also one of the principal officers in the Nauvoo Legion during its Utah reconstitution (including during the Utah War) and led the territorial militia against the Morrisites during the 1862 Morrisite War.

== Biography ==
Born in Amherstburg, Upper Canada, Burton was called by Presiding Bishop Edward Hunter to be his second counselor in 1874. Burton served in this capacity until Hunter's death in 1883. When William B. Preston was called to be the new Presiding Bishop in 1884, Burton was asked to serve as his first counselor. Burton served in this capacity until his death.

Burton joined the LDS Church in Upper Canada in 1838.

In 1856, Burton was part of the rescue party sent from Salt Lake City to assist the stranded Martin Handcart Company near the Sweetwater River. In 1870, Burton was tried and acquitted for the murder of Isabella Bowman, a person who had been killed by Utah militia while surrendering in the Morrisite War.

Burton practiced plural marriage and fathered 27 children. He married his first wife, Maria S. Haven (1826–1920) in 1845. He married his other two wives, Sarah A. Garr and Susan E. McBride in 1856. He is the great-great-grandfather of a former presiding bishop of the LDS Church, H. David Burton.

Burton died at his home in Salt Lake City on 11 November 1907, and was buried at Salt Lake City Cemetery.

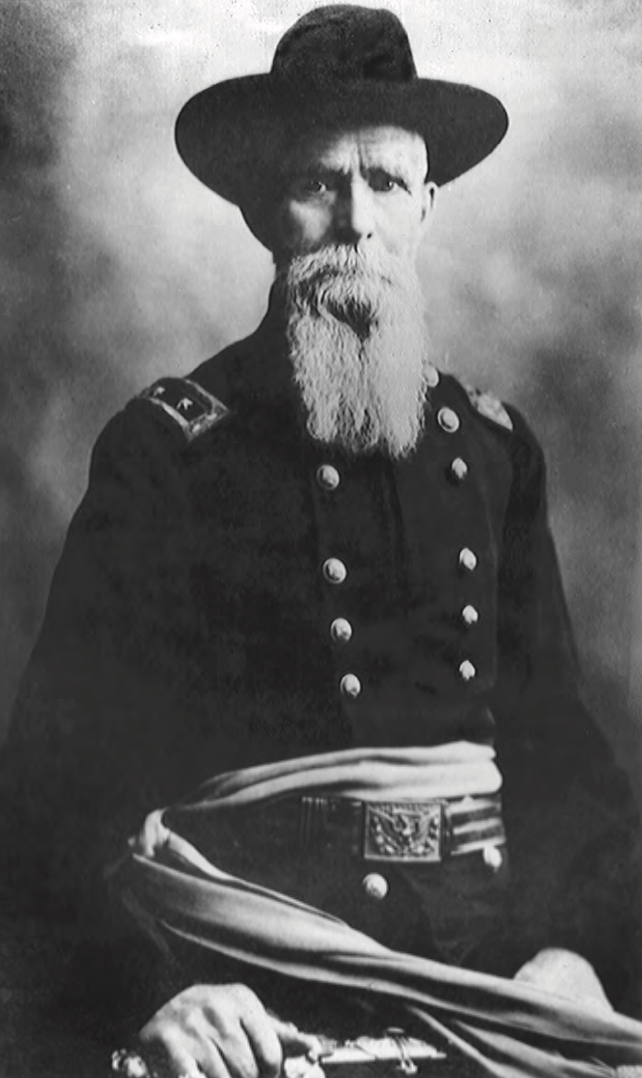
Robert Taylor Burton in his cavalry uniform

== See also ==
- Council on the Disposition of the Tithes
- Nauvoo Brass Band
- Orrin P. Miller

== Notes ==
The Church of Jesus Christ of Latter-day Saints titles
Preceded by Leonard W. Hardy	First Counselor in the Presiding Bishopric; 5 October 1884 – 11 November 1907	Succeeded by Orrin P. Miller
Preceded by Jesse Carter Little	Second Counselor in the Presiding Bishopric; 9 October 1874 – 5 October 1884	Succeeded by John Q. Cannon
