= Endowment (Latter Day Saints) =

Latter Day Saint temple practice

In the theology of the Latter Day Saint movement, an endowment refers to a gift of "power from on high", typically associated with the ordinances performed in Latter Day Saint temples. The purpose and meaning of the endowment varied during the life of movement founder Joseph Smith. The term has referred to many such gifts of heavenly power, including the confirmation ritual, the institution of the High Priesthood in 1831, events and rituals occurring in the Kirtland Temple in the mid-1830s, and an elaborate ritual performed in the Nauvoo Temple in the 1840s.

The term endowment has the most significance to adherents of the Latter Day Saint branch known as Mormonism, including most prominently the Church of Jesus Christ of Latter-day Saints (LDS Church), which practices a form of the Nauvoo endowment. The Nauvoo endowment ceremony, introduced by Joseph Smith and codified by Mormon leader Brigham Young, consisted of symbolic acts and covenants designed to prepare participants to officiate in priesthood ordinances, and to give them the keywords and tokens they need to pass by angels guarding the way to heaven. In the LDS Church's modern practices, the endowment ceremony directs new participants to take a number of solemn oaths or covenants such as an oath of consecration to the LDS Church. Also in the LDS Church's modern practices, completing the endowment ceremony is a prerequisite to both full-time missionary service and temple marriage. In order to enter a temple and participate in the endowment ceremony, church members must hold a current temple recommend.

== 1830 endowments: Endowment of the Holy Spirit and confirmation ==
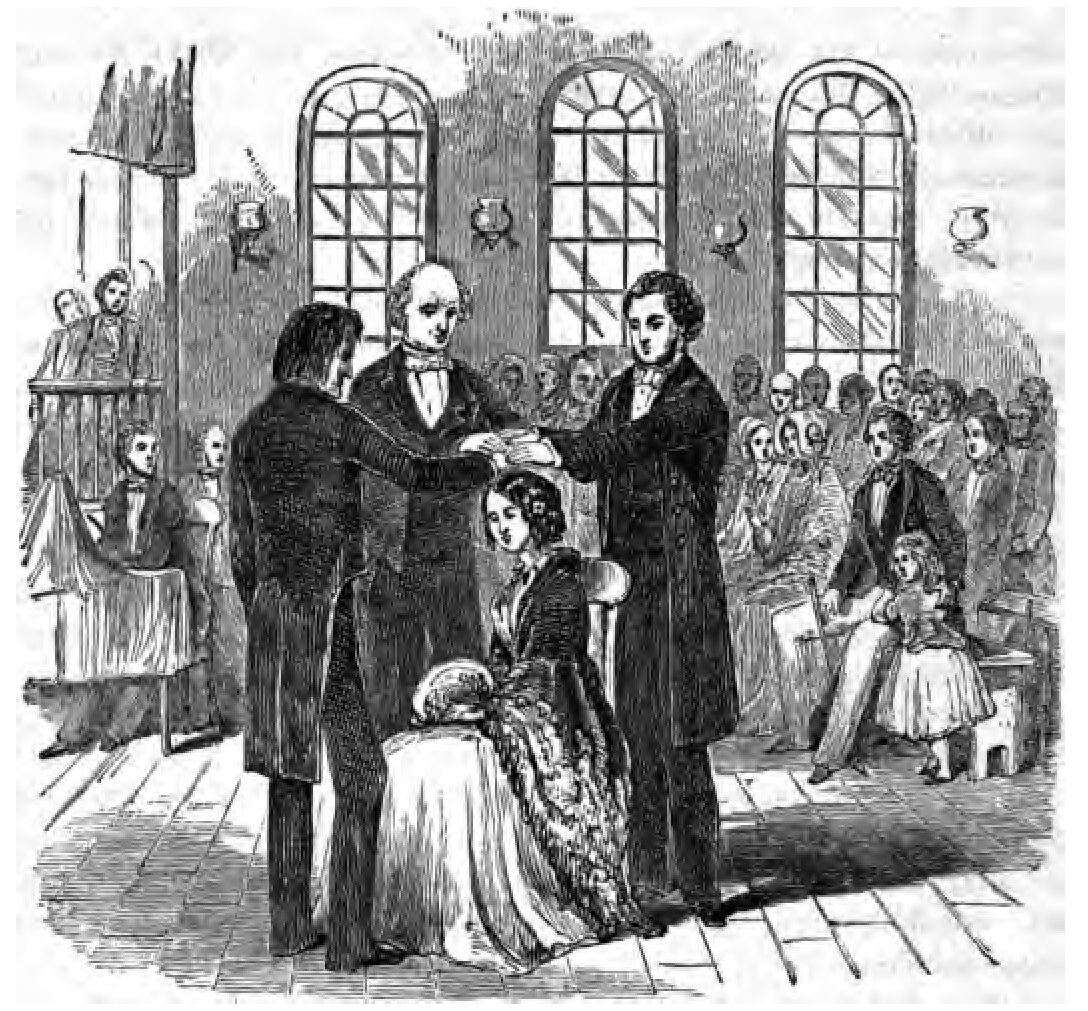
A Latter Day Saint confirmation.

Although it was not generally referred to as an endowment at the time, in retrospect, Latter Day Saints have viewed the confirmation, first performed on April 6, 1830, and attendant outpourings of the spiritual gifts, as an early type of endowment. The term derives from the Authorized King James Version, referring to the spiritual gifts given the disciples of Jesus on the day of Pentecost, in which they were "endowed with power from on high". Subsequent to these early confirmations, Mormons exhibited what they viewed as spiritual gifts such as having visions, prophecy, gift of healing, gift of knowledge, gift of tongues. Unlike the other Latter Day Saint endowments, confirmation has continued to coexist with later endowments as a separate Latter Day Saint ordinance. In the Community of Christ, formerly known as the Reorganized Church of Jesus Christ of Latter Day Saints, the "endowment of the Holy Spirit" such as occurred on the day of Pentecost is the only recognized endowment.

== 1831 Kirtland endowment: Conferral of the High Priesthood ==
The first reference to an endowment by Joseph Smith, the founder of the Latter Day Saint movement, was in early 1831, some days after Smith was joined in his ministry by Sidney Rigdon, a newly converted Campbellite minister from Ohio. Rigdon's congregation also was converted to Smith's Church of Christ. Rigdon had apparently disagreed with the Campbellites in that he believed in a Pentecostal endowment of power beyond the abiding presence of the Holy Spirit endowed upon confirmation. While Rigdon believed the teachings of the early Mormon missionaries who converted him, he thought the missionaries were lacking in heavenly power.

In January 1831, Smith issued a revelation where he wrote that after Mormons relocated to Kirtland, Ohio, they would "be endowed with power from on high" and "sent forth". Smith reiterated this in February 1831, stating that the "elders of the church Smith reaffirmed that the faithful members would "be taught from on high" and "endowed with power", and that God would call the elders of the church together in Kirtland in a general conference and "pour out [his] Spirit upon them in that day they assemble themselves together". In a revelation given to an individual, Smith assured the man that "at the conference meeting he [would] be ordained unto power from on high".

This general conference of the church was held from June 3 to June 6, 1831, in which a number of men were ordained to the "High" or "Melchizedek" Priesthood for the first time, which ordination "consisted [of] the endowment--it being a new order--and bestowed authority". Later that year, an early convert who had left the church claimed that many of the Saints "have been ordained to the High Priesthood, or the order of Melchizedek; and profess to be endowed with the same power as the ancient apostles were".

== 1833 Kirtland endowment: School of the Prophets ==
In 1833, Joseph Smith established what he called a School of the Prophets,

Although the events at this school were never specifically called an "endowment", it has been classified as such by scholars including Gregory A. Prince because of similarities with the 1831 and 1836 endowments, and the fact that part of the school's stated intention was so that the church's elders could be "endowed with power from on high". At the beginning, the school was "accompanied by a pentecostal outpouring, including speaking in tongues, prophesying and 'many manifestations of the holy spirit'". It included a new Latter Day Saint ordinance of foot washing.

== 1836 Kirtland endowment ==
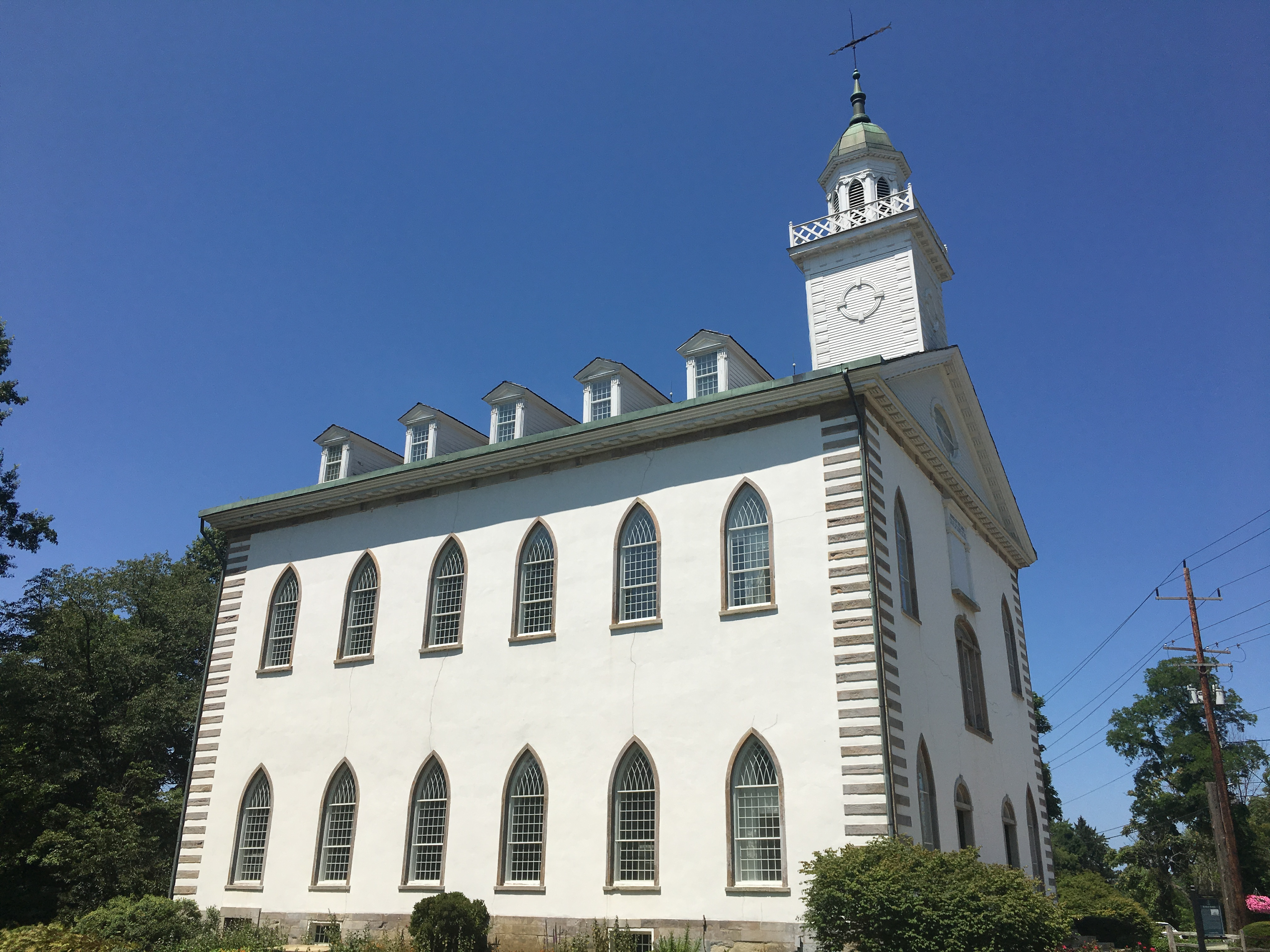
Kirtland Temple, site of the Kirtland endowment in 1836 and 1837.

A year and a half after the June 1831 endowment, Smith said he received a revelation in December 1832 to prepare to build a "house of God", or a temple. A revelation soon followed identifying the location of the temple in Kirtland, Ohio, and another revelation affirmed that in this building the Lord "design[ed] to endow those [he] had chosen with power on high". In a later revelation the Lord indicated that the elders were to be "endowed with power from on high; for [he had] prepared a greater endowment" than the 1831 endowment. Upon the completion of the Kirtland Temple after three years of construction (1833–36), the elders of the church gathered for this second promised endowment in early 1836.

The Kirtland Temple endowment ceremonies were patterned after Old Testament sacerdotal practices. They consisted of preparatory washings, administered in private homes, in which men washed and purified their bodies with water and alcohol. After this, they gathered in the temple where they were anointed with specially consecrated oil and with blessings pronounced upon their heads by Smith and other church leaders. The men's anointings were sealed with uplifted hands. Following these ceremonies many men reported participating in extraordinary spiritual experiences, such as seeing visions, speaking prophecies or receiving revelations. The culmination of the endowment was a solemn assembly, held on March 30, in which the men partook of the sacrament and then washed each other's feet. Those present spent the rest of the day and night prophesying, speaking in tongues, testifying and exhorting each other. To those present it was a "day of Pentecost". Indeed, Smith told the solemn assembly that they could now "go forth and build up the kingdom of God".

On April 3, 1836, Joseph Smith and Oliver Cowdery recounted the appearance of Jesus to them in the Kirtland Temple, and his acceptance of the building as his house. This was followed by the appearance of three prophets: Moses, Elias, and Elijah, each of whom bestowed additional temple-related authority on the two men.

Initially, Smith intended the Kirtland endowment to become an annual affair; he administered the same ceremonies again in 1837. However, because of persecution the Mormons largely abandoned Kirtland and its temple in 1838-39 and moved west. As Smith's theology expanded during the 1840s, the Kirtland endowment was superseded by the Nauvoo endowment. Mormons looked back upon the Kirtland Temple rituals with the authority bestowed by the three prophets as preparatory to the greater endowment revealed at Nauvoo. This was certainly the view of Brigham Young, who said:

And those first Elders who helped to build it [Kirtland Temple], received a portion of their first endowments, or we might say more clearly, some of the first, or introductory, or initiatory ordinances, preparatory to an endowment. The preparatory ordinances there administered, though accompanied the ministration of angels, and the presence of the Lord Jesus, were but a faint similitude of the ordinances of the House of the Lord in their fulness.

== Nauvoo endowment ==
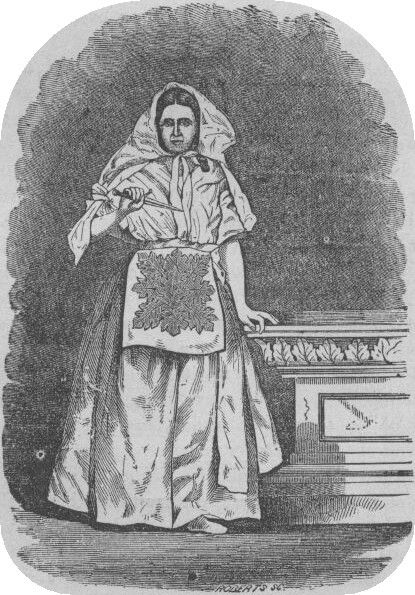
A woman dressed in the robes of the Nauvoo endowment, circa the 1870s.

On May 3, 1842, Joseph Smith prepared the second floor of his Red Brick Store, in Nauvoo, Illinois, to represent "the interior of a temple as circumstances would permit". The next day, May 4, he introduced the Nauvoo endowment ceremony to nine associates: Associate President and Patriarch to the Church Hyrum Smith (Smith's brother); first counselor in the First Presidency, William Law; three of the Twelve Apostles, Brigham Young, Heber C. Kimball and Willard Richards; Nauvoo stake president, William Marks; two bishops, Newel K. Whitney and George Miller; and a close friend, Judge James Adams of Springfield, Illinois.

Throughout 1843 and 1844, Smith continued to initiate other men, as well as women, into the endowment ceremony. By the time of his death on June 27, 1844, more than 50 persons had been admitted into the Anointed Quorum, the name by which this group called themselves.

The Nauvoo endowment consisted of two phases: (1) an initiation, and (2) an instructional and testing phase. The initiation consisted of a washing and anointing, culminating in the clothing of the patron in a "Garment of the Holy Priesthood", which is thereafter worn as an undergarment.

The instructional and testing phase of the endowment consisted of a scripted reenactment of Adam and Eve's experience in the Garden of Eden (performed by live actors called officiators; in the mid-20th century certain portions were adapted to a film presentation). The instruction is punctuated with personal covenants, gestures, and a prayer circle around an altar. At the end of instruction, the initiate's knowledge of symbolic gestures and key-words is tested at a "veil", a symbolic final frontier for the initiate to face the judgment of Jesus, before entering the presence of God in the celestial kingdom.

== See also ==
- Temple (Latter Day Saints)
