= George Goddard (Mormon) =

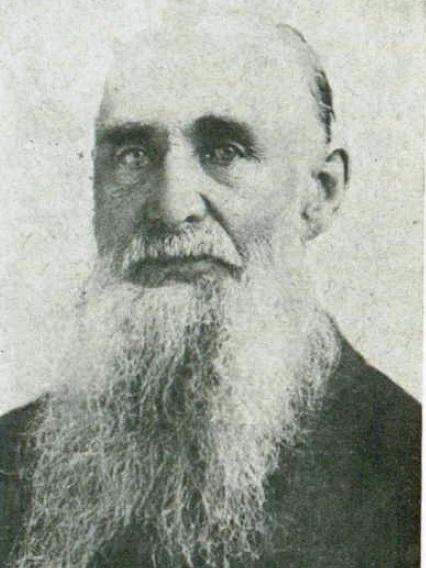

Personal details
- Born: December 15, 1815; Leicester, England
- Died: January 12, 1899 (aged 83); Salt Lake City, Utah, United States
- Resting place: Salt Lake City Cemetery; 40.777°N 111.858°W
- Spouse(s): Elizabeth Harrison; Mary Sutton
- Children: 11+
- Parents: Cornelius Goddard; Mary Groce

George Goddard (December 15, 1815 – January 12, 1899) was a Mormon pioneer and a leader in the Church of Jesus Christ of Latter-day Saints (LDS Church).

Goddard was born in Leicester, England. He was converted to the LDS Church in January 1851. He and his wife and children emigrated from England to Utah Territory, arriving in Salt Lake City on September 15, 1852.

In 1857 and 1858, Goddard served as a church missionary to Canada. From 1856 to 1883, Goddard was the clerk to LDS Church presiding bishop Edward Hunter. From 1874 to 1884, Goddard was the clerk of the LDS Church's biannual general conferences.

In 1872, Goddard became the inaugural first assistant to George Q. Cannon, the first superintendent of the Deseret Sunday School Union. Goddard served in this capacity for 26 years, until his death in 1899. Goddard was also a member of the Mormon Tabernacle Choir and a patriarch in the church. He died in Salt Lake City and was buried at Salt Lake City Cemetery.

Goddard is credited with having first printed the LDS Church's Articles of Faith in card form, having published several thousand copies for the church's Sunday School on February 18, 1878.
