= Isaac Morley =

Early LDS Church leader

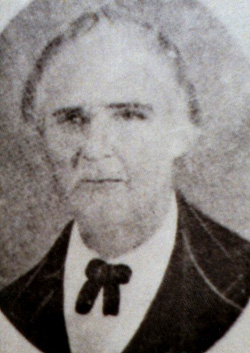

First Counselor to the Bishop of the Church
- June 3, 1831 – May 27, 1840
- Called by: Edward Partridge
- End reason: Honorably released at death of Edward Partridge

Leader of Sanpete Mormon Colony

In office
- 1849 – 1854

Personal details
- Born: March 11, 1786; Montague, Massachusetts, U.S.
- Died: June 24, 1865 (aged 79); Fairview, Utah Territory, U.S.
- Resting place: Manti Cemetery; 39.2764°N 111.6328°W
- Spouse(s): Lucy Gunn; Leonora Snow; Hannah Blakesley; Hannah Knight Libby; Harriet Lucinda Cox; Hannah Sibley; Nancy Anne Bache

Isaac Morley (March 11, 1786 – June 24, 1865) was an early member of the Latter Day Saint movement and a contemporary of both Joseph Smith and Brigham Young. He was one of the first converts to Smith's Church of Christ. Morley was present at many of the early events of the Latter Day Saint movement, and served as a church leader in Ohio, Missouri, and Utah Territory.

Morley was born on March 11, 1786, in Montague, Massachusetts to Thomas E. Morley and Editha Morley (née Marsh). His parents were members of the Presbyterian faith. Morley served in the War of 1812 from 1812–15, holding the position of captain in the Ohio militia.

In 1812, Morley married Lucy Gunn, with whom he had seven children. Some years after becoming a member of the church in 1830, he practiced plural marriage, taking Leonora Snow (the older sister of Lorenzo and Eliza R. Snow) and Hannah Blakesley (also found as Blaixly or Blakeslee) as his second and third wife in 1844 in Nauvoo, Illinois. He had three children with Blakesley. His other wives included Hannah Knight Libby, Harriet Lucinda Cox, Hannah Sibley, and Nancy Anne Bache (also found as Back).

== Campbellite commune ==
Morley was an early settler in the Western Reserve wilderness area of northern Ohio, and created a productive farm in the region near Kirtland, Ohio. While in this area, he joined the reformed Baptist faith (also known as the Campbellites) under the ministry of Sidney Rigdon. Morley was also the leader of a utopian group that practiced communal principals, holding goods in common for the benefit of all. Members of this group included Lyman Wight and Morley's brother-in-law Titus Billings. Eight additional families joined in 1830. The society was sometimes called the "Morley Family," as Rigdon caused a row of log houses to be built on Morley's farm, where a number of the society's members could live periodically.

== Latter Day Saint movement ==
On November 5, 1830, Morley was baptized into the newly organized Church of Christ by Parley P. Pratt. He had been introduced to the teachings of Smith when Oliver Cowdery and several other missionaries passed through Ohio. He was ordained an elder shortly after his baptism.

When the Latter Day Saints began to settle in Kirtland, Morley opened up his home to them. Joseph Smith and his family lived with Isaac Morley when they first came to Kirtland. Morley later built a small house for them on his farm, where Joseph's and Emma's twins, Thaddeus and Louisa, were born and died only three hours later on April 30, 1831. Isaac's daughter, Lucy, and her elder sister kept house for Emma while she was ill.

Morley was ordained a High Priest on June 4, 1831, by Lyman Wight and was immediately selected for a leadership position. He was ordained on June 6 as First Counselor to Bishop Edward Partridge and served until Partridge's death in 1840.

On June 7, 1831, Morley was asked to sell his farm and act as a missionary while traveling to Independence, Missouri with Ezra Booth (an assignment given to him through Doctrine and Covenants 52:23). Morley and Booth were chastised for lack of obedience three months later in a revelation given in Doctrine and Covenants 64:15–16. Here, Morley faced the violence generated by disagreements and misunderstandings between Mormon settlers and Missouri residents. In July 1833, a mob of about 500 men demolished the home and printing office of William Wines Phelps at Independence and tarred and feathered Bishop Partridge. Morley and five others stepped forward and offered themselves as a ransom for these men. After negotiation, the Missouri citizens agreed to stop the violence and the Mormons agreed to leave the county by April 1, 1834. Morley moved from Jackson County to Clay County with his fellow Latter Day Saints.

Morley left Missouri and returned to Kirtland in early 1835. He was in attendance at the dedication of the Kirtland Temple in March 1836 and was among the first to receive the washing and anointing ordinance, also known as the "initiatory".

In 1835, Morley served a mission with Partridge to the Eastern States. They returned to Kirtland on November 5, 1835. On November 7, Joseph Smith wrote:

The word of the Lord came to me, saying: "Behold I am well pleased with my servant Isaac Morley and my servant Edward Partridge, because of the integrity of their hearts in laboring in my vineyard, for the salvation of the souls of men."

Morley returned to Missouri with his family in early 1836, and helped establish the city of Far West. Then, on November 7, 1837, he was chosen as the patriarch of Far West and ordained under the hands of Joseph Smith, Sidney Rigdon, and Hyrum Smith. He lived in Far West until he was arrested with fifty-five other Mormon citizens on the basis of the Extermination Order of Missouri governor Lilburn W. Boggs. The citizens were taken by the Missouri militia to Richmond, Missouri to await trial. After being held for three weeks, all the prisoners were released by Judge Austin A. King on November 24, 1838.

Upon leaving Missouri with the expelled Saints, Morley settled in Hancock County, Illinois, in a settlement called Yelrome (from the reverse spelling of "Morley"). There, he established a prosperous business as a cooper. In October 1840, Hyrum Smith appointed Morley to serve as president of the stake centered in Lima, Illinois, with John Murdock and Walter Cox as counselors. On April 11, 1845, he was selected to be a member of the Council of Fifty. However, in September 1845, his houses, cooper's shop, property, and grain were burned by a mob, and his family took refuge in the Mormon center of Nauvoo. From there, they moved to Winter Quarters, where Morley's first wife, Lucy, died.

== Utah settlement ==
Morley emigrated to the Great Salt Lake Valley in 1848 with the Church of Jesus Christ of Latter-day Saints (LDS Church) following the death of Joseph Smith, and is considered to be the founder of Manti, Utah. After Ute Indian leader Walkara invited Church president Brigham Young to send Mormon colonists to the Sanpitch (now Sanpete) Valley in central Utah, Young dispatched Morley and James Russell Ivie as leaders of the first company of 225 settlers. Morley and his group felt that part of the purpose of the settlement was to bring the gospel to the Indians. He wrote, "Did we come here to enrich ourselves in the things of this world? No. We were sent to enrich the Natives and comfort the hearts of the long oppressed." (May, p. 104)

Morley and the settlers arrived at the present location of Manti in November 1849, and established a winter camp, digging temporary shelters into the south side of the hill on which the Manti Utah Temple now stands. It was an isolated place, at least four days by wagon from the nearest settlement. Relations between the Mormons and the local Utes were cooperative. The first winter was severe, and, although the settlers were fairly well supplied, they had great difficulties. A measles epidemic broke out and the settlers used their limited medicine to nurse the Utes. When supplies ran low, the Utes helped settlers haul food on sleds through the snow.

Morley encouraged the settlers in their work and assured them that their community would grow to be one of the best in the mountains. The settlers and members of the Ute Sanpitch tribe referred to him affectionately as "Father Morley". Morley supervised the building of the first schoolhouse and the first gristmill in Sanpete Valley. The Sanpete Valley settlement grew and prospered and became known as a prime agricultural area.

Morley served as a senator in the general assembly of the provisional State of Deseret. He represented Sanpete county in the Utah territorial legislature from 1851 to 1857.

During his last years, Morley spent most of his time on his calling as a patriarch, conferring priesthood blessings on thousands of church members. He died on June 24, 1865, in Fairview, Utah.

On a wall inside the Manti Utah Temple is a framed piece of temple clothing used by Morley in the Nauvoo Temple when he was endowed there.

== See also ==
- Fountain Green Massacre

Church of Jesus Christ of Latter Day Saints titles
New title	First Counselor to the Bishop of the Church; February 4, 1831 – May 27, 1840	Position Vacant: May 27, 1840 – October 7, 1844; Succeeded by: George Miller as Second Bishop of the Church
