= Edward Partridge Jr. =

American politician (1833-1900)

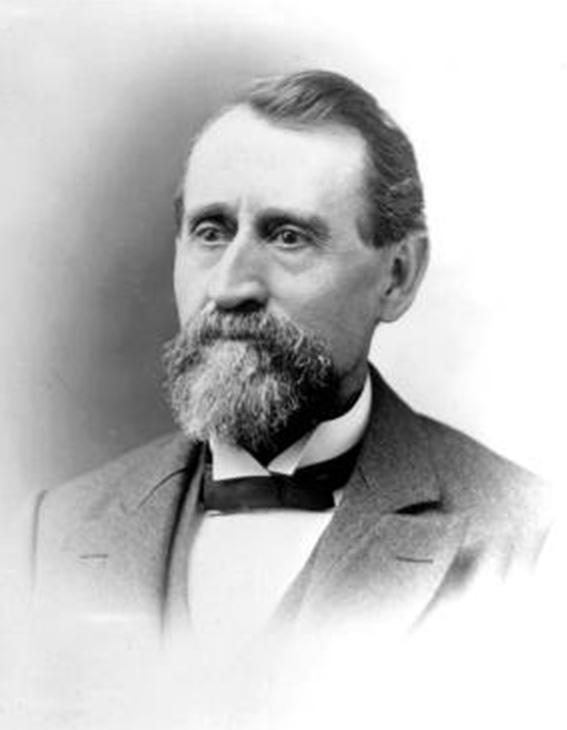

Member of the 7th Utah Territorial Legislature

In office
- 1873 – 1858

Personal details
- Born: June 25, 1833; Independence, Missouri, United States
- Died: November 17, 1900 (aged 67); Provo, Utah, United States
- Resting place: Provo City Cemetery; 40.225°N 111.644°W

Edward Partridge Jr. (June 25, 1833 – November 17, 1900) was a member of the Utah Territorial Legislature, the Utah State Constitutional Convention, and president of the Utah Stake of the Church of Jesus Christ of Latter-day Saints (LDS Church) when the stake included all of Utah County, Utah.

Partridge was the son of Edward Partridge, the first Presiding Bishop of The Church of Jesus Christ of Latter-day Saints, and his wife Lydia. Partridge was born in Independence, Missouri, and was less than a year old when the Latter-day Saints were driven out of that place. The family moved to Clay County, Missouri, then Caldwell County, Missouri, and then to Nauvoo, Illinois, where Partridge's father died when young Edward was about seven.

Partridge arrived in Utah in 1848 and then was called on a mission to Hawaii in 1854, where he remained until 1857. In 1858, Partridge married Sarah Lucretia Clayton, a daughter of William Clayton. He later moved to Farmington, Utah, where he ran Amasa M. Lyman's (the husband of one of his sister's) farm.

In 1864, Partridge moved to Fillmore, Utah, where he was called to serve as bishop in the Church. In 1877, he became a counselor to Ira N. Hinckley in the presidency of the Millard Stake which was headquartered in Fillmore. From 1882 to 1885, Partridge served as president of the Hawaiian Mission of the church.

Partridge then moved to Provo so his children could study at Brigham Young Academy. He served as a counselor to Abraham O. Smoot in the Utah Stake Presidency from 1892 to 1895 and then served as president of the Utah Stake from 1895 until his own death five years later.

Partridge had married Elizabeth Buxton as a second wife in 1862. He had a total of 17 children, only 12 of whom outlived him.
