= Orrin Miller =

Orrin Miller may refer to:

- Orrin Larrabee Miller (1856–1926), member of the United States House of Representatives from Kansas
- Orrin P. Miller (1858–1918), member of the presiding bishopric of The Church of Jesus Christ of Latter-day Saints
