= Orrin P. Miller =

American religious leader (1858–1918)

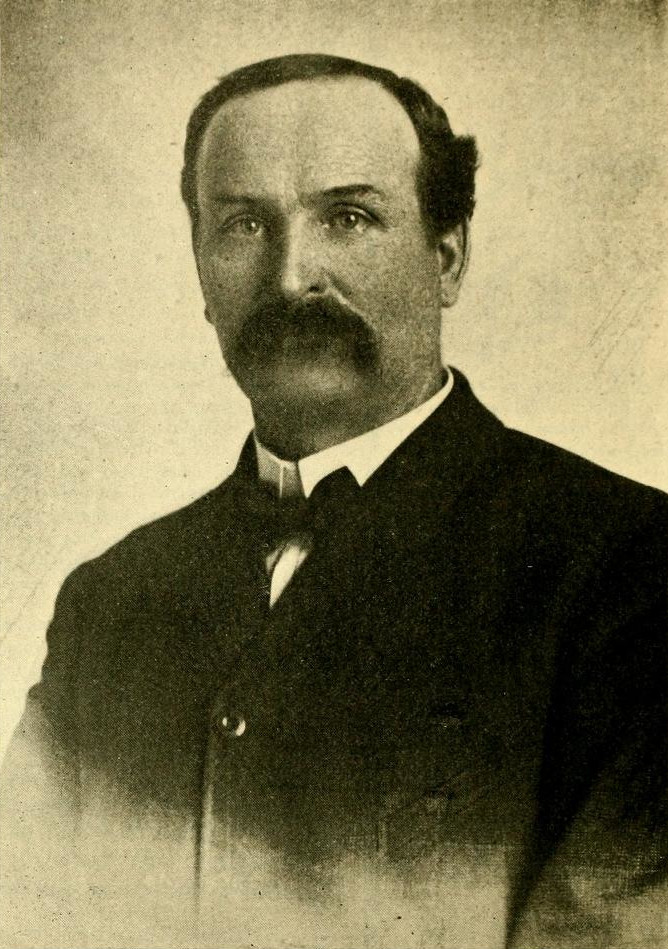

First Counselor in the Presiding Bishopric
- December 4, 1907 – July 7, 1918

Second Counselor in the Presiding Bishopric
- October 24, 1901 – December 4, 1907
- End reason: Honorable release of William B. Preston and his counselors

Personal details
- Born: Orrin Porter Miller; September 11, 1858; Millcreek, Utah Territory
- Died: July 7, 1918 (aged 59); Salt Lake City, Utah, United States

Orrin Porter Miller (September 11, 1858 – July 7, 1918) was a member of the presiding bishopric of the Church of Jesus Christ of Latter-day Saints (LDS Church) from 1901 to his death.

Born in Millcreek, Utah Territory, Miller was a local leader in the church prior to his call as a general authority. He became the bishop of the newly created Riverton Ward in Salt Lake City in 1886. Prior to serving as a bishop, he had been an elder and a seventy in the church. In 1900, when the Salt Lake Stake of the church was divided in two, Miller was selected as the first president of the new Jordan Stake.

In 1901, Miller was selected as the second counselor to presiding bishop William B. Preston. Miller was replacing John R. Winder, who had earlier been asked to become a member of the First Presidency of the church. Miller served as Preston's counselor until Preston resigned due to ill health in 1907. Charles W. Nibley became the new presiding bishop, and he asked Miller to become his first counselor. Miller served as Nibley's first counselor until he died of stomach cancer in Salt Lake City at the age of 59.

== See also ==
- Council on the Disposition of the Tithes
- David A. Smith (Mormon)
- Robert T. Burton

== Notes ==
The Church of Jesus Christ of Latter-day Saints titles
Preceded by Robert T. Burton	First Counselor in the Presiding Bishopric; December 4, 1907 – July 7, 1918	Succeeded by David A. Smith
Preceded by John R. Winder	Second Counselor in the Presiding Bishopric; October 24, 1901 – December 4, 1907	Succeeded by David A. Smith
