= Presiding Bishop (LDS Church) =

LDS Church leader

The presiding bishop of the Church of Jesus Christ of Latter-day Saints (LDS Church) is a senior priesthood leader responsible for administering the temporal affairs of the LDS Church. As the highest office within the Aaronic priesthood, the Presiding Bishop oversees matters including church finances, properties, welfare and humanitarian programs, and the administration of local bishoprics. He and his two counselors, collectively known as the Presiding Bishopric, together with the First Presidency and the Quorum of the Twelve Apostles make up the church's Council on the Disposition of the Tithes, which authorizes the use of church funds. The presiding bishop is the highest leadership position within the church's Aaronic priesthood, although most of the work in this area is delegated to the church's Young Men general presidency. The church's current Presiding Bishop is W. Christopher Waddell.

== Duties ==
The primary duties of the Presiding Bishopric are to oversee the temporal affairs (buildings, properties, commercial corporations, etc.) of the church and to oversee the bishoprics of congregations throughout the world. Along with the First Presidency and Quorum of the Twelve Apostles, the Presiding Bishopric is a part of the Council on the Disposition of the Tithes, a group that oversees and authorizes the expenditure of all tithing funds. The Presiding Bishopric is also responsible for overseeing the church's Aaronic priesthood, although most of the work in this area is delegated to the Young Men general presidency.

The Presiding Bishopric holds the power to join with twelve high priests of the church in convening the Common Council of the Church, the only body of the church which may discipline or remove the President of the Church or one of his counselors in the First Presidency. However, the Common Council has only been convened twice in the history of the LDS Church, and only once has it disciplined a First Presidency member, when Sidney Rigdon was excommunicated in absentia, in 1844.

== History ==
=== Possible other Presiding Bishop ===
According to Orson Pratt and John Taylor, Vinson Knight was made the presiding bishop, with Samuel H. Smith and Shadrach Roundy as assistants, on January 19, 1841. However, the LDS Church does not include Vinson Knight in its list of presiding bishops but considers Knight the "third general bishop of the Church."

=== Chronology of the Presiding Bishopric ===
| No. | Dates | Presiding Bishop | First Counselor | | Second Counselor | |
|---|---|---|---|---|---|---|
| 1 | February 4, 1831 – May 27, 1840 | Edward Partridge ("Bishop") | Isaac Morley (June 6, 1831 – May 27, 1840) | | John Corrill (June 6, 1831 – August 1, 1837); Titus Billings (August 1, 1837 – May 27, 1840) | Billings |
| | May 27, 1840 – October 7, 1844 | None sustained | | | | |
| | October 7, 1844 – April 6, 1847 | Newel K. Whitney ("First Bishop of the Church") | Reynolds Cahoon (1832–?); George Miller ("Second Bishop of the Church") (October 7, 1844 – latter end of 1846) | Cahoon | | |
| 2 | April 6, 1847 – September 23, 1850 | Newel K. Whitney ("Presiding Bishop") | None | | | |
| 3 | April 7, 1851 – October 16, 1883 | Edward Hunter | Leonard W. Hardy (October 6, 1856 – October 16, 1883) | | Jesse C. Little (October 6, 1856 – Summer 1874); Robert T. Burton (October 9, 1874 – October 16, 1883) | Little Burton |
| 4 | April 6, 1884 – December 4, 1907 | William B. Preston | Leonard W. Hardy (April 6, 1884 – July 31, 1884); Robert T. Burton (October 5, 1884 – November 11, 1907) | Hardy Burton | Robert T. Burton (April 6, 1884 – October 5, 1884); John Q. Cannon (October 5, 1884 – September 5, 1886); John R. Winder (April 8, 1887 – October 17, 1901); Orrin P. Miller (October 24, 1901 – December 4, 1907) | Cannon Winder Miller |
| 5 | December 4, 1907 – May 28, 1925 | Charles W. Nibley | Orrin P. Miller (December 4, 1907 – July 7, 1918); David A. Smith (July 18, 1918 – May 28, 1925) | Miller Smith | David A. Smith (December 4, 1907 – July 7, 1918); John Wells (July 18, 1918 – May 28, 1925) | Smith Wells |
| 6 | June 4, 1925 – April 6, 1938 | Sylvester Q. Cannon | David A. Smith | | John Wells | |
| 7 | April 6, 1938 – April 6, 1952 | LeGrand Richards | Marvin O. Ashton (April 6, 1938 – October 7, 1946); Joseph L. Wirthlin (December 12, 1946 – April 6, 1952) | Ashton Wirthlin | Joseph L. Wirthlin (April 6, 1938 – October 7, 1946); Thorpe B. Isaacson (December 12, 1946 – April 6, 1952) | Wirthlin Isaacson |
| 8 | April 6, 1952 – September 30, 1961 | Joseph L. Wirthlin | Thorpe B. Isaacson | | Carl W. Buehner | |
| 9 | September 30, 1961 – April 6, 1972 | John H. Vandenberg | Robert L. Simpson | | Victor L. Brown | |
| 10 | April 6, 1972 – April 6, 1985 | Victor L. Brown | H. Burke Peterson | | Vaughn J Featherstone (April 6, 1972 – October 1, 1976); J. Richard Clarke (October 1, 1976 – April 6, 1985) | |
| 11 | April 6, 1985 – April 2, 1994 | Robert D. Hales | Henry B. Eyring (April 6, 1985 – October 3, 1992); H. David Burton (October 3, 1992 – April 2, 1994) | Eyring | Glenn L. Pace (April 6, 1985 – October 3, 1992); Richard C. Edgley (October 3, 1992 – April 2, 1994) | |
| 12 | April 2, 1994 – December 27, 1995 | Merrill J. Bateman | H. David Burton | | Richard C. Edgley | |
| 13 | December 27, 1995 – March 31, 2012 | H. David Burton | Richard C. Edgley | | Keith B. McMullin | |
| 14 | March 31, 2012 – October 9, 2015 | Gary E. Stevenson | Gérald Caussé | | Dean M. Davies | |
| 15 | October 9, 2015 – November 14, 2025 | Gérald Caussé | Dean M. Davies (October 9, 2015 – October 3, 2020) W. Christopher Waddell (October 3, 2020 – November 14, 2025) | | W. Christopher Waddell (October 9, 2015 – October 3, 2020) L. Todd Budge (October 3, 2020 – November 14, 2025) | |
| 16 | November 14, 2025 – present | W. Christopher Waddell | L. Todd Budge (November 14, 2025 – present) | | Sean Douglas (November 14, 2025 – present) | |
