= Jesse C. Little =

Mormon pioneer (1815–1893)

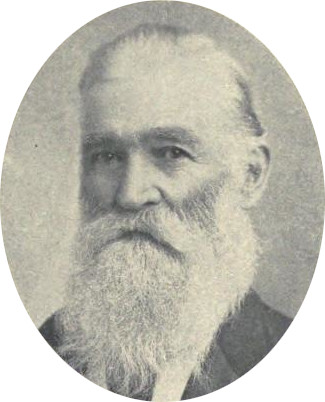

Second Counselor in the Presiding Bishopric
- October 6, 1856 – Summer 1874
- Called by: Edward Hunter
- End reason: Resignation

Personal details
- Born: Jesse Carter Little; September 26, 1815; Belmont, Massachusetts, United States
- Died: December 26, 1893 (aged 78); Salt Lake City, Utah Territory, United States
- Resting place: Salt Lake City Cemetery; 40.777°N 111.858°W
- Spouse(s): Elizabeth G. French; Mary M. Holbrook; Emily Hoagland
- Children: 27
- Parents: Thomas and Relief Little

Jesse Carter Little (September 26, 1815 – December 26, 1893) was a Mormon pioneer and a member of the presiding bishopric of the Church of Jesus Christ of Latter-day Saints (LDS Church).

Little was born in Belmont, Maine. He was educated at Ipswich Academy in New Hampshire and served as a school teacher for a year near Peterborough, New Hampshire. He was a farmer, blacksmith, and sleigh and wagon builder. He worked as a clerk in a dry good store in Boston, and later he and Leonard Hardy had a store in Peterborough.

In 1845, Little was taught by Latter Day Saint missionary Eli P. Maginn; he was baptized into the LDS Church and in 1846 was made a president of the church's missions in the eastern United States.

In 1846, Little met with United States President James K. Polk and former Post Master General, Amos Kendall asking for help for the emigrating members of the LDS church to the west. During this time, Little was advised by Thomas L. Kane, a Pennsylvania lawyer. When help was not forthcoming, Little wrote a letter to Polk saying he would go across the trackless ocean for help if none was provided by the United States. This resulted in a call for a battalion of Mormons for the war against Mexico. Once he was promised this help, Little traveled from Washington, D.C., to Nauvoo, Illinois, and from there to Omaha, Nebraska. While Little was traveling to the Mormon camp, Colonel Kearney, commander of Fort Leavenworth, was authorized to create the battalion and sent Captain James Allen to recruit the Mormon Battalion. Little was the liaison for the LDS Church with Kane when he became involved in assisting the church in its relations with the U.S. government.

In 1847, Little served as adjutant to Brigham Young who led a company of Mormon pioneers from Winter Quarters, Nebraska, to the Salt Lake Valley. Shortly after arriving in Salt Lake City, Little returned to the eastern United States and continued to act as a mission president. Little's tenure as mission president ended in 1852, and he moved to Utah Territory.

In Salt Lake City he served as an attorney, sexton, marshal, tax appraiser, military officer and fire chief. From 1855 to 1859, he served four terms in the House of Representatives of the Utah Territorial Legislature.

On October 6, 1856, Little became the second counselor to the presiding bishop of the LDS Church, Edward Hunter. Little acted in this capacity until his resignation in the summer of 1874; he was eventually replaced in the presiding bishopric by Robert T. Burton.

In the 1880s, Little corresponded extensively with Samuel Brannan in an effort to promote a colony and mining enterprise Brannan sought to establish in Sonora, Mexico.

Little moved to Morgan County, Utah, and lived in Littleton, a town that was named after him which he had helped establish. He died in Salt Lake City, Utah Territory, and was buried at Salt Lake City Cemetery.

Like many early members of the LDS Church, Little practiced plural marriage. He had three wives and 27 children.

== Notes ==
The Church of Jesus Christ of Latter-day Saints titles
Position Vacant; May 27, 1840 – April 7, 1851; Preceded by Titus Billings as Second Counselor to the Bishop of the Church of the Church of Jesus Christ of Latter Day Saints	Second Counselor in the Presiding Bishopric; October 6, 1856 – Summer 1874	Succeeded by Robert T. Burton
