= John Q. Cannon =

Newspaper editor

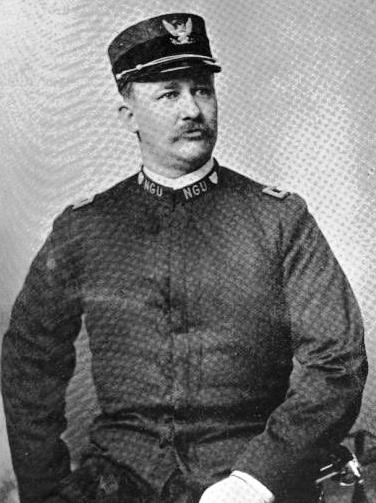

Second Counselor in the Presiding Bishopric
- October 5, 1884 – September 5, 1886
- Called by: William B. Preston
- End reason: Excommunicated for adultery

Personal details
- Born: John Quayle Cannon; April 19, 1857; San Francisco, California, United States
- Died: January 14, 1931 (aged 73); Salt Lake City, Utah, United States
- Spouse(s): Elizabeth Ann "Annie" Wells
- Children: 12
- Parents: George Q. Cannon; Elizabeth Hoagland

John Quayle Cannon (April 19, 1857 – January 14, 1931) was an editor-in-chief of the Deseret News in Salt Lake City, Utah, and a general authority of the Church of Jesus Christ of Latter-day Saints (LDS Church). He also served as a lieutenant colonel in the United States Army during the Spanish–American War. He was the son of LDS Church apostle George Q. Cannon and Elizabeth Hoagland. He was married to Elizabeth "Annie" Wells Cannon. Cannon is one of the few general authorities of the LDS Church to have been excommunicated.

== Newspaper editor ==
From 1889 until 1892, Cannon was the editor of the Ogden Standard. From October 1892 until April 1898, he was the editor in chief of the Deseret News. After the Spanish–American War he returned to work at the Deseret News and served as an executive editor of the newspaper off-and-on until his death. He was much beloved by his co-workers.

Cannon was a member of the Utah Society of the Sons of the American Revolution.

== General authority and controversy ==
Cannon was the oldest son of George Q. Cannon and the one most expected to follow in his prominent father's footsteps in politics, church office, and journalism. Heber J. Grant once said of Cannon: "There probably is not a young man in the church who had had more opportunities and advantages extended to him educationally, spiritually, and every other way than John Q. Cannon." At the age of 27, Cannon was called to serve as the Second Counselor to William B. Preston, the Presiding Bishop of the LDS Church; he served in this position between 1884 and 1886.

In 1884, shortly after Cannon had become a general authority, a sensationalized news story by Joseph Lippman in the Salt Lake Tribune alleged that Cannon had taken his wife's sister Louie Wells as a plural wife. Lippman suggested that Cannon and Wells had been married in the Logan Temple. In fact, there had been no such marriage, though it was later revealed that Cannon and Wells had begun having an affair around this time. Cannon confronted Lippman in downtown Salt Lake City and demanded a retraction of the story. When Lippman refused to apologize or to issue a retraction, Cannon punched Lippman and beat him with a whip. Cannon pleaded guilty to the assault and paid a small fine. Cannon, who was city editor for the Deseret News at the time, almost certainly wrote the article about the confrontation between himself and Lippman.

On September 5, 1886, Cannon was released from the Presiding Bishopric and excommunicated from the church after he confessed in public at the traditional Sunday meeting in the Salt Lake Tabernacle that he and Louie Wells had committed adultery. He was excommunicated from the pulpit by his uncle, Salt Lake Stake President Angus M. Cannon. Because Louie Wells was pregnant by Cannon, George Q. Cannon instructed Cannon's wife Annie Wells Cannon to divorce so that he could marry Louie Wells. After the divorce, Cannon and Louie Wells were married by his brother, Abraham H. Cannon.

However, after Cannon and Wells were married, he was criminally charged with the crimes of polygamy and unlawful cohabitation, largely based on the earlier rumors that had been promoted by Lippman's article. Cannon and Wells acknowledged that prior to their marriage they had considered plural marriage, but had decided against it. After being humiliated in a preliminary hearing in which she had to testify, Louie Wells went to San Francisco to live with her half-sister and brother-in-law, Belle Whitney and Septimus Sears. There, Wells delivered a stillborn baby boy and died a month later from complications of the childbirth. Her mother, Emmeline Wells, was broken-hearted.

Cannon later remarried Annie Wells and they had nine more children. He was readmitted into the church by baptism on May 6, 1888; however, he never regained his position as a general authority of the church. In the early 1890s, Cannon and Louie Wells were sealed in the Manti Temple in a posthumous, vicarious ordinance, with Annie Wells standing in for her sister.

== Military service ==
During the Spanish–American War, Cannon served as the lieutenant colonel (i.e., second-in-command) of the 2nd United States Volunteer Cavalry.

Cannon was a member of the Sons of the Revolution and the Sons of the American Revolution.

== Death ==
Cannon died of myocarditis in Salt Lake City, Utah. He was buried at Salt Lake City Cemetery.

== Notes ==
The Church of Jesus Christ of Latter-day Saints titles
Preceded by Robert T. Burton	Second Counselor in the Presiding Bishopric; October 5, 1884 – September 5, 1886	Succeeded by John R. Winder
