= Wilford, Idaho =

Unincorporated community in the state of Idaho, United States

Coordinates: 43°54′46″N 111°40′40″W

Wilford is an unincorporated community in Fremont County, in the U.S. state of Idaho.

== History ==
The first settlement at Wilford was made in 1883. Wilford was officially founded by Thomas Smith. A post office called Wilford was established in 1887, and remained in operation until 1905. The community was named after Leonard Wilford Hardy, a Mormon leader.

In June 1976, most of the buildings in Wilford were swept away by a flood that resulted from the catastrophic failure of the recently built Teton Dam. Soon after the dam's failure it was reported that "154 [Wilford] houses were intact or in pieces, riding the fifteen-mile-an-hour crest" of the flood.

Five residents of Wilford died in the flood.
