= Leonard W. Hardy =

American Mormon pioneer (1805–1884)

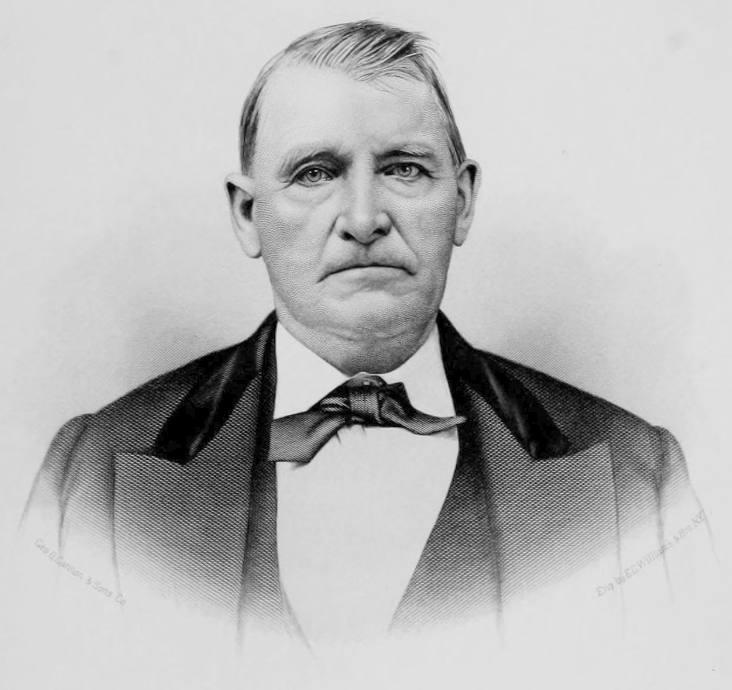

First Counselor in the Presiding Bishopric
- October 6, 1856 – July 31, 1884

Personal details
- Born: Leonard Wilford Hardy; December 31, 1805; Bradford, Massachusetts, United States
- Died: July 31, 1884 (aged 78); Salt Lake City, Utah Territory, United States
- Resting place: Salt Lake City Cemetery; 40.777°N 111.858°W
- Spouse(s): Elizabeth Harriman Nichols; Sophia Lois Goodridge; Esther Smilinda Goodridge; Harriet Ann Goodridge; Rachel Smith Gardner
- Children: 18
- Parents: Simon Hardy; Rhoda Hardy
- Signature
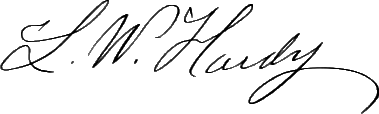

Leonard Wilford Hardy (December 31, 1805 – July 31, 1884) was an early convert in the Latter Day Saint movement, a Mormon pioneer and a member of the presiding bishopric of the Church of Jesus Christ of Latter-day Saints (LDS Church) from 1856 until his death.

== Biography ==
Hardy was born in Bradford, Massachusetts on December 31, 1805. On December 2, 1832, he joined the Church of Jesus Christ of Latter Day Saints, being baptized by missionary Orson Hyde.

In December 1844, Hardy traveled to England as a church missionary with Wilford Woodruff, Dan Jones, and Hiram Clark. Hardy was stationed in Preston, Lancashire, and was made the conference president in March 1845.

After returning to the United States, Hardy and his family emigrated to Utah Territory with other Mormon pioneers in 1850. Hardy contracted cholera but survived.

In Utah, Hardy was made a bishop of two different wards. On October 12, 1856, Hardy was called to be the first counselor to the church's Presiding Bishop, Edward Hunter. When Hunter died in 1883, William B. Preston became the new presiding bishop and Hardy was again selected as the first counselor. However, after just a few months working under Preston, Hardy died at his home in Salt Lake City and was buried at Salt Lake City Cemetery.

Hardy practiced plural marriage and was the father of 18 children. Among his five wives were three sisters, Sophia Lois, Esther Smylinda, and Harriet Ann Goodridge (name also shown as Goodrich in some sources). His other two wives were Elizabeth Harriman Nichols and Rachel Smith Gardner.

Leonard Wilford Hardy is the namesake of the community of Wilford, Idaho.

== Notes ==
The Church of Jesus Christ of Latter-day Saints titles
Position Vacant; April 6, 1847 – September 23, 1850; Preceded by: George Miller as Second Bishop of the Church	First Counselor in the Presiding Bishopric; October 6, 1856 – July 31, 1884	Succeeded by Robert T. Burton
