= Annie Wells Cannon =

American politician (1859–1942)

- Born: Elizabeth Ann Wells; December 7, 1859; Salt Lake City, Utah
- Died: September 2, 1942 (aged 82); Salt Lake City, Utah
- Other name: Annie Wells Cannon
- Education: Deseret University
- Occupation: Politician
- Spouse: John Quayle Cannon (m. 1879–1931) (his death)

Elizabeth Ann Wells Cannon (December 7, 1859 – September 2, 1942), generally known as Annie Wells Cannon, was a prominent women's suffragist in Utah who served in the Utah House of Representatives from 1913 to 1915 and again in 1921. She was also president of the Daughters of Utah Pioneers and a charter member of the Utah Red Cross.

== Early life ==
Elizabeth Ann "Annie" Wells was born in Salt Lake City, Utah, on December 7, 1859, the daughter of General Daniel Hammer Wells (1814-1891) and Emmeline Blanche Woodward (1828-1921). She had 29 siblings.

She attended the Deseret University.

== Career ==
Elizabeth Wells Cannon worked for fifteen years as a reporter and assistant editor for the Woman's Exponent, a Utah Suffrage paper published and edited by her mother Emmeline B. Wells, and she contributed verse and prose to various magazines and newspapers.

She was a member of House of Representatives, an author of measures for social welfare and art.

She was the director of the Library Board.

She was a member of the Board of Directors of the American Relief Association, national historian and twice state president of the Service Star Legion, and honorary member for Utah for the National Woman's Relief Society. In 1883 she wrote The History and Objectives of the Relief Society and co-authored the Relief Society Handbook. She was chosen by Herbert Hoover to be Utah's chairman for the European Relief Drive.

In 1918 she was associate vice-president of the American Flag Association.

She was a member of the Daughters of Utah Pioneers, the American Woman's Association, the Utah Woman's Press Club, the Order of Bookfellows.

== Personal life ==
In 1879 Elizabeth Wells married Col. John Quayle Cannon (1857-1931). They lived in Salt Lake City, Utah, finally settling at 1354 South 9th West; and had twelve children, eleven of whom lived to adulthood, and three of whom served in World War I:

1. George Quayle Cannon (1881-1967)
2. Louise Blanche Cannon (Andrew) (1884-1967)
3. Margaret Cannon (Clayton) (1886-1977)
4. Daniel Hoagland Cannon (1889-1954)
5. Eleanor Addy Cannon (1891-1892)
6. Emmeline Cannon (Martineau) (1893-1972)
7. Cavendish Wells Cannon (1895-1962)
8. Katherine Cannon (McKay) (1897-1947)
9. David Woodward Cannon (1899-1973)
10. Abraham Hoagland Cannon (1899-1992)
11. John Quayle Cannon (1901-1980)
12. Theodore Lincoln Cannon (1904-1966)

Elizabeth died in Salt Lake City, of Hodgkin's lymphoma, and is buried at Salt Lake City Cemetery.

== Publications ==
- "Zina Young Card". Relief Society Magazine. 18 (4): 202–204. April 1931.
