= John R. Winder =

First Counselor in the First Presidency under Joseph F. Smith

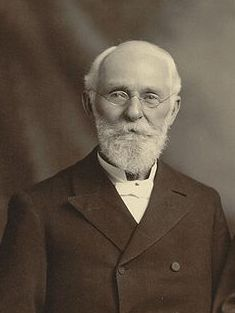
- Winder in 1901

First Counselor in the First Presidency
- October 17, 1901 – March 27, 1910
- Predecessor: Joseph F. Smith
- Successor: Anthon H. Lund
- Reason: Reorganization of First Presidency after death of Lorenzo Snow
- Reorganization at end of term: John Henry Smith added to the First Presidency; Joseph Fielding Smith ordained an Apostle

Second Counselor in the Presiding Bishopric
- April 8, 1887 – October 17, 1901
- Predecessor: John Q. Cannon
- Successor: Orrin P. Miller
- Reason: Excommunication of John Q. Cannon
- End reason: Called as First Counselor in First Presidency

Personal details
- Born: John Rex Winder; December 11, 1821; Biddenden, Kent, England
- Died: March 27, 1910 (aged 88); Salt Lake City, Utah, United States
- Resting place: Salt Lake City Cemetery; 40.777°N 111.858°W
- Spouse(s): Ellen Walters; Hannah Thompson; Elizabeth Parker; Maria Burnham
- Children: 20
- Signature
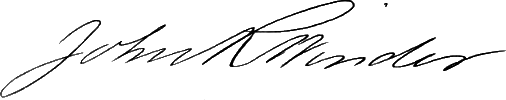

John Rex Winder (/ˈwɪndər/; December 11, 1821 – March 27, 1910) was a leader and general authority of the Church of Jesus Christ of Latter-day Saints (LDS Church). He was Second Counselor in the Presiding Bishopric from 1887 to 1901, and First Counselor in the First Presidency to church president Joseph F. Smith from 1901 until his death. He was well known for his business abilities, and influenced Heber J. Grant. He was also active in politics and the militia, participating in the Utah War and the Black Hawk War (Utah). When the church came under heavy government pressure for its practice of plural marriage, Winder held the church's assets to keep them from being seized by the federal government. He was a polygamist and had four wives and 20 children.

== Early life ==
Winder was born to Richard and Sophia Collins Winder in Biddenden, England. He worked in several trades as a youth, settling into a position as a shoe and leather man in his twenties in London. There he married Ellen Walters in 1845. There also he was recruited to manage a shoe store in Liverpool.

In the shoe store, he discovered the LDS Church and joined as a member. In February 1853, he and his wife set out to Utah to join the church there. He traveled across the Atlantic Ocean, nearly succumbing to smallpox on the way. He then traveled via steamboat up the Mississippi River to St. Louis, Missouri, where he caught another boat leading up to Keokuk, Iowa. From there he traveled with a company of members heading towards Utah Territory under Joseph W. Young. They arrived on October 10, 1853.

== Utah life ==
Engaged in leather work, Winder was quite successful in several ventures. His business sense became recognized and eventually he found seats on several corporate boards. Of his ventures, one remains today: Winder Dairy. Winder was generous with his wealth: The poor, orphans, and widows benefited greatly from his efforts.

Winder also became a figure in politics and the militia in the territory. He led the Nauvoo Legion to stop the advance of Johnston's Army in the Utah War of 1857. In the Black Hawk War (Utah), he fought as Adjutant General. He was the chief aid to General Daniel H. Wells, and wrote up the expense report submitted to congress at the conclusion of the conflict.

Winder also served as chairman of the People's Party. His efforts to modernize the exercise of politics in the territory led from the church-dominated system to a two-party system much like the national political system. Serving as a delegate to several state constitutional conventions, he was an instrument in Utah Territory achieving statehood.

== General authority ==
LDS Church president John Taylor called Winder to serve as Second Counselor to Presiding Bishop William B. Preston on April 8, 1887. During this time, the federal government began to put more pressure on the church for its practice of plural marriage. After the passage of the Edmunds–Tucker Act in 1887, church leaders went into hiding and church assets were distributed to be kept from being seized. Winder assisted many people on the run from the federal government, by helping to hide them or to post bail. His poplar farm on the south of the city served as a temporary church headquarters for Taylor.

In 1890, church president Wilford Woodruff approached Winder, Charles W. Penrose, and George Reynolds to review and edit the manuscript of the Manifesto. With the publication and announcement of the Manifesto, federal pressure was alleviated.

Another significant contribution of Winder during his tenure as Second Counselor in the Presiding Bishopric was his work on the interior of the Salt Lake Temple. He managed the interior work to be done, and completed it much ahead of schedule. That earned him praise from leaders of the church. After the dedication, Winder served as First Assistant to temple president Lorenzo Snow. Winder remained in the presidency of the temple until his death.

Winder was called to the First Presidency as First Counselor to church president Joseph F. Smith on October 17, 1901. One of the notable efforts of that administration was the legal fight to get Reed Smoot seated as a U.S. senator in the Smoot Hearings. In 1909, the First Presidency published a proclamation called "The Origin of Man", which clarified the church's position on human evolution and reaffirmed that men are the children of God and were created by him.

== Apostle? ==
Having never been a member of the Quorum of the Twelve Apostles prior to his call to the First Presidency, a situation which is a rarity in the LDS Church, there has been some dispute as to whether or not Winder was ordained an apostle at the time of his appointment to the First Presidency. The LDS Church has no record of Winder being ordained to the priesthood office of apostle.

== Family life ==
Winder married Ellen Walters in London in 1845. A practitioner of plural marriage, Winder married Hannah Thompson in Salt Lake City in 1855, Elizabeth Parker in 1857, and later, Maria Burnham in 1893. Through the first three women he fathered 23 children.

Maria Burnham was from Fruitland, New Mexico Territory, where the LDS Church congregation was named the Burnham Ward because of her family's prominence in the early history of the area.

== Death ==
Winder died in Salt Lake City, Utah, of pneumonia. He was buried at Salt Lake City Cemetery. Anthon H. Lund succeeded him as First Counselor in the First Presidency.

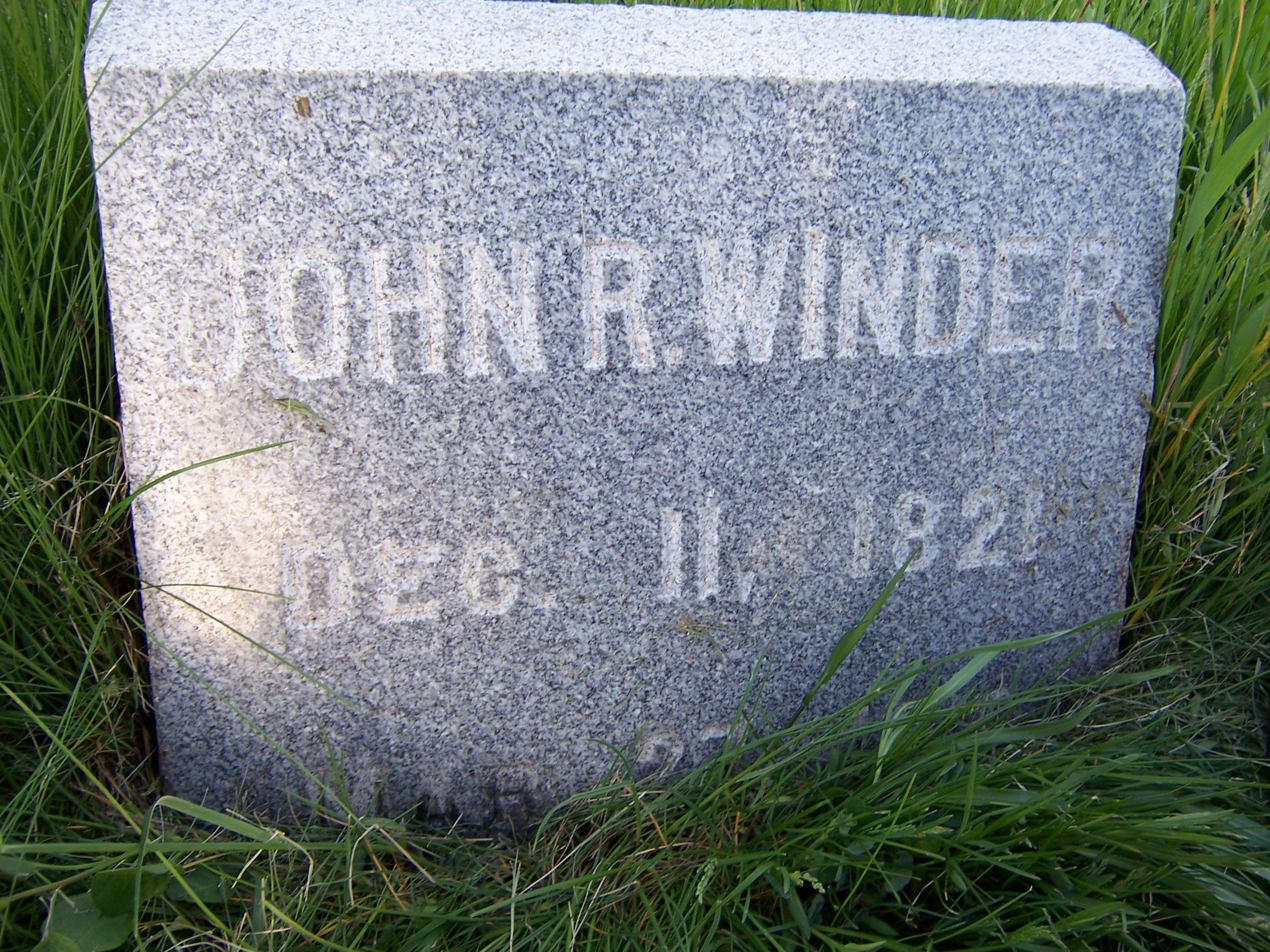
Headstone of John R. Winder

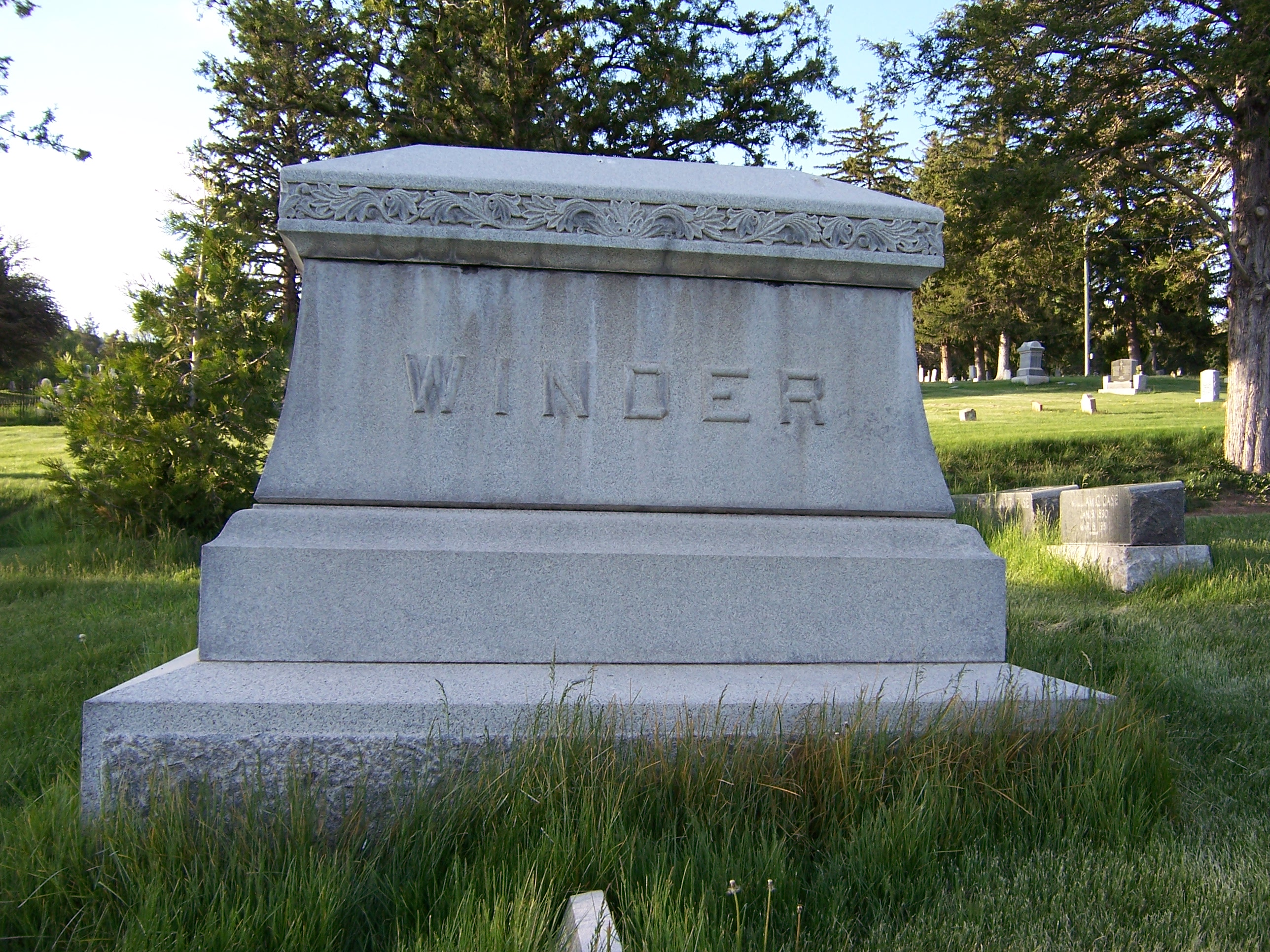
Family monument of John R. Winder

== See also ==
- Winder (surname)

== Bibliography ==
- Michael K. Winder (1999). John R. Winder: Member of the First Presidency, Pioneer, Temple Builder, Dairyman. Horizon Publishers. ISBN 0-88290-676-3.

== Notes ==
The Church of Jesus Christ of Latter-day Saints titles
Preceded by Joseph F. Smith	First Counselor in the First Presidency; October 17, 1901 – March 27, 1910	Succeeded by Anthon H. Lund
Preceded by John Q. Cannon	Second Counselor in the Presiding Bishopric; April 8, 1887 – October 17, 1901	Succeeded by Orrin P. Miller
