= Winder Farms =

- Type: Private
- Founded: 1880; 146 years ago
- Founder: John R. Winder
- Key people: Dan Verrinder (President)
- Website: www.winderfarms.com

Winder Farms is an American dairy company. It offers milk and chocolate milk, and other products, formerly delivering to households in Utah, Las Vegas, Nevada and Orange County, California.

== History ==
In 1863, the Winder family built the first Winder farm at 2700 South and 300 East in Salt Lake City, Utah. In 1880, the Winder's business, known then as Winder Dairy, began delivering milk. Glass bottles of "Rich Jersey Milk" were introduced in 1907. The price of a quart of Winder milk in 1918 was 18 cents.

The family switched from horses to a Ford Model T truck in 1915, but when its tires frequently burst, the Winders went back to horse deliveries until 1928. In 1931, the farm moved from South Salt Lake City to 4400 W. 4100 South. The family started its bakery operation in 1958. In 1985, glass bottles were replaced with polycarbonate containers. Home deliveries ceased in 2019 and the plant in West Valley City closed down.

== Expansion ==
In 2006, Winder Farms expanded into Las Vegas and Mesquite, Nevada. In 2013, Winder Farms acquired a Santa Ana-based grocery home delivery service for an undisclosed price.

== Place in industry ==
While Winder Farms began as a traditional milkman, similar to Oberweis Dairy, its expansion into categories beyond dairy, along with its shift to orders primarily made online, place it more in the online grocer industry. The home delivery side of the business was discontinued in 2019.

== Market Change ==
After home delivery ceased in the summer of 2019, and the lease of the property of its West Valley City headquarters and plant was coming up, the decision was made to move operations and offices to an industrial area near 1800 South and 3200 West within West Valley City.
