= Titus Billings =

American Mormon leader (1793–1866)

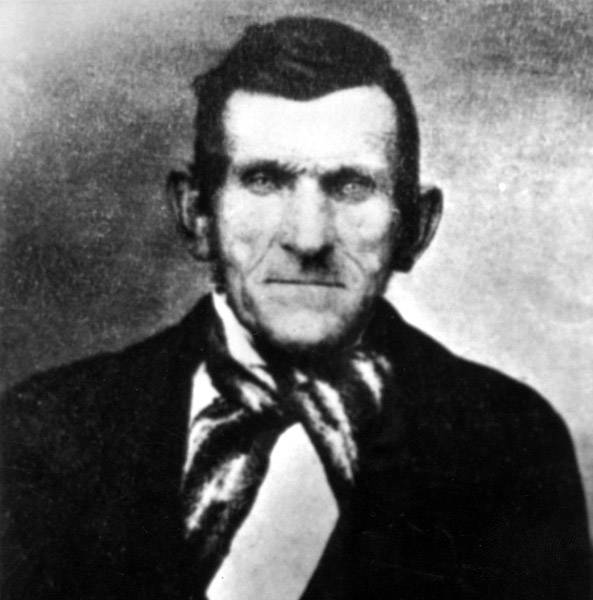

Second Counselor to the Bishop of the Church
- August 1, 1837 – May 27, 1840
- Called by: Edward Partridge
- End reason: Honorably released at the death of Edward Partridge

Personal details
- Born: March 25, 1793; Greenfield, Massachusetts, United States
- Died: February 6, 1866 (aged 72); Provo, Utah Territory, United States
- Resting place: Provo City Cemetery; 40.225°N 111.6444°W
- Spouse(s): Mary Ann Tuttle; Diantha Morley
- Children: 13

Titus Billings (March 25, 1793 – February 6, 1866) was an early convert to the Latter Day Saint movement. He served in several positions in the church and was a contemporary of Joseph Smith and Brigham Young. Billings was a counselor in the first Bishopric of the Church to Edward Partridge. He participated in the Battle of Crooked River and was a colonel in the Nauvoo Legion. He participated in the Mormon migration as a Captain of Fifty in the second company and was a notable settler of Manti, Utah.

== Early life ==
Billings was born in Greenfield, Massachusetts, on March 25, 1793. He was the son of Ebeneezer Billings and Ester Joyce. One of Billings's notable ancestors is Sir Thomas Billing, Chief Justice of the Kings Bench in England.

== Campbellite commune ==
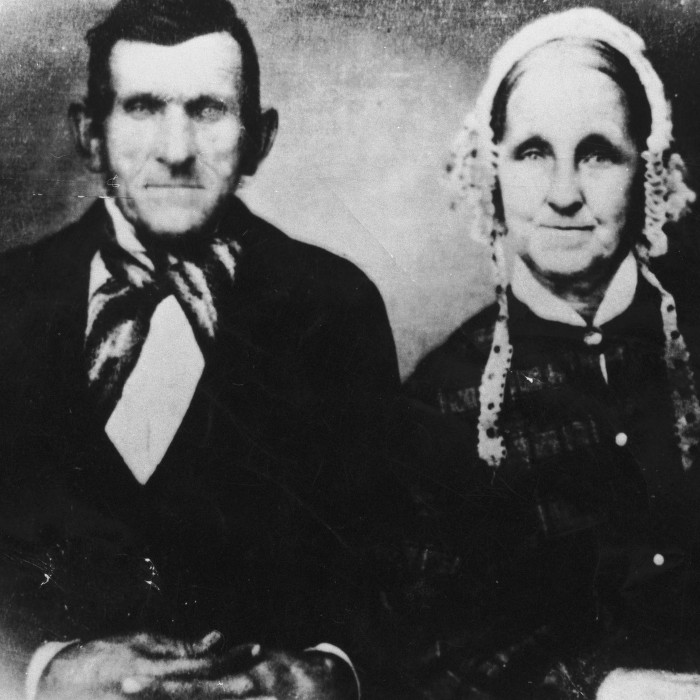
Titus and Diantha Morley Billings.

On February 16, 1817, he married Diantha Morley. Diantha and her older brother Isaac Morley were members of Sidney Rigdon's congregation of Campbellites. This utopian group practiced communal principles, holding goods in common for the benefit of all of the members. They also held the belief, called Restorationism, that a purer form of Christianity should be restored using the early Christian church as a model. These beliefs would serve as a backdrop for Billings's membership in the "Church of Christ", as The Church of Jesus Christ of Latter Day Saints was first called, including his future participation in the United Order.

When Sidney Rigdon joined the fledgling Church of Christ he held a two-hour sermon explaining to his congregation why he was making the commitment. The next morning, November 15, 1830, he was baptized. Upon calling for more converts, Billings stepped forward and was the second person baptized in Kirtland, Ohio.

== Early church membership ==
In March 1831, Joseph Smith, the founder of the Latter Day Saint movement, said he had received a revelation directing the Saints to impart of their land and money to the church. In August 1831, Billings was commanded to sell the Morley Family farm and holdings in preparation to move to Independence, Missouri. On March 10, 1832, he was ordained an elder by Thomas B. Marsh. While en route to Jackson County, Missouri, he met with Joseph Smith on the Charleston, a steam packet in Louisville, Kentucky. The Billings family arrived in Clay County, Missouri, in May.

While in Missouri, Billings participated in the United Order covenant which was made with Edward Partridge, the first bishop of the Church. However, the United Order was short-lived, and anti-Mormon pressure at the time caused Billings to lose much of his property. While storing hay on a rented farm owned by then Governor Boggs, a mob burned 24 tons of the hay and later forced Billings out of Clay County.

In February 1835, Titus and Diantha Billings were called to return to Kirtland, Ohio to help finish the Kirtland Temple. Titus was a stonemason, carpenter, and musician, while Diantha designed the original temple garments. In March, upon the temple’s completion, Diantha sang at the dedication services and Titus became a member of the School of the Prophets. The Billings family moved back to Missouri in 1837, and Titus was sustained as Second Counselor to Bishop Edward Partridge at the General Conference of the church in Far West on August 1, 1837. He served in this calling until the death of Bishop Partridge in 1840.

== Mob persecution ==
On October 25, 1838, Billings participated in the Battle of Crooked River, and as part of the aftermath was forced to flee from his home to the Des Moines River. While fleeing the mob he suffered from lack of food for several days and frostbite on his feet. As a result of the battle, Governor Boggs signed the infamous Extermination Order. Billings signed a petition documenting the losses of property during this time which were never recovered. Escaping the mobs, he and his family moved to what became known as Morleytown or Yelrome, which is near modern-day Lima, Illinois, and is a short distance from Nauvoo, Illinois.

In February 1841, the Nauvoo Legion was organized and Billings was made a captain. By September, Billings was promoted to the rank of colonel in the legion.

On August 22, 1842, Billings was called on a mission to the New England states. Luman Andros Shurtliff was his companion. They returned in June 1843 after suffering much and having only small successes.

In September 1846, Isaac Morley's cooper shop was burned and the Billings family and all of the residents of Morleytown moved to Nauvoo. During this time Billings worked daily on the Nauvoo Temple until its completion. However, due to mob pressure, their stay was short-lived, and after the death of Joseph Smith the Billings family and the Saints moved out of Nauvoo.

In 1848, Billings was appointed as a Captain of Fifty in Heber C. Kimball's company of pioneers. The company arrived in the Salt Lake Valley in the winter of 1848. In February 1849, Billings was called to the Greater Salt Lake City Stake High Council.

== Utah settlement ==
After Ute leader Walkara invited church president Brigham Young to send colonists to the Sanpitch (now Sanpete) Valley in central Utah, Young dispatched Isaac Morley and other settlers, including the Titus Billings family, to what is now the town of Manti, Utah. Manti was incorporated by the legislature in Salt Lake City, and the area was surveyed in 1851. Upon completion of the survey, the settlers left their temporary shelters at Temple Hill and moved to their city lots. Billings and Jezreel Shomaker built the first houses, and were followed by others before the next winter. The Billings home still stands today. Billings lived in Manti and was a member of the stake presidency there in 1851.

Initially the native tribes of the area were friendly towards the settlers while still at war with one another. When one tribe had a victory over another, often the women and children of the opposing tribe were taken as slaves. Upon seeing the cruel treatment of the newly enslaved children, the pioneers would sometimes purchase the children from their captors to liberate them. Titus Billings purchased a young native girl and gave her to Diantha to raise as a daughter. Diantha named the girl Rose Billings. After a few years the pioneers were able to convince the tribes that the Great Spirit was displeased with them for their cruelty to prisoners, and the practice gradually died out.

== Polygamy ==
On January 20, 1854, Titus married Mary Ann Tuttle as his second wife under the practice of polygamy. Mary Ann was the divorced ex-plural wife of Howard Egan. She bore four children with Titus before they too divorced.

== Death ==
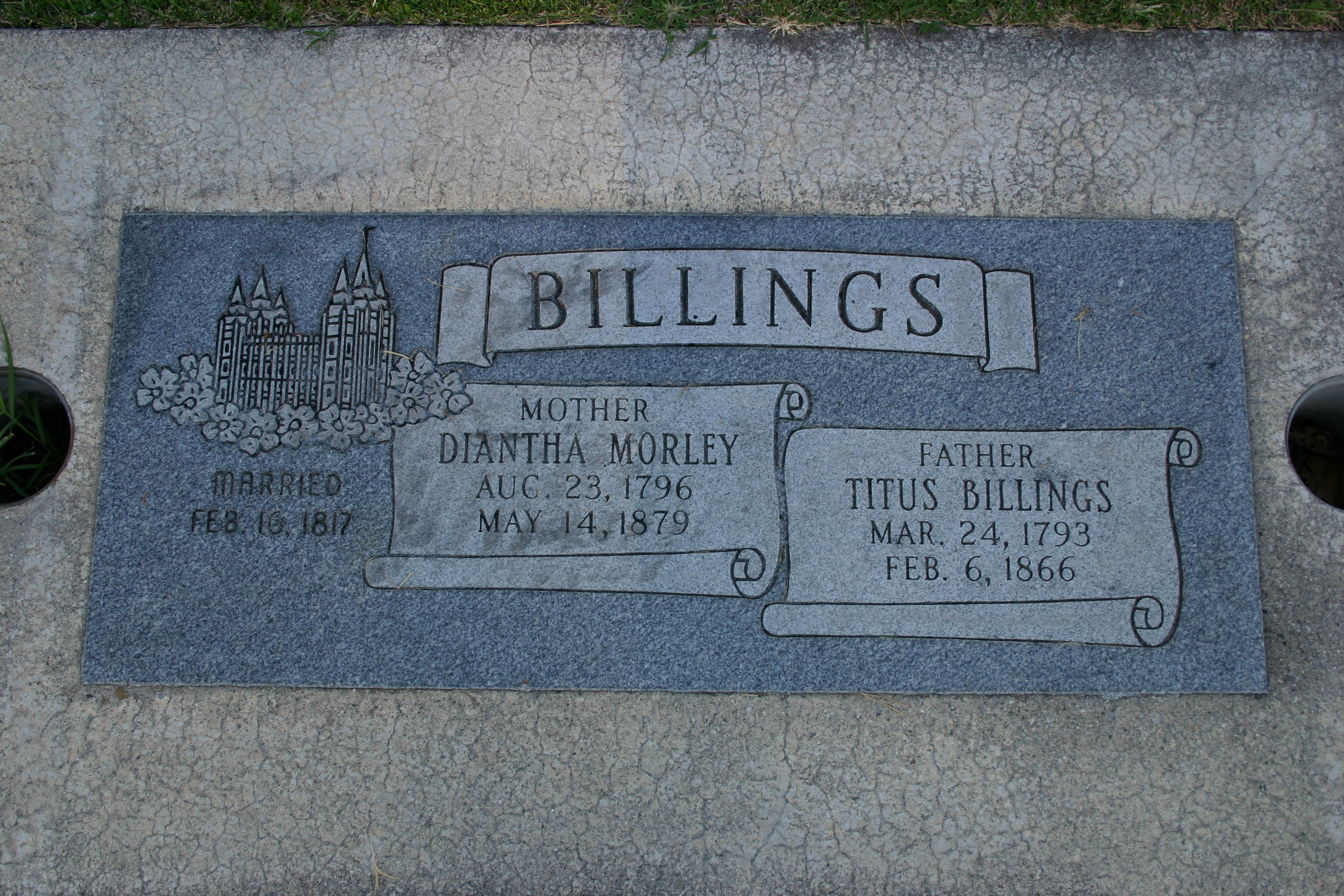
Billings' grave in Provo, Utah

In his later years, Billings moved to Provo, Utah, and died there on February 6, 1866 at the age of 72. He is buried in the Provo Cemetery with his first wife Diantha.

== Progeny ==
Children from Diantha Morley Billings:

- Samuel Dwight Billings
- Thomas Billings
- Ebenezer Billings
- Emily Billings
- Martha Billings
- Alfred Nelson Billings
- George Pierce Billings
- Eunice Billings
- Titus Billings (Jr.)

Children from Mary Ann Tuttle:

- Emily Billings
- Titus Billings (Jr.)
- Theresa Billings
- Alonzo Billings

Church of Jesus Christ of Latter Day Saints titles
Preceded by John Corrill	Second Counselor to the Bishop of the Church; August 1, 1837 – May 27, 1840	Position Vacant; May 27, 1840 – April 7, 1851; Succeeded by Jesse Carter Little as Second Counselor in the Presiding Bishopric of The Church of Jesus Christ of Latter-day Saints
