= Newel K. Whitney =

Former presiding Bishop of the LDS church

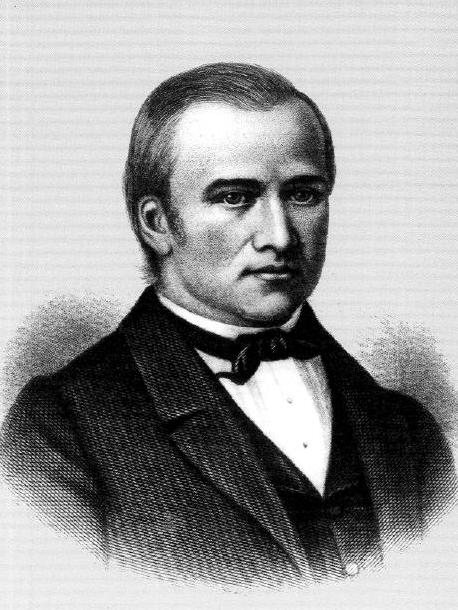

Presiding Bishop
- June 6, 1847 – September 23, 1850
- Called by: Brigham Young

First Bishop of the Church
- December 4, 1831 – June 6, 1847
- Called by: Joseph Smith, Jr.
- End reason: Called as Presiding Bishop

Personal details
- Born: Newel Kimball Whitney; February 5, 1795; Marlboro, Vermont, United States
- Died: September 23, 1850 (aged 55); Salt Lake City, Utah Territory, United States
- Resting place: Kimball-Whitney Cemetery; 40.7728°N 111.8895°W
- Spouse(s): Elizabeth Ann Whitney

Newel Kimball Whitney (February 5, 1795 – September 23, 1850, his first name being sometimes found as Newell) was a prominent member and leader in the Latter Day Saint movement and an American businessman. Whitney married Elizabeth Ann Smith in 1822. He owned a store and an ashery in Kirtland, and acquired more property as his business grew. Initially he was part of the Disciples of Christ or Campbellite movement. He joined the early Latter Day Saint church, called the Church of Christ, in 1830 after his Campbellite bishop, Sidney Rigdon also joined the church. Whitney greatly contributed financially to the growing church, paying taxes on its property and paying off the debts incurred by the United Firm. He traveled to other states for business and as part of his duties as a Bishop. In Nauvoo, he was part of the Quorum of the Anointed, consented for his daughter to become a plural wife of Joseph Smith, and participated in plural marriage. He served as the second Presiding Bishop of the Church of Jesus Christ of Latter-day Saints (LDS Church) from 1847 until his death. He died in 1850 of pleurisy.

== Early life ==
Whitney was born in Marlborough, Vermont to Samuel Whitney and Susanna Kimball. He was the second of nine children. In 1803, he moved with his family to Fairfield, Herkimer County, New York.

== Early trading career ==
In 1814, Whitney worked as an army sutler, selling supplies to American soldiers near Lake Champlain during the War of 1812. Whitney lost all of his possessions in the Battle of Plattsburgh, but continued to work as a sutler for the army until they disbanded around Monroe, Michigan. Whitney traded furs and other goods with Native Americans between the Great Lakes, often stopping in Monroe for supplies, where Algernon Sidney Gilbert had a store. According to Orson F. Whitney, when Whitney refused to sell alcohol to an alcoholic, the customer threatened his life, but a Native American woman named Modalena saved him. Gilbert and Whitney may have traveled together to New York, and they were friends. In 1817, Whitney moved to Painesville, Ohio and worked as a clerk for Gilbert, who taught him bookkeeping.

== Kirtland ==
=== 1820–1831: Early business in Kirtland and conversion ===
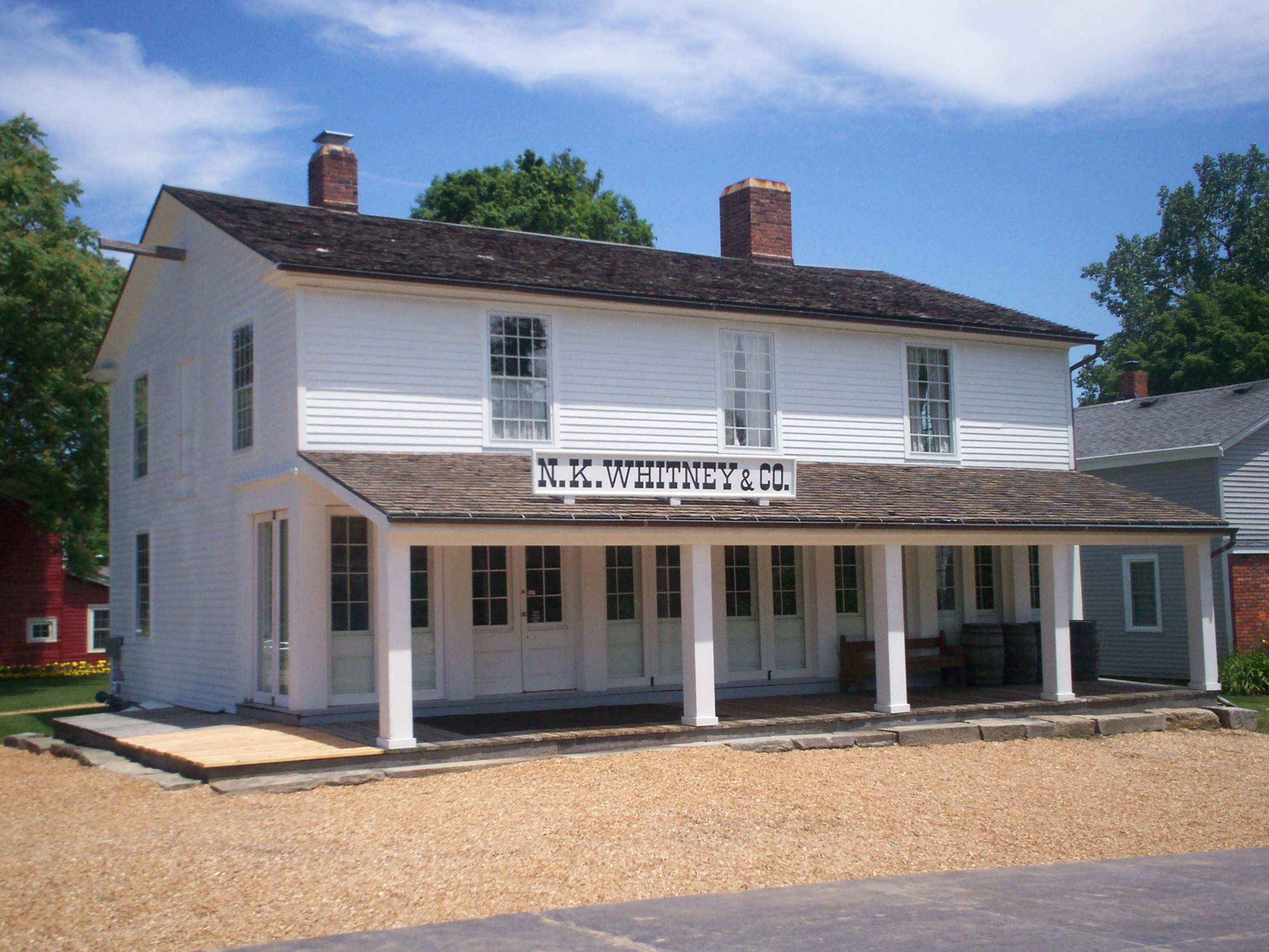
The Newel K. Whitney Store in Kirtland, Ohio.

During his travels, Whitney met Ann Smith, who lived in Kirtland. Whitney moved to Kirtland in 1819 to court Smith, and they married on October 20, 1822 in Geauga County, Ohio. In Kirtland, Whitney set up a small log cabin store in 1821 or 1822. On June 1, 1822, Whitney purchased an apple orchard at the intersection of two main roads in northern Ohio, and by 1824 had built the Red Store there. Whitney bought the lot diagonally opposite the Red Store lot in September 1822, where he made an ashery. The combined businesses helped Kirtland's local economy. Sometimes customers at his store would pay him in wood at the ashery. Wool carders would buy the potash to process their wool. In June 1824 Whitney expanded the ashery and built a home behind the Red Store.

After the Erie Canal was constructed in 1825, it decreased the price of transportation of goods to Kirtland. In April 1826, Whitney bought the lot east of the Red Store and built a medium-sized store on, which the family called the White Store. By 1827, Whitney entered into a partnership with Gilbert to run a store in Kirtland known as N.K. Whitney & Co. After the White Store opened, the Gilberts probably moved into the Red Store. In 1828, Elizabeth's widowed sister and three children moved to Kirtland and helped to work in the store. Whitney anticipated that he could make more money in the store after the decrease in the price of goods, but he could not afford to support his own family and Gilbert's. He greatly expanded the ashery in 1828. On March 5, 1829, N.K. Whitney and Sidney Gilbert & Co. purchased the southeast corner lot for an unknown purpose.

Sometime after their marriage, N.K. and Ann joined the Disciples of Christ or Campbellites. Sidney Rigdon was a bishop in the movement and baptized members. Ann worried about how Campbellites did not claim to have the authority to give members the Holy Ghost. N.K. served in the community as an elector and as a vice president of the Tract Society, part of the Grand River Bible Society. N.K. and Ann joined the Church of Christ (Latter Day Saints) in 1830 without having read The Book of Mormon. Many of their neighbors joined the church around the same time, including the Gilberts in 1831. The Whitneys provided their home for at least one congregational meeting, and donated wine for the sacrament. The prophet Joseph Smith and his family came to stay with the Whitneys for several weeks in 1830 before moving to Isaac Morley's house and soon a new house on his property.

During this time, Ann Whitney had five children. Their eldest, Horace K. Whitney, was born in 1823. Horace later married and is the father of Orson F. Whitney.

The store was added to the National Register of Historic Places in 1984.

=== 1832–1833: Joseph Smith lives in the White Store ===
Joseph Smith and Whitney were good friends. From 1832 to 1833, Smith and his family lived in the White Store. The first School of the Prophets was held in an upstairs room there, and Joseph Smith received several revelations there, including the Word of Wisdom. During 1832, Smith and Whitney visited Missouri, where Smith received a revelation that Whitney and other church leaders had "equal claim" on his properties for taking care of the poor, which would be the United Firm. In 1833, Joseph Smith washed the feet of those in the School of the Prophets, a precursor to the washing and anointings.

=== 1831–1838: Whitney as Bishop and member of the United Firm ===
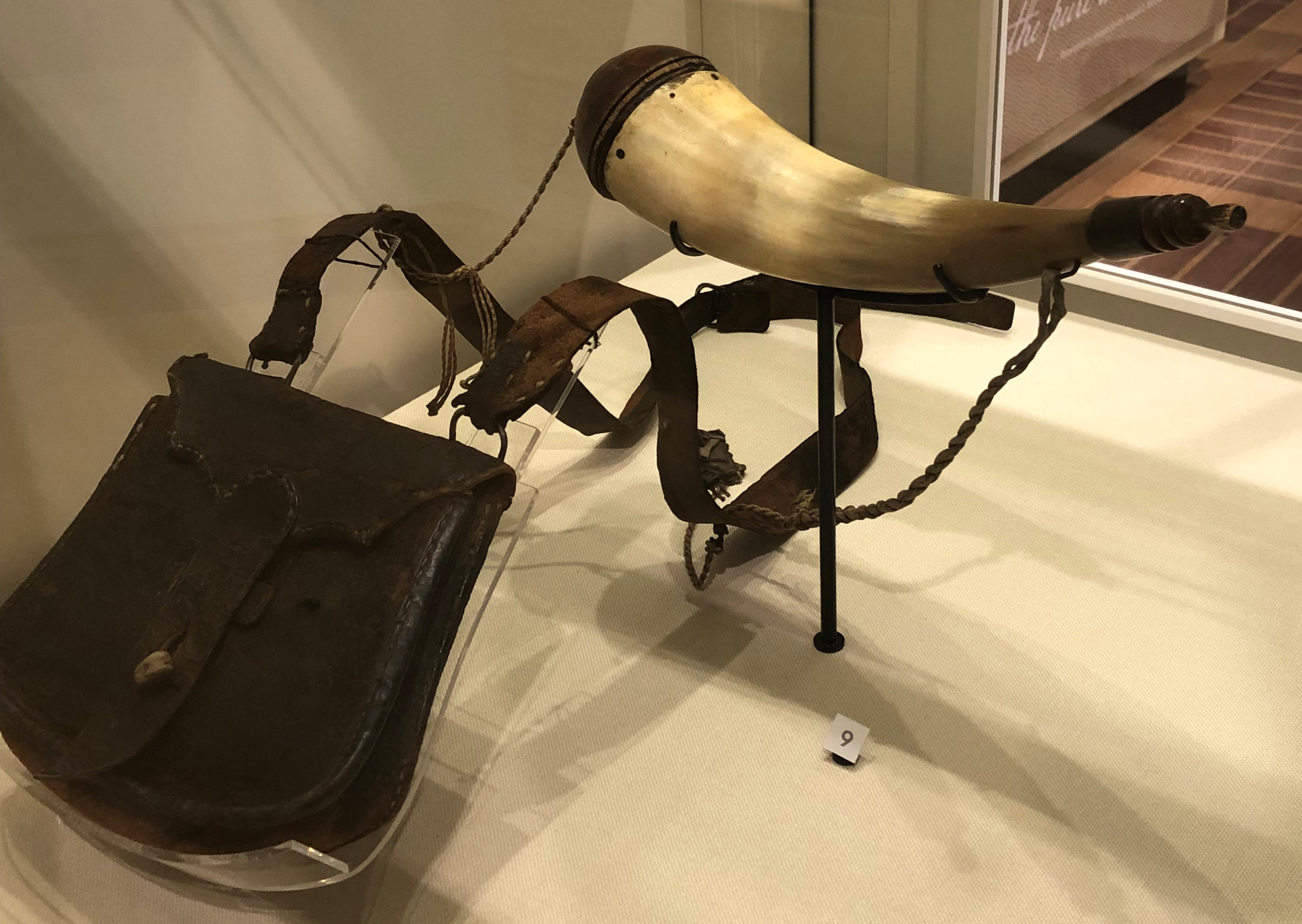
Newel K. Whitney's powder horn and bag

In 1831, Whitney was appointed as a bishop in the church. At the time, Edward Partridge was the only other bishop who had been called. Whitney made personal decisions about how a bishop should support his local community. He continued to operate his store as normal and offered limited support for the poor in an early bishop's storehouse. Two men accused Whitney of being overbearing and disrespectful. Whitney supported Gilbert's store in Missouri, which he started in 1831 and abandoned in 1833 when the members of the church were driven out of the state. Early in 1832, Reynolds Cahoon was appointed as Whitney's counselor.

In 1832, on the way back from Missouri, Whitney broke his leg and foot in a wagon accident, and Smith and Whitney stayed in a public house in Greenville for four weeks while he recovered. Later that year, Newel was assigned to visit church members in New York, Albany, and Boston. Acting as the church's financial officer, the United Firm acquired over 100 acres of land in Kirtland, which Whitney paid taxes on. Whitney's ashery became the site of the Kirtland Temple, whose construction began in 1833.

In 1833, the Overseers of the poor made a warning list of 22 unemployed families that might be expelled from Kirtland for being too dependent on their community. At the time, this was a fairly common practice, although such a long list was unusual. Such a list shows the extent that the church (and Whitney) must have been supporting its members, many of whom were working to construct the temple. The United Firm was dissolved in 1834, with Whitney paying the debts members owed to each other. The United Firm then wrote off over $3,000 of debt, and members decided to do business individually. The same year, Sidney Gilbert died of cholera, and N.K. Whitney and Company was dissolved in 1838. Whitney's ashery probably burned in 1834.

In 1835, Whitney and Hyrum Smith went to New York to borrow money and buy goods. These goods helped supply new stores established by other church members. Whitney helped Joseph Smith establish a store in Kirtland, but it was disbanded a year later, probably because the town was already well-supplied by Whitney's store. On October 31, 1835, Whitney brought his parents to visit Kirtland, where they met Joseph Smith and were subsequently baptized. By 1836, Whitney was giving food to the poor and needy. The Whitneys moved to Missouri in 1838, where Whitney was appointed as a bishop, but persecution drove them to Illinois shortly after their move.

== Nauvoo ==
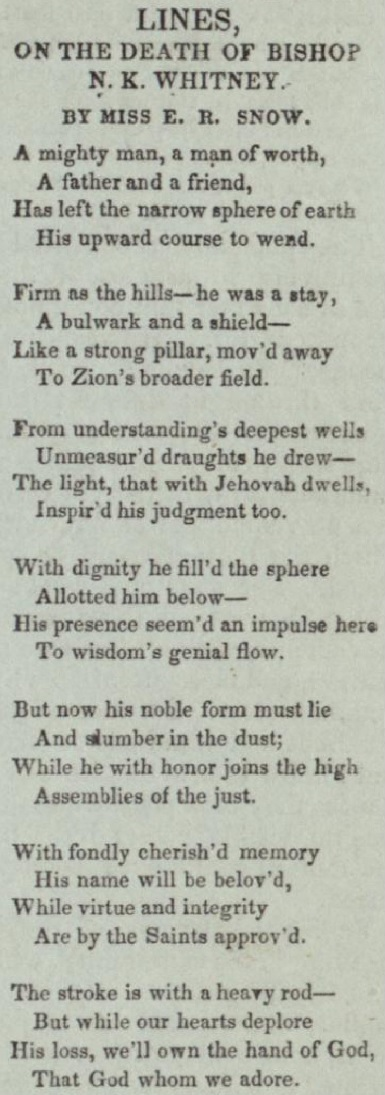
Poem eulogizing Whitney by Eliza R. Snow in the Deseret News

While in Nauvoo, Illinois, Whitney was involved in some important developments within the Church. He was part of the Quorum of the Anointed and also joined in the practice of polygamy. On May 4, 1842 when Whitney, along with a group of nine others, met in the upper story of the Red Brick Store. Those who were there, including Whitney, became part of Joseph Smith's Quorum of the Anointed. Later, Whitney's wife, Elizabeth Ann, was added to the quorum. The Whitneys and the other members of the Quorum of the Anointed were "some of the highest ranking and most trusted leaders of the LDS church."

In 1842, after being taught the doctrine of polygamy, Whitney and Elizabeth Ann agreed to let their daughter, Sarah Ann, become a plural wife of Joseph Smith. Two years later, Whitney married Olive M. Bishop as a plural wife. Also in 1844, Whitney became a member of the Council of Fifty and became First Bishop when Edward Partridge died. Whitney's "First Bishop" title was changed to "Presiding Bishop" in 1847. In 1845 he married Emmeline B. Woodward Harris, Almira Elizabeth Pond, Abigail A. Pond, Elizabeth M. More, and Henrietta Keyes. He married Ann Houston in 1846. Emmeline had married a young man when she was 15, but he deserted her after the death of their son. Whitney married Emmeline when she was seventeen and had two children with her. Later Emmeline married Daniel H. Wells and became a president of the Relief Society. Whitney also was sealed to Isabel Modalena and Melvina C. Blanch.

After Joseph Smith's death, Whitney was a trustee-in-trust for the church. Whitney was a member of the Masonic Lodge in Nauvoo. He was an alderman in Nauvoo from 1841 to 1843. From 1846 to 1847, Whitney led Church members in settling at Winter Quarters.

In 1848, Whitney migrated to Utah, and in 1849 he was the bishop of the Salt Lake City Eighteenth Ward. Whitney helped place new immigrants in communities. He helped Brigham Young locate and plan Ogden, Utah. He died in 1850 of "bilious pleurisy". LDS Church president Gordon B. Hinckley compared Whitney's role in the early church to a Presiding Bishop who oversees the Church's physical assets.

== See also ==
- Council on the Disposition of the Tithes

The Church of Jesus Christ of Latter-day Saints titles
Position Vacant; May 27, 1840 – October 7, 1844; Preceded by Edward Partridge as Bishop of the Church of the Church of Jesus Christ of Latter Day Saints	Presiding Bishop; June 6, 1847 – September 23, 1850; First Bishop of the Church; October 7, 1844 – June 6, 1847	Succeeded by Edward Hunter
