= Reynolds Cahoon =

American Mormon leader (1790–1861)

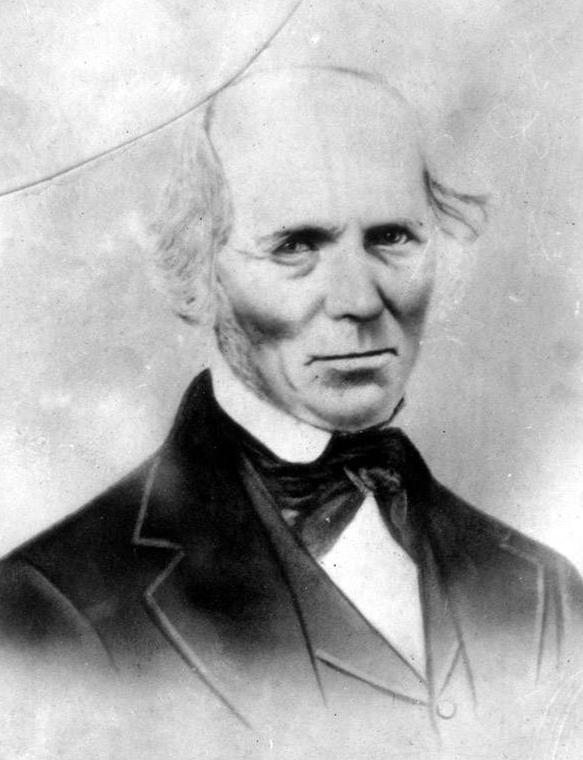

Council of Fifty, Kirtland High Council

Personal details
- Born: April 30, 1790; Cambridge, New York, United States
- Died: April 29, 1861 (aged 70); South Cottonwood, Utah Territory, United States
- Known For: Early leader in the Church of Jesus Christ of Latter Day Saints, Mormon pioneer

Reynolds Cahoon (April 30, 1790 – April 29, 1861) was an early leader in Latter Day Saint movement and later, in The Church of Jesus Christ of Latter-day Saints (LDS Church). He was one of the inaugural members of the Council of Fifty, organized by Joseph Smith Jr in 1844.

== Early life ==
Cahoon was born on April 30, 1790, to William Cahoon and Mehitabel Hodge Cahoon in Cambridge, New York. He married Thirza Stiles (1789-1866) on December 11, 1810, in Newport, New York. The following year, Cahoon moved to Harpersfield, Ohio. He then served in the War of 1812. Cahoon and Stiles had four daughters. Cahoon worked as a farmer, tanner, and shoemaker.

== Latter Day Saint movement ==
Cahoon was baptized a member of The Church of Jesus Christ of Latter-Day Saints by Parley P. Pratt on October 11, 1830. After his baptism, he was ordained a high priest by Joseph Smith Jr. On June 6, 1831, Cahoon was called to serve a mission to Missouri with Samuel Smith, a brother of Joseph Smith. While living in Kirtland, Ohio, he was appointed a member of the committee to oversee the construction of the first Latter Day Saint temple. He began work on the structure's foundation and raised funds for the project by working at a store. He also participated in the Kirtland Safety Society. On February 10, 1832, Cahoon was made first counselor to Bishop Newel K. Whitney. He was also a member of the Kirtland High Council. Cahoon again served as a missionary in 1833, this time traveling to Warsaw, New York, to preach alongside David W. Patten. In 1834, Joseph Smith named Cahoon's newborn son "Mahonri Moriancumer Cahoon," explaining that the name was the name of the Brother of Jared, a figure in the Book of Mormon.

In 1838, Cahoon relocated to Daviess County, Missouri, and served in the stake presidency of Adam-ondi-Ahman. When the Mormon Extermination Order forced the Latter Day Saints to leave Missouri, Cahoon fled to Iowa Territory before settling in Nauvoo, Illinois. There, he served as a guard in the Nauvoo Legion from March 1841 and was on the building committee for the Nauvoo Temple. On March 11, 1844, Cahoon was appointed to the Council of Fifty, a church organization of a secular nature that sought to "obtain redress for the Missouri persecutions and to find a safe haven where the saints could move." When Joseph and Hyrum Smith attempted to flee Nauvoo, Cahoon traveled across the Mississippi River with Porter Rockwell to deliver a message from Emma Smith, Joseph's wife. Cahoon encouraged Smith to return to Nauvoo, despite the danger from mobs. Cahoon and others "advised the Prophet Joseph to surrender to the law at Carthage." After the death of Joseph and Hyrum Smith, Cahoon served as a guard for their bodies. He was then arrested for treason, but the case was dismissed due to lack of evidence.

He later practiced plural marriage, marrying Lucina Roberts in 1843 and Mary Hildrath in 1846 while living in Nauvoo, Illinois. He had two sons and one daughter with Roberts and no known children with Hildrath. In 1846, Cahoon and his wives Thurza Stiles and Lucina Roberts moved to Winter Quarters, Nebraska, with their children. In 1848, Cahoon traveled west to Utah Territory, serving as captain of the 6th company of Mormon pioneers. He settled in Murray, Utah. There is no record of his wife Mary Hildrath accompanying him.

== Death and legacy ==
Cahoon died in Salt Lake City, Utah on April 29, 1861. He was 1 day shy of 71 years old. His cause of death was recorded as dropsy. In an announcement of his death, the Deseret News called him "a cheerful partaker in all their [the Latter Day Saints'] tribulations, privations and persecutions; an active member; a faithful servant". He is mentioned in the LDS Church edition of the Doctrine and Covenants four times.
