= William B. Preston (Mormon) =

American LDS Church bishop (1830–1908)

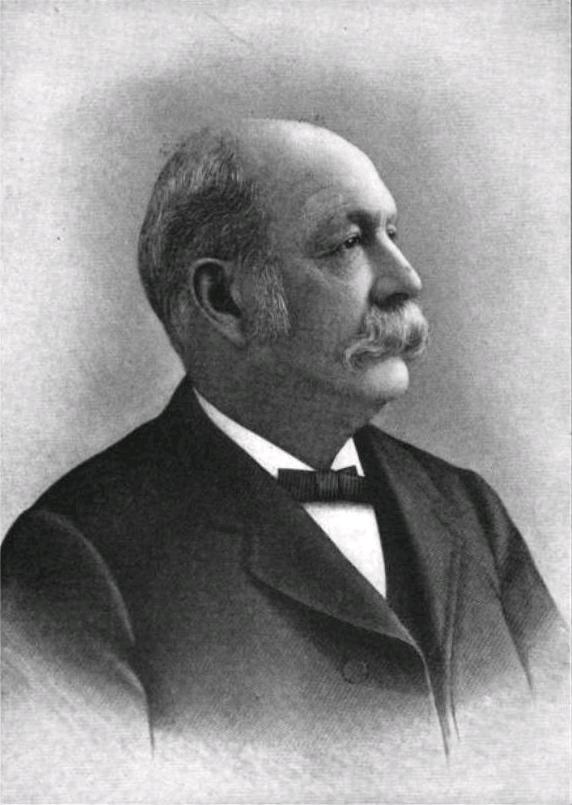

Presiding Bishop
- April 6, 1884 – December 4, 1907
- Called by: John Taylor
- End reason: Honorably released for reasons of health

Personal details
- Born: William Bowker Preston; November 24, 1830; Halifax, Virginia, United States
- Died: August 2, 1908 (aged 77); Salt Lake City, Utah, United States
- Signature

William Bowker Preston (November 24, 1830 – August 2, 1908) was the fourth Presiding Bishop of the Church of Jesus Christ of Latter-day Saints (LDS Church) between 1884 and 1907.

== Biography ==
Born in Halifax, Franklin County, Virginia, Preston was raised on a farm but at age 19 became a store clerk. He traveled to California by the Panama route in 1852.

He shortly afterward became a farmer in Yolo County, California. It was here that he joined the LDS Church. Preston was baptized by Henry G. Boyle in February 1857 and shortly afterward was ordained an elder by George Q. Cannon. Preston then served as a missionary in northern California until later that year when he led a company of Latter-day Saints to Utah Territory, responding to the call to gather in anticipation of the Utah War. Among those in Preston's company gathering to Utah was Moses Thatcher. Thatcher's sister Harriet A. Thatcher was also in this company, and the following February Preston married Harriet Thatcher. In 1859 Preston was among the first settlers of Logan, Utah. He was made bishop of Logan in November 1859.

Beginning in 1862, Preston served as a member of the Utah territorial legislature.

From 1865 to 1868 Preston served as a missionary in England. The next winter he spent as a sub-contractor working on the Union Pacific Railroad. He served as a member of the territorial legislature again from 1872 to 1882 and continued to serve as bishop of Logan after his return from England. In 1871, he became presiding bishop over Cache County, succeeding Peter Maughan, the first holder of this office, who had just died. Preston served as vice-president of the Utah and Northern Railway (the president was John W. Young), which was key to further economic development of Cache Valley. In 1877, Preston became first counselor to Moses Thatcher in the presidency of the Cache Stake. From 1879 to 1884, Preston served as president of the Cache Stake.

Preston also served as a director of the Logan Cooperative Mercantile Institution, and he also served on the board of trustees of Brigham Young College and as chairman of the executive committee of that college. From 1870 until 1882, Preston served as mayor of Logan.

Preston was a member of the Utah State Constitutional Convention in 1895, which led to Utah gaining statehood in 1896.

Preston was called to be the Presiding Bishop of the LDS Church by LDS Church president John Taylor on April 6, 1884. Preston served until ill health forced him to resign his position on December 4, 1907. He died of pneumonia in Salt Lake City, Utah, and was buried at Logan City Cemetery. The towns of Preston, Nevada and Preston, Idaho, in northern Cache Valley, are named after him.

== See also ==
- Council on the Disposition of the Tithes
- John Q. Cannon
- Leonard W. Hardy
- Robert T. Burton

The Church of Jesus Christ of Latter-day Saints titles
| Preceded by Edward Hunter | Presiding Bishop; April 6, 1884 – December 11, 1907 | Succeeded by Charles W. Nibley |
