= Edward Hunter (Mormon) =

American politician

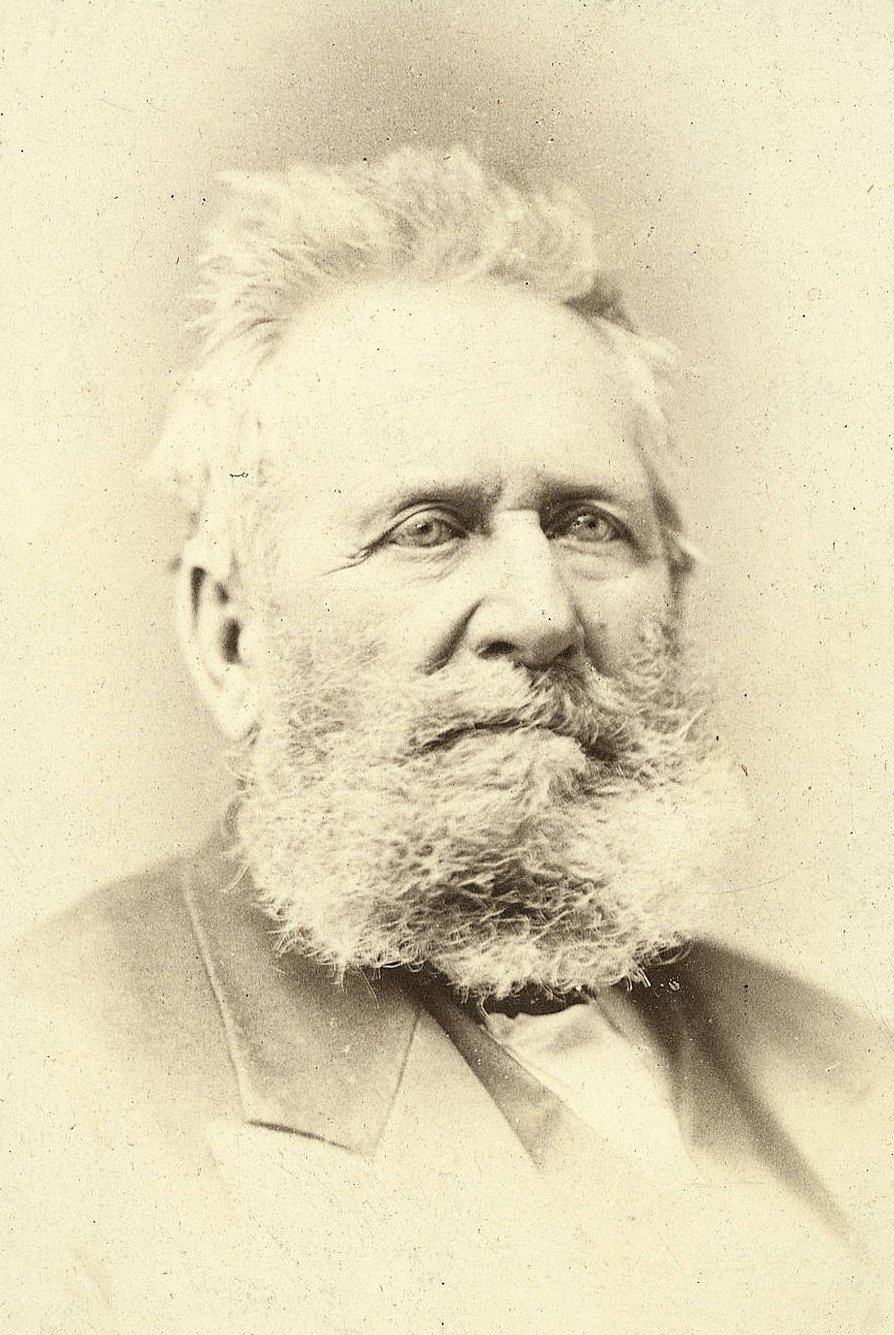
- Edward Hunter photographed by Charles Roscoe Savage

Presiding Bishop
- April 7, 1851 – October 16, 1883
- Called by: Brigham Young

Personal details
- Born: Edward Hunter Jr. June 22, 1793; Newtown Square, Pennsylvania
- Died: October 16, 1883 (aged 90); Salt Lake City, Utah Territory
- Signature

Edward Hunter Jr. (June 22, 1793 – October 16, 1883) was the third Presiding Bishop of the Church of Jesus Christ of Latter-day Saints (LDS Church) from 1851 until his death. He served as Presiding Bishop longer than any other person in the history of the LDS Church.

== Biography ==
Born to Edward Hunter and Hannah Maris in Newtown Square, Pennsylvania, Hunter was engaged in the mercantile business near Philadelphia from 1816 to 1822 and was married to Ann Standley in 1830. Hunter served in the United States Cavalry for seven years, and as Delaware County commissioner for three years. During this time, Hunter identified as a Swedenborgian.

Hunter converted to the Church of Jesus Christ of Latter Day Saints in 1840, served as bishop of the Nauvoo 5th Ward from 1844 to 1846, and made significant financial contributions to the early church. He migrated to the Salt Lake Valley in 1846–47 and served as the bishop of the Salt Lake City 13th Ward from 1849 to 1854. Hunter was elected to the Utah Territorial Assembly on November 15, 1851, and served one term.

Hunter was called as Presiding Bishop by LDS Church president Brigham Young in 1851. Young and Heber C. Kimball served as Hunter's informal counselors for more than five years until Hunter formally called Leonard W. Hardy and Jesse Carter Little to these positions.

As ex officio president of the church's Aaronic priesthood, Hunter laid the southwest cornerstone of the Salt Lake Temple on April 6, 1853.

Hunter died at Salt Lake City, Utah Territory, and was buried at the Salt Lake City Cemetery.

== See also ==
- Council on the Disposition of the Tithes
- George Goddard (Mormon)

The Church of Jesus Christ of Latter-day Saints titles
Preceded by Newel K. Whitney	Presiding Bishop; April 7, 1851 – October 16, 1883	Succeeded by William B. Preston
