= Edward Partridge =

American Latter Day Saint convert and bishop

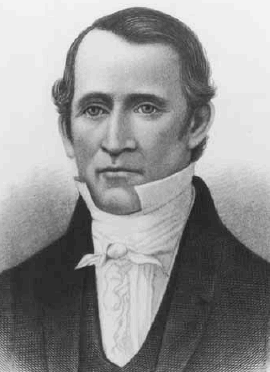

Bishop of the Church
- February 4, 1831 – May 27, 1840
- Called by: Joseph Smith

Personal details
- Born: August 27, 1793; Pittsfield, Massachusetts, United States
- Died: May 27, 1840 (aged 46); Nauvoo, Illinois, United States
- Resting place: Old Nauvoo Burial Grounds; 40.5369°N 91.3507°W
- Spouse(s): Lydia Clisbee
- Children: 7

Edward Partridge Sr. (August 27, 1793 – May 27, 1840) was one of the earliest converts to the Latter Day Saint movement and served as the first Bishop of the Church.

== Early life ==
Edward Partridge was born on August 27, 1793, to William and Jemima Partridge in Pittsfield, Massachusetts. He was the grandson of Massachusetts congressman Oliver Partridge.

Partridge was raised in Massachusetts but moved to Painesville, Ohio, while in his early 20s. There, he married Lydia Clisbee on August 22, 1819, just before his twenty-sixth birthday. Their family grew to include seven children: two sons and five daughters. Partridge was a hatter, and owned his own store in upstate New York. Early on, Partridge was part of the Universal Restorationist movement but he later became a reformed Baptist (also known as the Disciples of Christ or the Campbellites), a religious group led by Sidney Rigdon.

Partridge was sent to New York in 1830 by a group of Painesville citizens affiliated with the reformer baptist movement to investigate the Church of Jesus Christ of Latter-day Saints, traveling with Sidney Rigdon. He was baptized a member of the Church of Christ (later renamed The Church of Jesus Christ of Latter-day Saints) in or near Seneca Lake, New York, on December 11, 1830, and upon his return to Painesville discovered that his wife had also become a convert.

== Church service ==
After his baptism, Partridge traveled to the Latter Day Saint settlement of Kirtland, Ohio, with Sidney Rigdon and Emma Smith. He then became the first to hold the position of bishop in the Church of Christ. He is often considered to have been the first presiding bishop in the church, although the differentiation of the two distinct levels of bishop did not really occur until after Partridge's death. In this position he helped lead the Mormon settlement in Jackson County, Missouri, and managed land distribution under the law of consecration. Partridge was present at the New Jerusalem Temple Lot dedication.

He was tarred and feathered by an anti-Mormon mob on July 20, 1833, in front of the courthouse in Independence, Missouri, where he had been assigned to preside as bishop, then forced to move to Clay County, Missouri, followed by Caldwell County in 1836. During 1835, he served a mission in Illinois, Iowa, Ohio, and Indiana, then entered into another mission in New York and New England. Following the 1838 Mormon War, Partridge was jailed in Richmond, Missouri for three or four weeks. In 1839, he was expelled from the state.

Partridge served as bishop everywhere he lived in Missouri, holding the title even when he was away on a mission. In 1839, when the members of the Church of Jesus Christ of Latter-day Saints established a settlement at Nauvoo, Illinois, Partidge was appointed as bishop of the Upper Ward of Nauvoo. He was also seen as the senior among the bishops of the church, who at that time numbered three.

== Death and legacy ==
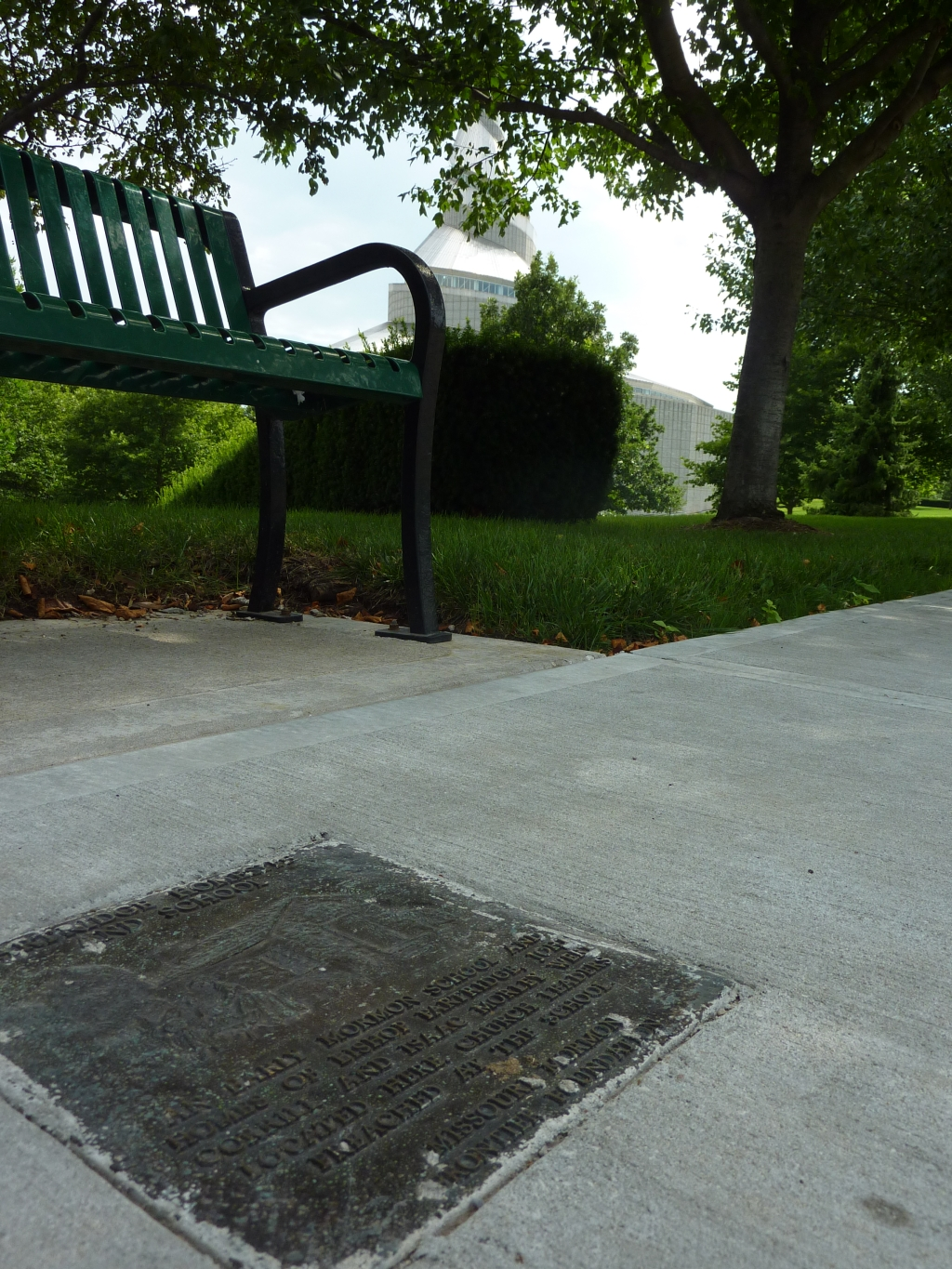
July 2010 photo shows marker for Edward Partridge home/church/school with Community of Christ Temple in background, Independence, Missouri. The intersection of Lexington and Union Streets is north across the street from the marker.

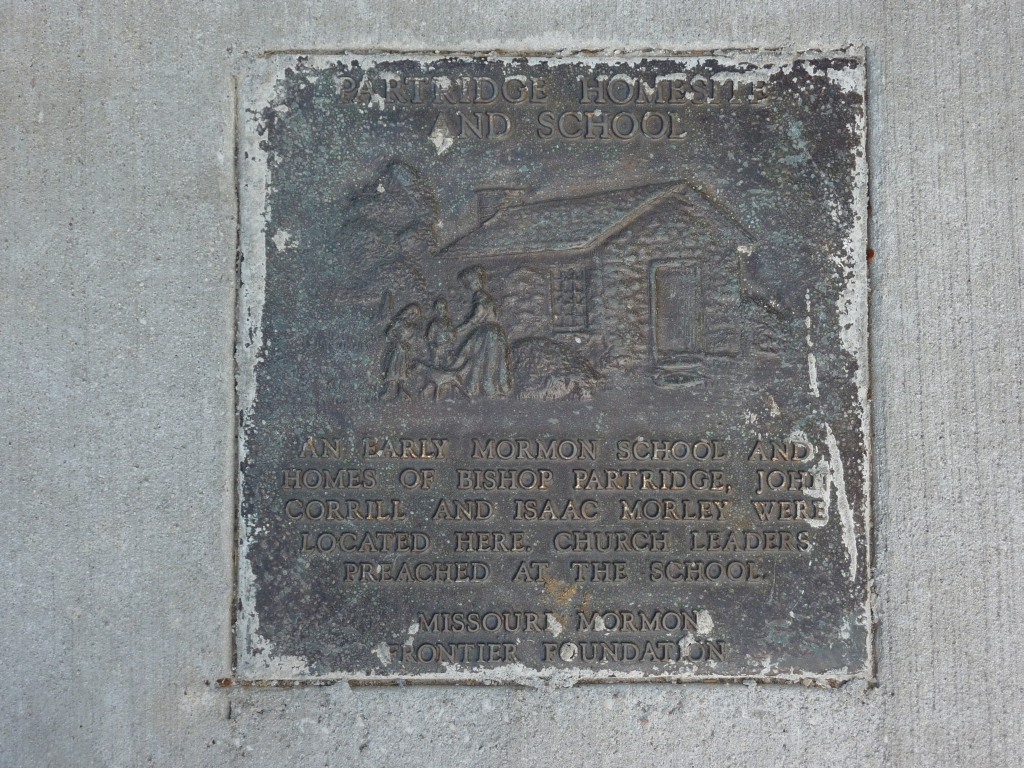
Closeup of marker describing location of Edward Partridge home/church/school on Temple Lot property 1831-1833. The building was destroyed by arson on November 5, 1833.

Partridge died on May 27, 1840, in Nauvoo, Illinois, at the age of 46. Partridge expended much of his wealth in support of the movement before he died. Joseph Smith suggested that Partridge's death could be attributed to the stress and persecution which he and other Mormon settlers in western Missouri were subjected to in the 1830s.

After Partridge died, his widow Lydia married William Huntington, father of Zina D. H. Young. Partridge's daughter Caroline Ely Partridge married Amasa Lyman, and through this line he became a direct ancestor of James E. Faust, who was a 20th- and 21st-century apostle of the Church of Jesus Christ of Latter-day Saints. His daughter Emily Partridge was a wife of Brigham Young. His son Edward Partridge Jr. was a religious and political leader in Utah during the territorial period.

== See also ==
- Council on the Disposition of the Tithes
- Latter Day Saint martyrs

== External resources ==
- Media related to Edward Partridge at Wikimedia Commons
- Grampa Bill's G.A. Pages, archived from the original on June 5, 2011
- Partridge family papers, MSS 6051, L. Tom Perry Special Collections, Harold B. Lee Library, Brigham Young University
- The journal of bishop Edward Partridge, MSS SC 544, L. Tom Perry Special Collections, Harold B. Lee Library, Brigham Young University
- Edward Partridge road tax receipts, MSS SC 242, L. Tom Perry Special Collections, Harold B. Lee Library, Brigham Young University

Church of Jesus Christ of Latter Day Saints titles
| New title | Bishop of the Church; February 4, 1831 – May 27, 1840 | Position Vacant; May 27, 1840 – October 7, 1844; Succeeded by: Newel K. Whitney as Bishop of the Church of The Church of Jesus Christ of Latter-day Saints |
