= Finances of the Church of Jesus Christ of Latter-day Saints =

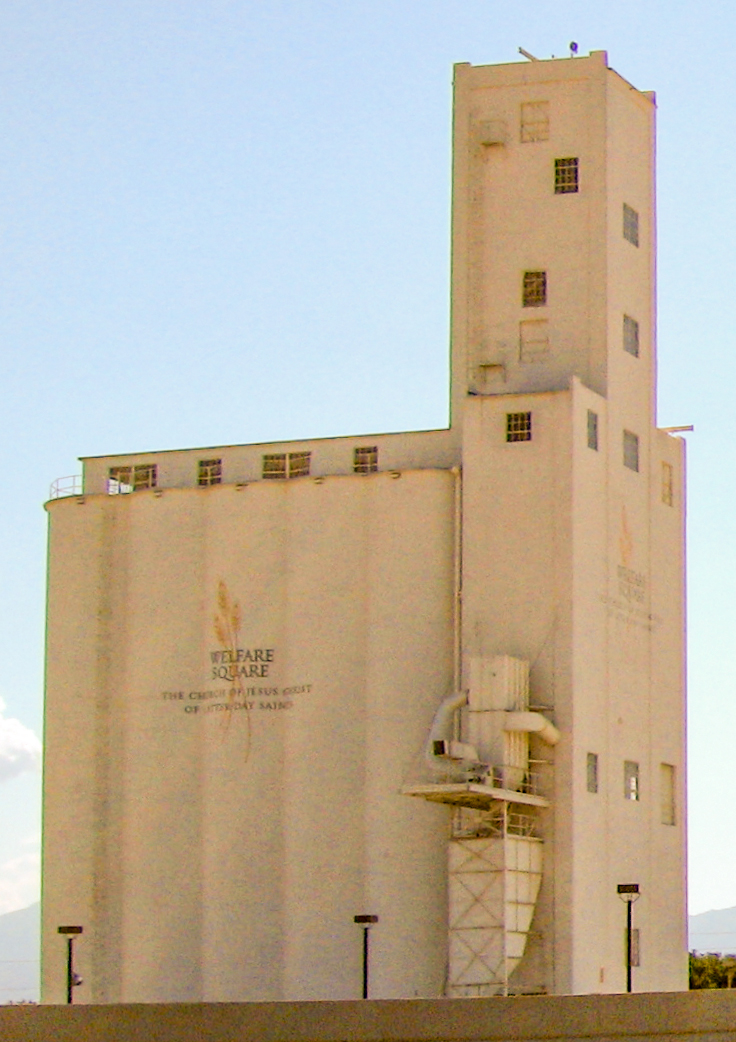
This 15-barreled silo at Welfare Square contains enough wheat to feed a small city for 6 months.

The finances of the Church of Jesus Christ of Latter-day Saints (LDS Church) are not a matter of public record. In the absence of official statements, people interested in knowing the LDS Church's financial status and behavior, including both members of the LDS Church and others, have attempted to estimate or guess. According to the church, their funding comes from the donations of its members and the principal expense is in constructing and maintaining facilities.

In the United States, the church has been designated as a tax-exempt 501(c)(3) organization since 1941 and has not publicly disclosed its financial statements since 1959. The church does disclose its financials in the United Kingdom and Canada where it is required to do so by law. In the UK, these financials are audited by the UK office of PricewaterhouseCoopers.

As of 2023, the church's net worth is estimated by external sources to be around $265 billion, up almost $29 billion from the year before. This estimate would make the LDS Church one of the wealthiest religious institutions in the world.

== History ==
In the 1880s and 1890s, the LDS Church fell into severe financial distress due to several factors that were exacerbated by the nationwide economic depression that began with the Panic of 1893.

Under the provisions of the anti-polygamy Edmunds–Tucker Act of 1887, which the U.S. Supreme Court ruled was constitutional in its 1890 decision Late Corporation of the Church of Jesus Christ of Latter-Day Saints v. United States, the U.S. government had confiscated church property, including tithing money donated by members (real estate such as churches and temples was never seized, though the Edmunds-Tucker act allowed for such seizures). Additionally, the LDS Church had borrowed extensively to finance a variety of infrastructural developments such as gristmills and after the 1893 financial crisis, the church was unable to make timely payments on their loans. Wilford Woodruff, church president from 1889 to 1898, privately expressed doubt that the church would ever pay its debts. Eventually the LDS Church obtained the backing of investment bank Kuhn, Loeb & Co. to issue bonds backed by the labor of Utah residents.

Shortly after Lorenzo Snow became president of the church in 1898, he began reemphasizing the payment of tithing (giving 10% of one's income to the church); by 1907 the church was out of the debt it had been in. Since then it has not used debt to fund its operations, even for capital projects. An early pioneer venture of the church was ZCMI which lasted from 1868 to divesting ZCMI Center Mall in 2007.

During the late 1950s and early 1960s, the church greatly increased spending on buildings under the leadership of Henry Moyle. Moyle's reasoning was that by building larger meetinghouses, the church would attract more converts. The accelerated building program led to a $32 million deficit in 1962. It was Moyle who convinced David O. McKay to discontinue publishing an annual financial statement in order to hide the extent of the spending. Eventually, McKay relieved Moyle from his administrative responsibilities and spending was reined in.

In 1941, the church obtained a designation with the IRS as a tax-exempt 501(c)(3) organization, which it currently maintains. Donations are tax-deductible in the United States.

In 1997, Time magazine called the LDS Church one of the world's wealthiest churches per capita, with assets totalling at least $30 billion.

From 1915 to 1959, the church made detailed public disclosures of its finances at its annual April general conference. Since then, however, the church has given a more brief report from its internal Auditing Department. Due to its public silence on detailed matters of finances, interested parties both inside and outside the church have made various attempts to estimate or guess at the church's financial details such as income and net worth. The Widow's Mite Report is a third-party organization which attempts to use publicly available information to track, analyze, and report on the church's finances to the public.

In 2021, James Huntsman, a former member of the church and son of Jon Huntsman, Sr. sued to recover tithing he had paid when a church member, which he argued was obtained from him fraudulently. In 2025, the lawsuit was unanimously dismissed by a panel of 11 judges. During the legal proceedings, the church fought to keep its internal financial information out of the public record, which its lawyer called "extremely sensitive."

== Modern source of funding ==
According to the LDS Church, most of its revenues come in the form of tithes and fast offerings contributed by members. Tithing donations are used to support operations of the church, and are transferred from local units directly to church headquarters in Salt Lake City, where the funds are centrally managed. As of 2012, the church brought in $7 billion annually from tithing.

An independent analysis in 2024 estimated the church's net worth at approximately $293 billion, of which $206 billion is held in its investment portfolio, intended as a reserve or "rainy-day" fund. The analysis estimated that those investments could directly pay for all expected church costs for the next 30 years, and that earned interest on current reserve funds could hypothetically fund church operations perpetually at current levels. Lastly, it estimated that church members contribute between $5.5 billion and $6.5 billion annually in tithing.

=== Tithing outside the United States ===
Financial records are required by law to be reported in some countries such as Australia, the United Kingdom and Canada.

Tithing receipts by country
Year	Australia*	Great Britain	Canada*
2016	A$30,462,681	£31,142,000	
2017	A$32,089,024	£31,092,000	
2018	A$34,744,045	£32,303,000	C$178,017,618
2019	A$34,987,420	£31,734,000	C$177,533,188
2020	A$29,825,902	£29,221,000	C$179,299,529
2021	A$35,108,544	£34,408,000	C$186,339,188
2022	A$40,156,155		C$184,567,959
*All receipted donations, including tithing

== Use of funds ==
The LDS Church states that it uses most of its financial resources to construct and maintain buildings and other facilities. The church also spends its funds on providing social welfare and relief and supporting missionary, educational, and other church-sponsored programs. Additionally, mission presidents, who serve full-time in these capacities, can receive compensation from the church in the form of housing, living allowances, and other benefits while they are on assignment. No funds are provided for services rendered.

=== Construction of facilities ===
The church has stated it uses tithing funds to build new chapels and temples. The LDS Church has 385 temples in various phases, which includes 227 dedicated temples (221 operating, 6 undergoing renovations), 8 with dedications scheduled, 57 under construction, 7 with groundbreaking ceremonies scheduled, and 86 others announced (not yet under construction).

=== Maintenance of facilities ===
The church pays to maintain its chapels and temples around the world. These costs include repairs, utilities, grounds maintenance, and specialized custodial work. Members also assist with cleaning local chapels by providing general custodial work. These facilities are cost-centers for the church, and maintaining them represents a significant use of the church's funds. The materials used in church classes and the budgets to run activities and other things done by the various congregations of the church are also centrally funded. It also funds the printing and distribution of manuals for classes, and funds all congregational activities through centralized budgeting.

=== Charitable expenditures ===
==== Church welfare ====
The LDS Church operates a welfare distribution system. It encourages members to strive to be self-sufficient, and then to seek financial assistance from family where possible, before seeking public or state-sponsored welfare or relying on church welfare resources. AgReserves Inc., Deseret Cattle and Citrus Ranch, and Farmland Reserve, Inc. are part of its welfare distribution system. Welfare resources are distributed by local bishops but maintained by the Presiding Bishopric.

An independent analysis in 2024 estimated that the church spent $905 million in 2024 "on a range of member welfare programs, including bishops’ storehouses, fast offering relief, family services counseling, employment aid, Deseret Industries and other outlets."

==== Humanitarian aid ====
Church humanitarian aid includes organizing food security, clean water, mobility, and healthcare projects, operating Deseret Industries thrift stores, and funding other organizations. The church reports that the value of all charitable donations in 2021 was $906 million. Independent reporting estimated that the church's charity organization, LDS Charities, gave a total of $177 million from 2008 to 2020.

In 2016, the church reported that it had spent a total of $1.2 billion on humanitarian aid over the previous 30 years.

In 2025, the church reported it provided $1.45 billion in humanitarian aid during 2024. The 2024 independent analysis by Widow's Mite estimated that the church spent $650 million, up from $88 million in 2020, and that humanitarian aid spending was on track to match church member welfare program expenditures, within the next one to three years.

=== Education ===
The LDS Church uses donations to support all, or part, of the Church Educational System (CES). As part of CES, the church owns, operates, and subsidizes education at Brigham Young University, BYU–Idaho, BYU–Hawaii, and Ensign College. CES also includes the seminary program for secondary students (typically, ages 14–18), and institutes of religion for post-secondary students and adult learners. In 2011, approximately 730,000 individuals were enrolled in seminary and institute programs in 147 countries. CES courses of study are separate from religious instruction provided through church congregations.

The church also operates a handful of elementary and secondary schools in the Pacific Islands and Mexico.

=== Other programs ===
The church also spends tithing funds collected on missionary, youth, and other programs which the church considers to be within its mission. Although the families of LDS missionaries (usually young men ages 18–25 or young women above age 19) generally pay US$500 a month for missions, general church funds are used to assist those who need additional support to pay for their missions. Additionally, the church provides a mission office and mission home for each of its 399 missions and pays for television advertising offering free copies of the Book of Mormon, the Bible, and church-produced videos and DVDs. The cost of printing or producing these materials is covered by the church and the materials are distributed for free. The church also runs a large family history organization which collects records of genealogical import from many archives worldwide and allows online family tree collaboration. It also creates and publishes curriculum and audio/video (church films, etc.),

=== Volunteer labor ===
In 1995, the church's human resources department estimated that the 96,484 volunteers serving at the time contributed services having an annual value of $360 million. Church members volunteer general custodial work for local church facilities.

=== Political campaigns ===
The church spends some of its funds on political campaigns, such as funding efforts to support Proposition 8 in California. It does not donate directly to candidates or political parties.

== Assets ==
Time magazine estimated in 1996 that the church's assets exceeded $30 billion. Three years later, annual revenues were estimated to be $5 billion, with total assets at $25 to $30 billion.

In 2023, the Widow's Mite estimated the church's net worth (and therefore a minimum valuation of its assets) to be around $265 billion.

=== Ensign Peak Advisors ===
Ensign Peak Advisors, Inc. (EP) was founded as the LDS Church's investment division in the 1960s and was still considered to be a "shoestring operation" into the 1990s. By 2020, it managed about $100 billion in assets.

In 2019, a former EP employee made a whistleblower report to the IRS alleging that the church held over $100 billion of assets in a large investment fund. Prior to this disclosure, the scope of EP's holdings had not been publicly reported. The whistleblower further alleged that the church-operated fund failed to use its revenues for charitable purposes and instead used them in for-profit ventures; and that it misled contributors and the public about the usage and extent of those funds. According to the whistleblower, applicable law requires the funds be used for religious, educational or other charitable purposes for the fund to maintain its tax-exempt status. The $100 billion net worth exceeds the combined net worths of the world's largest university endowment (Harvard University) and the world's largest philanthropic foundation (Gates Foundation). Other commentators have argued that such expenditures may not be legally required as claimed.

In response to the allegations, the church's First Presidency stated that "the Church complies with all applicable law governing our donations, investments, taxes, and reserves," and that "a portion" of funds received by the church are "methodically safeguarded through wise financial management and the building of a prudent reserve for the future."

==== 2023 SEC investigation and penalty ====
In February 2023, the U.S. Securities and Exchange Commission (SEC) found that Ensign and the LDS Church had used 13 different shell LLCs across the United States to avoid disclosing an increase in their investment portfolio value from $7 billion to approximately $37.8 billion from 1997 to 2019. As a result, Ensign was penalized $4 million and the church was penalized $1 million. The existence of the shell companies was made public in 2018 by the website MormonLeaks which noticed that the shell company websites were hosted on church servers.

=== Real estate and farmland ===
Behind [the Church's real estate] holdings is a highly sophisticated investment operation more akin to a sovereign wealth fund than a religious institution, according to brokers and investors who have worked with the church. They describe a savvy organization that makes acquisitions with the intent to own property for generations, while also increasingly putting money into higher-return investments.

Long known for its farmland and temple sites, the church is starting to get more involved in housing and master-planned communities — putting in some cases decades-old land holdings to work in high-growth areas including Colorado, Florida and Arizona. That’s thrusting the church into the politics of building, with projects drawing debates over everything from water and infrastructure to environmental preservation and local control.

— Bloomberg Finance

The church owns AgReserves, the largest producer of nuts in the United States (circa. 1997) AgReserves has agreed to lease up to 3,710 acres to developer Aetheris for a large data center in west Texas.

Through its subsidiary Farmland Reserve Inc., the church owns at least 370,000 acres (578 square miles) in Nebraska (up from 228,000 acres in 2004) and 51,600 acres in Osage County, Oklahoma; In 2021, church subsidiary AgriNorthwest outbid Cascade Investment to purchase 12,000 acres of farmland and associated water rights in Eastern Washington, adding to 100,000 acres it already owned in Washington and Oregon.

In 2022 after performing an investigation, the Truth & Transparency Foundation asserted the church owns the most valuable real estate portfolio in the United States, with a minimum market value of $15.7 billion. In 2026, Bloomberg News reviewed publicly available property records, and found the church's holdings totaled greater than $20 billion.

==== Property Reserve ====
Property Reserve, Inc. (PRI) is the LDS Church's real estate investment arm. Its holdings include offices, warehouses, apartments, lodging, land, mixed-use, single-family rentals, and parking structures. "In the spirit of self-reliance," PRI states they attempt "to create reliable funds to help facilitate the Church’s ecclesiastical and humanitarian missions and prepare for the future needs of its membership."

Utah Property Management Associates (UPMA, formerly Zions Securities Corporation) is a subsidiary of PRI and manages/operates properties owned by the church.

Hawaii Reserves, Inc. (HRI) is the subsidiary of PRI that manages property for the LDS Church in the town of Laie, Hawaii. HRI manages more than 7,000 acres of land in the Laie area—most purchased in 1865. HRI manages commercial properties, private campgrounds, lands in the Laie area, and a number of infrastructure projects. These properties include the Laie Water Company and the Laie Treatment Works, as well as the Laie Shopping Center, Laie Park, Laie Cemetery, and Hukilau Beach Park. HRI also owns many residential properties in the town as well as road management and public works service. When combined with the Polynesian Cultural Center (the leading paid visitor attraction in Hawaii) and BYU–Hawaii, LDS Church-related entities generated revenue of $260 million for the Hawaii economy in 2005.

Another subsidiary is Land Reserve, an entity focused on master-planned community development. Known master-planned developments include:

- A 3,000 acre development outside Kyle, Texas. Plans have called for 7,300 houses and hundreds of acres of commercial space, in what would be one of Texas' largest master-planned communities. A six year lawsuit over the development was settled in 2026.
- Tributary, a 960-acre project near Denver International Airport. 12,000 houses are planned.
- 3,000 acres near Austin, TX, "where [the church] obtained development rights for thousands of homes."
- 4,000 acres near Phoenix, AZ, on land "accumulated since the 1980s."
- Sunbridge, on 27,000 acres, previously part of Deseret Ranches, in central Florida. Up to 36,000 homes are planned, of which 1,400 are completed as of 2026.

PRI's multifamily residential holdings in South Florida include: Uptown Boca Villas (Boca Raton, 2026, $240 million, 456 units); Del Ola (Boca Raton, 2025, $152.5 million, 384 units); Elan Polo Gardens (unincorporated Palm Beach County, 2025, $102.4 million, 284 units); and Ellsworth (Plantation, 2024, $133 million, 315 units). PRI also paid $174.3 million for an industrial park in Hialeah, Florida in or around January 2024. In 2018, PRI bought a 40-story, 397-unit high-rise unit in Chicago's South Loop neighborhood.

In 2024, PRI (through its subsidiary Alkira Farms) bought $300m AUD ($203m USD) worth of farmland in Australia. At the time, a church representative stated "Australian agriculture continues to be an attractive proposition for both domestic and global investors, providing genuine portfolio differentiation in a region that has a strong reputation globally. We are excited by the opportunities available in Australian agriculture and continue to see value from an investment in the sector that has the potential to drive strong returns into the future."

==== Deseret Ranches ====
Deseret Cattle and Citrus Ranch east of Orlando, Florida, the world's largest beef ranch, is located on over 670,000 acres (1,046 mi^{2}) in Florida. The land is worth an estimated $858 million (as of 1997). The ranch maintains a herd of approximately 45,000 beef cattle, and over 200,000 citrus trees.

The ranch is home to more than 350 species of wildlife, including almost 250 species of birds. Sandhill cranes and the threatened wood stork flourish in the area. Other species of wildlife include white-tailed deer, American alligator, Osceola turkey, wild hog, Florida bass and nesting bald eagles. The ranch has created and manages one of the state's largest wood stork rookeries, a breeding ground for the threatened birds.

The church has plans to develop a large portion of the ranch into more than a dozen neighborhoods for approximately half a million residents.

=== Additional holdings ===
The following is a partial list of assets of other types known to be owned or controlled by the LDS Church:

- Deseret Management Corporation - a holding company whose subsidiaries include:
  - Beneficial Financial Group - An insurance and financial services company with assets of $3.1 billion.
  - Deseret Book Company - a publisher and bookstore operator
  - Bonneville International - the 14th largest radio chain in the U.S.
  - Deseret News - a weekly Utah newspaper and digital news operation, second-largest in the state of Utah.
- City Creek Center - shopping mall in Salt Lake City, Utah.
- Polynesian Cultural Center - family-centered cultural tourist attraction and living museum in Laie, Hawaii.
- The Grove on Main - mixed-use development near the Mesa, AZ temple, completed in 2021.

The church is also known to own banks, hotels and restaurants, forestry and mining operations, and transportation and railway companies.

== Tax avoidance and alleged tax evasion ==
The church has legally transferred more than a billion dollars of tithing collected in Canada to US church universities over the course of 15 years, tax-free.

An independent analysis in 2025 found "strong evidence" of tax evasion by Ensign Peak Advisors from 2003 to 2017. The tax amount allegedly evaded was up to $90 million, based on underreporting of income to the IRS by $450 million.

== See also ==
- Deseret Industries
- Deseret Manufacturing Company
- Utah Property Management Associates
- Utah-Idaho Sugar Company
- Zions Bancorporation
- Zion's Central Board of Trade
- LDS Charities
