= AgReserves =

Multinational agriculture private company

AgReserves Inc.
- Type: Private company
- Industry: Agriculture
- Founded: 1950; 76 years ago
- Headquarters: Salt Lake City, Utah 84111, United States
- Key people: Doug Rose (CEO), W. Christopher Waddell (Presiding Bishop)
- Products: Agricultural land owner
- Owner: LDS Church
- Website: www.agreserves.com

AgReserves, Inc. (AgReserves) is a multinational agriculture for-profit company ultimately owned by the Church of Jesus Christ of Latter-day Saints (LDS Church) and based in Salt Lake City, Utah.

AgReserves has three divisions which operate in more than 30 states, along with international operations in Argentina, Brazil, Chile, Mexico, Canada, and the United Kingdom. The three divisions include Ranches (dairy and beef with integrated supply chain trace-ability), Permanent Plantings (farming of almonds, pistachios, walnuts, pecan, olives, citrus), and Row Crops (farming of corn, wheat, alfalfa, carrots, corn, peas, onions, potatoes). As of 2021, Doug Rose is the CEO of AgReserves.

Deseret Ranches, part of the Ranches division of AgReserves, encompasses 295,000-acres and extends across Orange, Osceola and Brevard counties and is seen as critical to the Orlando region's water supply. The ranch is home to about a quarter million citrus trees, timberland, tree farms, commercial crops, and large deposits of fossilized seashells used in road base.

In 2013, AgReserves purchased 382,834 acres from St. Joe Company in Bay, Calhoun, Franklin, Gadsden, Gulf, Jefferson, Leon, Liberty and Wakulla counties. The land, primarily timberland, was purchased for $565 million. As of 2014, the LDS Church was Florida's largest private landowner. AgReserves also owns substantial agricultural land in the United Kingdom. In 2020, AgReserves sold more than 20,000 acres of land surrounding Lake Wimico in Florida to The Nature Conservancy who then donated the land to the state and the Florida Department of Environmental Protection.

== Associated Business Units ==
The AgReserves primary website does not provide information on the operating arms or the regional distinctions of its subsidiary business units. The confusion can be illustrated by an article referencing the Easterday Companies purchase where FarmlandReserve is depicted as a parent company of AgReserves, and AgriNorthwest is a subsidiary of AgReserves.

Businesses Related to AgReserves or other agricultural business units of the LDS Church include the following:

=== United States ===
- Farmland Reserve
- Farm Management Co.
- Deseret Ranches (Florida Trees, Fruit, and Cattle)
- Deseret Land and Livestock (Utah)
- AgriNorthwest

=== Outside the United States ===
- Farmland Reserve UK Ltd
- AgReserves Australia

== See also ==
- Finances of the Church of Jesus Christ of Latter-day Saints
