= Temple Square Hospitality =

American subsidiary of Deseret Management Corporation

Temple Square Hospitality Corporation
- Company type: Subsidiary
- Industry: Hospitality
- Founded: November 7, 1988; 37 years ago
- Founder: Presiding Bishopric of The Church of Jesus Christ of Latter-day Saints
- Headquarters: Salt Lake City, Utah, United States
- Key people: Gary Porter (President / CEO); Clark Stenquist (VP / Controller)
- Services: Weddings; Floristry; Business gatherings Catering; Restaurants; Tourism
- Parent: Deseret Management Corporation
- Website: templesquarehospitality.com

Temple Square Hospitality Corporation is a subsidiary of Deseret Management Corporation which provides dining, catering and other services at the Lion House, Joseph Smith Memorial Building, and other properties owned by Zions Securities Corporation near Temple Square in downtown Salt Lake City, Utah. The company caters parties, weddings, and corporate events.

== History ==
Temple Square Hospitality Corporation can trace its history back to Utah Hotel Company, which was formed to build the Hotel Utah, which was completed in 1911.

On September 11, 1973 the presiding bishop of the LDS Church announced that the Utah Hotel Company had acquired a small hotel on the corner of West Temple and South Temple known as Hotel Temple Square. Hotel Temple Square was originally built in the 1930s and was owned by Zions Securities.

On June 15, 1984 the Utah Hotel Company announced a management agreement with Westin Hotels and Resorts to operate the Hotel Utah. At that time the name was changed to The Westin Hotel Utah, Salt Lake City.

A feasibility study was done on The Westin Hotel Utah, which determined the building would close as a hotel and be converted to office space for LDS Church. This change was announced by the church's First Presidency on March 12, 1987. In August 1987 The Westin Hotel Utah closed. The Utah Hotel Company was dissolved and sold all its assets to the Temple Square Hotel Division of Proprietary Holding Company.

During the next twelve months, a subsequent feasibility study on Temple Square Hotel concluded it was best to renovate it into a first class small hotel. On October 31, 1988 Temple Square Hotel closed for renovations. On November 7, 1988 a new corporation was formed called Hotel Temple Square Corporation. This new corporation purchased all the remaining assets of the Temple Square Hotel Division of Proprietary Holding Company and began approximately a two-year renovation of the Temple Square Hotel into what was known as The Inn at Temple Square.

Hotel Temple Square Corporation's first president was Robert D. Hales, with H. David Burton as the general manager. Then in April 1994 David R. Webster succeeded H. David Burton as general manager. In 1997 David Webster resigned as president to pursue other interests and Brent Shingleton was appointed as the third President/CEO of Hotel Temple Square Corporation.

On January 1, 1989 Hotel Temple Square Corporation purchased the business enterprise known as The Lion House from the LDS Church and began running the catering and restaurant operations as a taxable commercial enterprise.

In October 1990 the renovation of The Inn at Temple Square was completed and opened to the general public.

In June 1993 the renovation of the building known as The Westin Hotel Utah, Salt Lake City was completed. The building was opened and given the name of Joseph Smith Memorial Building. Included in the building were offices of the LDS Church, along with food services facilities. These food service facilities consisted of two restaurants and extensive banquet space. Hotel Temple Square Corporation entered into an agreement to lease the food service facilities and began operation of The Garden Restaurant, The Roof Restaurant and Smith Catering.

The articles of incorporation of Hotel Temple Square Corporation were amended to rename the corporation to Temple Square Hospitality Corporation on December 4, 2002.

In 2004, it had nearly 550 employees and managed four restaurants. Temple Square Hospitality Corporation managed The Inn at Temple Square until 2006 when it was demolished as part of the City Creek Center plan. It had refurbished The Inn at Temple Square in 1988 to turn the 1931 structure into a 90-room Victorian-style hotel.
