= H. David Burton =

American LDS Church leader (born 1938)

Emeritus general authority
- March 31, 2012

Presiding Bishop
- December 27, 1995 – March 31, 2012
- End reason: Granted general authority emeritus status

First Counselor in the Presiding Bishopric
- October 3, 1992 – December 27, 1995
- End reason: Reorganization (due to Merrill J. Bateman becoming president of BYU

Personal details
- Born: Harold David Burton; April 26, 1938 (age 88); Salt Lake City, Utah, United States
- Alma mater: University of Michigan
- Spouse(s): Barbara Matheson
- Children: 5

Harold David Burton (born April 25, 1938) was the thirteenth Presiding Bishop of the Church of Jesus Christ of Latter-day Saints (LDS Church) from 1995 to 2012 and has been the chairman of the University of Utah (U of U) board of trustees since 2016.

Born in Salt Lake City, Utah, to Latter-day Saint parents, Burton graduated from South High School in 1956 and then served as a missionary for the LDS Church in southern Australia in the late 1950s. He graduated from the U of U with a bachelor's degree in economics and completed an MBA from the University of Michigan. Early in his career, Burton worked for the Utah Tax Commission and for Kennecott Copper.

== LDS Church service ==
Burton was hired by the LDS Church as the assistant budget officer in 1977. Burton later accepted a position as the executive secretary to the church's presiding bishopric. In October 1992, Burton was called by Robert D. Hales as first counselor in the presiding bishopric. In 1994, he was again called as first counselor to the new presiding bishop, Merrill J. Bateman. On December 27, 1995, when Bateman became the president of Brigham Young University, Burton became the church's Presiding Bishop--a post roughly equivalent to chief operating officer. Burton called Richard C. Edgley as his first counselor and Keith B. McMullin as his second counselor.

Burton was a prominent voice from the LDS Church on the issue of Utah immigration legislation in 2011. Burton oversaw the LDS Church's $1.5 billion mixed-use development project called City Creek Center in downtown Salt Lake City. Burton and his counselors were released on 31 March 2012 and designated as emeritus general authorities.

== Civic service ==
In 2014, Burton was elected chairman of the board of the Utah Transit Authority. He has been on the U of U's board of trustees since 2013 and was selected as chairman in 2016. While chair, the U of U joined the prestigious Association of American Universities prompting Burton to remark, "We already knew that the U was one of the jewels of Utah and of the Intermountain West, this invitation shows that we are one of the jewels of the entire nation".

== Personal life ==
Burton married Barbara Matheson in September 1960, and they are the parents of five children.

== See also ==
- Council on the Disposition of the Tithes
- Finances of The Church of Jesus Christ of Latter-day Saints

== Selected BYU Speeches ==
H. David Burton delivered several devotional addresses at Brigham Young University, covering topics on discipleship, character, and faith:

- "Living Water and the Atoning Blood of Jesus Christ" – January 9, 2000
- "What Manner of Men and Women Ought Ye to Be?" – November 2, 2008
- "These Are the Times" – December 1, 2009

The Church of Jesus Christ of Latter-day Saints titles
Preceded by Merrill J. Bateman	Presiding Bishop; December 27, 1995 – March 31, 2012	Succeeded by Gary E. Stevenson
Preceded by Henry B. Eyring	First Counselor in the Presiding Bishopric; October 3, 1992 – December 27, 1995	Succeeded by Richard C. Edgley
