= Deseret Management Corporation =

For-profit managing company of the LDS Church

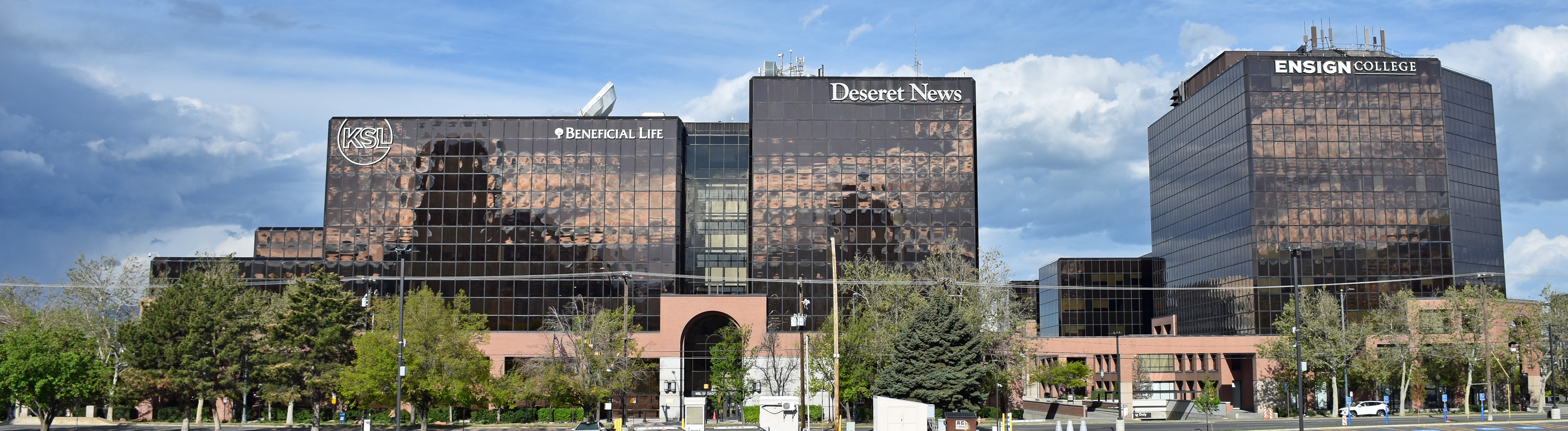
- The Triad Center serves as headquarters for DMC and many of its subsidiaries
- Type: Private
- Industry: Asset management company
- Founded: 1966; 60 years ago
- Founder: The Church of Jesus Christ of Latter-day Saints
- Headquarters: Salt Lake City, Utah, United States
- Key people: Jeff Simpson (President); Sheri Dew (CCO); Kirby Brown (CFO); Gary B. Porter (Senior Vice President); Aaron Sherinian (Senior Vice President Global Reach); David Pearce (Senior Vice President and General Counsel)
- Owner: The Church of Jesus Christ of Latter-day Saints
- Divisions: Deseret Digital Media; Deseret Media Companies; KSL Broadcast Division
- Subsidiaries: Beneficial Financial Group; Bonneville International Corp. Deseret News; Deseret Book; Hawaii Reserves; Temple Square Hospitality
- Website: www.deseretmanagement.com

Deseret Management Corporation (DMC) (/ˌdɛzəˈrɛt/) is an American operating company, managing select global, for-profit entities affiliated with the Church of Jesus Christ of Latter-day Saints (LDS Church). It was established in 1966 by church president David O. McKay to hold already-existing church media assets. DMC companies provide content, services, and information through a diverse portfolio of companies, with the majority being media and communications brands.

== Subsidiaries ==
The following are DMC subsidiaries:

- Beneficial Financial Group: insurance, investment, and retirement services.
- Bonneville International Corporation: owns radio stations nationwide, Bonneville Interactive, and Bonneville Satellite Company.
- Bonneville Communications (Boncom): Advertising agency.
- Deseret Book: publisher of church-related materials and bookstore chain.
- Deseret News Publishing Company: Publishes Utah's second-largest daily newspaper, the Deseret News, along with the Church News and El Observador.
- Temple Square Hospitality: operates Church-owned downtown Salt Lake City properties such as the Lion House and the Joseph Smith Memorial Building.
- Deseret Digital Media: Operates select web sites of other DMC media companies, including ksl.com.
- The Church of Jesus Christ of Latter-day Saints Foundation: A non-profit foundation that donates the profits of other DMC companies to various charitable causes, both in Utah and internationally.

== Divisions ==
- KSL Broadcast Division: Operates KSL-TV & KSL Newsradio in Salt Lake City, Utah, for the Bonneville International Corporation.

== Leadership ==
In November 2023, previous executive Jeff Simpson was selected to replace previous CEO and President, Keith B. McMullin.

== Relation to the LDS Church ==
DMC is the holding company which owns the tax-paying companies that fall under the umbrella of the LDS Church. DMC's Board of Directors may include the Church's First Presidency, rotating members of the Quorum of the Twelve, and the Presiding Bishopric.

== See also ==
- Finances of The Church of Jesus Christ of Latter-day Saints
- Intellectual Reserve
