= One Spark =

One Spark may refer to:

- "One Spark" (song), the 2024 song by the South Korean girl group Twice
- One Spark, the 2011 album by Gabe Dixon
- One Spark (event), the fundraising event that ran from 2013 to 2018 in Florida

== See also ==
- "One Little Spark", the song that plays on Journey into Imagination with Figment, an amusement ride
