= Deseret Digital Media =

Digital asset holding company

Deseret Digital Media, Inc.
- Company type: Private
- Industry: New media
- Founded: Salt Lake City, Utah, United States (September 24, 2009)
- Headquarters: Salt Lake City, Utah, United States
- Area served: Utah
- Key people: Nate Hatch (President, 2021–present)
- Brands: KSL.com, Utah.com
- Number of employees: 150+
- Parent: Deseret Management Corporation
- Website: www.deseretdigital.com

Deseret Digital Media, Inc. (DDM) is a subsidiary company of Deseret Management Corporation (DMC), an American holding company owned by the Church of Jesus Christ of Latter-day Saints (LDS Church). DDM owns digital assets, primarily focused on the Utah news and classifieds site KSL.com and tourism site Utah.com.

The company's first CEO, Clark Gilbert, served from DDM's founding in 2009 until 2015 when he was named president of BYU-Idaho. Gilbert later became an LDS Church general authority and as of 2024 continues to serve as the commissioner of the Church Educational System. Greg Peterson was DDM's president from 2016 to 2021. As of 2024, the president is Nate Hatch, a former Assistant Vice President of Technology at Brigham Young University.

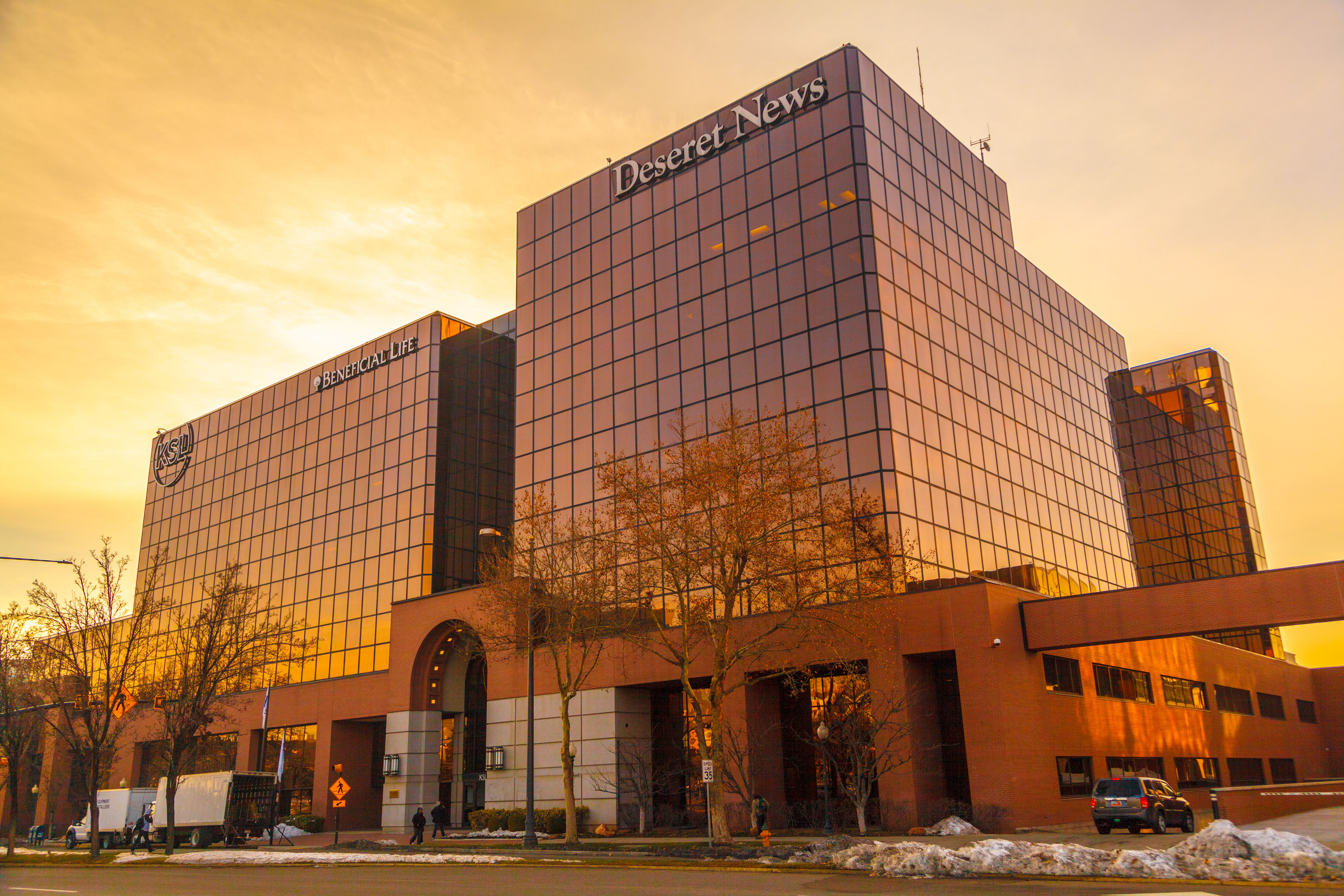
The Triad Center in Salt Lake City, Utah, headquarters for Deseret Media

DDM was formed in 2009 to run the website operations of DMC. Since then, Deseret News has resumed operations of its website and DDM operates KSL.com aside from Bonneville International's digital assets.

== KSL.com classifieds ==
KSL Classifieds is a classified advertisements website covering northern and southern Utah and nearby parts of Idaho and Wyoming. It is one of the largest classifieds sites in the U.S. and the only one to draw more users than Craigslist within its local market.

=== History ===
KSL Classifieds was launched in 2000 by broadcaster KSL TV and KSL Newsradio, despite the misgivings of KSL executives who resisted the idea of making ads free for individual users, and despite the fact it would be competing with paid classifieds in the Deseret News, which is also owned by DMC. It claims to be the first broadcast site to offer free classified ads, and one of the first to stream content from television and radio. As its launch predated Craigslist's expansion into Utah by four years, it was able to use the network effect to build its online presence during that time.

=== Controversies ===
Gun control activists raised concerns in 2011 that KSL Classifieds did a disservice to its community by providing a marketplace for sellers who were not licensed dealers, since these sellers do not need to perform background checks on buyers. A 2011 report from the office of New York City mayor Michael Bloomberg found that KSL Classifieds had more gun listings than any other general-purpose online marketplace, exceeded only by online marketplaces that specialize in guns. KSL Classifieds discontinued gun listings in the wake of the Sandy Hook Elementary School shooting.

In 2023, KSL Classifieds announced changes to their Dogs and Cats classifieds listings to reduce fraud, irresponsible breeders and pet sellers, and better educate users via partnerships with local Humane Societies.
