= Peter Rummell =

American entrepreneur, investor and businessman

- Born: October 13, 1945 (age 80)
- Education: University of North Carolina; Wharton Business School
- Occupations: Former Company President & CEO; Investor
- Spouse: Lee Ann Wilson
- Children: Mahala Hunter (born 1992); Harry Stevenson II (born 1994)

Peter Stevenson Rummell (born October 13, 1945) is an American real estate businessman. He has held senior positions at several companies, heading two branches of The Walt Disney Company and as CEO of the St. Joe Company. Disney's planned community of Celebration, Florida was his brainchild. He is a founding board member and the primary financial backer of One Spark, a crowdfunding festival in Jacksonville, Florida.

== Education ==
Rummell attended The Hill School in Pottstown, Pennsylvania, then completed his undergraduate education in 1967 with an Artium Baccalaureus (AB) degree in English literature with a Chemistry double major from the University of North Carolina at Chapel Hill. His first job involved selling laboratory equipment to hospitals, and he realized that he was not a salesman. Friends attending the Wharton Business School at the University of Pennsylvania encouraged him to join them, so he enrolled there and received an MBA in 1971. Another friend from Wharton invited him to visit Hilton Head Island, South Carolina, where he met developer Charles Fraser, who offered Rummell a job.

== Early career ==
Rummell began his real estate career with the Sea Pines Company in 1971, where he was involved in the development of resort communities on Hilton Head and Amelia Island, Florida. Beginning in 1977, he was with the Arvida Corporation, where he was general manager of the Sawgrass development in Ponte Vedra Beach, Florida. In 1983, he was named vice chairman of Rockefeller Center Management, which markets, leases and manages the 18 buildings in midtown Manhattan that encompass Rockefeller Center in New York City. Rummell left in 1985 to become president of Disney Development Company. At Disney, he helped manage the company's theme park and resort development, including Walt Disney World in Orlando, and was a driving force behind the 5,000-acre, 20,000-person planned community of Celebration, Florida. Rummell pitched the idea to Disney CEO Michael Eisner in 1989 and described his vision of Celebration:

[a] wonderful residential town east of I-4 that has a human scale with sidewalks and bicycles and parks and the kind of architecture that is sophisticated and timeless. It will have fiber optics and smart houses, but the feel will in many cases be closer to Main Street than to Future World.

The division also managed the company's holdings adjacent to theme parks in Anaheim, Orlando, Tokyo and Paris.

Rummell was promoted to chairman of Walt Disney Imagineering and remained with the company until 1997, when he was hired by St. Joe Company in Jacksonville, Florida to transform Florida's largest landowner into a major developer. As chairman and CEO, he guided the company to plan and develop 20 major resort and residential communities. He left the company in May 2008 and was briefly president of Nicklaus Companies.

From 2003 to 2006 Rummell wason the board of directors of Progress Energy and Carolina Power & Light; he is on the board of The Haskell Company. In September 2007, Rummell was named a director of Real estate investment trust AvalonBay Communities due to his extensive experience in real estate development, and is currently a private investor.

== Civic involvement ==
Rummell was co-chairman of Jacksonville's host committee that was successful in their quest to have the city selected for Super Bowl XXXIX in 2005.

He was an Urban Land Institute officer and trustee who was also chairman of the ULI Foundation in the 2000s. Rummell was a member of the Jacksonville Non-Group, which evolved into the Jacksonville Civic Council in 2010. He was the first president of the new organization.

He chaired the Florida Council of 100 from 2005 to 2007, a group that advises the governor on issues confronting the state from a business point of view. From 2003 to 2006, Rummell was appointed by governor Jeb Bush as a member of the Florida Board of Governors, which provides policy oversight of the university system for the State of Florida.

In 2013, Rummell became the primary financial backer of One Spark, a five-day crowdfunding festival held in Downtown Jacksonville.

== Personal life ==
Peter and his wife, Lee Ann, have two children: Mahala Hunter (born 1992) and Harry Stevenson II (born 1994). They reside primarily in Jacksonville, Florida.
