= Religion Unplugged =

Non-profit news organisation

- Type: Nonprofit
- Fields: Religion
- Official language: English
- Website: religionunplugged.com

Religion Unplugged is a non-profit news organization covering "religion in public life and in people's lives." It was founded in 2019.

Religion Unplugged is a member of the Institute for Nonprofit News, a network of independent and nonpartisan news organizations. The website has received numerous awards from Editor & Publisher, Religion News Association, SABEW and other organizations.

In 2019, Religion Unplugged broke the story of a whistleblower complaint against Ensign Peak Advisors, the investment manager for assets of the Church of Jesus Christ of Latter-day Saints.

Clemente Lisi has served as executive editor since 2023.

== See also ==
- Institute for Nonprofit News (member)
