= Gérald Caussé =

French religious leader (born 1963)

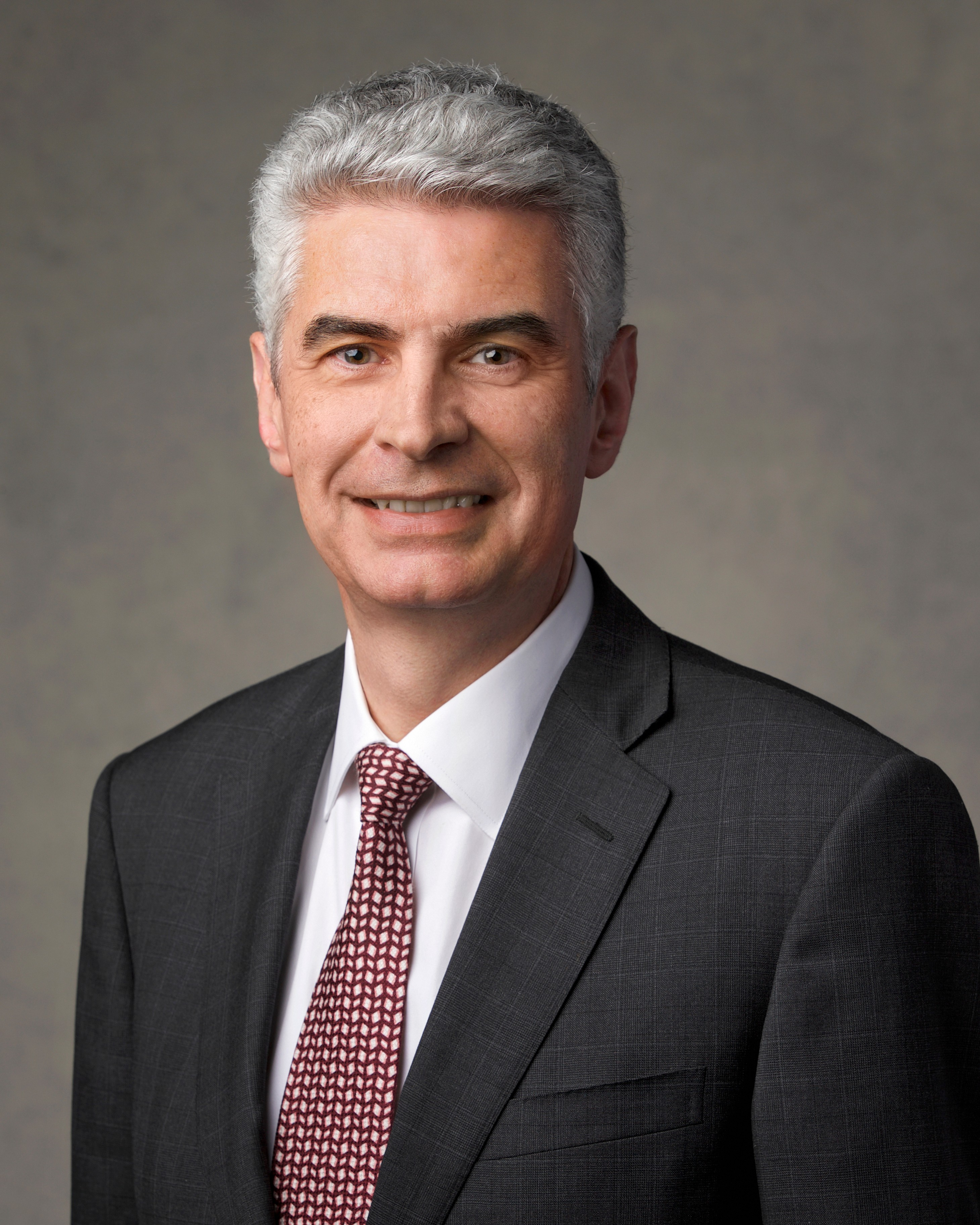

Quorum of the Twelve Apostles
- November 6, 2025
- Called by: Dallin H. Oaks

LDS Church Apostle
- November 6, 2025
- Called by: Dallin H. Oaks
- Reason: Death of Russell M. Nelson, reorganization of the First Presidency

Presiding Bishop
- 9 October 2015 – 6 November 2025
- Called by: Thomas S. Monson
- Predecessor: Gary E. Stevenson
- Successor: W. Christopher Waddell
- End reason: Called to the Quorum of the Twelve Apostles

First Counselor in the Presiding Bishopric
- 31 March 2012 – 9 October 2015
- Called by: Gary E. Stevenson
- Predecessor: Richard C. Edgley
- Successor: Dean M. Davies
- End reason: Called to be Presiding Bishop

First Quorum of the Seventy
- 5 April 2008 – 31 March 2012
- Called by: Thomas S. Monson
- End reason: Called to be First Counselor in the Presiding Bishopric

Personal details
- Born: Gérald Jean Caussé; 20 May 1963 (age 63); Bordeaux, France
- Alma mater: ESSEC Business School
- Spouse(s): Valérie Lucienne Babin (m. 1986)
- Children: 5

Gérald Jean Caussé (born 20 May 1963) is a French religious leader and member of the Quorum of the Twelve Apostles of the Church of Jesus Christ of Latter-day Saints. He has been a general authority of the church since 2008, and was the first ever appointed from France. As a member of the Quorum of the Twelve, Caussé is accepted by the church as a prophet, seer, and revelator. Currently, he is the fourteenth most senior apostle in the church.

Caussé was born in Bordeaux. He served for a year in the French Air Force and later earned a master's degree in business from ESSEC Business School. He worked as a strategy consultant and later served as general manager. Caussé has held numerous positions in the church throughout his life and was called as an apostle on November 6, 2025. He has been married to Valérie Lucienne Babin since 1986, and they have five children.

== Church service ==
Caussé was president of the church's Paris France Stake from 2001 to 2007. In April 2007, he became an area seventy in the church's Europe West Area. On 5 April 2008, Caussé became a member of the church's First Quorum of the Seventy. For most of his four years as a member of the First Quorum of the Seventy, Caussé served in the presidency of the church's Europe Area.

On March 31, 2012, he was called to serve as the first counselor to Gary E. Stevenson in the Presiding Bishopric. When Stevenson was called to the Quorum of the Twelve Apostles in October 2015, Caussé succeeded him as the church's presiding bishop. Under the direction of the First Presidency, the Presiding Bishopric is tasked with general oversight of many of the church's day-to-day operations. Among other areas of management, this includes the construction and maintenance of church meetinghouse facilities around the world.

Caussé served on the Church Board of Education and Boards of Trustees from 2017 until his call to the apostleship. Humanitarian aid and charitable giving increased under Caussé's leadership, reaching nearly $1 billion per year. In 2020 Caussé addressed the controversy surrounding the church's investments, managed by Ensign Peak Advisors, "It is a church. It's not a financial institution . . . and because it is a church, the funds that are managed within the church are contributed by the members of the church and are really sacred. We really consider those funds as belonging to the Lord."

On November 6, 2025, Caussé was set apart as a member of the Quorum of the Twelve Apostles, filling a vacancy left by the death of recent church president Russell M. Nelson, the appointment of Dallin H. Oaks to succeed him, and the appointment of D. Todd Christofferson to the First Presidency.

== Personal life ==
Caussé married Valérie Lucienne Babin on August 5, 1986 in the Bern Switzerland Temple. They are the parents of five children. Caussé plays the piano and has produced three albums together with Italian composer Nicolas Giusti—Joyful (2019), Noël (2020), and As a Child (2023).

The Church of Jesus Christ of Latter-day Saints titles
Preceded by Patrick Kearon	Quorum of the Twelve Apostles; November 6, 2025 – present	Succeeded by Clark G. Gilbert
Preceded by Gary E. Stevenson	Presiding Bishop; October 9, 2015 – November 6, 2025	Succeeded by W. Christopher Waddell
Preceded by Richard C. Edgley	First Counselor in the Presiding Bishopric; March 31, 2012 – October 9, 2015	Succeeded by Dean M. Davies
