= Hawaii Reserves =

Hawaiian property management company

Hawaii Reserves, Inc.
- Founded: 1993
- Type: Private
- Headquarters: Laie, Hawaii, United States
- Services: Property management
- Owner: Corporation of the President of The Church of Jesus Christ of Latter-day Saints
- President: R. Eric Ho'olulukamakani Beaver
- Presiding Bishop: Gérald Caussé
- Website: https://www.hawaiireserves.com

Hawaii Reserves, Inc. (Hawaii Reserves) is the subsidiary of Property Reserve Inc. that manages property for the Church of Jesus Christ of Latter-day Saints (LDS Church) in the town of Laie, Hawaii.

Hawaii Reserves manages more than 7,000 acres of land in the Laie area—most purchased in 1865. Hawaii Reserves manages commercial properties, private campgrounds, lands in the Laie area, and a number of infrastructure projects. These properties include the Laie Water Company and the Laie Treatment Works, as well as the Laie Shopping Center, Laie Park, Laie Cemetery, and Hukilau Beach Park. Hawaii Reserves also owns many residential properties in the town as well as road management and public works service.

The current president of Hawaii Reserves is R. Eric Ho'olulukamakani Beaver.

The Laie Hawaii Temple was the first LDS temple built outside the continental United States. Laie is also home to Brigham Young University-Hawaii, part of the LDS Church's educational system. In 2004 Hawaii Reserves spent $5.5 million renovating Hale Laa Boulevard, the wide avenue that leads to the temple.

== See also ==
- Finances of The Church of Jesus Christ of Latter-day Saints
