= One Spark (event) =

Annual crowdfunding festival in Florida

- Genre: Crowdfunding
- Dates: April 6–7, 2016
- Frequency: Annual
- Location: Jacksonville, Florida
- Years active: 13
- Inaugurated: 2013
- Founders: Elton Rivas, Dennis Eusebio, Varick Rosete
- Most recent: 2018
- Attendance: 320,000 (2015)
- Organizer: One Spark, Inc.

One Spark was an annual crowdfunding festival held in Downtown Jacksonville, Florida, United States. In the event, creators displayed projects in various categories (including art, innovation, music, science, social good, and technology) and crowdfunded from attendees. The event also offered opportunities for private investment in projects, as well as speakers, music, and entertainment. The event launched in 2013.

== History ==
=== Development ===
One Spark was conceived in 2011 by Elton Rivas, Dennis Eusebio, and Varick Rosete, three young professionals involved in Jacksonville's start up scene. Inspired by Brad Feld's book Startup Communities, Rivas wanted to develop Jacksonville's start up culture rather than moving elsewhere. The organizers modelled One Spark after events like ArtPrize and South by Southwest, planning a festival where inventors, entrepreneurs, and artists could present their projects, with attendees voting on which ones would receive the prize money.

The project gained momentum when the organizers of a similar proposed event, an arts festival to be called the Epoch Project, suspended operations in June 2012 due to lack of funds and endorsed One Spark. One Spark achieved its goal of $300,000 in private donations in August 2012, and was able to hire a full-time staff to organize the event. By October, they had secured sponsors for $250,000 in prize money, and raised $90,000 to underwrite event costs via Kickstarter. The primary financial backer was former Disney and St. Joe Company executive Peter Rummell, who contributed $750,000 to the project.

=== Events ===
The first One Spark was held from April 17–21, 2013, and featured the work of about 900 "creators", which were displayed in venues across Downtown Jacksonville. The festival attracted an estimated crowd of 130,000 over five days. For 2014, the festival increased the payout, adding juried prizes and bonus awards to the crowdfunded amount. Additionally, a group of investors led by Jacksonville Jaguars owner Shad Khan pledged an amount up to $3.25 million in private investments in individual projects. The event ran from April 9–13, 2014.

Founders Rivas, Eusebio and Rosete served on One Spark's board of directors. Jacksonville marketing executive Joe Sampson replaced Rivas as executive director in 2013.

== One Spark 2013 ==
One Spark's inaugural event was held from April 9–13, 2014 had 130,000 attendees, 59 venues, 900 creators with 406 participating creator projects, 553 trained volunteers, and over 53,000 unique votes distributing the $250,000 crowdfund. Creators had access to this crowdfund by receiving votes from the festival visitors.

The festival was held in downtown Jacksonville, Florida, from April 17–21, 2013. The event featured pitch decks, where successful entrepreneurs shared their experience, music stages, food and beer villages.

Winners are...

== One Spark 2014 ==
One Spark's second event was held April 9–13, 2014 and had an attendance of 260,000 people with 610 creators. 120,493 votes were cast distributing $310,000.

=== One Spark Berlin ===
In 2014, the festival's organizers announced a second event, One Spark START: Berlin, would be held from September 12–13, 2014 in Berlin's Mitte area. Former Jacksonville resident Travis Todd serves as managing director. Unlike the Jacksonville event's street festival atmosphere, One Spark Berlin is a contained location event at the PLATOON KUNSTHALLE.

== One Spark 2015 ==
One Spark's third event was held April 7–12, 2015 in downtown Jacksonville. It holds the record for highest attendance for a One Spark event at over 320,000. One Spark claims it was the world's largest crowdfunding event.

== One Spark 2016 ==
Organizers retooled One Spark for 2016, held April 6–7. For financial reasons, the event was shortened to two days; prizes were reduced and the contributor list shrank. The street festival portion of the event was combined with Downtown Jacksonville's monthly Art Walk into a joint "Spark Walk" on Wednesday, April 6. Thursday, April 7 featured a One Spark Innovation Day convention, including speakers on creator development and venture capital topics, and a "Spark Tank" event, where judges ranked the creators. One Spark estimated an attendance of 70,000 for Spark Walk.

== One Spark 2017 ==
At a press conference at EverBank Field on June 19, 2017, Jacksonville Mayor Lenny Curry and One Spark organizers announced that the 2017 festival would be held at U.S. Assure Club West at EverBank Field on October 6–7, with a concert held at Daily's Place on October 5. Bold Events will host up to 150 creators in five Spark Zones. Tickets will cost $5 to pre-register, and $10 on the day of the festival. However, due to the arrival of Hurricane Irma and the subsequent clean-up and restoration efforts, this has since been postponed, making 2017 the first year since its debut in which a One Spark festival was not hosted. The next One Spark festival was scheduled for April 6–7, 2018.

== One Spark 2018 ==
One Spark announces return of entrepreneurial festival.

== Event structure ==
One Spark is a multi-day event where creators, artists, entrepreneurs, and innovators can display projects in a multi-venue gallery in downtown Jacksonville. One Spark objective is to connect people with great ideas to the resources they need to make them a reality. It's a community behind great ideas.

One Spark is open to everyone. Creator projects can be at any stage of development. The event is built on the premise that great creations can come from garages, small studios, and dorm rooms and that the only thing that separates them from the big dogs is access to capital and resources. The selection process for One Spark is completely independent. In 2013, 2014, and 2015 Jacksonville events, venues select which Creators showcase in their spaces and attendees decide who gets funded. Showcasing at One Spark gives you access to thousands of dollars in crowdfunds and awards, millions in potential capital investments, and direct individual contributions from all the visitors. Beginning for One Spark 2015, a jury committee made up of subject matter experts and industry thought-leaders, sponsors and investors will select Creators for participation in each District.

The festival serves as a platform to present concepts to a large audience for validation and feedback. Attendees can view recent innovations and influence project development by voting for their preferred entries.

=== Prizes ===
In addition to the direct contributions by attendees to creators, from 2013 to 2015, One Spark provided additional prize money to creators, including a centralized crowdfund, juried prizes, and direct investment opportunities.

Event	Crowdfund	Jury Prizes	Potential Direct Investment Opportunities
Jacksonville 2013	$150,000	n/a	$1,000,000
Jacksonville 2014	$200,000	$100,000	$3,250,000
Jacksonville 2015	$300,000	$95,000	$3,500,000
Jacksonville 2016	n/a	n/a	Not yet released

Creators have been able raise money in four different ways:

1. Wowing attendees and collecting votes to score a piece of the crowdfund. Whatever percentage of the vote a project receives, that's how much of the crowdfund they earn.
2. Attendees can contribute directly to projects in any dollar amount.
3. Industry experts will jury an additional prize money to innovative projects in each category. The top vote getters in each category will also get the opportunity to get additional bonus prizes.
4. Millions in potential capital investments from investors attending the festival looking for new opportunities.

=== Creator projects ===
The essence of the event are the Creator projects. People can visit Creators as they demonstrate their ideas in Venues located throughout downtown Jacksonville. People can contribute to the ones they want to see funded.

Creators are people with ideas in art, innovation, music, science, and technology that turn them into Projects to showcase at the festival. A Project is a specific plan, design or undertaking with a clear end. A Project can be at any stage of development but will eventually be completed, and something will be produced as a result.

=== Pitch Decks ===
Pitch Decks are platform for Creators to reach a large audience and communicate their ideas in a short period of time. Creators are scheduled to take on the stage and pitch their Projects to a larger audience. This helps promote their idea and increase their chance of getting funded.

=== Entertainment, food and beer ===
The event features first-rate entertainment all day and well into the night. Attendees can also visit Food Villages featuring exclusive tastes from some of the city's best chefs and favourite food trucks. There is also a Beer Village where visitors can get locally crafted beer.

=== One Spark After Dark ===
Creators and attendees have the opportunity to network and enjoy in local pubs, bars, and special VIP Lounges. Parties and live entertainment are all around.

=== For Kids ===
This event is designed for everyone. Families can bring their kids and let them experience innovation first-hand and enjoy plenty of kid-centric programming. There are different activities programmed every day to create a more engaging experience for the little ones of the family. Activities will be published during the month of March.

== Past Event Details ==
=== Speakers Series 2014 ===
Speakers at One Spark 2014 are pioneers, disruptors and visionaries with big ideas to share. 2014 Speaker Series Features World's Top Minds in Design, Entrepreneurship and Innovation.

Some of the keynote speakers for this year's series are Scott Stratten, world-renowned social marketing expert and president of Un-Marketing from Toronto, Canada, and James White, accomplished artist and designer and founder of Signalnoise Studio from Dartmouth, Nova Scotia, Canada. In 2014 the series takes place on Thursday, April 10 and Friday, April 11 during One Spark with a different track each day. Speaker Doc Waller, inspiration architect at Becoming Possible from Atlanta, Georgia, will emcee the two-day event and will be joined by the musical stylings of Dr.Scott Padgett, music writer and producer from Columbia, South Carolina.

=== Speakers Series 2016 ===
The second day of One Spark 2016 featured speakers that focused on creator development and venture capital; it was held in the Hyatt Regency on April 7.

=== Attendance history ===
Year	Date	Attendance
2013	April 17–21, 2013	130,000
2014	April 9–13, 2014	260,000
2015	April 7–12, 2015	320,000
2016	April 6–7, 2016	70,000
