= Richard C. Edgley =

American Mormon leader (1936–2026)

Emeritus General Authority
- March 31, 2012 – March 27, 2026

First Counselor in the Presiding Bishopric
- December 27, 1995 – March 31, 2012
- End reason: Granted general authority emeritus status

Second Counselor in the Presiding Bishopric
- October 3, 1992 – December 27, 1995
- End reason: Reorganization when Merrill J. Bateman released to become BYU president

Personal details
- Born: Richard Crockett Edgley; February 6, 1936; Preston, Idaho, U.S.
- Died: March 27, 2026 (aged 90); Centerville, Utah, U.S.

Richard Crockett Edgley (February 6, 1936 – March 27, 2026) was an American general authority of the Church of Jesus Christ of Latter-day Saints (LDS Church) from October 1992 until his death. He was the first counselor in the church's presiding bishopric from 1995 to 2012 and was the second counselor from 1992 to 1995. He was designated as an emeritus general authority in March 2012.

Born in Preston, Idaho he obtained a bachelor's degree in political science from Brigham Young University and a Master of Business Administration from Indiana University School of Business. Edgley was a vice president of General Mills and became affectionately known as the "company Mormon" while working there as an executive.

== LDS Church service ==
As a young man, Edgley served as a missionary in the eastern United States and later served in the church as a stake president and bishop. Prior to his call as a general authority, he was the managing director of the church's Finance and Records Department. Edgley was called as second counselor to Presiding Bishop Robert D. Hales in 1992. In 1994, Merrill J. Bateman replaced Hales and Edgley was retained as second counselor. When former first counselor, H. David Burton, became presiding bishop in 1995, Edgley was called as first counselor. Edgley also participated in unveiling the first solar powered meetinghouse of the LDS Church in North America and a prototype eco-friendly meeting house.

== Personal life and death ==
Edgley was married to Pauline Nielson and they had six children. He died on March 27, 2026, at the age of 90.

The Church of Jesus Christ of Latter-day Saints titles
Preceded by H. David Burton	First Counselor in the Presiding Bishopric; December 27, 1995 – March 31, 2012	Succeeded by Gérald Caussé
Preceded by Glenn L. Pace	Second Counselor in the Presiding Bishopric; October 3, 1992 – December 27, 1995	Succeeded by Keith B. McMullin
