= Beneficial Financial Group =

American insurance company

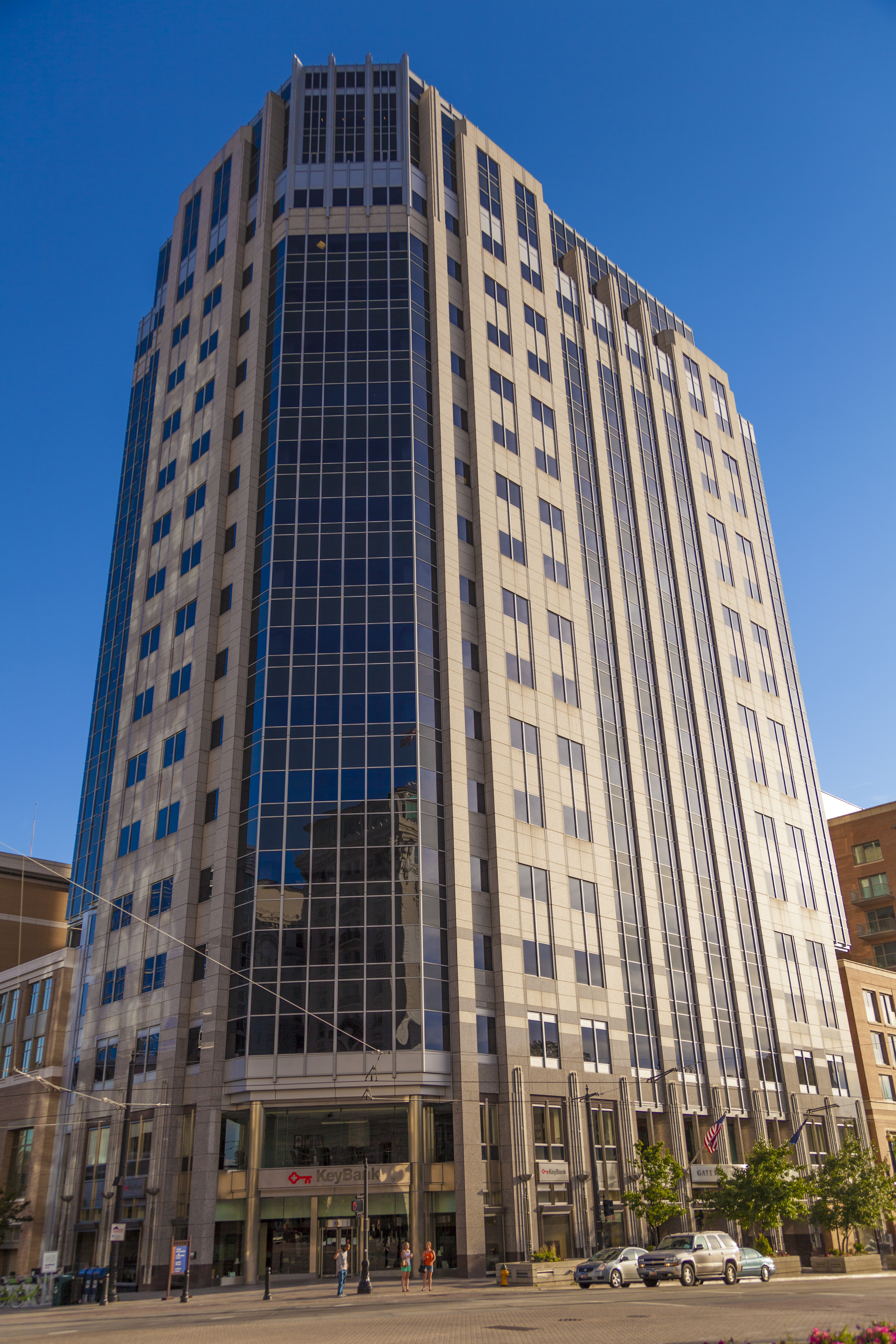
- Beneficial Financial Group Tower, also known as the Gateway Tower West, at City Creek Center in Salt Lake City
- Type: Subsidiary
- Industry: Insurance & Finance
- Founded: 1905; 121 years ago
- Headquarters: Salt Lake City, Utah, United States
- Key people: Kent Cannon, CEO
- Products: Whole and Universal Life, Annuities, and Disability Insurance
- Revenue: ▲$600 million USD (2005)
- Operating income: ▲$42.5 million USD (2005)
- Parent: Deseret Management Corporation
- Website: www.beneficialfinancialgroup.com

Beneficial Financial Group is an insurance and financial services company based in Salt Lake City, Utah. It is a subsidiary of Deseret Management Corporation (DMC), the for-profit arm of the Church of Jesus Christ of Latter-day Saints (LDS Church). The company was founded in 1905 and as of its 2013 fiscal year end had assets of $3.0 billion. The insurance side of the company was known for many years as the Beneficial Life Insurance Company.

Beneficial is certified by the Insurance Marketplace Standards Association for ethical business practices. Beneficial held an "A+" (stable) rating from Standard & Poor's for financial strength as of 2006. However, S&P downgraded the rating to "A" due to exposure to Mortgage-backed security investments in the wake of the 2008 housing bubble, and warned of further possible devaluations unless DMC replenished some of Beneficial's capital as it deteriorates "from its currently strong level."

On June 16, 2009, it was announced that Beneficial would stop writing new insurance policies at the end of August of that year. Deseret Management Corporation (DMC) reiterated its commitment to back existing policies, while noting that Beneficial lacked the scale to compete with larger insurers.

In 2019, David Nielsen, a former employee of the LDS Church's investment manager, Ensign Peak Advisors (EP), filed a whistleblower complaint with the Internal Revenue Service. Nielsen asserted that a portion of Beneficial's funding during a financial downturn had been provided by EP, a possible violation of federal tax rules. A statement from the church denied any wrongdoing, and claimed Nielsen's allegations were based on "limited information."

In 2024 fiscal year, the company reported admitted assets of US$1.754 billion, policy reserves and other liabilities of US$1.537 billion, and a capital and surplus of US$216.8 million. Its risk-based capital ratio as of December 31, 2024, was approximately 874%.

== Location ==
The company headquarters for many years was in the Beneficial Life Tower, directly above the ZCMI Center Mall. This office tower had the company name in large letters along the side, lit in blue at the top of the structure. The words Beneficial Life could be seen from quite a distance as the tower had an entirely unimpeded view of the Salt Lake Valley along the main artery known as State Street.

During the mid-1980s the Beneficial Life tower achieved notoriety when a rare breeding pair of peregrine falcons decided to take residence on the company letters on the north side of the building.

Around 2006, Beneficial moved to the former Kennecott building on an opposite corner of the same block. Both buildings remained while almost the entirety of the block was torn down, along with neighboring blocks of downtown Salt Lake City, and turned into a new development called the City Creek Center.
