= Ascension Sacred Heart Hospital Emerald Coast =

- Ascension

Geography
- Location: 7800 U.S. 98 Miramar Beach, FL 32550, Florida
- Coordinates: 30°22′43.3164″N 86°18′25.668″W

Organisation
- Religious affiliation: Catholic

Services
- Beds: 76

Helipads
- Helipad: Yes

History
- Opened: January 2003

Ascension Sacred Heart Hospital Emerald Coast is a 76-bed hospital located in Miramar Beach, Florida, part of Walton County. It opened in January 2003.

It is part of the Ascension hospital system.

== History ==
The hospital began construction in 2001 on land donated by the St. Joe Company, and opened in January 2003 with 50 beds. In 2014, the hospital announced a $30 million expansion to increase its inpatient, maternity, pediatric, and emergency capacity.

In 2024, a patient died at Ascension Sacred Heart in a case of malpractice that received widespread media attention. Surgeon Thomas J. Shaknovsky is alleged to have strongly encouraged Bill Bryan (then on vacation in Florida) that he needed a splenectomy immediately, where Shaknovsky could perform the procedure, rather than returning to a better-equipped hospital near where Bryan lived. Shaknovsky proceeded with the operation despite concerns from the staff he was not skilled in it and that the hospital's facilities were not sufficient, and then completely botched the operation – abandoning a laparoscopic approach for an open-air one, and then removing the wrong organ, the liver, which looks nothing like a spleen and weighs ten times as much as a spleen. The incident was sufficiently severe in its negligence that Shaknovsky was criminally charged with manslaughter in April 2026. Both Shaknovsky and Ascension Sacred Heart itself were named in a lawsuit by the deceased's wife, Beverly Bryan. She alleges that Joseph Bacani, the chief medical officer, had been warned by staff of Shaknovsky's documented previous mistakes (including operating on a wrong organ in a separate incident) and lack of skill; that the hospital deceptively got her signature on a form waiving the right to an autopsy; and that Bacani and the CEO then attempted to cover up the mistake by doctoring the death certificate and other official records to indicate that the spleen really was removed rather than the liver.
