= Farmland Reserve Inc. =

Mormon agriculture and food organization

Farmland Reserve Inc. is a nonprofit organization owned by The Church of Jesus Christ of Latter-day Saints that serves as both an agricultural investment arm and a resource for the church's food program.

Among its holdings are 370,000 acres (150,000 ha) in Nebraska, and 51,600 acres (20,900 ha) in Osage County, Oklahoma; A similar organization, Deseret Ranches of Florida owns 300,000 acres (120,000 ha) in Florida.
