= Ensign Peak Advisors =

LDS Church investment manager

Ensign Peak Advisors, Inc.
- Type: Private
- Industry: Grantmaking and Giving Services
- Founded: September 29, 1997
- Headquarters: Salt Lake City, Utah, U.S.
- Key people: Roger Clarke (CEO); W. Christopher Waddell (Presiding Bishop)
- Services: Investment management
- AUM: US$124 billion
- Owner: The Church of Jesus Christ of Latter-day Saints

Ensign Peak Advisors (/ˈɛnsaɪn/ EN-syne) (EP) is the investment manager for assets of the Church of Jesus Christ of Latter-day Saints (LDS Church).

In 1997, the investment division of the LDS Church was spun off into a separate legal entity named after Ensign Peak, a hill that overlooks Salt Lake City. As of February 2020, Roger Clarke is EP's Chief Executive Officer. W. Christopher Waddell is the church's Presiding Bishop who oversees church finances, including EP.

== History ==
After years of financial challenges, LDS Church leader N. Eldon Tanner established a practice in the 1960s of setting aside money from contributions each year for a rainy-day fund. EP was incorporated as a non-profit corporation on 29 September 1997. EP's holdings purportedly represent, in part, this rainy-day fund. The investment division started with three employees and by the late 1970s reportedly managed $1 billion. As of February 2020, EP employs about 70 people, and all employees must maintain good standing in the LDS Church.

In a 2019 press release, the LDS Church explained the use of donations by members, "The vast majority of these funds are used immediately to meet the needs of the growing Church including more meetinghouses, temples, education, humanitarian work and missionary efforts throughout the world. Over many years, a portion is methodically safeguarded through wise financial management and the building of a prudent reserve for the future."

== Investments and revenue ==
As of 2019, EP's holdings purportedly totaled more than $100 billion, including $40 billion-worth of U.S. stock, timberland in the Florida panhandle, and investments in prominent hedge funds such as Bridgewater Associates. Individual shares of stock identified as part of the investment fund reportedly include Apple, Chevron, Visa, JPMorgan Chase, Home Depot, Amazon, and Google. Part of the investments were with Fisher Investments, but some money was pulled after controversial comments from founder Kenneth Fisher. Clarke reports that in recent years the fund has gained about 7% annually.

On November 16, 2020, EP filed a Form 990-T with the Internal Revenue Service for 2019 stating that it is a 501(c)(3) organization, that it had recognized $84,415,984 of unrelated business income in 2019, and that it had $17,242,385 of unrelated business income tax on that income.

== Whistleblower complaint ==
In 2019, Religion Unplugged and The Washington Post reported a whistleblower complaint had been filed with the Internal Revenue Service (IRS) by a former EP employee, David A. Nielsen, that brought national attention to the reported size of the investments. Because EP was registered as a "supporting organization" of the Church, it was not legally obligated to disclose its finances to the public. The complaint reported that the firm had received around $1 billion of revenue from tithes donated to the Church every year, and that the Church misled members about their uses of the money. Nielsen was a senior portfolio manager and filed the complaint with his twin brother, Lars.

Later reports indicated that it was Lars who approached the media with the information and had uploaded the 74-page whistleblower document to Scribd, and that David had been against releasing the information publicly. Religion Unplugged had chosen to not name David in their original article, but The Post had done so. David released a statement which read "No one has been authorized to speak for me, including my brother, Lars Nielsen. Any public disclosure of information that has been in my possession was unauthorized by me. Repeated attempts to dissuade my brother, Lars Nielsen, from making public disclosures have been ignored. I will have no further comment on this matter."

Legal experts, including Peter J. Reilly of Forbes and Sam Brunson, author of God and the IRS: Accommodating Religious Practice in United States Tax Law, doubted that the IRS would take any action.

== SEC Investigation and penalty ==
On February 21, 2023, the U.S. Securities and Exchange Commission (SEC) publicly charged EP and the LDS Church "for failing to file forms that would have disclosed the Church's equity investments, and for instead filing forms for shell companies that obscured the Church's portfolio and misstated Ensign Peak’s control over the Church’s investment decisions." EP and the LDS Church had failed to file a combined Form 13F from 1997 to 2019, instead using shell LLCs across the United States to file them.

The SEC's cease-and-desist order stated that "The Church was concerned that disclosure of the assets in the name of Ensign Peak, a known Church affiliate, would lead to negative consequences in light of the size of the Church's portfolio. Ensign Peak did not have the authority to implement this approach without the approval of the Church's First Presidency." The SEC found that Ensign Peak and the church's portfolio had increased in value from $7 billion to approximately $37.8 billion. In the public statement, Gurbir S. Grewal, director of the SEC's Division of Enforcement, said, "We allege that the LDS Church's investment manager, with the Church's knowledge, went to great lengths to avoid disclosing the Church's investments, depriving the Commission and the investing public of accurate market information. The requirement to file timely and accurate information on Forms 13F applies to all institutional investment managers, including non-profit and charitable organizations.”

Alleged "great lengths" included creating "the impression that the Clone LLCs conducted business operations throughout the U.S., making it more difficult to trace the Clone LLCs back to Ensign Peak or the Church." Further, that Ensign Peak Advisors and church employees were selected to sign as managers of each Clone LLC, despite having "very limited information about the Clone LLCs or why they were created." These managers were selected for their "common names and a limited presence on social media" and signed documents affirming they "had sole investment discretion for the securities listed, that there were no other managers for these securities", when in reality "Ensign Peak continued to manage the entire portfolio".

As a result of these charges, the SEC penalized Ensign Peak $4 million and the LDS Church $1 million.

The church stated it had worked with the SEC for years to reach settlement, and that the church's "senior leadership received and relied upon legal counsel when it approved of the use of the external companies to make the filings." The church further stated, "We reached resolution with the SEC. We affirm our commitment to comply with the law, regret mistakes made, and now consider this matter closed."

== Lawsuits ==
In 2019, James Huntsman, the brother of former Utah Gov. Jon Huntsman Jr., filed a lawsuit seeking the return of $5 million he donated before he left the church. The church has sought to dismiss the lawsuit filed by Huntsman; a U.S. District Court dismissed Huntsman's lawsuit in September 2021. Huntsman appealed the ruling and two years later in August 2023, that ruling was overturned and the lawsuit was reinstated by a 9th Circuit Court of Appeals panel of three judges. The church was granted an en banc appeal of the reinstatement, with the court hearing oral arguments in September 2024. In a unanimous decision, the appeals court dismissed the lawsuit on 31 January 2025, finding no evidence of fraudulent misrepresentation by the LDS Church.

In October 2023, another lawsuit was filed in the United States District Court of Utah by three church members who claim to have donated a total of $350,000. A third lawsuit was filed in California in early 2024, seeking class action status. By August 2024, several of the suits in five states had been combined and granted class-action status. The plaintiffs sought: a return of tithing paid; judgment to declare the church's financial practices illegal; a halt on the tithing practice altogether "while accountants sort through the faith’s finances or the court appoints a special monitor"; and the creation of a national class of plaintiffs with similar interests. In response, the church said the case would threaten its religious freedoms, and that the plaintiffs could not represent the "millions of faithful tithe-paying members" who would be uninterested in joining the suit. The combined suit was dismissed with prejudice in April 2025 by a federal judge, who ruled that the plaintiffs had exceeded the statute of limitations and had failed to meet the legal standard for fraud.

== See also ==
- Finances of The Church of Jesus Christ of Latter-day Saints
- List of wealthiest religious organizations
