= Deseret Ranches =

LDS Church ranching operations in Central Florida

Coordinates: 28.186097°N 80.878533°W

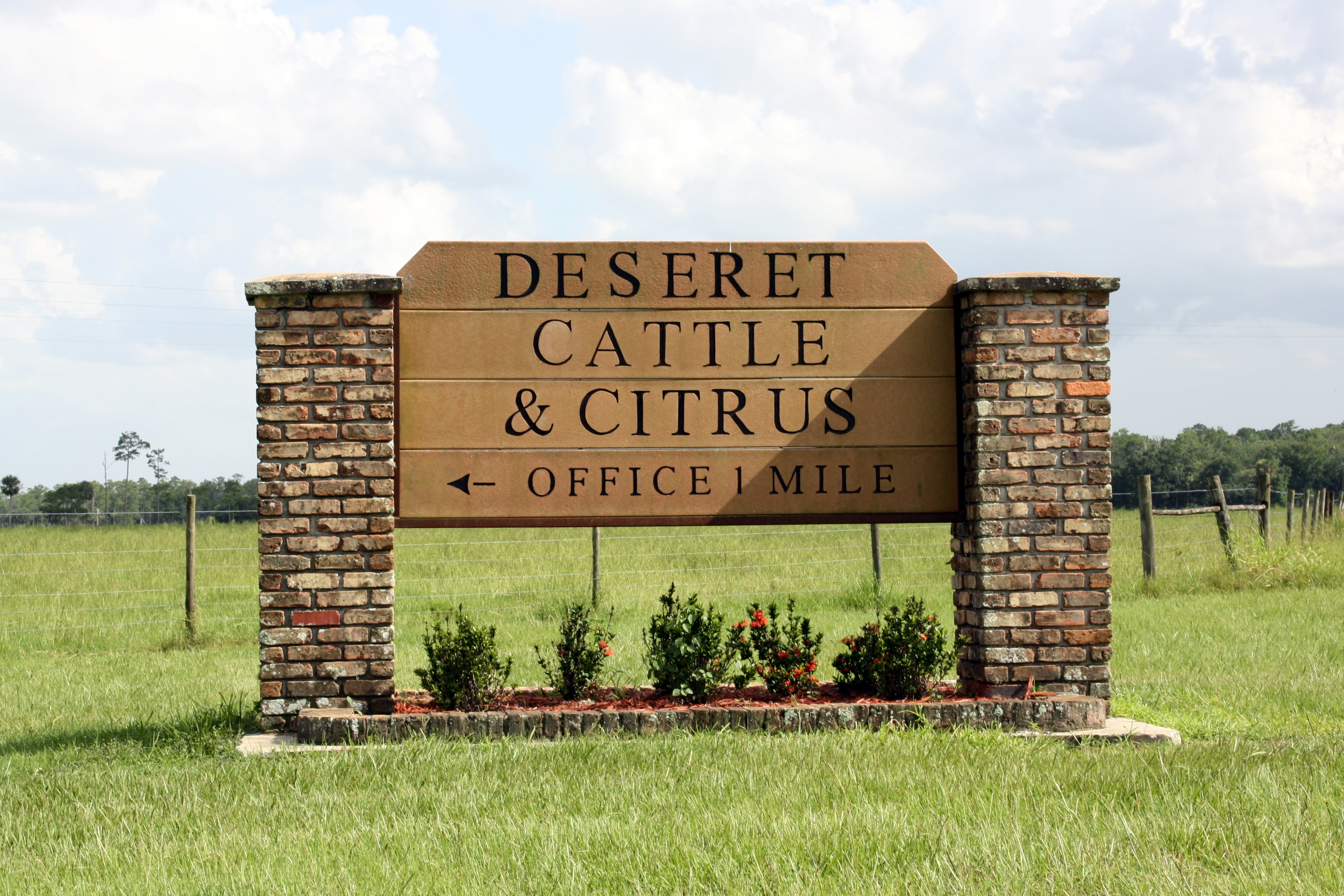
Sign at the entrance to the Deseret Cattle and Citrus Ranch in Florida

Deseret Ranches (/ˌdɛzəˈrɛt/) is the ranching operations of the Church of Jesus Christ of Latter-day Saints (LDS Church) in Central Florida. The Ranches include several organizations: Deseret Ranches of Florida, Deseret Cattle and Citrus, Taylor Creek Management, East Central Florida Services, AgReserves, and Farmland Reserve. The ranches are located 50 miles (80 km) southeast of the Orlando International Airport and 19 miles (31 km) west of Cape Canaveral, Florida. As of 2026, Deseret Ranches is the most productive cow-calf ranch in the United States.

== Geography ==
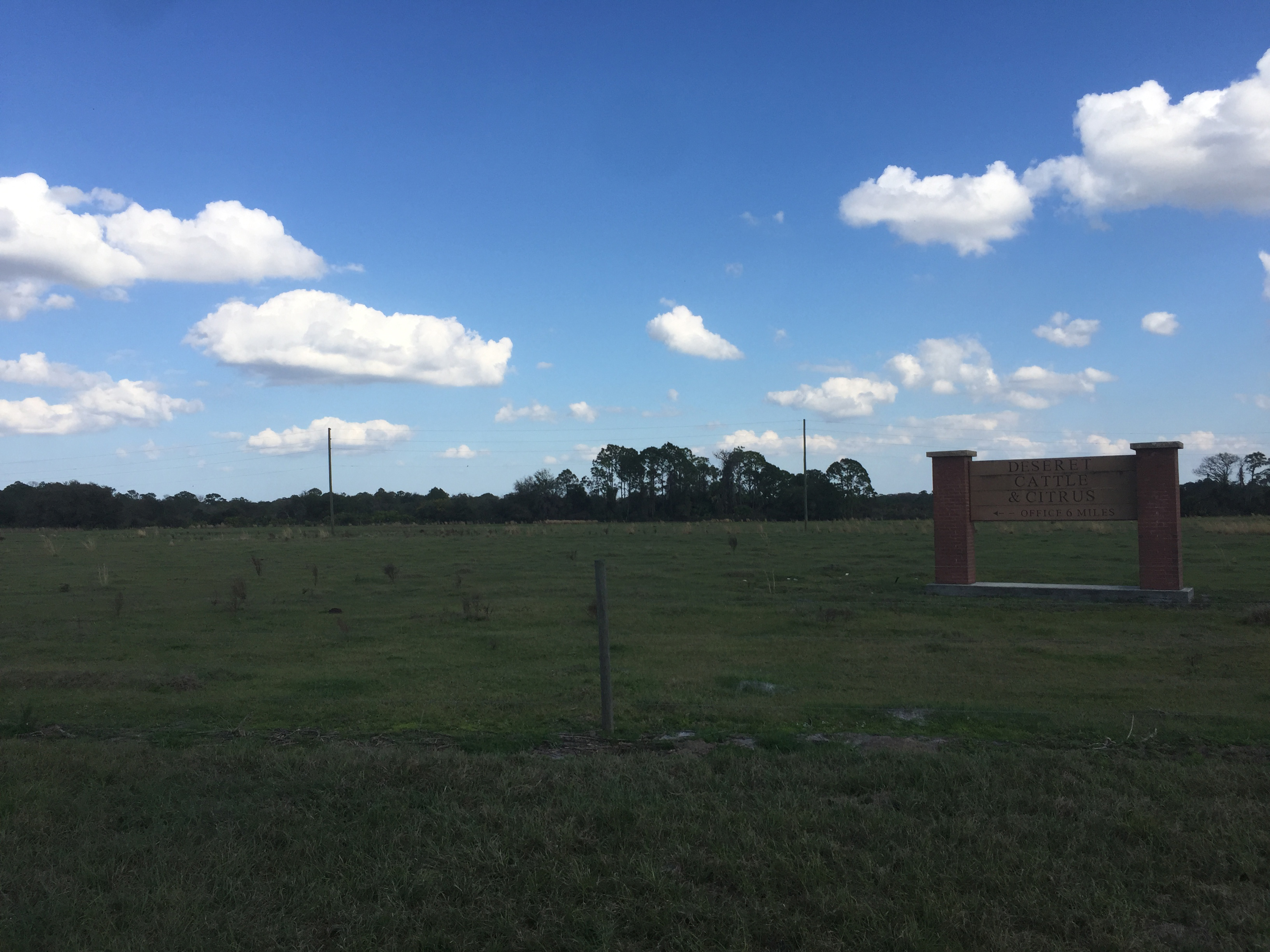
Deseret Ranches in St. Cloud, Florida

The ranch, owned by the LDS Church, spreads over the three central Florida counties of Osceola, Orange, and Brevard. Covering almost 300,000 acres (1,200 km^{2}) of land, 90 ranchers and their families live on the property. The ranch maintains 44,000 head of beef cattle. It is a for-profit operation and is not a normal part of the LDS Church's humanitarian efforts. Gordon B. Hinckley, former church president, said, "We have felt that good farms, over a long period, represent a safe investment where the assets of the Church may be preserved and enhanced, while at the same time, they are available as an agricultural resource to feed people should there come a time of need."

== History ==
The earliest plans for this ranch were made in 1949, and in 1950 the original 45,000 acres (180 km^{2}) were purchased. Deseret Ranch now covers an area 50 by 30 miles (80 by 48 km), with a separate section surrounding Kenansville in Osceola County.

The church bought the original 54,000-acre (220 km^{2}) tract in 1950 and over 50 years, the ranch grew to more than 312,000 acres (1,260 km^{2}). In 1997, it was the world's largest beef ranch, and the land was worth an estimated $858 million.

== Operations ==
Like its other financial details, the LDS Church does not disclose the revenue or valuation of the ranch. Still, it is known that in 2000, 16 million pounds (7300 t) of calves were moved, which then translated to about $16 million in revenue. In 2008, Deseret Ranch discussed selling part of the property for a development near Orlando, Florida, but the proposed rezoning was withdrawn before approval.

The Deseret Ranch also brings in revenue from the mining of native shell beds (used throughout Florida to pave roads), orange groves, hunting permits, and sales of ornamental palm trees.

In 2011, having won control of some of its water from the St. Johns River Water Management District, it was planning on selling some to Cocoa, Florida.

== See also ==
- Henry D. Moyle
- Agriculture in Florida
