= St. Joe Company =

Land development firm

The St. Joe Company
- Type: Public
- Traded as: NYSE: JOE; S&P 600 component
- Industry: Real estate development
- Founded: 1936; 90 years ago
- Headquarters: Panama City Beach, Florida, U.S.
- Key people: Jorge Gonzalez- President and Chief Executive Officer; Marek Bakun- Executive Vice President and Chief Financial Officer; Lisa Walters- Senior Vice President - General Counsel; K. Rhea Goff- Senior Vice President and Chief Administrative Officer
- Products: Residential, Commercial & Rural Land; Forestry Products; Resort Operations
- Revenue: > US$ 513.2 million (January 1, 2025 - December 31, 2025
- Number of employees: 1,200 (2025)
- Website: joe.com

The St. Joe Company is a land development company headquartered in Panama City Beach, Florida. Founded in 1936 and until 1966 known as St. Joe Paper Company, the company still operates a forestry division but is primarily engaged in real estate development and asset management. The company's land holdings are concentrated in Northwest Florida with the vast majority located in Bay and Walton counties. Of the 110,500 acres The St. Joe Company owns that fall within the Bay-Walton Sector Plan, 53,000 acres were placed into conservation by the company. The company develops its land for a variety of uses including residential neighborhoods, hotels, apartment communities, leasable commercial space, office buildings and medical facilities among others.

== Company History & Overview ==
The St. Joe Company (then St. Joe Paper Company) was founded in 1936, and at one point was the second largest private landholder in the state of Florida, owning more than a million acres of property in the state. Over time, properties in other parts of the state were sold as the Company began to focus on strategic land holdings in Northwest Florida.

The St. Joe Company transitioned from a paper/industrial focus to land development, and in 2010 moved its corporate offices from Jacksonville, FL to the Walton County/Bay County area to be closer to the majority of their future development holdings.

In 2010, Northwest Florida Beaches International Airport (ECP) opened on 4,000 acres of land donated by The St. Joe Company. At the time, the old airport being replaced handled about 300,000 passengers per year. In 2022, approximately 1.5 million passengers flew through ECP.

In 2014 The St. Joe Company sold more than 380,000 acres – to AgReserves for $562 million, retaining strategic land holdings concentrated in Northwest Florida.

Eventually – in 2020 – the company HQ moved into the newly constructed corporate offices in the Beckrich Office Park on R. Jackson Blvd. in Panama City Beach.

Today, the majority of The St. Joe Company's land holdings are in the Bay/Walton County area, 110,500 acres of which are being developed under a 50-year plan, with 53,000 acres being placed into conservation.

The St. Joe Company’s current total land holdings in Northwest Florida (including areas outside of the Bay-Walton Sector Plan) is about 171,000 acres.

The 50-year Bay-Walton Sector Plan gives legal rights for The St. Joe Company to develop more than 170,000 residential dwelling units, more than 22 million square feet of retail, commercial and industrial space and more than 3,000 hotel rooms on lands it owns within Bay and Walton Counties.

== Development Activity ==
The St. Joe Company's primary activity is development of its land holdings in Northwest Florida. While doing so it also places tens of thousand of acres of land into permanent conservation. The Company divides its development projects into three main segments: residential, commercial and hospitality. In addition to its development activities, the Company operates many assets in its commercial and hospitality segments.

== Residential Real Estate ==
The St. Joe Company's residential development activities consist primarily of single family home neighborhoods, active adult communities and workforce housing.

Development of the waterfront community of WaterColor was completed in 2022. The WaterColor community features more than 1,000 residences, a 67-room hotel, shops and restaurants and numerous parks spread over 499 acres.

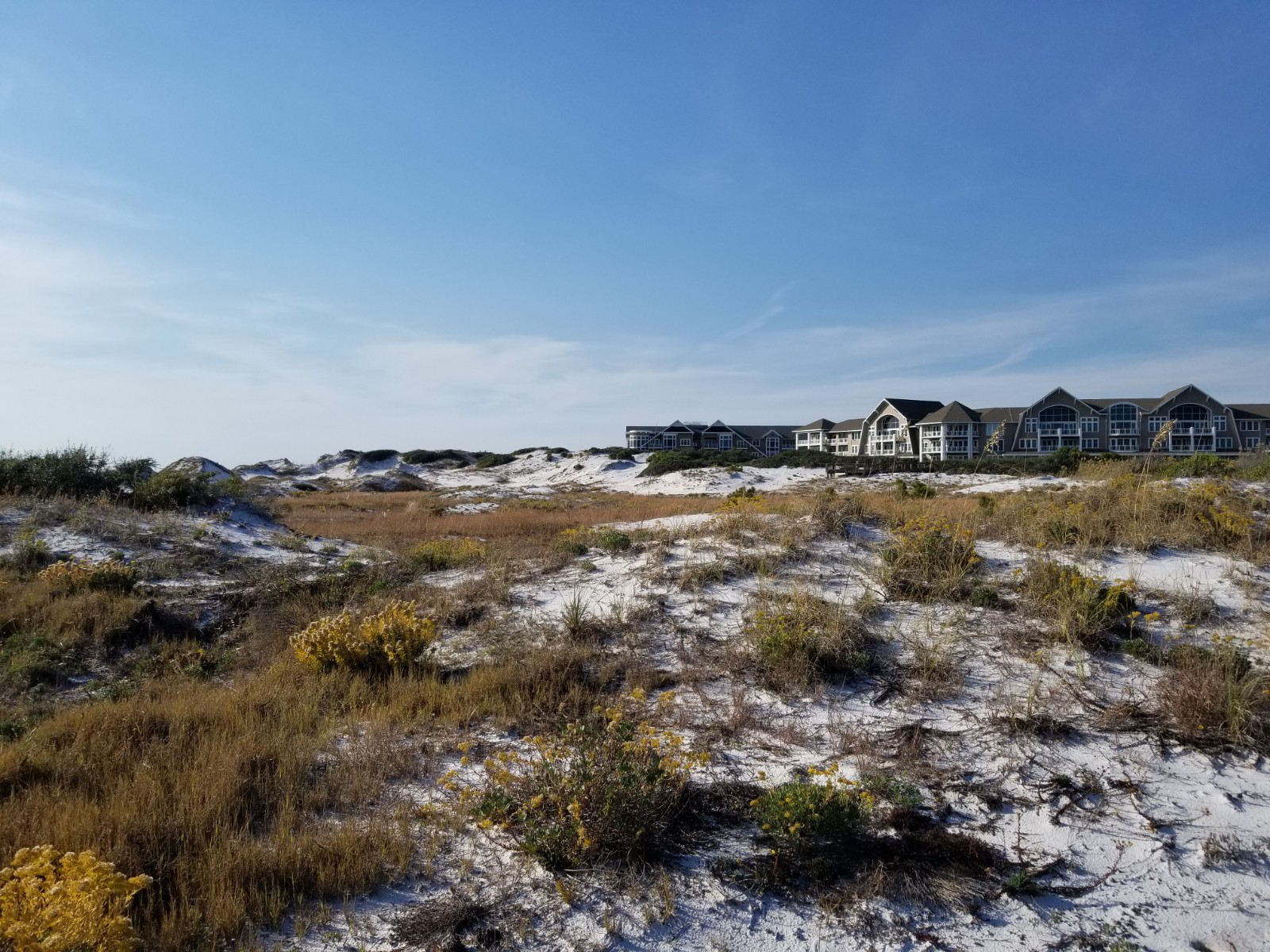
View of sand dunes in front of Watersound Beach Club

Following the WaterColor community, St. Joe developed the resort communities of Watersound Beach and neighboring Watersound West Beach. Residential communities that the company continues to develop with new phases include Watersound Origins in Walton County Florida, Breakfast Point in Panama City Beach, Ward Creek in Bay County Florida and WindMark Beach - a master-planned community near Port St. Joe, Florida, among others.

With joint venture partner Minto Communities USA, St. Joe broke ground on Latitude Margaritaville Watersound, a Jimmy Buffet-Buffett themed 55 and older community, in 2020. In 2022, the community celebrated its 1,000th home sale. The first phase of the Latitude Margaritaville Watersound community is planned for 3,500 homes with additional phases to follow.

In response to the housing shortage created by the destruction from Hurricane Michael in 2018, The St. Joe Company began the development of three new communities in eastern Bay County, Florida: College Station, Park Place and Titus Park. Since that time, each of these communities has seen development of additional phases making way for more homesites.

== Hospitality Operations ==
The St. Joe Company owns several hospitality assets in Northwest Florida. The popular beach vacation towns of Panama City Beach and South Walton County, Florida are home to several St. Joe hotels including WaterColor Inn, Watersound Inn, The Pearl Hotel, The Lodge 30A, Home2 Suites by Hilton, Camp Creek Inn, Hilton Garden Inn Panama City Airport, Homewood Suites Panama City Beach, Hotel Indigo Panama City Marina and Embassy Suites by Hilton Panama City Beach Resort. As of December 31, 2023, the company had an additional hotel that it plans to open in 2024. The company currently has 1,177 hotel rooms in its portfolio. Once the hotel under construction is complete, that total will increase to 1,298.

In February 2023, the Company opened The Lodge 30A, an 85-room boutique hotel in Seagrove Beach, Florida. In April 2023, The St. Joe Company opened Embassy Suites by Hilton Panama City Beach Resort featuring 255 guest suites, multiple restaurants, meeting and convention space and an outdoor 5th floor reception venue with views of the Gulf of Mexico. A 107-room Home2 Suites by Hilton in Santa Rosa Beach, Florida opened in May 2023. June 2023 saw the opening of Hotel Indigo Panama City Marina with a top floor sky bar and full-service restaurant taking advantage of the hotel's unobstructed views of St. Andrews Bay. The hotel's location in downtown Panama City, Florida is undergoing a rebuilding process after sustaining significant damage during Hurricane Michael in 2018. Camp Creek Inn opened in June 2023. This 75-room boutique inn sits on the grounds of Watersound Club, St. Joe's private membership club. Camp Creek Inn is located adjacent to Camp Creek Golf Course and a new Club amenity project that opened in April 2023 and includes pools, tennis and pickleball courts, a wellness center, dining venues, a playground, sports courts and other amenities available to club member and guests of Camp Creek Inn. In 2023, St. Joe hotels welcomed guests from all 50 states.

Additionally, Watersound Club members get access to golf at the club's two golf courses: Shark's Tooth Golf Course and Camp Creek Golf Course. Also available to members is a sprawling Beach Club featuring multiple pools, tennis courts and dining venues as well as more than 1,000 feet of private Gulf of Mexico beachfront. As of December 2023, Watersound Club had members from 40 states.

St. Joe's two marinas were destroyed during Hurricane Michael in 2018. In 2022, the company completed the rebuilding of the two marina and reopened them under the name Point South Marina - Port St. Joe and Point South Marina - Bay Point. Combined, the marinas feature 427 boat slips.

== Commercial Real Estate ==
The St. Joe Company owns and leases a diverse portfolio of commercial space - much of it located adjacent to the company's residential real estate developments and hospitality assets. The company's leasable commercial space includes shopping centers, light industrial space, warehouses and retail space totaling approximately 1 million square feet of space primarily located in Bay and Walton Counties.

The Company's VentureCrossings Enterprise Centre, an industrial park near Northwest Florida Beaches International Airport consists of more than 300,000 square feet of space. The Company has developed several commerce parks in Northwest Florida and has historically sold lots to third parties. In some cases, St. Joe builds light industrial and warehouse buildings in its commerce parks and leases the space.

Lifestyle shopping centers make up a significant portion of St. Joe's leasable space portfolio. Pier Park North in Panama City Beach has more than 320,00 square feet of leasable square feet that was 100% leased as of December 31, 2023. The company is actively developing two additional lifestyle centers. Watersound Town Center, located at the entrance to the Watersound Origins community featured approximately 89,000 square feet of leasable space with an additional 50,000 square feet under construction. Development work is underway at Watersound West Bay Center, a planned lifestyle center located at the entrance of the Latitude Margaritaville Watersound community. Watersound West Bay Center is planned for up to 500,000 square feet of leasable space at build out.

The Company's first apartment community was Pier Park Crossings, a 360-unit community within walking distance of Panama City Beach's Pier Park shopping and lifestyle center. Additional apartment communities have followed including Watersound Origins Crossings, Sea Sound Apartments and North Bay Landing. As of June 30, 2023, the Company had 1,024 multi-family units complete with an additional 359 under construction. St. Joe also owns a 107-unit assisted living community and has a 148-unit independent living community under construction that is scheduled to open in fall 2023.

In 2022, St. Joe, along with Tallahassee Memorial Health Care and the Florida State University College of Medicine broke ground on a medical campus in Panama City Beach, Florida. The first phase of the project includes an 80,000 square foot medical office building. Future plans include a 100-bed hospital and additional medical office space.

== Conservation ==
The St. Joe Company's development activities include a long-term, large-scale framework for conservation. The Company's Bay-Walton Sector Plan, an approved framework for land use designations, includes more than 50,000 acres of conservation within the 110,500 acre plan. Much of these conversation efforts focus on protecting the quality of local waterways. Under the Bay-Walton Sector Plan, St. Joe protected nearly the entire shoreline of West Bay as well as the creeks and tributaries that flow into it. Other efforts to protect regionally significant natural resources include responsible land management and timber management on its land holdings. The Company regularly conducts prescribed burns on land to reduce the threat of wildfires and promote a healthier forest. The Company has worked with agencies including the U.S. Fish and Wildlife Service to protect sensitive species including the red cockaded woodpecker, flatwoods salamander and gopher tortoise.

== Donated Land in Bay County and Walton County ==
The St. Joe Company donated land for two sports parks (Frank Brown Park and the Panama City Beach Sports Complex), and two schools (Arnold High School and the A. Gary Walsingham Academy) in Panama City Beach. Land previously owned by The St. Joe Company was sold to the city of Panama City Beach to create the 2,900-acre Panama City Beach Conservation Park. In Walton County the St. Joe Company donated the land at 7800 US Hwy 98 in Miramar Beach where Ascension Sacred Heart Hospital Emerald Coast was built, and helped create a STEAM School named “The Magnet Innovation Center” on land and with facilities previously used as the company’s corporate offices at 133 S. Watersound Parkway.

== Beginning ==
The company was founded by Edward Ball in 1936 as part of the Alfred I. du Pont Testamentary Trust. The staunchly segregationist Ball was du Pont's brother-in-law and also affiliated with the Florida Democrat political group known as "The Pork Chop Gang". Prior to the company's formal establishment, the trust had already begun land purchases in 1923. During the land booms in South Florida, the company acquired still-cheap land in the Florida Panhandle. In 1933, du Pont purchased the Apalachicola Northern Railroad.

The Apalachicola Northern Railroad had extended its network from Chattahoochee to Port St. Joe, Florida, in 1910, hoping to take advantage of increased shipping trade through the Panama Canal. However, when the Great Depression hit, business dropped off significantly. Du Pont purchased the struggling railroad, and made plans to use the infrastructure to build a paper mill, leading to the foundation of the St. Joe Company.

Du Pont drew up elaborate plans for the development of his mill town as "The Model City of the South", but died before it could be completed. His brother-in-law, Ed Ball, took control of the St. Joe Company in 1935, but never acted on the master city plan.

Construction began in 1936, and from 1938 to 1996, the company operated a paper mill at Port St. Joe, as St. Joe Paper Company. From 1938 to 1974 St. Joe Paper Company discharged mill wastewater into an unlined impoundment in the Highland View Neighborhood and St. Joe Bay. Land purchases continued throughout the 1940s and 1950s, often for "mere dollars an acre," and St. Joe eventually owned more than one million acres (4,000 km^{2}). The company invigorated the local economy following the Depression, employing thousands at its paper mill, but wreaked havoc on the environment. The mill released sulfurous exhaust from sulfate pulping and dioxins, an unintended toxin generated by the chlorine bleaching process used to make white pulp.

By the 1950s, the company was drawing 35 million gallons of water a day from the Floridan Aquifer, seriously depleting the water table. St Joe Paper also clear-cut millions of acres of old growth forest, engaging in silviculture to replant the areas with slash pine. The practice decimated the native longleaf pine stands, reducing the species to "2 percent of its former range." Because of this, the United States Department of the Interior designated parts of the region a Critically Endangered Ecosystem.

The paper mill was most profitable in the 1960s, with products being directly marketed to company-owned box plants. However, an extended period of down time (9-months) due to market conditions in 1996 signaled the beginning of the end for the mill. After nearly sixty years, St. Joe decided to get out of the paper business. The mill was sold in 1996 to Florida Coast Paper for $390 million, and that company was able to operate and produce paper until the decline of the container board market. Florida Coast Paper closed the mill on August 16, 1998, and did not reopen. The mill was gone by 2003.

After the dismantling of the paper mill, the St. Joe Company was back in town in 2008 to unveil a $344 million plan for the former mill site that was similar to Alfred du Pont's idealized Southern town – an integrated city with upscale residential districts, entertainment venues, a thriving port, and a diverse economy. The State of Florida re-routed US 98 inland to permit development of beachfront property that would become the Windmark Beach community.

== Talisman Sugar Corporation ==
St. Joe acquired the Talisman Sugar Company in 1972, which included almost 50,000 acres (200 km^{2}) in Palm Beach and Hendry counties in the Everglades. St. Joe received negative publicity for their south Florida sugar cane business from labor unions and environmental groups, including by Cesar Chavez of the United Farm Workers.

Additionally, pressures over environmental damage led the company to strike a deal with the federal government and state of Florida to sell its sugar business as part of an Everglades restoration project; Florida paid $133.5 million in 1999 to St. Joe Co. for the 50,960-acre (206.2 km^{2}) Talisman Sugar Plantation. As part of the deal, the company continued using the land for an additional five years, during which it contracted the land to Florida Crystals and other sugar growers. In order to utilize some portions of the Talisman property which were not contiguous, land swaps with other sugar growers were necessary.

Some of St. Joe's most profitable deals came from selling conservation land to the state. A total of some 90,000 acres (360 km^{2}) were purchased by the state for $182 million. That works out to an average of over $2,000 per acre.

== Post-Ball era ==
Following Ball's death in 1981, the company began to sell off its industrial operations and focus on land development. As a developer, St. Joe has distinguished itself as catering to more high-income clientele. Pete Rummell, formerly chairman of Walt Disney Imagineering, was hired in 1997 to lead their real estate business and became chairman and CEO. Also in 1997, St. Joe acquired Arvida Corporation.

St. Joe built a 140,000 sq ft (13,000 m^{2}) corporate headquarters on the St. Johns River in downtown Jacksonville in 2003. At the groundbreaking, Rummell said, "This is an important milestone for us. We don't get a lot of revenue from the city of Jacksonville, but it's important to who we are and what we are." The company headquarters remained in Jacksonville until 2010, when it moved its headquarters to Watersound, Florida.

The company operates through four segments:

- Residential Real Estate, develops large-scale, mixed-use resort, seasonal and primary residential communities, as well as sells housing units and home sites to retail customers and builders.
- Commercial Real Estate, develops and sells commercial properties, including retail properties, multifamily parcels, office parks and commerce parks.
- Rural Land Sales., markets parcels for various rural residential and recreational uses in northwest Florida. It sells parcels of undeveloped land and developed home sites within rural settings.
- Forestry, grows, harvests and sells timber and wood fiber. Its products primarily include pine pulpwood, timber and cypress products.

During the national downturn in the real estate market in the mid-2000s as part of the Great Recession, the company's sales suffered, with earnings dropping off by 60 percent in 2006. As a result, the company cut its workforce, exited the homebuilding market and sold its office holdings which included the corporate headquarters built in 2003.

In the late 1900s, St. Joe began to sell timber land in rural areas after deciding to focus on community and commercial development. Rummell departed in August, 2008 and was replaced by Hugh Durden as chairman of the board. Durden was also chairman of the Alfred I. duPont Testamentary Trust since 2005.

In December 2009, the company acknowledged selling two large developments at a loss, which they characterized as "non-strategic". The transactions were intended to take advantage of federal tax rules on losses from the sale of assets.

On March 18, 2010, the company announced plans to relocate their corporate headquarters to a site near the Northwest Florida Beaches International Airport when their lease expired in 2011. Most of the company's land is located in the panhandle and their success depends on development there.

At the end of February, 2011, St. Joe announced that Britt Greene had resigned as CEO and president of the company. The company's largest shareholder, Fairholme, disagreed with management's asset development plans and sought to replace certain board members. Greene and three other members resigned, and were replaced by two Fairholme employees and former Florida governor Charlie Crist.

In 2013 St. Joe Company sold 382,834 acres to AgReserves in Bay, Calhoun, Franklin, Gadsden, Gulf, Jefferson, Leon, Liberty and Wakulla counties.

== Bay County ==
The company began marketing the panhandle region as "Florida's Great Northwest," and was the major force behind plans to relocate and dramatically expand Panama City-Bay County International Airport in the hope that a larger airport would attract wealthier home buyers. In order to attract Southwest Airlines, St. Joe Company agreed to a $26 million guarantee to cover any of Southwest Airlines' losses for a full three years to get them to commit to service. Southwest later became so successful that they asked St. Joe to release the guarantee so they could remove restrictions on flight routes into the airport. St. Joe never had to pay on this guarantee. The idea of the airport received hostility from some local taxpayers (56% opposed it in a non-binding referendum) that funded the project and environmental groups that sued St. Joe six times. Residents pointed to the fact that St. Joe already had a 50-year, 100,000-acre development plan based on the airport and quotes such as "Silicon Valley was in the middle of nowhere ...We think we can do the same thing." from Britt Greene, the company's president, as evidence that the company was out for itself in the building of the $300+ million airport. St. Joe owns about 78,000 acres (320 km^{2}) of land in the area surrounding the new airport site, and has announced plans to build 5,800 homes and 4,300,000 square feet (400,000 m^{2}) of commercial space.

The company had also offered to donate about 40,000 acres (160 km^{2}) for preservation. The project attracted quite a bit of opposition, including taxpayer and environmental groups who pointed out that the current airport was operating at only half its capacity—with 12 outbound flights a day— and argues that the new facility would primarily benefit one developer, at taxpayer expense. The new airport was approved and construction began in 2009 on 4,000 acres (16 km^{2}) donated by St. Joe. During construction even light rainfalls created mudslides that washed sediment into the surrounding wetlands with a decline in water quality as a result. By May 2009 the project had already accumulated almost $400,000 in fines for 72 water quality violations and filling in wetlands without a permit. Separately, Phoenix Construction Services, which built the airport, had already been fined in the past for filling in wetlands or allowing unfiltered runoff to flow into waterways, in violation of environmental permits; the fines brought their total to almost $2 million in environmental fines. The Northwest Florida Beaches International Airport opened on May 23, 2010, northwest of Panama City.

Since completion, the new airport has seen much heavier use than the old one. For example, in the year ending June 26, 2012, the airport had 47,604 aircraft operations, average 130 per day: 47% general aviation, 23% military, 16% airline, and 15% air taxi. 110 aircraft were then based at this airport: 78% single-engine, 14% multi-engine, and 8% jet.

In 2021 ECP set a new record for passenger numbers, reporting 1,598,492 total passengers for the year. In its last full year of operation, the old Panama City airport (PFN) saw just 313,000 passengers.
