= Keith B. McMullin =

American Latter-Day Saint operating executive (1941–2026)

Emeritus general authority
- March 31, 2012

Second Counselor in the Presiding Bishopric
- December 27, 1995 – March 31, 2012
- Predecessor: Richard C. Edgley
- Successor: Dean M. Davies
- End reason: Granted general authority emeritus status

Personal details
- Born: Keith Brigham McMullin; August 18, 1941; St. George, Utah, U.S.
- Died: September 30, 2026 (aged 85)

Keith Brigham McMullin (August 18, 1941 – September 30, 2026) was an American Latter-Day Saint operations executive who was the CEO of Deseret Management Corporation from April 2012 until late 2023.

McMullin had been a general authority of the Church of Jesus Christ of Latter-day Saints (LDS Church) since 1995. He was the second counselor in the LDS Church's presiding bishopric from 1995 to 2012, at which time he was designated an emeritus general authority.

He was born in St. George, Utah, and was a banking and finance graduate of the University of Utah. He worked for the Ford Motor Company as an investment and financial analyst and also managed several small businesses. In 2016, McMullin was elected chairman of the board of governors for the Salt Lake Chamber.

== LDS Church service ==
Prior to his call as a general authority, McMullin served as a mission president in Germany, where he had also served as an LDS Church missionary as a young man. McMullin also served in the church as a bishop and stake president. Prior to his call to the Presiding Bishopric, he served as managing director of the church's Welfare Services Department for ten years.

== Personal life and death ==
McMullin married Carolyn Jean Gibbs and they became the parents of eight children. He died on September 30, 2026, at the age of 85.

== See also ==
- Council on the Disposition of the Tithes
- Richard C. Edgley

The Church of Jesus Christ of Latter-day Saints titles
Preceded by Richard C. Edgley	Second Counselor in the Presiding Bishopric; December 27, 1995 – March 31, 2012	Succeeded by Dean M. Davies
