= Henry D. Moyle =

American religious leader

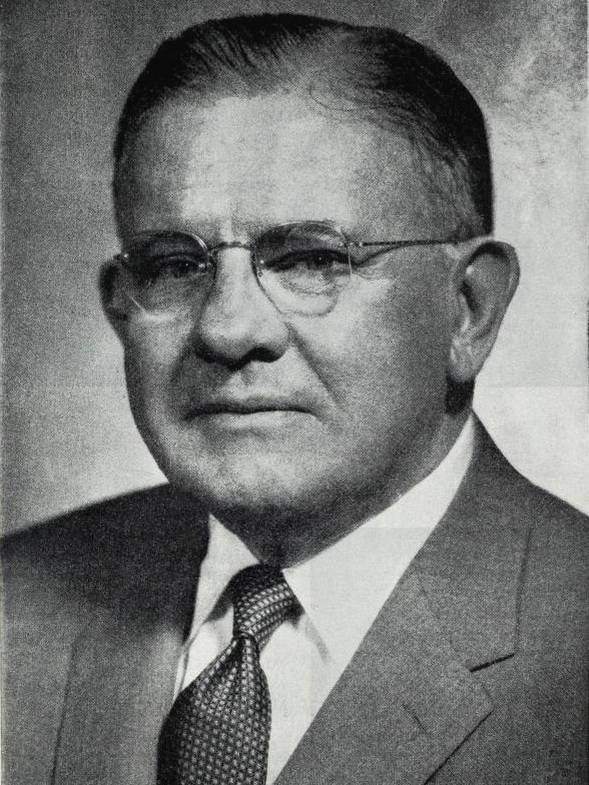

First Counselor in the First Presidency
- October 12, 1961 – September 18, 1963
- Called by: David O. McKay
- Predecessor: J. Reuben Clark
- Successor: Hugh B. Brown

Second Counselor in the First Presidency
- June 12, 1959 – October 12, 1961
- Called by: David O. McKay
- Predecessor: J. Reuben Clark
- Successor: Hugh B. Brown
- End reason: Called as First Counselor in the First Presidency

Quorum of the Twelve Apostles
- April 10, 1947 – June 12, 1959
- Called by: George Albert Smith
- End reason: Called as Second Counselor in the First Presidency

LDS Church Apostle
- April 10, 1947 – September 18, 1963
- Reason: Death of Charles A. Callis
- Reorganization at end of term: Thomas S. Monson ordained and N. Eldon Tanner added to First Presidency

Personal details
- Born: Henry Dinwoodey Moyle; April 22, 1889; Salt Lake City, Utah Territory
- Died: September 18, 1963 (aged 74); Deer Park, Florida, U.S.
- Cause of death: Heart disease
- Resting place: Salt Lake City Cemetery; 40°46′37.92″N 111°51′28.8″W
- Spouse(s): Alberta Wright (m. 1919)
- Children: 6

Henry Dinwoodey Moyle (April 22, 1889 – September 18, 1963) was a member of the Quorum of the Twelve Apostles and the First Presidency of the Church of Jesus Christ of Latter-day Saints (LDS Church).

== Early life ==
Moyle was born in Salt Lake City, Utah Territory, to politician James Moyle and his wife Alice Dinwoodey. He studied at the University of Utah and served as an LDS Church missionary in Switzerland and in Germany. During World War I, Moyle served in the US military.

Moyle continued his studies at the University of Chicago and Harvard Law School. He was also a student at the School of Mines in Freiberg, Saxony.

== Employment ==
Moyle was for many years a lawyer and a part-time member of the University of Utah faculty. He was also a businessman involved in various railroad, trucking, oil, insurance and finance businesses. During World War II, he was the director of the Petroleum Board.

== LDS Church Service ==
From 1927 to 1937, Moyle was the president of the LDS Church's Cottonwood Stake, located in the south-east suburbs of Salt Lake City. He also served as chairman of the church's Welfare Committee.

=== Apostle and member of the First Presidency ===
Moyle was ordained an apostle and member of the Quorum of the Twelve Apostles on April 10, 1947. Moyle served as Second Counselor in the First Presidency to church president David O. McKay from June 12, 1959, to October 12, 1961, when he was called as First Counselor. He was First Counselor in the First Presidency until his death.

Moyle was a successful cattleman and originated the idea of the church establishing a cattle ranch in Florida. He was convinced that Florida's climate would prove ideal for raising cattle, as the key to success in that industry is growing grass. The church bought the original 54,000-acre (220 km^{2}) tract in 1950, and over 50 years, the ranch grew to more than 312,000 acres (1,260 km^{2}). Deseret Cattle and Citrus Ranch, which is southeast of Orlando, is today the world's largest beef ranch, and the land is worth an estimated $858 million.

Moyle spearheaded much of the church's building program in the early 1960s. He believed that the Church Office Building, the headquarters of the LDS Church, should have been twice its size. He was also convinced that by building larger meetinghouses, the church would attract more converts. Moyle convinced McKay not to publish an account of church spending as was customary in order to hide the extent of the budget deficit caused by spending on buildings. By 1962, the deficit had reach $32 million. His optimistic building programs placed a considerable financial strain upon the church and McKay eventually relieved Moyle from many of his administrative responsibilities.

The controversial "baseball baptism" program was Moyle's idea to increase baptisms in order to fill the church meetinghouses. Missionaries would encourage young men to join sports leagues and used baptism as a prerequisite. Under this approach, large numbers of young men were baptized but very few were ever active in the church. The rush to baptize was accompanied with the establishment of baptism quotas for missionaries and memorized missionary discussions which were to be delivered verbatim to potential converts. The rest of the apostles were largely opposed to these changes, which led to Moyle being relieved of his responsibilities in the missionary department.

Moyle died of heart disease in Deer Park, Florida, aged 74, and was buried at Salt Lake City Cemetery.

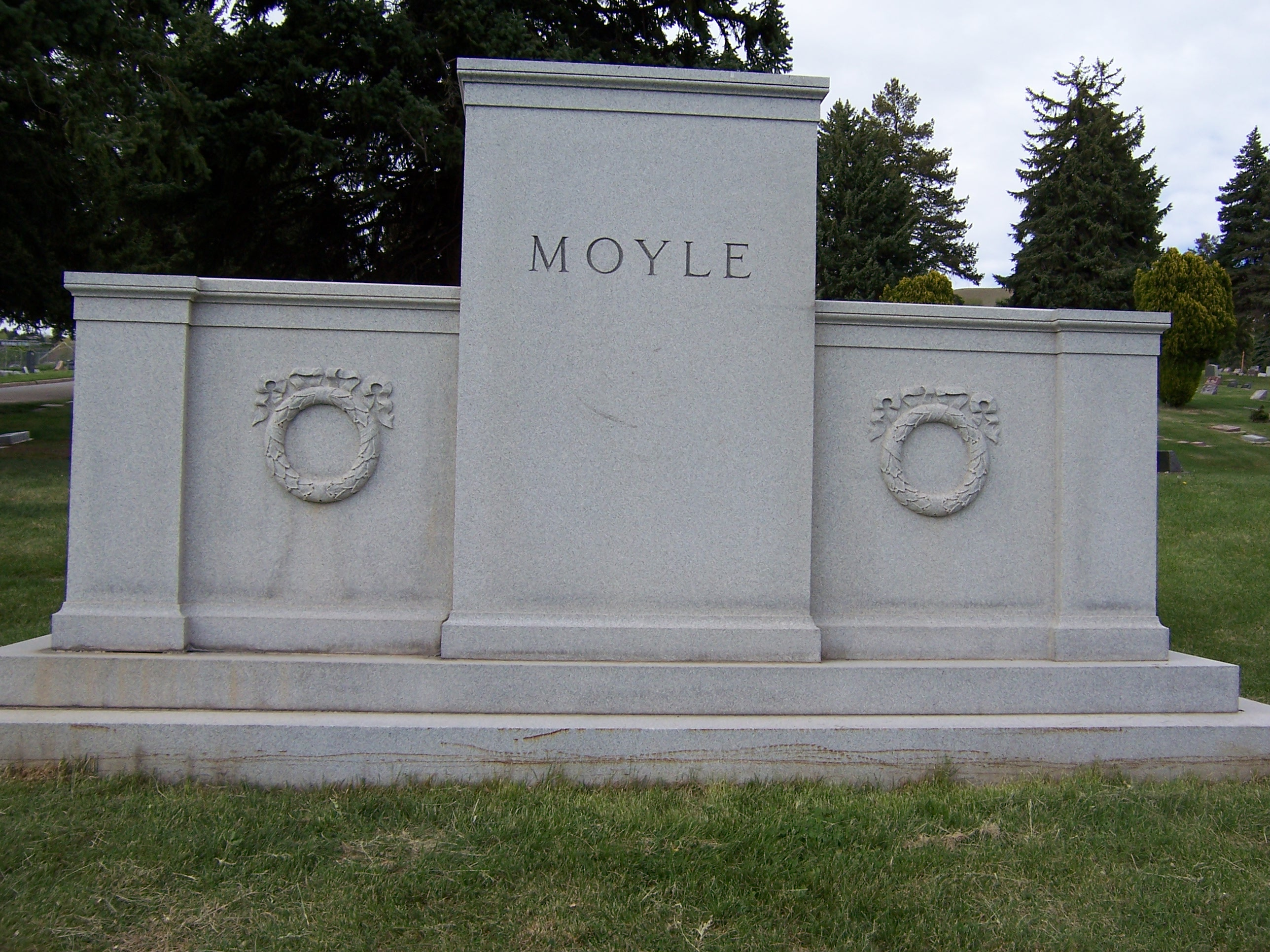
Grave monument to the Moyle family

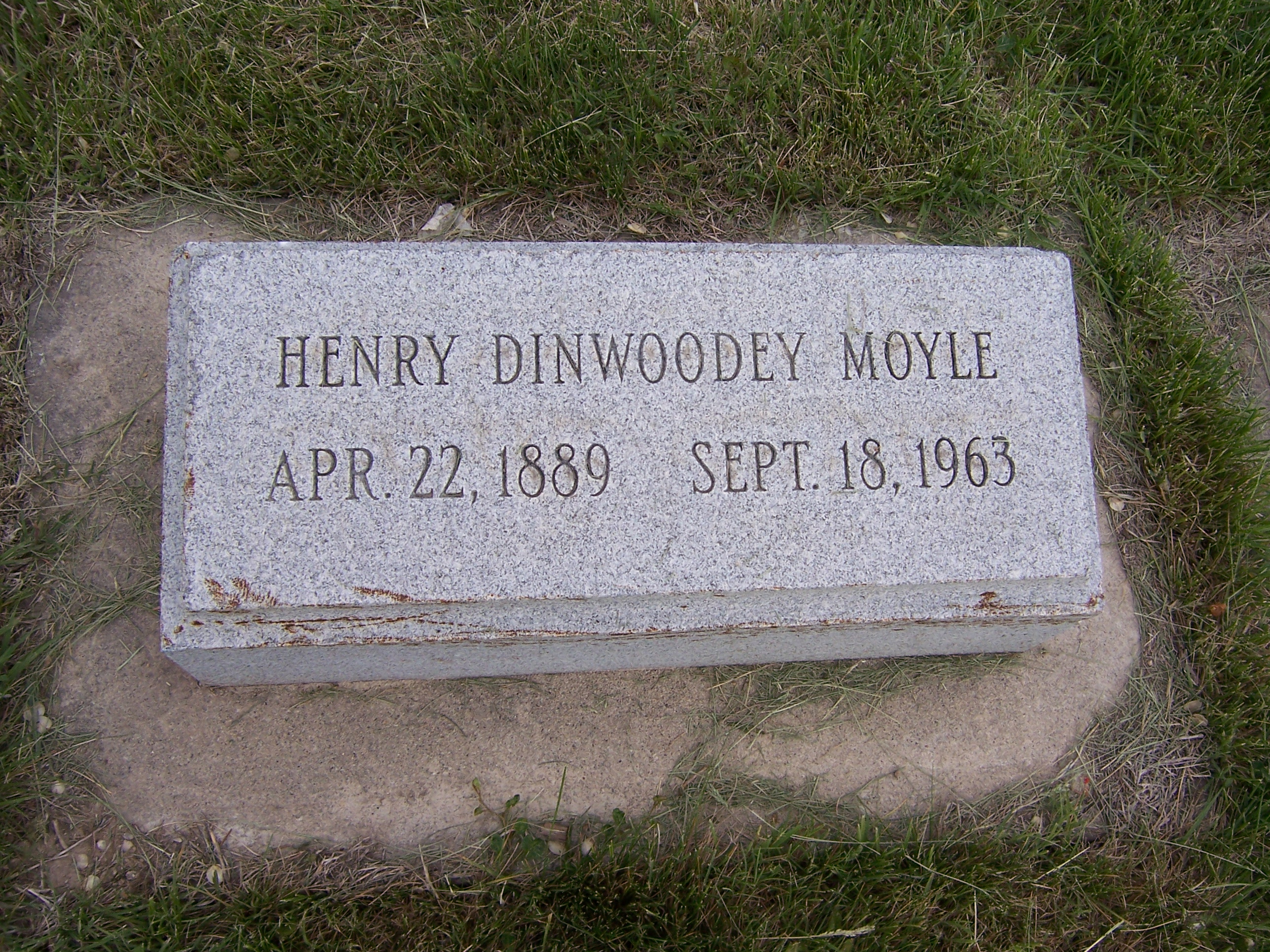
Henry D. Moyle's headstone

== Family ==
In 1920, Moyle married Clara Alberta Wright in the Salt Lake Temple; they were the parents of six children. One of his sons, Henry D. Moyle, Jr., was the first president of the French East Mission (based in Geneva, Switzerland) starting in 1961.

== See also ==
- Alvin R. Dyer

== Sources ==
- Arnold K. Garr, et al., Encyclopedia of Latter-day Saint History, p. 801.

The Church of Jesus Christ of Latter-day Saints titles
| Preceded by J. Reuben Clark | First Counselor in the First Presidency; October 12, 1961 – September 18, 1963 | Succeeded by Hugh B. Brown |
| Preceded by J. Reuben Clark | Second Counselor in the First Presidency; June 12, 1959 – October 12, 1961 | Succeeded by Hugh B. Brown |
| Preceded by Matthew Cowley | Quorum of the Twelve Apostles; April 10, 1947 – June 12, 1959 | Succeeded by Delbert L. Stapley |
