= W. Christopher Waddell =

American religious leader (born 1959)

Presiding Bishop
- November 14, 2025
- Called by: Dallin H. Oaks
- Predecessor: Gérald Caussé

First Counselor in the Presiding Bishopric
- October 3, 2020 – November 14, 2025
- Called by: Russell M. Nelson
- Predecessor: Dean M. Davies
- Successor: L. Todd Budge
- End reason: Called to be presiding bishop

Second Counselor in the Presiding Bishopric
- October 9, 2015 – October 3, 2020
- Called by: Thomas S. Monson
- Predecessor: Dean M. Davies
- Successor: L. Todd Budge
- End reason: Called to be first counselor in the Presiding Bishopric

First Quorum of the Seventy
- April 2, 2011 – October 9, 2015
- Called by: Thomas S. Monson
- End reason: Called to be second counselor in the Presiding Bishopric

Personal details
- Born: Wayne Christopher Waddell; June 28, 1959 (age 67); Los Angeles, California, United States
- Spouse(s): Carol Stansel (married 1984)
- Children: 4

Wayne Christopher Waddell (born June 28, 1959) is an American religious leader who has served as presiding bishop of the Church of Jesus Christ of Latter-day Saints since November 14, 2025. Waddell succeeded Gérald Caussé, who was named to the Quorum of the Twelve Apostles on November 6, 2025. Waddell was called as a church general authority in 2011. Beginning in 2015, he served in the Presiding Bishopric under Caussé, as second counselor (2015–2020) and then as first counselor (2020–2025).

As presiding bishop, Waddell oversees most of the day-to-day temporal operations of the church, including its real estate holdings, financial investments and for-profit entities.

Waddell is from Los Angeles, California and spent his career at Merrill Lynch in a variety of roles, including first vice president of investments. He and his wife, Carol Stansel, have four children.
