= 19th Utah Territorial Legislature =

The 19th Utah Territorial Legislature was elected on August 2, 1869.

== Session ==
The legislative session convened on January 9, 1870, at the City Hall in Salt Lake City, and ended on February 19, 1870.

== Members ==
Name	County	Office	Notes
Territorial Council:
Ezra T. Benson	Cache		Elected, died September 3, 1869
Jacob G. Bigler	Juab		
George Q. Cannon	Salt Lake		
Hector C. Haight	Davis		
Leonard E. Harrington	Utah		
Orson Hyde	Sanpete		
William Jennings	Salt Lake		
George A. Smith	Iron	President	
Abraham O. Smoot	Utah		
Erastus Snow	Washington		
Lorenzo Snow	Box Elder		
Moses Thatcher	Cache		
Wilford Woodruff	Salt Lake		
Joseph A. Young	Salt Lake		
Territorial House of Representatives:
Reddick N. Allred	Sanpete		
Thomas Callister	Millard		
William W. Cluff	Summit/Green River		
David Evans	Utah		
Lorin Farr	Weber		
Abram C. Hatch	Wasatch		
Peter Maughan	Cache		
John R. Murdock	Beaver		
William B. Pace	Utah		
Samuel Pitchforth	Juab		
Orson Pratt	Salt Lake	Speaker	
Enoch Reese	Salt Lake		
Charles C. Rich	Rich		
Franklin D. Richards	Weber		
Albert P. Rockwood	Salt Lake		
John Rowberry	Tooele		
Joseph F. Smith	Salt Lake		
Silas S. Smith	Iron		
Willard G. Smith	Morgan		
William R. Smith	Davis		
George Taylor	Sanpete		
John Taylor	Salt Lake		
Albert K. Thurber	Utah		
Jonathan C. Wright	Box Elder		
Brigham Young Jr.	Salt Lake		
Joseph W. Young	Washington		
