= 23rd Utah Territorial Legislature =

The 23rd Utah Territorial Legislature met in 1878. The regular election for the House of Representatives was held August 7, 1876. The regular election for the Territorial Council was held August 6, 1877.

== Session ==
The legislative session convened on January 14, 1878, at the City Hall in Salt Lake City, and ended on February 23, 1878.

== Members ==
Name	County	Office	Notes
Territorial Council:
Robert T. Burton	Salt Lake		
Thomas Callister	Millard		
William W. Cluff	Summit		
Leonard E. Harrington	Utah		
Alonzo M. Raleigh	Salt Lake		
Silas S. Smith	Iron		
William R. Smith	Davis		
Abraham O. Smoot	Utah		
Erastus Snow	Washington		
Lorenzo Snow	Box Elder	President	
Moses Thatcher	Cache		
Albert K. Thurber	Sanpete		
John W. Young	Salt Lake		
Territorial House of Representatives:
Samuel Atwood	Summit		
Joseph Birch	Washington		
John Brown	Utah		
Albert Carrington	Salt Lake		
Lorin Farr	Weber		
John Fisher	Davis		
Archibald Gardner	Salt Lake		
Joel Grover	Juab		
Abram C. Hatch	Wasatch		
Francis M. Lyman	Millard		
John B. Milner	Utah		
John R. Murdock	Beaver		
William B. Pace	Utah		
David H. Peery	Weber		
Canute Peterson	Sanpete		
Orson Pratt	Salt Lake	Speaker	
William B. Preston	Cache		
Albert P. Rockwood	Salt Lake		
James Sharp	Salt Lake		
Willard G. Smith	Morgan		
Franklin Spencer	Sanpete		
John Taylor	Salt Lake		
George R. Warren	Tooele		
Francis Webster	Iron		
Jonathan C. Wright	Box Elder		
Brigham Young Jr.	Cache		
