= 18th Utah Territorial Legislature =

The 18th Utah Territorial Legislature comprised members of the Territorial Council serving the second year of their terms, together with members of the House of Representatives elected to one-year terms. The regular election for the House was held August 3, 1868.

== Session ==
The legislative session convened on January 11, 1869, at the City Hall in Salt Lake City, and ended on February 19, 1869.

== Members ==
Name	County	Office	Notes
Territorial Council:
Ezra T. Benson	Cache		
Thomas Callister	Millard		
Albert Carrington	Salt Lake		
Hector C. Haight	Davis		
Leonard E. Harrington	Utah		
Orson Hyde	Sanpete		
Aaron Johnson	Utah		
George A. Smith	Iron	President	
Abraham O. Smoot	Salt Lake		
Erastus Snow	Washington		
Lorenzo Snow	Box Elder		
Wilford Woodruff	Salt Lake		
Joseph A. Young	Salt Lake		
Territorial House of Representatives:
William W. Cluff	Summit		
David Evans	Utah		
Lorin Farr	Weber		
Abram C. Hatch	Wasatch		
Francis M. Lyman	Millard		
Peter Maughan	Cache		
Jonathan Midgley	Juab		
John R. Murdock	Beaver		
William B. Pace	Utah		
Orson Pratt	Salt Lake	Speaker	
Enoch Reese	Salt Lake		
Charles C. Rich	Rich		
Albert P. Rockwood	Salt Lake		
John Rowberry	Tooele		
William S. Seely	Sanpete		
Joseph F. Smith	Salt Lake		
Silas S. Smith	Iron		
Willard G. Smith	Morgan		
William R. Smith	Davis		
William Snow	Washington		
George Taylor	Sanpete		
John Taylor	Salt Lake		
Albert K. Thurber	Utah		
Chauncey W. West	Weber		
Jonathan C. Wright	Box Elder		
Brigham Young Jr.	Salt Lake		
