= 22nd Utah Territorial Legislature =

The 22nd Utah Territorial Legislature met in 1876. The regular election for the House of Representatives was held August 3, 1874. The regular election for the Territorial Council was held August 2, 1875.

== Session ==
The legislative session convened on January 10, 1876, at the City Hall in Salt Lake City, and ended on February 18, 1876.

== Members ==
Name	County	Office	Notes
Territorial Council:
Jacob G. Bigler	Millard		
Robert T. Burton	Salt Lake		
John T. Caine	Salt Lake		
William W. Cluff	Summit		
Leonard E. Harrington	Utah		
John W. Hess	Davis		
Jesse N. Smith	Iron		
Abraham O. Smoot	Utah		
Erastus Snow	Washington		
Lorenzo Snow	Box Elder	President	
Warren S. Snow	Sanpete		
Moses Thatcher	Cache		
Wilford Woodruff	Salt Lake		
Joseph A. Young	Sevier		Elected August 2, 1875, died August 5, 1875
Territorial House of Representatives:
George Atkin	Tooele		Election contested, seated February 1, 1876
William Bringhurst	Utah		
John Brown	Utah		
Anson Call	Davis		
Albert Carrington	Salt Lake		
Lorin Farr	Weber		
Joel Grover	Juab		
Abram C. Hatch	Wasatch		
Francis M. Lyman	Millard		
John R. Murdock	Beaver		
William B. Pace	Utah		
Ward E. Pack	Summit		
Charles W. Penrose	Weber		
Canute Peterson	Sanpete		
Orson Pratt	Salt Lake	Speaker	
William B. Preston	Cache		
Albert P. Rockwood	Salt Lake		
Lorenzo W. Roundy	Washington		
John Sharp	Salt Lake		
Silas S. Smith	Iron		
Willard G. Smith	Morgan		
John Taylor	Salt Lake		
Thomas Taylor	Salt Lake		
Albert K. Thurber	Sanpete		
Jonathan C. Wright	Box Elder		
Brigham Young Jr.	Cache		

The House seat from Tooele was caught up in a general dispute over the 1874 election in that county. The Liberal Party, a rough coalition of disaffected Mormons allying with non-Mormon residents of the territory, achieved there its first notable victory over the People's Party supported by the Mormon establishment; the Liberal ticket prevailed in the official results, and Erastus S. Foote was chosen as the territorial House delegate over George Atkin. However, each side attacked the validity of the other's votes, keeping the outcome in doubt as further wrangling ensued.

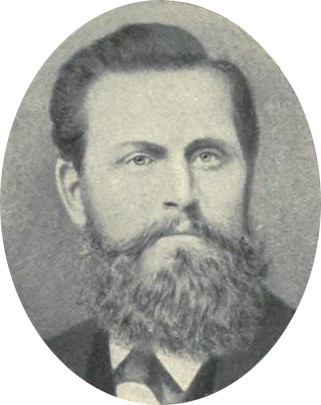
George Atkin contested the Tooele election result and was seated as its House delegate halfway through the session

The Liberals argued that many votes for the People's ticket were illegal, having been cast by alien nationals. With a sizable portion of the Mormon population having immigrated from England, including some of its leaders (Atkin among them), this allegation might disqualify many voters and also render candidates ineligible to serve. Most claimed to be naturalized as Americans, but often had their papers issued by the county probate courts, whose jurisdiction to confer citizenship was further called into question.

For its part, the People's Party faction alleged that many voters were ineligible due to not meeting the requirement of being taxpayers and resident in Utah for six months. This particularly singled out the relatively transient mining settlements in Tooele County, largely non-Mormon districts that overwhelmingly provided the base of Liberal support. It was claimed that up to 80% of their votes should be disqualified. In response, the Liberals wished to assert that many miners were in fact residents, while the failure to enroll them as taxpayers was due to the negligence of territorial officials. They also questioned the treatment of women voters under the circumstances. The territorial legislature had granted women the right to vote in 1870, but they were not required to be on the tax lists, and most women voters were Mormon, in contrast to the predominantly male mining communities.

The federal appointees in the territory, Governor George L. Woods and Chief Justice James B. McKean of the Supreme Court, sided with the Liberals, so Foote was issued the certificate of election and presented himself at the opening of the legislative session. But the House of Representatives, claiming the power to ascertain the qualifications of its own members, opted to consider Atkin's suit to contest the result, and referred the matter to its Committee on Elections. After conducting an investigation, the committee in its report rejected a significant number of ballots for each side that were deemed illegal, but considerably more for Foote, with the result that the election was awarded to Atkin.
