= 15th Utah Territorial Legislature =

The 15th Utah Territorial Legislature was elected on August 7, 1865.

== Session ==
The legislative session convened on December 11, 1865, at the State House in Salt Lake City, and ended on January 19, 1866.

== Members ==
Name	County	Office	Notes
Territorial Council:
Ezra T. Benson	Cache		
George Q. Cannon	Salt Lake		
Albert Carrington	Salt Lake		
Leonard E. Harrington	Utah		
Orson Hyde	Sanpete		
Aaron Johnson	Utah		
Amasa M. Lyman	Millard		
Franklin D. Richards	Davis		
George A. Smith	Iron	President	
Erastus Snow	Washington		
Lorenzo Snow	Box Elder		
Wilford Woodruff	Salt Lake		
Joseph A. Young	Salt Lake		
Territorial House of Representatives:
Thomas Callister	Millard		
William W. Cluff	Summit/Green River		
William J. Cox	Beaver		
David Evans	Utah		
Lorin Farr	Weber		
Jacob Gates	Washington		
John W. Hess	Davis		
William Jennings	Salt Lake		
Benjamin F. Johnson	Utah		
George Kendall	Juab		
Peter Maughan	Cache		
Joseph S. Murdock	Wasatch		
William B. Pace	Utah		
George Peacock	Sanpete		
Charles S. Peterson	Morgan		
Charles C. Rich	Richland		
Albert P. Rockwood	Salt Lake		
John Rowberry	Tooele		
Joseph F. Smith	Salt Lake		
Silas S. Smith	Iron		
Warren S. Snow	Sanpete		
John Taylor	Salt Lake	Speaker	
John Van Cott	Salt Lake		
Chauncey W. West	Weber		
Edwin D. Woolley	Salt Lake		
Jonathan C. Wright	Box Elder		
