= 10th Utah Territorial Legislature =

The 10th Utah Territorial Legislature comprised members of the Territorial Council serving the second year of their terms, together with members of the House of Representatives elected to one-year terms. The regular election for the House was held August 6, 1860. Several vacancies in the Territorial Council were also filled, including due to the resignations of Charles C. Rich and Orson Pratt.

== Session ==
A special session was called for November 12, 1860, prior to the regular scheduled meeting of the legislature in December. Aside from the business of organizing each house, the extra session was primarily for the purpose of assigning the newly arrived justices of the Supreme Court to their respective districts. Once this was done, the legislature promptly adjourned again on November 13.

The regular session convened on December 10, 1860, at the Social Hall in Salt Lake City, and ended on January 18, 1861.

== Members ==
Name	County	Office	Notes
Territorial Council:
Albert Carrington	Salt Lake		
Lorin Farr	Weber		
James Ferguson	Salt Lake		
John T. Hardy	Utah		
Leonard E. Harrington	Utah	President pro tem	
John A. Ray	Millard		
Franklin D. Richards	Salt Lake		
George A. Smith	Iron		
William R. Smith	Davis		
Lorenzo Snow	Box Elder		
Daniel H. Wells	Salt Lake	President	
Edwin Whiting	San Pete		
Wilford Woodruff	Salt Lake		Elected November 5, 1860
Territorial House of Representatives:
Washington F. Anderson	Salt Lake		
Ezra T. Benson	Cache		
Jacob G. Bigler	Juab		
Isaac Bullock	Utah		
Hiram B. Clawson	Salt Lake		
William Crosby	Iron		
Evan M. Greene	Tooele		
Horton D. Haight	Davis		
Lorenzo H. Hatch	Utah		
Rosel Hyde	Davis		
John C. James	Carson		
John V. Long	Salt Lake		
James McGaw	Weber		
John M. Moody	Salt Lake		
William P. Nebeker	Salt Lake		
George Peacock	San Pete		
Albert P. Rockwood	Salt Lake		
Silas S. Smith	Iron		
Hosea Stout	Salt Lake		
John Taylor	Salt Lake	Speaker	
Daniel Thompson	Millard		
Albert K. Thurber	Utah		
Charles W. Wandell	Beaver		
Chauncey W. West	Weber		
Edwin D. Woolley	Salt Lake		

As with the previous legislative session, Green River County did not provide anyone to fill its seat in the House.
