= 20th Utah Territorial Legislature =

The 20th Utah Territorial Legislature met in 1872. The regular election for the House of Representatives was held August 1, 1870. The regular election for the Territorial Council was held August 7, 1871.

== Session ==
The legislative session convened on January 8, 1872, at the City Hall in Salt Lake City, and ended on February 16, 1872.

== Members ==
| Name | County | Office | Notes |
|---|---|---|---|
Territorial Council:
| Jacob G. Bigler | Juab | | |
| George Q. Cannon | Salt Lake | | |
| Leonard E. Harrington | Utah | | |
| Orson Hyde | Sanpete | | |
| William Jennings | Salt Lake | | |
| Jesse N. Smith | Iron | | |
| Lot Smith | Davis | | |
| Abraham O. Smoot | Utah | | |
| Lorenzo Snow | Box Elder | President | |
| William Snow | Washington | | |
| Moses Thatcher | Cache | | |
| Wilford Woodruff | Salt Lake | | |
| Joseph A. Young | Salt Lake | | |
Territorial House of Representatives:
| Thomas Callister | Millard | | |
| David Evans | Utah | | |
| Lorin Farr | Weber | | |
| Abram C. Hatch | Wasatch | | |
| Orrin S. Lee | Summit | | |
| William H. Lee | Davis | | |
| Peter Maughan | Cache | | Elected August 1, 1870, died April 24, 1871 |
| John R. Murdock | Beaver | | |
| William B. Pace | Utah | | |
| George Peacock | Sanpete | | |
| Samuel Pitchforth | Juab | | |
| Orson Pratt | Salt Lake | Speaker | |
| William B. Preston | Cache | | |
| Enoch Reese | Salt Lake | | |
| Charles C. Rich | Rich | | |
| Franklin D. Richards | Weber | | |
| Albert P. Rockwood | Salt Lake | | |
| John Rowberry | Tooele | | |
| Joseph F. Smith | Salt Lake | | |
| Silas S. Smith | Iron | | |
| Willard G. Smith | Morgan | | |
| Warren S. Snow | Sanpete | | |
| John Taylor | Salt Lake | | |
| Albert K. Thurber | Utah | | |
| Jonathan C. Wright | Box Elder | | |
| Brigham Young Jr. | Salt Lake | | |
| Joseph W. Young | Washington | | |
