= 11th Utah Territorial Legislature =

The 11th Utah Territorial Legislature was elected on August 5, 1861.

== Session ==
The legislative session convened on December 9, 1861, at the Court House in Salt Lake City, and ended on January 17, 1862.

== Members ==
Name	County	Office	Notes
Territorial Council:
Ezra T. Benson	Cache		
Albert Carrington	Salt Lake		
William J. Cox	Millard		
James W. Cummings	Utah		
Leonard E. Harrington	Utah		
John W. Hess	Davis		
Orson Hyde	Sanpete		
Franklin D. Richards	Salt Lake		
George A. Smith	Iron		
Lorenzo Snow	Box Elder		
Daniel Spencer	Salt Lake		
Daniel H. Wells	Salt Lake	President	
Wilford Woodruff	Salt Lake		
Territorial House of Representatives:
Thomas Callister	Millard		
Hiram B. Clawson	Salt Lake		
William Crosby	Iron		
Horace S. Eldredge	Salt Lake		
Aaron F. Farr	Weber		
Thomas Grover	Davis		
Lorenzo H. Hatch	Utah		
Joseph Holbrook	Davis		
Benjamin F. Johnson	Utah		
John V. Long	Salt Lake		
Peter Maughan	Cache		
Jonathan Midgley	Juab		
John M. Moody	Salt Lake		
Thomas Rhoads	Summit/Green River		
Albert P. Rockwood	Salt Lake		
John Rowberry	Tooele		
Silas S. Smith	Iron		
Bernard Snow	Sanpete		
Hosea Stout	Salt Lake		
John Taylor	Salt Lake	Speaker	
Edward W. Thompson	Beaver		
Albert K. Thurber	Utah		
Chauncey W. West	Weber		
Edwin D. Woolley	Salt Lake		
Joseph A. Young	Salt Lake		

The House of Representatives had only 25 members instead of the normal 26 because Carson County, to which the vacant seat was allocated, had been separated earlier in 1861 by the creation of Nevada Territory. In response to this, the Legislative Assembly revised county boundaries throughout the territory, dissolving several other smaller counties, and passed a comprehensive reapportionment of the seats for future legislative elections.
