= 21st Utah Territorial Legislature =

The 21st Utah Territorial Legislature met in 1874. The regular election for the House of Representatives was held August 5, 1872. The regular election for the Territorial Council was held August 4, 1873.

== Session ==
The legislative session convened on January 12, 1874, in Salt Lake City, and ended on February 20, 1874.

== Members ==
Name	County	Office	Notes
Territorial Council:
John T. Caine	Salt Lake		
Thomas Callister	Millard		
Jacob Gates	Washington		
Leonard E. Harrington	Utah		
William H. Hooper	Salt Lake		
William Jennings	Salt Lake		
Jesse N. Smith	Iron		
Abraham O. Smoot	Utah		
Lorenzo Snow	Box Elder	President	
Arthur Stayner	Davis		
Moses Thatcher	Cache		
Wilford Woodruff	Salt Lake		
Joseph A. Young	Sevier		
Territorial House of Representatives:
William W. Cluff	Summit		
Lorin Farr	Weber		
Joel Grover	Juab		
George Halliday	Utah		
Abram C. Hatch	Wasatch		
Stephen A. Mann	Salt Lake		
Marriner W. Merrill	Cache		
William Morrison	Sanpete		
John R. Murdock	Beaver		
John Nebeker	Rich		
William B. Pace	Utah		
Edward Partridge Jr.	Millard		
George Peacock	Sanpete		
Orson Pratt	Salt Lake	Speaker	
Franklin D. Richards	Weber		
Albert P. Rockwood	Salt Lake		
Lorenzo W. Roundy	Washington		
John Rowberry	Tooele		
Joseph F. Smith	Salt Lake		
Silas S. Smith	Iron		
Willard G. Smith	Morgan		
William R. Smith	Davis		
John Taylor	Salt Lake		
Albert K. Thurber	Utah		
Jonathan C. Wright	Box Elder		
Brigham Young Jr.	Salt Lake		
