= 16th Utah Territorial Legislature =

1866 Utah Legislative Assembly

The 16th Utah Territorial Legislature comprised members of the Territorial Council serving the second year of their terms, together with members of the House of Representatives elected to one-year terms. The regular election for the House was held August 6, 1866.

== Session ==
The legislative session convened on December 10, 1866, in Salt Lake City, and ended on January 19, 1867.

== Members ==
Name	County	Office	Notes
Territorial Council:
Ezra T. Benson	Cache		
George Q. Cannon	Salt Lake		
Albert Carrington	Salt Lake		
Hector C. Haight	Davis		
Leonard E. Harrington	Utah		
Orson Hyde	Sanpete		
Aaron Johnson	Utah		
Amasa M. Lyman	Millard		
George A. Smith	Iron	President	
Erastus Snow	Washington		
Lorenzo Snow	Box Elder		
Wilford Woodruff	Salt Lake		
Joseph A. Young	Salt Lake		
Territorial House of Representatives:
Thomas Callister	Millard		
William W. Cluff	Summit/Green River		
David Evans	Utah		
Lorin Farr	Weber		
Jacob Gates	Washington		
Thomas H. Giles	Wasatch		
William Jennings	Salt Lake		
Benjamin F. Johnson	Utah		
George Kendall	Juab		
Christopher Layton	Davis		
Peter Maughan	Cache		
Philemon C. Merrill	Morgan		
John R. Murdock	Beaver		
William B. Pace	Utah		
George Peacock	Sanpete		
Enoch Reese	Salt Lake		
Charles C. Rich	Richland		
Albert P. Rockwood	Salt Lake		
John Rowberry	Tooele		
Joseph F. Smith	Salt Lake		
Silas S. Smith	Iron		
Warren S. Snow	Sanpete		
John Taylor	Salt Lake	Speaker	
John Van Cott	Salt Lake		
Chauncey W. West	Weber		
Jonathan C. Wright	Box Elder		

== Major Legislation ==
=== Appropriations ===
- Territorial Appropriation Bill

=== Incorporations of Cities and Counties ===
- An Act to incorporate Beaver City, in Beaver County
- An Act changing the County Seat of Kane County
- An Act to incorporate Fillmore City, in Millard County
- An Act to incorporate the City of Grantsville
- An Act incorporating Brigham City
- An Act incorporating the City of Coalville, in Summit County

=== State Commissions ===
- Resolution appointing a Military Code Commission
