= 12th Utah Territorial Legislature =

The 12th Utah Territorial Legislature comprised members of the Territorial Council serving the second year of their terms, together with members of the House of Representatives elected to one-year terms. The regular election for the House was held August 4, 1862.

== Session ==
The regular session convened on December 8, 1862, at the Court House in Salt Lake City, but the legislators promptly decided to relocate to the Council House and continued meeting there. The session concluded on January 16, 1863.

== Members ==
Name	County	Office	Notes
Territorial Council:
Ezra T. Benson	Cache		
Albert Carrington	Salt Lake		
William J. Cox	Millard		
James W. Cummings	Utah		
Leonard E. Harrington	Utah		
John W. Hess	Davis		
Orson Hyde	Sanpete	President pro tem	
Franklin D. Richards	Salt Lake		
George A. Smith	Iron		
Lorenzo Snow	Box Elder		
Daniel Spencer	Salt Lake		
Daniel H. Wells	Salt Lake	President	
Wilford Woodruff	Salt Lake		
Territorial House of Representatives:
Reddick N. Allred	Sanpete		
George W. Bean	Wasatch		
Thomas Callister	Millard		
Hiram B. Clawson	Salt Lake		
Thomas Dunn	Weber		
Lorin Farr	Weber		
Timothy B. Foote	Juab		
Madison D. Hambleton	Sanpete		
Lorenzo H. Hatch	Utah		
Aaron Johnson	Utah		
Eli B. Kelsey	Tooele		
John V. Long	Salt Lake		
Amasa M. Lyman	Beaver		
Peter Maughan	Cache		
Orson Pratt	Washington	Speaker	
William B. Preston	Cache		
Thomas Rhoads	Summit/Green River		
Albert P. Rockwood	Salt Lake		
Silas S. Smith	Iron		
Judson L. Stoddard	Davis		
John Stoker	Davis		
John Taylor	Salt Lake		
Albert K. Thurber	Utah		
Edwin D. Woolley	Salt Lake		
Jonathan C. Wright	Box Elder		
Joseph A. Young	Salt Lake		
