= 14th Utah Territorial Legislature =

The 14th Utah Territorial Legislature comprised members of the Territorial Council serving the second year of their terms, together with members of the House of Representatives elected to one-year terms. The regular election for the House was held August 1, 1864.

== Session ==
The legislative session convened on December 12, 1864, at the State House in Salt Lake City, and ended on January 21, 1865.

== Members ==
Name	County	Office	Notes
Territorial Council:
Ezra T. Benson	Cache		
Albert Carrington	Salt Lake		
Leonard E. Harrington	Utah		
Orson Hyde	Sanpete		
Aaron Johnson	Utah		
Amasa M. Lyman	Millard		
Charles C. Rich	Davis		
George A. Smith	Iron	President	
Erastus Snow	Washington		
Lorenzo Snow	Box Elder		
Daniel Spencer	Salt Lake		
Wilford Woodruff	Salt Lake		
Joseph A. Young	Salt Lake		Elected August 1, 1864
Territorial House of Representatives:
Reddick N. Allred	Sanpete		
William Anderson	Sanpete		
Henry W. Brizzee	Summit/Green River		
Thomas Callister	Millard		
David Cluff Jr.	Utah		
William J. Cox	Beaver		
Lorin Farr	Weber		
Jacob Gates	Washington		
Horton D. Haight	Davis		
Joseph E. Johnson	Utah		
John V. Long	Salt Lake		
Peter Maughan	Cache		
Charles S. Peterson	Morgan		
Samuel Pitchforth	Juab		
William B. Preston	Cache		
Franklin D. Richards	Salt Lake		
Albert P. Rockwood	Salt Lake		
John Rowberry	Tooele		
Silas S. Smith	Iron		
John Taylor	Salt Lake	Speaker	
Albert K. Thurber	Utah		
John Van Cott	Salt Lake		
William M. Wall	Wasatch		
Chauncey W. West	Weber		
Edwin D. Woolley	Salt Lake		
Jonathan C. Wright	Box Elder		
