= 9th Utah Territorial Legislature =

The 9th Utah Territorial Legislature was elected on August 1, 1859.

== Session ==
The legislative session convened on December 12, 1859, at the Social Hall in Salt Lake City, and ended on January 20, 1860.

== Members ==
Name	County	Office	Notes
Territorial Council:
Albert Carrington	Salt Lake		
Lorin Farr	Weber		
James Ferguson	Salt Lake		
Leonard E. Harrington	Utah		
Benjamin F. Johnson	Utah		
Amasa Lyman	Millard		
Orson Pratt	Salt Lake		
Charles C. Rich	Davis		
Franklin D. Richards	Salt Lake		
George A. Smith	Iron		
Lorenzo Snow	Box Elder		
Daniel H. Wells	Salt Lake	President	
Edwin Whiting	San Pete		
Territorial House of Representatives:
Seth M. Blair	Salt Lake		
John Brown	Utah		
Isaac Bullock	Utah		
David Candland	Salt Lake		
John D. Chase	Juab		
Hiram B. Clawson	Salt Lake		
William Crosby	Iron		
Crandall Dunn	Weber		
Evan M. Greene	Tooele		
Thomas Grover	Davis		
Joseph Holbrook	Davis		
Thomas R. King	Millard		
John M. Moody	Salt Lake		
Albert P. Rockwood	Salt Lake		
Silas S. Smith	Iron		
Bernard Snow	San Pete		
Hosea Stout	Salt Lake		
John Taylor	Salt Lake	Speaker	
Albert K. Thurber	Utah		
Charles W. Wandell	Beaver		
Chauncey W. West	Weber		
Edwin D. Woolley	Salt Lake		
Jonathan C. Wright	Box Elder		
Joseph A. Young	Salt Lake		

Carson County, in the western part of the territory, did not send its allotted member of the House of Representatives, likely because residents were growing dissatisfied with being governed from Salt Lake and had begun lobbying to be split off into Nevada Territory. Additionally, the full complement of 26 House members would have included a seat for Green River County, but it is not known why the county failed to send a representative.
