= 13th Utah Territorial Legislature =

The 13th Utah Territorial Legislature was elected on August 3, 1863.

== Session ==
The legislative session convened on December 14, 1863, at the State House in Salt Lake City, and ended on January 22, 1864.

== Members ==
Name	County	Office	Notes
Territorial Council:
Ezra T. Benson	Cache		
Albert Carrington	Salt Lake		
Leonard E. Harrington	Utah		
Orson Hyde	Sanpete		
Aaron Johnson	Utah		
Amasa Lyman	Millard		
Charles C. Rich	Davis		
George A. Smith	Iron		
Erastus Snow	Washington		
Lorenzo Snow	Box Elder		
Daniel Spencer	Salt Lake		
Daniel H. Wells	Salt Lake	President	
Wilford Woodruff	Salt Lake		
Territorial House of Representatives:
Reddick N. Allred	Sanpete		
Thomas Callister	Millard		
David Cluff Jr.	Utah		
Ira Eldredge	Summit/Green River		
Lorin Farr	Weber		
Jefferson Hunt	Weber		
Joseph E. Johnson	Utah		
John V. Long	Salt Lake		
Henry Lunt	Iron		
Peter Maughan	Cache		
John Patten	Sanpete		
Samuel Pitchforth	Juab		
Orson Pratt	Washington		
William B. Preston	Cache		
Franklin D. Richards	Salt Lake		
Albert P. Rockwood	Salt Lake		
John Rowberry	Tooele		
William R. Smith	Davis		
John Stoker	Davis		
John Taylor	Salt Lake	Speaker	
Albert K. Thurber	Utah		
John Van Cott	Salt Lake		
William M. Wall	Wasatch		
Charles W. Wandell	Beaver		
Edwin D. Woolley	Salt Lake		
Jonathan C. Wright	Box Elder		
