= 25th Utah Territorial Legislature =

Legislative session of the Utah Territory

The 25th Utah Territorial Legislature met in 1882. The regular election for the Territorial Council and the House of Representatives was held August 1, 1881.

== Session ==
The legislative session convened on January 9, 1882, in Salt Lake City, and ended on March 10, 1882.

== Members ==
Name	County	Office	Notes
Territorial Council:
Peter Barton	Davis		
John T. Caine	Salt Lake		
William W. Cluff	Summit		
John R. Murdock	Beaver		
Joseph F. Smith	Salt Lake	President	
Abraham O. Smoot	Utah		
Erastus Snow	Washington		
Lorenzo Snow	Box Elder		
George Teasdale	Juab		
Moses Thatcher	Cache		
Albert K. Thurber	Sanpete		
Daniel H. Wells	Salt Lake		
Territorial House of Representatives:
Samuel F. Atwood	Summit		
Henry Beal	Sanpete		
Elias H. Blackburn	Piute		
John E. Booth	Utah		
Edward Dalton	Iron		
Wilson H. Dusenberry	Utah		
Lorin Farr	Weber		
Samuel Francis	Morgan		
Abram C. Hatch	Wasatch		
John Jaques	Salt Lake		
William D. Johnson Jr.	Kane		
William H. Lee	Rich		
Francis M. Lyman	Tooele	Speaker	
Jonathan S. Page	Utah		
Edward Partridge	Millard		
David H. Peery	Weber		
Charles W. Penrose	Salt Lake		
Canute Peterson	Sanpete		
William B. Preston	Cache		
James Sharp	Salt Lake		
John Henry Smith	Salt Lake		
Oliver G. Snow	Box Elder		
Hosea Stout	Salt Lake		
Samuel R. Thurman	Utah		
