= 8th Utah Territorial Legislature =

The 8th Utah Territorial Legislature comprised members of the Territorial Council serving the second year of their terms, together with members of the House of Representatives elected to one-year terms.

== Session ==
The legislative session convened amid some confusion on December 13, 1858. While newly installed Governor Alfred Cumming summoned the Legislative Assembly to meet in Fillmore at the Territorial Statehouse, only a minority of legislators appeared there when the session opened. It is not clear if Cumming was aware that the 1856 session of the legislature had abandoned Fillmore and relocated the capital to Salt Lake City, but on that basis a quorum of both houses initially met at the Social Hall in Salt Lake. The Salt Lake City group adjourned and traveled to Fillmore where the session resumed with the majority of the legislature on December 18. The legislators apparently were able to convince Cumming of the inadequate accommodations in Fillmore and inconvenience relative to population centers, especially as the Governor's office was also in Salt Lake. The Assembly thus passed a resolution with his approval to adjourn again and re-convene in Salt Lake City on December 27. The session then concluded as scheduled on January 21, 1859.

== Members ==
Name	County	Office	Notes
Territorial Council:
Lewis Brunson	Millard		
Albert Carrington	Salt Lake		
Lorin Farr	Weber		
Leonard E. Harrington	Utah		
Joseph Holbrook	Davis		
Benjamin F. Johnson	Utah		
Heber C. Kimball	Salt Lake		
Franklin D. Richards	Salt Lake		
George A. Smith	Iron		
Lorenzo Snow	Box Elder		
Warren S. Snow	San Pete		
Daniel H. Wells	Salt Lake	President	
Wilford Woodruff	Salt Lake	President pro tem	
Territorial House of Representatives:
Jacob G. Bigler	Juab		
Hiram B. Clawson	Salt Lake		
Robert D. Covington	Iron		
James W. Cummings	Salt Lake		
Philo T. Farnsworth	Millard		
Isaac C. Haight	Iron		
Samuel Henderson	Davis		
William H. Hooper	Salt Lake		Resigned December 29, 1858
Orson Hyde	Salt Lake		
Aaron Johnson	Utah	Speaker pro tem	
Jesse C. Little	Salt Lake		
Alexander McRae	Salt Lake		
William J. Osborn	Green River		
George Peacock	San Pete		
Charles C. Rich	Davis		
Samuel W. Richards	Salt Lake		
Albert P. Rockwood	Salt Lake		
John Rowberry	Tooele		
James C. Snow	Utah		
Daniel Spencer	Salt Lake		
Hosea Stout	Salt Lake		
John Taylor	Salt Lake	Speaker	
Preston Thomas	Utah		
Chauncey W. West	Weber		
Edwin D. Woolley	Salt Lake		
Jonathan C. Wright	Box Elder		
Joseph A. Young	Salt Lake		

As the Mormon population had evacuated northern Utah settlements in the face of the Utah Expedition, the election did not entirely follow previous apportionments. Carson County did not send a representative after a disputed election, and with the US Army effectively occupying Green River County, two additional representatives were elected from Salt Lake County instead. However, when the legislature returned to Salt Lake from their detour in Fillmore, William J. Osborn, a civilian teamster attached to the expedition, presented himself with a certificate of election as the representative from Green River. The issue was resolved by having one of the representatives from Salt Lake resign (William H. Hooper), and Osborn became the first member of the territorial legislature who was not a member of The Church of Jesus Christ of Latter-day Saints.
