= 24th Utah Territorial Legislature =

The 24th Utah Territorial Legislature met in 1880. The regular election for the House of Representatives was held August 5, 1878. The regular election for the Territorial Council was held August 4, 1879.

== Session ==
The legislative session convened on January 12, 1880, at the City Hall in Salt Lake City, and ended on February 21, 1880.

== Members ==
Name	County	Office	Notes
Territorial Council:
Peter Barton	Davis		
John T. Caine	Salt Lake		
William W. Cluff	Summit		
William Fotheringham	Beaver		
Leonard E. Harrington	Utah		
Marriner W. Merrill	Cache		
Joseph F. Smith	Salt Lake		
Abraham O. Smoot	Utah		
Erastus Snow	Washington		
Lorenzo Snow	Box Elder	President	
George Teasdale	Juab		
Albert K. Thurber	Sanpete		
Daniel H. Wells	Salt Lake		
Territorial House of Representatives:
Albert Carrington	Salt Lake		
Wilson H. Dusenberry	Utah		
Lorin Farr	Weber		
John Fisher	Davis		
Samuel Francis	Morgan		
Archibald Gardner	Salt Lake		
Joel Grover	Juab		
Abram C. Hatch	Wasatch		
Joseph S. Horne	Sanpete		
John Jaques	Salt Lake		
William D. Johnson Jr.	Kane		
Francis M. Lyman	Tooele		
Archibald McKinnon	Rich		
John R. Murdock	Beaver		
Ward E. Pack	Summit		
David H. Peery	Weber		
Charles W. Penrose	Salt Lake		
Canute Peterson	Sanpete		
Orson Pratt	Salt Lake	Speaker	
William B. Preston	Cache		
James Sharp	Salt Lake		
Jesse N. Smith	Iron		
George D. Snell	Utah		
Oliver G. Snow	Box Elder		
Daniel Thompson	Millard		
William H. Winn	Utah		
