= 26th Utah Territorial Legislature =

Legislative session of the Utah Territory

The 26th Utah Territorial Legislature met in 1884. The regular election for the Territorial Council and the House of Representatives was held August 6, 1883. The election was conducted under the oversight of a commission appointed under the provisions of the Edmunds Act to exclude polygamists from participating.

== Session ==
The legislative session convened on January 14, 1884, at the City Hall in Salt Lake City, and ended on March 14, 1884.

== Members ==
Name	County	Office	Notes
Territorial Council:
Joseph Barton	Davis		
William W. Cluff	Summit	President	
Heber J. Grant	Salt Lake		
Joel Grover	Juab		
James T. Hammond	Cache		
Robert W. Heyborne	Iron		
Jonathan S. Page	Utah		
Franklin S. Richards	Weber		
Heber J. Richards	Salt Lake		
William W. Taylor	Salt Lake		
Luther T. Tuttle	Sanpete		
Edwin G. Woolley	Washington		
Territorial House of Representatives:
Charles L. Anderson	Tooele		
John Boyden	Summit		
Caleb D. Brinton	Salt Lake		
John Clark	Salt Lake		
William Creer	Utah		
Benjamin F. Cummings Jr.	Cache		
Wilson H. Dusenberry	Utah		
Philo T. Farnsworth Jr.	Beaver		
Samuel Francis	Morgan		
Abram C. Hatch	Wasatch		
John Houston	Garfield		
Joseph Howell	Cache		
Rees R. Llewellyn	Sanpete		
John H. Morgan	Salt Lake		
David H. Peery	Weber		
John Rider	Kane		
Joseph V. Robison	Millard		
James Sharp	Salt Lake	Speaker	
Oliver G. Snow	Box Elder		
Joseph Stanford	Weber		
Albert D. Thurber	Sevier		
Samuel R. Thurman	Utah		
George Webb	Utah		
Don Carlos Young	Salt Lake		

The disqualification of polygamists produced significant turnover in the legislature, which was much less experienced than previous bodies. William W. Cluff, the only member of the Territorial Council to return from the previous session, was chosen as its president. In the House, only Oliver G. Snow, Wilson H. Dusenberry, Samuel R. Thurman, James Sharp, Samuel Francis, Abram Hatch, and David H. Peery were able to be re-elected (in addition, Jonathan S. Page moved from the House in 1882 to the council in 1884).

Crossover between the legislature and ecclesiastical leadership in the LDS Church was also dramatically reduced. Where the 1882 legislative session had included six members of its Quorum of the Twelve Apostles, in 1884 only Heber J. Grant, the sole monogamist in the quorum, was able to serve. (Grant would marry two additional wives later in 1884 and thus did not return in the 1886 session.) However, the legislature still included several regional leaders (stake presidents), including Cluff, Snow, and Hatch.
