= 7th Utah Territorial Legislature =

The 7th Utah Territorial Legislature was elected on August 3, 1857.

== Session ==
The legislative session convened on December 14, 1857, at the Social Hall in Salt Lake City, and ended on January 22, 1858.

== Members ==
Name	County	Office	Notes
Territorial Council:
Lewis Brunson	Millard		
Albert Carrington	Salt Lake		
Lorin Farr	Weber		
Leonard E. Harrington	Utah		
Joseph Holbrook	Davis		
Benjamin F. Johnson	Utah		
Heber C. Kimball	Salt Lake	President	
Franklin D. Richards	Salt Lake		
George A. Smith	Iron		
Lorenzo Snow	Box Elder		
Warren S. Snow	San Pete		
Daniel H. Wells	Salt Lake		
Wilford Woodruff	Salt Lake		
Territorial House of Representatives:
Reddick N. Allred	Davis		
Jacob G. Bigler	Juab		
Isaac Bullock	Green River		
Hiram B. Clawson	Salt Lake		
James W. Cummings	Salt Lake		
Philo T. Farnsworth	Millard		
Isaac C. Haight	Iron		
Orson Hyde	Salt Lake		
Aaron Johnson	Utah		
John D. Lee	Iron		
Jesse C. Little	Salt Lake		
Alexander McRae	Salt Lake		
John D. Parker	Davis		
George Peacock	San Pete		
William W. Phelps	Salt Lake		
Samuel W. Richards	Salt Lake		
Albert P. Rockwood	Salt Lake		
John Rowberry	Tooele		
James C. Snow	Utah		
Daniel Spencer	Salt Lake		
Hosea Stout	Salt Lake		
John Taylor	Salt Lake	Speaker	
Preston Thomas	Utah		
Chauncey W. West	Weber		
Jonathan C. Wright	Box Elder		
Joseph A. Young	Salt Lake		

Although the existing apportionment of the territory would have allocated one representative in the House to Carson County, for this session none was elected and Salt Lake County instead sent an additional representative for a total of 12.
