= 28th Utah Territorial Legislature =

Legislative session of the Utah Territory

The 28th Utah Territorial Legislature met in 1888. The regular election for the Territorial Council and the House of Representatives was held August 1, 1887. Earlier in the year, the Edmunds-Tucker Act had further overhauled elections in the territory, disenfranchising women voters (most of whom were Mormon) and requiring that men registering to vote take an oath that they would obey anti-bigamy laws (in particular, the earlier Edmunds Act of 1882). The territory was also reapportioned into new electoral districts.

== Session ==
The legislative session convened on January 9, 1888, in Salt Lake City, and ended on March 11, 1888.

== Territorial Council ==
- President: Elias A. Smith
- People's Party: 10
- Liberal Party: 2

=== Members ===
Name	Party	District	County
William A.C. Bryan	People's	10	Juab
John E. Carlisle	People's	1	Cache
Richard Howe	People's	7	Salt Lake
Thomas Marshall	Liberal	5	Salt Lake
Christian F. Olsen	People's	2	Cache
Lewis W. Shurtliff	People's	3	Weber
Elias A. Smith	People's	6	Salt Lake
Abraham O. Smoot Jr.	People's	8	Utah
Luther T. Tuttle	People's	11	Sanpete
John P. Wimmer	People's	9	Emery
Edwin G. Woolley	People's	12	Washington
John M. Young	Liberal	4	Salt Lake

== House of Representatives ==
- Speaker: William W. Riter
- People's Party: 21
- Liberal Party: 3

=== Members ===
Name	Party	District	County
Clarence E. Allen	Liberal	8	Salt Lake
John Clark	People's	10	Salt Lake
William Creer	People's	15	Utah
Philo T. Farnsworth Jr.	People's	22	Beaver
Abram C. Hatch	People's	18	Wasatch
Levi P. Helm	People's	14	Salt Lake
Robert W. Heyborne	People's	23	Iron
Enos D. Hoge	Liberal	12	Salt Lake
Joseph Howell	People's	2	Cache
Ricy H. Jones	People's	3	Box Elder
Elias S. Kimball	People's	1	Rich
William H. King	People's	19	Millard
Anthon H. Lund	People's	20	Sanpete
David C. McLaughlin	Liberal	7	Summit
Nathaniel Montgomery	People's	5	Weber
James H. Moyle	People's	11	Salt Lake
Charles C. Richards	People's	4	Weber
William W. Riter	People's	9	Salt Lake
Thomas F. Roueche	People's	6	Davis
William H. Seegmiller	People's	21	Sevier
George M. Spencer	People's	13	Salt Lake
William T. Stewart	People's	24	Kane
Samuel R. Thurman	People's	16	Utah
Lyman S. Wood	People's	17	Utah

In a possible attempt at subterfuge during the election, at Park City in District 7 there was an independent ticket circulating which matched the Liberal ticket except that it substituted a different candidate for the House in place of David C. McLaughlin. While McLaughlin still won the seat, a saloon debate over the matter resulted in a man being shot and killed.
