= 29th Utah Territorial Legislature =

The 29th Utah Territorial Legislature met in 1890. The regular election for the Territorial Council and the House of Representatives was held August 5, 1889.

== Session ==
The legislative session convened on January 13, 1890, in Salt Lake City, and ended on March 15, 1890.

== Territorial Council ==
- President: Franklin S. Richards
- People's Party: 10
- Liberal Party: 2

=== Members ===
Name	Party	District	County
Joseph Barton	People's	1	Davis
Edward Benner	Liberal	4	Salt Lake
John E. Booth	People's	8	Utah
William A.C. Bryan	People's	10	Juab
William G. Collett	People's	7	Tooele
William C. Hall	Liberal	5	Salt Lake
Abram C. Hatch	People's	9	Wasatch
Robert C. Lund	People's	12	Washington
Christian F. Olsen	People's	2	Cache
Charles C. Richards	People's	3	Weber
Franklin S. Richards	People's	6	Salt Lake
William H. Seegmiller	People's	11	Sanpete

== House of Representatives ==
- Speaker: James Sharp
- People's Party: 18
- Liberal Party: 6

=== Members ===
Name	Party	District	County
Clarence E. Allen	Liberal	12	Salt Lake
Heber Bennion	People's	13	Salt Lake
William Creer	People's	15	Utah
Josiah M. Ferrin	People's	5	Weber
Edward P. Ferry	Liberal	7	Summit
James T. Hammond	People's	1	Cache
Joseph Howell	People's	2	Cache
J. Lycurgus Johnson	People's	18	Uintah
James N. Kimball	Liberal	4	Weber
William Lowe	People's	3	Box Elder
Christian N. Lund	People's	20	Sanpete
James A. Melville	People's	19	Millard
Frank Pierce	Liberal	9	Salt Lake
Joseph R. Porter	People's	6	Morgan
William K. Reid	People's	21	Sanpete
Willis E. Robison	People's	22	Beaver
Thomas W. Russell	People's	14	Salt Lake
William P. Sargent	People's	23	Garfield
James Sharp	People's	11	Salt Lake
W.H. Smith	Liberal	8	Juab
William T. Stewart	People's	24	Kane
Samuel R. Thurman	People's	16	Utah
A.L. Williams	Liberal	10	Salt Lake
Lyman S. Wood	People's	17	Utah
