= 3rd Utah Territorial Legislature =

The 3rd Utah Territorial Legislature was elected on August 1, 1853.

== Session ==
The legislative session convened on December 12, 1853, in Salt Lake City, and ended on January 20, 1854.

== Members ==
Name	County	Office	Notes
Territorial Council:
Jonathan Browning	Weber		
Lorin Farr	Weber		
Leonard E. Harrington	Utah		
Orson Hyde	Salt Lake		Elected, did not serve
Aaron Johnson	Utah		
Heber C. Kimball	Salt Lake		
Isaac Morley	San Pete		
James McGaw	Millard		
Parley P. Pratt	Salt Lake		
Willard Richards	Salt Lake	President	
George A. Smith	Iron		
Thomas S. Smith	Davis		
John Taylor	Salt Lake		
Daniel H. Wells	Salt Lake		
Territorial House of Representatives:
Albern Allen	Weber		
Ezra T. Benson	Tooele		
Jacob G. Bigler	Juab		
Albert Carrington	Salt Lake		
James W. Cummings	Salt Lake		
William Felshaw	Millard		
Jedediah M. Grant	Salt Lake	Speaker	
Madison D. Hambleton	San Pete		
Dwight Harding	Weber		
Silas Hillman	Utah		
Joseph A. Kelting	Utah		
Henry W. Miller	Davis		
Calvin C. Pendleton	Iron		
William W. Phelps	Salt Lake		
Franklin D. Richards	Salt Lake		
Albert P. Rockwood	Salt Lake		
Luman A. Shurtliff	Weber		
John L. Smith	Iron		
Erastus Snow	Salt Lake		
James C. Snow	Utah		
Lorenzo Snow	Salt Lake		
William Stewart	Salt Lake		
John Stoker	Davis		
Robert Wiley	Iron		
Wilford Woodruff	Salt Lake		
Jonathan C. Wright	Salt Lake		
