= Mormon Political Manifesto =

Document from the LDS Church

The "Mormon Political Manifesto" (formally, "The Political Rule of the Church") was a document issued by the Church of Jesus Christ of Latter-day Saints (LDS Church) in 1895 to regulate the involvement of its general authorities in politics. Until the mid-1890s, the LDS Church had proactively supported the People's Party and entering politics had been seen as almost a part of several church leader's ecclesiastical responsibilities. Leading up to the issuance of the Manifesto, there was major disagreement about church members entering politics. Utah was transitioning to statehood and to a situation where the two national parties dominated Utah politics, and the church began to adopt a posture of political neutrality.

The leaders of the church, led by Church President Wilford Woodruff, decided to establish a written rule that the general authorities of the church would require the approval of the First Presidency before seeking public office. Apostle Moses Thatcher did not agree with the new rule and in 1896 he was removed from the Quorum of the Twelve Apostles over the issue. B. H. Roberts, a general authority of the church, resisted the Manifesto at first but agreed to it in 1896 under the threat of being removed from his position.

More recently, the LDS Church has taken a more stringent rule on political involvement by its leaders. Current policies prohibit general authorities not only from running for office but also from contributing financially to political campaigns. This policy was implemented in 2011.
