= A Banner Is Unfurled =

A Banner is Unfurled is a Latter-day Saint (LDS) historical fiction series written by Marcie Gallacher and Kerri Robinson and published through Covenant Communications. It is set in the 1820s and follows the Ezekial and Julia Johnson family, a family of 16 children.

== Works in the series ==
1. A Banner Is Unfurled (2005)
2. Be Still My Soul (2006)
3. Glory From On High (2008)
4. Abide With Me (2010)
5. No Greater Love (2012)
