= John M. Moody =

American politician (1822–1884)

John Monroe Moody (February 16, 1822 – 27 January 1884) was a member of the Utah Territorial Legislature beginning in 1859 and later along with his immediate family one of the original settlers of Thatcher, Arizona.

Moody represented Salt Lake City in the territorial legislature from 1859 to 1861. In 1861 he moved to Washington County, Utah and settled in Pine Valley, Utah.

Moody was the bishop of the Thatcher Ward of the Church of Jesus Christ of Latter-day Saints from the organization of the ward in May 1883 until his death the following January.
