= Hiram B. Clawson =

American businessman (1826–1912)

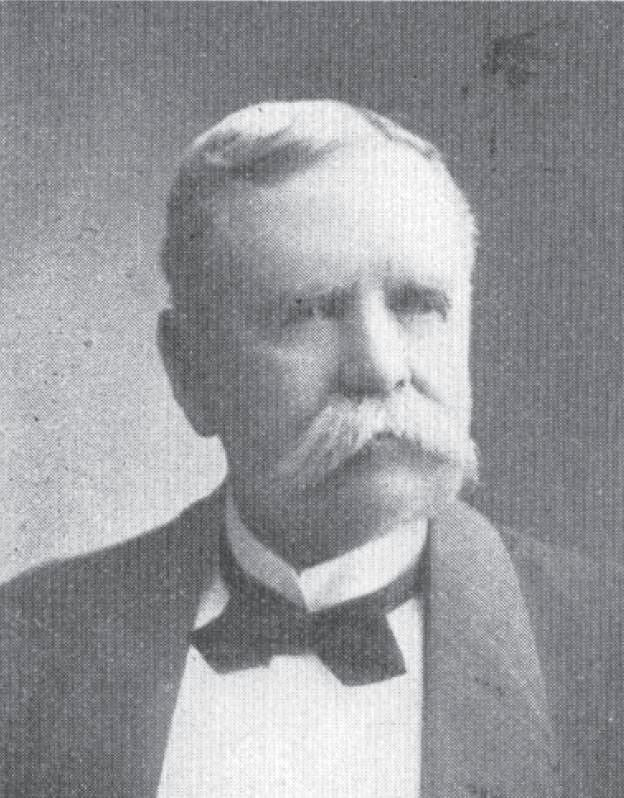

Personal details
- Born: November 7, 1826; Utica, New York, U.S.
- Died: March 29, 1912 (aged 85); Salt Lake City, Utah, U.S.
- Resting place: Salt Lake City Cemetery; 40.7772°N 111.8580°W

Hiram Bradley Clawson (November 7, 1826 – March 29, 1912) was a Latter-day Saint businessman and Church leader in the 19th and early 20th centuries.

== Early life ==
Clawson was born in Utica, New York, to Zephaniah and Catherine Reese Clawson. He was educated at the Utica Academy. In 1838 he joined the Church of Jesus Christ of Latter-day Saints along with his mother. After the death of his father, in 1841 the family including Hiram's three younger siblings moved to church's headquarters in Nauvoo, Illinois.

While in Nauvoo, Clawson became involved in the company of Thomas A. Lyne, an actor and impresario who put on performances in the city and neighboring towns. He learned stagecraft and eventually became a regular performer, as theatrical affairs would remain a significant part of his life.

== Utah career ==
Clawson went west with the Latter-day Saints, arriving in Salt Lake City in 1848. He supervised the building of the first adobe building in Salt Lake City and then was the head mason for the Council House of which Truman Angell was the architect. Also for a time while Angell was away on a mission Clawson served as acting architect of the Salt Lake Temple.

In 1850 Clawson married for the first time, to Ellen Spencer. He also resumed his theatrical activities as the settlers organized a drama company. Clawson appeared in one of the first plays performed in Utah, a production of Robert Macaire at the "Old Bowery", a wooden building set up southeast of the temple construction site. One of his fellow performers was a young woman from Canada, Margaret Judd. Clawson would go on to marry Margaret as his second wife, and the two continued their acting endeavors, sometimes appearing in the same production together.

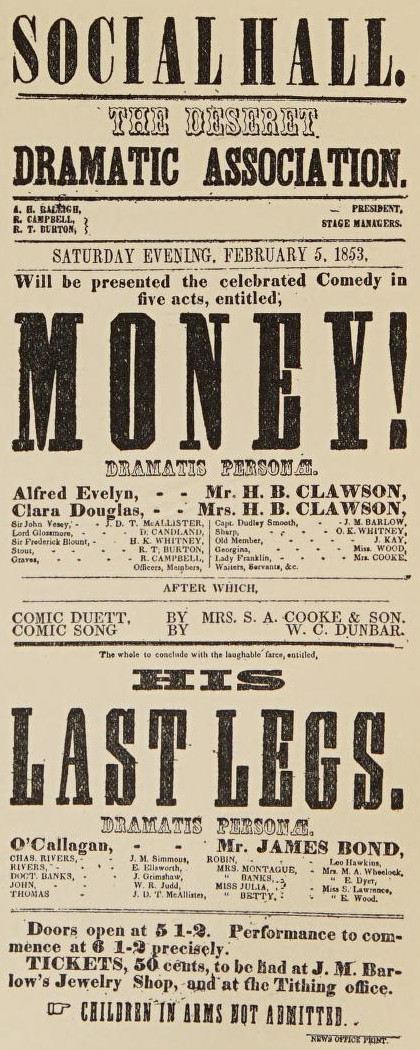
1853 playbill featuring Clawson and his wife Margaret in the leading roles of Bulwer-Lytton's Money!, one of the early performances in the Social Hall which opened that year

When it was decided that the community needed a larger performance hall, Clawson was chosen to manage the construction of the Salt Lake Theatre. He worked with architect William H. Folsom on the project, which began construction in July 1861 and opened with performances the following March. Clawson continued to manage theatre operations for a time after its opening. He succeeded in recruiting Lyne, who had separated from the church in Illinois, to return and lead the company for the 1862-63 season. They also convinced church president Brigham Young to allow one of his daughters, Alice, to perform in the play Virginius, despite Young's dislike of tragedies. Clawson would subsequently marry Alice as his third wife. He eventually married yet another of Young's daughters, Emily, who also had a connection to the theater.

Clawson served as an aide-de-camp to Daniel H. Wells in running the Nauvoo Legion in 1850. He later served as adjutant general of the Legion from 1863 until the legion was disbanded in 1870. Clawson was also elected to seven terms in the House of Representatives of the Utah territorial legislature from 1856 to 1863.

Clawson was a close associate of Brigham Young and for many years served as his business manager. In 1865 Clawson bought out William H. Hooper to become partners with Horace S. Eldredge. Clawson and Eldredge dissolved their firm in 1868 and sold it to Zion's Cooperative Mercantile Institution (ZCMI). Clawson was then the general superintendent of ZCMI from 1868-1873. After being replaced for a short time by Hooper, Clawson took over the head of ZCMI again from 1874-1875. In 1875 Clawson bought the agriculture, hide and wool departments of ZCMI which he ran as an independent business until 1885.

From 1884 until 1902 Clawson served as the bishop of the Twelfth Ward in Salt Lake City. He died in Salt Lake City in 1912.

== Family ==
Clawson had four wives. His first wife was Ellen Curtis Spencer, a daughter of Orson Spencer. Among their children was Spencer Clawson who ran unsuccessfully for mayor of Salt Lake City.

Clawson's second wife was Margaret Gay Judd. One of their children was Rudger Clawson who was a member of the Quorum of the Twelve. Another of their children, Thomas A. Clawson, became a dentist and served in several callings in the LDS Church including succeeding Orson F. Whitney as bishop of the Eighteenth Ward in Salt Lake City.

Clawson's third wife was Alice Young, a daughter of Brigham Young and Mary Ann Angell. Their son John Willard Clawson studied art and became a landscape and portrait painter.

Clawson's fourth wife was Emily Young, a daughter of Brigham Young and Emily Partridge.

Clawson had a total of forty-two children.
