= Benjamin F. Johnson =

American Mormon leader (1818–1905)

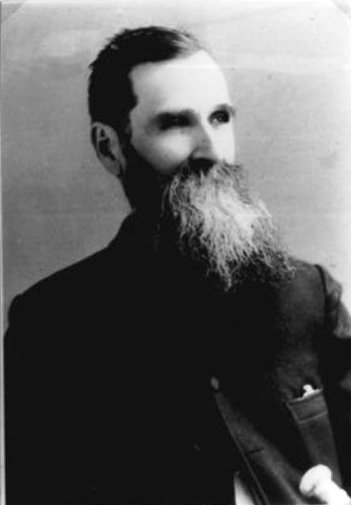

Personal details
- Born: Benjamin Franklin Johnson; July 28, 1818; Chautauqua County, New York, United States
- Died: November 18, 1905 (aged 87); Mesa, Arizona, United States
- Resting place: City of Mesa Cemetery; 33.4383°N 111.8329°W
- Spouse(s): Melissa Bloomfield LeBaron; Mary A. Hale; Sarah Melissa Holman; Susan Adelaide Holman; Sarah J. Spooner; Harriet N. Holman; Flora Clarinda Gleason; Eliza Perkins Dean Saunders
- Parents: Ezekiel Johnson Jr. Julia E. Hills
- Relatives: Joel H. Johnson (brother)

Benjamin Franklin Johnson (July 28, 1818 – November 18, 1905) was an early member of The Church of Jesus Christ of Latter-day Saints, a member of the Council of Fifty, and a private secretary to Joseph Smith. He served fourteen terms in the Utah Territorial Legislature and was also a brickmaker, merchant, tavern keeper, leatherworker, farmer, nurseryman, and beekeeper.

== Early life ==
Born to Ezekiel Johnson and Julia Hills at Pomfret, New York, he moved to Kirtland, Ohio in 1833. He married Melissa Bloomfield LeBaron on Christmas Day, December 25, 1841.

== Latter Day Saint Movement ==
Benjamin was baptized into the Church of the Latter Day Saints at Kirtland by Lyman E. Johnson in the spring of 1835. Heber C. Kimball ordained him an elder March 10, 1839 at Far West, Missouri and John Smith ordained him a high priest in 1843 at Ramus, Illinois. He served as a missionary for his new faith to the eastern United States and Upper Canada between 1840 and 1842. He was appointed to Joseph Smith's Council of Fifty in 1843.

In 1838 he moved to Adam-ondi-Ahman, Missouri where he was arrested and kept under guard for eight days in intensely cold weather before an open campfire. While he was sitting on a log, a "brute" came up to him with a rifle in his hands and said, "You give up Mormonism right now, or I'll shoot you." Benjamin decisively refused, upon which the ruffian took deliberate aim at him and pulled the trigger. The gun failed to discharge. Cursing fearfully, the man declared that he had "used the gun 20 years and it had never before missed fire." Examining the lock, he reprimed the weapon and again aimed and pulled the trigger—without effect. Following the same procedure he tried a third time, but the result was the same. A bystander told him to "fix up his gun a little" and then "you can kill the cuss all right." So for a fourth and final time the would-be murderer prepared, even putting in a fresh load. However, Benjamin declared, "This time the gun bursted and killed the wretch upon the spot." One of the Missourians was heard to say, "You'd better not try to kill that man."

He moved to Springfield, Illinois in 1839, Ramus (later Webster) in 1842, Nauvoo in 1845, and Bonaparte, Iowa Territory in 1846. In 1848 he arrived in the Salt Lake Valley with the Church of Jesus Christ of Latter-day Saints (LDS Church) and served in the Utah territorial legislature from 1855 to 1867. Johnson left Utah for the Arizona Territory in 1882, settling in Tempe before going to Colonia Diaz, Chihuahua, Mexico in 1890 and returning to Arizona in 1892. He died at Mesa.

== Plural marriage ==
Johnson's sister married Joseph Smith as a plural marriage. Johnson records the event where Joseph Smith approached Johnson about the arrangement:

It was Sunday morning, April 3rd or 4th, 1843, that the Prophet was at my home in Ramus, and after breakfast he proposed a stroll together, and taking his arm, our walk led toward a swail, surrounded by trees and tall brush and near the forest line not far from my house. Through the swail ran a small spring brook, across which a tree was fallen and was clean of its bark. On this we sat down and the Prophet proceeded at once to open to me the subject of plural and eternal marriage and he said that years ago in Kirtland the Lord had command him then to take another wife, and that among his first thoughts was to come to my mother for some of her daughters. And as he was again required of the Lord to take more wives, he had come to ask me for my sister Almira.

His words astonished me and almost took my breath. I sat for a time amazed and finally, almost ready to burst with emotion, I looked him straight in the face and said: "Brother Joseph, this is something I did not expect, and I do not understand it. You know whether it is right, I do not. I want to do just as you tell me, and I will try, but if I ever should know that you do this to dishonor and debauch my sister, I will kill you as sure as the Lord lives." And while his eyes did not move from mine, he said with a smile, in a soft tone: "But Benjamin you will never know that, but you will know the principle in time, and will greatly rejoice in what it will bring to you." "But how," I asked, "can I teach my sister what I myself do not understand, or show her what I do not myself see?" "But you will see and understand it," he said, "and when you open your mouth to talk to your sister, light will come to you and your mouth will be full and your tongue loose, and I will today preach a sermon to you that none but you will understand." Both of these promises were more than fulfilled. The text of his sermon was our use of the "one, five and ten talents," and as God had now commanded plural marriage, and was exaltation and dominion of the saints depended upon the number of their righteous posterity, from him who was then but with one talent, it would be taken and given him that had ten, which item of doctrine seems now to be somewhat differently constructed.

But my thought and wish is to write of things just as they occurred, and I now bear an earnest testimony that his other prediction was more than fulfilled, for when with great hesitation and stammering I called my sister to a private audience, and stood before her shaking with fear, just so soon as I found power to open my mouth, it was filled, for the light of the Lord shone upon my understanding, and the subject that had seemed so dark now appeared of all subjects pertaining to our gospel the most lucid and plain; and so both my sister and myself were converted together, and never again did I need evidence or argument to sustain that high and holy principle. And within a few days of this period my sister accompanied me to Nauvoo, where at our sister Delcena's, we soon met the Prophet with his brother Hyrum and Wm. Clayton, as his private secretary, who always accompanied him. Brother Hyrum at once took me in hand, apparently in fear I was not fully converted, and this was the manner of his talk to me: "Now Benjamin, you must not be afraid of this new doctrine, for it is all right. You know Brother Hyrum don't get carried away by worldly things, and he fought this principle until the Lord showed him it was true. I know that Joseph was commanded to take more wives, and he waited until an angel with a drawn sword stood before him and declared that if he longer delayed fulfilling that command he would slay him." This was the manner of Brother Hyrum's teaching to me, which I then did not need, as I was fully converted."

Johnson himself became a noted polygamist, and would eventually have eight wives.

== Relations ==
Johnson was the brother of hymnwriter Joel H. Johnson.

== See also ==
- A Banner Is Unfurled - a historical fiction series about the Johnson family
