= William R. Smith (Utah politician) =

American politician

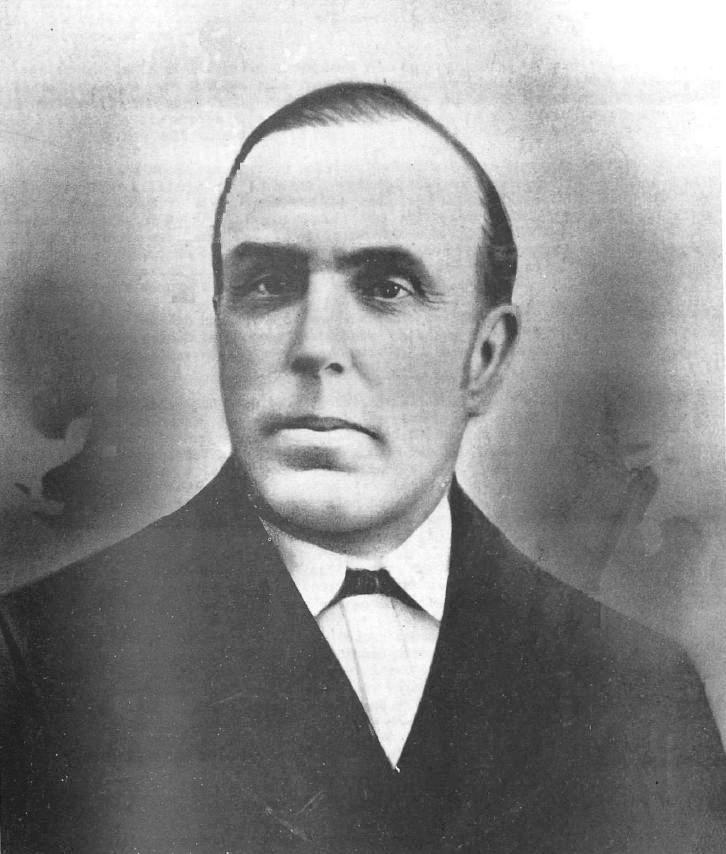

Personal details
- Born: William Reed Smith; August 11, 1826; Yonge Township, Leeds County, Upper Canada
- Died: January 15, 1894 (aged 67); Centerville, Utah Territory, United States
- Resting place: Centerville City Cemetery; 40.913°N 111.868°W
- Spouse(s): 5

William Reed Smith (August 11, 1826 – January 15, 1894, middle name also spelled "Read" and "Reid" in some sources) was a Utah territorial politician, judge, and a leader of the Church of Jesus Christ of Latter-day Saints (LDS Church) in Utah.

== Early life ==
Smith was born in Yonge Township, Leeds County, Upper Canada, as the youngest of nine children born to Peter Smyth (who always spelled his surname with a y, although William R. Smith always spelled his surname with an i). and Mary Read (Read being her maiden surname, which she spelled Read, although William R. Smith usually spelled his middle name Reed). Both of his parents died when he was very young, so at the age of two years and ten months he was taken in by neighbors, Samuel and Fanny Parrish, who raised him to adulthood. The Parrishes raised Smith in the Quaker religion.

In 1837, the Parrishes and Smith moved to Stark County, Illinois. In the late 1830s, as Latter Day Saints began gathering in nearby Nauvoo, the Parishes and Smith became interested in Mormonism. Smith was baptized into the Church of Jesus Christ of Latter Day Saints in 1841, on his 15th birthday.

== LDS Church leadership in Utah ==
In 1849, Smith traveled to the Salt Lake Valley as a Mormon pioneer. In Utah Territory, Smith settled in Centerville. In 1855, Smith was appointed as the bishop of the LDS Church's Centerville Ward, and served in this position until 1877. During his time as bishop, Smith was involved in the Mormon Reformation, and accompanied Jedediah M. Grant in a tour of Utah in which the merits of rebaptism were presented. Smith himself was rebaptized on September 29, 1856.

== Political career ==
In 1860, Smith was elected to represent Centerville in the Territorial Council of Utah Territory (the upper house of the Utah Territorial Legislative Assembly). He was elected to finish the unexpired term of Charles C. Rich, who had resigned so that he could travel to Europe as a missionary for the LDS Church. Smith was subsequently elected to one-year terms in the House of Representatives in 1863 and again in 1870. From 1874 to 1883, Smith was a probate judge in Davis County, Utah.

== Later LDS Church leadership ==
From 1865 to 1867, Smith was a missionary for the LDS Church in England, Ireland, and Scotland. While traveling to and from Europe, he visited relatives in Ontario.

In 1874, Smith was appointed the president of the Centerville branch of the United Order. In 1877, Smith became the first president of the newly organized Davis Stake of the LDS Church, and he served in this position until his death. During his tenure, the first Primary of the LDS Church was organized in his stake boundaries by Aurelia Spencer Rogers.

In 1880, Smith became a member of the LDS Church's Council of Fifty, a body which advised the church on political, economic, and social issues affecting Latter-day Saints.

In 1885, Smith and two other men traveled to western Canada to examine the possibility of establishing Mormon colonies in the area. On this trip, the men investigated a number of potential settlement locations in Alberta south of Lethbridge. Smith purchased a tract of land, which was later settled as Spring Coulee, Alberta. Smith's investigations led to the establishment of Cardston by Charles Ora Card in 1887.

== Bigamy conviction and pardon ==
Like many 19th-century members of the LDS Church, Smith practiced plural marriage, and had five wives simultaneously. In July 1887, Smith was arrested for violating the 1862 Morrill Anti-Bigamy Act (a U.S. federal law). He pleaded guilty, and on March 31, 1888, was sentenced to six months' imprisonment and a $300 fine. Smith was imprisoned until July 20, 1888, when he was pardoned by U.S. President Grover Cleveland.

== Death ==
Smith died in Centerville of "stricture of the bowels"—which today would probably have been identified as colorectal cancer. He had five wives and 30 children, of whom 11 died at birth or pre-deceased him during childhood.
