= Council House (Salt Lake City) =

Coordinates: 40°46′10″N 111°53′28″W

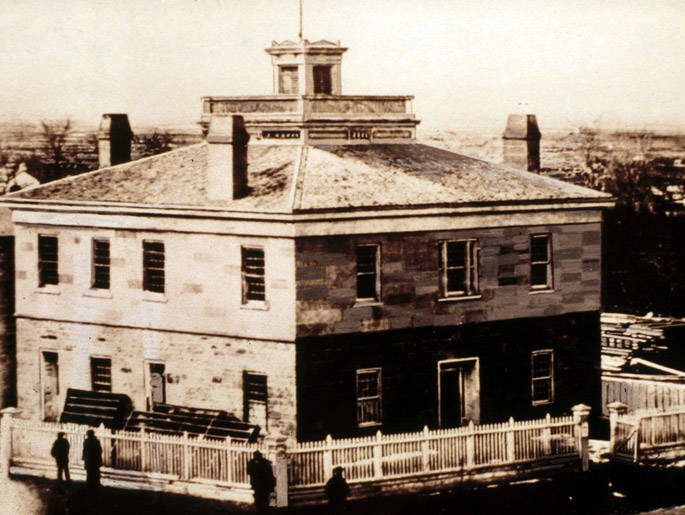
- The Council House in 1869

General information
- Status: Destroyed
- Type: Public/Government
- Location: Salt Lake City, Utah, United States
- Construction started: 1849
- Completed: 1850
- Destroyed: June 21, 1883

Technical details
- Structural system: Stone/Adobe
- Floor count: 2

The Council House, often called the State House, was the first public building in Utah; being constructed in 1849–50. The building stood in Salt Lake City, Utah Territory, on the corner of Main Street and South Temple Street. On June 21, 1883, the building was destroyed when a neighboring wagon depot caught fire and several barrels of gunpowder exploded, spreading the fire to the Council House.

== History ==
The Council House was originally built to accommodate the government of the provisional State of Deseret. Deseret was never officially recognized by the United States Government, and in 1850 the U.S. Congress organized the Utah Territory instead. Following the creation of the territory, it was decided to move Utah's capital city to Fillmore, Utah (because of its centralized location). In Fillmore, the territorial government began construction of the Utah Territorial Statehouse, although the Council House continued to be used for official business until the statehouse was at least partially completed. During the first legislative session held in Fillmore, legislators complained about the lack of housing and adequate facilities in that city, so Salt Lake City was again designated Utah's capital.

Once the capital returned to Salt Lake City, the Council House again was used as territorial offices and also housed several other entities such as the University of Utah, the Deseret News and Deseret Boarding House. The building was also used as a meeting place by the leadership of the Church of Jesus Christ of Latter-day Saints (LDS Church), and endowment sessions were held in the building until the completion of the Endowment House in 1855. Over 2,000 Latter-day Saints received their endowment in the building.

On June 21, 1883, the building was destroyed when a neighboring wagon depot caught fire and several barrels of gunpowder blew up. The explosion and resulting fire destroyed several other buildings, including the offices of photographer Charles Roscoe Savage, and caused damage to a number of nearby buildings, such as ZCMI and the LDS Church tithing office.

=== Later property usage ===
The ruined walls of the Council House stood for several years following the fire, until they were demolished in September 1889. The property then became the home of a temporary (from 1897 to 1899) museum called the "Hall of Relics." The museum had been built for the semicentennial celebration of the arrival of the first Mormon pioneers to the Salt Lake Valley. The temporary museum was then demolished to build a new office building for the Deseret News, which opened in 1902. This structure was later known as the Union Pacific Building, and later still as the Bonneville Telecommunications Building, before being demolished in October 1995. The Beneficial Tower (Gateway Tower West), which opened in 1998, presently sits on the Council House's former location.

== See also ==
- List of historic sites of The Church of Jesus Christ of Latter-day Saints
- Red Brick Store
- Social Hall (Salt Lake City)
- Temple (LDS Church)
