= People's Party (Utah) =

United States political party (1870–1891)

- Founded: 1870
- Dissolved: 1891
- Preceded by: Mormon Reform (1843)
- Ideology: Big tent Latter-day Saints' interests Latter-day Saints' politics Political Mormonism; Populism; Pro-women's suffrage
- Political position: Center to center-right
- Religion: Mormonism (The Church of Jesus Christ of Latter-day Saints)

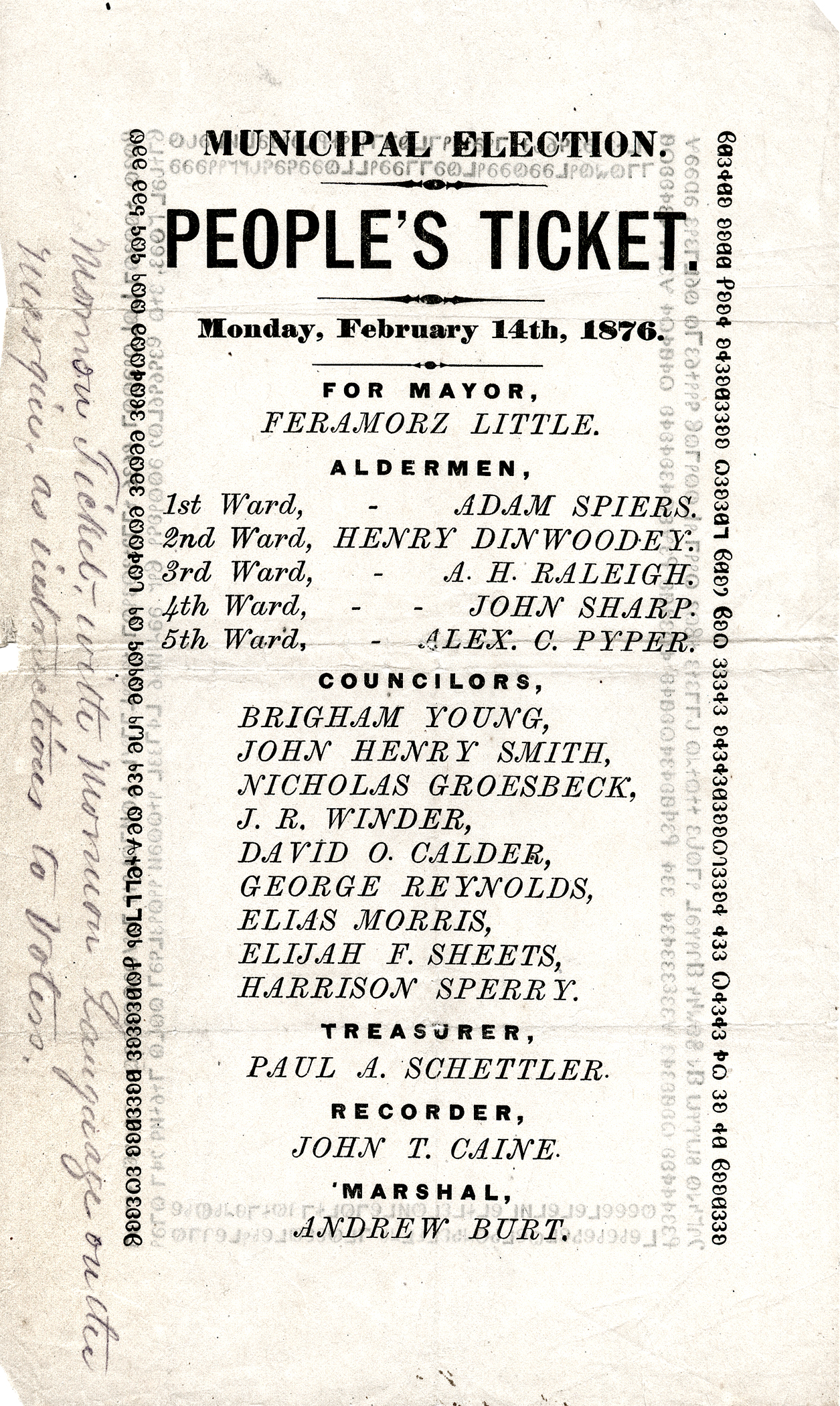
People's Party flyer for the 1876 Salt Lake City municipal election.

The People's Party was a political party in Utah Territory during the late 19th century. It was backed by the Church of Jesus Christ of Latter-day Saints (LDS Church) and its newspaper, the Deseret News. It opposed Utah's Liberal Party, which was often explicitly anti-Mormon.

== Beginnings ==
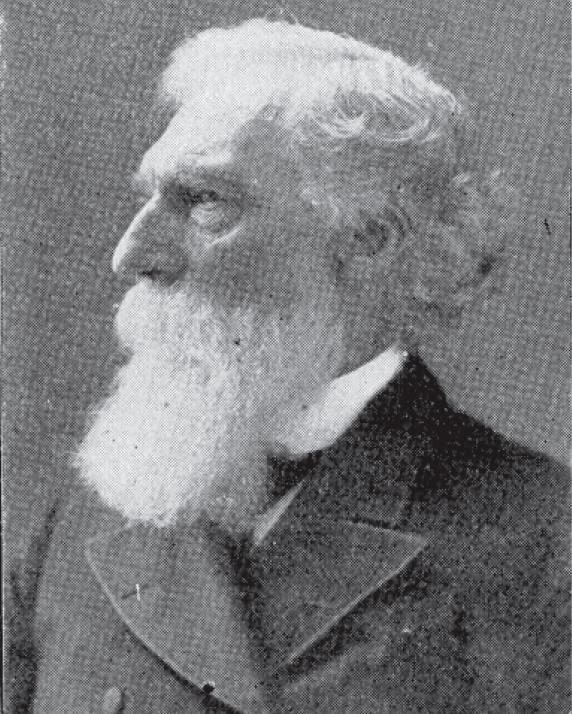
Daniel H. Wells was among the first officials to be elected under the People's Party

The People's Party emerged in 1870 in response to the non-"Mormon" Liberal Party. In fact, the initial slate of candidates for the 1870 Salt Lake City election was approved on February 9 by citizens who had swarmed into the first meeting of Liberals in order to hijack and disrupt it. Daniel H. Wells, the incumbent mayor, easily won the first contested Salt Lake election 2301 to 321.

Previously, political candidates ran without party affiliation, and Latter-day Saint candidates usually found themselves unopposed. With organized opposition to Latter-day Saint candidates, the Latter-day Saint leaders found having their own party expedient. Historian Ronald W. Walker states that the party's name was selected to combat the notion that Brigham Young, himself not an elected official since 1857, was a tyrant. The People's Party, as the name intentionally suggested, claimed to speak for the Latter-day Saints, vast majority of citizens, in Utah Territory.

== History of success ==
With only a handful of defeats, the party was supported by an overwhelming majority in most elections. Championing women's suffrage, with the vote extended to women in the territory in 1870, helped the party emphasize its strength. Most non-Latter-day saints in the territory were men, often miners, and so the People's Party gained a distinct advantage.

Throughout its history, People's Party candidates never lost a statewide election. Local elections were lost to the Liberals, sometimes under dubious circumstances. Examples include the "Tooele Republic" of the 1870s, and after harsh anti-polygamy legislation disqualified many Latter-day Saint voters in the 1880s before the 1890 Manifesto halted further Latter-day Saint plural marriages.

== Dissolution ==
The party disbanded in June 1891 prior to elections for territorial legislature. Members joined the two national parties, with Latter-day Saint leaders striving to direct equal numbers toward each party. With Latter-day Saints Democrats and Republicans competing against Liberal candidates, the Deseret News characterized Liberals as a "bastard party". One political ad asked rhetorically "what is he who votes for a bastard ticket?" Nonetheless, Liberals captured one third of seats in the territorial legislature.

Impetus for dissolving the party came from members of the national parties who believed the territory should follow national political lines before obtaining statehood. The Latter-day Saints Church could not favor either national party because the Latter-day Saints majority in the state would make the preferred party into a new de facto People's Party. Two years later Liberals, also eager for statehood, followed suit, and Utah became the 45th state in the Union on January 4, 1896.
