= Moses Thatcher =

Apostle of the Church of Jesus Christ of Latter-day Saints (1842–1909)

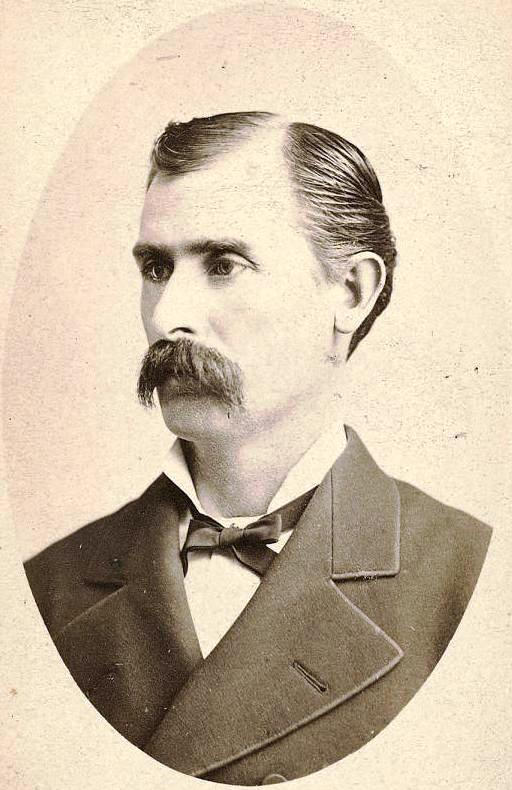

Quorum of the Twelve Apostles
- April 9, 1879 – April 6, 1896
- End reason: Released from the Quorum by a vote of the church

LDS Church Apostle
- April 9, 1879 – August 22, 1909 (Note: Thatcher was released from the Quorum of the Twelve Apostles by a vote of the church in 1896; however, he retained the priesthood office of apostle until his death.)
- Reason: Deaths of Brigham Young and Orson Hyde (Note: After Thatcher was added to the Quorum of the Twelve Apostles it still was only composed of 11 apostles.)
- Reorganization at end of term: No apostles ordained (Note: Since Thatcher was not a member of the Quorum of the Twelve when he died, his death did not create a vacancy that needed to be filled by the calling of a new apostle.)

Personal details
- Born: Moses Thatcher; February 2, 1842; Sangamon County, Illinois, United States
- Died: August 22, 1909 (aged 67); Logan, Utah, United States
- Signature
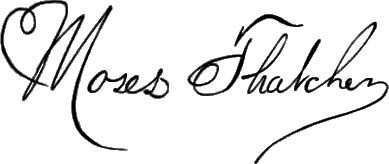

Moses Thatcher (February 2, 1842 – August 22, 1909) was an apostle and a member of the Quorum of the Twelve Apostles in the Church of Jesus Christ of Latter-day Saints (LDS Church). He was one of only a few members of the Quorum of the Twelve to be dropped from the Quorum but to remain in good standing in the church and retain the priesthood office of apostle.

== Early life ==
Thatcher was born in Sangamon County, Illinois, to Hezekiah Thatcher and Alena Kitchen. The Thatcher family joined the Church of Jesus Christ of Latter Day Saints in 1843, and moved to Macedonia, Illinois, and later to Nauvoo. Together, with the main body of the church, they began their trek westward in 1846 and arrived in the Salt Lake Valley in September 1847.

Hezekiah and Alena, with seven of their eight living children (including Thatcher), departed for California in 1849, seeking to acquire wealth through the Gold Rush. They returned to Utah Territory in 1857. Thatcher served a mission for the church at age 15, from which he returned in 1858. In 1859, the family settled in Cache Valley, where Thatcher helped Hezekiah locate canal and mill sites.

From 1860 to 1861, Thatcher studied at the University of Deseret. From 1866 to 1868, he served a second mission, this one to the United Kingdom and France. He later served as the church's mission president in Mexico from October 10, 1879 to February 4, 1880.

== Apostolic service ==
Thatcher became an apostle and a member of the Quorum of the Twelve Apostles in April 1879. He replaced Orson Hyde, who died on November 28, 1878.

From 1880 to 1898, Thatcher was the second assistant to Wilford Woodruff in the superintendency of the Young Men's Mutual Improvement Association (YMMIA).

At the April 1896 General Conference of the church, Thatcher was dropped from the Quorum of the Twelve in consequence of his not being "in harmony" with the other leaders of the church about a proposed policy called "The Political Rule of the Church," commonly referred to as "the political Manifesto." This policy would have required that the general authorities of the church obtain the approval of the First Presidency before seeking public office. This statement was signed by all the apostles at the time except Thatcher, who refused on grounds of conscience, citing the church's long-standing position on political neutrality. (Apostle Anthon Lund also did not sign the document due to his absence while presiding over the church's European Mission.)

However, Thatcher was not excommunicated from the church and retained his position in the leadership of the YMMIA. Thatcher remained supportive of the church after being removed from the Quorum, testifying on many occasions of the divinity of the work and the divinity of the calling of its leaders. Matthias F. Cowley replaced Thatcher in the Quorum of the Twelve. Thatcher held the priesthood office of apostle until his death.

== Post-Quorum of the Twelve service ==
After being removed from the quorum, Thatcher testified in the Reed Smoot hearings held before the Senate Committee on Privileges and Elections. He was supportive of the church and its positions.

Thatcher died at his home on August 22, 1909, in Logan, Utah.

== Notes ==
The Church of Jesus Christ of Latter-day Saints titles
Preceded by Albert Carrington	Quorum of the Twelve Apostles; April 9, 1879 – April, 1896	Succeeded by Francis M. Lyman
