= Salt Lake City Council Hall =

Historic building in Salt Lake City, Utah, U.S.

- Old City Hall
- U.S. National Register of Historic Places
- U.S. National Historic Landmark
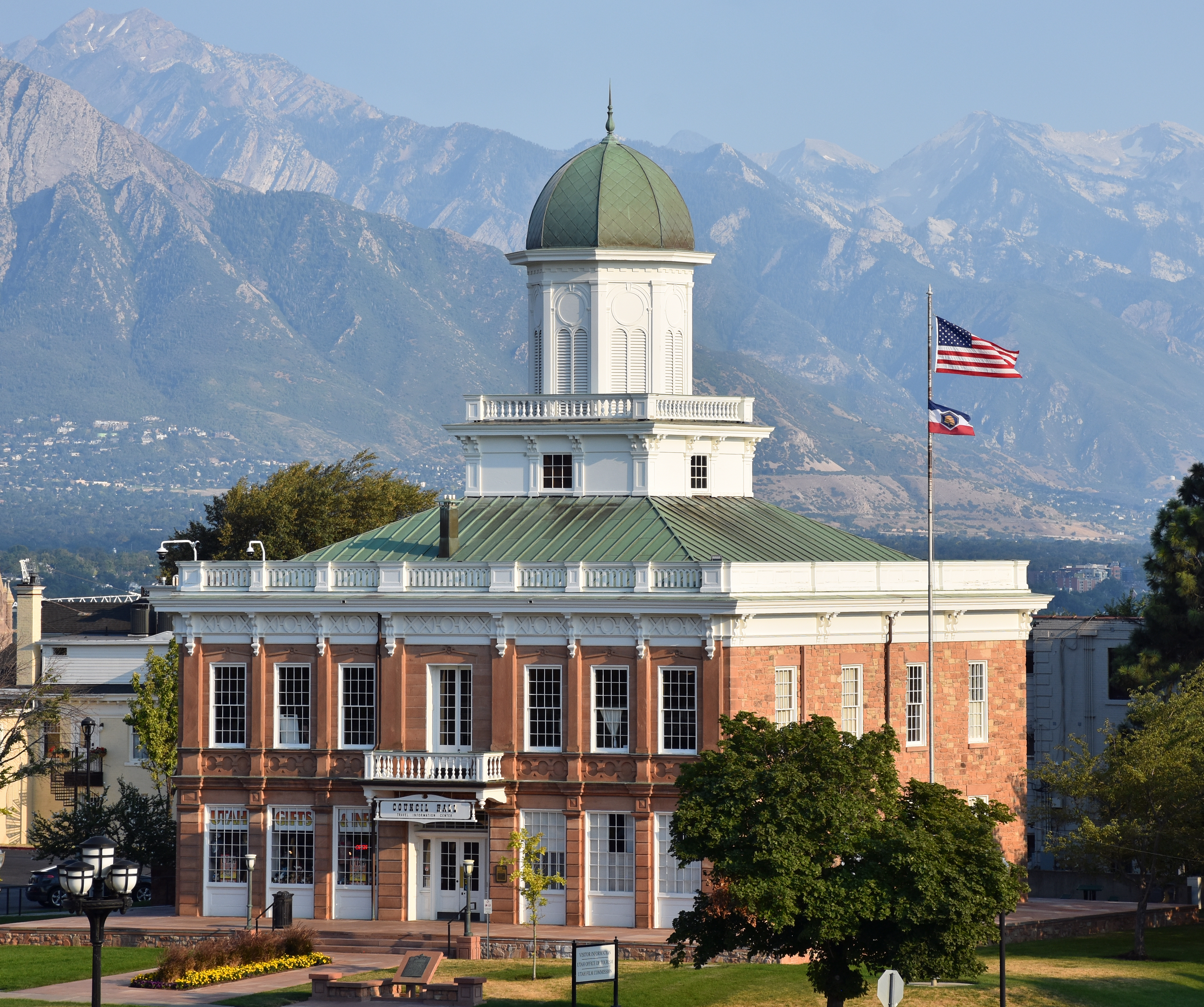
- Council Hall as seen from the State Capitol

- Location within Utah Location within the United States
- Location: Salt Lake City, Utah
- Coordinates: 40°46′33″N 111°53′13″W
- Area: less than one acre
- Built: 1864
- Architect: William H. Folsom
- NRHP reference No.: 71000846

Significant dates
- Added to NRHP: May 14, 1971
- Designated NHL: May 15, 1975

The Salt Lake City Council Hall (also known as the Old Salt Lake City Hall) is a historic building located on Capitol Hill in Salt Lake City, Utah. Built from 1864 to 1866, it was used as the city hall for Salt Lake City from 1866 to 1894. Originally located in the downtown area, it was relocated to its current location in 1961, to make way for construction of the Wallace F. Bennett Federal Building.

Located across the street from the Utah State Capitol, it was designated a National Historic Landmark in 1975, as an emblem of (and site of events relating to) the conflicts between the governments of the Utah Territory and the United States in the 19th century.

== Construction ==
Council Hall was originally Salt Lake City Hall, built to replace an older, smaller city hall completed just six years earlier on the eve of the Utah War, a standoff between Latter-day Saints ("Mormons") and federal troops. This small city hall was almost immediately inadequate for the growing city, so planning work on a new City Hall began by 1863.

Ground for the new hall was broken on February 8, 1864 under the direction of the prolific Salt Lake City architect William H. Folsom who was then the official architect for the Church of Jesus Christ of Latter-day Saints (LDS Church). Built at First South and 120 East (more on Salt Lake City's coordinate system), sandstone for the structure was delivered from Red Butte Canyon on Utah's first chartered railroad. The well-furnished Greek Revival building was completed at a cost of $70,000.

In January 1866, City Hall was dedicated by George Q. Cannon, a prominent LDS leader. Many other LDS leaders attended the dedication including Brigham Young. This is unsurprising because territorial and city politics were controlled by "The People's Party", which was the political organ of the LDS Church. The mayor at the time was People's Party member Abraham O. Smoot, the first of six mayors that would use the building. The People's Party would control Mayor's office until 1890 when the Liberal Party (territorial non-Mormon party) gained control of city government, partially because of anti-polygamy legislation which barred many Mormon polygamists from holding office.

== History ==
Image of Council Hall at its original location at 120 East 100 South, Salt Lake City, c. 1870

Six rooms on the first floor housed the mayor's office and other city departments. From 1866 until the completion of the Salt Lake City and County Building in 1894, the City Hall was the seat of Salt Lake City Government and meeting place for the Utah Territorial legislature. The Rose Room on the second floor served both as a general courtroom and the legislative floor.

On February 14, 1870, Council Hall became the site of the first woman's vote in Utah, when Seraph Young Ford voted in the municipal election that day, making her the first woman to vote under an equal suffrage law in the United States.

The Assembly Hall was often the site of tension between Mormons, non-Mormons, and federal troops, but possibly the most dramatic event occurred in August 1874; Mayor Daniel H. Wells declared martial law from the balcony of City Hall. This was in response to US Marshal arrests of several Salt Lake City police officers in concert with taking over the polls for election of a Utah representative to congress.

After 1894 the city used the Hall as police headquarters until 1915. Following this the building was used in minor capacities by the city.

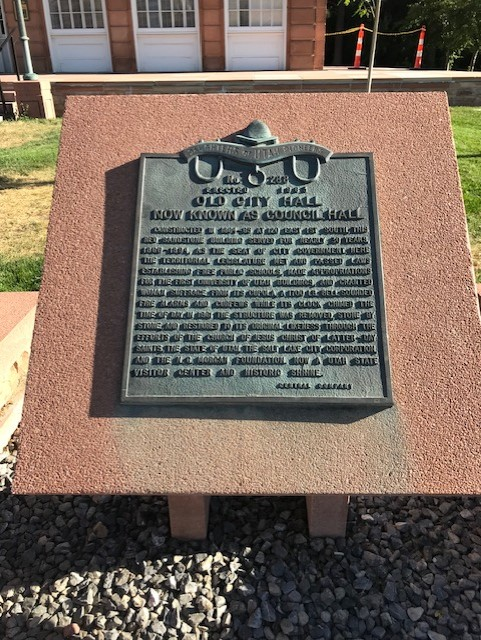
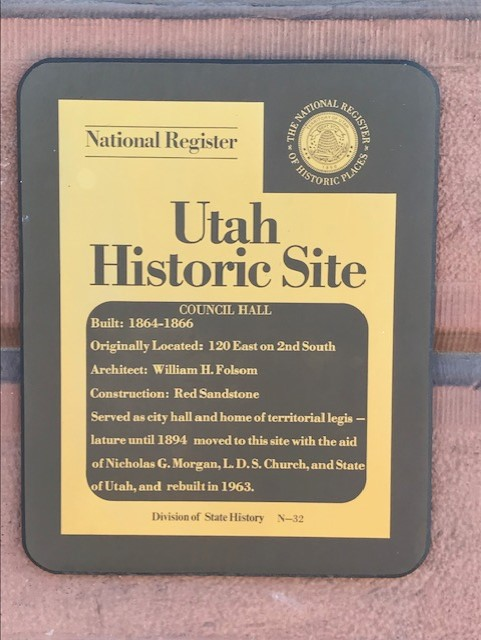
Historic plaques in front of Council Hall

To make way for the federal office building downtown, the old City Hall was relocated to Capitol Hill in 1961. The building itself and land were donated by the city and the LDS Church to the state of Utah. The LDS Church also underwrote most of the $300,000 cost for dismantling the building exterior into 325 sandstone slabs. They were numbered and reassembling around all-new woodwork on Capitol Hill. The state paid for most landscaping, furnishing, and other peripheral work at the building's current location just south of the State Capitol. Restoration was done under the direction of architect Edward O. Anderson, and was mostly finished by 1962. The building was renamed "Council Hall."

== See also ==
- List of National Historic Landmarks in Utah
- National Register of Historic Places listings in Salt Lake City
- White Community Memorial Chapel, neighboring building on Capitol Hill
