= Edwin D. Woolley =

American politician and religious leader

Edwin D. Woolley Sr.
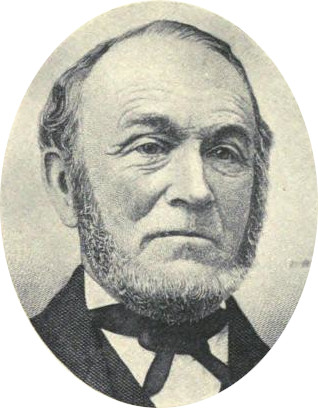

Members of the House of Representatives of the Utah Territorial Legislature

In office
- September 22, 1851 – January 21, 1853

In office
- 1855 – 1856

In office
- 1858 – 1861

Personal details
- Born: Edwin Dilworth Woolley; June 28, 1807; West Chester, Pennsylvania, United States
- Died: October 12, 1881 (aged 74); Salt Lake City, Utah Territory, United States
- Resting place: Salt Lake City Cemetery; 40°46′37.92″N 111°51′28.8″W
- Signature

Edwin Dilworth Woolley Sr. (June 28, 1807 – October 12, 1881) was a Mormon pioneer, an early Latter-day Saint bishop in Salt Lake City, and a businessman in early Utah Territory who operated mills.

Woolley was born in West Chester, Pennsylvania, and raised in a Quaker family. He joined the Church of Jesus Christ of Latter Day Saints in the 1830s and later served as a missionary in Northumberland County, Pennsylvania.

In 1851, Woolley was a member of the Utah Territorial Legislature. For many years Woolley was bishop of the 13th Ward of the Church of Jesus Christ of Latter-day Saints in Salt Lake City. He referred to a member of his ward, the young Heber J. Grant, as lazy, which has been likened to someone calling Abraham Lincoln dishonest.

Woolley was the grandfather of J. Reuben Clark and Spencer W. Kimball, among other Latter-day Saint leaders. He was also the father of John Wickersham Woolley and grandfather of Lorin Calvin Woolley, founding leaders of the Mormon Fundamentalist movement.

== Early life ==
Edwin Dilworth Woolley was born and raised in West Chester, Pennsylvania. His family were initially members of the Society of Friends (Quakers). His mother died in 1826 and in 1831 Woolley married Mary Wickersham. When Woolley's father died in 1832, he and his wife moved with Woolley's six siblings to East Rochester, Ohio, to the Wickersham home. He operated a general store and when coal was discovered on his property he set up a mining operation as well. He became acquainted with Mormon missionaries but his wife was actually the first to convert. After meeting Joseph Smith's family, Woolley decided to convert as well, in 1837. His family followed suit soon afterwards, as well as members of Mary's family. Woolley, being a man of influence and wealth, was appointed to serve as the leader of the East Rochester branch of the church. Woolley continued to prosper and soon was financing Mormon operations and loaning money to the founder of the church, Joseph Smith. He also served an LDS proselytizing mission to West Chester, Pennsylvania.

== Life in Nauvoo ==
Crossing the Mississippi River, the LDS community settled first in Quincy, Illinois in 1839 and then in 1840, Nauvoo, Illinois, which had previously been known as the town of Commerce, Illinois. Woolley operated a general store in Nauvoo. Joseph Smith's claim of a revelation concerning plural marriage was first read in the Woolley home and started the practice of polygamy in the church and soon thereafter Woolley married his second and third wives, Ellen Wilding and Mary Louisa Gordon. When conflict between Mormons and non-Mormons reached a peak and Joseph Smith had been killed by an angry mob, the Illinois legislature asked the Mormons to leave Illinois in 1844 and in 1846 Woolley and his family began the westward trek towards their new home in Utah, which at the time was still land claimed by the Republic of Mexico.

== Life in Utah ==
Arriving in the Salt Lake Valley in 1848, the family was assigned a lot which was at the current location of 300 East and 300 South (now downtown). Woolley also farmed on a tract of land which was just south of the city. As was his custom, he also engaged in merchandising. He was later appointed as the business manager of Brigham Young's many enterprises. He was appointed as bishop (LDS equivalent of a parish leader) of the 13th Ward (LDS equivalent for a parish) in Salt Lake City. This post he served from 1854-1881. Of his time as Brigham Young's business manager and Bishop, Arrington and Bitton wrote:

He was an effective bishop not only because he worked hard but because he was not afraid to take responsibility in his calling. Contrary to the anti-Mormon stereotypes of the nineteenth century, Brigham Young's bishops were not sycophants or lackeys. When they disagreed, he did not call for their resignations but respected them for their exercise of judgment and their right to inspiration. At times, Bishop Woolley demonstrated his independent spirit by resisting new programs and methods...

Woolley family members today who admire the contrariness of their progenitor enjoy the story that once Brigham Young said that if Bishop Woolley should fall off his horse while crossing to the other side of the Jordan, they should not look for him floating downstream. Instead, they would find him swimming upstream, obstinately contending against the current.

On one occasion, according to the family, the bishop and Brigham had a heated discussion about a business deal. President Young, who could be very sarcastic, turned as he was leaving and said, "Now, Bishop Woolley, I guess you will go off and apostatize." To which Edwin rejoined, "If this were your church, President Young, I would be tempted to do so. But this is just as much my church as it is yours, and why should I apostatize from my own church?" Despite their disagreements, Brigham Young dearly loved his outspoken bishop. In a painting commissioned by Brigham Young called "President Young and His Friends," Bishop Woolley is depicted along with Heber C. Kimball, Daniel H. Wells, George A. Smith, and four others.

Woolley also served several terms as a representative in the Utah Territorial Legislature and as Salt Lake County Recorder. In business, he assisted in the forming of the Deseret Telegraph Company and Zion's Cooperative Mercantile Institution (ZCMI). In 1850 he married his fourth wife, Mary Ann Olpin (or Alpin). In 1857, Woolley married his fifth and six wives, Betsy Ann F. Jackman and her adult daughter Elizabeth Ann J. Marshall. These last two wives are not mentioned in some of the literature and it seems that Woolley divorced the two of them and they left the community.
