= John R. Murdock (Mormon) =

American politician (1826–1913)

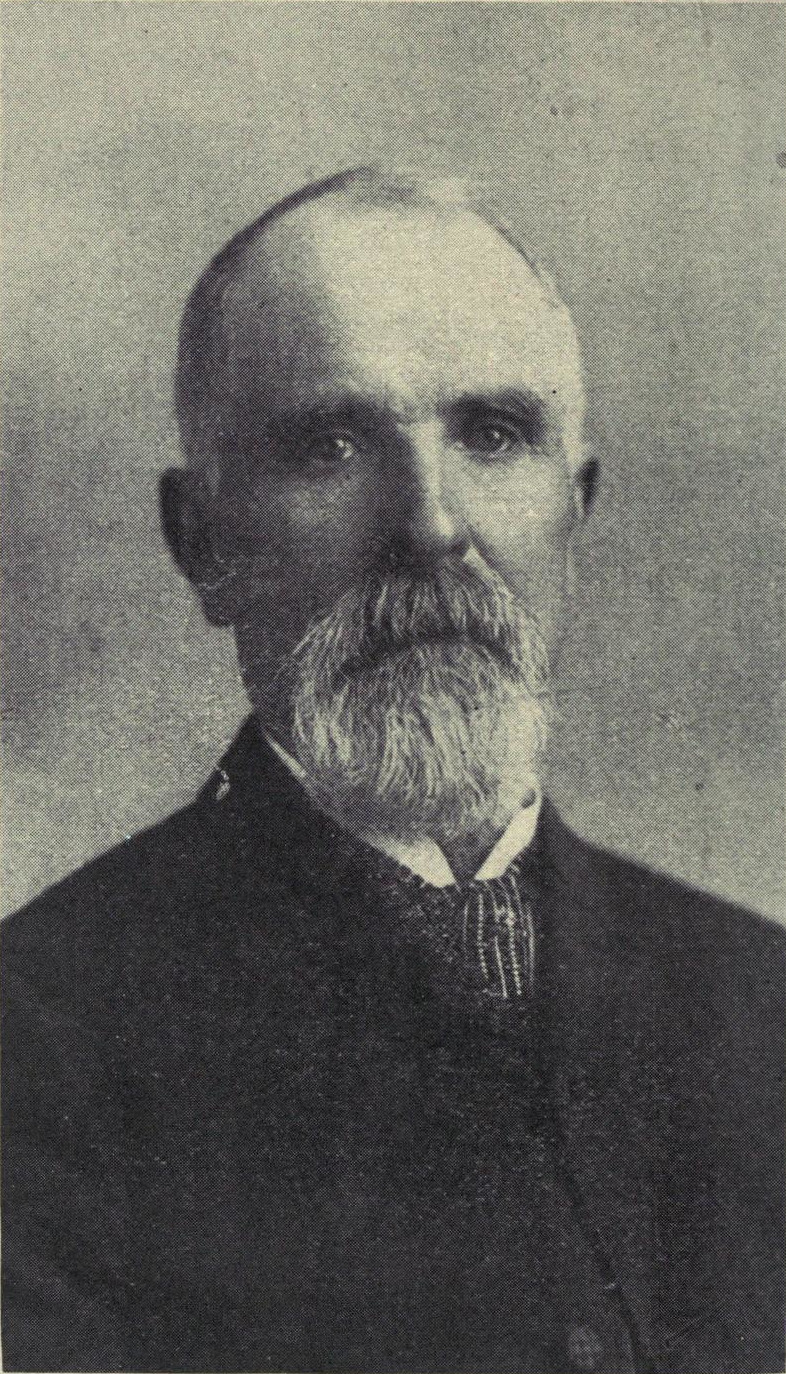
- Murdock c. 1909

Member of the Council of Fifty
- April 10, 1880 – November 12, 1913

Personal details
- Born: John Riggs Murdock; September 13, 1826; Orange, Ohio, United States
- Died: November 12, 1913 (aged 87); Milford, Utah, United States
- Resting place: Mountain View Cemetery; 38.2811°N 112.6306°W
- Organization: Members of the Council of Fifty
- Spouse(s): Almira Henrietta Lott; Mary Ellen Wolfenden; May Bain
- Parents: John Murdock; Julia Clapp
- Signature
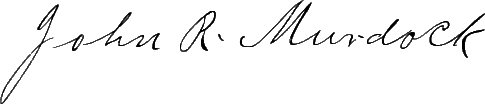

John Riggs Murdock (September 13, 1826 – November 12, 1913) was a Mormon pioneer, Utah politician, and leader of the Church of Jesus Christ of Latter-day Saints in Beaver, Utah. He is sometimes credited as the leader of the most down-and-back companies in Latter-day Saint history, as he directed multiple ox-drawn wagon trains sent from Utah to bring back both merchandise and emigrating church members from back East. Murdock also served several missions in the eastern United States.

== Biography ==
Murdock was born in Orange, Ohio to John Murdock and Julia Clapp Murdock. When he was five years old, his mother died and he was then raised in the home of Philo Judd. In Nauvoo Illinois, Murdock worked on the farm of Joseph Smith. During the exodus from Nauvoo to the west, Murdock lived with the Cornelius Lott family in Nauvoo; Murdock fell in love with and later married Lott's daughter Almira Henrietta Lott. The marriage of Murdock and Lott happened after the arrival in the Salt Lake Valley.

Murdock later married Mary Ellen Wolfenden and May Bain as plural wives.

In 1846, Murdock joined the Mormon Battalion and arrived in Salt Lake City in 1847. After marrying, he settled in Lehi, Utah Territory, in 1851. From 1861 to 1863, served as Mayor of Lehi. In 1856, Murdock was one of the rescuers of the Mormon pioneer handcart companies. In 1861, 1862, 1863, 1864, and 1864, Murdock led down-and-back companies across the plains.

For a time Murdock served as the regional presiding bishop in Beaver County, Utah. Murdock was called to this position in 1864 and it was then that he first went to Beaver.

Murdock was the first president of the Beaver Stake when it was organized in 1869. He served in this position until 1891. He was later ordained a patriarch. As stake president, Murdock essentially ran the government operations in Beaver County while the Mormon-backed People's Party was in control. For example, in the 1870s, John Hunt was appointed as sheriff of Beaver County largely because he was a People's Party supporter.

Murdock served eight terms in the Utah Territorial Legislature. In 1895, he was a representative to the Utah State Constitutional Convention and was a member of the convention's apportionment and boundaries committee. Murdock also served one term as a member of the Utah State House of Representatives.

Murdock was closely involved with the movement to start a secondary school in Southern Utah, so when it was finally begun at Beaver, it was named the Murdock Academy. This institution functioned as a branch of Brigham Young Academy, the predecessor of Brigham Young University.

Murdock died in Beaver at age 87. His is the largest grave marker in Mountain View Cemetery in Beaver. Immediately adjacent are markers for Mary Ellen Wolfenden Murdock and May Bain Murdock, two of his plural wives. At the behest of their second wife, Wolfenden, the location is some distance away from the grave of Almira Henrietta Lott Murdock (d. 1878), her bitter rival who preceded her in death.
