= Peter Maughan =

American politician

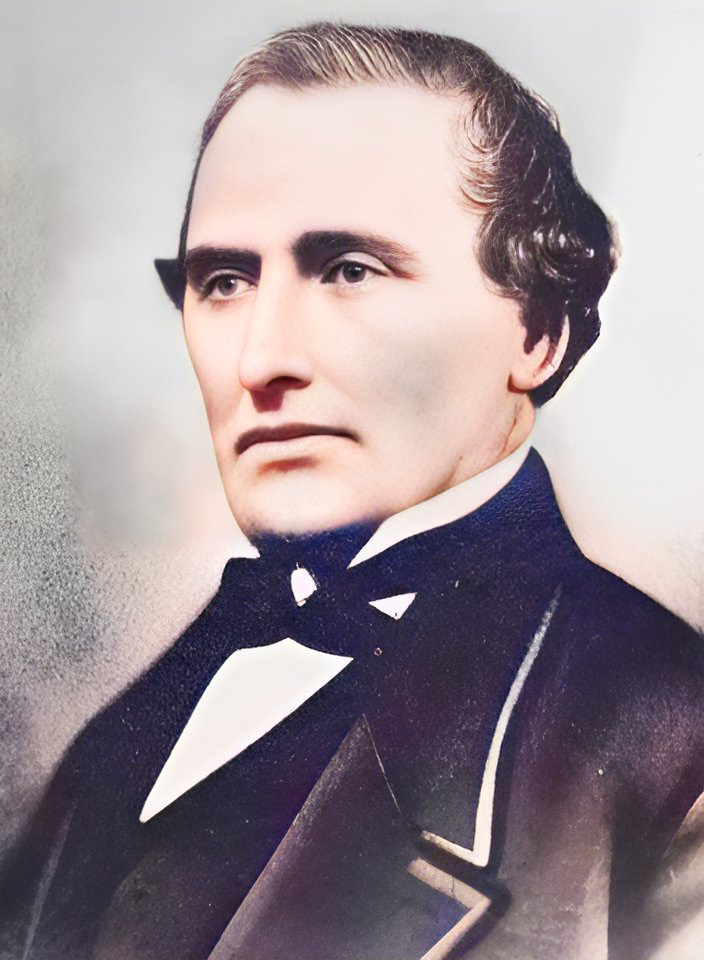
- Born: May 7, 1811; Milton, Cumberland, England
- Died: April 24, 1871 (aged 59); Logan, Utah, United States

Signature
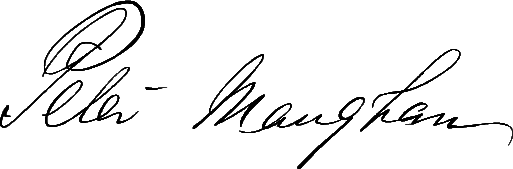

Peter Maughan (May 7, 1811 – April 24, 1871) was an early Mormon pioneer who settled the Cache Valley of Utah under the direction of Brigham Young.

== Life ==
Maughan was the sixth child of William Maughan and Martha Wilson and was born at Milton, Cumberland, England. As a youth, he worked in the lead mines at Alston, England. He married Ruth Harrison on October 1, 1831, and six children were born to them.

Peter and Ruth were baptized members of the Church of Jesus Christ of Latter Day Saints in Alston in 1838 and were active in the branch. Ruth died on March 26, 1841, shortly after the birth of their sixth child. Following the counsel of Brigham Young, who was on a mission in England, Maughan and his children set sail on the Rochester for America, arriving May 19, 1841. Sailing with them were seven of the nine apostles who had been serving in England. The trip also was a sad occasion for Maughan, as he had to bury his baby daughter, Ruth, at sea.

Maughan and his family went to Kirtland, Ohio, for a few weeks where he met a young widow, Mary Ann Weston Davis. When he decided to travel to Nauvoo, Illinois, Davis and her companion were in the same wagon train which allowed them to become more acquainted. After arriving in Nauvoo, they decided they would be married on November 2, 1841. To them were born eight children.

In Nauvoo, Maughan found work as a stonemason on the Nauvoo Temple. The family lived in Nauvoo for about two and a half years before Maughan was sent to Rock Island, Illinois, to mine coal for the families in Nauvoo. When trouble developed in Nauvoo and the Saints were abandoning the city, the family was told to close up the mines in Rock Island and prepare to travel to the West.

The family moved to New Diggings, Wisconsin, in April 1846, where Maughan and the two older sons worked in the lead mines. Money was very scarce and the expense of living with such a large family and outfitting the two wagons needed caused the family to stay in New Diggings until April 1850. After finding lead ore on their own property, they were able to raise the final $800 in 8 weeks and buy the needed equipment and supplies for the long trip to the Salt Lake Valley.

They arrived in Salt Lake City on September 15, 1850, and after resting a week, they were sent to Tooele. When they arrived there the entire settlement consisted of only two log cabins. The settlement quickly grew and Tooele became a County in 1851 and their settlement became Tooele City in 1853. During his time there he served as the first county clerk, a county assessor, a county selectman, a county treasurer, and as a recorder for Tooele City.

In 1853 Maughan, along with Ormus E. Bates and Bishop John Rowberry were tasked as a committee to build a dam across Adobe Creek and to locate a new settlement near it called E.T. City, a name dedicated to LDS Apostle Ezra T. Benson. They worked diligently in constructing the dam in 1854 but it failed to retain water because the water found a way through an underground passage. With additional cost they dug a path for water to travel from the same source of water as the Benson Grist Mill. August of that same year, Maughan dismantled his log home in Tooele City and moved it 11 miles further north near the southern shore of the Great Salt Lake, he was joined by several other families who built their homes with his in a north-south linear arrangement. This would be known as the E.T. City settlement which became the city of Lake Point, Utah.

In October 1854, Maughan was chosen as the Presiding Elder of E.T. City. In March 1855 he was made Captain of the Tooele Military District of the Nauvoo Legion. And in 1856 he was elected to represent Tooele County in the Territory of Utah House of Representatives. These accomplishments came with personal struggles. The entire time Maughan and his family lived in Tooele Valley every settlement had to contend with Goshute tribesmen stealing cattle, often backed by means of violence. And E.T. City experienced two successive years of crop failures in 1855 and 1856, first from crickets and then from sodium carbonate in the soil leaching to the surface from watering.

Upon relaying the poor conditions of the settlement to Brigham Young, Maughan was offered a chance to lead a team of men to Cache Valley to select a new settlement location. On July 21, 1856, they left and selected southern Cache Valley. When they returned to E.T. City in August, Brigham Young formally called Maughan to settle the new location in southern Cache Valley and to take any resident of E.T. City who wished to join them. Some were happy to do so and departed with Maughan.

They arrived at what is now called Wellsville on the September 15, 1856, and began the settlement first called Maughan's Fort. The settlement of Wellsville was soon enlarged, and other communities in the area were founded. Maughan was called as presiding bishop of Cache Valley, overseeing the wards and branches of the valley. In 1860, following directions from Brigham Young, he moved his family to Logan. He served as president of the Cache Valley Stake, as probate judge of Cache County, and as a member of the territorial legislature for Cache County. He also held the rank of colonel in the Nauvoo Legion in Utah.

For a time Maughan served as the regional presiding bishop in Cache County.

Maughan took a third wife, Elizabeth Francis Preator, in the Endowment House on December 8, 1866. They had three children: Frances Mary, Heber Chase, and Ada Lucille. Maughan contracted pneumonia and died on April 24, 1871, at 60 years old. His body was buried in the Logan cemetery.
