= William W. Cluff =

American politician

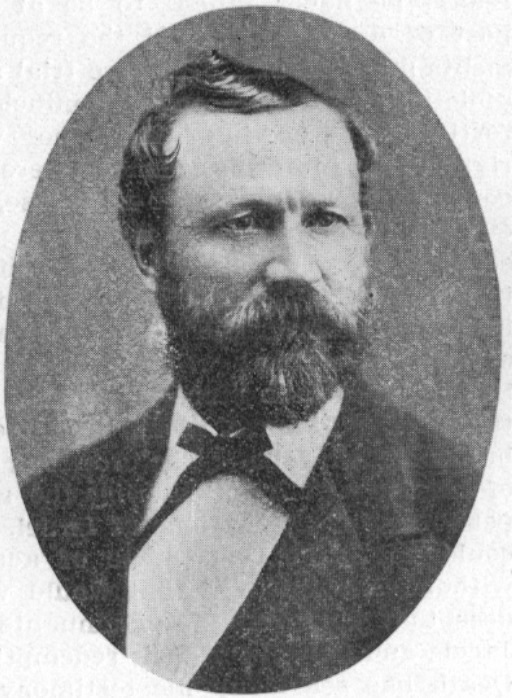
- Born: William Wallace Cluff; March 8, 1832; Willoughby, Lake County, Ohio, US
- Died: August 21, 1915 (aged 83); Salt Lake City, Utah, US
- Spouse: Ann Whipple (1842–1927)
- Children: 5

William Wallace Cluff (March 8, 1832 – August 21, 1915) was an American Latter-day Saint missionary and leader in the 19th century, and a member of the Utah Territorial Legislature.

== Biography ==
Cluff was born in Willoughby, Lake County, Ohio. His parents David Cluff (Clough) and Elizabeth (Betsey) Hall joined The Church of Jesus Christ of Latter-day Saints when Cluff was about one. In 1837, they moved west, intending to go to Missouri, but were delayed by illness and stopped in Springfield, Illinois. In 1840, they moved to Nauvoo to be with the body of the Church and then moved west in 1846.

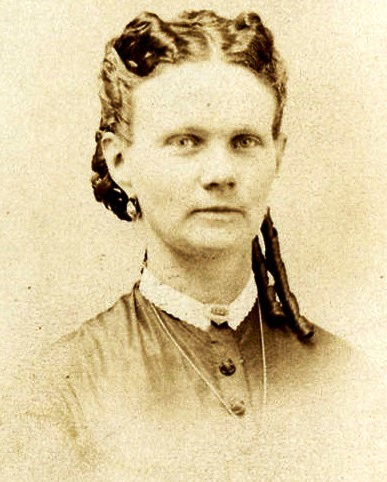
Ann Whipple Cluff

He arrived in Utah in 1850 in a company led by Edward Hunter (Latter-day Saint), and in 1853, he served in the Nauvoo Legion during the Walker War. From 1854 to 1857, Cluff served as a missionary in Hawaii. In the fall of 1857, Cluff left the mission and went to California. There, he was involved in working with lumber mills and met Ann Whipple, whose father, Eli Whipple, ran a lumber mill. Cluff and Ann Whipple married. Her father, also a member of The Church of Jesus Christ of Latter-day Saints, organized a company of nineteen missionaries returning from their fields of labor as well as a few member families and started out from Redwood City, California, for Utah. On reaching Utah, Cluff returned to his home in Provo but was soon sent to Salt Lake City, where he was stationed in the Beehive House—along with John T. Caine, Horace K. Whitney, and James Ferguson—with orders to watch Johnston’s Army as it moved through the city and to burn the place if there were indications the peace plan was not being followed. Cluff then enrolled in the Salt Lake Academy, co-taught by Orson Pratt and James T. Cobb, until he was called on a new mission.

From 1860 to 1863, he served another mission, this time in Denmark, Sweden, and Norway. On October 24, 1863, he married Ann Whipple in Pine Valley, Washington County, Utah.

In 1864, Cluff went to Sandwich Islands (Hawaii) with Lorenzo Snow, Joseph F. Smith, Ezra T. Benson, and Alma T. Smith to respond to messages from Solomona and other local elders that Walter M. Gibson, who had been sent by Brigham Young on a mission to Asia and the Pacific islands, was committing irregularities such as selling the priesthood and establishing a new quorum of apostles. Upon approaching the shore, their boat was capsized, and Lorenzo Snow went under the water. Cluff found and dragged Snow’s body to shore and gave him resuscitation after working with him for several minutes. The companions thought that Apostle Snow had died, but Cluff said, “No, the Lord would not allow him to die being so far away from home,” and Cluff continued blowing air into Snow’s lungs until he rouse from the ground. Cluff and the others were able to reestablish regular order in the Church while in Hawaii. Shortly after this, Cluff was the main force in locating Laie, Hawaii, to be the new gathering place for the Saints in Hawaii. He received a vision while in Laie, confirming it as the right place to set up a settlement.

In 1865, Cluff was called as regional presiding bishop over Morgan County, Utah, Summit County, Utah, and Wasatch County, Utah. From that point on, except for a mission in 1870-1871 to Scandinavia, Cluff resided in Coalville, Utah. During his 1870-1871 mission, he served as president of the Scandinavian Mission. He served in two Utah Constitutional conventions during the 1870s and 1880s (both of which ended up being without effect since Utah was denied statehood) and also six terms in the Utah Territorial Legislature.

From 1877 to 1901, Cluff served as president of the Summitt Stake, which included all of Summit County, Utah.

Cluff was elected to the Utah Territorial House of Representatives in 1865 for the district including Summit County, Utah. He served there until 1870. After being replaced by Orrin S. Lee for one term, he was again in the territorial house for the 1874 term. In the next election in 1876, Cluff was elected to the upper house of the state legislature, known as the Council. He was one of four councilors elected jointly from Salt Lake, Tooelle, and Summit counties. The other three were Wilford Woodruff, Robert T. Burton, and John T. Caine. In 1882, council districts were redrawn, and Summit was put with Wasatch County (centered on Heber City), Uintah County, Utah (the main city in this county is Vernal, Utah) and Morgan County. Cluff was elected as the councilor from this new district. In 1884, Cluff was also made the president of the council. This was Cluff’s last term in the territorial legislature. He was succeeded by Samuel Francis.

William W. Cluff died at his home in Salt Lake City on August 21, 1915.
