= Abram Hatch =

American politician (1830–1911)

Abram Chase Hatch
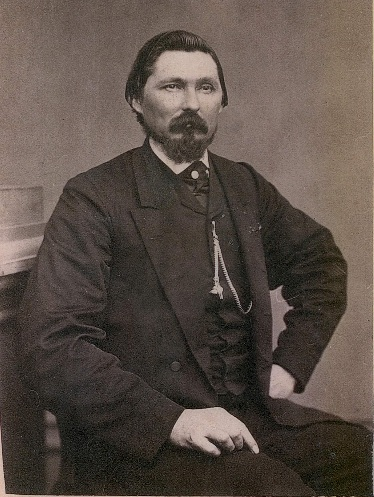
- Born: January 3, 1830; Lincoln, Vermont
- Died: December 3, 1911 (aged 81); Heber City, Utah
- Spouses: Parmelia Jane Lott (m. 1852–1880) Ruth Woolley (m. 1882–1911)

Abram Chase Hatch (January 3, 1830 – December 3, 1911) was an American Mormon pioneer and missionary and was a politician in Utah Territory.

== Biography ==
Hatch settled in Lehi, Utah, where he established himself as a merchant and innkeeper. He often traveled east to obtain merchandise and to help other Mormon pioneers come to Utah. He made a total of 11 trips between the Missouri River and Utah Territory before the transcontinental railroad was completed in 1869.

From 1864 to 1867, Hatch was a missionary for the Church of Jesus Christ of Latter-day Saints (LDS Church) in the United Kingdom. During this time, he was the president of the Manchester and then Birmingham conferences of the LDS Church. Hatch returned home to Utah after touring western Europe in 1867.

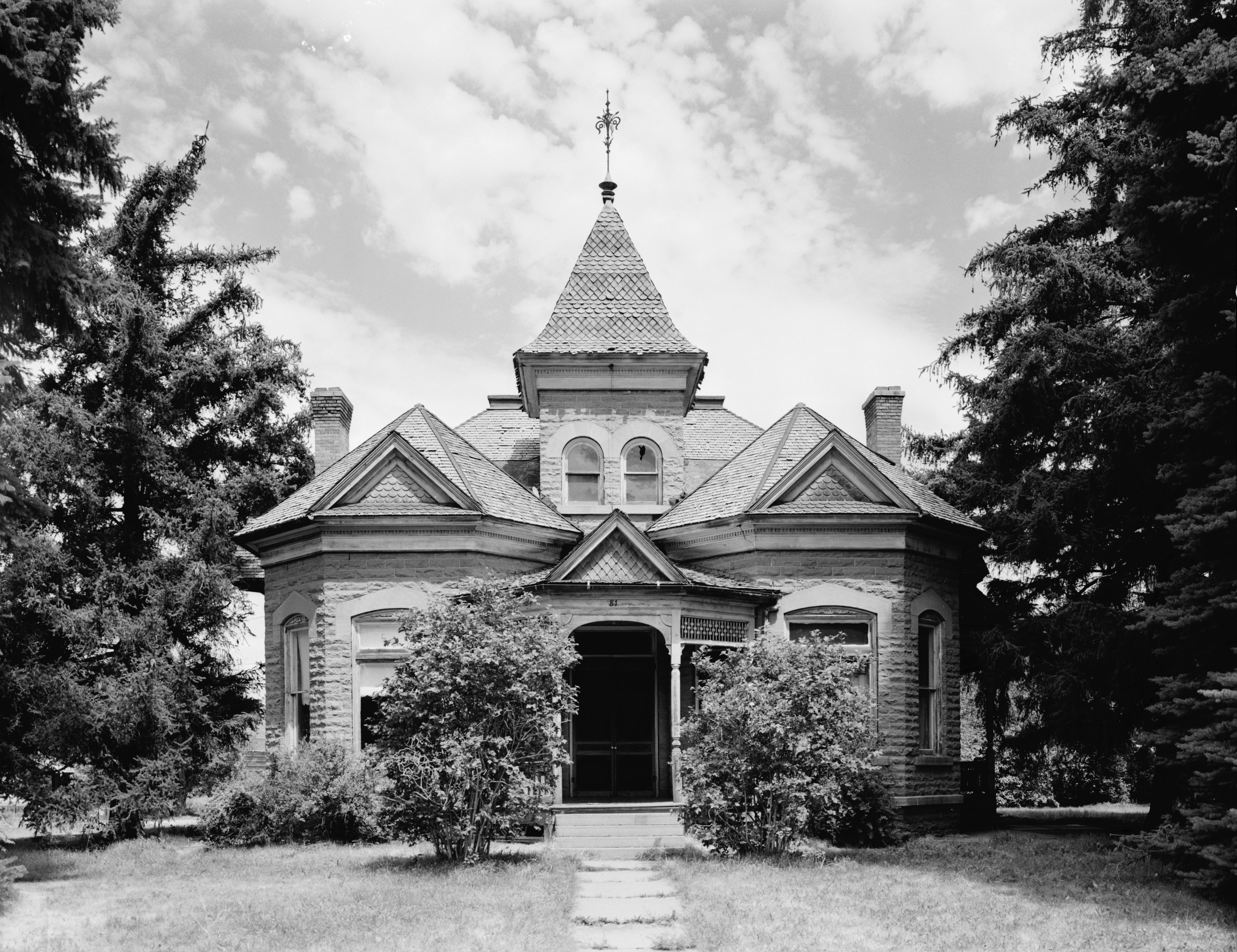
Abram Hatch house in Heber City, Wasatch County, Utah

Upon arriving in Utah, Hatch became the presiding bishop in Wasatch County. When the Wasatch Stake was organized in 1877, Hatch became its first president and would hold this position until 1901. In this capacity, Hatch helped to found many settlements in Wasatch County and elsewhere in Utah: today, along with his brother Jeremiah Hatch, he is recognized as the founder of Vernal, Utah.

Hatch served as probate judge of Wasatch County, the main judicial office in Territorial Utah, especially since it was the highest judicial office that the people and not the outsider federal appointment process chose. Hatch was a member of the Utah Territorial Legislature for 23 years. Hatch was the first representative who proposed that women in Utah be given the vote; the territory granted the vote to women in 1870. The voting rights of women in the territory were abolished by the federal Edmunds–Tucker Act in 1887.

Hatch became a member of the Council of Fifty on June 29, 1883, and was a member until his death.

Hatch was married to Parmelia Jane Lott from 1852 until her death in 1880; the couple had seven children. In 1882, after his first wife's death, Hatch married Ruth Woolley, with whom he had six children, including Vermont Hatch.

Hatch died in Heber City, Utah at age 81. He was buried in Heber City Cemetery.

== Legacy ==
In 1975, Hatch's house in Heber City was added to the National Register of Historic Places listings in Wasatch County, Utah. Hatch's older brother Jeremiah is a great-grandfather of U.S. Senator Orrin Hatch.
