= Utah Territorial Legislative Assembly =

The Legislative Assembly of the Territory of Utah was the legislative branch of government in Utah Territory, replacing the General Assembly of the provisional State of Deseret. The Act of Congress creating the territory in 1850 specified that the territorial legislature should consist of a council of 13 members serving 2-year terms, and a 26-member house of representatives elected for 1-year terms.

In 1869, the Congressional appropriations bill, which also provided for legislative pay and expenses, dictated that all territories should only hold legislative sessions biennially and members would serve 2-year terms. Since the Legislative Assembly was out of session at the time, the Utah general election that year proceeded under the old system, and in its 1870 session the legislature changed the term for members being elected to the House that year to 2 years. Meanwhile, because the Territorial Council members had just been elected to their regular terms, their next election was set for 1871. The end result was that going forward, the House of Representatives would be elected in even-numbered years, and the Territorial Council in odd-numbered years, but legislative sessions were held only in even-numbered years. In conjunction with redistricting in 1880, the election schedule was shifted to have both the House and the Council elected in August of odd-numbered years, in advance of the January legislative session set for the subsequent even-numbered year.

== List of Legislative Assemblies ==
=== Annual sessions (1851-1869) ===
After the first Legislative Assembly, which remained in session much longer in order to establish functional operations of the territorial government, regular annual sessions were scheduled for the second Monday in December and set to run for 40 days. The 16th Legislative Assembly adjusted the start of future sessions to the second Monday in January, so that the legislature elected in 1867 did not begin meeting until 1868. In 1882, the length of the session was extended from 40 days to 60.

On occasion, the flurry of concluding business at the close of the session caused a few legislatures to adjourn a day or two past their scheduled conclusion. For example, on reaching the final scheduled day, the 31st and final Territorial Council remained continuously in session for more than four days (102 hours) so as not to adjourn prematurely without having finished its work. Officially, however, in addition to the 1st, the 2nd and 10th Legislative Assemblies were the only others to require a special session (in the case of the 10th, one held in advance of the regular session rather than after).

- 1st Utah Territorial Legislature: September 22, 1851 — February 18, 1852
- 2nd Utah Territorial Legislature: December 13, 1852 — January 21, 1853
- 3rd Utah Territorial Legislature: December 12, 1853 — January 20, 1854
- 4th Utah Territorial Legislature: December 11, 1854 — January 19, 1855
- 5th Utah Territorial Legislature: December 10, 1855 — January 18, 1856
- 6th Utah Territorial Legislature: December 8, 1856 — January 16, 1857
- 7th Utah Territorial Legislature: December 14, 1857 — January 22, 1858
- 8th Utah Territorial Legislature: December 13, 1858 — January 21, 1859
- 9th Utah Territorial Legislature: December 12, 1859 — January 20, 1860
- 10th Utah Territorial Legislature: December 10, 1860 — January 18, 1861
- 11th Utah Territorial Legislature: December 9, 1861 — January 17, 1862
- 12th Utah Territorial Legislature: December 8, 1862 — January 16, 1863
- 13th Utah Territorial Legislature: December 14, 1863 — January 22, 1864
- 14th Utah Territorial Legislature: December 12, 1864 — January 21, 1865
- 15th Utah Territorial Legislature: December 11, 1865 — January 19, 1866
- 16th Utah Territorial Legislature: December 10, 1866 — January 19, 1867
- 17th Utah Territorial Legislature: January 13 — February 25, 1868
- 18th Utah Territorial Legislature: January 11 — February 19, 1869

=== Biennial sessions (1870-1894) ===
- 19th Utah Territorial Legislature: January 9 — February 19, 1870
- 20th Utah Territorial Legislature: January 8 — February 16, 1872
- 21st Utah Territorial Legislature: January 12 — February 20, 1874
- 22nd Utah Territorial Legislature: January 10 — February 18, 1876
- 23rd Utah Territorial Legislature: January 14 — February 23, 1878
- 24th Utah Territorial Legislature: January 12 — February 21, 1880
- 25th Utah Territorial Legislature: January 9 — March 10, 1882
- 26th Utah Territorial Legislature: January 14 — March 14, 1884
- 27th Utah Territorial Legislature: January 11 — March 12, 1886
- 28th Utah Territorial Legislature: January 9 — March 11, 1888
- 29th Utah Territorial Legislature: January 13 — March 15, 1890
- 30th Utah Territorial Legislature: January 11 — March 12, 1892
- 31st Utah Territorial Legislature: January 8 — March 12, 1894

== Territorial apportionment ==
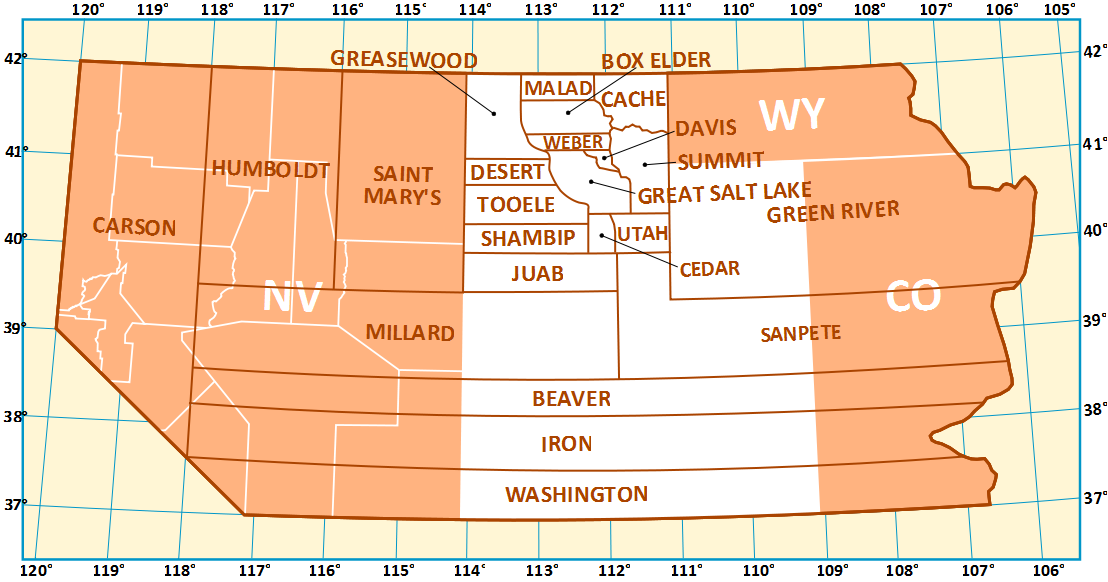
County map of Utah Territory as of 1856. The white background shows the modern-day State of Utah.

Representation in the Legislative Assembly was apportioned by Governor Brigham Young prior to the initial 1851 election by county. The apportionment was comprehensively revised by the legislature in 1862. As more counties were created thereafter, they shared their representation with the county from which they were created (Rich from Cache and Kane from Washington in 1864, Piute from Beaver and Sevier from Sanpete in 1865).

Territorial Council, apportionment by county
County	1851-1863	1863-1880
Beaver	(attached to Millard, 1857)	1 (shared with Iron)
Box Elder	(attached to Weber, 1857)	1 (shared with Weber)
Cache	(attached to Weber, 1857)	1
Carson	0	n/a
Cedar	(attached to Utah, 1857)	n/a
Davis	1	1 (shared with Morgan)
Green River	0	(attached to Salt Lake)
Iron	1	1 (shared with Beaver)
Juab	(attached to Utah, 1852)	1 (shared with Millard)
Malad	(attached to Weber, 1857)	n/a
Millard	1 (beginning 1853)	1 (shared with Juab)
Morgan	n/a	1 (shared with Davis)
Salt Lake	5 (6 in 1851-1852)	4
Sanpete	1	1
Shambip	(attached to Salt Lake, 1857)	n/a
Summit	0	(attached to Salt Lake)
Tooele	(attached to Salt Lake)	(attached to Salt Lake)
Utah	2	2 (shared with Wasatch)
Wasatch	n/a	2 (shared with Utah)
Washington	(attached to Iron, 1857)	1
Weber	2	1 (shared with Box Elder)

House of Representatives, apportionment by county
County	1851-1856	1856-1859	1859-1862	1862-1880
Beaver	n/a	(attached to Millard)	1	1
Box Elder	n/a	1 (shared with Cache and Malad)	1 (shared with Cache and Malad)	1
Cache	n/a	1 (shared with Box Elder and Malad)	1 (shared with Box Elder and Malad)	2
Carson	1 (beginning 1855)	1	1	n/a
Cedar	n/a	(attached to Utah)	(attached to Utah)	n/a
Davis	2 (3 in 1851)	2	2	2 (shared with Morgan)
Green River	1 (beginning 1854)	1	1	1 (shared with Summit)
Iron	2	2	2	1
Juab	1 (beginning 1852)	1	1	1
Malad	n/a	1 (shared with Box Elder and Cache)	1 (shared with Box Elder and Cache)	n/a
Millard	1 (beginning 1852)	1	1	1
Morgan	n/a	n/a	n/a	2 (shared with Davis)
Salt Lake	11 (13 in 1851, 12 in 1852-1853)	11	9	6
Sanpete	1	1	1	2
Shambip	n/a	(attached to Tooele)	(attached to Tooele)	n/a
Summit	0	0	0	1 (shared with Green River)
Tooele	1	1	1	1
Utah	3	3	3	3
Wasatch	n/a	n/a	n/a	1
Washington	n/a	(attached to Iron)	(attached to Iron)	1
Weber	2 (3 in 1851-1854)	1	2	2

Congress reduced the number of legislators in 1880 to 12 on the Territorial Council and 24 in the House of Representatives. Together with the creation of Emery, San Juan, and Uintah counties, this forced the Legislative Assembly to devise a new redistricting scheme.

Legislative Assembly apportionment, 1880-1887 (combined cells indicate shared representation)
Counties	Territorial Council	House of Representatives
Cache and Rich	1	2
Box Elder	1	1
Weber	1	2
Wasatch and Uintah	1	1
Summit	1	1
Morgan	1	6
Salt Lake and Davis	4	6
Tooele	4	1
Juab and Utah	2	4
Sanpete, Sevier, and Emery	1	2
Beaver and Piute	1	1
Millard	1	1
Washington and Kane	1	1
Iron and San Juan	1	1

Beginning in 1888, legislators were elected from geographic districts instead of by county after the Edmunds-Tucker Act nullified previous apportionments and again required redistricting of the entire territory. The final district boundaries were set in 1891 by the Utah Commission, which had been established under the earlier Edmunds Act of 1882 to oversee elections in the territory.

Legislative districts, 1891
Council district	House district	Geographical area	House seats	Council seats
1	1	Cache and Rich counties	2	1
2	3	City of Ogden	2	1
3	2	Box Elder county	1	1
3	4	Weber county (excluding Ogden)	1	1
4	5	Salt Lake City	6	3
5	6	Davis and Morgan counties, northwest precincts of Salt Lake county	1	1
5	9	Bingham; Tooele county; Juab county (excluding Mona)	1	1
6	7	Southern Salt Lake county and northern Utah county	1	1
6	11	Provo, Provo Bench, Lake Shore, Lakeview, Springville	1	1
7	8	Eastern Salt Lake county	1	1
7	10	Summit and Uintah counties	1	1
8	12	Mona; southern Utah county; northern Sanpete county	1	1
8	13	Southern Sanpete county	1	1
9	14	Wasatch, Emery, and Grand counties	1	1
9	15	Sevier and Millard counties	1	1
10	16	Beaver, Piute, and Iron counties	1	1
10	17	Garfield, Washington, Kane, and San Juan counties	1	1

== See also ==
- History of Utah
- List of governors of Utah
- List of Utah state legislatures
