= Silas S. Smith =

American politician

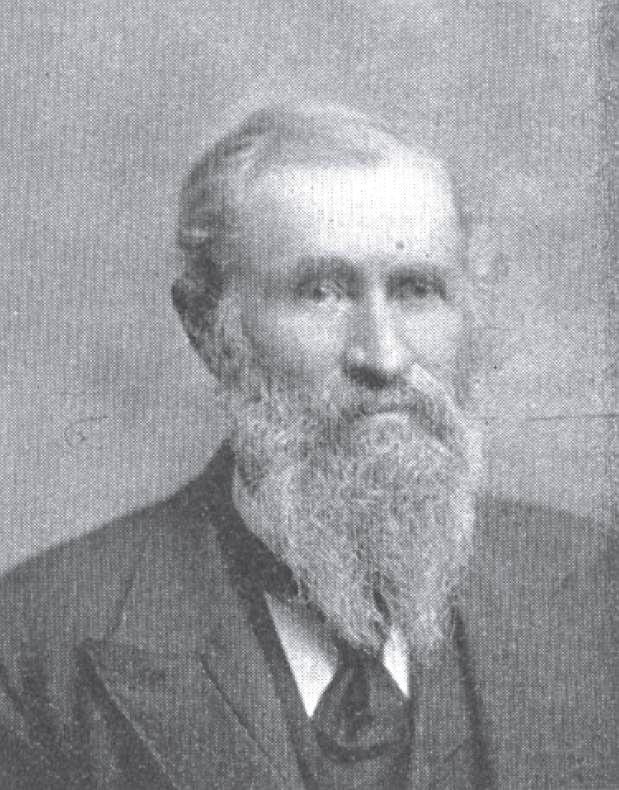

Silas Sanford Smith (October 26, 1830 – October 11, 1910) was a Mormon pioneer, a politician in the Utah Territory, and the leader of the San Juan Expedition that settled San Juan County, Utah.

Smith was born in Stockholm, New York. His father, Silas Sr., was a younger brother of Joseph Smith Sr., which made Silas Jr. and Joseph Smith Jr. first cousins. Silas Sr. was baptized into Smith's Church of the Latter Day Saints in 1835 and the family became followers of Smith. After Silas Sr.'s baptism, the family moved to Kirtland, Ohio. A few years later they joined the Mormon settlers in Missouri and in 1839 they were driven out and settled in Nauvoo, Illinois. In 1847, after Joseph Smith was killed, the family left Nauvoo and crossed the American plains as Mormon pioneers, settling in the Salt Lake Valley.

In Utah Territory, Silas Jr. lived first in Salt Lake City and then in Farmington. In 1851, he married Clarinda Ricks, with whom he had four children. Shortly after their marriage, Brigham Young asked the couple to settle in Parowan. Smith practiced plural marriage and in 1853 married Sarah Ann Ricks, his first wife's sister. Smith and Sarah Ricks had five children. In 1854 to 1856, Smith was a missionary for the Church of Jesus Christ of Latter-day Saints (LDS Church) in Hawaii, where he learned to speak the Hawaiian language.

After he returned from Hawaii, Smith and his wives and children moved to Paragonah, Utah. Smith was a military leader in the Black Hawk War.

In 1859, Smith was elected as a representative in the Utah Territorial Legislature, where he served until 1878. Smith was also a deputy U.S. Marshal, a probate judge, and a bishop of the LDS Church in Paragonah. After the death of both of his wives within months of each other, Smith married Martha Eliza Bennet in 1864. Smith and Bennet had 12 children together.

In 1879, Smith was asked by the LDS Church to become the president of the San Juan Mission of the church in southern Utah. In this capacity, he was asked to locate a suitable spot for a Mormon settlement on the San Juan River. Smith led the San Juan Expedition via the Hole in the Rock Trail, establishing the settlement of Bluff. Smith remained president of the San Juan Mission until 1882. In April 1880, Smith became a member of the LDS Church's Council of Fifty.

After his term as president of the San Juan Mission, the LDS Church asked Smith to move to Colorado. From 1883 to 1892, he was the president of the San Luis Stake in Conejos, Colorado. He lived in Colorado until 1900, when he moved to Layton, Utah. Smith died in Layton of heart troubles.

Smith was the father of a total of 21 children with three wives.
