= Albert P. Rockwood =

American politician

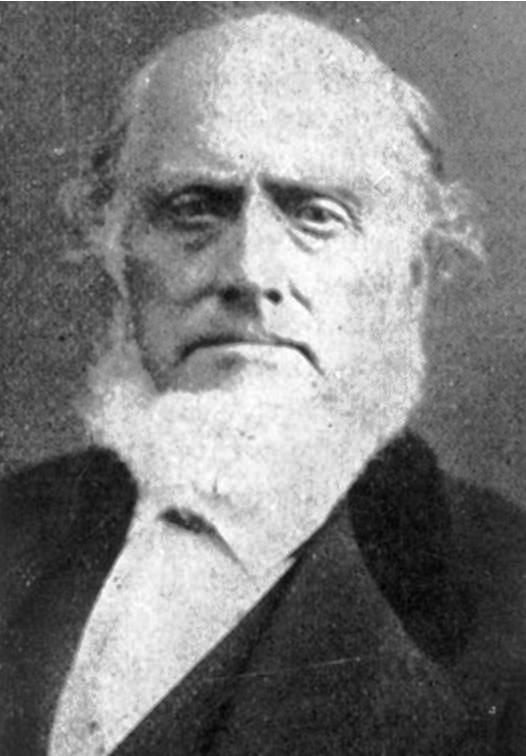

First Seven Presidents of the Seventy
- December 2, 1845 – November 25, 1879
- Called by: Brigham Young

Personal details
- Born: Albert Perry Rockwood; June 5, 1805; Holliston, Massachusetts, United States
- Died: November 25, 1879 (aged 74); Sugar House, Utah Territory, United States
- Resting place: Salt Lake City Cemetery; 40.777°N 111.858°W
- Spouse(s): Nancy Ruth Haven; Elvira Teeples; Angelina Horn (Orn); Julianne Sophie Olsen; Susannah Cornwall
- Children: 22
- Parents: Luther Rockwood; Ruth Perry

Albert Perry Rockwood (June 5, 1805 – November 25, 1879) was an early Latter Day Saint leader and member of the First Seven Presidents of the Seventy of the Church of Jesus Christ of Latter-day Saints.

== Life ==
Rockwood was born in Holliston, Massachusetts to Luther Rockwood and Ruth Perry, Rockwood. He married Nancy Ruth Haven on April 4, 1827. His interests were temperance, anti-slavery, military tactics and medicine. His wife Nancy Haven was a first cousin to Brigham Young and Willard Richards. In 1836, Brigham Young and Joseph Young stayed at the Rockwood home in Holliston, Mass. (still standing) and left a copy of the Book of Mormon with Albert, who went by "AP," and Nancy.

== Conversion ==
Soon after Brigham and Joseph's departure, Nancy's cousin Willard Richards came to stay with AP and Nancy. The conversion of cousins Brigham and Joseph Young to the fledgling Church of Jesus Christ of Latter-Day Saints created a stir and the family gathered at the Rockwood home to discuss this development. Many in the family thought that Brigham and Joseph had gone mad and left behind a copy of the "Devil's Bible."

Willard Richards proclaimed that he did not know whether the Book of Mormon was from God or the Devil but he intended to read it to find out for himself. He read the book from cover to cover while staying in the Rockwood home and became convinced that the book was from God.

In 1837, Willard Richards and Brigham Young visited AP and Nancy and encouraged them to convert to the "restored gospel". In 1837, AP traveled to Kirtland, Ohio, at the invitation of Brigham Young in order to meet Joseph Smith firsthand. Despite hearing many slanders that were circulating about Joseph Smith in Kirtland at the time, AP was convinced that Joseph was a true prophet. Brigham Young baptized him in Kirtland on July 25, 1837.

Notwithstanding AP came from a leading family in the Holliston, Massachusetts, area, his conversion to Mormonism brought persecution upon him. Wilford Woodruff reported visiting AP in jail after charges were brought against him due to anti-Mormon prejudice.

== Far west ==
AP and Nancy traveled to Far West, Mo. to join with the "Saints". They had to stay quiet about being Mormons to avoid harassment on the way. In Missouri, AP was a member of the "Danite" organization and participated in the Mormon militia that attempted to defend the saints against mob attacks on their settlements. He wrote letters home to Holliston describing events in and around Far West that to this date are some of the most reliable historical sources about the nature of the Mormon Danites and the Missouri mob activities of the time.

== Illinois ==
When the Mormons were expelled from Missouri during the winter under the extermination order issued against them by Missouri Gov. Lilburn Boggs, AP and Nancy moved to Quincy, Illinois, in January 1839 and to Nauvoo by 1841. He was appointed a drill officer for he Nauvoo Legion on March 9, 1841, and was the commander of Joseph Smith's bodyguards.

AP Rockwood was trusted by Joseph Smith and there are a few surviving stories of AP trying to protect Smith. On one occasion AP received intelligence that an enemy of Smith by the name of John C. Bennett was going to attempt an assassination of the prophet during a drill exercise of the Nauvoo Legion. AP ordered the prophet's body guard to surround him during the entire exercise and the plan was thwarted.

On another occasion, a sheriff from the state of Missouri crossed the Mississippi River into Illinois and kidnapped Joseph Smith in an attempt to return him to Missouri to face charges. AP led a posse that attempted to recover Smith.

During the last days of Joseph Smith's life, Rockwood was one of a select group of trusted brothers who was helping to hide the prophet on an island in the Mississippi River from the mobs that were seeking his life.

== Nauvoo ==
After the mob murder of Joseph Smith, Rockwood remained in Nauvoo where he was put in charge of quarrying the stone used to build the Nauvoo Temple. It was a dangerous occupation and wives of some of the men working in the quarry complained to Brigham Young. Rockwood accepted responsibility to care for the family of any man killed in the quarry. He followed through with his promise by taking two women into polygamous marriages after their husbands were killed in the quarry—Angelina Horn and Elvira Teeples Wheeler whose husband Henry Wheeler was killed in the quarry.

Having been ordained a seventy by Joseph Young January 5, 1839, Young was set apart as one of the presidents of the Seventy on December 2, 1845.

== Omaha ==
When Illinois mobs drove the Mormons from Nauvoo, AP Rockwood and his wives and children made the trek from Nauvoo to Winter Quarters near present-day Omaha, Nebraska. By virtue of his ecclesiastical position and his relationship to Brigham Young, he served as a leader at Winter Quarters.

When Brigham Young formed the first "pioneer company" to build and map the trail to be followed by Mormon refugees from Winter Quarters to the Valley of the Great Salt Lake, the advance group was divided up into three companies of "100s". AP Rockwood was appointed as one of the three captains of 100 who led the first Mormon Pioneer company West.

== Salt Lake valley ==
Rockwood was part of the first group of Mormon pioneers to arrive in the Salt Lake Valley in July 1847. In the party, a few were afflicted with Rocky Mountain spotted fever, including Brigham Young and Rockwood. In order to make them more comfortable, Wilford Woodruff had the two ride in his carriage for the last few days of the journey. Rockwood was in the wagon with Young when Young reportedly made his famous proclamation about the Salt Lake Valley, "This is the right place".

As soon as AP was well enough to ride his horse, he was sent by Brigham Young on a mission to collect tithing from the saints on the East coast to help out the financially destitute church. After fulfilling this mission, AP returned to Winter Quarters where, in 1850, he traveled with his wives and children back out to the Valley of the Great Salt Lake.

== Road supervisor ==
In Great Salt Lake City, he was appointed Supervisor of Roads. In his continuing capacity as a General in the Nauvoo Legion, he was involved in the resistance to the U.S. Army sent out to the Valley of the Great Salt Lake to quell the "Mormon Rebellion."

== Utah legislature ==
From 1851 to 1879, Rockwood served in the Utah territorial legislature. He was one of the first wardens of the Territorial Prison where he served until the prison was taken over by the federal government after its crackdown on polygamy in the Utah Territory. He is remembered for his enlightened views and humane treatment of the prison inmates in his care. He was the first game warden in the state of Utah, earning that distinction because he used prisoners in a project to raise game fish.

== Marriage ==
Rockwood practiced plural marriage and fathered 22 children. He died in Sugar House, Utah Territory, at his home on Elizabeth Street at approximately 1200 East and 2500 in Salt Lake City, Utah (no longer standing), where he was surrounded by his family and friends.

Rookwood's name is listed as one of the original pioneers on Cyrus Dallin's Brigham Young Monument in Temple Square.
