= Nauvoo Legion (disambiguation) =

The Nauvoo Legion is the militia for the city of Nauvoo, Illinois.

Nauvoo Legion may also refer to:

- The Utah Territorial Militia, also called the "Nauvoo Legion"
- The Militia of the State of Deseret and early saints after they went west
