= Daniel H. Wells =

American religious leader and politician (1814-1891)

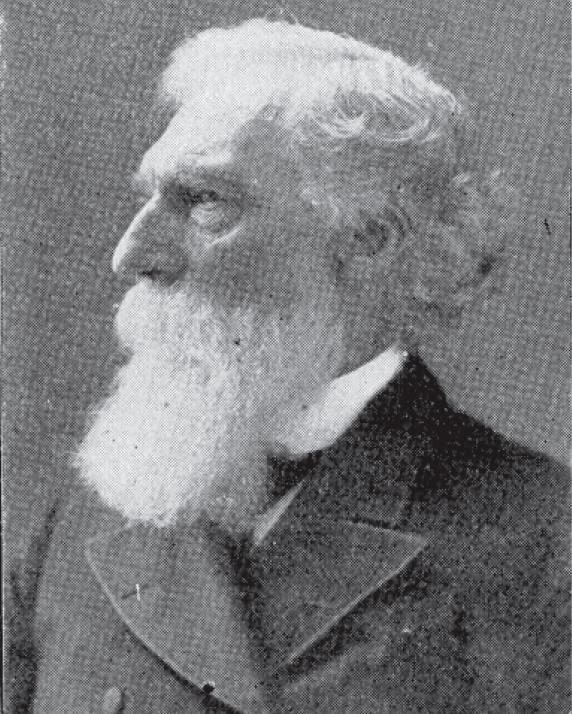

Counselor to the Quorum of the Twelve Apostles
- In office October 6, 1877 – March 24, 1891
- President: John Taylor

Second Counselor in First Presidency
- In office January 4, 1857 – August 29, 1877
- President: Brigham Young

Apostle
- In office January 4, 1857 – March 24, 1891
- President: Brigham Young

3rd Mayor of Salt Lake City
- In office 1866–1876

Personal details
- Born: Daniel Hanmer Wells; October 27, 1814 Trenton, New York, United States
- Died: March 24, 1891 (aged 76) Salt Lake City, Utah Territory, United States
- Resting place: Salt Lake City Cemetery; 40.777°N 111.858°W
- Party: People's Party of Utah
- Spouse(s): Hannah Tupper Grover; Lydia A. Alley; Hannah C. Free; Susan H. Alley; Louisa Free; Martha G. Harris; Emmeline Blanche
- Children: At least 37
- Parent(s): Daniel Wells; Catherine Chapin
- Relatives: US Ambassador Cavendish W. Cannon (Grandson)

Military service
- Allegiance: United States
- Branch/service: Territorial Militia
- Rank: Lieutenant General
- Unit: Nauvoo Legion
- Commands: Nauvoo Legion
- Battles/wars: Utah War; American Civil War; Morrisite War; Battle at Fort Utah

Daniel Hanmer Wells (October 27, 1814 – March 24, 1891) was an American religious leader and politician. He was an apostle of the Church of Jesus Christ of Latter-day Saints (LDS Church) and the 3rd mayor of Salt Lake City.

== Biography ==
=== Early life ===
Wells was born in Trenton, New York, a member of the sixth generation of his family in America. His original immigrant ancestor was Thomas Welles (1594–1660), who arrived in Massachusetts in 1635 and was the only man in Connecticut's history to hold all four top offices: governor, deputy governor, treasurer, and secretary. Wells was also a descendant of John Webster, fifth Governor of Connecticut. A few years after the death of his father in 1826, Daniel H. Wells left New York with his mother Catherine Chapin Wells and his younger sister Catherine C. Wells and moved to Illinois.

Wells arrived in Hancock County, Illinois, in 1835. He lived in Commerce, Illinois—later renamed Nauvoo—and was a major landowner and justice of the peace there for several years prior to the arrival of large numbers of Latter Day Saints in 1839.

=== Relationship with the Latter-day Saints ===
Although not initially a member of the Latter-day Saints, opponents of the church classified Wells was as a "Jack Mormon", a term originally applied to non-members who were friendly to or defended the Latter Day Saints. In Nauvoo, he served on the city council and as a judge.

Mobs invaded Nauvoo after the assassination of church founder Joseph Smith; Wells defended the city and fought as a Lieutenant General of the Nauvoo Legion, and also provided shelter for evacuees. Wells was not baptized into the LDS Church until August 9, 1846. He emigrated to the Salt Lake Valley with the Mormon pioneers in 1848.

He was elected Attorney General of State of Deseret in 1849. When Jedediah M. Grant died in 1856, Wells was ordained an apostle of the LDS Church and set apart as Second Counselor to Brigham Young in the First Presidency of the church. Although serving as an apostle, Wells was never sustained as a member of the Quorum of Twelve Apostles. Upon Young's death in 1877, Wells was sustained as a Counselor to the Quorum of the Twelve Apostles, a position he held until his death.

On behalf of Brigham Young, Wells dedicated the St. George Temple on April 6, 1877. From 1888 to 1891, he was the first president of the Manti Utah Temple.

From 1848 until 1863, Wells was superintendent of public works for the LDS Church and presided over the continuing construction of the Salt Lake Temple (completed 1893) and the Salt Lake Tabernacle (completed 1867). When Wells was no longer in the position, the operation of the church's public works program was placed under the supervision of the Presiding Bishopric.

In 1866, Wells was elected mayor of Salt Lake City as a member of the newly formed People's Party; he was re-elected in both 1872 and 1874. In 1871, he was arrested by U.S. marshals on charges related to polygamy. Wells served twice as president of the European Mission of the LDS Church, first in 1864–65 and again in 1884–87.

=== Extermination order against Timpanogos ===
On January 31, 1850, Wells drafted orders for Captain George D. Grant to exterminate the Timpanogos, known as Special Order No. 2. The decision was the result of a meeting with Isaac Higbee, bishop of Fort Utah, together with the First Presidency and the Quorum of the Twelve Apostles. Higbee reported conflict between the pioneers and the Timpanogos, and it was unanimously decided the only way to keep Fort Utah would be to exterminate the Timpanogos.

The initial detachment commenced battle on February 8, 1850, under Captain Grant. However, after hearing reports of poor attitude of the settlers in working with Grants's troops, Brigham Young asked Wells to lead a detachment. On February 11, Wells arrived and split the army into two. One contingent followed the trail of some Timpanogos who had fled up Rock Canyon. Wells led the other contingent south towards Spanish Fork river. He divided them into smaller parties and searched the southern valley for native peoples to kill. On February 14, at Table Rock near the southeastern shore of Utah lake, one of the smaller hunting parties captured a band of Utes. Lieutenant Gunnison of the Stansbury Expedition reported that the Mormons promised to be friendly to the Timpanogos men, but then lined up the men to be executed in front of their families. Some attempted to flee across the frozen lake, but the Mormons ran after them on horseback and shot them. At least eleven Ute men were killed. In total, one militia man and an estimated 102 Timpanogos were killed.

=== Civil War ===
Wells worked with Brigham Young to form the Lot Smith Cavalry Company. Wells also commanded the Utah Territorial Militia during the American Civil War and the Morrisite War .

== Personal life ==
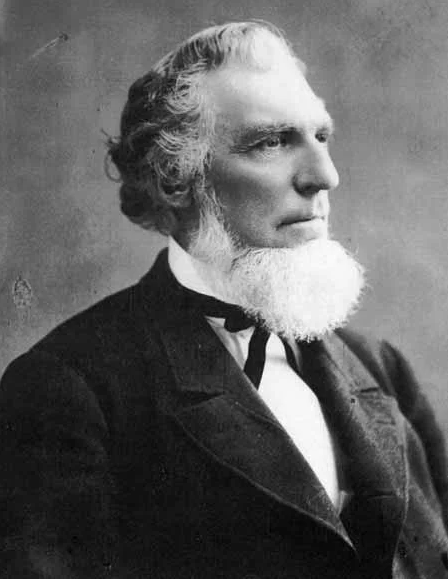
Daniel H. Wells portrait.

Wells married Eliza Rebecca Robison in 1837 and with her had one son, Albert Emory Wells. His wife refused to accompany Wells to Utah in 1848 and later divorced him. Between 1849 and 1852, Wells married six additional wives: Louisa Free, with whom he had eight children; Martha Givens Harris, with whom he had seven children; Lydia Ann Alley, with whom he had six children; Susan Hannah Alley, with whom he had four children; Hannah Corilla Free, with whom he had eight children; and Emmeline Blanche Woodward, with whom he had three children. Louisa Free, Hannah Free, and Emmeline Woodward were all previously married and divorced or widowed. Each had one or more children whom Wells adopted and reared as his own.

In 1852, Wells married his seventh wife, future Relief Society General President Emmeline B. Wells. They had three daughters.

Marriages and Children:

Eliza Rebecca Robison

Louisa Free

Martha G. Harris

Lydia Ann Alley

Susan H. Alley

Hannah C. Free

Emmaline B. Woodward
- March 12, 1837, in Nauvoo, Illinois to Eliza Rebecca Robison (January 4, 1820, in Cincinnati, OH – August 2, 1905, in Alma, MI); divorced May 1848
1. Albert Emory Wells (March 28, 1839, in Nauvoo, IL – January 26, 1916, in Belding, MI)
2. John Brigham Wells (February 25, 1846, in Nauvoo, IL – February 25, 1846, in Nauvoo, IL)
- February 15, 1849, in Salt Lake City, Utah, to Louisa Free (August 9, 1824, in Fayetteville, IL – June 18, 1886, in Salt Lake City, UT)
1. Daniel Hanmer Wells Jr. (November 24, 1849, in Salt Lake City, UT – September 19, 1926, in Salt Lake City, UT)
2. Frances Louisa Wells (March 13, 1852, in Salt Lake City, UT – March 5, 1944, in Salt Lake City, UT)
3. Rulon Seymour Wells (July 7, 1854, in Salt Lake City, UT – May 7, 1941, in Salt Lake City, UT)
4. Emeline Young Wells (April 13, 1857, in Salt Lake City, UT – March 17, 1941, in Salt Lake City, UT)
5. Eliza Free Lyde Wells (October 3, 1859, in Salt Lake City, UT – December 2, 1940, in Salt Lake City, UT)
6. Clara Ellen Wells (October 23, 1862, in Salt Lake City, UT – April 30, 1946, in Salt Lake City, UT)
7. Melvin Dickinson Wells (July 31, 1867, in Salt Lake City, UT – September 11, 1941, in Salt Lake City, UT)
- September 20, 1849, in Salt Lake City, Utah, to Martha Givens Harris (March 27, 1832, in Lebanon, TN – May 12, 1908, in Salt Lake City, UT)
1. Emily Harris Wells (April 22, 1857, in Salt Lake City, UT – May 25, 1908, in Salt Lake City, UT)
2. Heber Manning Wells (August 11, 1859, in Salt Lake City, UT – March 12, 1938, in Salt Lake City, UT)
3. Joseph Smith Wells (May 25, 1862, in Salt Lake City, UT – October 18, 1916, in Salt Lake City, UT)
4. Herman Chapman Wells (February 13, 1867, in Salt Lake City, UT – September 8, 1868, in Salt Lake City, UT)
5. Edna Margaret Wells (July 5, 1869, in Salt Lake City, UT – July 5, 1935, in Salt Lake City, UT)
6. Briant Harris Wells (December 5, 1871, in Salt Lake City, UT – June 10, 1949, in Long Beach, CA)
- April 4, 1852, in Salt Lake City, Utah, to Lydia Ann Alley (January 1, 1828, in Lynn, MA – August 6, 1909, in Salt Lake City, UT)
1. Catherine Alley Wells (March 28, 1853, in Salt Lake City, UT – November 10, 1922, in Salt Lake City, UT)
2. Mary Minerva Wells (December 10, 1854, in Salt Lake City, UT – January 25, 1935, in Salt Lake City, UT)
3. Lucy Ann Wells (December 4, 1858, in Salt Lake City, UT – October 23, 1859, in Salt Lake City, UT)
4. Louis Robinson Wells (December 21, 1862, in Salt Lake City, UT – November 23, 1952, in Salt Lake City, UT)
5. Wilford Woodruff Wells (June 21, 1868, in Salt Lake City, UT – October 10, 1868, in Salt Lake City, UT)
6. Arthur Deming Wells (September 1, 1871, in Salt Lake City, UT – December 1, 1871, in Salt Lake City, UT)
- April 18, 1852, in Salt Lake City, Utah, to Susan Hannah Alley (May 3, 1830, in Lynn, MA – May 5, 1924, in Salt Lake City, UT; sister of Lydia above)
1. Susan Annette Wells (November 28, 1857, in Salt Lake City, UT – November 21, 1929, in Salt Lake City, UT)
2. George Alley Wells (December 18, 1859, in Salt Lake City, UT – July 24, 1872, in Salt Lake City, UT)
3. Stephen Franklin Wells (June 25, 1867, in Salt Lake City, UT – July 23, 1958)
4. Charles Henry Wells (August 28, 1870, in Salt Lake City, UT – December 31, 1944, in Salt Lake City, UT)
- August 6, 1852, in Salt Lake City, Utah, to Hannah Corilla Free (June 9, 1829, in Belleville, IL – March 6, 1913, in Salt Lake City, UT; sister of Louisa above)
1. Abbie Corilla Wells (September 20, 1852, in Salt Lake City, UT – September 25, 1930, in Salt Lake City, UT)
2. Junius Free Wells (June 1, 1854, in Salt Lake City, UT – April 15, 1930, in Salt Lake City, UT)
3. Luna Pamela Wells (August 24, 1856, in Salt Lake City, UT – November 4, 1857, in Salt Lake City, UT)
4. Brigham Wells (April 14, 1859, in Salt Lake City, UT – October 26, 1863, in Salt Lake City, UT)
5. Preston Strait Wells (May 11, 1861, in Salt Lake City, UT – June 4, 1861, in Salt Lake City, UT)
6. Ephraim Willard Wells (September 17, 1863, in Salt Lake City, UT – October 18, 1863, in Salt Lake City, UT)
7. Gershom Britain Finley Wells (November 19, 1864, in Lancashire, England – May 21, 1944, in Salt Lake City, UT)
8. Victor Pennington Wells (May 18, 1868, in Salt Lake City, UT – January 3, 1927, in Lancaster, PA)
- October 18, 1852, in Salt Lake City, Utah, to Emmeline Blanche Woodward (February 29, 1828, in Petersham, MA – April 25, 1921, in Salt Lake City, UT)
1. Emma Whitney Wells (September 10, 1853, in Salt Lake City, UT – April 8, 1878, in Salt Lake City, UT)
2. Elizabeth Ann "Annie" Wells (December 7, 1859, in Salt Lake City, UT – September 2, 1942, in Salt Lake City, UT)
3. Louisa Martha "Louie" Wells (August 27, 1862, in Salt Lake City, UT – May 16, 1887, in Salt Lake City, UT)
- November 14, 1871, in Salt Lake City, Utah, to Hannah Tupper (March 23, 1823, in Parishville, NY – December 15, 1893, in Loa, UT)

Wells died in Salt Lake City at the age of 76 and was buried at Salt Lake City Cemetery. Wells's son by his wife Martha G. Harris, Heber Manning Wells, was the first governor of the state of Utah, serving from 1896 to 1905.

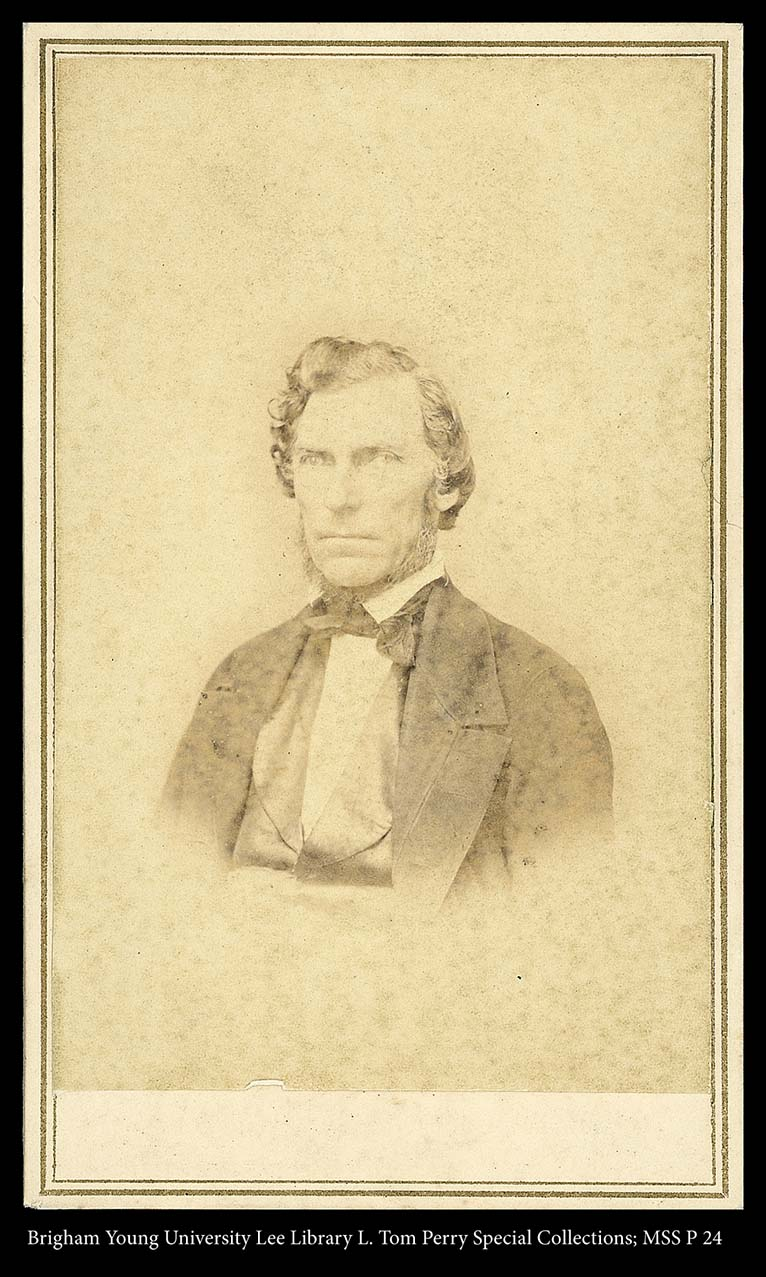
Wells around 1862

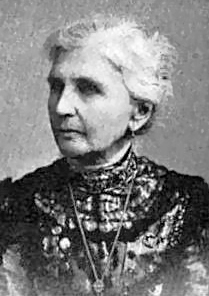
Wife Emmeline B. Wells

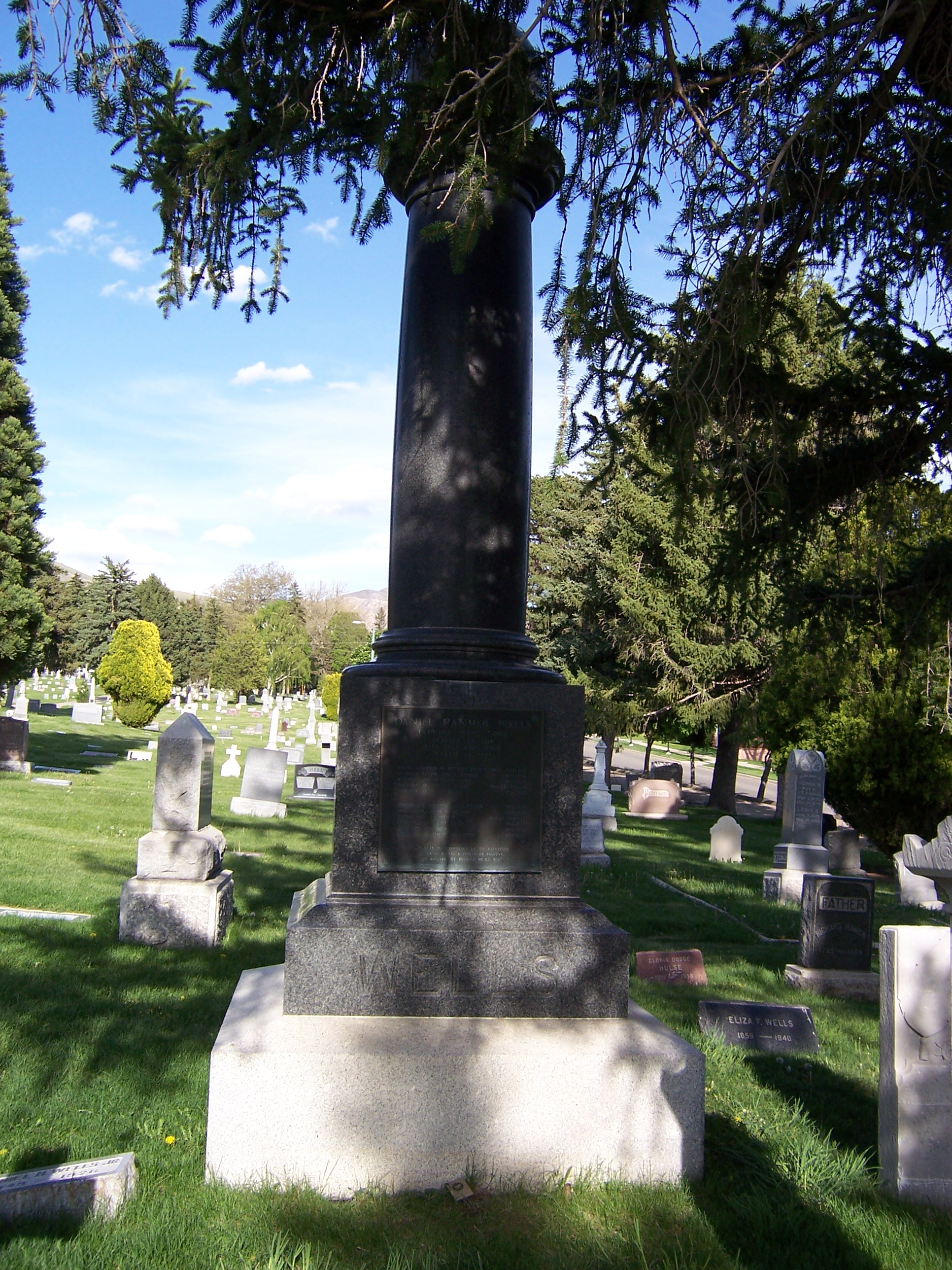
Daniel H. Wells's grave marker

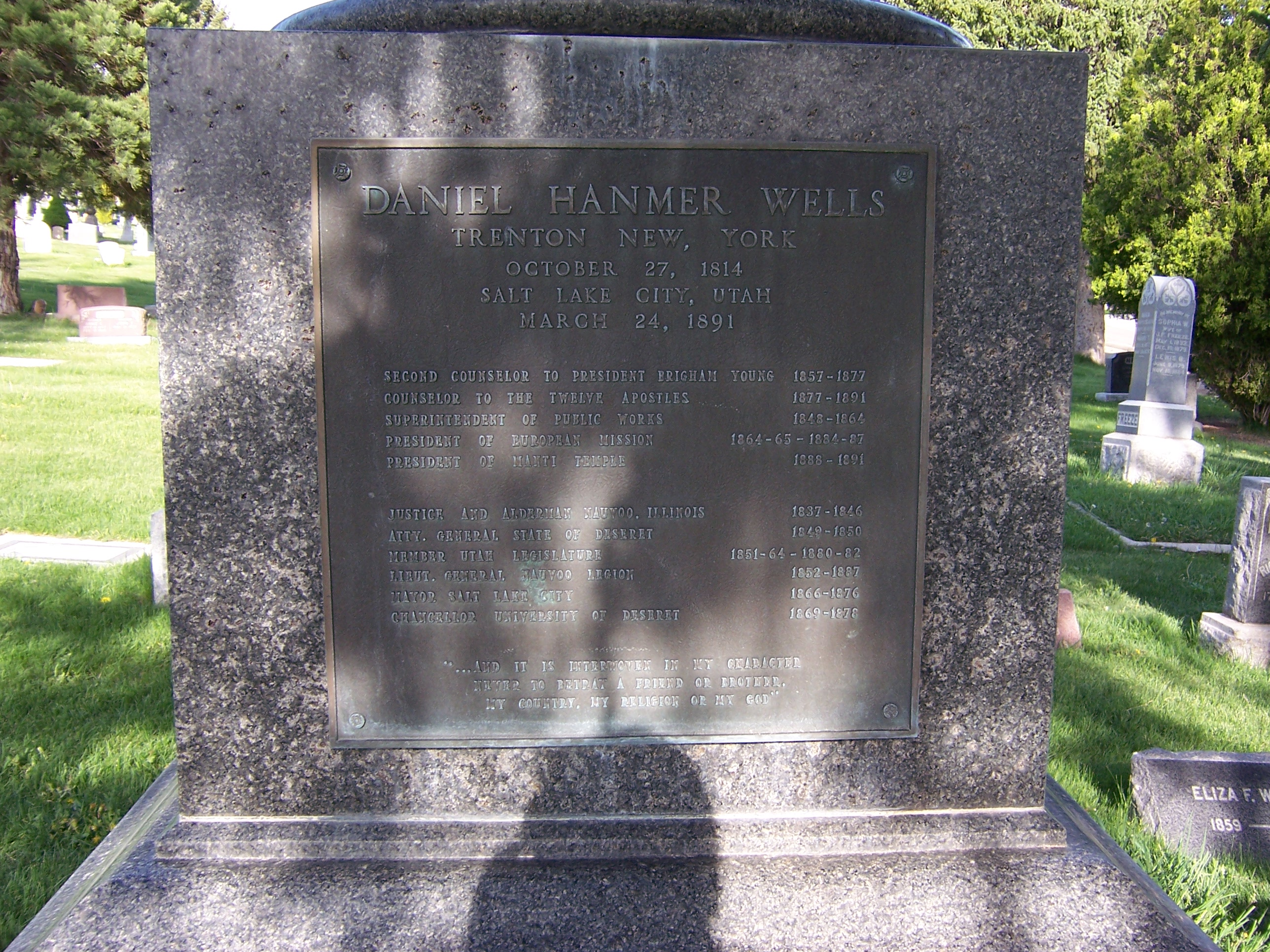
Detail from plaque of Daniel H. Wells's grave marker

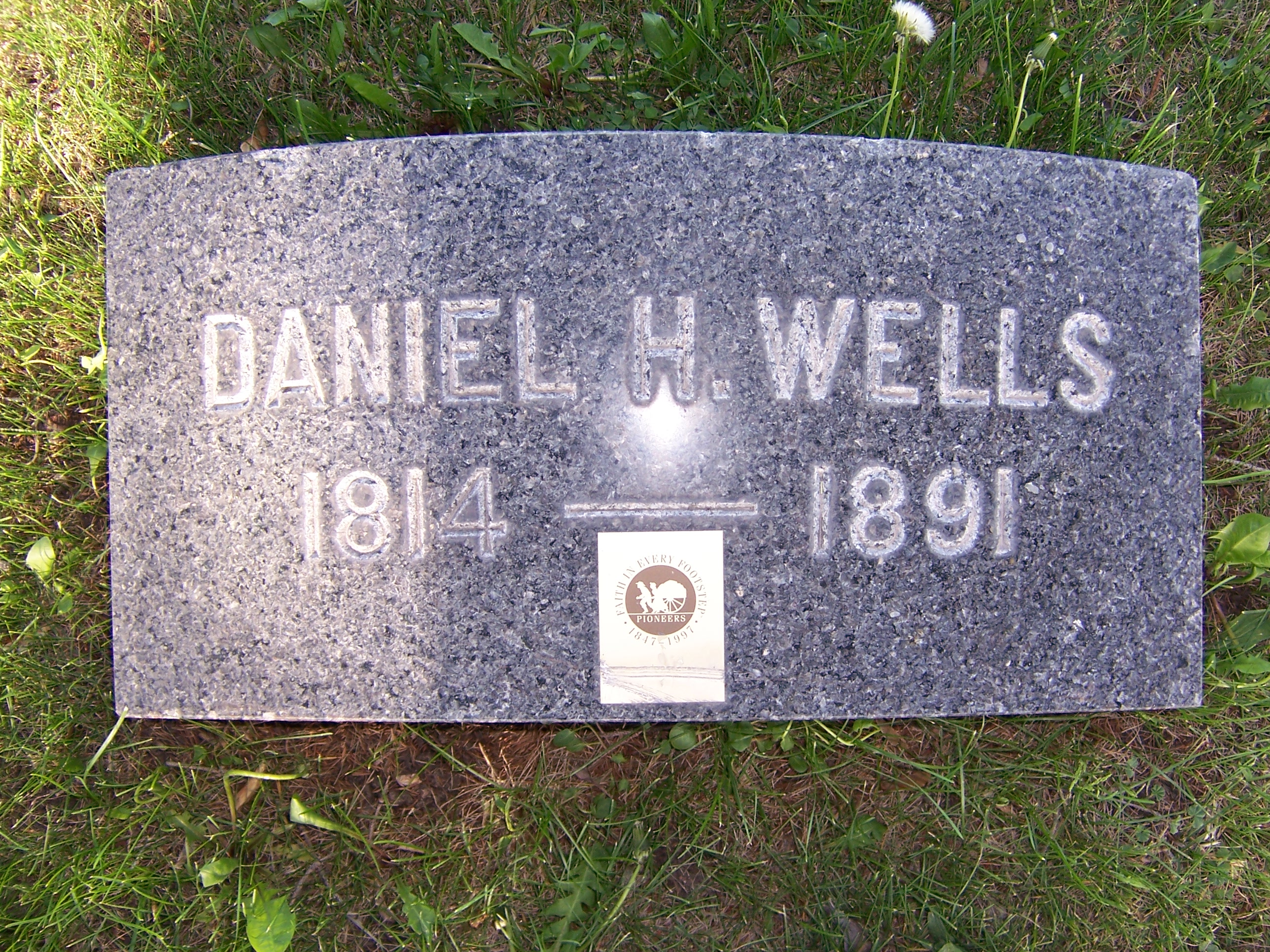
Daniel H. Wells's grave marker

== See also ==
- Junius F. Wells

Political offices
Preceded by Abraham O. Smoot	Mayor of Salt Lake City; 1866–1876	Succeeded by Feramorz Little
The Church of Jesus Christ of Latter-day Saints titles
Preceded by Jedediah M. Grant	Second Counselor in First Presidency; January 4, 1857 – August 29, 1877	Succeeded by Joseph F. Smith
