= Lot Smith =

American Mormon pioneer (1830–1892)

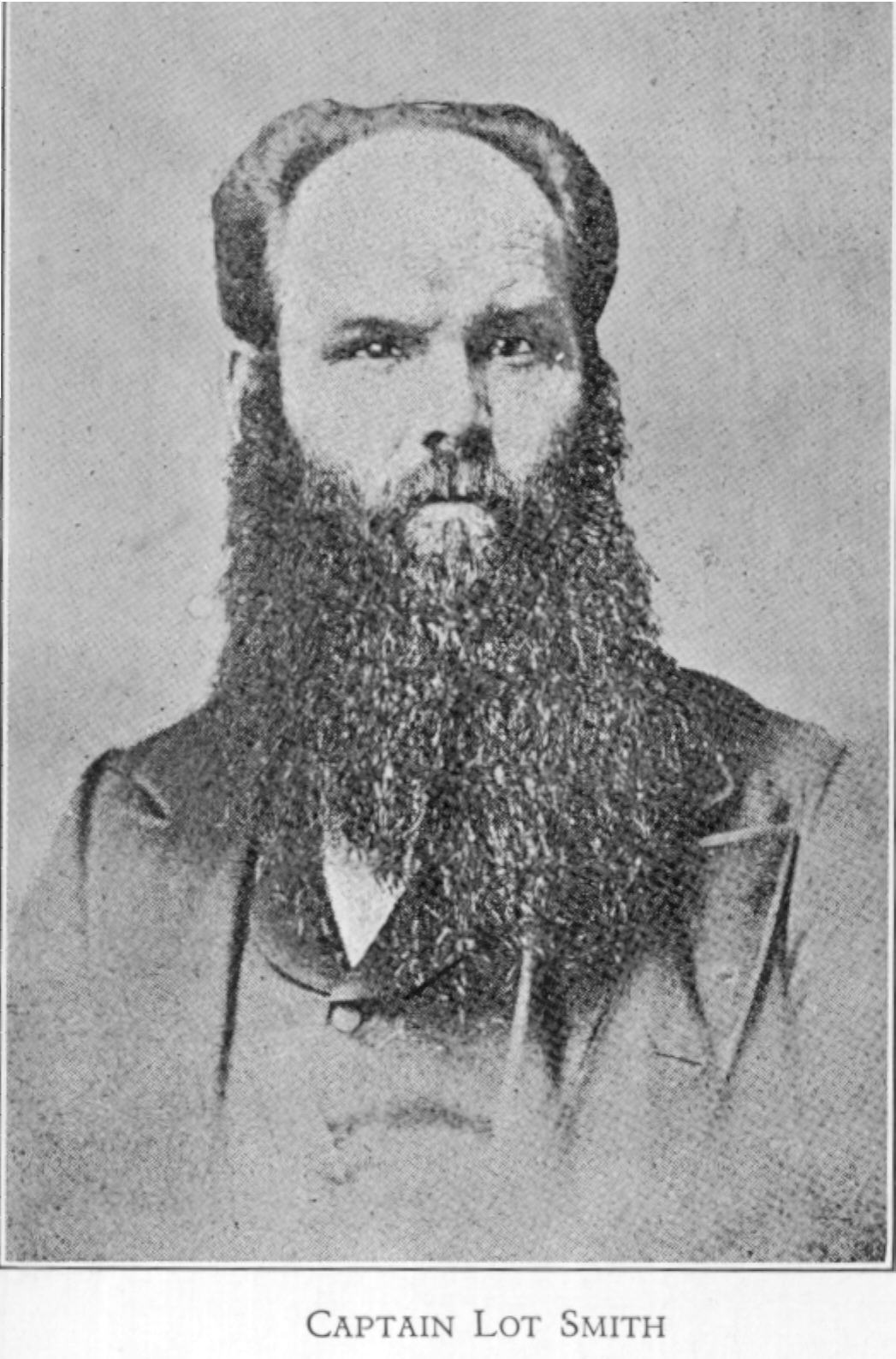

Member of the Utah Assembly for Davis and Morgan Counties
- In office January 8, 1872 – January 11, 1874
- Preceded by: Hector C. Haight
- Succeeded by: Arthur Stayner

1st Sheriff of Davis County, Utah
- In office 1854–1859
- Succeeded by: Phelemon C. Merrill
- Preceded by: Office established

Personal details
- Born: May 15, 1830 Williamstown, New York, U.S.
- Died: June 20, 1892 (aged 62) Tuba City, Arizona, U.S.
- Resting place: Farmington City Cemetery Farmington, Davis County, Utah, USA
- Party: Independent
- Occupation: Politician, rancher

Military service
- Allegiance: United States
- Branch/service: U.S. Army Nauvoo Legion Union Army
- Rank: Captain
- Unit: U.S. Army: Mormon Battalion; Nauvoo Legion: Deseret Militia; unknown; Utah Militia; Union Army: Lot Smith Cavalry Company
- Commands: Lot Smith Cavalry Company Utah Territorial Militia
- Battles/wars: Mexican-American War; Battle at Fort Utah; Utah War; American Civil War

Lot Smith (Deseret Alphabet spelling: 𐐢𐐱𐐻 𐐝𐑋𐐮𐑃) (May 15, 1830 – June 20, 1892) was a Mormon pioneer, soldier, lawman and American frontiersman. He became known as "The Horseman" for his exceptional skills on horseback as well as for his help in rounding up wild mustangs on Utah's Antelope Island. He is most famous for his exploits during the 1857 Utah War.

Smith practiced the Latter-day Saint doctrine of plural marriage, and had eight wives and 52 children.

== Background ==
Born in 1830 in Williamstown, Oswego County, New York, Lot, with his parents and other children in the family, left New York to be with other members of the Church of Jesus Christ of Latter-Day Saints. The Smith family lived across the Mississippi River from Nauvoo, Illinois, and were neighbors with Brigham Young's family. Lot was 14 years old when Joseph Smith, beloved as a prophet, was murdered. In 1846, while the family fled the continuing persecution of Mormons, Lot's mother was one of many Mormons who died and were buried in Iowa Territory.

== Mormon Battalion ==
At 16, Smith joined the Mormon Battalion and served during the Mexican–American War, making a journey, one of the most arduous overland marches in American history, from Fort Leavenworth, Kansas, through the southwest to San Diego, where the battalion was mustered out of service.

== Establishing himself in the West ==
After mustering out in California, other members of the Mormon Battalion worked at Sutter's Mill and discovered gold. Smith amassed a quantity of gold, then came back across the mountains to the Great Salt Lake and Farmington, Utah, where he married, became a military leader in the Nauvoo Legion in Utah and was distinguished in campaigns to stop Indian depredations.

== Service in the Battle at Fort Utah ==
In 1850, when Brigham Young called for the extermination of the Timpanogos, Smith volunteered as part of the Mormon militia. On February 8, in what was known as the Battle at Fort Utah, the army attacked the Timpanogos village. On the second day of fighting, he was chosen as part of 16 men to make a charge on a Timpanogos log house, from which the Timpanogos were trying to defend themselves. They successfully took the log cabin, and the Timpanogos retreated. They were able to pursue and kill around 100 Timpanogos people and enslave around 40.

== Service in the Utah War 1857 ==
The President and US Senate had chosen to remove then-governor Brigham Young from office based on reports from federal officials assigned to Utah who had abandoned their assignments and returned to the east. Young's replacement as governor of Utah territory Alfred Cumming was escorted by a contingent of 1,400 Federal troops led by Gen. Albert Johnston as part of what was called the Utah Expedition. The army's orders were to support the installment of the new governor, using force as necessary as resistance was expected based on the official's reports.

Smith was sent on a special mission by Young, who hoped to delay the arrival of the troops in the hope that a diplomatic breakthrough could be reached before the troops reached Salt Lake City. Smith led a group of Nauvoo Legion rangers east across Wyoming along the stretch where the California, Oregon and Mormon Trails merge. Mormons, including Orrin Porter Rockwell harassed the army by burning the grass along the route, stampeding the army mules, and driving off their cattle. Fort Bridger, Wyoming was burned to the ground. Smith ordered the Union wagon trains of supplies to turn around but they complied only while he was in sight. Then, in one night, Smith and his men burned three wagon trains of supplies (food, clothing, gunpowder and whiskey for an entire army). Lot Smith and his rangers held off the Federal soldiers until an early blizzard and cold winter weather set in. The army was forced to winter near the ruins of Fort Bridger, Wyoming.

Smith's efforts and the weather stopped the army — without Mormon troops harming any soldiers on the Federal side. A diplomatic settlement brokered by Col. Thomas L. Kane and the Utah War Peace Commission, allowed Governor Cumming to take office peaceably and protected the civilian population from the army.

== Service in the Civil War ==
Lot Smith commanded a company of volunteer militia mustered mainly from the Nauvoo Legion that, at the request of Abraham Lincoln, guarded the telegraph line in conjunction with the U.S. Army during the Civil War. The Utah Volunteer Cavalry Company served under orders for 90 days during the summer of 1862 and was mustered out of federal service in August having experienced no combat.

== Elected to public office ==
Lot Smith was the first sheriff of Davis County, Utah. He also served in the Utah Territorial Legislature, serving in the lower house and upper house of the legislature.

== Settlement in Northern Arizona ==
Smith was asked to help the development of the Mormon settlement along the Little Colorado River. Smith led a large group that arrived in the spring of 1876 settling Sunset, Arizona and Brigham City, Arizona near present-day Winslow. Up river, Obed and St. Joseph (now Joseph City, Arizona) were colonized. Local Indians were befriended, Lot Smith became highly respected among the Navajo Indians. The establishment of settlements at the Sunset Crossing of the Little Colorado River was important in facilitating the subsequent Mormon colonization of eastern and central and southern Arizona, eastern New Mexico and even northern Mexico and southern Colorado. All branches of the Honeymoon Trail fanned out from this point. Lot Smith established a United Order at Sunset and became the first LDS Stake President in Arizona. Flash floods, droughts, crop failures, internal dissension, anti-Mormon sentiment and prosecution of polygamous leaders, and the Aztec Land & Cattle Company or Hashknife Outfit all took their toll on the small settlements. Tensions rose. Although Smith's inspiring oratory was appreciated, some ran afoul of his temper and others found him heavy-handed and resented his domineering.

Residents gravitated toward the timbered land closer to the Mogollon Rim. Lot Smith built a home at Smith Spring near Mormon Lake and directed the establishment of a dairy, sawmill and ranching operations in the area.

== Gunplay ==
Seeking to displace the Circle S ranching operations, a sheepman named Daggs hired a Hashknife cowboy/gunman named Thistle to eliminate Lot Smith. The strategy was to pick a fight with the targeted person, get him to draw, then shoot him and claim self-defense. Daggs and Thistle encountered Smith working livestock in his corral with two young sons. Thistle proceeded to goad Smith to anger. Smith turned and began walking to his house to get a firearm. Daggs urged Thistle to "Shoot him now." Thistle declined to shoot an unarmed man in the back. Smith returned with a rifle and saw Thistle's pistol and hand starting to come out from where Thistle had taken cover. Shooting from the hip, Smith hit Thistle's pistol and amputated one of Thistle's fingers. That was the end of the gunfight but not the end of the trouble. Knowing Lot Smith was already subject to a federal warrant for polygamy, Daggs instigated another warrant for the arrest of Smith for the "assault" on Thistle. Smith, respected by local lawmen, was able to appear in court for an acquittal and avoid federal arrest. Daggs moved his sheep away and into the Tonto Basin, fueling the smoldering Tewksberry–Graham feud into the conflagration of the Pleasant Valley War.

== Death ==
After 1886, with the collapse of the Sunset community and Smith's release from presiding church office, along with crippling injuries from farm machinery and continuing threat of prosecution for polygamy, Smith's star was descendant. In 1892 he had taken up residence in cabins with two wives in Big Canyon, east of Tuba City, Arizona, where Mormons had early proselytized local Hopi and Navajo Native Americans.

Although relations with the Indians, especially the Hopi, were initially cooperative, the growing numbers of Mormons in the Tuba City area began to cause friction in an area with limited water, grazing and farming resources. Non-Mormons were also jealous of the Mormon influence in the area. Another plot was hatched to eliminate the old Mormon, Lot Smith, and to spark conflict between the Mormons and the Native Americans. This time some of the war-like Navajo were chosen as pawns and scapegoats.

On June 20, 1892, Smith found a flock of sheep turned into his fenced field of new barley by Navajo sheepherders. Horseback, Smith tried to drive the sheep out but Navajos at the gate repeatedly used their blankets to shoo the animals back in. Angered, Smith returned to his cabin to get his pistol. His wife, fearful of the consequences, pleaded with him not to go back. His ire kindled, Smith returned to his barley crop and again tried to drive the sheep out. Now, each time a sheep was shooed back from the gate, Smith would shoot the animal. The Indians retaliated in kind, shooting several of Smith's nearby milch cows.

At an impasse, Smith began to ride away back to his cabin. Along the way a pistol-packing Navajo, Cat-chose, had set up to ambush Smith. Nearly simultaneously, Smith was shot in the back by a rifle and mortally wounded. Smith died that evening, accompanied by keening mourning of a crowd of Native American friends and onlookers. Although the plotters succeeded in killing Lot Smith, they were thwarted in their attempt to spark a conflict between the Mormons and the Native Americans. The local Mormon community was stunned and saddened by the loss of a patriarch, but revenge was forestalled by the local Mormon bishop who advised the community to "do nothing and say nothing."

Smith was buried near his cabin. A decade later, due to his grave being full of natural spring water, his remains were returned with great pomp and ceremony to Farmington, Utah where his grave became something of a symbol of the Mormon pioneer as frontiersman, soldier, and Indian fighter.
