= Rulon S. Wells =

American politician (1854–1941)

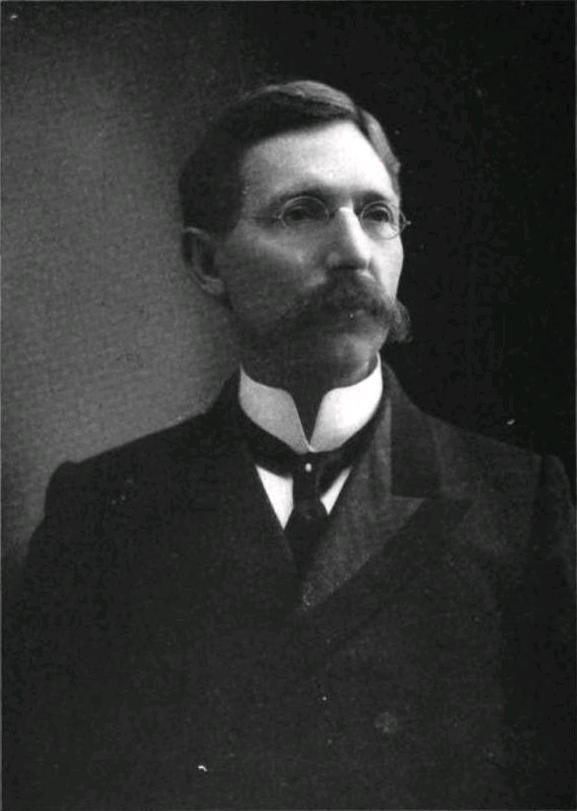

First Council of the Seventy
- April 5, 1893 – May 7, 1941
- Called by: Wilford Woodruff

Personal details
- Born: Rulon Seymour Wells; July 7, 1854; Salt Lake City, Utah Territory, United States
- Died: May 7, 1941 (aged 86); Salt Lake City, Utah, United States

Rulon Seymour Wells (July 7, 1854 – May 7, 1941) was an American politician of Utah and was a general authority of the Church of Jesus Christ of Latter-day Saints (LDS Church) from 1893 until his death.

== Biography ==
Wells was born in Salt Lake City, Utah Territory, to LDS Church leader Daniel H. Wells (1814–1891) and Louisa Free (1824–1886). In 1875, Wells travelled to Europe as a Mormon missionary and worked primarily in Germany and Switzerland. He returned to the United States in 1877. On January 18, 1883 he married Josephine Eliza Beatie (1857–1923).

In April 1893, Wells was chosen as a member of the seven-man First Council of the Seventy. In 1896, he succeeded Anthon H. Lund as the president of the European Mission of the church, headquartered in Liverpool, England.

In December 1898, Wells returned to Utah. In the United States election in 1900, Wells was elected to the Utah House of Representatives. He served as a member of the house for its 4th session, which lasted from January to March 1901. He did not stand for re-election in 1902.

Following the death of J. Golden Kimball in 1938, Wells became the senior president of the Seventy, a position he held until his own death in 1941.

Wells died in Salt Lake City from colon cancer; he had been a general authority of the church for almost 50 years.
