= Tutsegabit =

Tutsegabit was a 19th-century leader of the Piede (Chemehuevi) bands of the Paiute tribe.

In 1857 Tutsegabit was the chief of six bands of Chemehuevi Piutes (Piedes). Together with another Chemehuevi chief, Youngwuds, some Tonaquint Pahute chiefs (likely "Jackson"), and several Ute chiefs (Kanosh, the Pahvant Ute Mormon chief, Ammon, Sahoeech ["Sanpitch"] Ute chief Walkara's stepbrother), on September 1 he met Brigham Young and Dimick B. Huntington at Great Salt Lake, and Young offered them as a booty the cattle stock from the not Mormon wagon trains travelling in the territory, stating that Mormon's enemies were Indian's enemies; the chiefs agreed.

After Mountain Meadows Massacre, Tutsegabit was charged to have been involved in the massacre as an accomplice of Lee's Mormons.

It is known that Tutsegabit was in Salt Lake City on September 1, 1857, and that he was ordained an elder by Brigham Young. To have been present at Mountain Meadows when the massacre occurred, he would have had to have returned to southern Utah by September 11. Dimick B. Huntington in his journal claims that Tutsegabit was in Salt Lake City on September 10. Wilford Woodruff records Tutsegabit's ordination as an elder in his September 16 journal entry, but Woodruff does not indicate the day on which the actual ordination occurred.
