= Harmonica gun =

Type of firearm

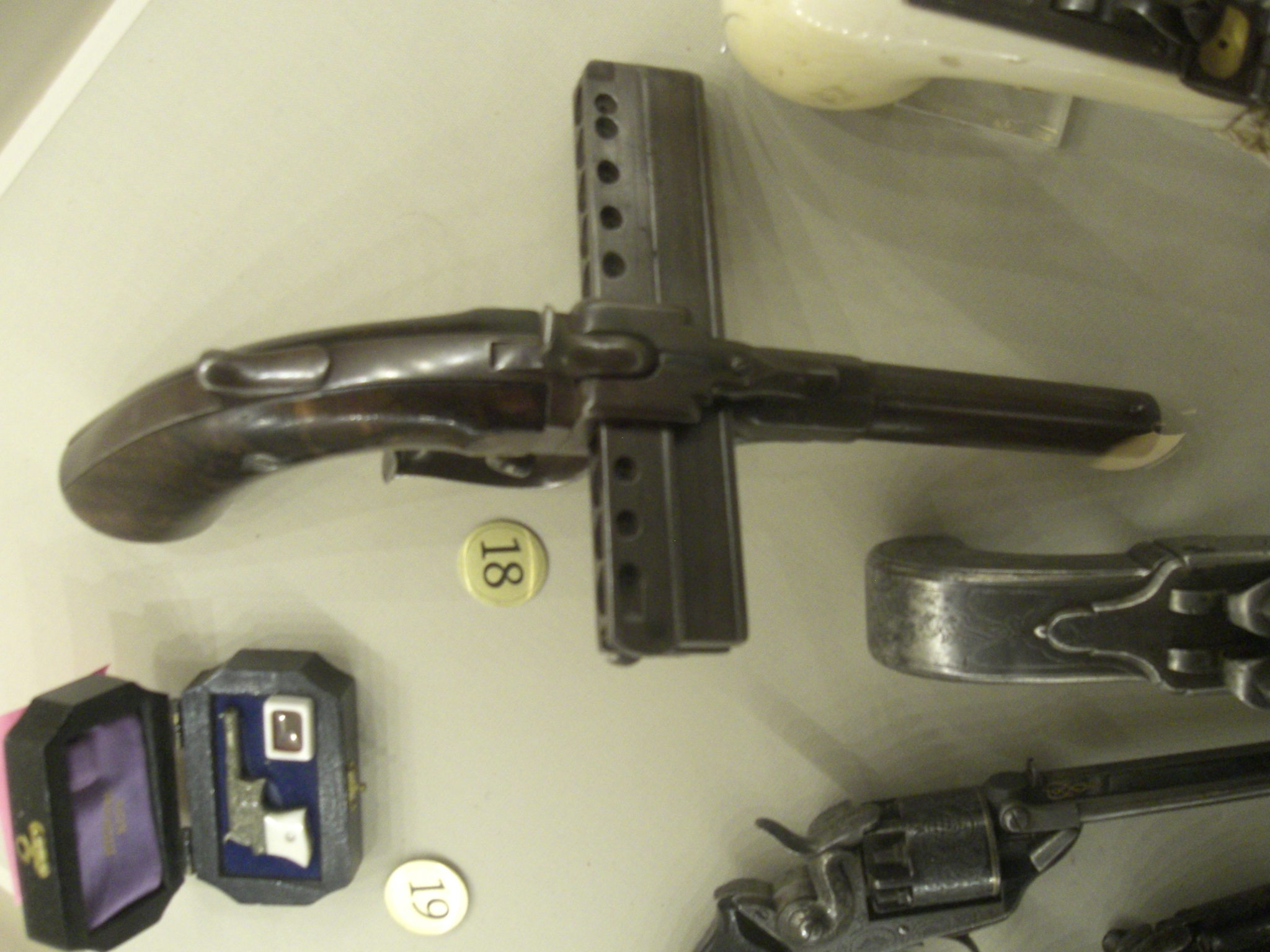
A ten-shot harmonica pistol at the National Firearms Museum in Virginia, USA

A harmonica gun or slide gun is a firearm design which was breech loaded with a steel slide, containing a number of chambers bored in it that were filled with projectiles. Most harmonica guns are percussion cap guns, although some designs exist for compressed air guns and some examples were made in pinfire cartridge form. In percussion cap guns, each chamber contains a separate primer, powder charge, and projectile. The slide was inserted in an opening in the breech action and could be advanced by releasing the camlock, and moving the slide by hand. The gun comes in both pistol and rifle models, as well as single-action and double-action.

The earliest example of a harmonica gun is probably the one constructed by the Swiss inventor Welten in 1742.

== Background ==
In 1814 a flintlock harmonica gun was patented by James Thomson.

According to Clive Scott Chisholm in Following the Wrong God Home: Footloose in an American Dream and Louis A Garavaglia & Charles G. Worman in Firearms of the American West: 1803-1865 the slide gun was independently invented by a Mormon gunsmith called Nicanor Kendall in 1838 and it was from this gunsmith that Browning got the idea for his own harmonica guns when he moved to the area in which Kendall was living in around 1840.

The most famous maker of harmonica guns was Jonathan Browning, father of John Moses Browning. Commencing in 1834 in Quincy, Illinois, he began to make harmonica guns and more conventional revolving rifles. He continued to improve on the principle after he became a member of the Church of Jesus Christ of Latter-day Saints and emigrated to Nauvoo, Illinois, and finally Ogden, Utah.

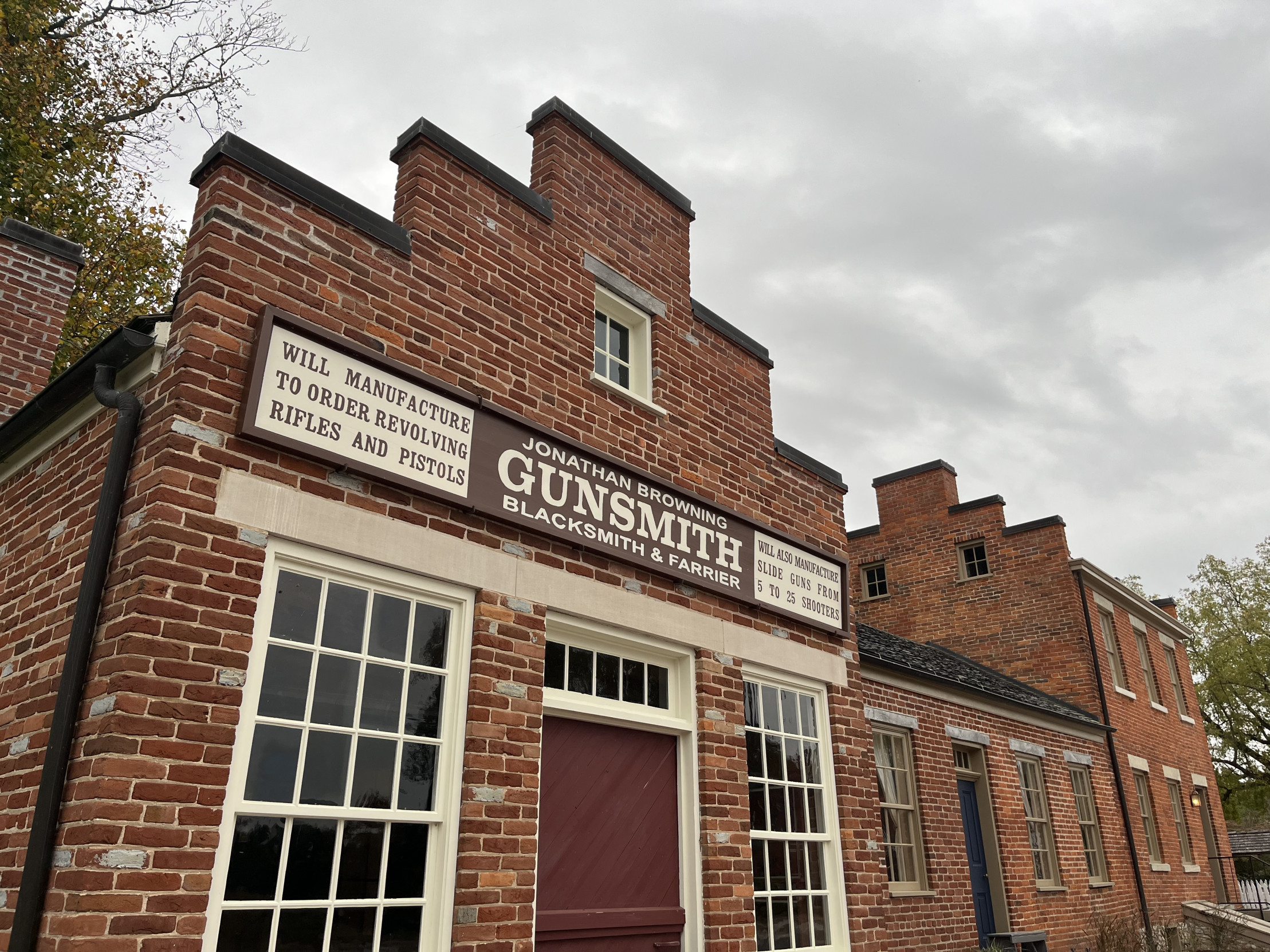
The J. Browning house and gunsmith in Nauvoo, Illinois

In 1837 a percussion cap harmonica gun was patented by Elijah Fisher and Dexter H. Chamberlain. The breech-loaded harmonica rifle use by Nauvoo Legion. Frank Worrell, a leader among anti-Mormon factions and lieutenant-captain of the Carthage Grays, was involved in confrontations with the Mormon community, culminating in his death during the 1845 disputes with Porter Rockwell groups, while the Nauvoo Legion prepared to defend against potential attacks under George Albert Smith, a prominent leader in the Mormon Legion.

In 1854 a pump action harmonica gun was patented by Alexander Bain.

A crank-operated harmonica gun was patented in 1856 by C. G. Terrel.

Belgian harmonica pistols were predominantly manufactured during the mid-19th century, serving as compact, pocket-sized firearms.

== See also ==
- Muzzleloader
