= William Huntington (Mormon) =

- Born: March 28, 1784; New Grantham, New Hampshire
- Died: August 9, 1846 (aged 62); Mount Pisgah, Iowa
- Known for: Early leader in the Church of Jesus Christ of Latter-day Saints
- Spouse(s): Zina Baker (1806–1839); Lydia Clisbee
- Children: 10, including Zina D. H. Young

William Huntington (March 28, 1784 – August 19, 1846) was an early leader in the Church of Jesus Christ of Latter-day Saints (LDS Church), most prominently during the time the Mormon pioneers were moving from Nauvoo, Illinois, to Salt Lake City.

Huntington was born in New Grantham, New Hampshire, to William and Prescindia Lathrop Huntington on March 28, 1784. In 1804, he and his parents moved to Watertown, Jefferson County, New York. On December 28, 1806, Huntington married Zina Baker and they became the parents of ten children. He then served in the War of 1812, becoming involved in conflicts such as the Battle of Sackett's Harbor. Huntington was a member of the local Presbyterian Church, but decided to step away from the faith after concluding that none of the religions on earth were correct. Then, in the winter of 1832–33, William and Zina Huntington first read the Book of Mormon. Both were baptized members of the Church of the Latter Day Saints in 1835.

In 1836, Huntington moved to Kirtland, Ohio in a company of Latter Day Saints from upstate New York led by Orson Pratt and Luke S. Johnson. Huntington was one of the investors in the Kirtland Safety Society, in which institution he lost about $500. While in Ohio, Huntington served on the Kirtland High Council. He also housed Joseph Smith's Egyptian mummies for a time. He then moved to Missouri and settled in Adam-ondi-Ahman. As the commissary for provisions and arms for the church in Missouri, Huntington often took charge of negotiations with local mobs. When the Latter Day Saints were forced to leave Missouri in the winter of 1838–39, Huntington was appointed by Brigham Young to be one of the men to supervise the helping of the poor. As they were leaving Missouri, William Huntington's wife Zina died.

Huntington was one of the first Mormons to settle in Nauvoo, Illinois. In October 1839, he was appointed a member of the Nauvoo High Council, a position he held until the Mormons left the city in 1846. He also played a role in the construction and operation of the Nauvoo Temple, laying one of the building's cornerstones and serving as an ordinance worker once the edifice was completed. On August 28, 1840, he married Lydia Clisbee Partridge, the widow of Edward Partridge. Huntington left Nauvoo on February 9, 1846. He led a group of Mormon pioneers (consisting of 50 wagons) westward to Iowa. In 1846, Huntington was made the presiding authority of the church in Mount Pisgah, Iowa. His counselors were Ezra T. Benson and Charles C. Rich, both of whom would later be called to the Quorum of the Twelve Apostles.

Huntington died on August 9, 1846, in Mount Pisgah, Iowa.

Huntington's daughter Zina D. H. Young would later serve as president of the LDS Church's Relief Society. His son Dimick B. Huntington was a major figure in relations between the Mormon settlers and the Native Americans in Utah Territory. Author George McCune has written of Huntington: "His love and zeal for the Kingdom were unsurpassed by any. His judgment was respected, his conduct never questioned, and he never had a difficulty with a Church member."
