= Hector C. Haight =

American politician and Mormon missionary

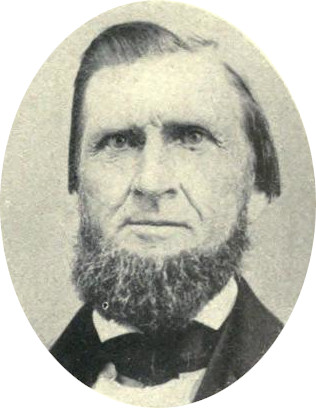

Member of the Utah Assembly from Davis and Morgan Counties
- In office 1866–1870
- Preceded by: Franklin D. Richards
- Succeeded by: Lot Smith

Personal details
- Born: 17 January 1810
- Died: 16 June 1879 (aged 69)
- Party: Independent

Hector Caleb Haight (January 17, 1810 – June 16, 1879) was an American politician and Mormon pioneer.

== Biography ==
Haight was born on January 17, 1810, in Windham, New York. At the age of 37, Haight joined the Daniel Spencer/Ira Eldredge Company in 1847.

On May 7, 1855, at the age of 45, he was called as the President to the Scandinavian Mission, a proselytizing effort during which he served until February 4, 1858. He would succeed John Van Cott in this role. At the time of his calling, he was plurally married, held the priesthood office of Seventy, and resided in Farmington, Davis, Utah Territory, United States. He departed from his home on September 9, 1855, arrived in the mission field on January 1, 1856, and officially took charge of the mission, which spanned various Scandinavian countries. His journey back involved traveling with the Horace S. Eldredge Company from May 8 to July 11, 1858, at the age of 48, participating as one of the pioneers in the company, which arrived by July 11. Later, on October 10, 1874, at the age of 64, he served in the Eastern States Mission in the United States. He continued to hold a priesthood office of Seventy, and his calling was overseen by Wilford Woodruff. His missionary service began immediately upon being set apart in 1874.

== Political career ==
Haight served in the Utah Assembly for 4 terms from 1866 to 1870, succeeding Franklin D. Richards. He was followed by Lot Smith.

=== Committees ===
During his tenure in the Utah Legislature, Haight served on several committees, including the committees on Corporations, Penitentiary, Postal Affairs, Revision and the Committee on Roads, Bridges, Ferries and Canyons.
