= Zina Young Card =

American religious leader and activist

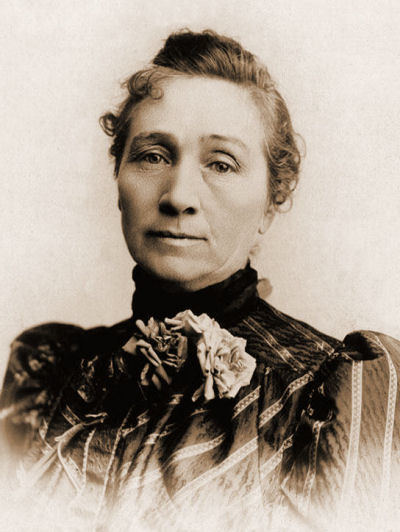
- Born: Zina Presendia Young; April 3, 1850; Salt Lake City, Utah Territory
- Died: January 31, 1931 (aged 80); Salt Lake City, Utah
- Spouses: Thomas C. Williams (m. 1868–1874 (his death)); Charles Ora Card (m. 1884–1906 (his death))
- Children: 5, including Zina Young Card Brown
- Parents: Brigham Young (father); Zina D. H. Young (mother)
- Family: Susa Young Gates (half-sister)

Zina Presendia Young Williams Card (April 3, 1850 – January 31, 1931) was an American religious leader and women's rights activist. A daughter of Brigham Young, the second president of the Church of Jesus Christ of Latter-day Saints (LDS Church), she was the first "Dean of Women" at Brigham Young Academy (BYA) (now Brigham Young University) in Provo, Utah. She fought on a national level for women's suffrage and the right to practice plural marriage. After moving to a new Mormon settlement at Cardston, Alberta, Canada, she became a major civic and religious leader of the community.

== Early life ==
Zina Presendia Young was born April 3, 1850, to Brigham Young and Zina D. H. Young in Salt Lake City, Utah Territory. She lived with her mother, twelve of Young's other plural wives, and twenty-nine half-siblings in her father's Lion House. One of her half-siblings was Susa Young Gates. Zina was one of the "big ten," a group of ten daughters of Young born within three years. Zina was her mother's only daughter. She remembered her upbringing fondly, describing it as "joyous." She shared a close and loving relationship with her mother. Education was a priority in the Young family, and Card learned dance, music, and theater at home. Compared to other pioneers, she had a privileged upbringing. During General Albert Johnston's invasion of Utah, her family moved away from Salt Lake City.

At the age of thirteen, she began acting at the Salt Lake Theatre. At the age of nineteen, she was appointed secretary of the reorganized Retrenchment Association at the direction of her father.

== Plural marriage ==
At the Salt Lake Theatre, Card met her first husband, Thomas Child Williams, treasurer of the theater and scribe to her father. She was eighteen and he was forty when they married on October 12, 1868. She became a plural wife, and gave birth to two sons: Sterling Williams (b. September 21, 1870) and Thomas Edgar Williams (b. July 21, 1873). On July 17, 1874, Williams died; this was followed by her father's death in 1877 and her son Thomas's death in 1881.

In 1884, she married again, this time to small farmer and local leader Charles Ora Card. The two first met while she was matron of BYA. His daughter was studying there under Card's (then Williams's) stewardship. Card and her mother were then called to move to Logan, Utah, to work in the newly constructed Logan Temple. They were planning to buy Mr. Card's house when he wrote a letter to Zina proposing marriage. She was very surprised and did not answer him until she "had a dream that convinced her that he was the right man". Card thus became a plural wife for the second time on June 17, 1884. Her new husband married again six months later, and the entire Card family became a target for U.S. federal marshals enforcing anti-polygamy law. Both Zina and Charles lived in hiding: sometimes together, sometimes apart. They wrote letters to each other using false names. Her relationship with Card's other wives was cordial. When it was decided that he would flee north to Canada, Zina was chosen by her sister-wives to accompany him. She and Card had three children.

Throughout her life, she spoke highly of plural marriage. Much of her visit to Washington, D.C., involved lobbying against anti-polygamy legislation. Card addressed both the U.S. House Judiciary Committee and Senate on the matter. She told Senator George F. Edmunds of Vermont that plural marriage "seemed far more holy and upright and just to womankind than any other order of marriage". She felt it was a sacred and holy institution in which she'd had the pleasure of participating from childhood to adulthood. When LDS President Wilford Woodruff issued his manifesto ending the official practice of polygamy in the LDS Church, Card wrote a letter describing it as "a very strange pill" but concluded that it "was needed in our present state, religiously and politically".

== Career and activism ==
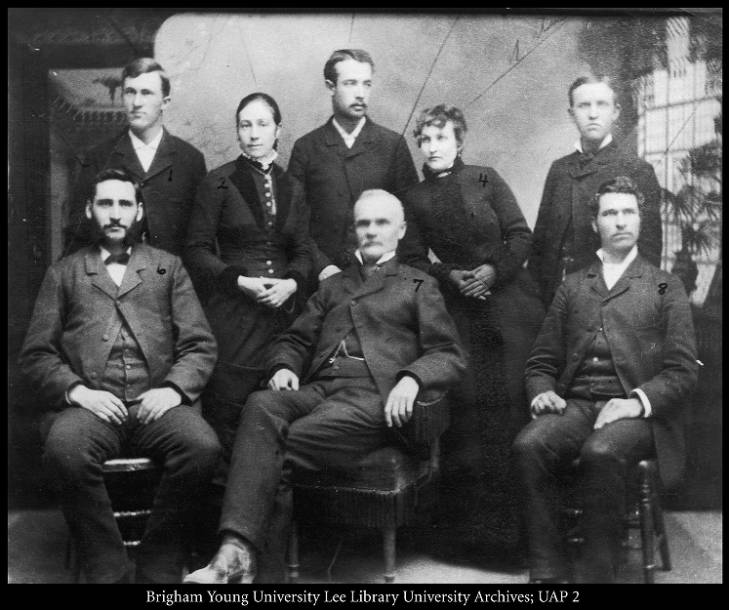
Faculty of Brigham Young Academy in 1884

After Williams's death, Card supported herself and her sons by "teaching people how to make wax flowers", as well as producing silk from scratch. She decided to attend school in 1878 at BYA, and went on to become its first Ladies' Matron. She worked to ensure the LDS Church's support of the school. For seven years she was in charge of the "domestic science department". She emphasized a knowledge of nursing and biology.

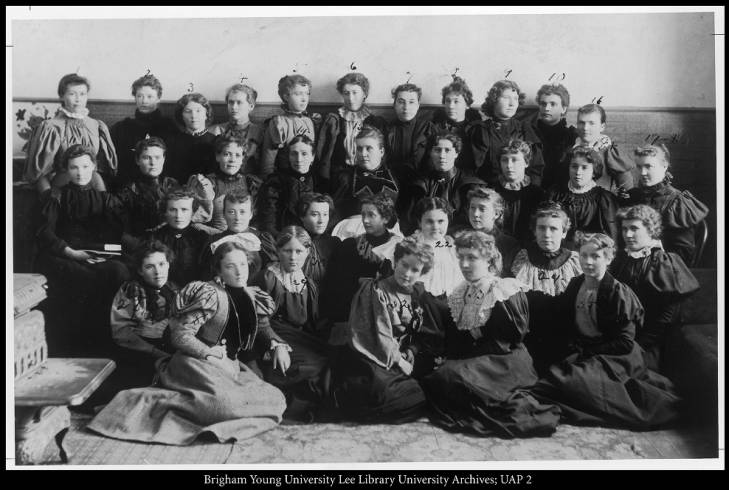
Brigham Young Academy domestic science department

As the "Dean of Women" of BYA, Card was assigned by LDS Church president John Taylor to attend the 1879 convention of the National Woman Suffrage Association shortly after Reynolds v. United States ruled that the first amendment did not protect the practice of polygamy. She was among the first Utah women to advocate for women's suffrage. Card and Emmeline B. Wells traveled to Washington, D.C., speaking of and advocating for women's suffrage and their own religious beliefs, especially polygamy. She spoke to the U.S. Senate and House Judiciary Committee in favor of plural marriage. While in Washington, Card met Susan B. Anthony, Elizabeth Cady Stanton, and President Rutherford B. Hayes. When Card and Wells returned to Utah, they traveled around the state, sharing their experiences in Washington.

As the "first lady" of the first Latter-day Saint settlement in Canada, Card mingled with Canadian politicians, journalists, and merchants, often entertaining them in her own home. She did not shy away from expressing her opinions. Her husband, Charles, reported that she would occasionally utter "some rather sharp retorts" when defending her beliefs, especially concerning polygamy. She participated in Cardston's business matters, namely the establishment of a sawmill, creamery, cheese factory, and general store. She often invested her own money in such local ventures. She continued her love of theater on a local level, establishing a theater in Cardston and a "dramatics association". Card also became a midwife for the women of Cardston. Together, the Cards traveled to neighboring settlements and delivered speeches; Zina was often deemed "the stronger orator".

Card was the matron of LDS Business School during the final years of her life. In this role, she wrote what she believed to be the job of a matron; she felt that worldly knowledge was inadequate without spiritual understanding. She was also appointed chairman of the Relic Committee of the Daughters of Utah Pioneers before becoming president of the organization in 1909. She served on the Board of Trustees for Brigham Young University from 1918 until her death.

== LDS Church service ==
Young's first exposure to leadership within the LDS Church was her involvement in the Young Ladies' Department of the Ladies' Cooperative Retrenchment Association. She then served as the Utah Stake Primary president and counselor of the Utah Stake Young Ladies' Mutual Improvement Association (YLMIA).

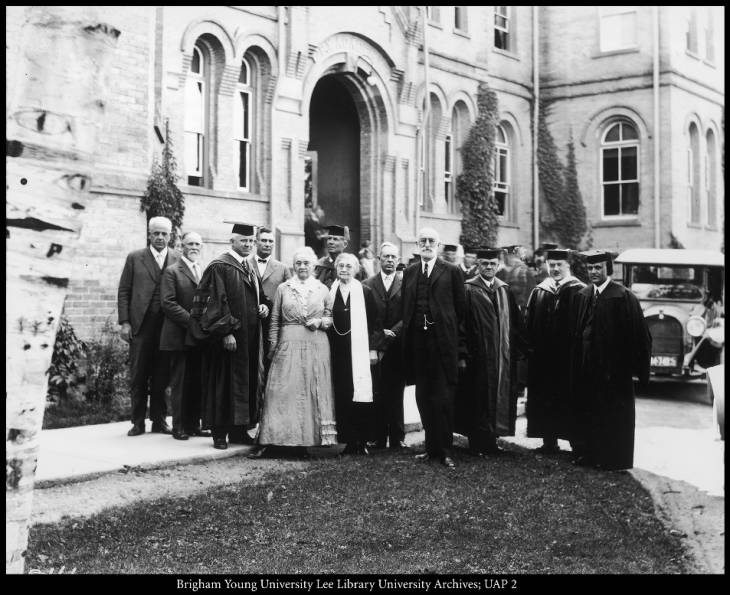
Brigham Young University Board of Trustees, 1920s

In 1887, Card moved to Canada when her husband, Charles, was tasked with establishing a Latter-day Saint colony to the north. Though she was nervous to leave behind her aging mother, she left with a group of people from Cache Valley, travelling via wagons. She bought her own supplies for the trip.

When the group reached the settlement of Cardston, Alberta on June 3, 1887, Zina and Charles were reunited. In time she assumed the role of "Cardston's First Lady", welcoming various dignitaries into her home. She continued her work in the YLMIA in Alberta as its president for sixteen years. In this capacity, she guided the spiritual and social lives of women and girls throughout southern Alberta. They would gather as a group in her home to act out plays or hold educational events.

After her second husband's death, she was on the LDS Church's Primary General Board. She also worked in the Salt Lake Temple.

== Personal life ==
Card's close relationship to her mother continued throughout her life. When Zina's first husband, Thomas C. Williams, died, her mother moved in with her to help. After she moved to Canada, her mother visited often. Card, in return, would travel to Utah to visit her mother, often bringing her children with her. On one such trip in 1901, the elder Zina died.

The death of Card's 8-year-old son, Thomas E. Williams, on April 21, 1881, was soon followed by a broken year-long engagement between her and an unknown man. She did, however, marry again. Both she and her second husband, Charles Card, expressed love and admiration for one another in their letters. Before escaping to Canada, Zina and Charles were separated for the majority of their marriage. Card also had warm, personal relationships her sister-wives; they interacted frequently during their husband's absence. Through her writing it is apparent that she felt plural marriage a respectable and divinely-inspired institution, and she saw defending it as the duty of women.

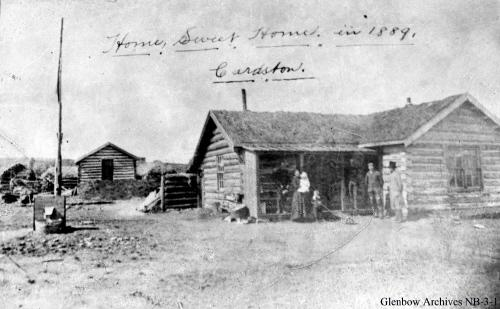
C.O. Card House, Cardston, Alberta, Canada (c. 1889)

In addition to her sons, Sterling and Joseph, Card gave birth to a daughter, Zina Young Card Brown, in 1888 and a son, Orson Rega Card, in 1891. The family first lived in a tent during the summer months in Alberta, then moved into a one-room log cabin. Here, the family welcomed distinguished guests and held parties and other events for the community. They also welcomed local native people, probably Blood Indians (Kainai Nation), into their home. She invited their children to the Cardston school and proposed that the settlers' children learn their language. According to her daughter, Card enjoyed storytelling and drawing. She balanced her time between her civic duties and motherhood. Similar to that of her childhood, Card's home was peaceful, clean, and well-organized. Once Card inherited a large sum from her father she had a larger brick home built for $6,000.

She and Charles Card moved back to Utah in 1903 when he began struggling with his health. He died in 1906. She enjoyed continued financial stability and remained in Salt Lake City. She experienced health problems, especially with her vision, after nursing Spanish flu patients. She also began to suffer from psoriasis, but reportedly endured it well. While recovering, she had a near-death experience, which she shared with her family. She maintained her activity in church and educational leadership roles until her death on January 31, 1931. She was 80 years old. She is remembered for her familial and religious devotion.

=== Zina Young Card Brown ===
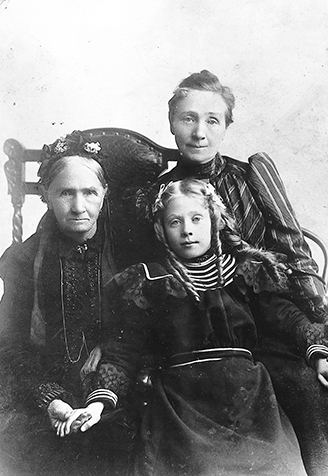
Zina P. Card with her mother, Zina D. H. Young and daughter Zina Brown

Card's only daughter, the fourth Zina, was Zina Young Card Brown.

Like her mother, Brown valued education; she studied elocution and domestic science at Brigham Young College in Logan. In 1908 she married future LDS Apostle Hugh B. Brown in the Salt Lake Temple. She gave birth to eight children. While Hugh was stationed in France during World War I, Brown managed his finances and survived the 1918 flu epidemic along with all of her children. The elder Zina visited them in Canada as much as possible, and Brown in turn often visited her mother in Salt Lake City. At the age of 48, Brown was called to serve in the British mission alongside her husband, but fled England at the onset of World War II. When it was safe to return to London after the war, she arranged for clothing to be sent from the church in Salt Lake City to help needy church members in London.

After finishing their years in London, Hugh and Zina Brown returned to Utah and moved to Provo. He worked at Brigham Young University, where seven of their eight children attended school. In 1953, Hugh was called as an Assistant to the Twelve Apostles. Zina accompanied him in his travels around the world, including to destinations such as South Africa, Australia, New Zealand, Hawaii, and Fiji, and was often asked to speak at conferences and events. He was then called as an Apostle in 1958, and then as second counselor to David O. McKay in the First Presidency in 1960.

After suffering a stroke, Brown became unable to speak and move. She was bedridden for eight years before her death on December 19, 1974, at the age of eighty-six. Most of the LDS general authorities attended her funeral, and the First Presidency—Marion G. Romney, N. Eldon Tanner, and Spencer W. Kimball—spoke highly of her life.

== Legacy ==
"When Zina Young Card ... died the last day of January, 1931, in Salt Lake City, there passed from this world a woman whose memory will never fade nor dim before the light of other names so long as Cardston remains to testify of her worth. To all Cardstonians she was known as "Aunt Zina," for she was a sister to every mother and a friend to all."

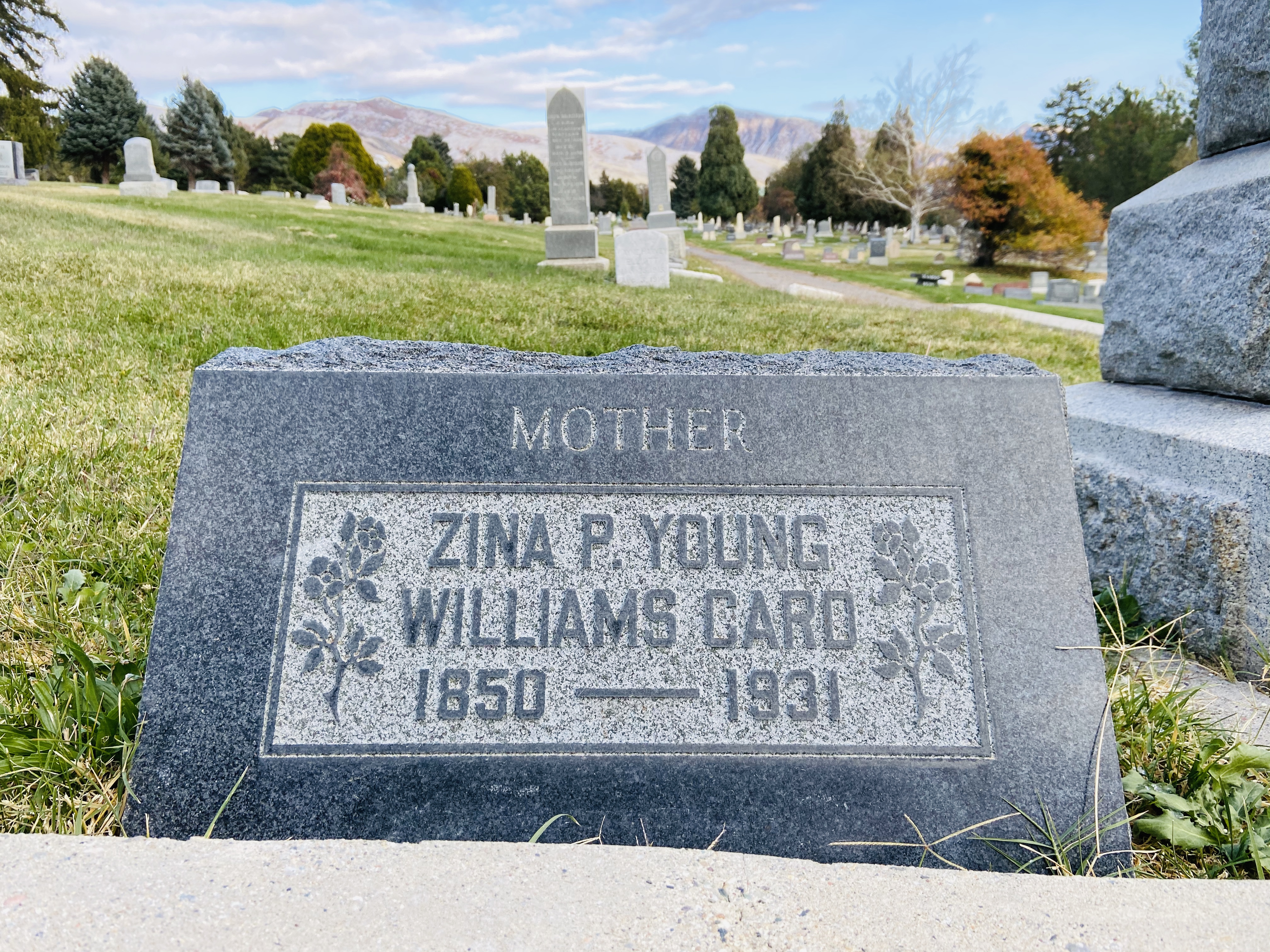
Grave of Zina P. Young Card in the Salt Lake City Cemetery

Throughout her life, Card was an academic, political, and spiritual leader, with Maureen Ursenbach Beecher identifying her as "the unquestionable female leader of the Alberta colonies". She served as the "Dean of Women" of Brigham Young Academy, advocated for women's suffrage and polygamist rights on a national level, and interacted with political leaders and businessmen while in Canada. While in the U.S., she met President Rutherford B. Hayes and the first lady, as well as other politicians. Card consistently championed education for all. She held multiple leadership positions within the LDS Church, constantly travelling and speaking with varieties of people. As "Cardston's First Lady", she guided the Mormon colonists; through her role as a church leader for the young women, she led women and girls. She worked to establish good relations with Cardston's neighbors, the Blood Indian Tribe. Her other efforts as a public servant included promoting the performing arts, midwifery, strengthening family units, and developing industries, such as farming, livestock, mills, and factories. She and Charles Card were "honored" by the people they led multiple times, celebrating their achievements within the community. Card in particular was praised by LDS President John Taylor for her efforts in Cardston. She was widowed twice, and lived to be 80 years old.

The Cards' original home still stands in Cardston, Alberta, and is now a museum. It is sometimes called "Mother Canton's Flannel Place," a reference to the material Zina Card made and used as wallpaper in her cabin.

Alberta's population of Latter-day Saint settlers reached 10,000 in 1911, and approximately 82,000 members of the LDS Church live in the region as of 2020.

Her great-grandson is Orson Scott Card, author of Ender's Game.
