= Lot Smith Cavalry Company =

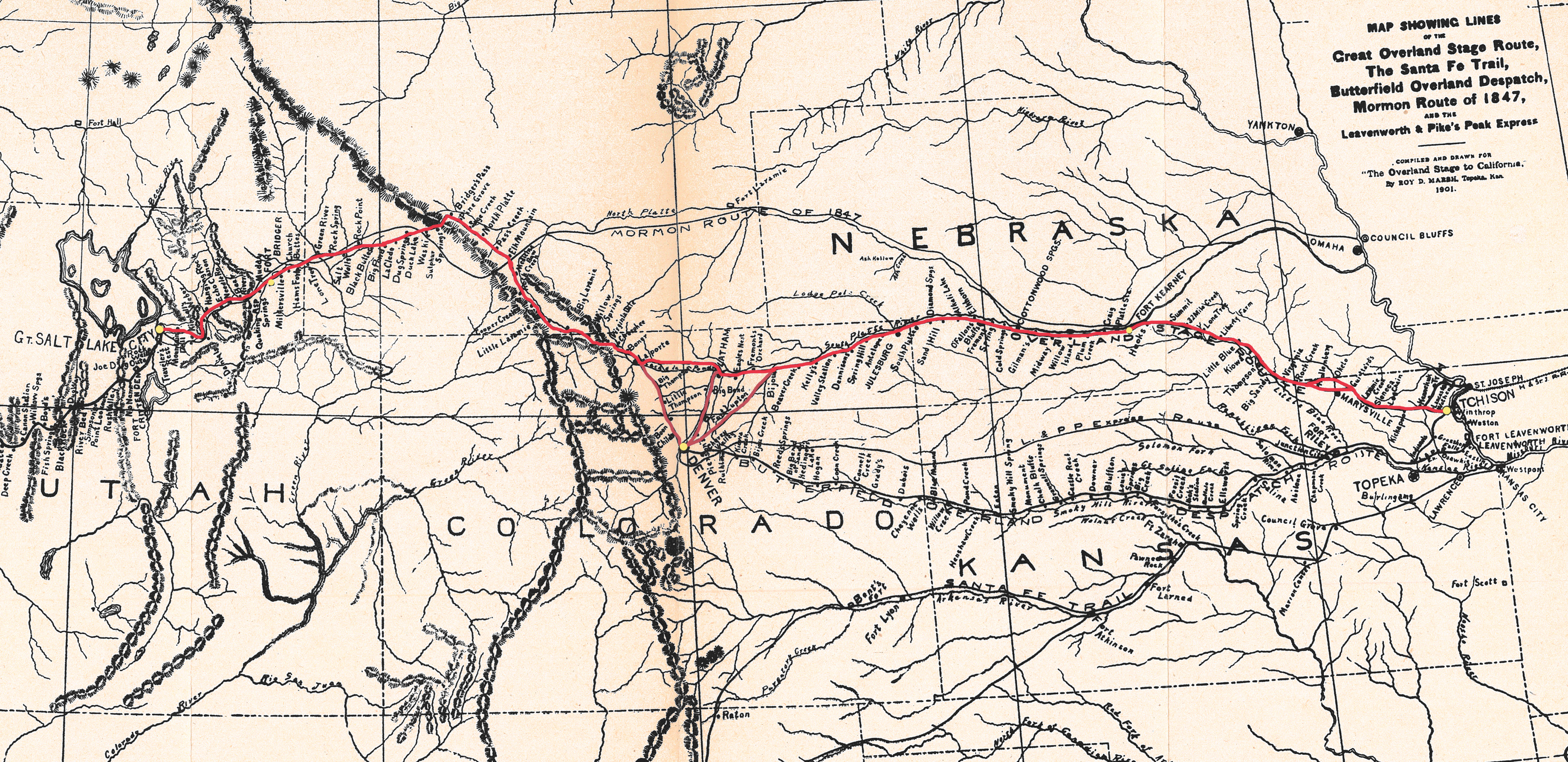
- The company patrolled along Overland Trail
- Active: 1861
- Country: United States
- Allegiance: Nauvoo Legion
- Branch: (United States) Union Army
- Type: Cavalry
- Size: 100
- Engagements: American Civil War

Commanders
- Captain: Lot Smith
- First Lieutenant: Joseph S. Rawlings

The Lot Smith Cavalry Company was a military unit that was active during the American Civil War. It was formed from volunteers from the Nauvoo Legion, Utah's territorial militia.

== History ==
The unit was founded at the request of the War Department. Telegram to Brigham Young:

Washington, April 28, 1862

Mr. Brigham Young,

Salt Lake City, Utah:

By express direction of the President of the United States you are hereby authorized to raise, arm, and equip one company of cavalry for ninety days’ service. This company will be organized as follows:

One captain, 1 first lieutenant, 1 second lieutenant, 1 first sergeant, 1 quartermaster-sergeant, 4 sergeants, 8 corporals, 2 musicians, 2 farriers, 1 saddler, 1 wagoner, and from 56 to 72 privates. The company will be employed to protect the property of the telegraph and overland mail companies in or about Independence Rock, where depredations have been committed, and will be continued in service only till the U.S. troops can reach the point where they are so much needed. It may therefore be disbanded previous to the expiration of the ninety days. It will not be employed for any offensive operations other than may grow out of the duty hereinbefore assigned to it. The officers of the company will be mustered into the U.S. service by any civil officer of the United States Government at Salt Lake City competent to administer the oath. The men will then be enlisted by the company officers. The men employed in the service above named will be entitled to receive no other than the allowances authorized by law to soldiers in the service of the United States. Until the proper staff officer for subsisting these men arrive you will please furnish subsistence for them yourself, keeping an accurate account thereof for future settlement with the United States Government.

By order of the Secretary of War:

L. Thomas, Adjutant-General.

Brigham Young replied saying:

Adjutant General Thomas, U.S.A. Washington, D.C.

Upon receipt of your telegram of April 27, I requested General Daniel H. Wells, of the Utah militia to proceed at once to raise a company of cavalry and equip and muster them into the service of the United States army for ninety days, as per your telegram. General Wells, forthwith issued the necessary orders and on the 29th day of April the commissioned officers and non-commissioned officers and privates, including teamsters, were sworn in by Chief Justice John F. Kinney, and the company went into camp adjacent to the city the same day.

Brigham Young

On the day Brigham Young agreed to the government's request, the First Presidency issued detailed instructions on April 30, 1862, regarding the role of the Lot Smith Company. They emphasized the spiritual aspect of their mission, urging the troops to acknowledge divine intervention in their efforts and to prioritize their service over financial compensation. The company was to represent the Church and foster its influence through their conduct, being exemplary in both public and private settings to earn commendation as noble citizens. The presidency also advised against gambling, drinking, and swearing, and stressed kindness toward their animals. They were tasked with improving roads to benefit not only themselves but also mail services and future travelers, highlighting the importance of maintaining effective cross-country communication. Additionally, the presidency instructed that prayers be offered twice daily to seek divine protection and guidance. They signed off their guidance with a note of solidarity, affirming their shared faith and commitment.

Ben Holladay, who managed a significant stage and mail line, expressed his gratitude to Brigham Young via telegram, promising to enhance his services once the Utah volunteers were positioned. This deployment was crucial in keeping the communication lines operational during the Civil War, an essential component of maintaining east-west connectivity, which was vulnerable to disruptions. While Holladay had financial motivations to maintain the routes, the broader sentiment among the Latter-day Saints was that their involvement was divinely inspired. This was affirmed by President Wells shortly after the enlistment, who framed the call to serve as part of a divine plan and a demonstration of their commitment to the United States, despite previous conflicts.

The military march began on May 1, 1862, and was characterized by challenges like severe snow and logistical obstacles. Despite these difficulties, the Lot Smith Company was commended for their resilience and constructive efforts along the way, such as bridge building which greatly aided travel and communication.

== See also ==
- Mormon Battalion
- Utah Territory in the American Civil War
