= Dimick B. Huntington =

Utah territory Indian interpreter

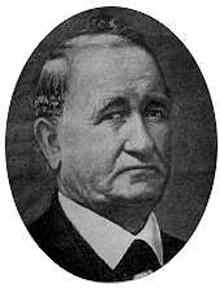
- Born: May 26, 1808
- Died: February 1, 1879 (aged 70)
- Occupation: Interpreter
- Spouse: Fanny Marie Allen
- Children: 7
- Father: William Huntington
- Military service
- Allegiance: United States
- Branch: United States Army; Nauvoo Legion
- Units: Army: Mormon Battalion; Nauvoo Legion: Nauvoo Legion Band
- Conflicts: Mexican-American War

Dimick Baker Huntington (May 26, 1808 – February 1, 1879) was a leading Indian interpreter in early Utah Territory. He commissioned a 22-foot-long missionary panorama of C. C. A. Christensen to use in his presentations of the gospel to the Native Americans in 1871. That missionary panorama is housed in the Church History Museum of the Church of Jesus Christ of Latter-day Saints.

== Biography ==
Huntington was the son of William and Zina Baker Huntington. He was born at Watertown, Jefferson County, New York. Huntington married Fanny Marie Allen on April 28, 1830, they eventually had seven children. Huntington was baptized into the Church of the Latter Day Saints on August 1, 1835, the same year as his parents.

Huntington first enters the annals of Mormon history as the first to see Joseph Smith land in Illinois after his escape from jail in Missouri. Huntington also took Smith the four miles distance to the house where Emma Smith was staying. In March 1841, Huntington was appointed one of the constables of Nauvoo, Illinois. In October 1841, Huntington brought the testimony that led to the excommunication of John A. Hicks, the elders quorum president in Nauvoo, for falsehood and schismatic conversation.

In 1842, Huntington was made coroner of Nauvoo. After Joseph Smith's death, Huntington was among those who prepared Joseph and Hyrum Smith's bodies for burial and buried them in a secret location underneath the Nauvoo House.

Huntington was a member of the Mormon Battalion. His family had come with him and they went to Pueblo, Colorado. One of Fanny's children was born there on January 1, 1847.

Huntington was one of the members of Parley P. Pratt's company that explored southern Utah in 1849. Huntington was also among the first settlers of Provo, Utah.

Huntington was the first Indian interpreter in Utah Territory. In 1855, he negotiated a peace with the Utes in the vicinity of Fillmore, Utah.

In 1857, Huntington was closely associated with teaching the gospel to many Native Americans, and kept a journal of his activities. Among other things he recorded Brigham Young ordaining Tutsegabit an elder on September 10, 1857. In 1868, Huntington was among those who negotiated the end of Utah's Black Hawk War.

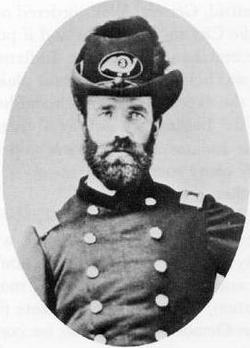
Dimick B. Huntington in his military uniform

He commissioned a 22-foot-long missionary panorama of C. C. A. Christensen, showing Bible and Book of Mormon scenes to the Native Americans in 1871. In 1873, missionaries under the leadership of George Washington Hill baptized about 100 Shoshone. Speaking to the Indians in their own language, Hill showed the missionary panorama and taught about the Bible and Book of Mormon. The Shoshone then settled on farmland north of Tremonton, Utah. The Indians later moved north to southern Idaho and named the new community Washakie, after a Shoshone chief.

In 1874, Huntington ordained Kanosh an elder in the Church of Jesus Christ of Latter-day Saints.

Huntington worked as a blacksmith and was also drum-major of the Nauvoo Legion band. He later held a similar position with a band in Salt Lake City.

For the last several years of his life, Huntington served as patriarch of the Salt Lake Stake.

== See also ==
- Battle Creek, Utah
- Battle at Fort Utah

== Sources ==
- R. Devan Jensen. Philo Dibble's Dream of 'a Gallery in Zion.' Journal of Mormon History 44, no. 4 (2018): 19–39.
- Orson F. Whitney. History of Utah. p. 209-211.
- Andrew Jenson. Latter-day Saint Biographical Encyclopedia. Vol. 4, p. 748.
- B. H. Roberts. Comprehensive History of the Church. Vol. 3, p. 479.
