= Utah Territorial Militia =

Territorial militia for Utah Territory from 1852 to 1887

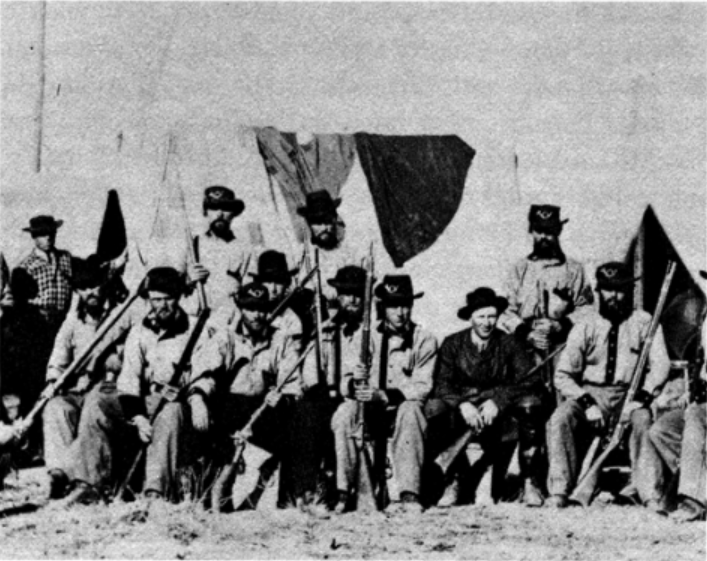
- Officers and troops of the Third Regiment of Nauvoo Legion as reformed in Utah.
- Active: 1852–1887
- Disbanded: 1887
- Country: United States; State of Deseret (1857–1858)
- Allegiance: Utah Territory
- Type: Territorial Militia
- Role: Territorial Militia
- Engagements: Utah War; American Civil War; Morrisite War

Commanders
- Notable commanders: Brigham Young Daniel H. Wells Hosea Stout Robert T. Burton Stephen S. Harding William H. Dame Dimick B. Huntington

The Utah Territorial Militia, also known as the Nauvoo Legion, was the territorial Militia for the Mormon forces in the Territory of Utah in the United States.

== History ==
A predecessor known as the Nauvoo Legion was formed as a state-authorized militia of the city of Nauvoo, Illinois, United States and was active February 4, 1841 until January 1845.

=== State of Deseret Territorial Militia ===
In 1847, Mormon leader Brigham Young reformed the remnants of Nauvoo Legion into a fully functional paramilitary force, which was organized into sub-units for each of the Utah counties as the Deseret Territorial Militia akin to their contemporaries the Army of the Republic of Texas and the Texas Rangers.

=== Walker Indian War ===
In the 1849 conflicts with Native Americans in Utah County, such as the attack at Battle Creek, Utah, and Battle at Fort Utah, foreshadowed the 1853–1854 Walker War between the Nauvoo Legion and Indians led by Chief Walkara ("Walker"). Twenty Mormon militiamen and many Native Americans died in the Walker War.

=== Utah War ===
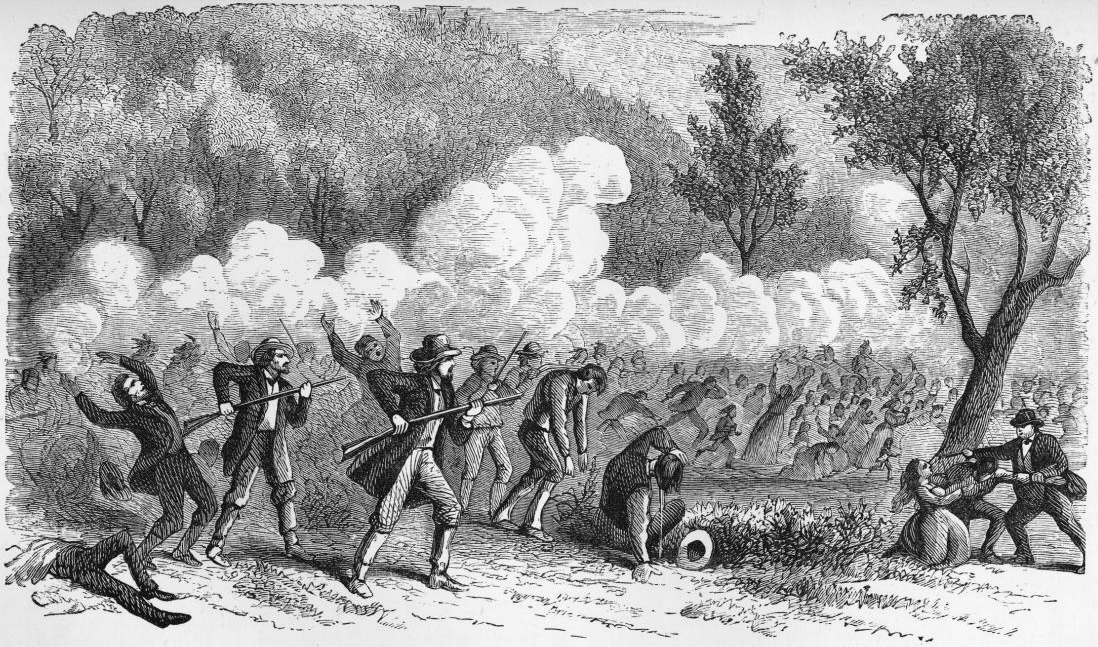
The Utah Territorial Militia was known as the Nauvoo Legion and accused of perpetrating the 1857 Mountain Meadows Massacre in which 120–140 non-Mormon settlers were murdered.

The Nauvoo Legion was called up again in the Utah War against Federal troops entering Utah in the "Utah Expedition" from 1857 to 1858. They employed tactics of supply destruction and avoided direct fighting. The militia clashed with the United States government during the Utah War. With strength of around 6,000 personnel, segments of the northern contingent mobilized to impede the advance of Albert Sidney Johnston's army into Utah. This army was sent in by president James Buchanan to put down the rebellion by the people of Utah, as they called it. Both sides stopped engagements after agreement was reached permitting the army's passage through Salt Lake City, establishing Camp Floyd.

After this conflict, the Federal government appointed Utah's territorial governor, and the force was allowed to exist at the command of the governor. It, however, was not as cooperative in imposing the colonial regime as federal authorities would have liked.

==== Mountain Meadows Massacre ====
Local commanders and members of the Iron County, Utah Territorial Militia, overcome with suspicion and war hysteria, perpetrated the Mountain Meadows Massacre against a group of wagon trains travelling from Arkansas to California in September. At this point Daniel H. Wells was the chief military commander of the militia. It was also under the auspices of the militia that the groups of men were organized who were instructed to burn down Salt Lake City and other parts of northern Utah should the invading army try to take up residence.

=== American Civil War ===
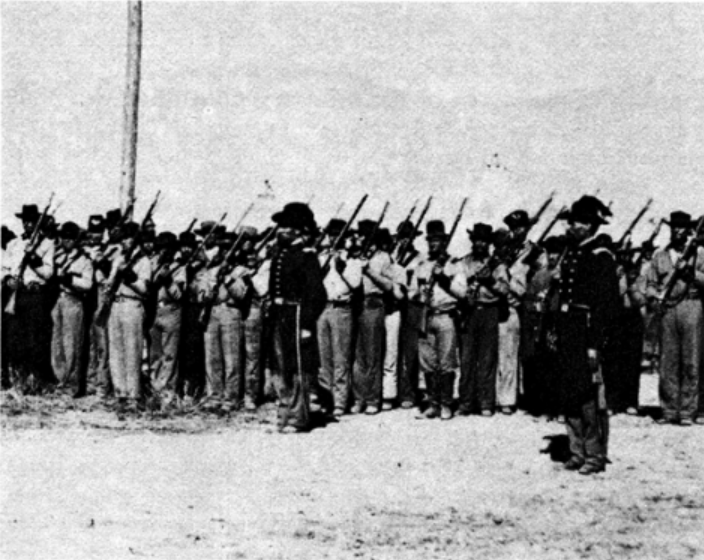
Officers and troops of the Third Regiment of Nauvoo Legion as reformed in Utah.

During the American Civil War, federal troops either were withdrawn from Utah, or in many cases left to join the rebellion, Johnston who had led the invading federal army being among the latter group. The Federal government made a reconciliatory approach to Brigham Young, requesting his help. With his permission, two units of the reorganized Nauvoo Legion were gainfully employed by the United States to protect western mail and telegraph lines from Indian attacks in what is today Utah and Wyoming, but saw no meaningful action. Neither the Legion nor any other Mormon troops participated in the main theaters of the war, and the Legion's involvement ended in 1862 after Congress had passed the Morrill Anti-Bigamy Act.

=== Utah Black Hawk War ===
The final use of the militia was in Utah's Black Hawk War 1865–1872 when over 2,500 troops were dispatched against Indians led by Antonga Black Hawk. (Antonga Black Hawk was a Ute and has no connection to the Illinois Sauk chief Black Hawk of the 1830s.) In 1870 the Utah Territorial governor, J. Wilson Shaffer forced the Legion inactive unless he ordered otherwise. Federal troops dispatched in response to the 1870 Ghost Dance ensured Shaffer's order was enforced.

== Transition to Utah National Guard ==
The Utah Territorial Militia never gathered again, and the 1887 Edmunds-Tucker Act permanently disbanded it. In 1894, in anticipation of statehood, the non-sectarian Utah National Guard was organized as Utah's official state militia.

== Uniforms, weapons, and equipment ==
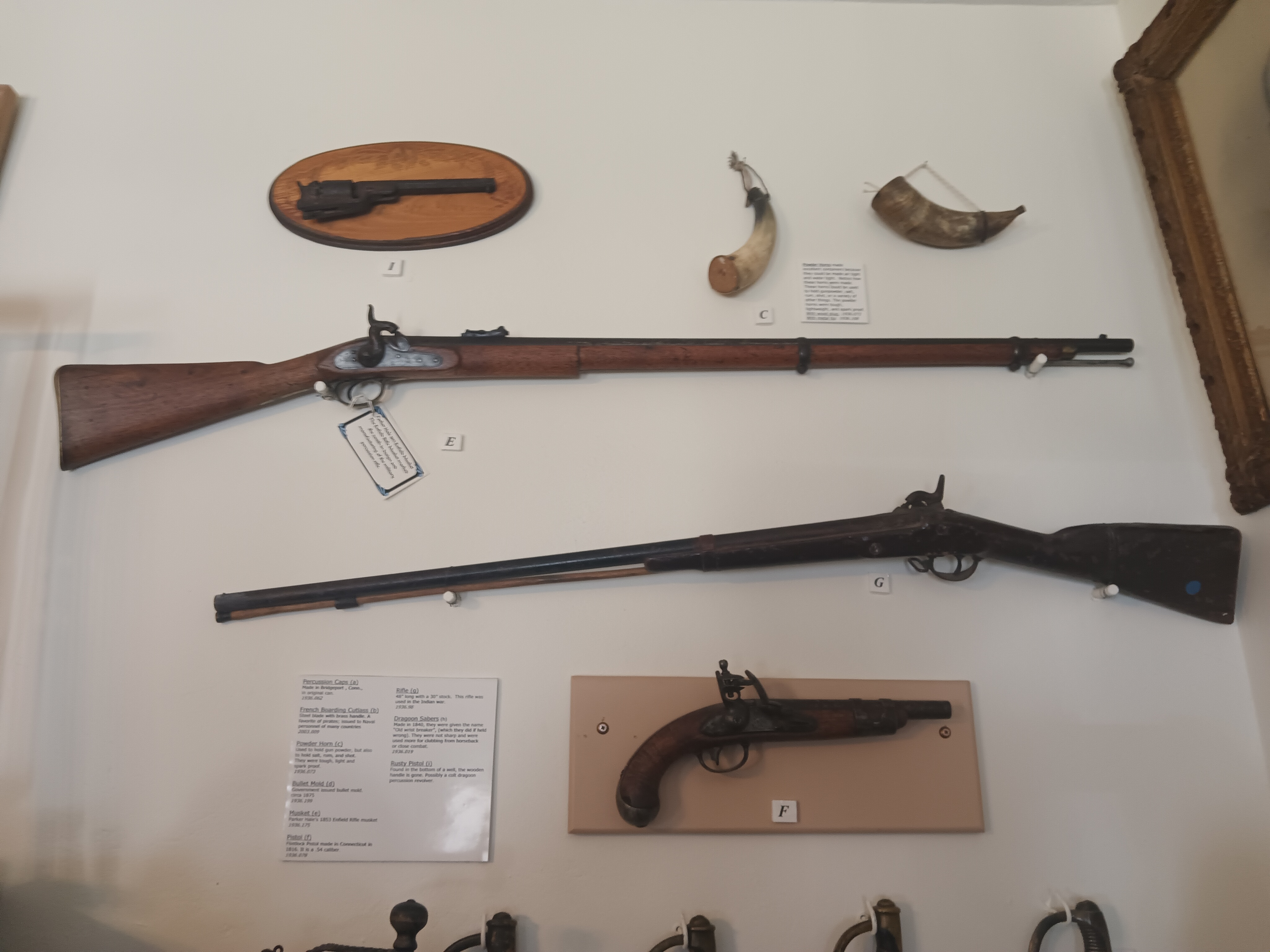
Weapons used by the Utah Territorial Militia, located in Richfield Utah

A small artillery piece, an 1841 12-pound mountain howitzer was issued to the territorial militia. It arrived in Salt Lake in 1852. Today the mountain howitzer is on display in the Fort Douglas museum in Salt Lake City. The 4 pound Spanish bronze is in the Mormon Battalion Visitor Center in San Diego, Calif. There is a copy of it in front of the center. The iron Spanish 2 and 6 pound cannons remain in storage in Salt Lake City.

When the Mormon Battalion was enlisted in July, 1846, about 450 Model 1816 muskets and later Type III were issued to the infantry. As standard issue for the state militia. Five 1803 Harpers Ferry rifles were issued to the hunters of company A. Different significant number of Kentucky rifles and Deringer M1817 rifle were utilized. Records for the weapons issued to the other companies are missing. After the men were released from service in 1847, they headed for home, many stopping for temporary employment at Sutter's Fort. 6 of their group built the mill at Coloma, where gold was discovered. Many of them took time to pan for gold and they were quite successful. When they resumed their journey home, they bought two cannons from Sutter, a four pounder and a six pounder. These were thought at that time to have come from Sutter's purchase of the Russian Fort Ross and to have been either Russian or French cannons. This caused them to be lost after the deaths of the battalion members, because the source of the cannons was not written. Sutter wrote a letter to the pioneer society in the 1870s where he said that his cannons, except for one Russian 4-pounder, which he donated to a museum in San Francisco, were all Spanish guns. In 2001 three Spanish guns were identified in the LDS Church storage facility in Salt Lake City. The bronze 4-pounder was found to have the crest of King Carlos 3 of Spain. A 6-pound iron cannon, probably the other battalion cannon and a smaller, but similar, 2 pound cannon were in the warehouse. The provenance of the 2-pounder is currently unknown. All three Spanish cannons, which were brought to Salt Lake City on pallets, were mounted on carriages copied from the mountain howitzer carriage, in preparation for the Utah disturbances, the Nauvoo Legion's arsenal consisted of approximately 2,364 rifles (primarily legacy hunting models, .54 Mississippi, and Harmonica gun), 1,159 muskets (a combination of .69 smoothbore variants), 99 pistols, 295 revolvers (including Colt and local productions), 414 sword (possibly Model 1840 cavalry sabers), and four stationary antique cannons. This equipment was a heterogeneous collection of personal arms, materiel salvaged from the 1846 Nauvoo evacuation, and locally manufactured firearms. Consequently, the Mormon defense against Johnston's army in 1857, the federal forces maintained a significant technological and tactical superiority through the deployment of new rifled musket alongside both side testing the Sharps model, which the Mormon militia could not effectively counter but use hit-&-run tactic.

=== Flags ===
The flags carried by the militia were usually made by locals of the community. They often contained religious symbols and mottos of their faith. Most of their flag were based on the American flag, with some bearing an eagle or beehive.

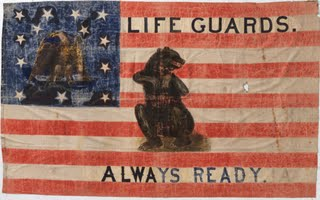
The alleged Nauvoo Legion Flag. It is not known if it was used in Nauvoo, Illinois, or in the later Nauvoo Legion Utah period. It may have also been used by the Mormon Battalion in the U.S. Army during the Mexican–American War (1846–1847).

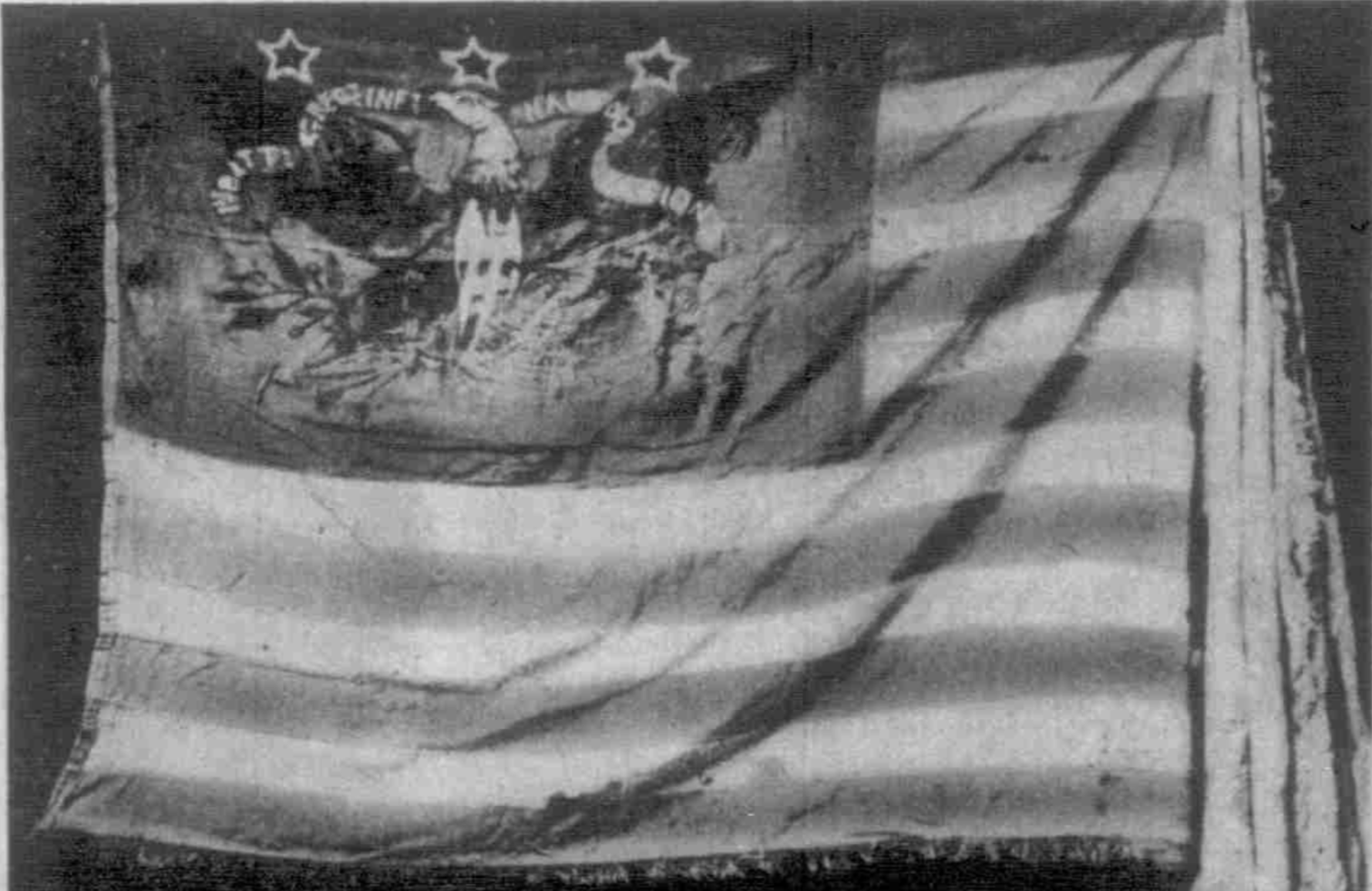
The flag carried by the Third Regiment of Nauvoo Legion from 1840–1866. It was carried by Mark Lindsey during the Blackhawk War.

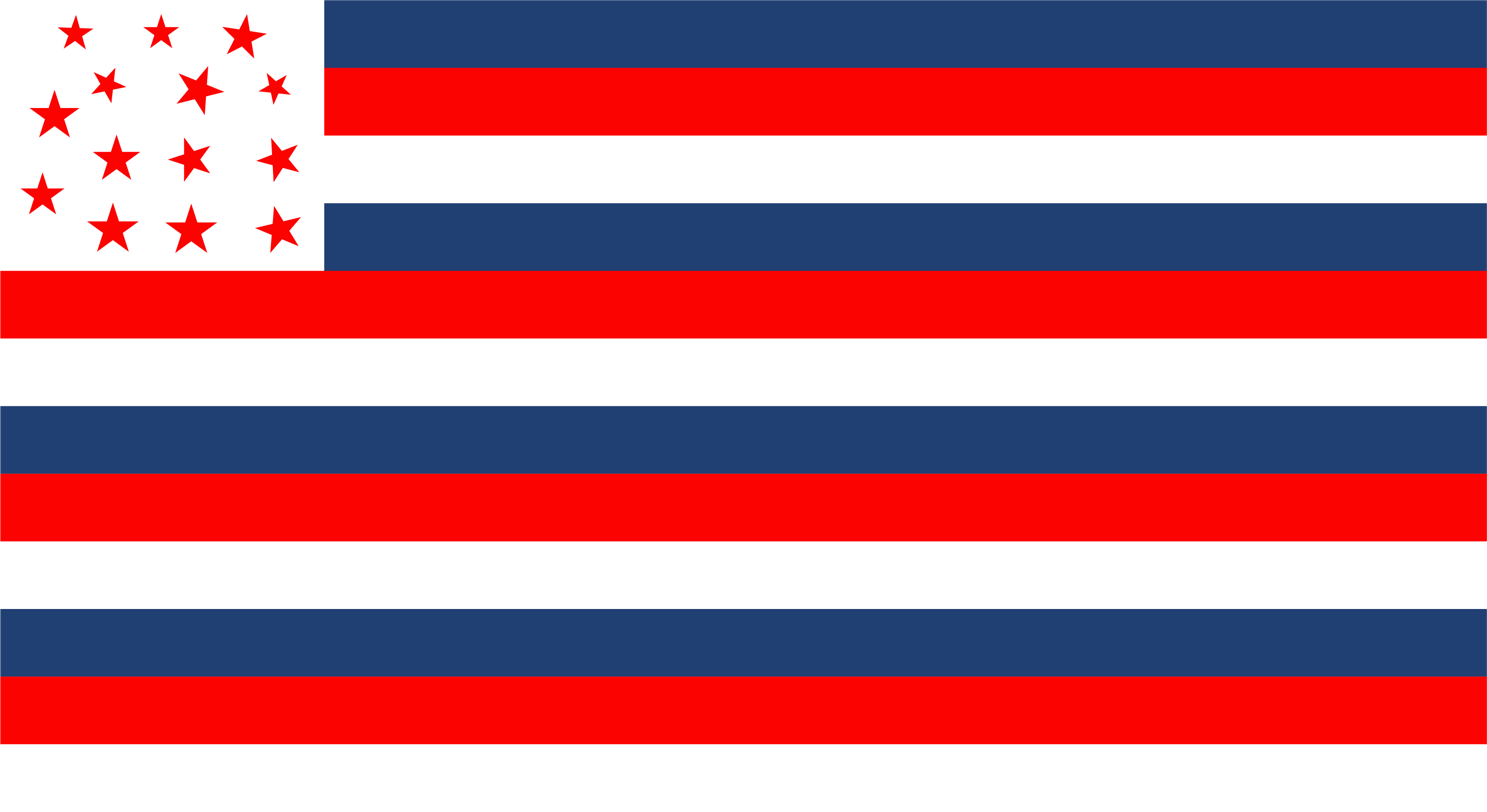
Remake of the flag given to the Salt Creek militia by Edward H. William

Digital reconstruction of the flag carried by the Kaysville militia, 1856

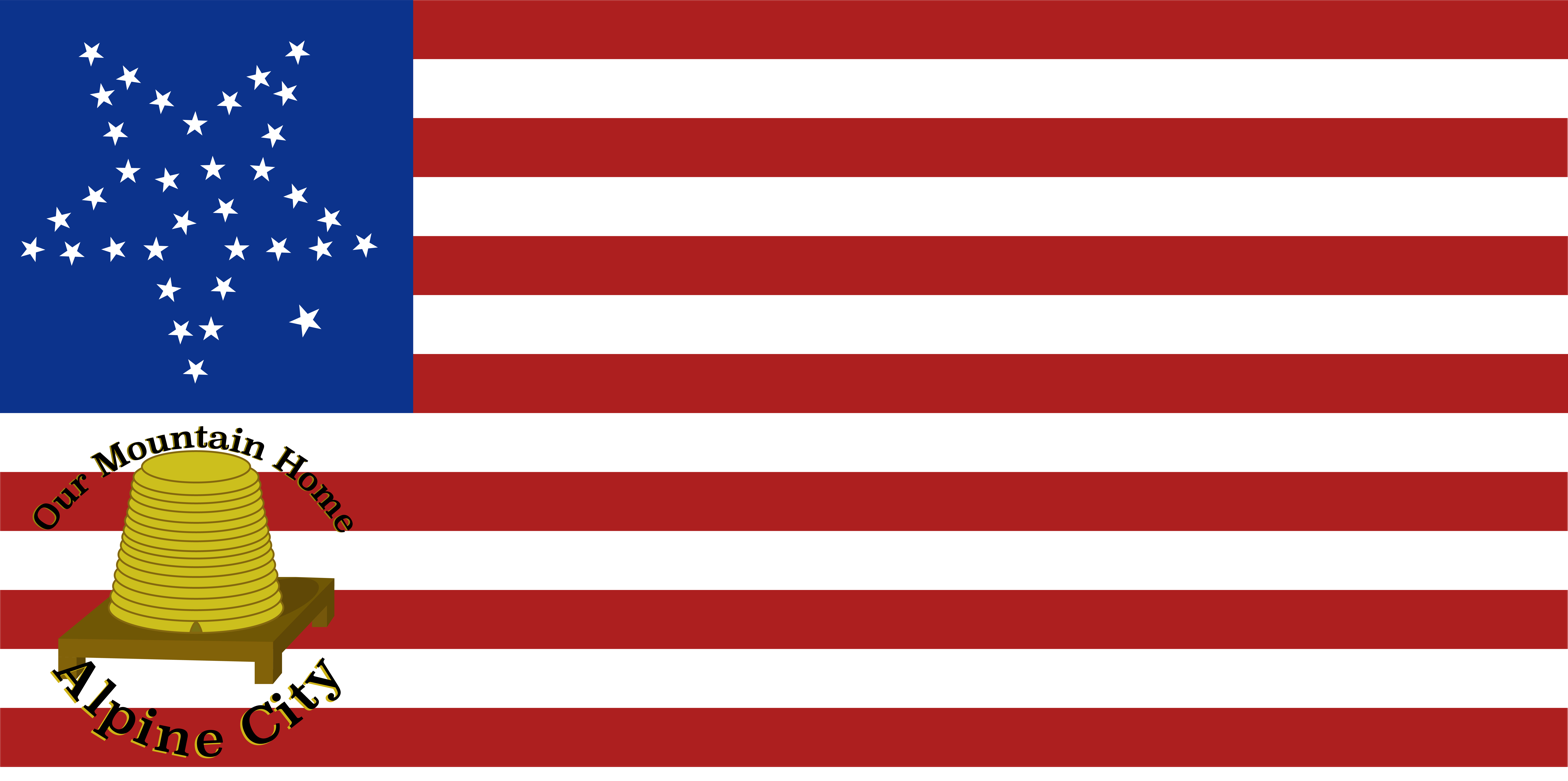
Digital reconstruction of the flag used by the Alpine militia in the 1860s

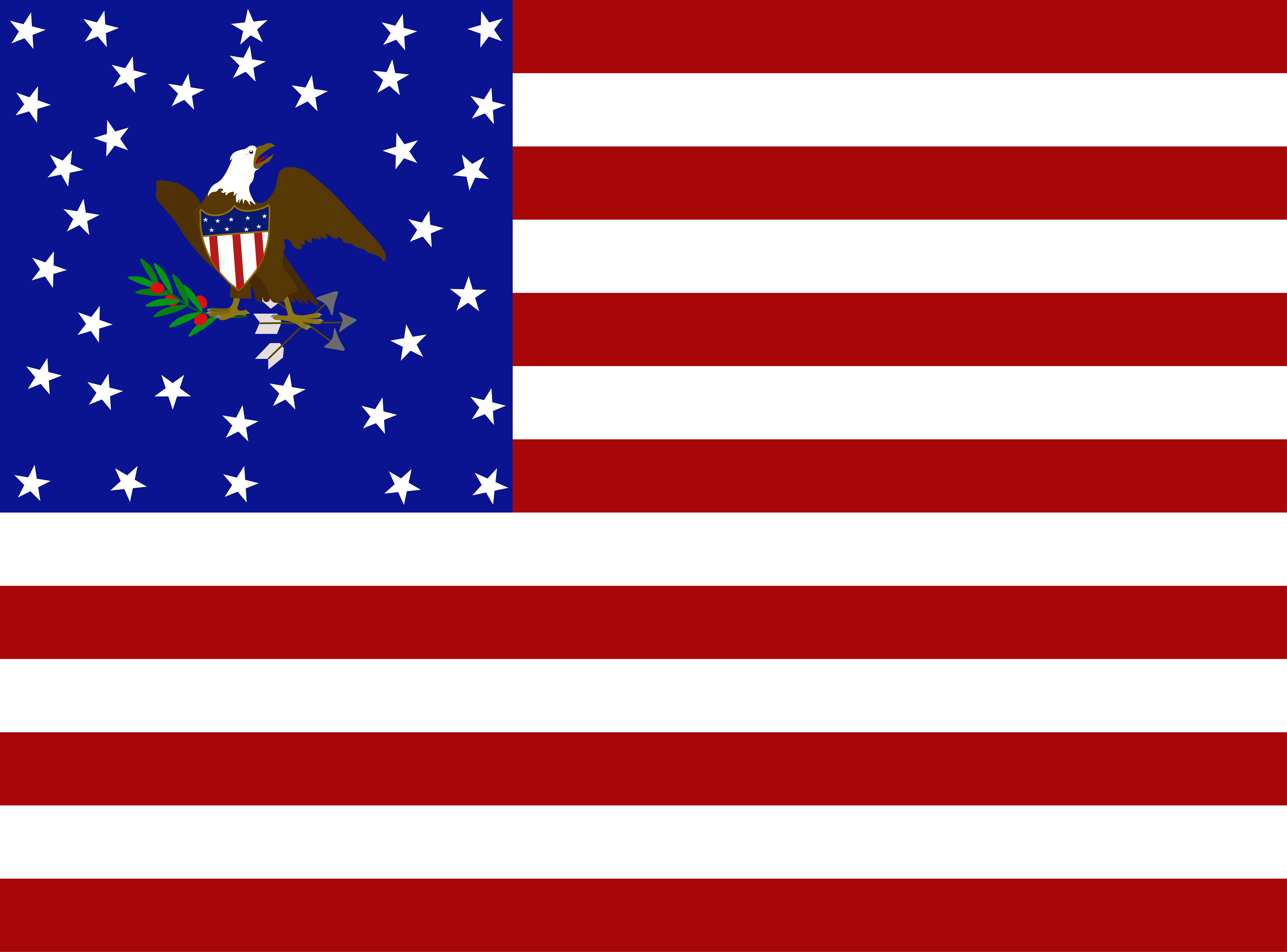
Digital reconstruction of the flag carried by the Cache Valley Dragoons, 1861

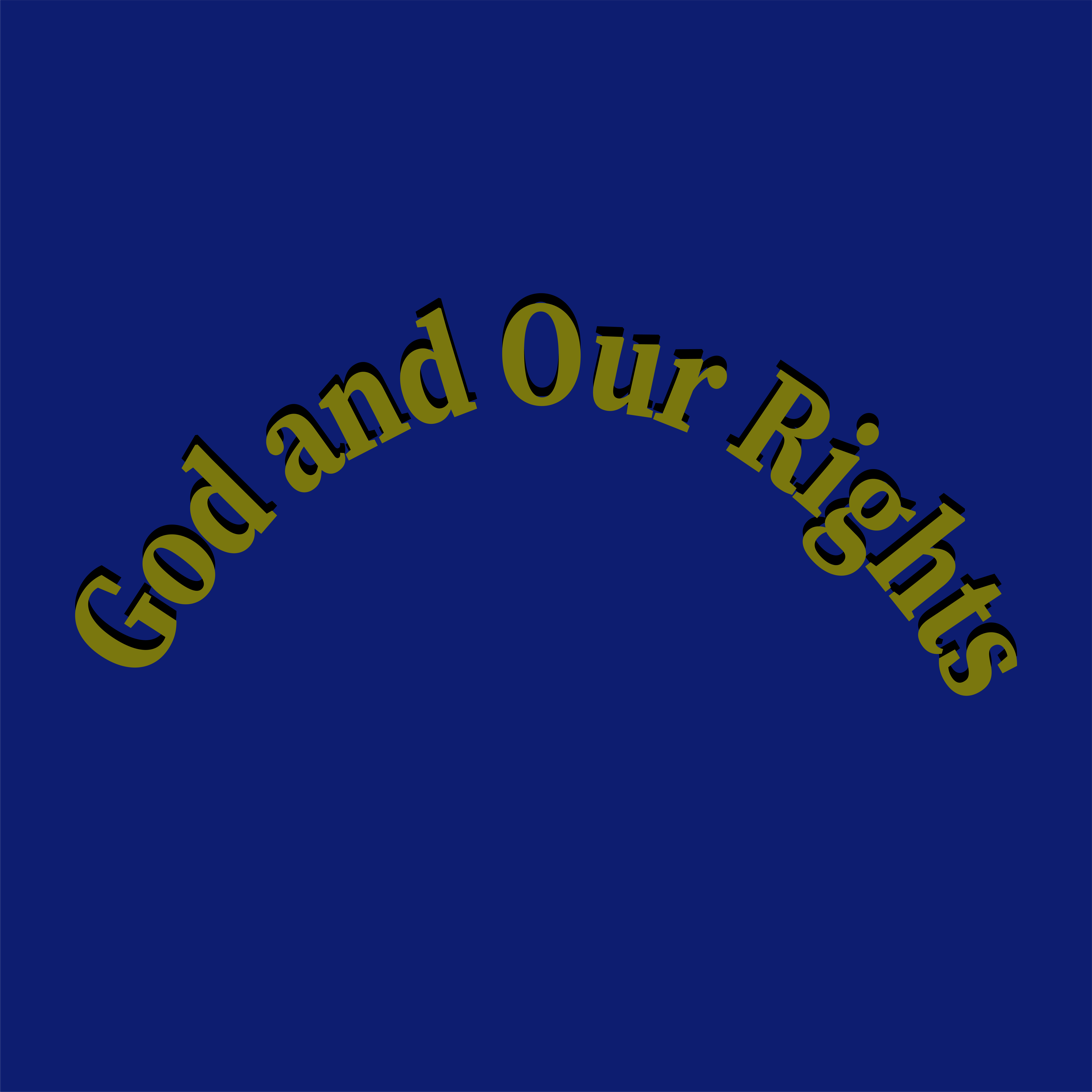
Digital reconstruction of the flag flown by Nauvoo Legion in 1864

== See also ==
- Morrisite War

Preceded by Nauvoo Legion (Illinois State Militia); 1840–1845	Utah Territorial Militia; 1852–1887	Succeeded by Utah National Guard; 1887–today
