= Descendants of Brigham Young =

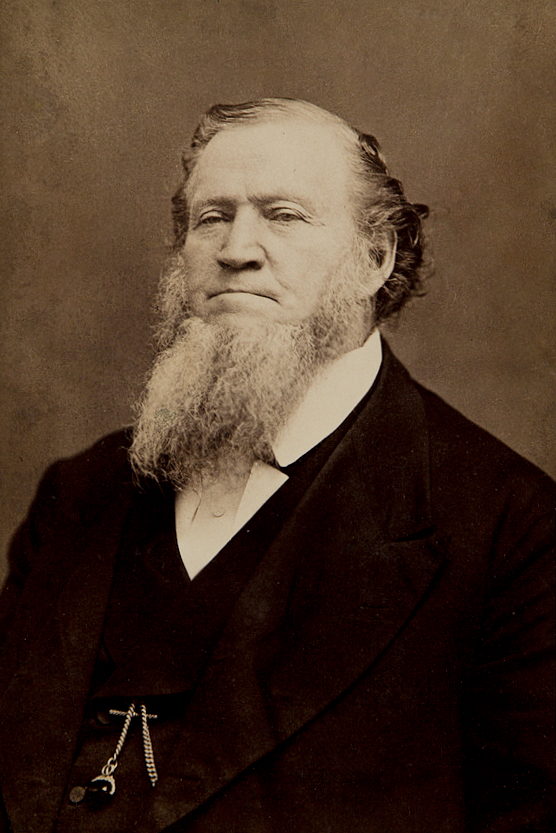
Brigham Young c. 1870

Brigham Young (June 1, 1801 – August 29, 1877) was an American leader in the Latter Day Saint movement and a settler of the Western United States. He was the President of the Church of Jesus Christ of Latter-day Saints (LDS Church) from 1847 until his death in 1877. He founded Salt Lake City and he served as the first governor of the Utah Territory. Young also led the foundings of the precursors to the University of Utah and Brigham Young University.

Young was a polygamist, marrying a total of 55 wives, 54 of them after he converted to Mormonism. By the time of his death, Young had 56 children by 16 of his wives; 46 of his children reached adulthood.

In 1902, 25 years after Young's death, The New York Times established that Young's direct descendants numbered more than 1,000.

In 2016 Young was estimated to have around 30,000 descendants.

== Notable descendants ==
The following are notable descendants of Brigham Young.

Name	Relationship to Brigham Young	Wife of Brigham Young descended from	Notes
Emma L.G. Bowen	Granddaughter	Lucy Bigelow	An opera singer and later the wife of Albert E. Bowen, a member of the Quorum of the Twelve Apostles. She was often referred to as Lucy Gates and after her marriage as Lucy Gates Bowen or Lucy Bowen.
Zina C. Brown	Granddaughter	Zina D. H. Young	Wife of Hugh B. Brown, a member of the LDS Church's Quorum of the Twelve Apostles and First Presidency and a Canadian military officer.
Zola G. Brown	Great-granddaughter	Zina D. H. Young	Daughter of Hugh B. Brown and Zina Card Brown. Zola was the first wife of FLDS Church president Rulon Jeffs
Orson S. Card	great-great-grandson	Zina D. H. Young	Novelist, critic, public speaker, essayist and columnist. He writes in several genres but is known best for the science fiction novel Ender's Game (1985).
Zina Y. Card	Daughter	Zina D. H. Young	Wife of Charles O. Card who founded the first Mormon settlement in Canada - Cardston, Alberta - and who was referred to as "Canada's Brigham Young."
John Willard Clawson	Grandson	Mary Ann Angell	Portrait painter
Hugh W. Dougall	Grandson	Clarissa Ross	Hymnwriter; Among hymns by Dougall are "Jesus of Nazareth, Savior and King" and the music to "Come Unto Him" and "The Bridge Builder."
Maria Y. Dougall	Daughter	Clarissa Ross	Became First Counselor in the general presidency of the Young Women
Susa Y. Gates	Daughter	Lucy Bigelow	A prominent women's rights activist in Utah.
Sandra Tanner	great-great-granddaughter	Mary Ann Angell	Mormon critic
Sally Young Kanosh	Adopted daughter	Clarissa Caroline Decker	Bannock slave bought by Young's brother-in-law and given to the Young family. Worked in the Lion House to feed her adopted family. Later married Kanosh to form an alliance between Young and Kanosh.
Leah D. Widtsoe	Granddaughter	Lucy Bigelow	A leading expert in home economics and wife of apostle John A. Widtsoe.
B. Morris Young	Son	Margaret Pierce	One of the founders of the Young Men's Mutual Improvement Association (YMMIA), the predecessor to the LDS Church's Young Men organization. From 1885 to the 1900s, B. Morris publicly performed as a cross-dressing singer under the pseudonym Madam Pattirini.
Bob Young	Great-great-great-grandson	Lucy D. Young	An Emmy nominated broadcast journalist, author, and former mayor of Augusta, Georgia. He also served a presidential appointment by George W. Bush on the Advisory Council on Historic Preservation. As of 2013, Young was serving as the president and chief executive officer (CEO) of the Southeastern Natural Sciences Academy.
Brigham Young, Jr.	Son	Mary Ann Angell	Ordained an LDS Church apostle by his father. He served as president of the LDS Church's Quorum of the Twelve Apostles from 1899 until his death.
Don C. Young	Son	Emily Dow Partridge	An architect, landscape architect and designer from 1879 to circa 1935. He was the official LDS Church Architect from 1887 until 1893. After 1893, Young practiced privately, with the LDS Church as a frequent client. A preponderance of his work centered on church commissions, or commissions offered him by extended Young family members, or other church members and friends.
John W. Young	Son	Mary Ann Angell	Ordained an LDS Church apostle by his father. He is one of the few Latter-day Saints in history to have been ordained to the office of apostle without ever becoming a member of the church's Quorum of the Twelve Apostles or the First Presidency.
Joseph A. Young	Son	Mary Ann Angell	Ordained an LDS Church apostle by his father. He is one of the few Latter-day Saints in history to have been ordained to the office of apostle without ever becoming a member of the church's Quorum of the Twelve Apostles or the First Presidency.
Kimball Young	Grandson	Harriet Elizabeth Cook	Sociologist and president of the American Sociological Association in 1945.
Mahonri Young	Grandson	Margaret Alley	Sculptor; Two of his works, the This Is The Place Monument and the Seagull Monument are featured prominently in Salt Lake City, Utah.
Waldemar Young	Grandson	Margaret Alley	Screenwriter
Richard W. Young	Grandson	Mary Ann Angell	U.S. Army Brigadier General and an Associate Justice of the Supreme Court of the Philippines;
Steve Young	Great-great-great-grandson	Emily Dow Partridge	Pro Football Hall of Fame quarterback, Super Bowl XXIX MVP, 2x NFL MVP (1992, 1994).
William H. Young	Grandson	Mary Ann Angell	In 1903, William was convicted of the "Pulitzer Murder" in New York City and was sentenced to life imprisonment.

== See also ==
- List of Brigham Young's wives
