= List of Brigham Young's wives =

Brigham Young (1801–1877), second president of the Church of Jesus Christ of Latter-day Saints (LDS Church), married 56 wives during his lifetime as part of religious polygamy termed "plural marriage" in the Latter Day Saint movement. Mormon polygamy was started by movement founder Joseph Smith. By the time of his death, Young had 57 children by 16 of his wives; 46 of his children reached adulthood. In 1902, only 25 years after Young's death, The New York Times wrote that Young's direct descendants numbered more than 1,000.

== Wives and family ==
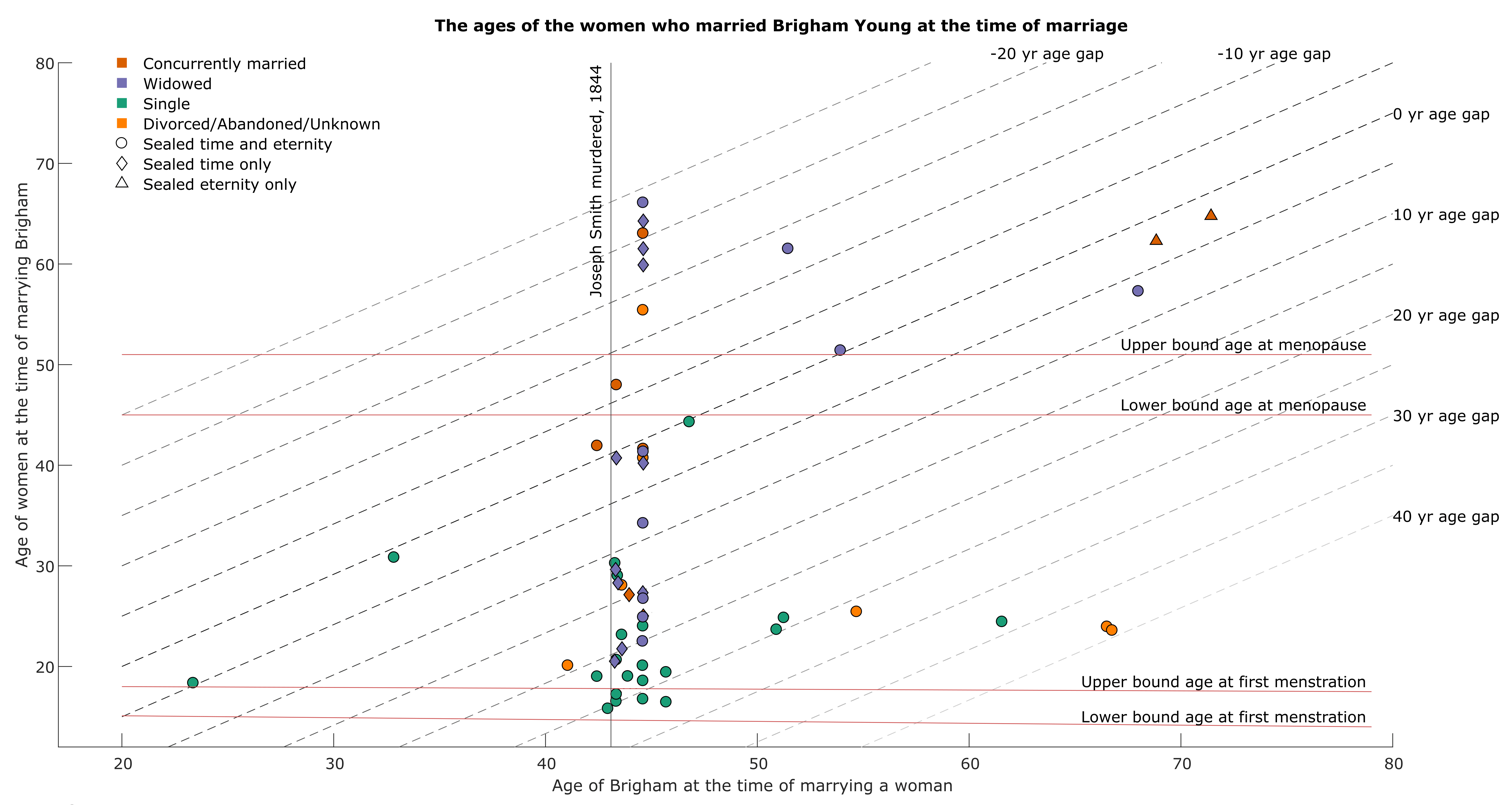
Timeline of Brigham Young's marriages

Sources have varied on the number of Young's wives due to differences in what observers have considered to be a "wife". It has been confirmed that there were fifty-six women that Young was sealed to during his lifetime. While the majority of the sealings were "for eternity" (i.e., in the afterlife), some were "for time only" (until death). In both of these types of sealings, a conjugal relationship could exist, though Young reportedly did not enter into conjugal relationships with at least six of his wives. Young did not live with a number of his wives or publicly hold them out as wives, which has led to confusion on numbering. A book published in 1887 gives brief biographical sketches of twenty-six wives (with pictures of twenty).

Of his fifty-six wives, twenty-one had never been married before; seventeen were widows; six were divorced; six had living husbands; and the marital status of six others is unknown. Nine of his wives had previously been plural wives of Joseph Smith, and Young was sealed to them as a proxy for Smith.

Four of his wives were sealed to him during Smith's lifetime, sixteen after Smith's death but before the completion of the Nauvoo Temple, nineteen in the Nauvoo Temple, four during his journey from Nauvoo to the Salt Lake Valley, and eleven in Utah. One of Young's spouses Zina Huntington was married to multiple men at the same time, and was pregnant from another living man when she married Young in a polyandrous marriage.

At the time of Young's death, twenty of his wives had predeceased him, he was divorced from ten, and twenty-three survived him, with the status of four unknown. In his will, Young shared his estate with the seventeen surviving wives who had lived with him; the six surviving non-conjugal wives were not mentioned in the will. A number of women were sealed to him posthumously, but this number is also highly debated, as various sealing records from this time are incomplete or missing.

=== Public image ===
During Young's lifetime, there was a lot of public speculation as to the total number of his wives and children. Estimates in newspapers ranged anywhere from forty to two hundred, and Young often refrained to comment on these estimates, whether to confirm or deny them. Artemus Ward, a well-known comedian at the time, shared a speculation of his own after a journey to Utah: "I have somewhere stated that Brigham Young is said to have eighty wives. I hardly think he has so many... I undertook to count his long stockings on the clothes-line in the back yard, one day, and I used up the multiplication table in less than half an hour."

Eighteen of Young's wives and their children traveled to Utah with the Brigham Young Company in 1848. Young would often attend cultural events and public gatherings with his wives, usually only one, and his children. Near the end of his life, Amelia Folsom (m. 1863) would become his most significant female companion, and would often accompany Young to dances and to the theater, as well as on tours of the Latter-day Saint settlements. He was a very prominent public figure in Utah, as well as in other LDS communities, and thought it very important for himself and his family to be well-educated in the arts and culture. Young wanted to make his home a model which others could emulate, and is reported by his children to have been a loving, caring, and concerned husband and father.

== Living arrangements ==
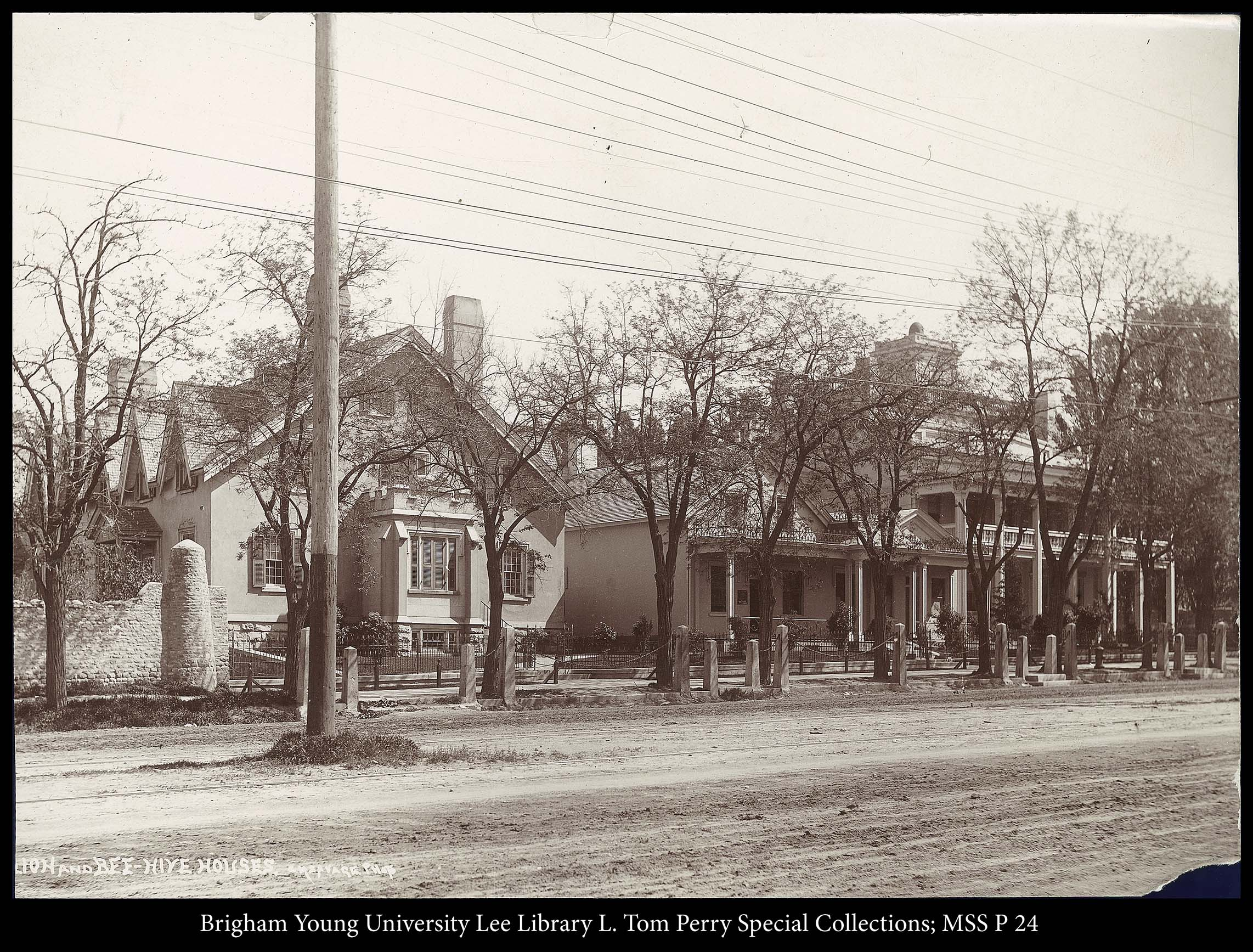
A front view showing the Lion House (left) and Beehive House (far right), circa 1856

In 1856, Young built the Lion House to accommodate his sizable family. This building remains a Salt Lake City landmark, together with the Beehive House, another Brigham Young family home built in 1854. Young primarily resided in the Beehive House with his wife Mary Ann Angel, but would gather together the entire family each evening at the Lion House for prayer and dinner. Angell later chose to move into the nearby White House sometime after 1860. Before Young's death he also had the Gardo House built as a guest house across the street from the others, which would have Amelia Folsom (m. 1863) as its primary resident. The Young household also had various servants, including the adopted Bannock girl Sally Young Kanosh, and Isaac and Jane Manning James. A contemporary of Young wrote: "It was amusing to walk by Brigham Young's big house, a long rambling building with innumerable doors. Each wife has an establishment of her own, consisting of parlor, bedroom, and a front door, the key of which she keeps in her pocket".

Within the Young household there was an arranged cooperative effort among the wives and children. Many wives served in particular roles, such as Zina Huntington (m. 1846), who served as the family's midwife, and Naamah Carter (m. 1846), who took charge of the Lion House family meals. Young's children were taught in the basement of the Lion House by Harriet Cook (m. 1843), until the construction of Young's own schoolhouse in 1865 and the subsequent hiring of a full-time teacher. Young also maintained a recreation room outfitted with a stage for variety shows and theatrical productions, as well as a long porch to serve as a gymnasium. He kept teachers in order to instruct the children in physical activities such as fencing, gymnastics, and dance. A family swimming pool was also constructed east of the Beehive House, which was occasionally used for baptisms.

== Chart of wives ==
List of women whose sealings to Young have been confirmed with evidence.

No.	Marriage date and Young's age at marriage	Portrait	Name, lifespan, and age at marriage	Wife's status at marriage	Type of union	Children	Notes
1	October 8, 1824 (aged 23)		Miriam Angeline Works (1806–1832), aged 18 at marriage	First marriage	Civil, sealed for eternity (posthumous)	2 with Young	Died in September 1832 from consumption, just a few months after she and Young were baptized.
2	February 1834 (aged 32)		Mary Ann Angell (1803–1882), aged 30 at marriage	First marriage	Civil, sealed for time and eternity	6 with Young	This was not a plural marriage, as Young was a widower at the time. Mother of Brigham Young Jr., John Willard Young and Joseph Angell Young.
3	June 17, 1842 (aged 41)		Lucy Ann Decker (1822–1890), aged 20 at marriage	Still married to husband William Seeley, whom she had married at the age of fourteen	Sealed for time and eternity	7 with Young, 3 with Seeley	First plural wife of Brigham Young. She and Young had seven children, in addition to her three from her marriage to Seeley.
4	November 2, 1843 (aged 42)		Augusta Adams (1802–1886), aged 40 at marriage	Married to non-Mormon Henry Cobb (divorced in 1847).	Sealed for time and eternity	None with Young, 8 with Cobb	Left Boston with Young in September 1843, leaving behind her husband and most of her children. Young later married her son James Cobb's ex-wife, Mary Van Cott Cobb (m. 1868). Grandmother of architect Henry Ives Cobb.
5	November 2, 1843 (aged 42)		Harriet Elizabeth Cook (1824–1898), aged 19 at marriage	First marriage	Sealed for time and eternity	1 with Young	Initially stayed behind in Nauvoo with her and Young's infant son, before joining him at Winter Quarters in 1847.
6	May 8, 1844 (aged 42)		Clarissa Caroline Decker (1828–1889), aged 15 at marriage	First marriage	Sealed for time and eternity	5 with Young	Sister of Lucy Ann Decker (m. 1842). One of three women to be part of the first pioneer company traveling to the Salt Lake Valley in 1847. She adopted Sally, a young Bannock girl who had been captured and sold to Charles Decker by a slave trader.
7	September 1844 (aged 43)		Emily Dow Partridge (1824–1899), aged 20 at marriage	Plural widow of Joseph Smith	Sealed for time	7 with Young	Daughter of Edward Partridge. Sealed to Joseph Smith for eternity and Young for life. Mother of Don Carlos Young.
8	September 10, 1844 (aged 43)		Clarissa Ross (1814–1857), aged 30 at marriage	First marriage	Sealed for time and eternity	4 with Young	Stepdaughter of Isaac Chase, a good friend of Young. Mother of Maria Young Dougall and Willard Young.
9	September 19, 1844 (aged 43)		Louisa Beaman (1815–1850), aged 29 at marriage	Plural widow of Joseph Smith	Sealed for time	5 with Young	Sealed to Joseph Smith for eternity and to Young for life.
10	October 3, 1844 (aged 43)		Eliza R. Snow (1804–1887), aged 40 at marriage	Plural widow of Joseph Smith	Sealed for time	None	Sealed to Joseph Smith for eternity and to Young for life. The sister of Lorenzo Snow, the fifth president of the LDS Church. Snow was a prominent figure in the church and the second general president of the Relief Society.
11	October 3, 1844 (aged 43)		Elizabeth Fairchild (1828–1910), aged 16 at marriage	First marriage (later divorced)	Sealed for time and eternity	None with Young, 3 with later husbands	Obtained an official certificate of divorce from Young in 1855 after two remarriages.
12	October 8, 1844 (aged 43)		Clarissa Blake (1796–1863), aged 48 at marriage	Widow of Edmund Morse; Married to Mormon husband Lyman Homiston at the time of her sealing to Young	Sealed for time and eternity	None	Slighted by Young upon his departure from Nauvoo. Later traveled to Utah with her husband to reconcile with Young and was rebuffed.
13	October 9, 1844 (aged 43)		Rebecca Greenleaf Holman (1824–1849), aged 20 at marriage	First marriage	Sealed for time and eternity	None	Died on the journey to the Salt Lake Valley and is buried in Council Bluffs, Iowa.
14	October 10, 1844 (aged 43)		Diana Chase (1827–1886), aged 17 at marriage	First marriage (later divorced)	Sealed for time and eternity	None with Young, 10 with Shaw	Daughter of Ezra Chase. Married to William Shaw in 1849 following her divorce from Young.
15	October 12, 1844 (aged 43)		Maria Lawrence (1823–1847), aged 20 at marriage	Plural widow of Joseph Smith	Sealed for time	None	Many sources do not mention her as being one of Young's wives. Married Almon W. Babbitt in 1846 in Nauvoo shortly before her death.
16	October 31, 1844 (aged 43)		Susanne Snively (1815–1892), aged 29 at marriage	First marriage	Sealed for time and eternity	1 with Young (adopted)	Lived for many years on Young's large Forest Farm on the outskirts of Salt Lake City.
17	November 7, 1844 (aged 43)		Olive Grey Frost (1816–1845), aged 28 at marriage	Plural widow of Joseph Smith	Sealed for time	None	Sealed to Joseph Smith for eternity and Young for life. Died in childbirth a year after her marriage to Young.
18	January 15, 1845 (aged 43)		Mary Ann Clark (1816–1881), aged 28 at marriage	Married to William Powers	Sealed for time and eternity	None with Young, 1 with Powers	Divorced Young in June 1851.
19	January 16, 1845 (aged 43)		Margaret Pierce (1823–1907), aged 22 at marriage	Widow of Morris Whitesides	Sealed for time	1 with Young	Sister of Mary Pierce (m. 1845). Sealed to Whitesides for eternity and Young for time. Originally had wished to be sealed to Young for eternity rather than to Whitesides, but Young protested, saying he did not wish to "rob the dead."
20	January 16, 1845 (aged 43)		Mary Harvey Pierce (1821–1847), aged 25 at marriage	First marriage	Sealed for time	None	Sister of Margaret Pierce (m. 1845). Died of consumption at Winter Quarters, Nebraska. Along with Margaret, the daughter of Robert and Hannah Pierce, who were later ritually adopted by Young.
21	April 30, 1845 (aged 43)		Emmeline (Emeline) Free (1826–1875), aged 18 at marriage	First marriage	Sealed for time and eternity	10 with Young (more than any other wife)	Frequently accompanied Young to social gatherings, and was regarded by many as Young's favorite. Felt slighted by Young's later marriages and became addicted to morphine.
22	May 22, 1845 (aged 43)		Mary Elizabeth Rollins Lightner (1818–1913), aged 26 at marriage	Plural widow of Joseph Smith and married to non-Mormon Adam Lightner	Sealed for time	None with Young, 10 with Lightner	Sealed to Joseph Smith for eternity and to Young for time. As a child, she and her sister are credited with rescuing papers that would later make up the Doctrine and Covenants from a mob upon the burning of the printing press in Independence, Missouri. Remained living with Lightner in Wisconsin, Minnesota, and Missouri until her death.
23	January 14, 1846 (aged 44)		Margaret Maria Alley (1825–1852), aged 20 at marriage	First marriage	Sealed for time and eternity	2 with Young	Traveled West with the Brigham Young company in 1848. Died shortly after giving birth to their second child. Grandmother of Mahonri Young, sculptor of the This Is the Place Monument and the Seagull Monument.
24	January 15, 1846 (aged 44)		Olive Andrews (1818–1879), aged 27 at marriage	Posthumous plural wife of Joseph Smith	Sealed for time	None with Young, 7 with other husbands	Sealed to Joseph Smith for eternity (by proxy after his death) and to Young for time.
25	January 15, 1846 (aged 44)		Emily Haws (1823–?), aged 22 at marriage	Widow of William Whitmarsh	Sealed for time and eternity	None with Young, 1 with Whitmarsh	Sealed for eternity to Young.
26	January 21, 1846 (aged 44)		Martha Bowker (1822–1890), aged 23 at marriage	First marriage	Sealed for time and eternity	1 with Young	Adoptive mother of her only daughter.
27	January 21, 1846 (aged 44)		Ellen Rockwood (1829–1866), aged 16 at marriage	First marriage	Sealed for time and eternity	None	Arrived in the Salt Lake Valley with the Young family in September 1848.
28	January 28, 1846 (aged 44)		Jemima Angell (1803–1869), aged 41 at marriage	Widow of Valentine Young (no relation) and separated from William Stringham prior to her 1846 marriage to Young	Sealed for time and eternity	None with (Brigham) Young, 5 with (Valentine) Young	Married Young on the same day as her mother Phebe (m. 1846). Younger sister of Mary Ann Angell (m. 1834).
29	January 28, 1846 (aged 44)		Abigail Marks (1781–1846), aged 69 at marriage	Widow of Asa Works	Sealed for time and eternity	None with Young, 9 with Works	Mother of Young's first wife, Miriam Works. Sealed to Works for eternity and to Young for time.
30	January 28, 1846 (aged 44)		Phebe (alt. Phoebe) Ann Morton (1786–1854), aged 59 at marriage	Previously married to James W. Angell (estranged)	Sealed for time and eternity	None with Young, 11 with Angell	Mother of both Mary Ann Angell (m. 1834) and Jemima Angell (m. 1846). Young's mother-in-law at the time of their marriage. Sealed to Angell for eternity and to Young for time.
31	January 28, 1846 (aged 44)		Cynthia Porter (1783–1861), aged 62 at marriage	Married to William Weston	Sealed for time and eternity	None with Young, 2 with Weston	Unknown if she was widowed, divorced, or separated from Weston.
32	January 31, 1846 (aged 44)		Mary Eliza Nelson (1812–1886), aged 33 at marriage	Widow of John P. Greene	Sealed for time	None with Young, 1 with Greene	Sealed to John P. Greene for eternity and to Young for time. Divorced from Young by 1850.
33	January 31, 1846 (aged 44)		Rhoda Richards (1784–1879), aged 61 at marriage	Plural widow of Joseph Smith	Sealed for time	None	Sealed to Joseph Smith for eternity and to Young for time. The sister of Young's counselor Willard Richards and first cousin to Young.
34	February 2, 1846 (aged 44)		Zina Diantha Huntington (1821–1901), aged 25 at marriage	Married to Mormon Henry Bailey Jacobs, plural widow of Joseph Smith	Sealed for time	1 with Young, 2 with Jacobs	Third general president of the Relief Society, and played a prominent role in the Society's reorganization. Sealed to Joseph Smith for eternity and to Young for time (not sealed to Jacobs). Transitioned to living with the Young family while Jacobs was on a mission to England. Served as the Young family midwife while living in the Lion House. Mother of Zina P. Young Card.
35	February 3, 1846 (aged 44)		Amy Cecilia Cooper (1804–1852), aged 41 at marriage	Married to (non-Mormon?) Joseph Aldrich.	Sealed for time and eternity	None with Young, 1 with Aldrich	Later separated from Aldrich.
36	February 3, 1846 (aged 44)		Mary Ellen de la Montaigne (1803–1894), aged 42 at marriage	divorced from James Boyd Woodward	Sealed for time and eternity	None with Young, 4 with Woodward	Ritually adopted by Young as his daughter (along with her husband), before being sealed to him two days later as his wife. Divorced Young and remarried Woodward.
37	February 3, 1846 (aged 44)		Julia Foster (1811–1891), aged 36 at marriage	Widow of Mormon Jonathan Hampton, who died in Nauvoo in 1844	Sealed for time	None with Young, 5 with previous husbands	Joined the church in 1833 after being converted by Young. Stayed in Illinois when Young emigrated to Utah in 1847. Married Thomas Cole after the death of her first husband, but was later abandoned. Young sent for her in 1855, and she came with her children and managed the Lion House.
38	February 3, 1846 (aged 44)		Abigail Harback (1790–1849), aged 55 at marriage	Previously married to John Calvin Hall (unknown if she was widowed, divorced, or separated)	Sealed for time and eternity	None with Young, 9 with Hall.	Died in Massachusetts. Circumstances surrounding her marriage to Hall and Young, as well as her time in Nauvoo, are unclear.
39	February 3, 1846 (aged 44)		Mary Ann Turley (1827–1904), aged 18 at marriage	First marriage (later divorced)	Sealed for time and eternity	None with Young, 9 with Cook	Divorced Young in January 1851 and moved to the San Bernardino, California colony. Met and married John Cook in California.
40	February 6, 1846 (aged 44)		Naamah Carter (1821–1909), aged 24 at marriage	Widow of John S. Twiss	Sealed for time	None	First husband died shortly after marriage. Helped prepare the sealing rooms in the Salt Lake Endowment House. Originally had wished to be sealed to Young for eternity rather than to Twiss, but Young protested, saying he did not wish to "rob the dead."
41	February 6, 1846 (aged 44)		Nancy Cressy (1780–1871), aged 65 at marriage	Widow of Oliver Walker	Sealed for time	None with Young, 10 with Walker	Sealed for eternity to Walker and for time to Young. Came to the Salt Lake Valley in Young's company.
42	February 10, 1846 (aged 44)		Jane Terry (1819–1847), aged 26 at marriage	Widow of George W. Young (no relation)	Sealed for time and eternity	None with Young, 2 with previous husbands	Requested on her deathbed to be sealed to Young. Died four days after their marriage in Winter Quarters, Nebraska. Sealing was reconfirmed in 1869 in the Salt Lake Endowment House.
43	March 20, 1847 (aged 45)		Lucy Bigelow (1830–1905), aged 16 at marriage	First marriage	Sealed for time and eternity	3 with Young	Sister of Mary Jane Bigelow (m. 1847). Married Young at Winter Quarters. A major figure in the dedication and opening of the St. George and Manti Temples. Mother of Susa Young Gates, and grandmother of Emma Lucy Gates Bowen, Leah D. Widtsoe, and B. Cecil Gates.
44	March 20, 1847 (aged 45)		Mary Jane Bigelow (1827–1868), aged 19 at marriage	First marriage (later divorced)	Sealed for time and eternity	None	Sister of Lucy Bigelow (m. 1847). Married Young at Winter Quarters, but turned back when she became ill. Later arrived in Utah in 1850. Divorced Young sometime before 1851.
45	April 18, 1848 (aged 46)		Sarah Malin (1804–1858), aged 43 at marriage	First marriage (later divorced)	Sealed for time and eternity	None	Married Young on the same day that he sealed her father to a wife.
46	October 3, 1852 (aged 51)		Eliza Burgess (1827–1915), aged 25 at marriage	First marriage	Sealed for time and eternity	1 with Young	Traveled from England to Nauvoo with her family before heading west to the Salt Lake Valley. Lived in the Young household as a servant before her sealing to Young.
47	December 16, 1852 (aged 51)		Mary Oldfield (1793–1875), aged 59 at marriage	Widow of Eli Kelsey and divorced from John Pierce and John Gribble	Sealed for time and eternity	None with Young, 7 with Kelsey	Sealed to Young for time and eternity, but never joined the Young household.
48	before 1853 (aged 51) (Note: Age on January 1, 1853)		Eliza Babcock (1828–1868), aged 24 at marriage	Previously married to Dominicus Carter (divorced) (later divorced from Young)	Unknown	None	Broke her collarbone at the Elk Horn River and was forced to return to Winter Quarters. Divorced Young and married John James Groves in 1855.
49	June 10, 1855 (aged 54)		Catherine (Katharine) Reese (1804–1860), aged 51 at marriage	Widow of Zephaniah Clawson	Sealed for time and eternity	None with Young, 6 with Clawson	Sealed to Young for time and eternity, but never joined the Young household.
50	March 14, 1856 (aged 54)		Harriet Barney (1830–1911), aged 25 at marriage	Divorced from W. H. H. Sagers	Sealed for time and eternity	1 with Young, 6 with Sagers	Daughter of Royal Barney, a Zion's Camp veteran.
51	January 24, 1863 (aged 61)		Harriet Amelia Folsom (1838–1910), aged 24 at marriage	First marriage	Sealed for time and eternity	None	Daughter of architect William H. Folsom. Accomplished pianist and vocalist. Lived in the Gardo House along with Mary Ann Angell (m. 1834) after Young's death. Rumored to be Young's favorite wife, and was his most significant female companion during the latter years of his life. Married John Quincy Leavitt after Young's death.
52	January 8, 1868 (aged 66) (Note: The marriage year of 1868 is according to her obituary.) (Note: Other sources suggest a marriage on this day in 1865.)		Mary Van Cott (1844–1884), aged 23 at marriage	Divorced from James Thornton Cobb (son of wife no. 4)	Sealed for time and eternity	1 with Young, 1 with Cobb	Former daughter-in-law of Augusta Adams (m. 1843).
53	April 7, 1868 (aged 66)		Ann Eliza Webb (1844–1917), aged 24 at marriage	Divorced from James L. Dee	Sealed for time and eternity	None with Young, 2 with Dee	Acted in various minor roles at the Salt Lake Theatre and was friends with several of Young's daughters and wives. Lived with her mother in a cottage built for her by Young following their sealing. Sought a civil divorce from Young in 1875 and later became an outspoken critic of polygamy. Author of her 1875 autobiography Wife No. 19. Later married and divorced Moses R. Denning.
54	July 3, 1869 (aged 68)		Elizabeth Jones (1814–1895), aged 55 at marriage	Widow of David T. Lewis and Dan Jones	Sealed for time and eternity	None with Young, 8 with previous husbands	Born in Wales. Owned an inn called the White Lion, and hosted various groups of Mormon missionaries. Her son, Thomas Lewis, was castrated in October 1856 by an extralegal posse. Lived on Young's Forest Farm property following their sealing.
55	May 8, 1870 (aged 68)		Lydia Farnsworth (1808–1897), aged 61 at marriage	Married to Elijah Mayhew	Sealed for time and eternity	None with Young, 9 with Mayhew	Expressed her strong desire to be sealed to Young for years, until his concession in 1870. Sealed to Young for eternity but remained living with husband Mayhew.
56	December 8, 1872 (aged 71)		Hannah Tapfield (1807–1886), aged 65 at marriage	Married to non-Mormon Thomas O. King	Sealed for time and eternity	None with Young, 11 with King	Known for her poetry. Sealed to Young but remained living with husband King.

== Disputed wives ==
Various women have been listed in published accounts as being sealed to Young, though there is no evidence confirming their sealings. While some could possibly have been his wives and merely lack conclusive evidence to be proven as such, other claims have been completely disproven.

- Nancy Chamberlain, who Ann Eliza Webb claimed was one of Young's wives during one of her anti-Mormon lectures.
- Amanda Barnes, who was sealed to Joseph Smith in January 1852 with Young acting as a proxy.
- Charlotte Cobb, daughter of Augusta Adams Cobb (m. 1843)
- Mina A. Cook, listed in the 1860 census record as belonging to the Young household. No other information is provided to determine marital status.
- Susan Taffindor, listed in the 1860 census record as belonging to the Young household. No other information is provided to determine marital status.
- Eliza Y. Young, listed in the 1860 census record as belonging to the Young household. No other information is provided to determine marital status.
- Margaret G., reported by an apostate Mormon Samuel Hawthornthwaite as being married to Young. Given the lack of surname for Margaret, investigation becomes difficult.
- Talula Gibson, daughter of Walter Murray Gibson and was listed in the 1860 census as belonging to the Young household. No marriage record has been found.
- Sally Young Kanosh, a servant in the Young household
- Eleanor Jane McComb McLean, one of the twelve wives of Parley P. Pratt, who lived for a time at the Lion House.
- Sarah Ann McDonal, married a man named Brigham Jonathan Young from England, who scholars have mistaken as being Brigham Young.
- Two Sioux women, a rumor that was spread in a 1852 anti-Mormon polemic by William Hall.
- Jane Watt, wife and half sister of George D. Watt, rumored to have been married to Young.

== See also ==
- Descendants of Brigham Young
- List of Latter Day Saint practitioners of plural marriage
- List of Joseph Smith's wives
