= William Valentine (disambiguation) =

William Valentine (1862–1928) was an American educator and missionary.

William Valentine may also refer to:

- Billy Valentine (born William Valentine, 1925), American musician
- William Valentine (painter) (1798–1849), Canadian daguerreotyper and portrait painter
- William Valentine (politician) (born 1971/1972), American politician
- William Valentine, American musician and member of The Valentine Brothers

== See also ==
- William Valentine Black (1832–1927), American Mormon leader
- William Valentine Mayneord (1902–1988), British radiologist
- William Valentine Schevill (1864–1951), American painter
- William Valentine Wood (1883–1959), British businessman
