= Harriet Amelia Folsom =

Member of the Church of Jesus Christ of Latter-ay Saints (1838–1910)

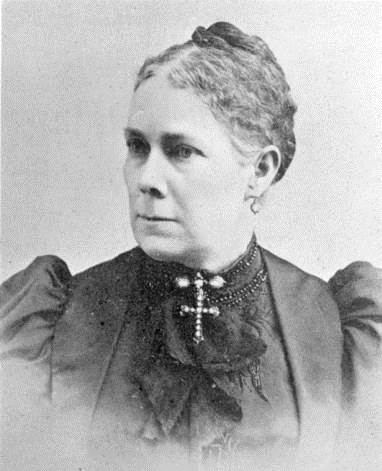
- Born: Harriet Amelia Folsom; August 23, 1838; Buffalo, New York, United States
- Died: December 11, 1910 (aged 72); Salt Lake City, Utah, United States
- Resting place: Salt Lake City Cemetery
- Spouse: Brigham Young (m. 1863)
- Parents: William H. Folsom (father); Zerviah Eliza Clark (mother)

Harriet Amelia Folsom Young (August 23, 1838 – December 11, 1910) was a pioneer and an early member of the Church of Jesus Christ of Latter-day Saints, as well as a cultural and political figure in Salt Lake City, Utah. An accomplished pianist and vocalist, Folsom was the fifty-first plural wife of Brigham Young, who served as the church's second president.

== Early life ==
Folsom was born in Buffalo, New York, on August 23, 1838. She was the daughter of William H. Folsom and Zerviah Eliza Clark, and the oldest of their eight children. Her father worked as a church-employed architect and contractor and designed many of the historic buildings in Utah, including the Salt Lake City Council Hall, the Provo Tabernacle, and the Manti Utah Temple. Her family joined the church in 1841 and moved to Nauvoo, Illinois, in 1846. After being driven out of the state of Illinois with the rest of the Saints, the family lived in both Keokuk and Council Bluffs, Iowa, where William Folsom worked as a contractor.

The Folsom family migrated to the Utah Territory with the Joseph W. Young pioneer company, arriving on October 3, 1860. As president of the church, Brigham Young would often come out to welcome the wagon trains arriving in the Valley, and became acquainted with Harriet Amelia upon the arrival of her company. Their meeting was said to be "love at first sight", and the two engaged in a courtship lasting nearly two years. They became engaged in August 1862.

== Marriage and family ==
Folsom married Brigham Young on January 24, 1863, in Salt Lake City, Utah. Upon her marriage to Young, Folsom began to go by Amelia rather than Harriet, as two of Young's other plural wives were also named Harriet. Prior to his marriage to Amelia, Young had heavily emphasized the spiritual foundations of the doctrine of plural marriage, and asserted the diminished role of sexual attraction in plural unions. However, his sealing and marriage to Folsom demonstrate that attraction still played a role in some of his unions, as many described theirs as being a "love match". Though Amelia never bore Young any children, his attraction to her stayed constant. Despite the rumors and controversy generated by her bond with Young, Folsom quickly became Young's most prominent female companion, and remained so throughout the rest of his life. She often accompanied Young on his tours of other Mormon settlements, as well as to events and gatherings in Salt Lake City.

After Young's death, Folsom maintained good relations with Young's other wives and children, stating:

We were all members of the same family and treated each other as such. I would sacrifice anything for the surviving wives of President Young, and their feeling toward me, I think, is the very same... I can't say that [Young] had any favorites. He was equally kind and attentive to all in his lifetime, and left each surviving wife an equal legacy... There is no reason why a polygamous marriage may not be as happy as the ordinary marriage, if it is entered understandingly.

Folsom was very private in her personal affairs, especially in regards to her marriage to Young. She granted an interview to a journalist only once in her lifetime: Eugene Traughber at the Salt Lake Tribune, fourteen years after Young's death. Traughber described her as "tall and symmetrical of form, dignified and graceful of manner and a brilliant conversationalist."

=== Young's "favorite wife" ===
Despite her rejection of the title, Folsom was known by many as Young's "favorite wife". Ann Eliza Webb, a former plural wife of Young and a critic of polygamy, portrayed Folsom as a domineering and controlling woman who was constantly feuding with Young's other wives, as well as Young himself. Concerning the bond between Folsom and Young, Webb wrote, “Polygamist, as he professes to be, he is, under the influence of Amelia, rapidly becoming a monogamist, in all except the name.” Young's other wives and children, however, noted Folsom's kindness and generosity towards them and all members of Young's household. Folsom herself denied the title of Young's "favorite wife", but was certainly his most frequent female companion during the later years of his life.

=== Gardo House ===
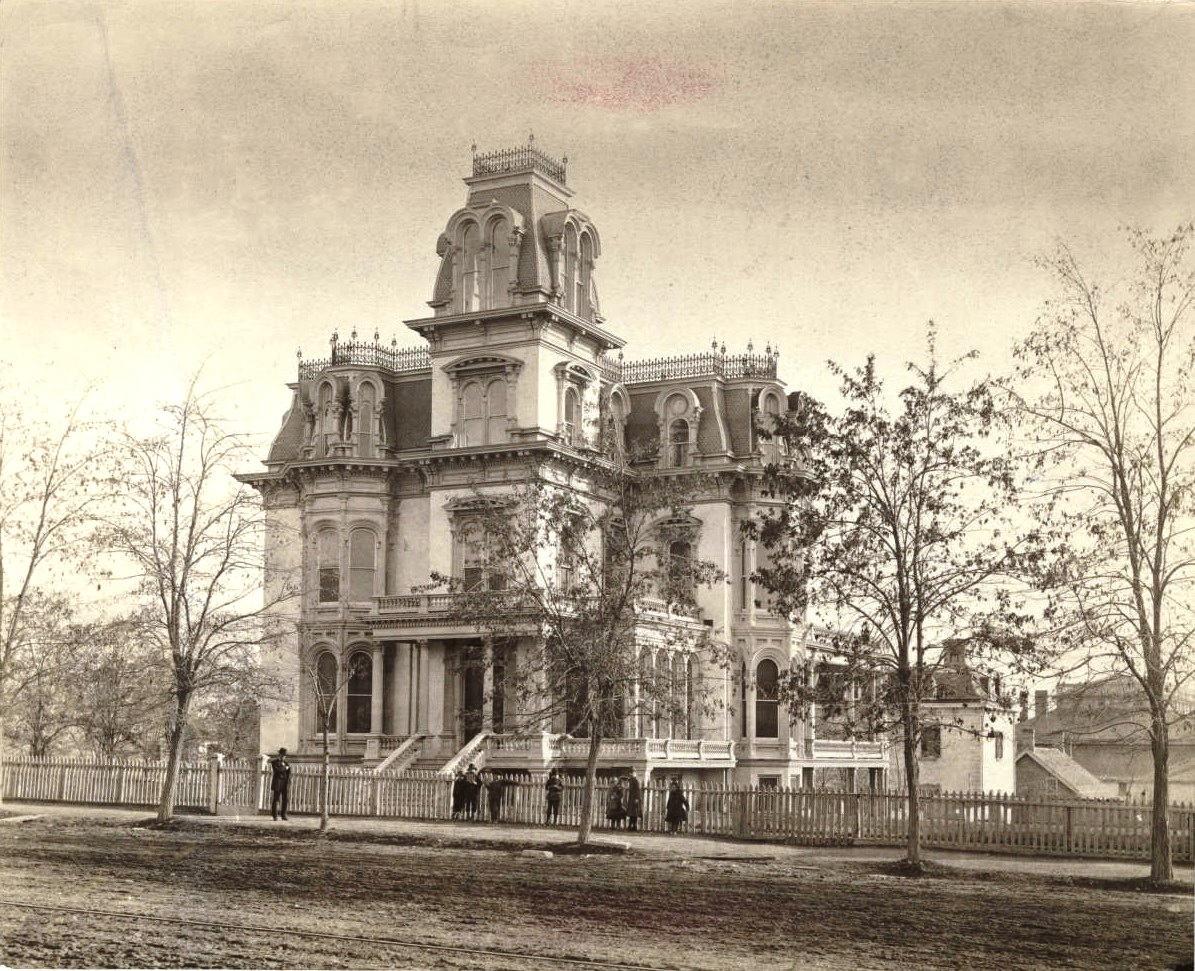
Gardo House, also known as "Amelia's Palace"

Folsom was associated with the Gardo House, also known as "Amelia's Palace", which was built by Brigham Young as a place to receive official callers and entertain dignitaries. The idea for such a residence was inspired by Joseph Smith's construction of the Nauvoo House, also intended to serve as an official residence for the president of the church. Construction began in 1873 on a lot just south of the Beehive House in Salt Lake City. William Folsom, Amelia's father, and Joseph Ridges were the primary architects of the house. Young built the Gardo House with the intention of making Folsom its primary resident and hostess, given her accomplishments in the arts, her poise, and her charm. Although he died before its completion, Young provided both Folsom and Mary Ann Angell, another of his wives, with a life tenancy in the Gardo House. Folsom only lived there for a few months during its construction. Due to the complications surrounding the division of Young's estate, in 1879 she moved to a new home nicknamed the "Junior Gardo", which was also designed and built by her father William.

== Public image and political activism ==
Folsom was an active figure in Utah society and politics, as well as in the greater United States. She was a prominent participant of the women's suffrage movement, and was one of fourteen women to sign a letter in February 1870 to Stephen A. Mann, the acting Utah territorial governor, thanking him for granting Utah women the right to vote. In the spring of 1902, she accompanied a group of Utah women to the Convention of the National Council of Women and the National American Woman Suffrage Association in Washington, D.C., where she was also presented to United States President Theodore Roosevelt by Utah Senator Thomas Kearns. She was also a member of the Committee for the Utah Centennial Exhibition in Philadelphia in 1876. In 1886 she attended the wedding reception of her distant relative Frances Folsom to President Grover Cleveland. She was also on the board of directors of the Utah Woman's Silk Association, and one of the directors of the Utah Board of Lady Managers of the World's Columbian Exposition in Chicago.

Amelia Folsom died on December 11, 1910, in Salt Lake City, Utah.
