= United States Shipbuilding Company =

The United States Shipbuilding Company was a short-lived trust made up of seven shipbuilding companies, a property owner and steel company. Its stocks and bonds were unattractive to investors, and several of its member shipyards were overvalued, conditions which brought down the company less than a year after it was formed in 1902. The company was replaced by the Bethlehem Steel Corporation in 1904.

At the turn of the 20th century, John Willard Young, a son of Mormon pioneer Brigham Young, promoted the idea that many leading American shipbuilding companies should form one gigantic combination. The United States Shipbuilding Company was the manifestation of that idea.

Following this course, the enterprise's central designing office would apportion the shipbuilding work to the yard best suited to handle the project, therefore increasing competition with European shipyards. Although American shipbuilding was not considered a highly profitable venture, the political environment seemed right for improvement. President William McKinley and his new Vice President, Theodore Roosevelt, had endorsed federal subsidies for American shipbuilding industries, to compensate for the subsidies provided by European governments, but Congress had not yet approved such a measure. A renowned naval architect and public servant, Lewis Nixon, was chosen to lead the venture, and helped attract several major shipyards to participate.

However, "the one thing [the consolidated firms] lacked, individually and collectively, was a realistic prospect of earning sustained profits." Financially the corporation failed almost immediately. As one scholar would later write of this plan, "the theory was impossible; the condition was untenable; the trust, as it was manufactured, was impracticable; and the United States Shipbuilding Company was insolvent."

== Groundwork ==
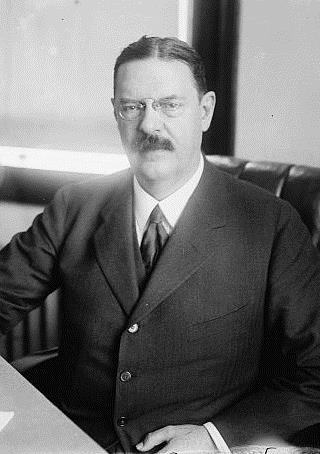
Lewis Nixon

Young first obtained an option to purchase the Newport News Shipbuilding and Drydock Company (of Newport News, Virginia), then approached Nixon, who was then the lessor of the Crescent Shipyard in Elizabethport, New Jersey. Nixon agreed to work with Young in forming the proposed combination, and granted him an option on his own plant. They then obtained options to purchase other shipbuilding companies. Working with a cotton industry bank known as the Trust Company of the Republic, they sought out underwriters, and planned to issue stock and sell bonds, in order to provide the funds to buy the plants and then operate them at a profit.

An initial prospectus was prepared for issue on May 7, 1901, but the actual issuance was withheld at the last moment because of what became known as the Northern Pacific "short squeeze" of 1901, a panic that occurred on that date. A news dispatch of that date described the proposed combination. It described a combination that would include Union Iron Works (of San Francisco), Bath Iron Works of Bath, Maine, Hyde Windlass Co. (also of Bath), Crescent Shipyard, Samuel J. Moore & Sons Co. of Elizabethport, New Jersey, Canda Manufacturing Co. of Carteret, New Jersey, and Newport News Shipbuilding and Drydock Co. All but Canda Manufacturing were shipyards, and Canda (which manufactured car wheels) reportedly owned a prime location near Staten Island for construction of a new shipyard.

Three months later, it was again announced (again prematurely) that the new corporation would be launched in a few days. This time, British arms manufacturer Vickers Sons & Maxim, which had acquired the William Cramp & Sons shipyard in Philadelphia, and the Bethlehem Ship & Armor Plate works were included on the published list of interests included in the corporation. Ultimately, Vickers stayed out of the venture.

In September 1901, while the USSC was still just a concept, Roosevelt replaced the assassinated President McKinley. Roosevelt had crusaded against trusts, and his elevation created a hostile environment toward formation of combinations like USSC, marked by the Department of Justice's suit in February 1902 to prevent the formation of the Northern Securities Company railroad trust. Meanwhile, federal shipyard subsidy legislation stalled in Congress.

== The 1902 rollout ==
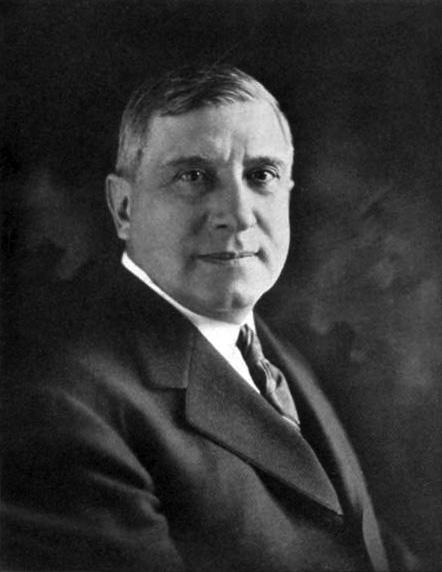
Charles M. Schwab

By the time that a prospectus for USSC was formally issued in June 1902, Newport News and Vickers Sons & Maxim were no longer listed as participating interests, but Harlan & Hollingsworth Co. of Wilmington, Delaware, and Eastern Shipbuilding Company of New London, Connecticut were now included.

The June 1902 prospectus stated, among other things, that the USSC had been organized under the laws of the State of New Jersey and described as its directors Nixon, Henry T. Scott (president of Union Iron Works), Charles J. Canda (president of Canda Manufacturing Co.), John S. Hyde (president of Hyde Windlass Co.), E. W. Hyde (president of Bath Iron Works), and Irving M. Scott (Vice President and General Manager of Union Iron Works). In fact, incorporation had not yet occurred, and the board had not yet been constituted. Once the company was organized several months later, only four of those mentioned in the prospectus as directors ever served as directors. The prospectus also stated that the plants were earning $2.25 million for a year and had abundant facilities for additional work and increased earnings.

Even with positive representations in the prospectus, however, the public purchased less than $500,000 of the $9 million in bonds offered for sale, and foreign underwriters offered no cash, only promises (that were ultimately never honored). Eager to make the USSC more attractive to investors but facing a huge shortfall in funds, the promoters turned to Charles M. Schwab, then president of United States Steel, to discuss USSC acquiring Bethlehem Steel Company (which at the time was more sound than the shipyards already in the combination). With little cash to offer for Bethlehem (then held by a J.P. Morgan syndicate), the promoters instead proposed to pay for the acquisition with $7.2 million in cash and $2.5 million in USSC stock issued against the plants themselves. The cash came from Schwab, who furnished it on conditions that were highly favorable to him. By bringing Bethlehem into the combination, however, USSC could send a message to potential investors that Morgan was now behind the overall venture, and claim to be the world's only company capable of building a battleship complete with armament, armor and all equipment.

In August 1902 USSC purchased the Union, Bath, Hyde Windlass, Crescent, Moore, Eastern, Harlan & Hollingsworth shipyards, the Canda Manufacturing company, and the capital stock of Bethlehem Steel. The par value of these transactions totaled $69.5 million – yet (with the exception of Bethlehem Steel) the total value of the companies was appraised at less than $12.5 million. It soon became clear that the Bath, Crescent, Moore, Eastern, and Harlan & Hollingsworth shipyards were deeply indebted, and that the new trust lacked the ability to meet charges arising from the bond issuance. The goal of organizing a huge trust had been accomplished, but the result was doomed to fail, because from the start it was "already a water-logged wreck." The promoters were immediately forced to personally borrow $1.5 million from New York banks, to make up for cash that never arrived from foreign subscribers. USSC's problems brought down the Trust Company of the Republic, which had placed its own future on the line when arranging USSC's financing, by purchasing the largest share of bonds.

In September 1902, when Young was in France in a futile attempt to convince subscribers to invest, Ann Pulitzer, a former prostitute, was murdered in his New York apartment. His son William Hooper Young, who had been living there, eventually pleaded guilty to second-degree murder. Prosecutors accepted the plea and dropped first-degree murder charges because of evidence that Hooper Young was mentally ill.

== The collapse ==
Schwab took control of USSC within a year of its incorporation, but USSC's mortgageholders soon forced it into receivership. A federal court appointed former U.S. Senator James Smith Jr. as the receiver. The company was replaced by the Bethlehem Steel Corporation, in 1904.

== Aftermath ==
One of USSC's first actions was to close Nixon's Crescent Shipyard. By then, Nixon had re-entered the shipbuilding business by leasing a yard in Perth Amboy, New Jersey.

In 1905 John S. Hyde, son of the founder of the Bath Iron Works, purchased the Iron Works and Hyde Windlass Co. from the surviving company, which had bought the companies out of the receivership. It flourished as a supplier of major ships to the U.S. Navy.

Bethlehem Shipbuilding and Steel repurchased and kept for itself the Union Iron Works in San Francisco and the Harlan & Hollingsworth Co. shipyard in Delaware (and began purchasing other shipyards). The name of the Delaware operation changed from Harlan & Hollingsworth to the Harlan Plant of Bethlehem Steel. That shipyard closed in 1926, although it was reopened for a time during the Second World War and part of the shipyard was used by the Dravo Corporation until 1964.

Litigation arising from USSC's collapse continued for many years, as various victims sought relief against alleged wrongdoers. Plaintiffs in such suits included former New York Governor Benjamin Barker Odell Jr., railroad president John Caldwell Calhoun (grandson of the former vice president of the same name), and John W. Young, originator of the idea. In 1915, Smith (whose own financial enterprises had collapsed) was suing Schwab for fees allegedly owed him from his USSC receivership. In 1918, New York's highest court ordered a retrial of claims by shareholders of the Trust Company of the Republic against railroad president George Gould, a member of its board of directors who failed to attend any of the meetings where key votes were cast. On remand, the court ruled against Gould, and entered a $723,583 judgment against him in September 1919.
