= Isaac Trumbo =

Isaac Trumbo (1858–1912) was a prominent California businessman and a colonel in the California National Guard. He was born in Nevada and grew up in Salt Lake City. His maternal grandfather, Colonel John Reese, was the founder of Nevada at Genoa, and also a Mormon. His mother was also a member of the Church of Jesus Christ of Latter Day Saints, (although disaffected later in life), and Isaac was known for his good relationships with the church. His dream was to see Utah become a state. He became an important lobbyist for this cause in Washington DC. His efforts helped Utah finally achieve statehood.

After the statehood question was resolved, in 1895 Trumbo and his wife moved to Salt Lake City and took up residence in the Gardo House, a large mansion originally built by Brigham Young for one of his wives, and later the official residence of the president of the church. He became active in the Utah Republican Party and became identified as an advocate for the Free Silver doctrine. Trumbo believed that he would be offered one of Utah's two seats in the United States Senate as a reward for his statehood efforts. However, this did not occur, in part because Utah's non-Mormons were concerned that Trumbo was too closely aligned with Mormon interests. The Trumbos returned to San Francisco, although they maintained a close relationship with church president Wilford Woodruff, who died in 1898 at Trumbo's home.

Trumbo lost his home on Sutter Street in 1911 after failing to pay the mortgage. He died in November 1912, after he was assaulted in street.
