= Mormon Pioneer Memorial Monument =

Cemetery in Salt Lake City, Utah, U.S.

Coordinates: 40°46′13″N 111°53′8″W

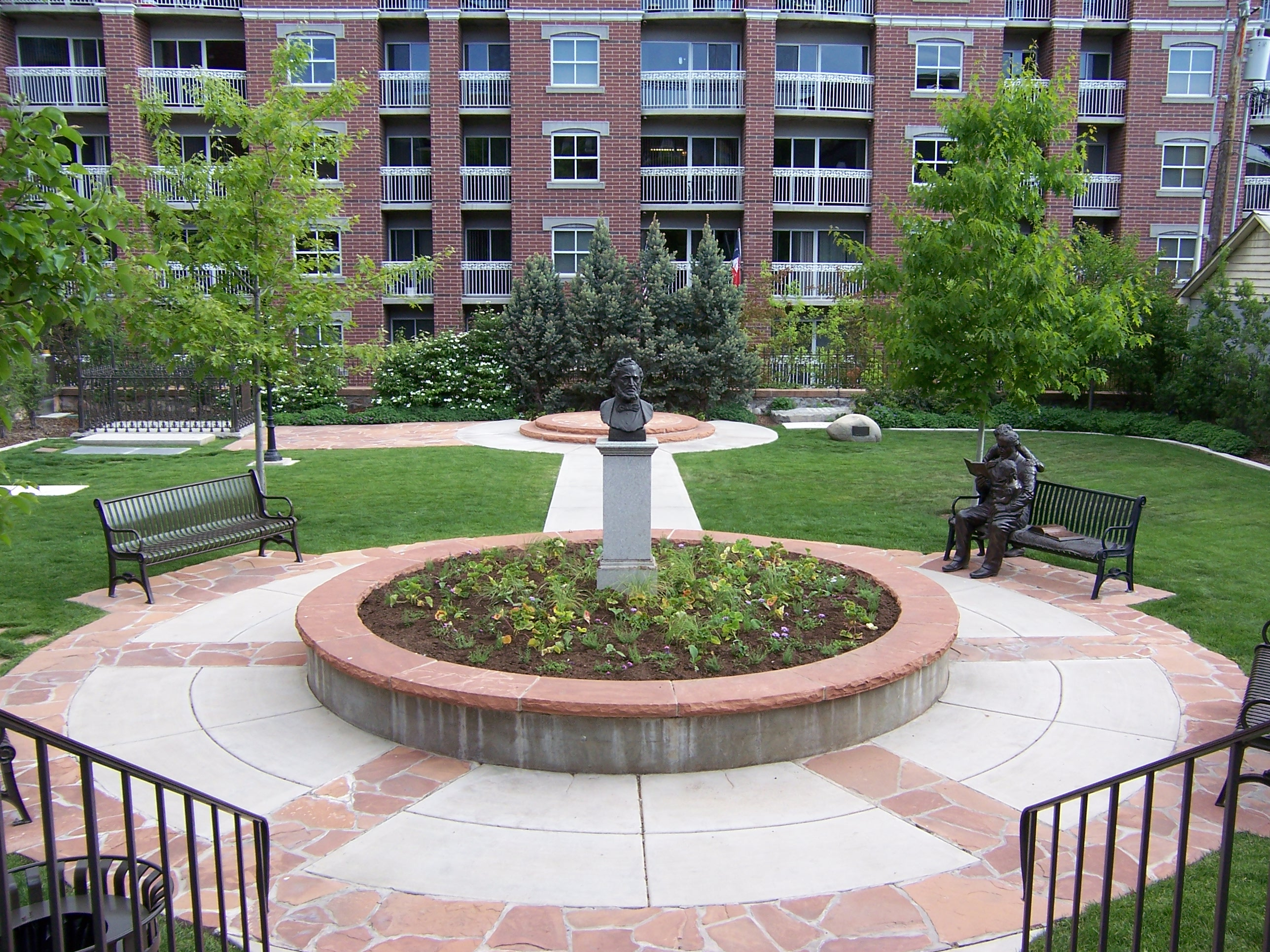
- Cemetery entrance

- Location within Utah
- Location: Downtown Salt Lake City, Utah, US

History
- Founded: June 1, 1974

Site notes
- Restored: 2022
- Governing body: The Church of Jesus Christ of Latter-day Saints

The Mormon Pioneer Memorial Monument (also known as the Brigham Young Family Cemetery) is a private cemetery and memorial. It is the burial site of Brigham Young and several of his wives and children. Part of the property was dedicated to the Mormon pioneers who died making the journey to Utah from Illinois and other parts of the world between 1847 and 1869.

== Burial site ==
The majority of graves in the cemetery are unmarked and prior to restoration work that began in the early 2020s, ground-penetrating radar was used, during which 40-plus graves were discovered. The marked graves include:

1. Brigham Young – an American leader in the Latter Day Saint movement and a settler of the Western United States. He was the president of the Church of Jesus Christ of Latter-day Saints (LDS Church); the founder of Salt Lake City; and the first governor of the Utah Territory. Young also led the founding of the precursors to the University of Utah and Brigham Young University.
2. Mary Ann Angell Young – the sister of Salt Lake Temple architect Truman O. Angell. Brigham's first wife died before he joined the church. Mary was his second wife. They had six children. Brigham's first wife, Miriam Works, had two children with him before she died in 1832.
3. Eliza R. Snow – was sealed to Joseph Smith. Following his death, she was sealed to Brigham Young for time as his 10th wife. It was believed she did not have a connubial relationship with either prophet. She was one of the most celebrated Latter-day Saint women of the nineteenth century. A renowned poet, she chronicled history, celebrated nature and relationships, and expounded scripture and doctrine.
4. Joseph Angell Young – the first son of Brigham and Mary Angell
5. Alice Young Clawson – Alice Young Clawson was the 4th child of Brigham and Mary Ann Angell.
6. Lucy Ann Decker Young (1822–1891) – Lucy Ann Decker was 20 when she became Brigham's third wife (and first polygamous wife) on June 14, 1842. She was previously married to and divorced from William Seeley. She was well organized and efficiently ran the Lion House. Her younger sister, Clarissa (Clara) Decker, became Brigham's 4th polygamous wife two years later, at age 16, and crossed the plains with him and her mother, Harriet Wheeler Decker
7. Mary Van Cott Young (1844–1884) – wife number 51. She married her first husband, James Cobb, three months before being married to Brigham. Her father, John Van Cott, was well known and respected.
8. Emeline Free Young (1826–1875) – wife number 21.

== Memorial park ==
An upper portion of the property was dedicated by N. Eldon Tanner as a memorial park to the Mormon pioneers on June 1, 1974, which was the 173rd anniversary of Brigham Young's birth. The park was redesigned and restored in 2000. An additional redesign was done beginning in the early 2020s, and the park and cemetery was rededicated on October 22, 2022.

The monument is open to the public daily. The sculpture All Is Well is installed on the site.
