= All Is Well (sculpture) =

Sculpture in Salt Lake City, Utah, U.S.

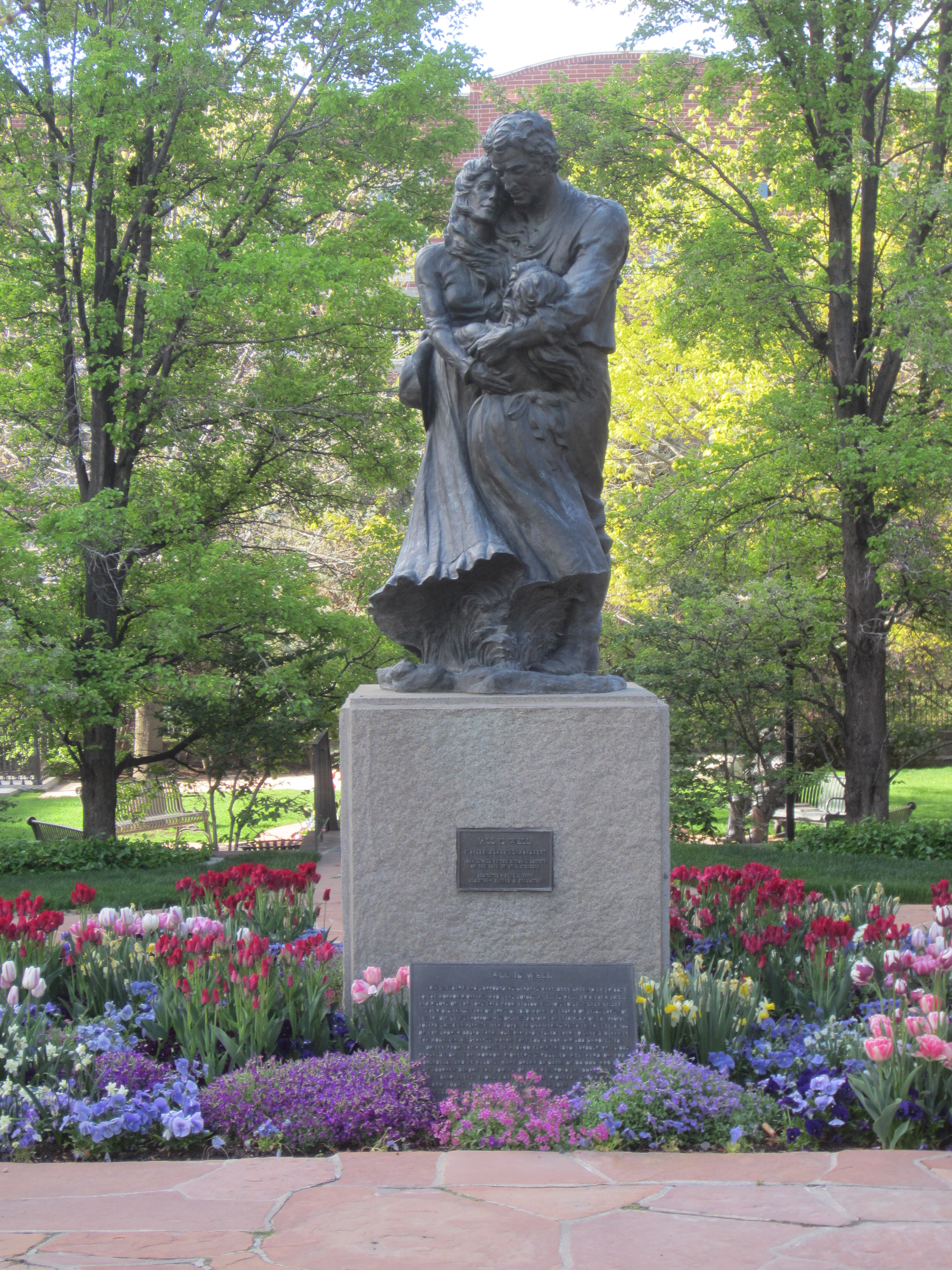
- The sculpture in 2021
- Artist: Edward F. Fraughton
- Year: 1974
- Location: Salt Lake City, Utah, U.S.
- 40°46′13.3″N 111°53′8.3″W

All Is Well is a 1974 sculpture by Edward J. Fraughton commemorating Mormon pioneers, installed in Salt Lake City's Mormon Pioneer Memorial Monument, in the U.S. state of Utah.
