= Gardo House =

Former Gilded Age mansion in Salt Lake City, Utah

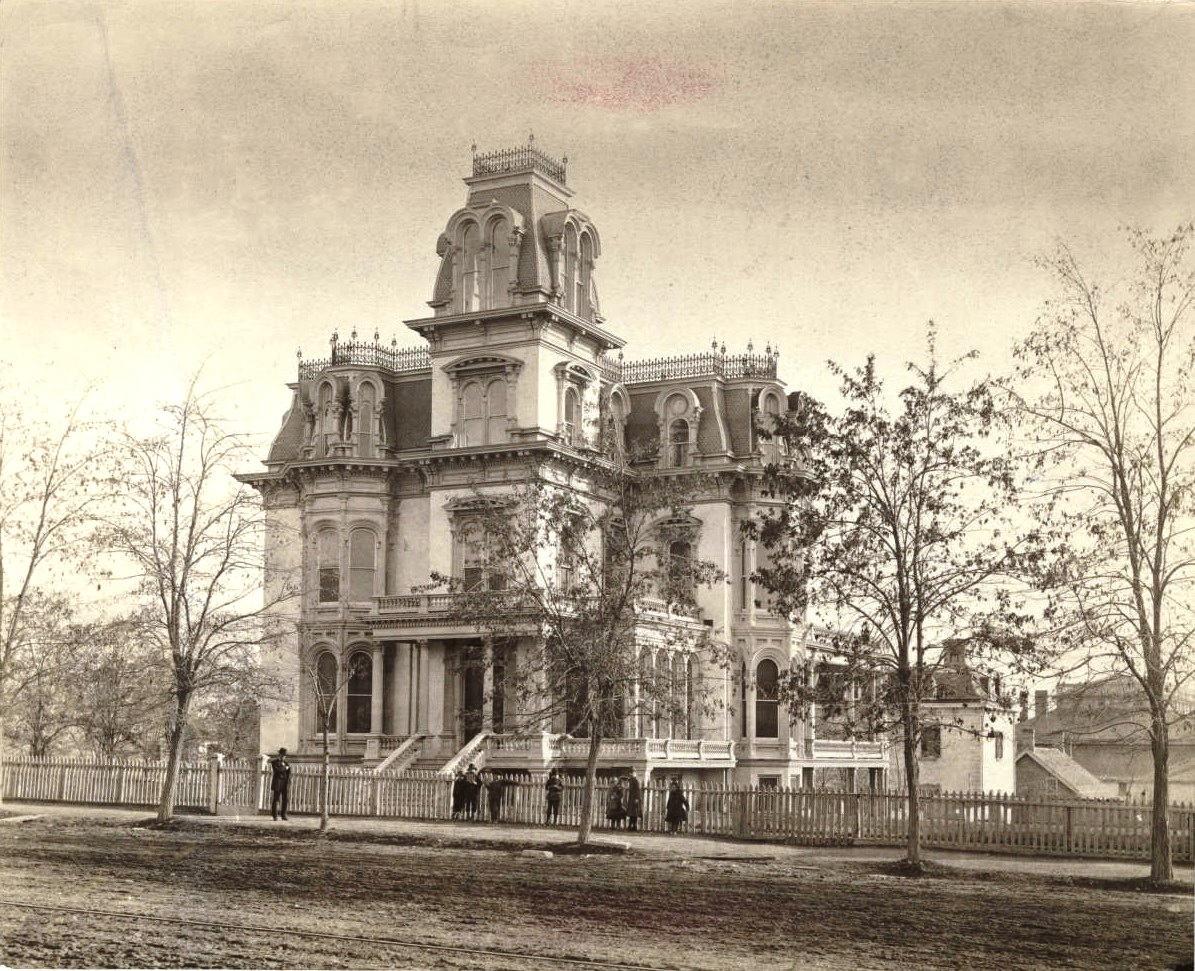
- The mansion, circa 1879
- Interactive map of the Gardo House area

General information
- Architectural style: Second Empire
- Location: 70 East South Temple, Salt Lake City, Utah
- Coordinates: 40°46′09″N 111°53′19″W
- Construction started: 1873
- Inaugurated: 1883
- Demolished: 1921
- Cost: estimated at $30,000 – $50,000
- Owner: Brigham Young (1873–1878) family The Church of Jesus Christ of Latter-day Saints (1878–1901; 1920–1921); Edward F. & Susanna Holmes (1901–1920)

Technical details
- Floor count: 4 (including basement)

Design and construction
- Architects: Joseph H. Ridges; William H. Folsom

The Gardo House (Note: aka Guardo House) was a Gilded Age mansion in Salt Lake City, Utah. Built from 1873 to 1883, it became the official residence (Note: beginning on April 9, 1879) of the president of the Church of Jesus Christ of Latter-day Saints (LDS Church) during the tenures of John Taylor and Wilford Woodruff. It was later occupied by several different families from Salt Lake City's high society, before being demolished in 1921 to make way for the Federal Reserve's Salt Lake City branch building.

== Construction ==
Joseph H. Ridges, designer and builder of the original Salt Lake Tabernacle organ, and William H. Folsom, worked together to draw the plans and superintend the construction. Folsom, who had been LDS Church Architect from 1861 to 1867, had played a vital role in the design and construction of the Salt Lake Theatre, Salt Lake Tabernacle, St. George Tabernacle, Salt Lake Temple, Manti Temple, St. George Temple, and many private residences. He was also the father of Harriet Amelia Folsom Young, making him Brigham Young's father-in-law.

Located in Salt Lake City at 70 East South Temple, (Note: Legal description: East half of Lot 6, Block 75, Plat A) the structure was built south of Young's Beehive House, and directly east of the 1855 LDS Church historian's office. Construction began in 1873; after completion, it was dedicated on February 22, 1883.

The finished home had four levels, including the basement, with a tower on the northwest corner. The foundation and basement were made of granite. The exterior walls were of 2 x 6 studs infilled with adobe bricks, with lath and plaster on the inside and two layers of lath and stucco on the outside. The interior woodwork, which included a spiral staircase, paneling, and decorative trim, was carved in black walnut by local artists. Elegant furnishings, paintings by local artists, and mirrors imported from Europe graced all the rooms. Several writers estimated that the church expended between $30,000 and $50,000 to finish the building and furnish its interior. Wilford Woodruff estimated the cost at $15,000. The Salt Lake Tribune claimed that Ralph Ramsay, a famous Utah woodcarver, did some of the woodwork in the Gardo. Ramsay had done woodwork in the Beehive House and Lion House and had carved the eagle on the original Eagle Gate. However, he moved from Salt Lake City to Richfield in 1874, which may have precluded him from working on the Gardo House. In addition, it has been noted that the style of the woodwork in the Gardo was dissimilar to known examples of Ramsay's work.

== History ==
=== Young family ===
During the last years of his life, Brigham Young perceived a need for a place where he could receive official callers and entertain the dignitaries who traveled great distances to see him. This idea goes as far back as the Nauvoo Era, in which Joseph Smith proposed a similar idea under the name of the Mansion House. The Mansion House, along with the later Nauvoo House, was to act as a place for travelers to come and stay in Nauvoo with hospitality in mind.

Young was fond of naming his homes; one source claims that he borrowed the name Gardo from a favorite Spanish novel.

Progress on the mansion was slow. There were numerous delays in obtaining the necessary lumber, plaster, granite and glass. Young, who was often away on church business, was seldom available to sign requisitions or make important decisions. However, on one occasion, after returning to Salt Lake City from a visit to St. George, he expressed displeasure with the style of the home, calling it his "tabernacle organ."

After three years of construction, the Gardo House was nearing completion when an accident occurred on nearby Arsenal Hill (now Capitol Hill). On April 5, 1876, two young hunters fired their guns into one of the structures on the hill used to store gunpowder and explosives. The resulting explosion showered the city with 500 tons of boulders, concrete, and pebbles. Many persons were injured; some, including the hunters, were killed. The explosion also broke several of the glass windows in the Gardo House, and new glass had to be ordered from the East. By May 20, the windows were reinstalled and construction had resumed.

Brigham Young died on August 29, 1877, before the mansion was completed. In his will, Young had provided both Mary Ann Angell Young and Harriet Amelia Folsom Young a life tenancy in the Gardo House, and in order to secure their claims, the two women occupied the mansion briefly while it was still under construction. During probate of his estate, the home was credited to the two women at a value of $120,000, but it was also discovered that Young owed the LDS Church one million dollars. As part of a settlement, the mansion was received by the Church, less a payment of $20,000 to the women, to help recapitulate the indebtedness.

=== Official residence of the Latter-day Saint Church President ===
John Taylor succeeded Young as church president. His counselor George Q. Cannon and other church leaders suggested that Taylor occupy the Gardo House after its completion, but he repeatedly refused. However, when church members unanimously voted on April 9, 1879, to make the Gardo House the official parsonage for LDS Church presidents, Taylor reluctantly accepted their decision. Moses Thatcher, William Jennings, and Angus M. Cannon were appointed as a committee to oversee completion of the mansion.

On December 27, 1881, the Deseret News published a letter from Taylor announcing a public reception and tour of the Gardo House on January 2, 1882, from 11 a.m. until 3 p.m. More than two thousand people attended the reception and toured the home. Taylor greeted all the visitors, who were entertained by two bands and several renditions by the Tabernacle Choir. An early visitor to the mansion was Oscar Wilde, whom Taylor introduced to the residence while showing Wilde around Salt Lake on April 10, 1882. Wilde spoke well of the house saying it "had a good deal of feeling in it in the pleasing works of art and good furniture." A year later, on February 22, 1883, the mansion was dedicated as a "House unto the Lord" in a dedicatory prayer offered by Apostle Franklin D. Richards. Moses Thatcher, William Jennings, Angus M. Cannon, and their wives were particularly noted as being among the guests. Also noted were Joseph F. Smith, Francis M. Lyman, John H. Smith, and Daniel H. Wells.

By the time Taylor had become church president, the Edmunds-Tucker Act was putting intense pressure on him to observe this anti-bigamy law. He sought to comply with the law by moving into the Gardo House with his sister, Agnes Taylor. She took over management of the mansion while he continued his duties as president.

=== Later usage ===
Soon after Taylor's death in 1887, the federal government seized the Gardo House, along with other church properties, as part of the escheatment provisions of the Edmunds-Tucker Act. The government then rented the properties back to the church, and Taylor's successor as president, Wilford Woodruff, used the house as an office, for public and private gatherings, and occasionally spent the night. The church vacated the house in November 1891, after having paid more than $28,000 (equivalent to $1,003,333 in 2025) to rent the Gardo House (their own property) over a four-year period. The government then rented the home to the Keeley Institute.

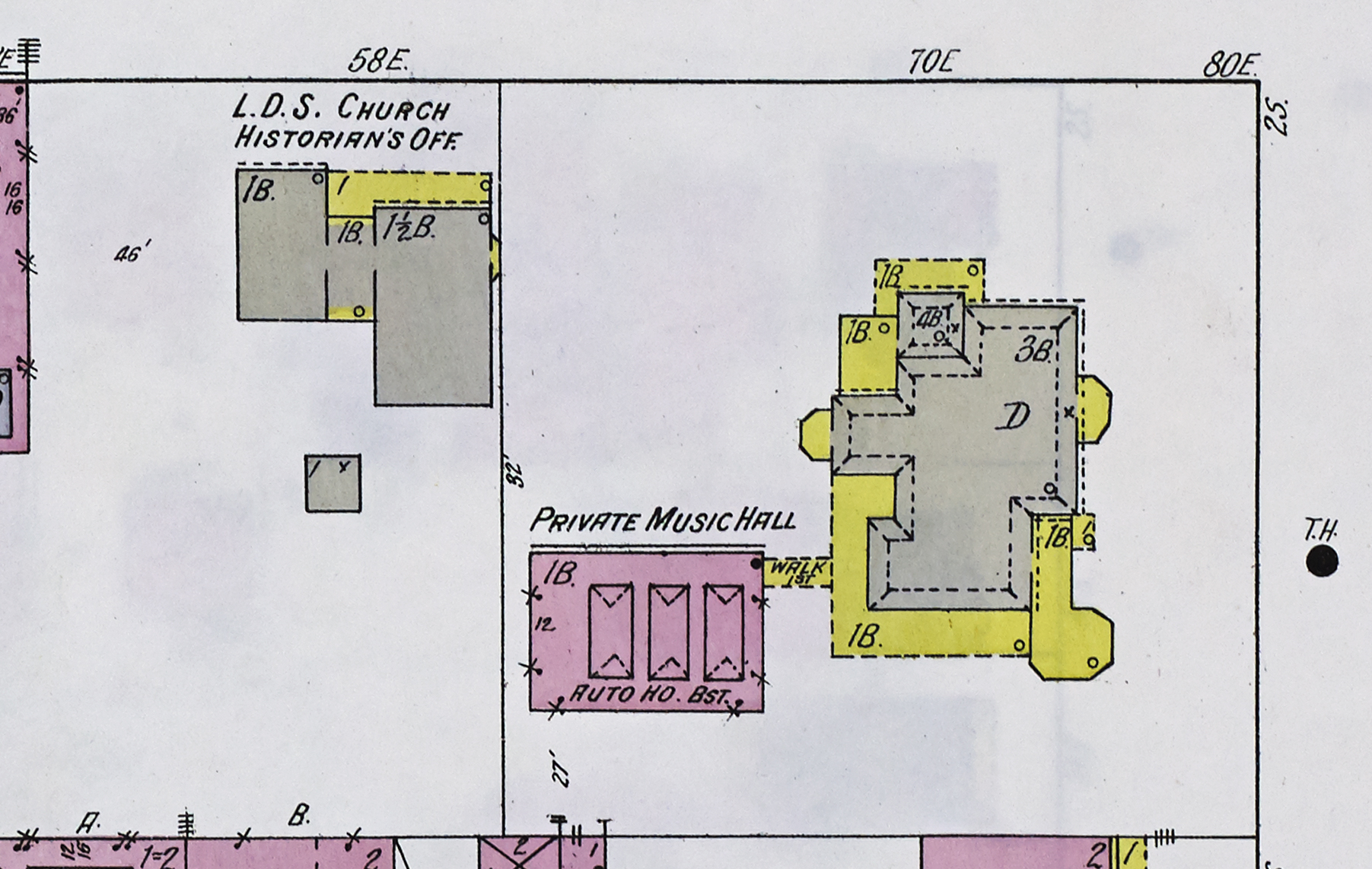
The Gardo House (at right) with newly completed west wing, as recorded on a 1911 Sanborn map

In 1894, the church's properties were returned, but church leaders decided not to use the house as an official residence. Instead they rented it to Isaac Trumbo and his wife, Emma. After the Trumbos returned to California, it was rented to Alfred W. McCune while he was having his own mansion built. In June 1899, the church purchased Young's Beehive House for use as the official residence of the president. No longer in need of the Gardo House, and heavily in debt, the church sold the home to Colonel Edward F. Holmes and his wife, Susanna Bransford Emery Holmes in 1901. They remodeled and redecorated the home, adding a west wing containing a garage on the first floor and a second floor that was used as an art gallery, ballroom and theater. The Holmes' left for California in 1917, after which they allowed the Red Cross to temporarily use the home.

The church purchased the mansion back from the Holmes in March 1920, and soon after opened the LDS School of Music and an art gallery in the home.

=== Demolition ===
In February 1921, the Federal Reserve's Salt Lake City branch acquired the mansion from the church for $115,000 (equivalent to $2,075,793 in 2025). The bank wanted to construct a new building on the site, as its quarters in the nearby Deseret National Bank building were too small. The Gardo House was demolished starting in November 1921 and the new bank building opened on February 21, 1927. Since 1986, the World Trade Center at City Creek has sat on the former location of the Gardo House.

== Controversies ==
=== "Amelia's Palace" ===
There were widespread rumors that the Gardo House was built for Harriet Amelia Folsom Young; allegedly she was Brigham Young's favorite wife. It was indeed Young's intent that Amelia would act as the official hostess for the building. According to his daughter Susa Young Gates, family members agreed that Amelia, who was young, childless, mannerly, and talented, was well suited to assume such a responsibility. Since the Gardo House's intent was to welcome visitors to and also to promote a positive perception of the Latter-day Saints, the claim that the house was built solely for Amelia's pleasure, as an act of favoritism, is a misinterpretation. It was, in fact, a specific calling for her with which the family apparently agreed.

Since Harriet Folsom Young's father was the chief architect it is reasonable to insist that there was extra attention given to the detail of the home by her father, though this would be the act of a loving father and not Brigham Young.

=== John Taylor ===
John Taylor succeeded Young as church president. His counselor George Q. Cannon and other church leaders suggested that Taylor occupy the Gardo House after its completion, but he repeatedly refused. However, when church members unanimously voted on April 9, 1879, to make the Gardo House the official parsonage for LDS church presidents, President Taylor reluctantly accepted their decision. In March 1885, soon after John Taylor's final public appearance, federal marshals made a massive raid on the mansion to capture him. This and subsequent raids were unsuccessful, and his "tough-minded sister ... often held raiding marshals and deputies at bay at the front door of the mansion, admitting no one unless he presented papers properly signed by a federal judge." After her brother's 1887 death, Agnes Taylor vacated the house.

Some believed that the Gardo House was built too extravagantly for church leaders to live in, considering the persecutions and generally humble origins of the church. For example, Rachel Emma Woolley Simmons recorded in her journal her personal discontent, citing the "... great expense to furnish it in the style it had to be ...". She also believed that Taylor was not pleased with moving, nor were his wives.

Additionally, the Salt Lake Daily Tribune was extremely critical of the affair and of the church in general. In an editorial published the day before the reception, the newspaper wrote, " The favored saints have received an invitation to call upon President John Taylor at the Amelia Palace tomorrow. ... We want the poor Mormons ... to mark the carpets, mirrors, the curtains and the rest, and then to go home and look at the squalor of their own homes, their unkempt wives, their miserable children growing up in despair and ignorance, and then to reflect how much better it would have been for them, instead of working hard for wages ... if they had only started out as did Uncle John, determined to serve God for nothing but hash." The Tribune went on to accuse the church of attempting "to build up an aristocracy in Utah, where the few are to rule in luxury, while the many, to support the luxury, are to toil and suffer."

On January 5, 1882, the Deseret News published a rebuttal to the Tribune's scathing editorial. The newspaper pointed out Taylor had taken up his residence in the Gardo House in response to the vote of the Mormon people and that he, as church president, should be taken care of considering the adversity which he personally endured, he was with Joseph Smith the day he was killed back in 1844, and hoped to do so at a level that those in "Church and State elsewhere" were.

Taylor himself also wrote a letter, published in the Deseret News, expressing his feelings about the situation. He reminded critics of his initial reluctance to move to the Gardo House and his concern that his occupancy of the mansion would place an intolerable barrier between him and church members. Taylor acknowledged that his family had also been opposed to the move, preferring their own homes and familiar surroundings. He explained he had eventually been persuaded that "Zion should become the praise of the whole earth, and that we in this land should take a prominent and leading part in the arts, sciences, architecture, literature, and in everything that would tend to ... exalt and ennoble Zion. [It is the president's duty] to take the lead in everything that is calculated to ... place Zion where she ought to be, first and foremost among the peoples."

Both newspapers were correct in implying that the issue of the Gardo House was much broader than the mere occupation of the mansion by a Mormon leader. To Mormons, who had celebrated their church's jubilee in April 1880, the house was a symbol of achievement. It was tangible proof that the persecutions and hardships they had endured over the past fifty years were not in vain. On the other hand, many non-Mormons viewed Taylor's installation in the home as a threat in the continuing struggle for economic and political supremacy.

== Prophecy ==
John Taylor's move to the Gardo House was regarded by some Mormons as the fulfillment of a prophecy. Legend had it that some years before, when Taylor's financial circumstances had been the poorest, Heber C. Kimball had boldly prophesied that Taylor would someday live in the largest and finest mansion in Salt Lake City.

== See also ==
- Brigham Young Forest Farmhouse
- Brigham Young Winter Home and Office
