= Kanosh (chief) =

Chief, Pahvant band of the Ute Tribe

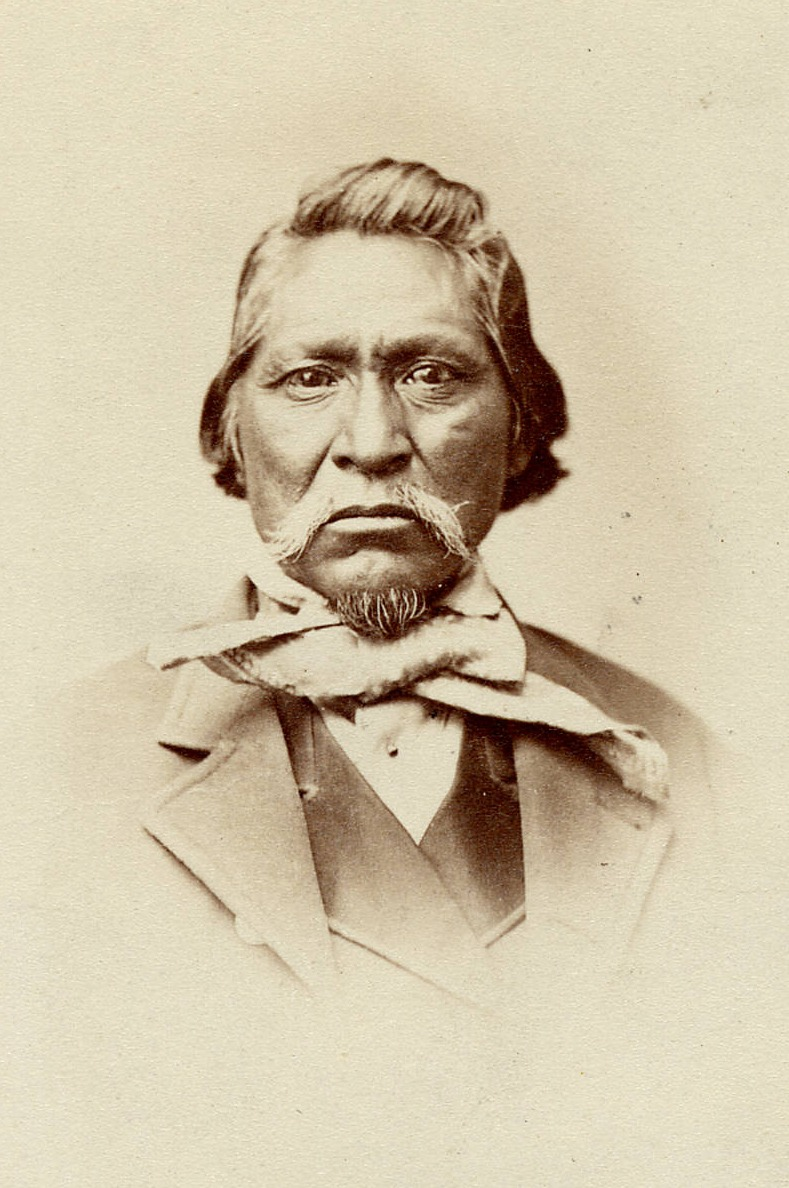
Portrait from ca. 1870.

Kanosh (1821 – December 24, 1884) was a nineteenth-century leader of the Pahvant band of the Ute Indians of what is now central Utah having succeeded the more belligerent Chuick as principal chief. His band had "a major camp at Corn Creek." He is remembered for having been "friendly toward early Mormon Pioneer settlers."

It is believed Kanosh was born near modern-day Spanish Fork, Utah but this claim is not certain.

Kanosh spoke Spanish, and according to an early 1900s source "learned to speak good English for an Indian. William V. Black, one of the pioneers of the Sevier and San Pete Valleys, was a lifelong friend of this chief."

Kanosh invited the Mormons to come and settle in his area where they founded the town of Kanosh. He "represented the Pahvant Utes at the signing of the treaty with Brigham Young which signalled the end of the Walker War in 1854," and was among the Utes who took up farming.

Kanosh joined the Church of Jesus Christ of Latter-day Saints in 1858. In 1874, Kanosh was ordained an elder by Dimick B. Huntington. Kanosh was one of the very earliest Native Americans to receive the endowment, a ceremony in Mormon temples.

Kanosh met with Brigham Young on September 1, 1857, to discuss strategy in relation to the Utah War.

At one time, widely circulating anti-Mormon literature speculated that Kanosh recruited the Utes who had participated in the Mountain Meadows massacre later that month, but no credible evidence has ever been presented to tie Kanosh to the event.

One of Kanosh's wives was Sally, a Southern Paiute who had been raised in Young's household. This relationship is a key part of why Kanosh's band worked so closely with the Latter-day Saints. Another of Kanosh's wives was a Paiute named Mary who had been raised by Latter-day Saints in Payson, Utah Territory. Kanosh built a regular cabin for her, whereas his other three wives lived in wikiups.

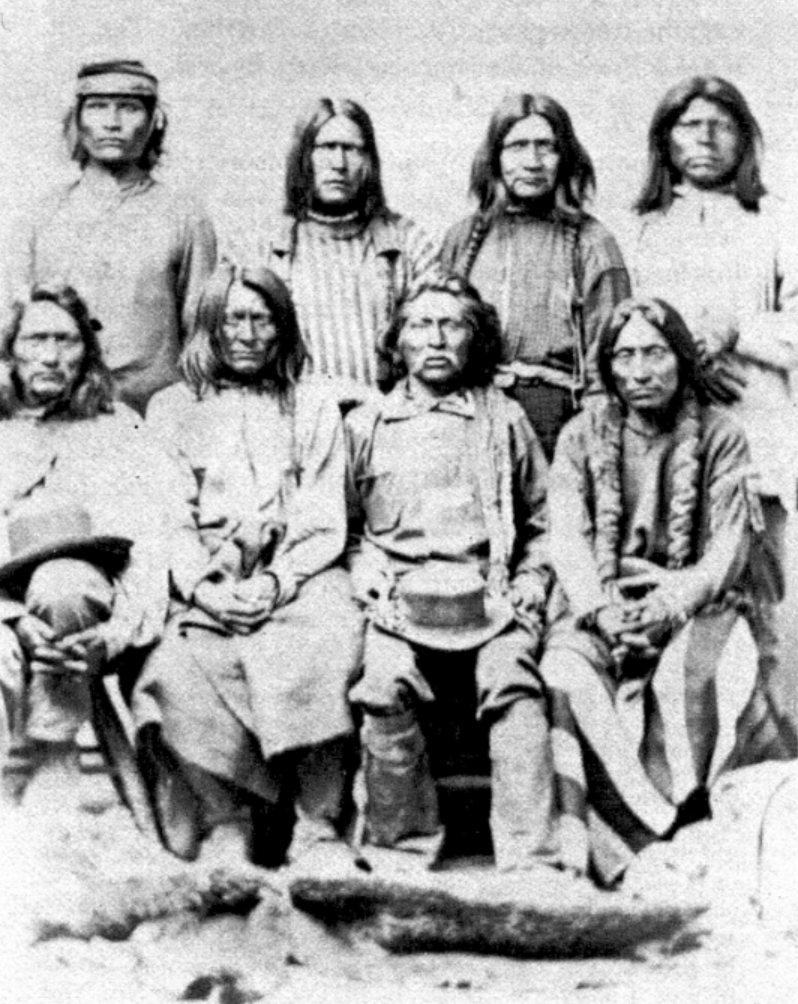
Chief Kanosh (bottom, second from right) and group of Piute Indians ca 1860s.

Kanosh and his fellow Pahvants were the only large group of Utes who did not participate in the Black Hawk War.

Kanosh died at the town of Kanosh, Utah Territory.
