= Sally Young Kanosh =

Kidnap victim (c.1840–1878)

- Kahpeputz
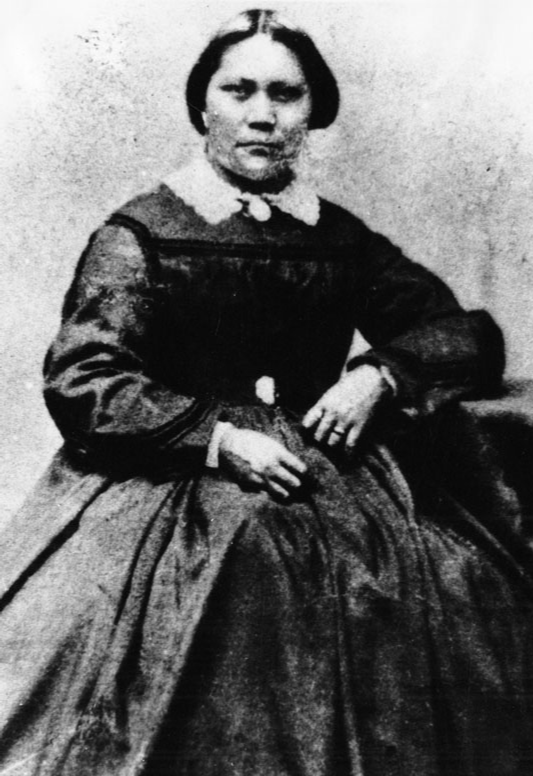
- Sally c. 1870s
- Born: Kahpeputz circa 1840
- Died: December 9, 1878
- Burial place: Kanosh, UT Cemetery; 38.7852785254307°N 112.4379007°W
- Employer: Brigham Young
- Known for: Servant of Brigham Young
- Spouse: Chief Kanosh

Sally Young Kanosh (originally known as Kahpeputz or Sally Indian) was a Bannock woman who was kidnapped from her home and sold by a slave-trader named Batiste to Charles Decker, Brigham Young's brother-in-law. She converted to Mormonism and worked in Brigham Young's house as either an indentured servant, adoptive daughter or plural wife. She married Ute chief Kanosh as a plural wife. There is some evidence that she might have been killed by another wife of Kanosh who was jealous of her. In 1906, Susa Young Gates wrote about Sally, who portrayed Young's relationship with Sally as the ideal relationship between whites and Native Americans, which helped put Sally into the collective memory of second generation Mormons in Utah.

== Purchase ==
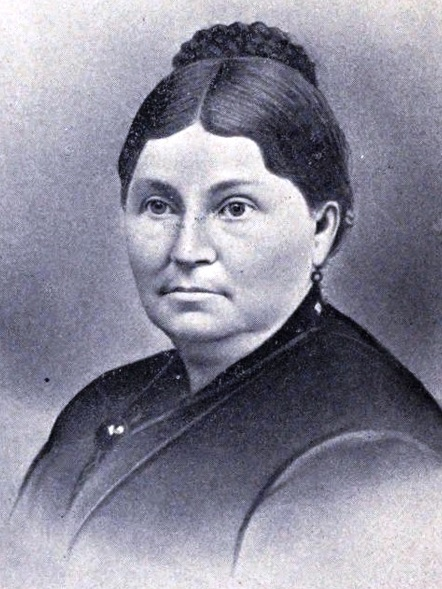
Charles Decker gave Sally to Clara Young after he bought her for a rifle.

In 1847, Kahpeputz was kidnapped and tortured when she was around seven years old. There are indications that she might have been the daughter of a chief. Her kidnappers cut her body with knives and poured hot ashes on her wounds. A slave trader by the name of Batiste took her and another boy to sell to the Salt Lake Valley Fort, where Mormon pioneers had recently arrived. Initially, the Mormons refused to purchase the slaves, so Batiste killed the boy and threatened to kill Kahpeputz as well. Charles Decker bought Kahpeputz in exchange for his rifle. He then gave Kahpeputz to his sister, Clara Decker Young, wife of Brigham Young.

== Life with the Young family ==
When Kahpeputz was given to Clara, Clara renamed her Sally. In 1849, she received a priesthood blessing under the hands of Zina D. H. Young. She was promised that she would shortly see her mother and sisters. Sally grew up in the Lion House. It is unclear the relationship between Clara and Sally. Susa Young Gates says that Sally was adopted as a daughter of the Youngs. However, Turner presumes that she was a servant, since she worked as a servant. Unlike other children, she was not taught how to read or write. While the rest of the family slept upstairs, she slept in the basement near the kitchen. She worked long hours alongside other servants preparing food for the rest of Young's family. The 1860 census gave her the name Sally Indian and listed her among the servants to the Young family. Writer, Sandra Jones, used Sally as an example of how adopted Indian children were not treated as equals to white children. There is indication that Sally might have been married and sealed to Brigham Young as a plural wife.

== Marriage to Kanosh ==
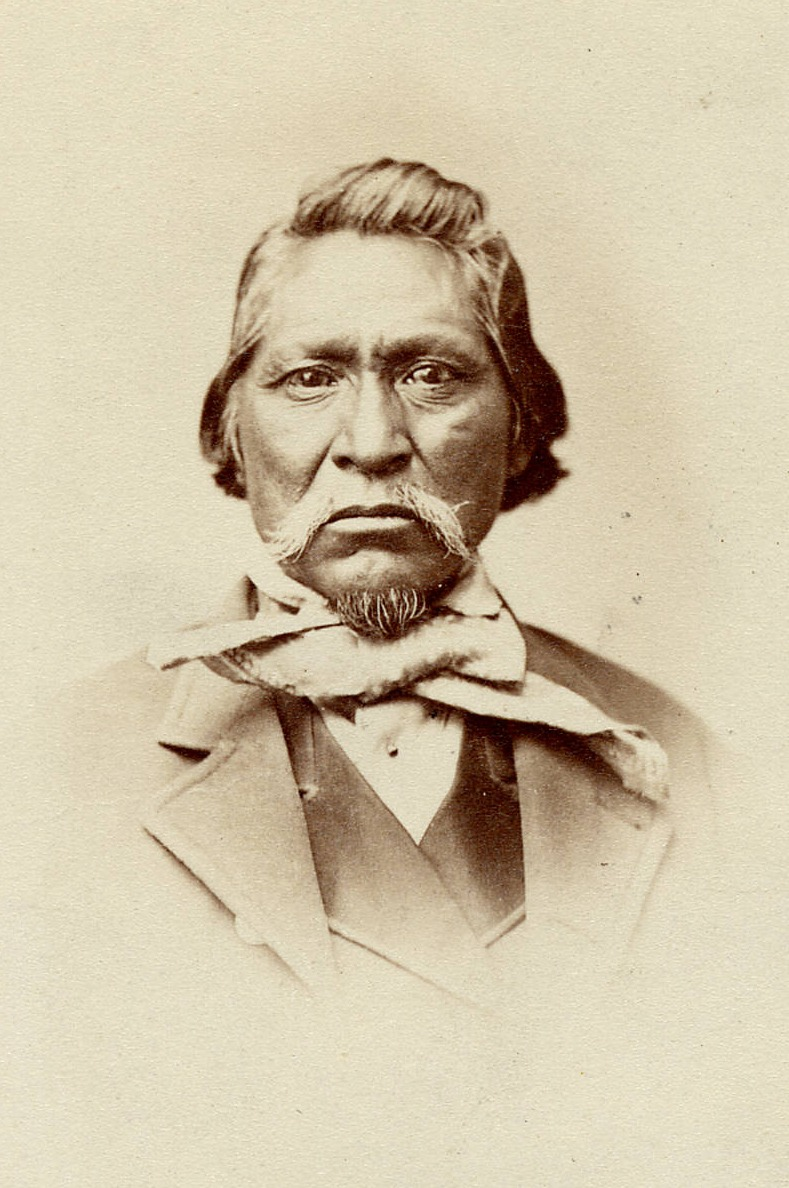
Sally became a plural wife of Kanosh

During one of the meetings between Brigham Young and Kanosh, Kanosh saw Sally and offered a band of ponies for her. She was insulted and refused. On June 8, 1877, Sally and Kanosh were married by Dimick Huntington. They then lived in central Utah, in what is now Kanosh, Utah. It is not clear why Sally married Kanosh. Gates indicates that Sally was given a choice, and after an initial rejection changed her mind when Kanosh rescued her from Walkara. Mueller indicates there is no evidence that Walkara ever took Sally or that she chose to marry Kanosh. He believes she was married to strengthen the alliance between Kanosh and Brigham Young, and that Sally was either unwilling or reluctant. Ten years after her marriage, Sally died. There is some evidence that she might have been killed by another wife of Kanosh who was jealous of her.

== See also ==
- Lamanites
- Act for the relief of Indian Slaves and Prisoners
