= William Hooper Young =

American murderer

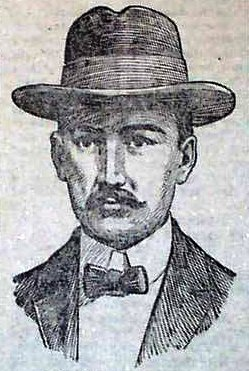
- Drawing of William Hooper Young in the September 23, 1902 edition of the Wellsville Daily Reporter (Wellsville, New York)

Personal details
- Born: March 13, 1871; Salt Lake City, Utah Territory, United States
- Died: after 1938
- Known For: Convicted of the "Pulitzer Murder" in New York City
- Parents: John Willard Young
- Relatives: Brigham Young (Grandfather)

William Hooper Young (March 13, 1871 – after 1938) was a convicted American murderer. In 1903, he was convicted of the "Pulitzer Murder" in New York City and was sentenced to life imprisonment.

== Early life ==
Hooper Young was born in Salt Lake City, Utah Territory. He was the son of John Willard Young, an apostle in the Church of Jesus Christ of Latter-day Saints (LDS Church). Hooper Young was a grandson of Brigham Young, the president of the LDS Church and founder of Salt Lake City.

As a young adult, Hooper Young became an elder in the LDS Church, and in 1891 and 1892 he was a Mormon missionary in the eastern United States. In 1893, Young left Salt Lake City and began moving from city to city and from job to job. During his travels, he lived in Seattle; San Francisco; Portland, Oregon; Chicago; New York City; Washington, D.C.; and Hoboken, New Jersey. Young drifted away from the LDS Church and according to his relatives in Utah Territory, had become a morphine addict. There were also rumors that he had left Salt Lake City because he had killed someone.

== Pulitzer murder ==
=== Scene of the crime: the Young apartment ===
On September 19, 1902, the body of Anna Pulitzer was found in the Morris Canal outside Jersey City, New Jersey. Her abdomen had been stabbed and there was bruising on her head. Pulitzer was married but had been arrested a number of times for solicitation of prostitution. A New York cabman was found who claimed that a few days previously he had taken Pulitzer and an unknown man to an apartment in New York City that was the home of Young's father, John Willard Young. In the apartment, police found empty beer bottles, a bottle with chloral hydrate crystals in it, a carving knife with blood on it, and blood on bedsheets, in a closet, under the kitchen sink, and on the floor and walls. The words "blood atonement" were scrawled in a notebook, and underneath were several references to verses in the Bible that discuss atonement for crime. It was determined that Pulitzer had died of a drug overdose from chloral poisoning and that the head bruising and abdomen stabbing occurred after her death.

=== Hooper Young linked to death ===
It was discovered that John Willard Young had been in France when Pulitzer had disappeared, but that Young's son Hooper used the apartment when he was away. Hooper Young was arrested in Derby, Connecticut, where he was found drunk and dressed like a hobo. Initially, Young denied his identity, but eventually he admitted who he was. Young claimed that he, Pulitzer, and a third person named Charles Simpson Eiling had been in the apartment on the night of Pulitzer's death, and that when he had temporarily left the apartment to purchase whiskey, he returned to find Pulitzer dead. Young said that Eiling had murdered Pulitzer and that he had decided to help Eiling hide the body because he was afraid of disgracing his father when the matter became public. Young said he tried to cut Pulitzer's body up into small pieces, but that after he made a cut to the abdomen, he lost his nerve and was not able to do it. He did not admit to dumping Pulitzer's body in the canal, but he indicated that he was aware of what had happened to the body. A search was made for Charles Eiling, but no one of that name could be located.

=== Motive speculation ===
When the New York newspapers discovered that the prime suspect in Pulitzer's murder was the grandson of Brigham Young, much speculation began about the motive for the murder. Because of references to blood atonement that had been found in the apartment, some speculated that Pulitzer was killed in accordance with the Mormon principle of "blood atonement", whereby a person atones for sinful behavior through the shedding of their own blood. Others suggested that Young and Pulitzer had had an illicit affair years earlier, when Young was a Mormon missionary in Perth Amboy, New Jersey, which was Pulitzer's hometown. The actual motive for the murder was never determined.

=== Murder trial and conviction ===
Young's murder trial began in New York City on February 4, 1903. Young pleaded not guilty. His trial commenced, but on February 10, Young told the court that he was willing to plead guilty to second degree murder. The judge accepted the plea and sentenced him to hard labor in state prison for the duration of his natural life. The judge stated that he was not willing to impose the death penalty because medical experts had suggested that Young was probably medically—though not legally—insane. Because a full trial was not completed, Young's motive or the truth behind his claims about another man being involved were never fully examined in court. Young served his sentence at Sing Sing in Ossining, New York.

== Parole and later life ==
In early 1924, Young was paroled. He was living with his father in New York City when his father died in February 1924.

In 1928 Hooper Young was in Fair Oaks, California reportedly trying to locate one of his half-sisters.

A Social Security claim was made by a William Hooper Young in June 1937 on an account that listed his parents as John W Young and Elizabeth Canfield.

Register, State Prison at Folsom: #21856. He entered Folsom Prison on July 20, 1938 for Violation of Section 288a PC + Prior. Los Angeles County. Sentence 0-15 years. AKA: William Hooper Young. Description: white, 5' 8 3/4", slender build, florid complexion, brown eyes, grey hair-balding. Prior: New York State Prison, Sing Sing. He died at Folsom Prison on December 6, 1939. Age at death: 68

== In popular culture ==
In Brian Evenson's 2006 novel, The Open Curtain, the protagonist is a disaffected Mormon teenager who obsessively researches Young's involvement in Pulitzer's murder.
