= William V. Black =

American Mormon leader

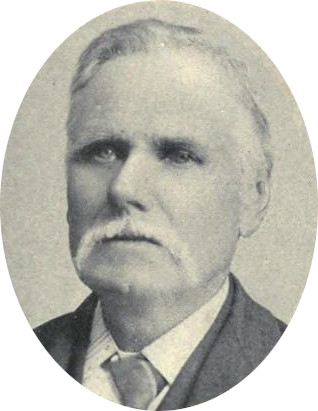
- Born: February 27, 1832; Lisburn, Ireland
- Died: April 1, 1927 (aged 95)
- Known for: Early settler of Spring City, Utah

William Valentine Black (27 February 1832 – 1 April 1927) was an American Mormon leader and one of the early settlers of Manti, Spring City, Rockville, and Deseret, Utah. He was also a close friend of Chief Kanosh the leader of the Pahvant band of the Ute people. He was also the first branch president of the LDS Church in Deseret, Utah.

Black was born in Lisburn, Ireland. He "was one of several Irishmen instrumental in the formation of the dam and irrigation systems in Utah. He assisted in locating dams and canals at Abraham, Oasis, Hinckley, and Deseret and was also president of the Deseret Irrigation Company in southern Utah."

William's brother, Joseph Smith Black, was only the second white man to explore Zion National Park, and the first white person to settle in the Park in 1861.
