= Brigham Young Jr. =

American religious leader (1836–1903)

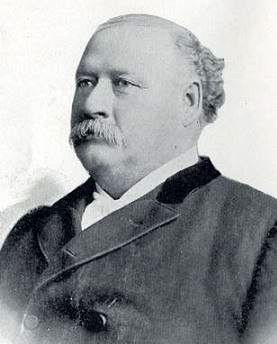
- Young in 1900

President of the Quorum of the Twelve Apostles
- October 17, 1901 – April 11, 1903
- Predecessor: Joseph F. Smith
- Successor: Francis M. Lyman
- December 9, 1899 – October 10, 1901
- Predecessor: Franklin D. Richards
- Successor: Joseph F. Smith
- End reason: Return of Joseph F. Smith to Quorum upon death of Lorenzo Snow and dissolution of First Presidency

Quorum of the Twelve Apostles
- August 29, 1877 – April 11, 1903

Assistant Counselor in the First Presidency
- May 9, 1874 – August 29, 1877
- Called by: Brigham Young
- End reason: Dissolution of First Presidency upon death of Brigham Young

Counselor in the First Presidency
- June 8, 1873 – May 9, 1874
- Called by: Brigham Young
- End reason: Called as Assistant Counselor in the First Presidency

Quorum of the Twelve Apostles
- October 9, 1868 – June 8, 1873
- Called by: Brigham Young
- End reason: Called as Counselor in the First Presidency

LDS Church Apostle
- February 4, 1864 – April 11, 1903
- Called by: Brigham Young
- Reason: Brigham Young's discretion
- Reorganization at end of term: George Albert Smith ordained

Personal details
- Born: Brigham Young Jr. December 18, 1836; Kirtland, Ohio, U.S.
- Died: April 11, 1903 (aged 66); Salt Lake City, Utah, U.S.
- Resting place: Salt Lake City Cemetery; 40.777°N 111.858°W
- Spouse(s): Catherine C. Spencer; Helen E. Armstrong; Jane Carrington; Abigail Stevens; Rhoda E. Perkins
- Parents: Brigham Young; Mary Ann Angell

Brigham Young Jr. (December 18, 1836 – April 11, 1903) served as president of the Quorum of the Twelve Apostles of the Church of Jesus Christ of Latter-day Saints (LDS Church) from 1899 until his death. His tenure was interrupted for one week in 1901 when Joseph F. Smith was the president of the Quorum.

== Early life ==
Young was born in Kirtland, Ohio, the son of Brigham Young and Mary Ann Angell. Young's twin sister, Mary, died at age seven from the effects of injuries received at age two in a wagon accident. At age twelve, Young drove an ox cart along the Mormon Trail, reaching Salt Lake City in 1848. Young served as a guard and scout in the following years, operating in Salt Lake Valley and the surrounding canyons.

On November 15, 1855, Young married Catherine Curtis Spencer, a daughter of Orson Spencer, with exactly the same name as her mother.

In Utah Territory, Young became a member of the reconstituted Nauvoo Legion. He was involved in the rescue of the Willie and Martin companies of Mormon handcart pioneers. He also served in the Utah War with the troops that worked to halt the advance of Johnston's Army.

In 1861, Young was made a member of the Salt Lake Stake high council.

== Early years as a general authority ==
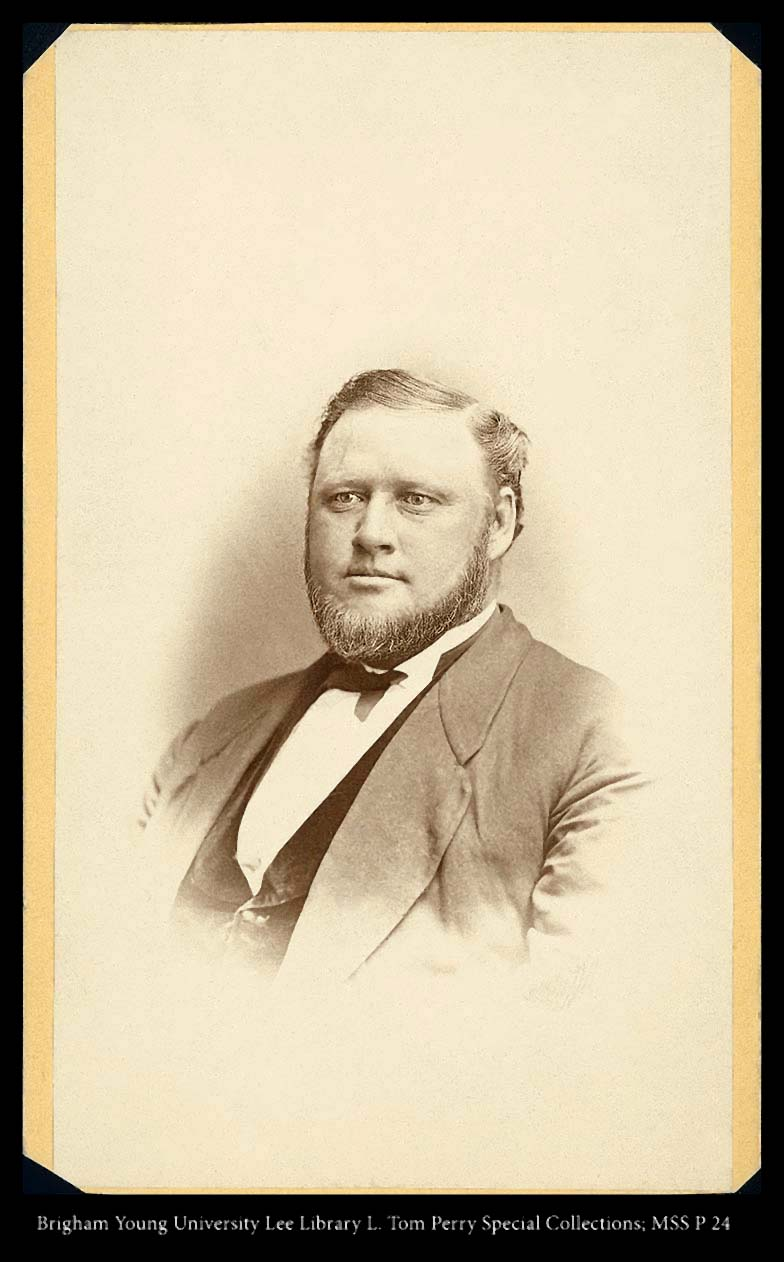
Brigham Young, Jr. between 1870 and 1875

Brigham Young Sr. ordained three of his sons, Brigham Young Jr., Joseph Angell Young and John Willard Young, as apostles in 1864, without public announcement or adding them to the Quorum of the Twelve Apostles.

Unlike his brothers, Brigham Young Jr. would later become part of the Quorum of the Twelve Apostles four years later in 1868, after the death of Heber C. Kimball and George A. Smith joining the First Presidency. In 1868, he was also a Representative to the Territory of Utah Legislative Assembly. Young Jr. also served as a counselor to his father in the First Presidency of the church from April 8, 1873, until his father's death on August 29, 1877.

== Missions to Europe ==
From 1862 to 1863, Young served as a church missionary in England, spending most of the time in London. During this time, he also accompanied Joseph F. Smith on a trip to Paris, France.

In 1864, Young returned to Europe, this time with his wife, Catherine (Orson Spencer's daughter), as his companion. He was an assistant to mission president Daniel H. Wells. In 1865, when Wells left for Utah, Young succeeded him as president of the European Mission. Brigham and Catherine's son, Joseph Angel Young II, was born in England in 1866 while he was still serving as mission president.

As president of the church's European Mission in 1866 and 1867, Young preached in France, Switzerland, Germany, Denmark, Sweden, Norway, Russia, the United Kingdom, and Ireland. Young also oversaw the emigration of British Latter-day Saints to Utah Territory. It was from a conversation as Young was about to return to Utah at the end of his time as mission president that Charles W. Penrose wrote the hymn, "Beautiful Zion For Me".

From October 1890 until February 1893 Young served for a second time as president of the European Mission. The mission was headquartered in Liverpool, and Young directly supervised missionary work in the British Isles, while also serving as a leader over the mission presidents of the various missions on the European continent.

== Colonization and church assignment in America ==
In the western United States, Young was involved in the colonization of Cache Valley, southern Utah and the extension of Mormon settlements into New Mexico and Arizona. Young was also involved at times with the Mormon colonies in Mexico.

In 1867, Young was involved with the formation of the Deseret Sunday School Union to provide centralized direction to the Sunday schools of the church.

During 1868, Young acted as his father's agent in finding workers for the Utah portion of the First transcontinental railroad.

From 1869 until 1877, Young presided over the Latter-day Saints in Cache Valley, closely assisted by William B. Preston, who was serving as the regional presiding bishop. During this time, Young co-owned a feed and livery stable in Soda Springs, Idaho, with Solomon Hale.

In 1877, Young, Erastus Snow and Wilford Woodruff dedicated parts of the St. George Temple.

From 1877 to 1880, Young and George Q. Cannon served as editors of the Deseret News.

In 1878, Young and Moses Thatcher selected the site for the Latter-day Saint settlement in the Star Valley of Wyoming. In August 1878, Young dedicated the valley as a place for the gathering of the Latter-day Saints.

In February 1883, Young went on a tour among the Navajo and Hopi peoples with many other church leaders, including Heber J. Grant.

In 1883, Young convinced the residents of Jonesville, Arizona, to rename it Lehi. It is today part of Mesa, Arizona.

== Family ==
Young practiced plural marriage. His first wife was Catherine Curtis Spencer. Among their children was Brigham Spencer Young, who would later serve as president of the Northwestern States Mission of the church.

In 1857, Young married his second wife, Jane Carrington, a daughter of Albert Carrington.

Young's wife Abigail Stevens was one of his younger wives. Their daughter Klara Young Cheney, born in Fruitland, New Mexico, in 1894, turned 100 years old in 1994. Abigail and Brigham Jr.'s last daughter, Marian Young, was also born at Fruitland on January 25, 1899. She died on November 22, 2004, less than two months short of her 106th birthday. She was the last grandchild of Brigham Young to die.

== Politics ==
Young served several terms in the Utah Territorial Legislature.

== President of the Quorum of the Twelve Apostles ==
Young was ordained an apostle before Joseph F. Smith but was not placed in the Quorum of the Twelve Apostles until after Joseph F. Smith. It was not until 1900 that a clear decision was made which gave Smith seniority in the Quorum of the Twelve Apostles over Young, since Smith had been a member of the First Presidency since becoming an apostle. Young had served as the President of the Quorum of the Twelve Apostles since the previous president, Franklin D. Richards, had died on December 9, 1899.

When church president Lorenzo Snow died on October 10, 1901, Smith served as President of the Quorum until he was made church president on October 17, 1901. The death of Snow dissolved the First Presidency, returning First Counselor Joseph F. Smith to the Quorum of the Twelve as President of the Quorum. The LDS Church at that time did not draw a distinction between President of the Quorum of the Twelve Apostles and Acting President of the Quorum of the Twelve Apostles. In that time, the person who in the modern church would be called the Acting President was set apart as the President of the Quorum. The second-most senior apostle was not set apart as the President of the Quorum if they were a member of the First Presidency, which Smith was. One week later, Smith was made President of the Church and Young again became President of the Quorum. Therefore, when Smith became president, Young again assumed the position of President of the Quorum of the Twelve. Young is the only person to have served two non-consecutive terms as President of the Quorum.

== Death ==
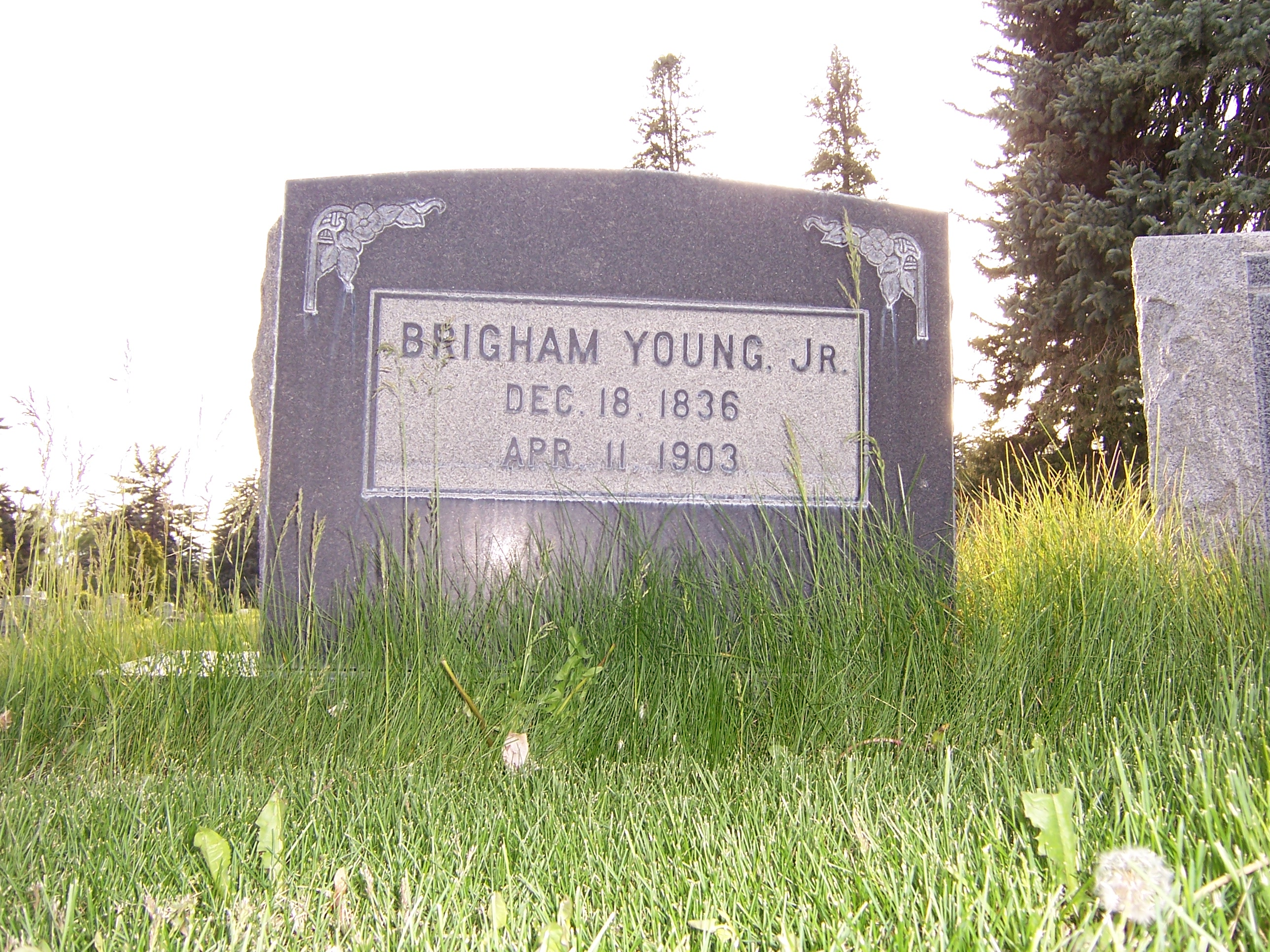
Brigham Young Jr.'s grave marker

Young died on April 11, 1903 in Salt Lake City, Utah at age 66. He was buried at Salt Lake City Cemetery.

The Church of Jesus Christ of Latter-day Saints titles
Preceded by Joseph F. Smith	Quorum of the Twelve Apostles; 1868 – April 8, 1873; August 29, 1877 – April 11, 1903	Succeeded by Albert Carrington
Preceded by Franklin D. Richards	President of the Quorum of the Twelve Apostles; December 9, 1899 – October 10, 1901	Succeeded by Joseph F. Smith
Preceded by Joseph F. Smith	President of the Quorum of the Twelve Apostles; October 17, 1901 – April 11, 1903	Succeeded by Francis M. Lyman
