= John Willard Young =

American religious leader (1844–1924)

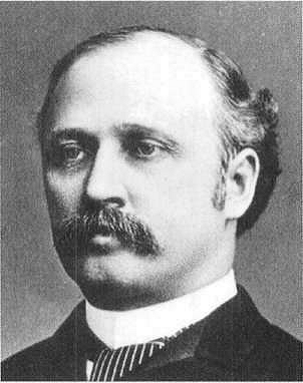

Counselor to the Quorum of the Twelve Apostles
- October 6, 1877 – October 3, 1891
- Called by: John Taylor
- End reason: Resignation (formally released on October 6, 1891)

First Counselor in the First Presidency
- October 8, 1876 – August 29, 1877
- Called by: Brigham Young
- Predecessor: George A. Smith
- Successor: George Q. Cannon
- End reason: Dissolution of First Presidency upon death of Brigham Young

Assistant Counselor in the First Presidency
- May 9, 1874 – October 8, 1876
- Called by: Brigham Young
- End reason: Called as First Counselor in the First Presidency

Counselor in the First Presidency
- June 8, 1873 – May 9, 1874
- Called by: Brigham Young
- End reason: Called as Assistant Counselor in the First Presidency

LDS Church Apostle
- November 22, 1855 – February 12, 1924
- Called by: Brigham Young
- Reason: Brigham Young's discretion
- Reorganization at end of term: None

Personal details
- Born: John Willard Young; October 1, 1844; Nauvoo, Illinois, U.S.
- Died: February 12, 1924 (aged 79); New York City, U.S.
- Children: William Hooper Young
- Parents: Brigham Young and Mary Ann Angel

John Willard Young (October 1, 1844 – February 12, 1924) was a leader in the Church of Jesus Christ of Latter-day Saints (LDS Church). He is one of the few individuals to have been an LDS Church apostle and member of the First Presidency without ever being a member of the Quorum of the Twelve Apostles.

== Early life and apostolic ordination ==
Young was born in Nauvoo, Illinois to Brigham Young and Mary Ann Angell. As a young boy, John traveled with the Mormon pioneers from Illinois to the Salt Lake Valley.

Young was privately ordained an apostle by his father on November 22, 1855, when he was eleven, without a public announcement or being added to the Quorum of the Twelve Apostles. Young's ordination was reconfirmed on February 4, 1864, when his brothers Brigham Young, Jr. and Joseph Angell Young were ordained apostles by their father. However, none of them became members of the Quorum of the Twelve Apostles upon their ordination because the Quorum already had twelve members. Although Brigham Jr. eventually became a member of the Quorum of the Twelve, John and Joseph never did.

== Activity in western territories ==
In 1869 Young opened the "Salt Lake City Museum and Menagerie," which was the predecessor of the Deseret Museum. He was also involved with the construction of a railroad in Arizona Territory.

== LDS Church service ==
=== First Presidency ===
On April 8, 1873, Brigham Young added John, Brigham Jr., George Q. Cannon, Lorenzo Snow, and Albert Carrington as additional counselors to him in the First Presidency. After Young's first counselor, George A. Smith, died in September 1875, John Willard Young was called as first counselor to his father on October 8, 1876. Young served in this capacity until the First Presidency was dissolved by his father's death less than a year later on August 29, 1877. During his time in the First Presidency, John Willard Young never spent much time in Salt Lake City attending to church leadership duties; since 1863 he had preferred living in New York City, where he was engaged in a number of business ventures that ultimately failed and resulted in him assuming a large amount of debt.

=== Counselor to the Twelve Apostles ===
Having never been a member of the Quorum of the Twelve but holding the priesthood office of apostle, Young was called as a counselor to the Quorum of the Twelve Apostles on October 6, 1877. However, Young's business practices and practice of living in New York City soon brought him into conflict with other church authorities. At a church general conference on April 6, 1881, Young's name was withheld from the names of general authorities who were presented for sustaining. Between 1881 and 1885, he was tried before the Quorum of the Twelve on three separate occasions; each time he was reconciled with the Twelve and he retained his position. In 1888, Joseph F. Smith accused Young of unethically using church funds to maintain a lavish lifestyle, and by April 1889 the First Presidency and Quorum of the Twelve were discussing removing Young from his position.

Young resigned from his position on October 3, 1891; Young was aware that on that date the First Presidency and Quorum of the Twelve Apostles were again discussing possible release from his position. After Young's resignation, he was formally released as a counselor to the Twelve at a conference of the church October 6, 1891.

=== Denial of church presidency ===
Although he lived another 33 years, Young never again served as a general authority of the LDS Church, though he remained an apostle for the rest of his life. On December 9, 1899, apostle Franklin D. Richards died. Richards had been the President of the Quorum of the Twelve Apostles and the second-most senior apostle in the church. The death of Richards left Young as the second-most senior apostle in the church. Although Young did not become the President of the Twelve, under the then-existing rules of presidential succession in the church, Young would become the church president when Lorenzo Snow died, since Snow was the only living person who had been ordained an apostle prior to Young. Snow was 85 years old and in poor health, while Young was only 55 years old; it therefore appeared to many that Young would be the next president of the church.

However, many of the general authorities disliked Young and felt that his succession to the presidency would be a disaster for the church. On March 31, 1900, the First Presidency—which consisted of Snow, Cannon, and Joseph F. Smith—changed the policy of presidential succession. The new president of the church would no longer be the person who had been an ordained apostle the longest; rather, the new president of the church would be the person who had been a member of the Quorum of the Twelve Apostles for the longest period of time. Since Young had never been a member of the Quorum of the Twelve, he could not become the president of the church if Snow died. On April 5, 1900, the First Presidency and the Quorum of the Twelve unanimously approved the new policy.

On October 10, 1901, Snow died. Five days later, Young arrived in Salt Lake City from New York City, possibly with the intent of assuming the presidency of the church. However, due to the new policy, Joseph F. Smith was ordained the new church president on October 17, 1901. Young returned to New York City, where he lived for the rest of his life. After he died in New York City, Young was buried at Salt Lake City Cemetery.

== Later life ==
After returning to New York City, Young was employed as an elevator operator in an exclusive hotel where he had once lived. In 1902 and 1903, his son, Hooper Young, was involved in a sensational murder investigation and trial after it was determined that a woman had died in John Willard Young's apartment while he was in France on business. The "Pulitzer Murder" case ultimately resulted in Hooper pleading guilty to second degree murder and being sentenced to life imprisonment in Sing Sing prison. Hooper's conviction had a devastating effect on John Willard, who had initially believed that his son was innocent. John Willard Young continued to attend a branch of the LDS Church in the city for the rest of his life, and he died of cancer in New York City at the age of 79.

== See also ==
- San Francisco Peaks
- United States Shipbuilding Company

== Notes ==
The Church of Jesus Christ of Latter-day Saints titles
New creation	Counselor to the Quorum of the Twelve Apostles; October 6, 1877 – October 3, 1891; With: Daniel H. Wells	End of position
Preceded by George A. Smith	First Counselor in the First Presidency; October 8, 1876 – August 29, 1877	Succeeded by George Q. Cannon
New creation	Assistant Counselor in the First Presidency; October 8, 1876 – August 29, 1877; Counselor in the First Presidency; June 8, 1873 – May 9, 1874; With: George Q. Cannon, Brigham Young, Jr., Lorenzo Snow, Albert Carrington	Succeeded by George Q. Cannon, Brigham Young, Jr., Lorenzo Snow, Albert Carrington
Preceded by Joseph F. Smith	Counselor in the First Presidency; June 8, 1873 – May 9, 1874; With: Joseph F. Smith, George Q. Cannon, Brigham Young, Jr., Lorenzo Snow, Albert Carrington	Succeeded by Joseph F. Smith
