= Joseph Angell Young =

American politician and religious leader (1834–1875)

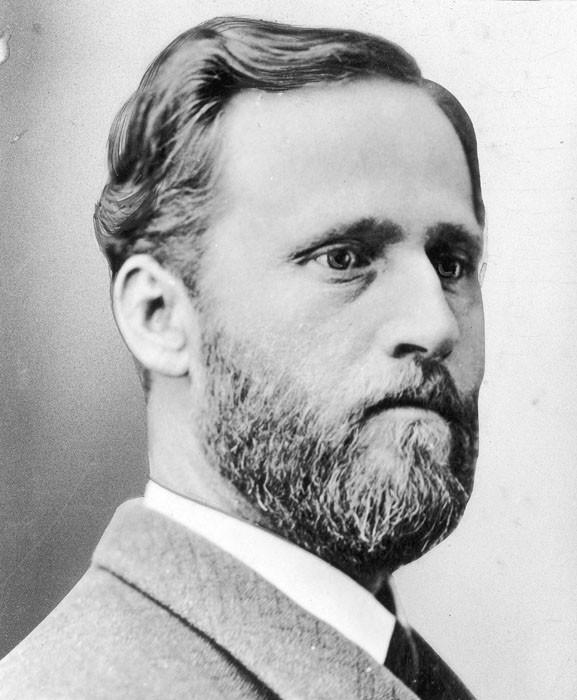

LDS Church Apostle
- February 4, 1864 – August 5, 1875
- Reason: Brigham Young's discretion
- Reorganization at end of term: None

Personal details
- Born: Joseph Angell Young; October 14, 1834; Kirtland, Ohio, U.S.
- Died: August 5, 1875 (aged 40); Manti, Utah Territory, U.S.
- Resting place: Mormon Pioneer Memorial; 40°46′13.12″N 111°53′8.23″W

Joseph Angell Young (October 14, 1834 – August 5, 1875) was an apostle of the Church of Jesus Christ of Latter-day Saints (LDS Church). Young is one of the few Latter-day Saints in history to have been ordained to the office of apostle without ever becoming a member of the Quorum of the Twelve Apostles or the First Presidency.

== Early life ==
Young was born in Kirtland, Ohio, the eldest child of Brigham Young and Mary Ann Angell. He was baptized into the church in Kirtland by his father at the age of eight. In 1847, Young travelled with his family and a group of Mormon pioneers from Nauvoo, Illinois to the Salt Lake Valley.

== Career ==
Young was a missionary for the LDS Church in England from 1854 to 1856, working in Liverpool, Manchester, and Bradford. Upon his return to Utah Territory, Young married Margaret Whitehead, a native of England. She became his second wife.

Over the next few years, Young was involved in the lumber industry, running several sawmills in canyons by Salt Lake City. He was also one of the main promoters of the Utah Central Railroad.

In 1864, Brigham Young privately ordained two of his sons—Brigham Young, Jr. and Joseph Angell—to the priesthood office of apostle, without a public announcement or adding them to the Quorum of the Twelve Apostles. Brigham had also previously ordained another son, John Willard Young, as an apostle in 1855. Unlike his two brothers, Joseph Angell would never become a member of the First Presidency nor, like Brigham Jr., a member of the Quorum of the Twelve Apostles. Joseph Angell was active in territorial politics and was a member of the Utah Territory’s House of Representatives in its 6th, 11th, and 12th sessions, and was a member of the territory's upper chamber in its 14th through 21st sessions.

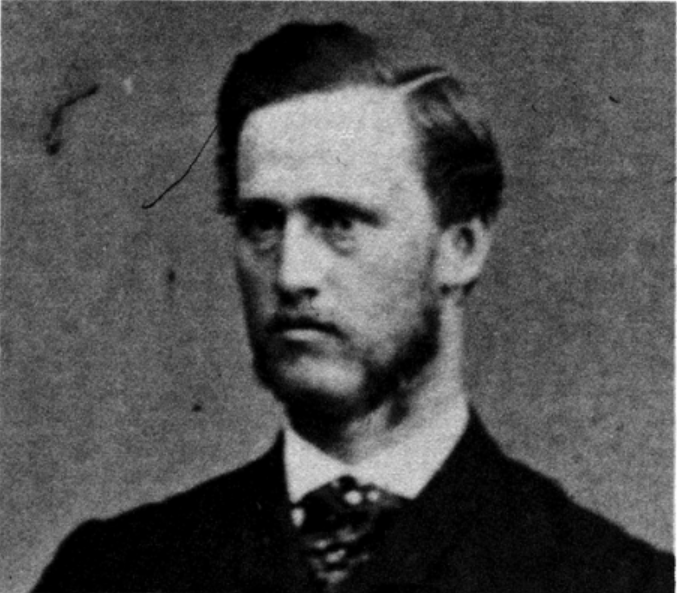
Joseph Angell Young served as a scribe of Brigham Young.

In 1872, Young was called to preside over the Sevier District of the church in present-day central Utah. He became the first stake president of the Sevier Stake when it was organized in 1874. Young served only a few months before dying unexpectedly in Manti, Utah Territory, at the age of forty. At the time, he was working on plan specifications for the Manti Utah Temple. He was buried in the Brigham Young Cemetery in Salt Lake City.

== Children ==
Young is the father of Richard W. Young, who was an associate justice for the Supreme Court of the former U.S. unincorporated territory of the Philippine Islands between 1899 and 1901.
