= Mary Ann Angell =

Second woman married to Latter Day Saint leader Brigham Young

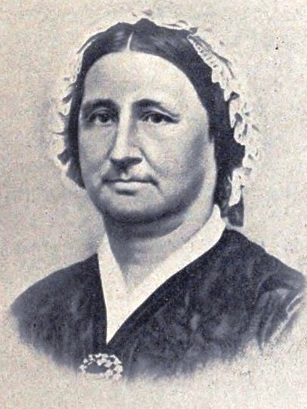
- Photo of Angell in Pictures and biographies of Brigham Young and his wives, 1887

Personal details
- Born: Mary Ann Angell; June 8, 1803; Seneca, New York, U.S.
- Died: June 27, 1882 (aged 79); Salt Lake City, Utah Territory, U.S.
- Resting place: Brigham Young Family Memorial Cemetery; 40°46′13″N 111°53′08″W
- Spouse(s): Brigham Young
- Children: 6, including Joseph, Brigham Jr., and John

Mary Ann Angell Young (June 8, 1803 – June 27, 1882) was the second woman married to Brigham Young, who served as president of the Church of Jesus Christ of Latter-day Saints (LDS Church). Young's first wife had died in 1832, leaving Young a widower. Angell and Young were married on March 31, 1834, in Kirtland, Ohio. Angell eventually gave her consent to the practice of plural marriage after Young's marriage to Lucy Ann Decker, his first plural wife. Angell remained married to Young until his death in 1877, and together they had six children.

== Early life and conversion ==
Angell was born in Seneca, New York to James and Phoebe Morton Angell on June 8, 1803. Her parents moved to Providence, Rhode Island when she was young, where Mary Ann later became a Free Will Baptist and worked as a Sunday School teacher. Deeply religious and studious of the Hebrew and Christian scriptures, she vowed never to marry until she met "a man of God" in whom she could confide her spirituality and with whom her heart could unite in the active duties of a Christian life.

Angell first learned of the LDS Church when Thomas B. Marsh traveled to Providence in 1830 to conduct his missionary efforts. She requested a copy of the Book of Mormon from Marsh, which she prayerfully read and studied. Angell developed a testimony of the book and continued to learn more about the growing church. In 1831, Mary Ann, along with her mother Phoebe and brother Truman O. Angell, left Providence and moved to China, New York. While in New York, Truman was baptized into the LDS Church in January 1832; Mary Ann was baptized shortly thereafter by Elder John P. Greene. Mary Ann then set out alone for Kirtland, Ohio, the gathering place of the early members of the church.

== Marriage and family ==
Shortly after her arrival in Kirtland, she met and married Brigham Young. She encountered the widowed Young while he was giving a sermon, and Angell felt "drawn to him" as she listened to him preach. Young was quickly impressed by Angell's spiritual nature and countenance, and the two began their courtship. The couple secured a marriage license in February 1834, and were legally married on March 31, 1834. The two were later sealed in the Nauvoo Temple. Mary Ann Angell and Brigham Young had a total of six children together.

Young departed for a mission to England in 1839, just ten days after Angell had given birth to their daughter Alice. During Young's absence, which lasted over 20 months, Angell and their six children at the time (two of which were from Young's previous marriage to Miriam Works) struggled with poverty, illness, and harsh conditions. Upon Young's return from England, Angell helped nurse him back to health after he became very ill with scarlet fever.

In June 1842 Brigham Young was married to Lucy Ann Decker. It is uncertain when Angell first learned of her husband's entrance into the practice of plural marriage—given that many early plural unions took place without the first wives' consent—but by 1843 she had signaled her acceptance of the doctrine and given her consent to her husband's subsequent marriages. Young was later sealed to Angell's mother Phebe and sister Jemima.

== Legacy ==
Angell was referred to as “Sister Young” or “Mrs. Young” by her husband's other wives, whom she befriended. Young established his permanent residence with Angell in the White House, which was completed in 1854. While Angell never lived in the Lion House or the Beehive House with Young's other wives, she involved herself in the gatherings of the family on various occasions. Some of Young’s plural wives recognized Angell's position of prominence and apparently held her in high esteem. In a poem, Eliza Snow paid homage to Mary Ann as “Mother of mothers! Queen of queens.” Unlike some of Young's other wives, Angell never assumed a position of prominence within the church, other than through her marriage to Young.

Angell died on June 27, 1882, in Salt Lake City, Utah, surviving Young by nearly five years. She suffered from cancer for three years leading up to her death. Angell is buried in the Brigham Young Family Memorial Cemetery near the Mormon Pioneer Memorial Monument in Salt Lake City.

=== Folk remedies ===
Mary Ann was a skilled herbalist and folk doctor. Following Young's return from England in 1841, he became ill with scarlet fever. When Young lost consciousness, Angell used various techniques to revive him, including throwing cold water in his face, rubbing camphor on his eyes and mouth, and a primitive version of mouth-to-mouth resuscitation, which would not be commonly practiced until the mid-20th century.

She brought many seeds with her from Nauvoo and is credited with planting many of the beautiful trees growing along the eastern end of South Temple Street (once known as Brigham Street) in Salt Lake City. James H. Crockwell wrote that she was "gifted and intelligent" but also "humble and meek."

=== Notable descendants ===
Mary Ann's brother, Truman O. Angell, assisted in the construction of the Salt Lake Temple and served for a time as the official architect of the LDS Church.

One of Angell and Young's children was Brigham Young Jr., who was ordained an apostle by his father in 1864 but was not placed in the Quorum of the Twelve Apostles until 1868. John Willard Young, another one of their sons, was also an ordained apostle and was the first counselor in the First Presidency at the end of Brigham Young's administration as church president. Another son was Joseph Angell Young, who was ordained an apostle in 1864 but never became a member of either the Quorum of the Twelve Apostles or the First Presidency. One of the couple's daughters, Eunice "Luna" Caroline Young (Thatcher), married George Washington Thatcher and became the matriarch of the wealthy Thatcher–Young family of Logan, Utah. George Thatcher was a prominent Utah pioneer who had managed a number of Brigham Young's business interests, and was instrumental in developing political, business and church interests in Cache Valley, (Logan, Utah) on behalf of Brigham Young and the LDS church.

== See also ==
- List of Brigham Young's wives
