= 30th Utah Territorial Legislature =

The 30th Utah Territorial Legislature met in 1892. The regular election for the Territorial Council and the House of Representatives was held August 3, 1891.

== Session ==
The legislative session convened on January 11, 1892, at the City Hall in Salt Lake City, and ended on March 12, 1892.

== Territorial Council ==
- President: William H. King
- Democratic Party: 8
- Liberal Party: 4

=== Members ===
Name	Party	District	County
Robert N. Baskin	Liberal	4	Salt Lake
David Evans Jr.	Democratic	2	Weber
James Glendinning	Liberal	4	Salt Lake
Peter Greaves	Democratic	8	Sanpete
Harry Haynes	Liberal	7	Salt Lake
William H. King	Democratic	6	Utah
Robert C. Lund	Democratic	10	Washington
A.J. McCuistion	Democratic	5	Tooele
James A. Melville	Democratic	9	Millard
Patrick J. Moran	Liberal	4	Salt Lake
Joseph Morrell	Democratic	1	Cache
John D. Peters	Democratic	3	Box Elder

== House of Representatives ==
- Speaker: William H. Seegmiller
- Democratic Party: 16
- Liberal Party: 8

=== Members ===
Name	Party	District	County
Charles Adams	Democratic	16	Iron
George R. Allen	Democratic	3	Weber
Minard F. Arnett	Democratic	9	Salt Lake
William F. Colton	Liberal	5	Salt Lake
George Cunningham	Democratic	7	Utah
Edward P. Ferry	Liberal	10	Summit
John D. Irvine	Democratic	12	Utah
William H. Irvine	Liberal	5	Salt Lake
James N. Kimball	Liberal	3	Weber
Henry W. Lawrence	Liberal	5	Salt Lake
John C. Mackay	Democratic	8	Salt Lake
John A. Marshall	Liberal	5	Salt Lake
Nathaniel Montgomery	Democratic	4	Weber
Jacob Moritz	Liberal	5	Salt Lake
Aquila Nebeker	Democratic	1	Rich
Lars M. Olson	Democratic	14	Emery
Frank Pierce	Liberal	5	Salt Lake
Walter R. Pike	Democratic	11	Utah
William P. Sargent	Democratic	17	Garfield
William H. Seegmiller	Democratic	15	Sevier
Alphonso H. Snow	Democratic	2	Box Elder
David Stoker	Democratic	6	Davis
Luther T. Tuttle	Democratic	13	Sanpete
John F. Wright	Democratic	1	Cache

== Detailed election results ==
=== Territorial Council ===
1st Council district
Party	Candidate	Votes	%
Democratic	Joseph Morrell	1,319	66.7
Republican	Willard W. Maughan	634	32.1
Liberal	W.H. Snelling	25	1.3

2nd Council district
Party	Candidate	Votes	%
Democratic	David Evans Jr.	918	39.6
Liberal	Fred J. Kiesel	908	39.2
Republican	Edmund T. Hulaniski	493	21.3

3rd Council district
Party	Candidate	Votes	%
Democratic	John D. Peters	1,029	57.0
Republican	Peter Lowe	634	35.1
Liberal	John W. Guthrie	142	7.9

4th Council district, Position 1
Party	Candidate	Votes	%
Liberal	Robert N. Baskin	3,784	55.6
Democratic	Parley L. Williams	2,659	39.1
Republican	Robert Harkness	364	5.3

4th Council district, Position 2
Party	Candidate	Votes	%
Liberal	James Glendinning	3,780	55.5
Democratic	Wendell Benson	2,660	39.0
Republican	George A. Lowe	372	5.5

4th Council district, Position 3
Party	Candidate	Votes	%
Liberal	Patrick J. Moran	3,781	55.7
Democratic	LeGrand Young	2,661	39.2
Republican	James Sharp	352	5.2

5th Council district
Party	Candidate	Votes	%
Democratic	A.J. McCuistion	1,355	50.2
Republican	Alma T. Hague	695	25.8
Liberal	J.A. Gallagher	648	24.0

6th Council district
Party	Candidate	Votes	%
Democratic	William H. King	1,667	60.1
Republican	John E. Booth	877	31.6
Liberal	J.E. Mathews	231	8.3

7th Council district
Party	Candidate	Votes	%
Liberal	Harry Haynes	1,422	43.4
Republican	Alma Eldredge	1,090	33.2
Democratic	William C.A. Smoot Jr.	768	23.4

8th Council district
Party	Candidate	Votes	%
Democratic	Peter Greaves	1,314	55.5
Republican	Anthon H. Lund	854	36.1
Liberal	S.W. Martin	199	8.4

9th Council district
Party	Candidate	Votes	%
Democratic	James A. Melville	1,273	60.8
Republican	Thomas C. Callister	508	24.3
Republican	Henry G. Mathis	258	12.3
Liberal	H.M. Kenna	55	2.6

10th Council district
Party	Candidate	Votes	%
Democratic	Robert C. Lund	1,274	68.7
Republican	S.R. West	554	29.9
	Charles Adams	10	0.5
	W.F. Jones	10	0.5
	Robert W. Heyborne	2	0.1
	J.W. McCuistion	2	0.1
	L.D. Williams	2	0.1
	Philo T. Farnsworth Jr.	1	0.1

=== House of Representatives ===
1st House district, Position 1
Party	Candidate	Votes	%
Democratic	Aquila Nebeker	1,322	67.7
Republican	Joseph Howell	611	31.3
Liberal	Mark Fletcher	20	1.0

1st House district, Position 2
Party	Candidate	Votes	%
Democratic	John F. Wright	1,332	67.8
Republican	John W. Dykins	614	31.2
Liberal	Joseph Wood	20	1.0

2nd House district
Party	Candidate	Votes	%
Democratic	Alphonso H. Snow	398	56.5
Republican	Oliver G. Snow	216	30.7
Liberal	A.E. Barnes	90	12.8

3rd House district, Position 1
Party	Candidate	Votes	%
Democratic	George R. Allen	944	40.4
Liberal	Don M. Maguire	898	38.4
Republican	Justus Witherell	495	21.2

3rd House district, Position 2
Party	Candidate	Votes	%
Liberal	James N. Kimball	915	39.7
Democratic	Thomas D. Dee	899	39.0
Republican	Isaac L. Clark	493	21.4

4th House district
Party	Candidate	Votes	%
Democratic	Nathaniel Montgomery	627	56.2
Republican	David McKay	440	39.4
Liberal	J. Henry Taylor	47	4.2
	Josiah M. Ferrin	1	0.1
	James N. Kimball	1	0.1

5th House district, Position 1
Party	Candidate	Votes	%
Liberal	Frank Pierce	3,750	55.2
Democratic	George R. Cushing	2,704	39.8
Republican	Daniel Harrington	334	4.9

5th House district, Position 2
Party	Candidate	Votes	%
Liberal	Henry W. Lawrence	3,776	55.2
Democratic	R. C. Chambers	2,683	39.2
Republican	Edward B. Critchlow	378	5.5

5th House district, Position 3
Party	Candidate	Votes	%
Liberal	Jacob Moritz	3,675	54.9
Democratic	Franklin S. Richards	2,656	39.7
Republican	Louis Cohn	367	5.5

5th House district, Position 4
Party	Candidate	Votes	%
Liberal	William H. Irvine	3,779	55.3
Democratic	Joseph L. Rawlins	2,683	39.3
Republican	James Devine	372	5.4

5th House district, Position 5
Party	Candidate	Votes	%
Liberal	William F. Colton	3,774	55.4
Democratic	William Burke	2,685	39.4
Republican	August W. Carlson	349	5.1

5th House district, Position 6
Party	Candidate	Votes	%
Liberal	John A. Marshall	3,794	55.8
Democratic	Elias A. Smith	2,652	39.0
Republican	Nicholas Treweek	355	5.2

6th House district
Party	Candidate	Votes	%
Democratic	David Stoker	802	73.5
Republican	Joseph R. Porter	219	20.1
Liberal	Lars P. Edholm	70	6.4

7th House district
Party	Candidate	Votes	%
Democratic	George Cunningham	856	63.6
Republican	Edward W. Robinson	433	32.2
Liberal	Antoine Christensen	57	4.2

8th House district
Party	Candidate	Votes	%
Democratic	John C. Mackay	787	54.2
Liberal	Thomas M. James	441	30.4
Republican	George M. Cannon	223	15.4

9th House district
Party	Candidate	Votes	%
Democratic	Minard F. Arnett	639	42.2
Liberal	R.G. Legg	521	34.4
Republican	George F. Richards	355	23.4

10th House district
Party	Candidate	Votes	%
Liberal	Edward P. Ferry	970	53.4
Democratic	John Boyden	634	34.9
Republican	Archibald Buchanan	214	11.8

11th House district
Party	Candidate	Votes	%
Democratic	Walter R. Pike	807	73.5
Republican	George Sutherland	433	20.1
Liberal	J.E. Hills	167	6.4

12th House district
Party	Candidate	Votes	%
Democratic	John D. Irvine	745	61.6
Republican	Jonathan S. Page Jr.	407	33.6
Liberal	John Marwick	58	4.8

13th House district
Party	Candidate	Votes	%
Democratic	Luther T. Tuttle	635	53.8
Republican	Louis Anderson	406	34.4
Liberal	Jacob Johnson	140	11.9

14th House district
Party	Candidate	Votes	%
Democratic	Lars M. Olson	532	54.4
Republican	Abram C. Hatch	404	41.3
Liberal	O.G. Kimball	42	4.3

15th House district
Party	Candidate	Votes	%
Democratic	William H. Seegmiller	602	53.0
Republican	William H. Clark	477	42.0
Liberal	J.W. Phillips	56	4.9

16th House district
Party	Candidate	Votes	%
Democratic	Charles Adams	701	75.6
Republican	Philo T. Farnsworth Jr.	212	22.9
Liberal	J.D. Williams	14	1.5

17th House district
Party	Candidate	Votes	%
Democratic	William P. Sargent	463	51.3
Republican	John Rider	243	26.9
Liberal	John F. Chidester	178	19.7
	S.W. West	18	2.0
