= 27th Utah Territorial Legislature =

Legislative session of the Utah Territory

The 27th Utah Territorial Legislature met in 1886. The regular election for the Territorial Council and the House of Representatives was held August 3, 1885.

== Session ==
The legislative session convened on January 11, 1886, at the City Hall in Salt Lake City, and ended on March 12, 1886.

== Members ==
Name	County	Office	Notes
Territorial Council:
Joseph Barton	Davis		
Samuel Francis	Morgan		
Joel Grover	Juab		
James T. Hammond	Cache		
Robert W. Heyborne	Iron		
Jonathan S. Page	Utah		
James Sharp	Salt Lake		
Lewis W. Shurtliff	Weber		
Martin Slack	Washington		
Elias A. Smith	Salt Lake	President	
John W. Taylor	Salt Lake		
Luther T. Tuttle	Sanpete		
Territorial House of Representatives:
Charles L. Anderson	Tooele		
Richard H. Baty	Box Elder		
John Q. Cannon	Salt Lake		
John Clark	Salt Lake		
William Creer	Utah		
Philo T. Farnsworth Jr.	Beaver		
Abram C. Hatch	Wasatch		
John Houston	Garfield		
Joseph Howell	Cache		
Joseph Kimball	Rich		
William H. King	Millard		
Anthon H. Lund	Sanpete		
Thomas J. McCullough	Utah		
David C. McLaughlin	Summit		
John Rider	Kane		
William W. Riter	Salt Lake	Speaker	
William C.A. Smoot Jr.	Utah		
James R. Stewart	Morgan		
Edwin Stratford	Weber		
Albert D. Thurber	Sevier		
Samuel R. Thurman	Utah		
Joseph A. West	Weber		
Orson A. Woolley	Salt Lake		
Don Carlos Young	Salt Lake		

The House seat for Summit County faced a similar dispute to the House seat for Tooele in the Legislative Assembly of 1876. The Liberal Party ticket secured a rare victory over the dominant People's Party of the Mormon establishment, leading to the election of David C. McLaughlin to the House. Losing candidate Ward E. Pack, who had previously represented Summit in the legislatures of 1876 and 1880, sought to contest the result, alleging illegal votes in the Park City precincts from which McLaughlin hailed. However, with the election overseen by the federal government's Utah Commission under the Edmunds Act, claims of fraud were rejected and the Liberal victory upheld.
