= Belle London =

American brothel madam

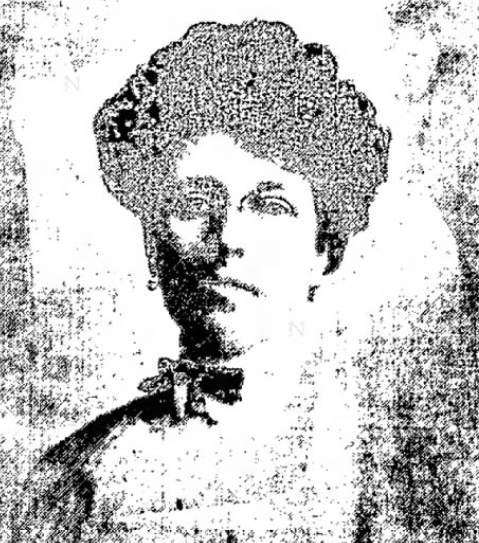
- London in 1909
- Born: Dora B. Hughes; December 1866; Illinois
- Died: 1924 (aged 57–58); San Francisco, California
- Other names: Dora B. Topham, Maxine Rose
- Occupation: Brothel owner
- Spouse: Thomas Topham (m. 1890; div. 1902)

Belle London (a.k.a. Dora B. Topham {née Hughes}; December 1866 – 1924) was a madam who operated brothels in Ogden, Utah from 1889. She built the parlor house "No. 10 Electric Alley," a complex of small cubicles for prostitutes, close to Union Station on 25th Street. London used the upper level of the London Ice Cream Parlor as a cover for one of her brothels.

London married Thomas Topham, a master boilermaker for Union Pacific in 1890. Topham would become a saloon keeper, and together with London, they would gain much influence in Ogden. London also had an adopted daughter named Ethel Topham. London sued for divorce in 1902.

In 1908, London was hired by Salt Lake City Mayor John S. Bransford to oversee the move of illicit activities of the downtown red-light district to a new purpose-built stockade outside of the city center. The plan eventually failed and the stockade was closed in 1911.

Police raids on 25th Street in 1912 set out to eliminate prostitution, and Belle London left Ogden in around 1914. She moved to San Francisco and changed her name to Maxine Rose. She continued working in the sex business and purchased a hotel.

London died in 1924 in San Francisco following injuries she sustained when she was crushed while attempting to untie a rope she was using to tow an automobile.

== In popular culture ==
- In Alison L. McLennan's second historical novel, Ophelia's War: Dangerous Mercy, Belle London is a character based on herself.
