= Bransford (surname) =

Bransford is a surname. Notable people with the surname include:

- John D. Bransford (1943–2022), American psychologist
- John M. Bransford (1901–1967), American politician
- John S. Bransford (1856–1944), American politician
- Wulstan Bransford, 14th century Roman Catholic bishop
