= John Sharp (Mormon) =

Leader of the LDS Church in Utah Territory (1820–1891)

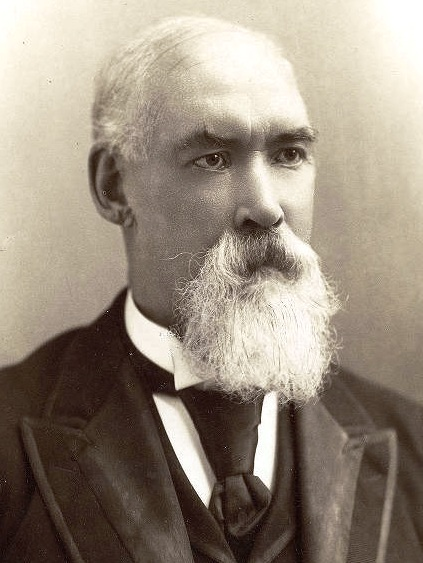

Personal details
- Born: 9 November 1820; Clackmannan, Scotland
- Died: 23 December 1891 (aged 71); Salt Lake City, Utah, United States
- Cause of death: Intestinal cancer
- Signature

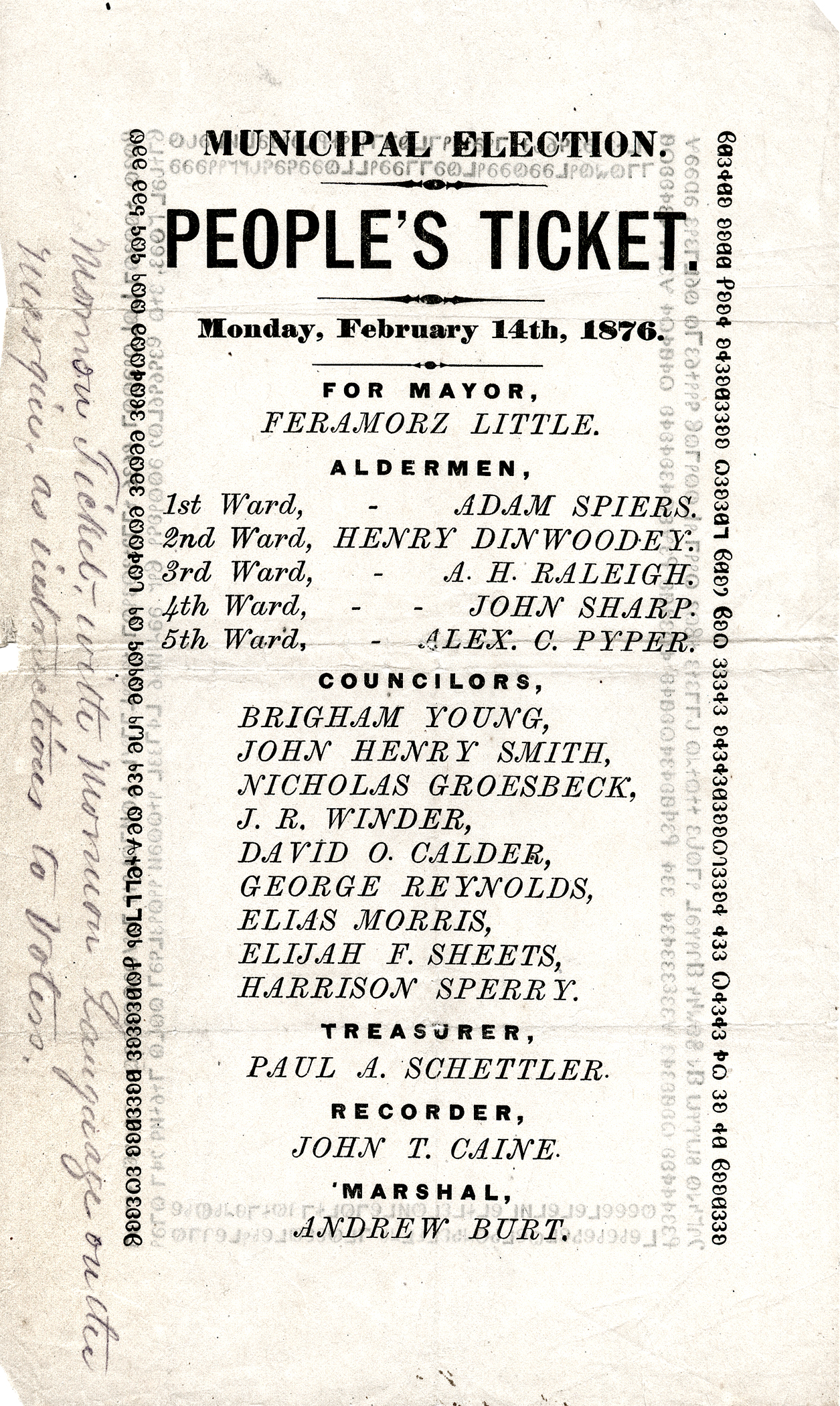
People's Party of Utah flyer for the 1876 Salt Lake City municipal election

John Sharp (9 November 1820 – 23 December 1891) was a 19th-century leader in the Church of Jesus Christ of Latter-day Saints (LDS Church) in Utah Territory. Sharp was the LDS Church's representative in negotiations regarding the construction of the First transcontinental railroad through Utah Territory. He represented the LDS Church and its president, Brigham Young, at the driving of the final golden spike of the railroad on 10 May 1869 at Promontory Summit, Utah Territory.

== Early life ==
Sharp was born in Clackmannan, Scotland. He began working in a coal mine at age eight. Sharp converted to Mormonism in 1847 and in 1850 he immigrated to Utah Territory. Sharp was the head of a company of Mormon pioneers, and after arriving in the Salt Lake Valley on 28 August 1850, he settled in Salt Lake City. He became involved in the hauling of rocks in the construction of the Salt Lake Temple. In 1856, Sharp became the first bishop of the Salt Lake Twentieth Ward. When he became a bishop, Sharp was also made a member of the LDS Church's Council of Fifty, and an assistant trustee-in-trust of the church.

== Career ==
Brigham Young appointed Sharp as his personal representative and as a representative of the LDS Church in transcontinental railroad construction negotiations with the Union Pacific Railroad. After the railroad was completed in 1869, Sharp became an officer for the Utah Central Railroad and the Utah Southern Railroad. He also became a director for the Union Pacific Railroad, Zion's Cooperative Mercantile Institution, Deseret Telegraph Company, and Deseret National Bank.

Sharp was also involved in politics and was a city councilor in Salt Lake City and was the territorial chairman of the People's Party, a party backed by the LDS Church to counter the non-Mormon Liberal Party.

== Legal issues ==
Sharp practiced plural marriage; in 1885, he was prosecuted for unlawful cohabitation under the Edmunds Act. Sharp initially pleaded not guilty, but withdrew his plea and pleaded guilty to the charge. He was fined $300 and court costs. As a result of pleading guilty, rather than plead not guilty as other LDS Church leaders had done, Sharp was asked by the stake high council and the First Presidency to resign as bishop of the Salt Lake Twentieth Ward, which he did on 3 November 1885. The New York Times criticized the church's removal of Sharp and suggested that it "reveals again the stubborn character of the Mormons' opposition to the law".

== Death ==
Sharp died in Salt Lake City of intestinal cancer. His son James Sharp was the mayor of Salt Lake City and succeeded in his position as director of Union Pacific Railroad. Sharp is also the great-great-grandfather of writer Anne Fadiman.
