= John Bransford =

John Bransford may refer to:

- John D. Bransford (1943–2022), American psychologist and educationist
- John M. Bransford (1901–1967), member of the Arkansas House of Representatives, 1931–1935 and 1937–1941
- John S. Bransford (1856–1944), mayor of Salt Lake City, Utah, 1907–11
