= Spencer Clawson =

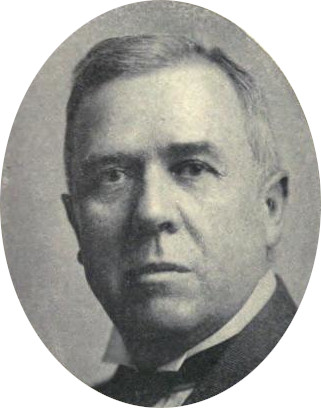
- Born: August 15, 1852; Salt Lake City, Utah
- Died: October 2, 1916 (aged 64); Salt Lake City, Utah
- Known for: Businessman and civic leader

Orson Spencer Clawson (August 15, 1852 – October 2, 1916) generally known simply as Spencer Clawson, was a politician, businessman and inventor in Salt Lake City, Utah.

Clawson was the son of Hiram B. Clawson and his wife Ellen Spencer Clawson. Ellen was the daughter of Orson Spencer for whom Spencer Clawson was named. Spencer Clawson was baptized a Latter-day Saint in 1860 at the age of eight.

Clawson was a half-brother of Rudger Clawson who worked for a time under Clawson in the dry goods trade.

In 1900 Clawson received a patent for a method of typing both a letter's address and the letter itself on the same sheet of paper. In 1890 Clawson was the candidate of the People's Party for mayor of Salt Lake City but he lost to George M. Scott the candidate of the Liberal Party.

Clawson married Nabbie Howe Young a daughter of Brigham Young and Clarissa Clara Decker. Spencer and Nabbie had six children.

Clawson was involved in the dry goods trade in Salt Lake City, buying most of his products from New York City where he was well known among wholesalers.

Spencer Clawson was also on the original committee that worked to form Latter-day Saint College in 1886. This institution has gone through many changes in name and function but is the ancestor of the current LDS Business College.

Clawson was also the president of the Pioneer Jubilee celebration in 1897.

Clawson's son Orson Spencer Clawson Jr. was a great musician and pianist. Another son, Curtis Young Clawson, was a major in the United States Army artillery in World War I.

== Sources ==
- Deseret News, Sep. 29, 1900.
- Andrew Jenson. LDS Biographical Encyclopedia, Vol. 4, p. 289; Vol. 2, p. 615.
- B. H. Roberts, Comprehensive History of the Church, Vol. 6, p. 206
- Utah Genealogical Magazine article on Brigham Young's descendants
