= W. Mont Ferry =

American politician

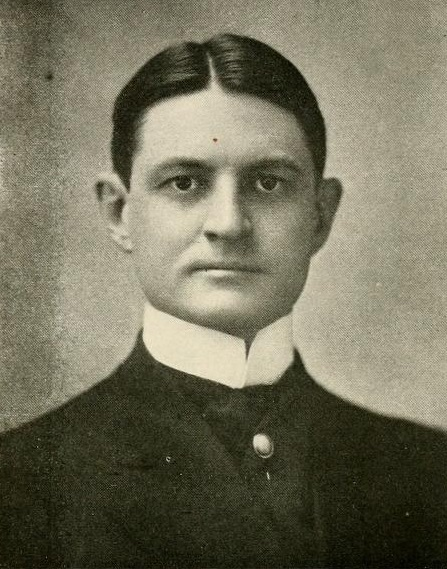
- From 1914's Men of Affairs in the State of Utah

17th Mayor of Salt Lake City
- Preceded by: Samuel C. Park
- Succeeded by: Edmund A. Bock

Personal details
- Born: March 12, 1871 Grand Haven, Michigan, U.S.
- Died: January 11, 1938 (aged 66) Salt Lake City, Utah, U.S.
- Resting place: Lake Forest Cemetery, Grand Haven, Michigan
- Party: American Party before 1911; Republican after 1911
- Relations: Ferry family

William Montague Ferry (March 12, 1871 – January 11, 1938) was an American politician. He was a Utah State Senator and the 17th mayor of Salt Lake City.

Ferry was born in Grand Haven, Michigan, and was the son of Edward P. Ferry and Clara White. Ferry was named after his grandfather, who was a Presbyterian minister and missionary in Michigan.

Ferry moved to Utah and became a mining investor in Utah and Nevada. He was president of the American Silver Producers. He was an associate of United States Senator Thomas Kearns.

Ferry served as director and vice-president of the Utah Savings & Trust Co, the director of the Walker Brothers Bank, the Silver King Coalition Mines, and the Mason Valley Mines of Nevada.

In January 1903, Thompson was a signatory of an official protest to the United States Senate of the Utah Legislature's election of Mormon apostle Reed Smoot as a United States Senator for Utah. In 1904, when Kearns failed to be re-elected to the Senate by the Utah Legislature due to the perceived influence of Smoot, Ferry was among the founders of the anti-Mormon American Party. In the 1904 election, Ferry was elected as a member of the city council of Salt Lake City. The mayor, Ezra Thompson, and three other members of the city council were also members of the American Party.

In 1911, the American Party dissolved, and Ferry was elected as a Republican to the Utah State Senate. He served in the State Senate until 1915, when he was elected mayor of Salt Lake City. He served as mayor for one term, until 1919.

Ferry married Edna Tremain in 1896. Ednah Ferry was a delegate from Utah to the 1924 Republican National Convention.

He died in Salt Lake City on January 11, 1938, and was buried at Lake Forest Cemetery in Grand Haven. His wife Ednah was left in charge of his estate worth $345,000 ($6,550,000 in 2021 dollars).

Political offices
Preceded by Samuel C. Park	Mayor of Salt Lake City; 1916–1919	Succeeded by Edmund A. Bock
