= John A. Marshall =

John A. Marshall may refer to:

- John Augustine Marshall (1854–1941), United States Federal Judge
- John Aloysius Marshall (1928–1994), American prelate of the Roman Catholic Church
