= Smithton, Illinois =

Smithton
- Village
- Location of Smithton in St. Clair County, Illinois.
- Coordinates: 38°23′31″N 89°59′54″W
- Country: United States
- State: Illinois
- County: St. Clair

Area
  - Total: 4.49 sq mi (11.62 km^{2})
  - Land: 4.44 sq mi (11.49 km^{2})
  - Water: 0.054 sq mi (0.14 km^{2})
- Elevation: 472 ft (144 m)

Population (2020)
  - Total: 4,006
  - Density: 903.4/sq mi (348.79/km^{2})
- Time zone: UTC-6 (CST)
  - Summer (DST): UTC-5 (CDT)
- ZIP code: 62285
- Area code: 618
- FIPS code: 17-70252
- GNIS feature ID: 2399833
- Website: smithton-village.com

Smithton is a village in St. Clair County, Illinois, United States. The population was 4,006 in the 2020 United States census. It is part of the Metro East region of Greater Saint Louis.

== Geography ==
The village has a total area of 3.86 square miles (10.0 km^{2}), of which 3.82 square miles (9.9 km^{2}) (or 98.96%) is land and 0.04 square miles (0.10 km^{2}) (or 1.04%) is water., according to the 2010 census.

== Demographics ==
Historical population
Census	Pop.	Note	%±
1880	400		—
1890	411		2.8%
1900	405		−1.5%
1910	380		−6.2%
1920	357		−6.1%
1930	361		1.1%
1940	448		24.1%
1950	515		15.0%
1960	629		22.1%
1970	847		34.7%
1980	1,447		70.8%
1990	1,587		9.7%
2000	2,248		41.7%
2010	3,693		64.3%
2020	4,006		8.5%
U.S. Decennial Census

=== 2020 census ===
As of the 2020 census, Smithton had a population of 4,006. The median age was 40.7 years. 25.5% of residents were under the age of 18 and 16.9% of residents were 65 years of age or older. For every 100 females there were 95.7 males, and for every 100 females age 18 and over there were 93.6 males age 18 and over.

0.0% of residents lived in urban areas, while 100.0% lived in rural areas.

There were 1,526 households in Smithton, of which 37.5% had children under the age of 18 living in them. Of all households, 63.3% were married-couple households, 12.3% were households with a male householder and no spouse or partner present, and 19.3% were households with a female householder and no spouse or partner present. About 20.0% of all households were made up of individuals and 11.0% had someone living alone who was 65 years of age or older.

There were 1,579 housing units, of which 3.4% were vacant. The homeowner vacancy rate was 0.7% and the rental vacancy rate was 11.3%.

Racial composition as of the 2020 census
Race	Number	Percent
White	3,759	93.8%
Black or African American	36	0.9%
American Indian and Alaska Native	8	0.2%
Asian	21	0.5%
Native Hawaiian and Other Pacific Islander	1	0.0%
Some other race	14	0.3%
Two or more races	167	4.2%
Hispanic or Latino (of any race)	65	1.6%

=== 2000 census ===
As of the census of 2000, there were 2,248 people, 786 households, and 605 families residing in the village. The population density was 1,344.5 inhabitants per square mile (519.1/km^{2}). There were 807 housing units at an average density of 482.6 per square mile (186.3/km^{2}). The racial makeup of the village was 97.46% White, 0.76% African American, 0.36% Native American, 0.40% Asian, 0.04% Pacific Islander, and 0.98% from two or more races. Hispanic or Latino of any race were 0.22% of the population.

There were 786 households, out of which 41.0% had children under the age of 18 living with them, 64.0% were married couples living together, 8.9% had a female householder with no husband present, and 23.0% were non-families. 19.5% of all households were made up of individuals, and 8.4% had someone living alone who was 65 years of age or older. The average household size was 2.74 and the average family size was 3.16.

In the village, the population was spread out, with 27.1% under the age of 18, 7.6% from 18 to 24, 31.8% from 25 to 44, 21.1% from 45 to 64, and 12.4% who were 65 years of age or older. The median age was 35 years. For every 100 females, there were 95.1 males. For every 100 females age 18 and over, there were 91.8 males.

The median income for a household in the village was $51,806, and the median income for a family was $59,875. Males had a median income of $40,588 versus $31,932 for females. The per capita income for the village was $19,695. About 7.0% of families and 9.3% of the population were below the poverty line, including 9.5% of those under age 18 and 11.3% of those age 65 or over.

== Public library ==
The Smithton Public Library District is located in Smithton, IL, though the District encompasses an area greater than the village itself. The District was established in 1988 and opened its library building in July 1993.

The Smithton Public Library District is a member of the Lewis and Clark Library System, allowing patrons to borrow books directly from dozens of member libraries.

The library is supported primarily though public funds through library taxes levied by its board of trustees, but also through private donations, book sales, and fees for services such as printing and faxing.

The district boasts a collection of more than 17,000 items, including books, magazines, audiobooks, music CDs, movies, and eBook readers. In February 2011, the district became the first library in the region to offer eBook readers to patrons for check-out.

== Notable person ==
- Edmund A. Bock (1888-1923), 18th mayor of Salt Lake City
