= James Glendinning =

James Glendinning may refer to:

- James Glendinning (American politician) (1844–1902)
- James Glendinning (Canadian politician) (1849–1929)
- Robert James Glendinning (born 1938), Northern Irish playwright and politician
