= Charles Clarence Neslen =

American politician

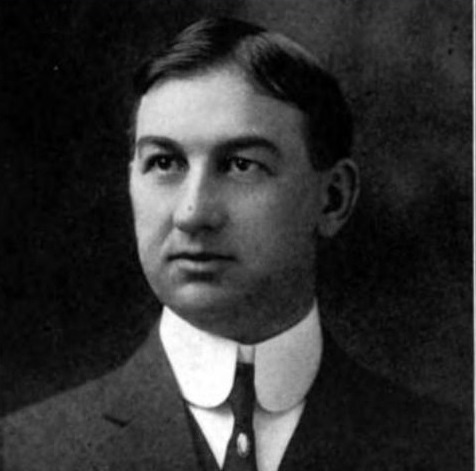
From Volume 2 (1919) of Utah Since Statehood: Historical and Biographical

Charles Clarence Neslen (April 17, 1879 – December 7, 1967) was the 19th mayor of Salt Lake City, Utah from 1920 to 1928.

From 1913 to 1938, Neslen was also the bishop of the 20th Ward of the Church of Jesus Christ of Latter-day Saints (LDS Church), which was located in the Avenues area of Salt Lake City.

Neslen was raised in Salt Lake City. From 1902 to 1904 he was a Mormon missionary in Germany. During his mission, most Mormon missionaries were banished from Germany and he was imprisoned in Danzig. He served as president of the Königsberg District of the LDS Church for a part of his mission.

Neslen was a member of the Democratic Party and a delegate to the Democratic National Convention in 1912.

Neslen worked a total of 15 years for the Deseret News. He was also a realtor and for a time served as secretary of the Salt Lake Real Estate Association.

On October 26, 1905, Neslen married Grace T. Cannon, a daughter of George Q. Cannon. They had five children. Following the death of Grace on June 20, 1950, Nelsen married Julia Paxman Sloan.

Neslen's half-sister, Florence Neslen, was the mother of Richard L. Evans, an apostle in the LDS Church.

== Notes ==
Political offices
Preceded by Edmund A. Bock	Mayor of Salt Lake City; 1920–1928	Succeeded by John F. Bowman
