= American Party (1904) =

Political party in Utah, US (1905–1911)

- Founded: 1904
- Dissolved: 1911
- Split from: Republican Party
- Preceded by: Liberal Party (not legal predecessor)
- Newspaper: The Salt Lake Tribune (de facto)
- Ideology: American nationalism Liberalism; Secularism; Anti-clericalism; Republicanism
- Political position: Centre

The American Party was a political party in Utah from 1904 to 1911. It opposed the influence of the Church of Jesus Christ of Latter-day Saints (LDS Church) hierarchy in Utah politics and is often described as an anti-Mormon party.

== Creation ==
The American Party was founded in 1904 by supporters of Thomas Kearns. Kearns was a U.S. Senator from Utah, mining and railroad magnate, banker and newspaper owner, including the owner of the Salt Lake Tribune; under his ownership, the Tribune became a harsh critic of the LDS Church. In 1904, Utah's junior senator, LDS Church Apostle Reed Smoot, convinced the state legislature to elect George Sutherland to replace Kearns. Kearns was outraged and was convinced that Smoot had orchestrated his removal because of the Tribune's opposition to the LDS Church. Kearns's supporters formed the American Party, which was an attempt to revive Utah's 19th-century anti-Mormon Liberal Party. Though not publicly among the party's organizers, Kearns was influential in the party. As an editor for the Salt Lake Tribune, former United States Senator Frank J. Cannon also played an important promotional role for the party.

== Activities ==
The party attracted a variety of non-Mormon, lapsed Mormon, and ex-Republican politicians and was endorsed by the Salt Lake Tribune. Between 1905 and 1911, the party controlled the municipal governments of Ogden and Salt Lake City. In 1905, party co-founder Ezra Thompson was elected mayor of Salt Lake City, with fellow party members W. Mont Ferry, Arthur J. Davis, Lewis D. Martin, and Martin E. Mulvey elected as city councilors. (Thompson had previously served as a Republican mayor of Salt Lake City from 1900 to 1903.) Thompson resigned in 1907 and he was replaced by new party leader John S. Bransford, who was re-elected in 1907 and was mayor until 1911.

In 1908, the American Party ran John A. Street for governor of Utah. Central platforms of the party were that the leaders of the LDS Church were still participating in plural marriage and had no intention of abiding by the 1890 Manifesto. The party also alleged that the LDS Church monopolized lines of business within Utah and that the state needed a more vigorous enforcement of the separation between church and state.

In 1909, the party opposed a state bill that would have instituted Prohibition in Utah. The LDS Church did not formally support the prohibition bill, but many of its top leaders did.

== Disbanding ==
The party, although reasonably successful for ten years, was disbanded after the 1911 elections in which the party performed disappointingly.

== Electoral history ==
=== Federal Elections ===
U.S. Representative
Year	Nominee	# votes	% votes	Place
1904	Ogden Hiles	6,796	6.68 / 100	3rd
1906	Thomas Weir	11,411	13.58 / 100	3rd
1908	Charles I. Douglas	13,484	12.10 / 100	3rd
1910	Allen T. Sanford	14,042	13.73 / 100	3rd

=== State Elections ===
Governor					Secretary of Stae				
Year	Nominee	# votes	% votes	Place	Year	Nominee	# votes	% votes	Place
1904	W. Montague Ferry	7,959	7.82 / 100	3rd	1904	Walter James	7,801	7.69 / 100	3rd
1908	John A. Street	11,472	10.26 / 100	3rd	1904	E.A. Littlefield	13,960	12.48 / 100	3rd
Attorney General					State Auditor				
Year	Nominee	# votes	% votes	Place	Year	Nominee	# votes	% votes	Place
1904	Samuel McDowall	7,336	7.22 / 100	3rd	1904	Lewis B. Rogers	7,656	7.55 / 100	3rd
1908	J. Walcott Thompson	13,784	12.32 / 100	3rd	1908	George W. Parks	14,071	12.58 / 100	3rd
Treasurer					Superintendent of Public Instruction				
Year	Nominee	# votes	% votes	Place	Year	Nominee	# votes	% votes	Place
1904	W.M. Armstrong	7,880	7.76 / 100	3rd	1904	F.R. Christensen	7,529	7.41 / 100	3rd
1908	Henry Welsh	14,112	12.63 / 100	3rd	1908	George B. Sweazey	14,900	13.25 / 100	3rd

Utah Senate							Utah House of Representatives						
Election	Leader	Votes		Seats		Control	Election	Leader	Votes		Seats		Control
Election	Leader	No.	Share	No.	±	Control	Election	Leader	No.	Share	No.	±	Control
1904	N/A	6,480	9.60% (Note: Of 67,472 votes)	0 / 29	Steady	Republican	1904	N/A	6,573	6.45% (Note: Of 101,905 votes)	0 / 75	Steady	Republican
1904	Candidate Performance: 6th District ▌Geo. L. Nye - 6,480 votes - (19.91%); ▌G. Jay Gibson - 6,410 votes - (19.70%); ▌H.D. Niles - 6,359 votes - (19.54%)			0 / 29	Steady	Republican	1904	Candidate Performance: Salt Lake ▌N.D. Corser - 6,573 votes - (20.22%); ▌John J. Stewart - 6,557 votes - (20.17%); ▌F.M. Benedict - 6,553 votes - (20.16%); ▌J.E. Darmer - 6,535 votes - (20.10%); ▌W.J. Barrette - 6,526 votes - (20.07%); ▌A.V. Taylor - 6,523 votes - (20.06%); ▌J.W. Cahoon - 6,468 votes - (19.89%); ▌K.H.P. Nordberg - 6,456 votes - (19.86%); ▌R.G. Sleater - 6,445 votes - (19.82%); ▌L.N. Lightfoot - 6,444 votes - (19.82%)			0 / 75	Steady	Republican
1906	N/A	10,458	16.22% (Note: Of 64,482 votes)	0 / 29	Steady	Republican	1906	N/A	10,450	12.50% (Note: Of 83,606 votes)	0 / 75	Steady	Republican
1906	Candidate Performance: 6th District ▌Allen T. Sanford - 10,458 votes - (34.97%); ▌James W. Cahoon - 10,408 votes - (34.80%)			0 / 29	Steady	Republican	1906	Candidate Performance: Salt Lake ▌M.H. Wilson - 10,450 votes - (34.50%); ▌George M. Sullivan - 10,436 votes - (34.94%); ▌Thomas Watkins - 10,436 votes - (34.94%); ▌Arthur A. Sweet - 10,432 votes - (34.93%); ▌Douglas Rodeback - 10,419 votes - (34.88%); ▌J.N. Spalding - 10,417 votes - (34.88%); ▌Tony Jacobson - 10,416 votes - (34.87%); ▌B.B. Heywood - 10,411 - (34.86%); ▌R.G. Sleater - 10,377 votes - (34.74%); ▌A.J. Charon - 10,344 votes - (34.63%)			0 / 75	Steady	Republican
1908	N/A	14,112	18.80% (Note: Of 75,060 votes)	0 / 29	Steady	Republican	1908	N/A	13,805	12.37% (Note: Of 111,570 votes)	0 / 75	Steady	Republican
1908	Candidate Performance: 4th District ▌J.H. Knaus - 257 votes - (6.06%); 5th District ▌W.D. Sutton - 284 votes - (5.33%); 6th District ▌George J. Gibson - 13,198 votes - (33.62%); ▌Ed. B. Critchlow - 13,171 votes - (33.55%); ▌Wm. W. Armstrong - 13,132 votes - (33.45%)			0 / 29	Steady	Republican	1908	Candidate Performance: Salt Lake ▌Albert S. Martin - 13,249 votes - (33.73%); ▌Henry Catrow - 13,207 votes - (33.62%); ▌Harlen S. McCann - 13,200 votes - (33.60%); ▌J.N. Spalding - 13,198 votes - (33.60%); ▌James McKinney - 13,192 votes - (33.58%); ▌Eugene W. Kelly - 13,191 votes - (33.58%); ▌Arthur A. Sweet - 13,189 votes - (33.57%); ▌Walter W. Little - 13,185 votes - (33.56%); ▌Norman D. Corser - 13,160 votes - (33.50%); ▌Clifford J. Crabtree - 13,155 votes - (33.49%); Summit ▌David Baxter - 262 votes - (8.27%); Weber ▌Albert F. Richey - 294 votes - (2.81%); ▌B.G. Knoth - 289 votes - (2.76%); ▌W.W. Davis - 275 votes - (2.63%); ▌F.A. Shiells - 265 votes - (2.53%)			0 / 75	Steady	Republican

1.As some Electoral Districts elected multiple candidates, and the total number of ballots cast within the District was not recorded within presently used sources, the vote displayed here is inferred.

=== Municipal Elections ===
Mayoralties
Year	Municipality	Nominee	# votes	% votes	Place
1905	Salt Lake City, UT	Ezra Thompson	8,733	40.42 / 100	Elected
1907	Salt Lake City, UT	John S. Bransford	11,774	48.45 / 100	Re-elected
1909	Salt Lake City, UT	John S. Bransford	13,773	51.76 / 100	Re-elected
1911	Salt Lake City, UT	John S. Bransford	10,915	42.02 / 100	2nd

== See also ==
- Anti-Mormon Party (Illinois)
