= George Montgomery Scott =

American politician

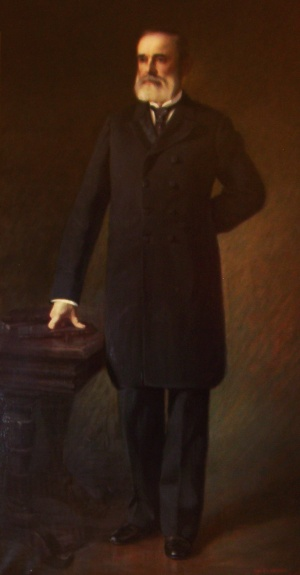
Painting of George Montgomery Scott from the Salt Lake City and County Building

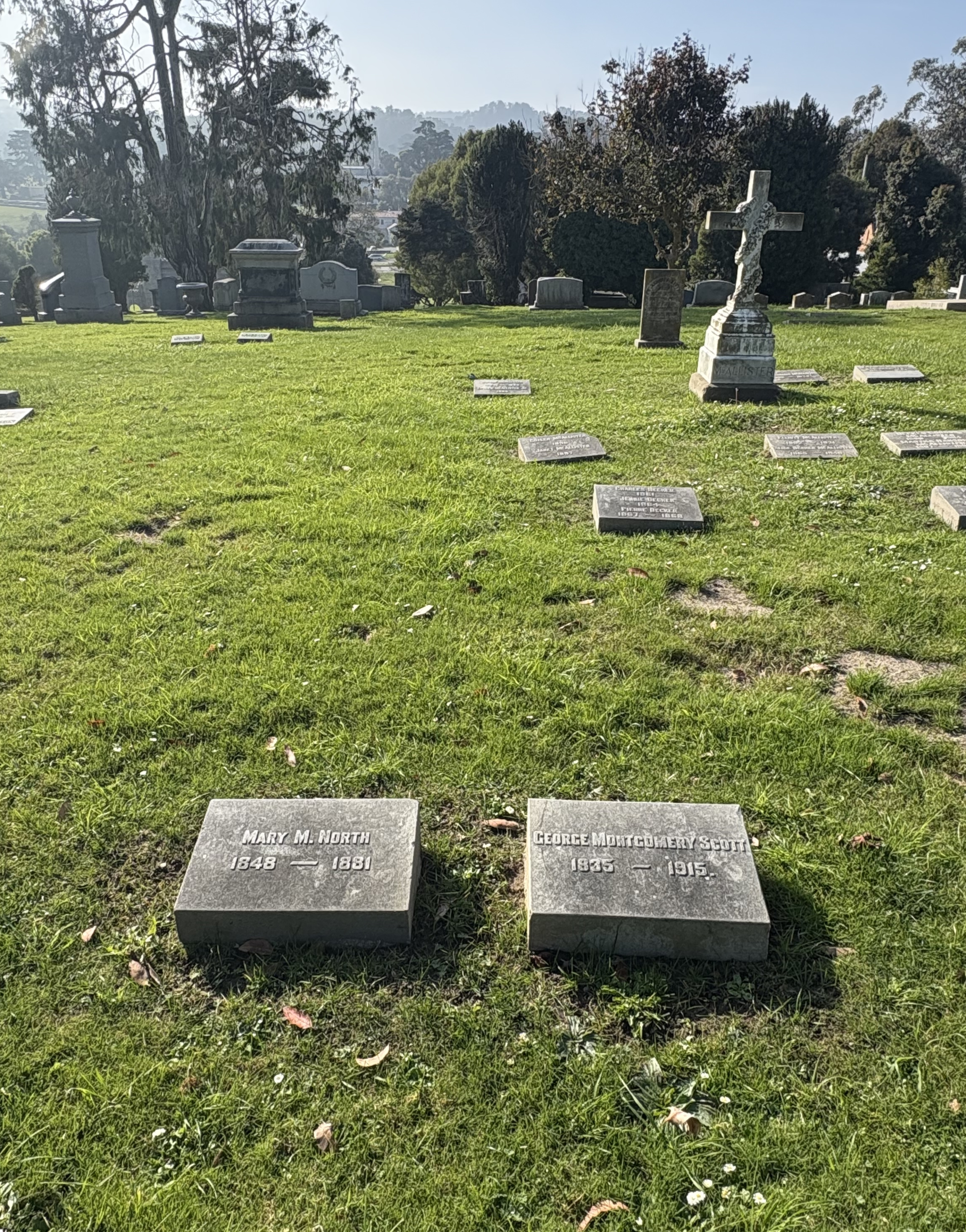
Scott's grave at Cypress Lawn Memorial Park

George Montgomery Scott (July 27, 1835 – November 19, 1915) was a U.S. politician and entrepreneur, notable for being the first non-Mormon mayor of Salt Lake City, Utah. He was a member of the Liberal Party and served as mayor of Salt Lake City from 1890 to 1892.

Scott was not a native of Utah, but was born in Chazy, New York to a merchant father. He followed his father's footsteps, and eventually found his way to California during the gold rush, opening a hardware store in San Francisco. In 1871 he was drawn to Utah for similar reasons, with the opening of mines along the Wasatch Range. He soon opened George M. Scott Hardware Company in Salt Lake City. The company grew and changed, the most impressive evidence of its prosperity was the Scott Building built in downtown on Main Street in 1888.

In the 1890 election Scott defeated Spencer Clawson to be elected mayor of Salt Lake City.

He died in San Mateo, California on November 19, 1915, and was buried at Cypress Lawn Memorial Park in Colma.

Political offices
Preceded by Francis Armstrong	Mayor of Salt Lake City; 1890–1892	Succeeded by Robert N. Baskin
