= Edmund A. Bock =

American politician

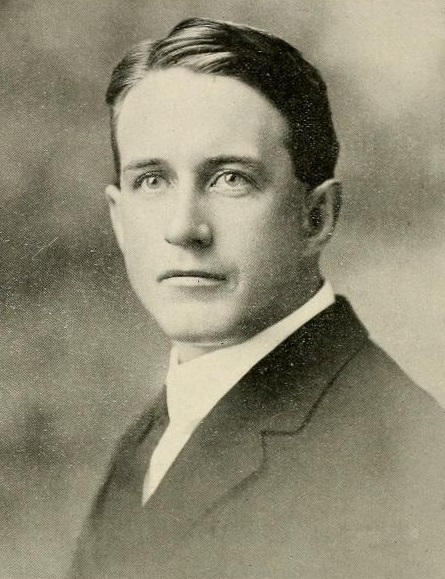
- From 1914's Men of Affairs In the State of Utah

18th Mayor of Salt Lake City
- In office 1920 – July 22, 1920
- Preceded by: W. Mont Ferry
- Succeeded by: Charles Clarence Neslen

Personal details
- Born: September 1, 1888 Smithton, Illinois, U.S.
- Died: October 14, 1923 (aged 35) Stockton, Utah, U.S.
- Party: Independent

Edmund A. Bock (September 1, 1888 – October 14, 1923) was an American politician who served as the 18th mayor of Salt Lake City in 1920.
