= John F. Bowman =

American politician (1880–1960)

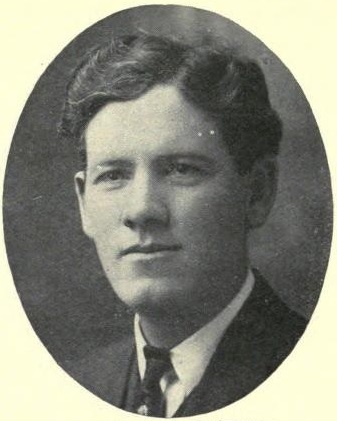
- From 1913's Pioneers and Prominent Men of Utah

20th Mayor of Salt Lake City
- In office 1928–1931
- Preceded by: Charles Clarence Neslen
- Succeeded by: Louis Marcus

Personal details
- Born: May 27, 1880 Weber County, Utah, U.S.
- Died: August 31, 1960 (aged 80) Salt Lake City, Utah, U.S.
- Party: Republican

John F. Bowman (May 27, 1880 – August 31, 1960) was an American attorney and politician who served as the 20th mayor of Salt Lake City from 1928 to 1931. During his tenure as mayor, Bowman managed the city's water department. During World War II, he served as an attorney for the Office of Price Administration.
