= William Jennings (mayor) =

American politician

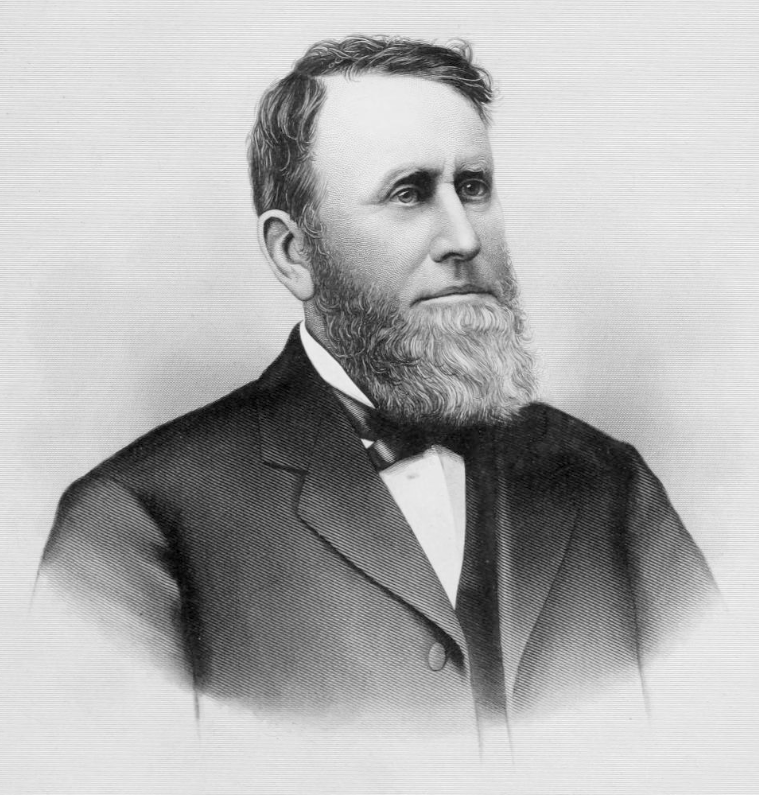

5th Mayor of Salt Lake City
- In office 1882–1884
- Preceded by: Feramorz Little
- Succeeded by: James Sharp
- Constituency: Salt Lake City, Utah

Personal details
- Born: September 13, 1823 Yardley, England
- Died: January 15, 1886 (aged 62) Salt Lake City, Utah, United States
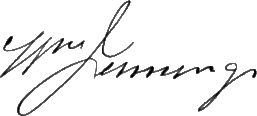
- Signature

William Jennings (September 13, 1823 – January 15, 1886) was the mayor of Salt Lake City, Utah Territory, from 1882 to 1885. A merchant and financier, Jennings has been described as "Utah's first millionaire".

== Biography ==
=== Early life ===
Jennings was born in Yardley, England to a family which was wealthy in the butchering business. He left school at the age of eleven and became an assistant to his sire. He immigrated to the United States in 1847. He worked as a butcher in New York, Ohio, and Missouri and encountered numerous financial problems.

In St. Joseph, Missouri, he married Jane Walker, a member of the Church of Jesus Christ of Latter-day Saints (LDS Church), on July 2, 1851. The newly married couple moved to Salt Lake City in Utah Territory in 1852. Shortly after arriving in Salt Lake City, Jennings was baptized into the LDS Church. Soon afterwards, he married Priscilla Paul as a plural wife.

=== Career in Utah ===
Jennings opened a butchery and tannery in Salt Lake City and later founded a successful mercantile business. In 1864, he had become so successful that he constructed an expensive building, the Eagle Emporium, and used it as his headquarters . The state of his business at that time made Jennings a leading merchant west of the Mississippi River. Eagle Emporium was later sold to the LDS Church and became a central component of Zions Cooperative Mercantile Institution (ZCMI). His mansion, Devereaux, is listed on the National Register of Historic Places.

In 1865, Jennings was elected to the first of two terms in the House of Representatives of the Utah territorial legislature. He became the vice-president of the Utah Central Railroad Company after helping organize it in 1869 and became the president of the Utah Southern Railroad Company. In his later years he was a director for the Deseret National Bank. He was also involved in the ZCMI, acting as superintendent on multiple occasions and as vice-president.

Jennings became a member of the LDS Church's Council of Fifty in 1880. He was elected mayor of Salt Lake City in 1882 and served until 1884. He intended to run for a second term, but he was deemed ineligible under the Edmunds Act because he was a polygamist.

Jennings died in Salt Lake City and was buried in the Salt Lake City Cemetery.

Political offices
Preceded by Feramorz Little	Mayor of Salt Lake City; 1882–1884	Succeeded by James Sharp
