= Francis Armstrong (mayor) =

American politician

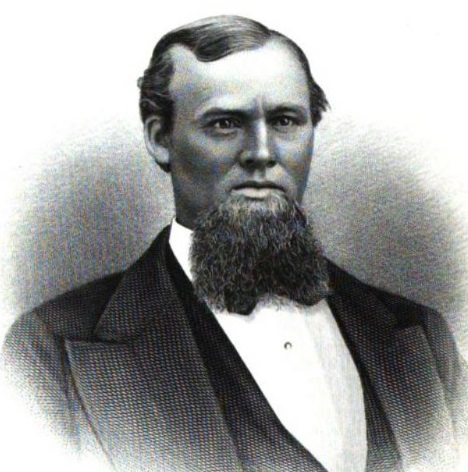
- From 1886's The History of Salt Lake City and Its Founders

7th Mayor of Salt Lake City
- In office 1886–1890
- Preceded by: James Sharp
- Succeeded by: George Montgomery Scott
- Constituency: Salt Lake City, Utah

Personal details
- Born: October 3, 1839 Northumberland, England
- Died: June 15, 1899 (aged 59) Salt Lake City, Utah, United States
- Spouse: Isabella Siddoway
- Parent(s): William and Mary Kirk

Francis "Frank" Armstrong (3 October 1839 – 15 June 1899) was the seventh mayor of Salt Lake City, serving from 1886 to 1890.

== Early life and marriages ==
Armstrong was born in Northumberland, England on 3 October 1839. His family migrated to Canada in 1851 in Hamilton, Ontario. Armstrong went to the Richmond, Missouri in 1858 where he worked in a saw mill. He became friends with David Whitmer, one of the Three Witnesses for the Book of Mormon. Armstrong moved to Utah in 1861. He married his first wife Isabella Siddoway on 10 December 1864, and they resided in Salt Lake City permanently. He also polygamously married Sarah Carruth in 1870 and Maren Jensen in 1887.

== Political career ==
Armstrong was elected as Mayor of Salt Lake City in 1886. He was a member of the Latter-day Saint dominated People's Party until 1896 he was elected as a city commissioner under the Democrat ticket. Armstrong was generally well-liked by both Mormons and non-Mormons in Salt Lake City, with him encouraging the election of non-Mormons into political office.

Political offices
Preceded by James Sharp	Mayor of Salt Lake City; 1886–1890	Succeeded by George Montgomery Scott
