= Richard P. Morris =

American politician

Richard Philip Morris
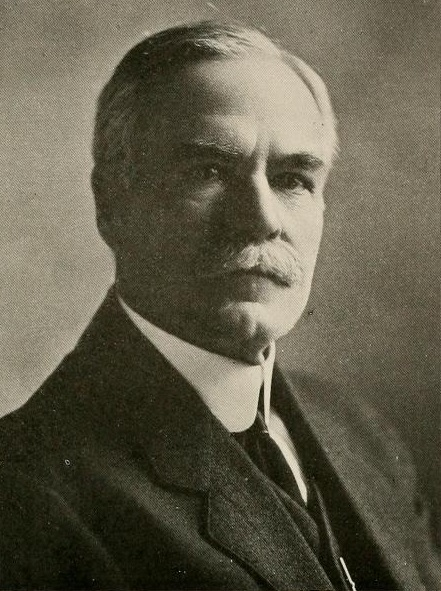
- From 1914's Men of Affairs In the State of Utah

13th Mayor of Salt Lake City
- In office 1904–1905
- Preceded by: Ezra Thompson
- Succeeded by: Ezra Thompson

Personal details
- Born: December 23, 1855 Salt Lake City, Utah
- Died: April 2, 1925 (aged 69) Los Angeles, California
- Party: Independent

Richard P. Morris (December 23, 1855 – April 2, 1925) was an American politician who served as the Mayor of Salt Lake City from 1904 to 1905.
