= John M. Wallace =

American banker, philanthropist, and politician

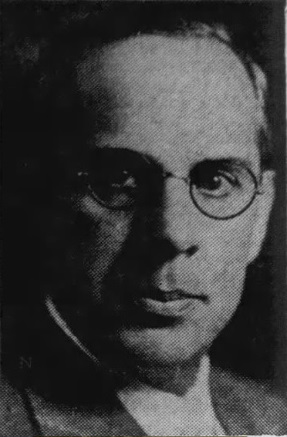
- The Ogden Standard-Examiner, July 1, 1941

23rd Mayor of Salt Lake City
- In office 1938–1940
- Preceded by: E. B. Erwin
- Succeeded by: Ab Jenkins

Member of the Utah State Senate
- In office 1933–1935

Personal details
- Born: December 14, 1893 Salt Lake City, Utah
- Died: February 7, 1989 (aged 95) Salt Lake City, Utah
- Party: Democratic

John McChrystal Wallace (December 14, 1893 – February 7, 1989) was an American banker, philanthropist, and politician. He served in the Utah State Senate from 1933 to 1935 as a Democrat and as the Mayor of Salt Lake City from 1938 to 1940.

== Early life and education ==
Wallace was born on December 14, 1893. He graduated from the University of Utah in 1916, and then attended Harvard Graduate School, receiving his master's of business administration in 1921.

== Career ==
Wallace was a lieutenant in World War I, and later served as an aide to the United States Secretary of the Army.

Wallace served as president and chairman of Walker Bank and established the predecessor to First Interstate Bank. He had a lengthy and diverse career in business, investing in various sectors, ranging from copper mining to hog farming.

Wallace served in the Utah State Senate from 1933 to 1935, and in 1938 was appointed Mayor of Salt Lake City. He served for two years.
