= Feramorz Little =

American politician

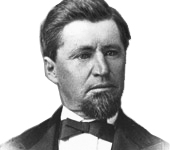
Feramorz Little, c. 1850s

Feramorz Little (June 14, 1820 – August 14, 1887) was the mayor of Salt Lake City, Utah Territory, from 1876 to 1882.

Little was born in Aurelius, New York, to James Little and Susan Young. His mother was a sister to Brigham Young. When Little was a young adult, his widowed mother became a member of the Church of Jesus Christ of Latter Day Saints and moved to Nauvoo, Illinois. Little, much like his Uncle Brigham, was farmed out to relatives and family friends, apprenticing in several trades. Eventually, Little and some friends headed further west.

At times, Little tried his hand at farming. In St Louis, Missouri, he started to prosper as a merchant. Evidently, his credit was good enough that while he left his business in the hands of an employee, while he traveled to Texas to visit with his brother James, who was serving there in the U.S. Army, upon his return, Little found the employee had sold all his goods and run off with the money. Still, he was able to get credit to buy more goods for his store. He traveled to Nauvoo in 1843, to visit family. He married one of the Decker sisters there within the year, and returned to his store in St. Louis.

In 1850, Little followed family members who went with Young to the Salt Lake Valley. Though he was headed to California, he stopped for a while in Salt Lake City, where he decided to stay and try his hand in trade there. He was then not only a nephew to Young, but he also became a brother-in-law. And in Utah Territory, they were partners in at least three enterprises. One was the first saloon in Utah. Another was a gristmill in what became known as Sugarhouse. Young, a Decker brother-in-law, and Ephraim Hanks—another brother-in-law—all co-owned five lumber mills at the mouths of five canyons by the Wasatch Mountains in Salt Lake Valley. The latter two brothers-in-law and Little also became partners as subcontractors in carrying the mail between Salt Lake City and points West of Kansas City. Little was the first contractor to build a canal in Utah, much of the telegraph line coming from eastern points to Salt Lake City; he also built the first territorial prison, which later became the Utah State prison, before it was demolished where Sugarhouse Park now is in Salt Lake City. Little was also a major subcontractor on the transcontinental railroad. He afterwards served on boards for various railroad lines running up and down the state in Utah, and on the boards of various banks. Little became a member of the Church of Jesus Christ of Latter-day Saints (LDS Church) after three or four years in Utah Territory.

Besides being a businessman in Utah Territory, Little was elected the mayor of Salt Lake City for three consecutive terms (1876–78; 1878–80; 1880–82). He was elected as a member of the LDS Church-sponsored People's Party. On April 21, 1880, while mayor of Salt Lake City, Little was initiated as a member of the LDS Church's Council of Fifty.

In 1872, Little had been a missionary for the LDS Church in New York, where he visited and preached to some of his relatives. Little also accompanied a coalition of LDS Church leaders around this time back east to New York, where they sailed first for Europe, visiting and touring through that continent, until they arrived in Palestine to rededicate that land for the return of the Jews. Little's oldest daughter by his first wife accompanied him on this trip; Eliza R. Snow—a polygamous wife of both Joseph Smith, and later Brigham Young, as well as the second general president of the Relief Society of the LDS Church—also accompanied this group on this trip.

Little died at Salt Lake City from typhoid fever. He was buried at the Salt Lake City Cemetery.

== Notes ==
Political offices
Preceded by Daniel H. Wells	Mayor of Salt Lake City; 1876–1882	Succeeded by William Jennings
