= Samuel C. Park =

American politician (1869–1920)

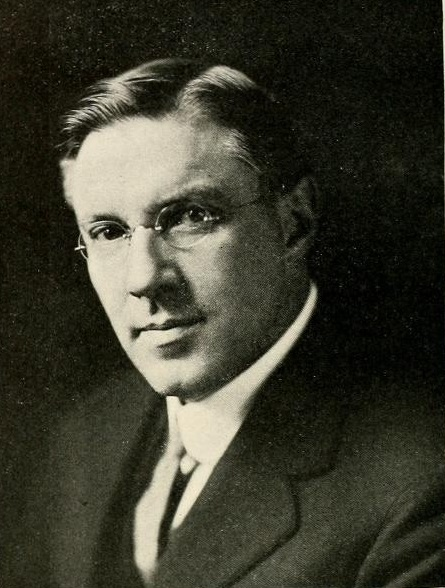
- From 1914's Men of Affairs In the State of Utah

16th Mayor of Salt Lake City
- In office January 1, 1912 – January 3, 1916
- Preceded by: John S. Bransford
- Succeeded by: W. Mont Ferry

Member of the Utah State Senate
- In office 1905–1909 Serving with Stephen H. Love, George N. Lawrence, William N. Williams, Simon Bamberger (1905); Benner X. Smith, William N. Williams, Stephen H. Love, George N. Lawrence (1907)
- Preceded by: George N. Lawrence, Hoyt Sherman, Stephen H. Love, William N. Williams, Simon Bamberger
- Succeeded by: Benner X. Smith, William N. Williams, Stonewall J. Stookey, Charles E. Marks, Carl A. Badger
- Constituency: 6th District

Personal details
- Born: November 1, 1869 Cheyenne, Wyoming Territory
- Died: February 19, 1920 (aged 50) Holladay, Utah
- Resting place: Mount Olivet Cemetery, Salt Lake City, Utah
- Party: Republican
- Spouse: Eleanor "Ella" Thomas (m. 1894)
- Children: 3
- Relatives: Arthur Lloyd Thomas (father in law)
- Education: University of Michigan
- Occupation: Jeweler; Banker

Military service
- Allegiance: United States; Utah
- Years of service: 1898–1908
- Rank: Brigadier General
- Unit: Utah National Guard
- Commands: 1st Infantry Regiment; 1st Infantry Brigade

Samuel C. Park (November 1, 1869 – February 19, 1920) was an American businessman and politician from Utah. A Republican, he served in the Utah State Senate from 1905 to 1909 and on the Salt Lake City School Board from 1909 to 1912. Park served as Mayor of Salt Lake City from 1912 to 1916.

== Biography ==
Samuel Culver Park was born in Cheyenne, Wyoming Territory on November 1, 1869, the son of Boyd Park and Jane (Culver) Park. The Park family relocated to Salt Lake City in 1871, where Boyd Park owned and operated one of the city's first jewelry stores. Samuel Park attended the local schools and Hammond Hall Academy. He graduated from Phillips Exeter Academy in 1889, then attended the University of Michigan as a member of the class of 1891. Park was a longtime member of the university's alumni association.

== Business and civic career ==
Park followed his father into the Boyd Park Inc. jewelry business, which he expanded into jewelry wholesaling and manufacturing as manager, vice president, and president. Park was also active in Salt Lake City's Bank of Commerce, of which he was cashier. In addition, he was active in numerous fraternal and civic organizations, including attaining the 33rd degree of Scottish Rite Masonry. Park was also a Shriner and an Elk. Park also belonged to the Sons of the American Revolution as well as Salt Lake City's Commercial Club and University Club.

== Military career ==
A longtime member of the Utah National Guard, Park was serving as a sergeant in Cavalry Troop A in April 1898 when he received promotion to first sergeant. By late 1899, he had received his commission and been elected lieutenant colonel of Utah's 1st Infantry Regiment. In November 1900, he was elected to command the 1st Regiment as a colonel. He received promotion to brigadier general as commander of the 1st Brigade in 1905. Park later served on the staff of the governor of Utah, and he retired as a brigadier general in 1908.

== Political career ==
A Republican, Park served in the Utah State Senate from 1905 to 1909. From 1909 to 1912 he was a member of the Salt Lake City School Board. In 1911, Park received the honorary degree of Bachelor of Arts from the University of Michigan, as of 1891. In November 1911, Park was elected mayor of Salt Lake City, and he served one term, 1912 to 1916. Park was the first mayor chosen after Salt Lake City adopted a city commission government, and as mayor he was also the city's commissioner of public safety, with jurisdiction over the police, fire, and health departments.

== Death and burial ==
After serving as mayor, Park returned to his business and banking interests. He died at Shady Brook, his country home in Holladay, Utah, on February 19, 1920. He was buried at Salt Lake City's Mount Olivet Cemetery.

== Family ==
In 1894, Park married Eleanor "Ella" Thomas, the daughter of Governor Arthur Lloyd Thomas. They were the parents of three children Boyd, Samuel Jr., and Eleanor.
