= John Clark (Utah politician) =

American politician

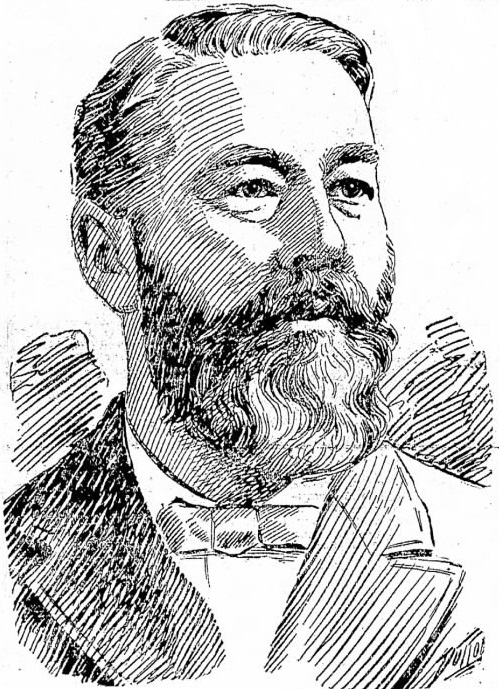
- The Salt Lake Tribune, September 14, 1897

11th Mayor of Salt Lake City
- In office 1898–1899
- Preceded by: James Glendinning
- Succeeded by: Ezra Thompson

Personal details
- Born: April 3, 1834; Chilton, England
- Died: May 5, 1908 (aged 74); Salt Lake City, Utah
- Political party: Independent

John Clark (April 3, 1834 – May 5, 1908) was an American politician who was a mayor of Salt Lake City from 1898 to 1899.

Clark was born in England. His mother died when he was young and his father joined the Church of Jesus Christ of Latter-day Saints. They then moved to Nauvoo, Illinois, where Clark was baptized a member of the Church of Jesus Christ of Latter-day Saints at the age of 10.

Clark came to Utah in 1852, and was a member of the Nauvoo Legion serving both in the Utah War and in conflicts with Native Americans. He was a member of the Salt Lake City council from 1869 to 1888 and a member of the Utah Territorial legislature beginning in 1884.

Clark served a mission for the Church of Jesus Christ of Latter-day Saints in England in 1879, working in the mission office with Joseph F. Smith. He was for many years a ward clerk, then an alternate member of the Salt Lake High council, and then made a regular member of the Ensign Stake High Council when the Salt Lake Stake was divided.
