= E. B. Erwin =

American politician

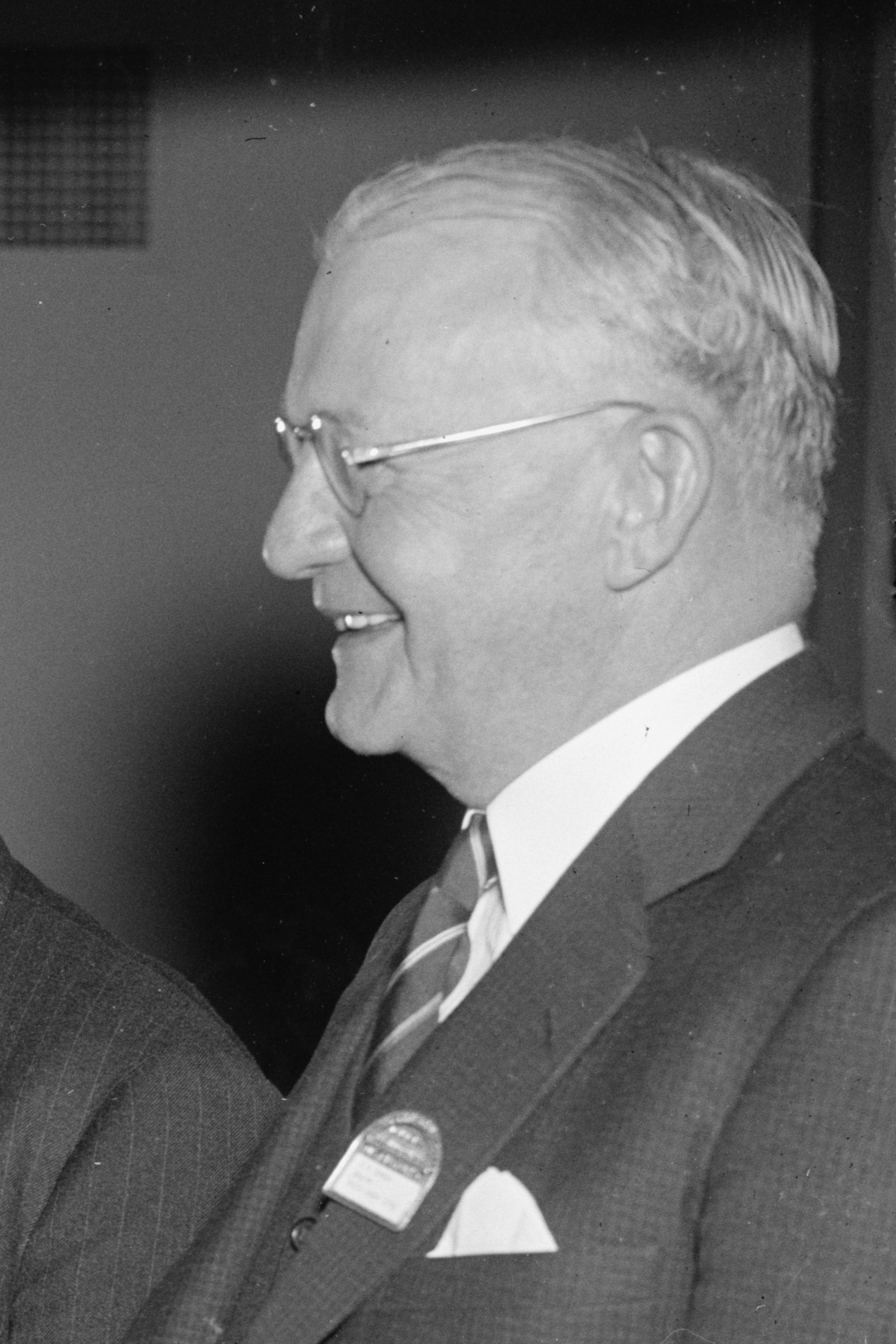
- Erwin in 1937

22nd Mayor of Salt Lake City
- In office 1936–1938
- Preceded by: Louis Marcus
- Succeeded by: John M. Wallace

Personal details
- Party: Independent

E. B. Erwin was an American politician who served as the Mayor of Salt Lake City from 1936 to 1938.
