= Louis Marcus (mayor) =

American politician (1880–1936)

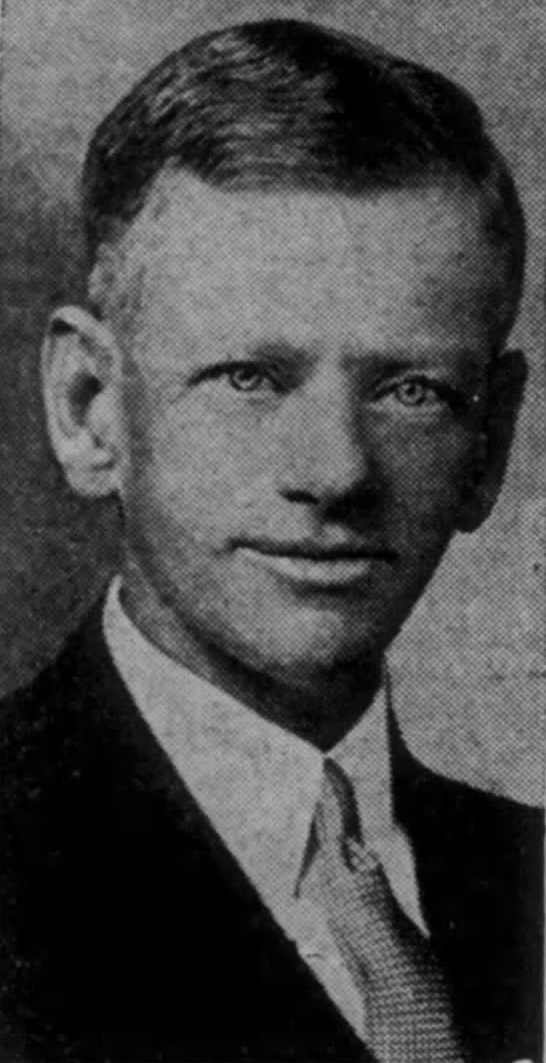
- From the Ogden Standard-Examiner, July 29, 1936

23rd Mayor of Salt Lake City
- In office 1931–1936
- Preceded by: John F. Bowman
- Succeeded by: E. B. Erwin

Personal details
- Born: January 6, 1880 Brooklyn, New York, U.S.
- Died: July 6, 1936 (aged 56) Salt Lake City, Utah, U.S.
- Resting place: Salt Lake City Cemetery

Louis Marcus (January 6, 1880 – July 6, 1936) was an American politician who served as the 23rd mayor of Salt Lake City from 1931 to 1936. Outside of politics, Marcus was also a prominent Idaho and Utah theater operator. As of 2025, Marcus is the only Jewish mayor in the city's one hundred and seventy-eight-year history. He served as mayor until his death on July 6, 1936. He is buried in the Salt Lake City Cemetery.
