= James Glendinning (American politician) =

Mayor of Salt Lake City (1844–1902)

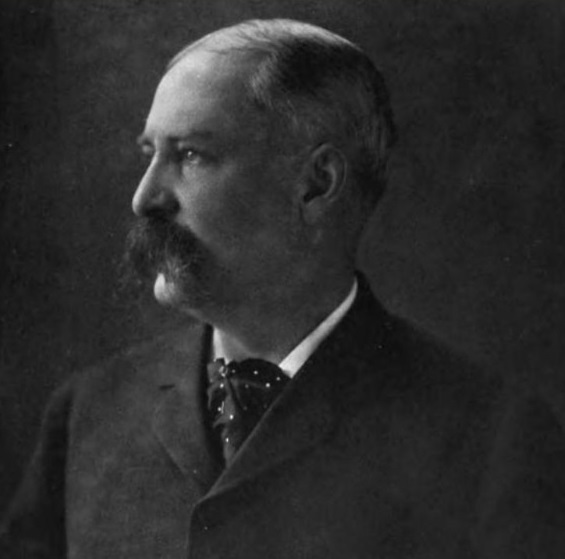
- From 1897's Message of the Mayor with the Annual Reports of the Officers of Salt Lake City

10th Mayor of Salt Lake City
- In office 1896–1897
- Preceded by: Robert N. Baskin
- Succeeded by: John Clark

Personal details
- Born: July 31, 1844 Annan, Dumfriesshire, Scotland
- Died: March 23, 1902 (aged 57) Spokane, Washington, U.S.
- Resting place: Greenwood Memorial Terrace, Spokane, Washington, U.S.
- Party: Republican
- Other political affiliations: Liberal Party of Utah
- Spouse: Margaret Shoup
- Relations: George L. Shoup (brother-in-law)
- Children: 6
- Education: Cooper Union
- Occupation: Businessman

James Glendinning (July 31, 1844 – March 23, 1902) was an American politician who served as the Mayor of Salt Lake City from 1896 to 1897.

Glendinning was born in Annan, Dumfriesshire, Scotland. He attended the schools of his hometown, and moved to the United States at age 20. While residing with an older brother, he completed his education at Cooper Union in New York City, then moved west to establish himself in business. After time in Montana, he moved to Salmon, Idaho, where he was a partner in mining and retailing ventures with George L. Shoup.

In 1884, Glendinning moved to Salt Lake City, where he operated a successful hardware business. A Republican, in 1892 he was elected to a term in the Utah territorial legislature. He served as Salt Lake City's mayor from 1896 to 1897, and was mayor when Utah achieved statehood. In 1899, he was appointed superintendent of federal forests in Idaho and Montana, including the Bitterroot National Forest and he moved to Spokane. He served in this post until retiring a few months before his death.

== Biography ==
James Glendinning was born in Annan, Dumfriesshire, Scotland on July 31, 1844, a son of Robert and Margaret (Blacklock) Glendinning. He was educated in Scotland, and following the deaths of his parents, at age 20 he moved to New York City to reside with an older brother. He completed his education at Cooper Union, and in 1865 moved west to begin his career. After residing briefly in Virginia City, Montana, in 1866 he moved to Leesburg, Idaho, where he partnered with George L. Shoup in ventures including cattle raising, gold mining, and retailing. He subsequently moved to Salmon, Idaho, where he continued in business as the partner of George M. Scott. While living in Idaho, he was Salmon's postmaster for 10 years, and served on the Lemhi County Board of Commissioners from 1870 to 1871.

In 1884, Glendinning moved to Salt Lake City, where he became the owner and operator of a successful hardware business. In 1892, he was a successful Liberal Party candidate for a seat in the Utah Territorial Legislative Assembly. In 1895, he was the successful Republican nominee for mayor, and he served one term, 1896 to 1897.

In 1899, Glendinning accepted a federal appointment as superintendent of federal forests in Idaho and Montana, including the Bitterroot National Forest, and became a resident of Spokane. He served in this post until a few months before his death, when he retired. Glendinning died in Spokane on March 23, 1902. He was buried at Greenwood Memorial Terrace in Spokane.

== Family ==
In 1872, Glendinning married Margaret Shoup, the sister of George L. Shoup. They were the parents of six children, three boys and three girls.
