= List of mayors of Salt Lake City =

This is a list of mayors of Salt Lake City, Utah, USA. Salt Lake City was incorporated on January 6, 1851. The mayor of Salt Lake City is a non-partisan position.

No.	Image	Name	Term began	Term ended	Party
1		Jedediah M. Grant	1851	1857	Independent
2		Abraham O. Smoot	1857	1866	Republican
3		Daniel H. Wells	1866	1876	People's Party of Utah
4		Feramorz Little	1876	1882	People's Party of Utah
5		William Jennings	1882	1884	Independent
6		James Sharp	1884	1886	Independent
7		Frank Armstrong	1886	1890	Independent
8		George Montgomery Scott	1890	1892	Utah Liberal Party
9		Robert N. Baskin	1892	1895	Utah Liberal Party
10		James Glendinning	1896	1897	Independent
11		John Clark	1898	1899	Independent
12		Ezra Thompson	1900	1903	Republican
13		Richard P. Morris	1904	1905	Independent
14		Ezra Thompson	1906	1907	American
15		John S. Bransford	1908	1911	American
16		Samuel C. Park	1912	1916	Independent
17		W. M. Ferry	1916	1919	Republican
18		Edmund A. Bock	1920	1920	Independent
19		Charles Clarence Neslen	1920	1928	Democratic
20		John F. Bowman	1928	1931	Independent
21		Louis Marcus	1932	1935	Republican
22		E. B. Erwin	1936	1938	Independent
23		John M. Wallace	1938	1940	Independent
24		Ab Jenkins	1940	1944	Independent
25		Earl J. Glade	1944	1956	Democratic
26		Adiel F. Stewart	1956	1959	Independent
27		J. Bracken Lee	1960	1971	Republican
28		Jake Garn	1972	1974	Republican
29		Conrad B. Harrison	1974	1976	Independent
30		Ted Wilson	1976	1985	Democratic
31		Palmer DePaulis	1985	1992	Democratic
32		Deedee Corradini	1992	January 3, 2000	Democratic
33		Rocky Anderson	January 3, 2000	January 7, 2008	Democratic
34		Ralph Becker	January 7, 2008	January 4, 2016	Democratic
35		Jackie Biskupski	January 4, 2016	January 6, 2020	Democratic
36		Erin Mendenhall	January 6, 2020	Incumbent	Democratic

== See also ==
- Mayoral elections in Salt Lake City
