= Robert N. Baskin =

American judge

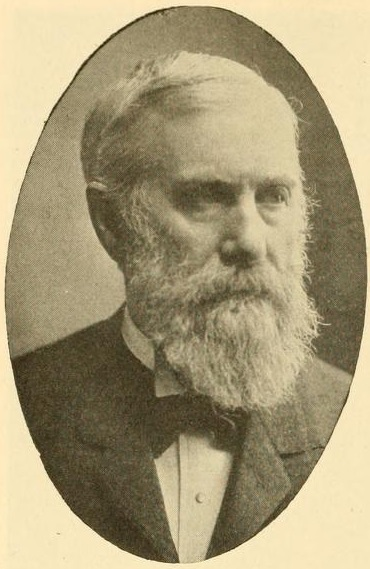
- Born: December 20, 1833; Hillsboro, Ohio
- Died: August 26, 1918 (aged 84); Salt Lake City, Utah
- Known for: Attorney, judge, and politician; leading figure in the Liberal Party

Robert Newton Baskin (December 20, 1833 – August 26, 1918) was an American politician and lawyer in the state of Utah.

== Biography ==
Robert N. Baskin was born in Hillsboro, Ohio on December 20, 1833. He attended Salem Academy, near Chillicothe, Ohio and studied law with the firm of James H. Thompson in Salem, Ohio. En route for California, Baskin visited the Little Cottonwood mining district with Thomas Hearst and saw possibilities in the minerals of Utah Territory and decided to stay.

Baskin became friends with a Dr. Robinson in Salt Lake City who was assassinated on October 22, 1866. Dr. Robinson was building the first public hospital in Salt Lake City when the police tore it down and warned him not to "renew his operations there." Brigham Young later said about Dr. Robinson's hospital: "The band of men had done wrong; that instead of going by night to destroy the building, they should have gone through it in broad day." Dr. Robinson contacted Baskin in contemplation of bringing a suit to recover damages for the destruction of his property. A few weeks after the suit was instituted Dr. Robinson was called from his bed at midnight by some unknown person who said that a friend of Dr. Robinson was injured. Ignoring the advice from his wife he went with the person, but at the corner of Third South and Main in downtown Salt Lake he was beaten to death. Standing over the mutilated body of his friend, Baskin resolved that he would do all in his power to increase federal authority in Utah, as a prominent Harvard trained, Protestant attorney in Utah. According to an article appearing in the Deseret News on August 26, 1918, "he did much to develop Utah mines, prosecuted John D. Lee, wrote his Reminiscences, exposed Mormon Apostle Orson F. Whitney, and was active in politics, especially against polygamy. He drew and procured the Cullom Bill, was mayor of Salt Lake City elected under the Utah Liberal Party in 1892, and was associate justice of the Supreme Court of Utah (sworn in January 3, 1899). Baskin died at his home in Salt Lake City on August 26, 1918.

He faced criticism from some such as the editor of the Deseret News who said that the paper "found it necessary to oppose his operations and criticize his methods with all the force it could command". However, the editor also commented that the paper later "found itself able to conscientiously support him for high public office, and to commend his official acts and policies". In his reply he says, "I assure the Mormon people I am not their enemy, but their friend...I openly, and above board honestly and untiringly strove to Americanize theocratic Utah".

He was a Freemason, being a member of Mount Moriah Lodge No. 2 of the Free and Accepted Masons of Utah, having gone through the three degrees sometime prior to the 1872 Proceedings of that Grand Lodge where he is listed as a member; according to records of subsequent annual proceedings, he remained a member for the rest of his life.

Political offices
Preceded by George Montgomery Scott	Mayor of Salt Lake City; 1892–1895	Succeeded by James Glendinning
