= Edmund T. Hulaniski =

American politician

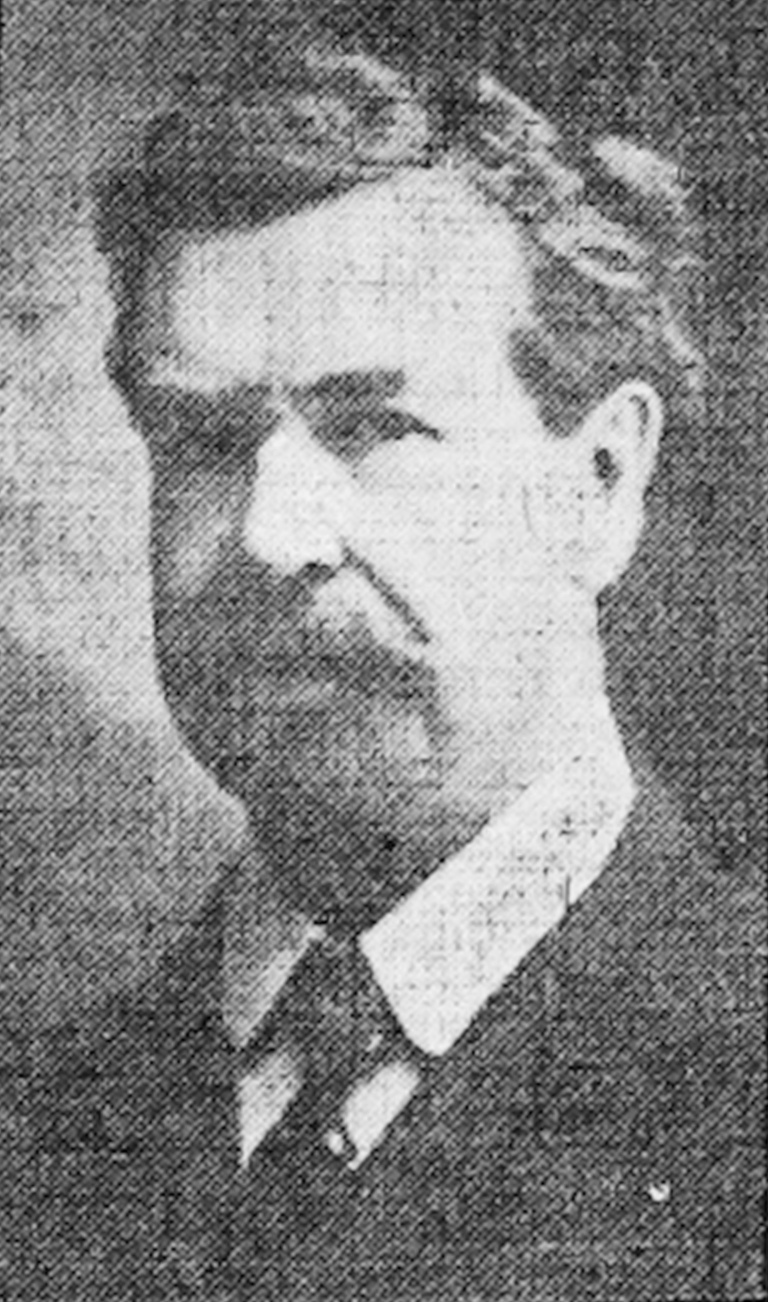
Edmund T. Hulaniski

Edmund Tuttle Hulaniski (June 19, 1848 – April 15, 1928)was a prominent politician in late 19th-century and early 20th-century Utah. He was a member of the Republican Party.

Hulaniski was born in Michigan. He served in the Union Army during the American Civil War. He then studied law and took work as an attorney working for various railroads eventually settling in Ogden, Utah.

Hulaniski was a member of the Utah State Senate from 1907 to 1909. He was also a district attorney, a police judge and chairman of both the Weber County and Ogden City Republican Parties.

== Sources ==
- Jefferson Avenue Historic District report
- Standard-Examiner article mentioning Hulaniski
