= John Augustine Marshall =

American judge

Judge of the United States District Court for the District of Utah
- In office February 4, 1896 – September 8, 1915
- Appointed by: Grover Cleveland
- Preceded by: Seat established by 28 Stat. 107
- Succeeded by: Tillman D. Johnson

Personal details
- Born: John Augustine Marshall; September 5, 1854 Warrenton, Virginia
- Died: April 4, 1941 (aged 86) Salt Lake City, Utah
- Education: University of Virginia School of Law (LL.B.)

John Augustine Marshall (September 5, 1854 – April 4, 1941) was a United States district judge of the United States District Court for the District of Utah.

== Education and career ==
Born on September 5, 1854, near Warrenton, Virginia, Marshall received a Bachelor of Laws in 1874 from the University of Virginia School of Law. He entered private practice in Warrenton from 1874 to 1878. He continued private practice in Salt Lake City, Utah Territory (State of Utah from January 4, 1896) from 1878 to 1896. He was a Judge of the Salt Lake County Territorial Probate Court from 1888 to 1889. He was a territorial representative for Salt Lake County in 1892.

== Federal judicial service ==
Marshall was nominated by President Grover Cleveland on January 13, 1896, to the United States District Court for the District of Utah, to a new seat authorized by 28 Stat. 107. He was confirmed by the United States Senate on February 4, 1896, and received his commission the same day. His service terminated on September 8, 1915, due to his resignation.

== Later career and death ==
Following his resignation from the federal bench, Marshall resumed private practice in Salt Lake City from 1915 to 1924. He died on April 4, 1941, in Salt Lake City.

== Sources ==
Legal offices
Preceded by Seat established by 28 Stat. 107	Judge of the United States District Court for the District of Utah; 1896–1915	Succeeded by Tillman D. Johnson
