= Ezra Thompson =

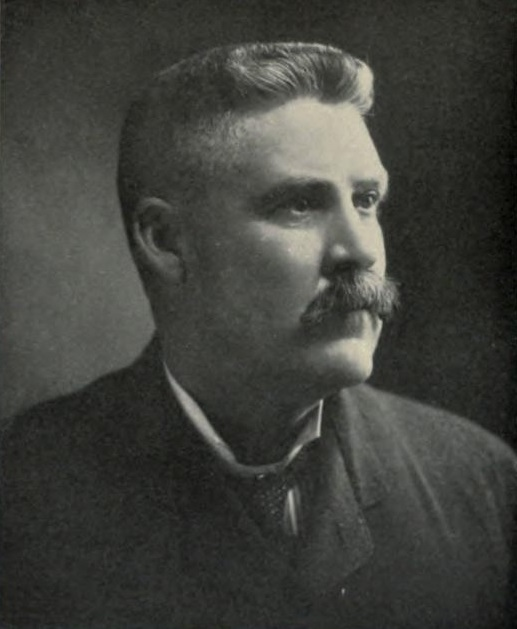
- From 1902's Utah, The Inland Empire

12th and 14th Mayor of Salt Lake City
- In office 1900–1903
- In office 1906–1907

Personal details
- Born: July 17, 1850 Salt Lake City, Provisional State of Deseret
- Died: April 8, 1923 (aged 72) Salt Lake City, Utah
- Political party: Republican, American
- Spouse: Emily Pugsley (m. 1885)
- Children: 4
- Occupation: Businessman, politician
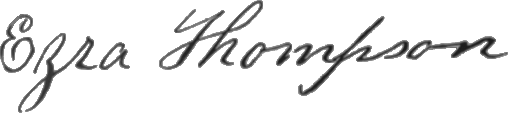
- Signature

Ezra Thompson (1850–1923) was the 12th and 14th mayor of Salt Lake City, Utah, US, who was elected three times and served two non-consecutive terms. He was mayor from 1900 to 1903 and 1906 to 1907.

== Early life ==
Thompson was born on July 17, 1850, in Salt Lake City in the Provisional State of Deseret, just months before Utah Territory was created. He made his fortune in a Park City mining venture with future United States Senator from Utah Thomas Kearns. He married Emily Pugsley on February 14, 1885, and they had four children.

== Political career ==
=== First term ===
In 1899, he was elected mayor of Salt Lake City on the Republican Party ticket. He was re-elected in 1901 and served until 1903.

In January 1903, Thompson was a signatory of an official protest to the United States Senate of the Utah Legislature's election of Mormon Apostle Reed Smoot as a United States senator for Utah.

=== Second term ===
In September 1904, Thompson was one of the founders of the anti-Mormon American Party. The party's principal goal was to eliminate the influence of the Church of Jesus Christ of Latter-day Saints (LDS Church) over politics in Utah. In 1905, He was the new party's candidate for mayor, and he was elected; four other elected members of the city council were also members of the American Party. During this term, he was an outspoken critic of the LDS Church and accused church leaders of continuing to sanction the practice of plural marriage.

In 1907, Thompson's chief of police, George Sheets, was accused of bribery. Although formally cleared of charges, Sheets nevertheless resigned and Thompson followed five days later on August 2, 1907. His stated reason for resigning was ill health. He was replaced as mayor by American Party leader John S. Bransford, who was subsequently elected to a full term in the 1907 election.

Thompson died in Salt Lake City on April 8, 1923. One of the city's largest landowners, his estate was valued at over $2.5 million.

Political offices
Preceded by John Clark	Mayor of Salt Lake City; 1900–1903	Succeeded by Richard P. Morris
Preceded by Richard P. Morris	Mayor of Salt Lake City; 1906–1907	Succeeded by John S. Bransford
