= James Sharp (mayor) =

American politician

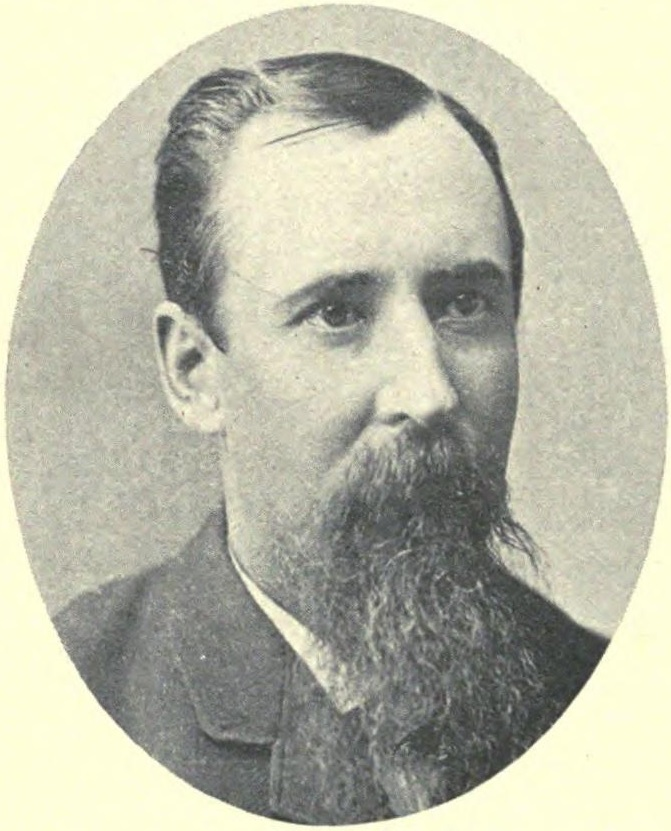
- From volume one (1914) of Pioneers and Prominent Men of Utah

6th Mayor of Salt Lake City
- In office 1884–1886
- Preceded by: William Jennings
- Succeeded by: Francis Armstrong
- Constituency: Salt Lake City, Utah

Personal details
- Born: November 18, 1843 Falkirk, Stirlingshire, Scotland
- Died: May 7, 1904 (aged 60) Salt Lake City, Utah, United States

James Sharp (18 November 1843 – 7 May 1904) was the sixth mayor of Salt Lake City, serving from 1884 to 1886. For several years, Sharp was also a member of the University of Utah board of regents. He was that university's chancellor from 1882 to 1883.

== Early life and career ==
Sharp was born in Falkirk, Stirlingshire, Scotland on 18 November 1843. He was the son of John Sharp, a leader in the Church of Jesus Christ of Latter-day Saints who was also a director of the Union Pacific Railroad. Sharp came to America in 1848 settling in St. Louis. In 1850 he journeyed to Salt Lake City. In 1862, he served under the command of Lot Smith during the Utah War. Sharp succeeded as director of Union Pacific Railroad after his father. In 1876, he was elected to the Utah territorial legislature and was the speaker of the House of Representatives from 1884 to 1886. Sharp was elected as mayor in 1884 and served until 1886.

== Personal revelation in 1902 trial ==
In 1902, Sharp testified in a case against Peter Mortensen who was accused of the murder of Sharp's son-in-law, James R. Hay. His testimony caused a significant amount of controversy and discussion for asserting that "God revealed it me" when asked how he knew Mortensen murdered Hay. This blending of a criminal trial with individual revelation went on to inspire Sir Arthur Conan Doyle's The Edge of the Unknown (1930). After a clear public outcry, Sharp's testimony was eventually stricken from the trial's evidence record.

Political offices
| Preceded by William Jennings | Mayor of Salt Lake City; 1884–1886 | Succeeded by Francis Armstrong |
