= John S. Bransford =

American politician

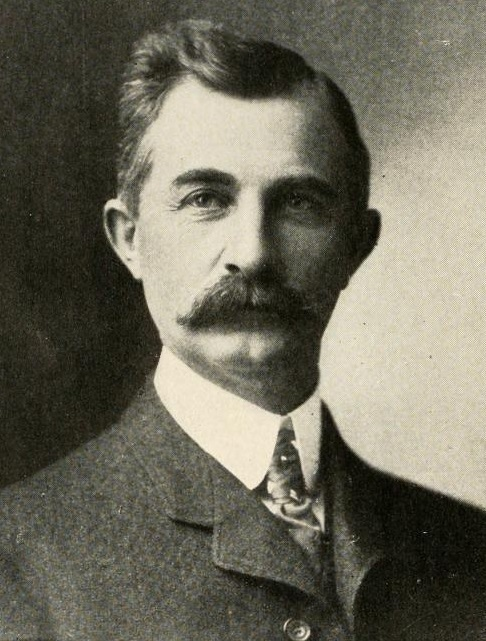
- From 1908's Salt Lake City, Past and Present
- Preceded by: Ezra Thompson
- Succeeded by: Samuel C. Park

Mayor of Salt Lake City, Utah
- In office 1908–1911
- Preceded by: Ezra Thompson
- Succeeded by: Samuel C. Park

Personal details
- Born: August 26, 1856 Richmond, Missouri
- Died: May 21, 1944 (aged 87) Salt Lake City, Utah
- Resting place: Mount Olivet Cemetery, Salt Lake City, Utah
- Party: Democratic
- Other political affiliations: American Party (Utah)
- Spouse: Rachel Stella (Blood) Bransford (m. 1878)
- Children: 3

John Samuel Bransford (August 26, 1856 – May 21, 1944) was the 15th mayor of Salt Lake City, Utah from 1907 to 1911.

== Biography ==
Bransford was born in Richmond, Missouri. As a child, Bransford had traveled the Mormon Trail with his family on their journey to California in 1864, stopping temporarily in Salt Lake City. In Plumas County, California, Bransford was a county assessor from 1886 to 1890 and served three terms as the county sheriff. He was elected to these positions as a Democrat.

Bransford moved to Salt Lake City in 1899 and remained there permanently. In 1900, Bransford was elected the president of the Salt Lake Stock and Mining Exchange. In 1904, he joined Utah's anti-Mormon American Party, but remained a member of the Democratic Party.

Bransford became the mayor on August 13, 1907, 11 days after Ezra Thompson resigned due to ill health and accusations of corruption. Bransford was unanimously elected by the city council as the replacement for Thompson. Bransford served out the remainder of Thompson's term and was elected mayor in the election of 1907. He was re-elected in 1909, and served until the end of his second elected term in 1911.

As leader of the American Party, Bransford was considerably less vocal in his anti-Mormonism than his predecessor had been, and the leaders of the Church of Jesus Christ of Latter-day Saints were much relieved to have Bransford rather than Thompson leading the city where their church was headquartered.

Bransford's most notable achievement as mayor was the creation of a walled red-light district in Salt Lake City, known as the "Stockade", which restricted the prostitutes of the city to working in the square block between 100 and 200 South and between 500 and 600 West.

After Bransford left office, the American Party collapsed. He was a delegate from Utah to the 1912 Democratic National Convention and was a member of the Platform and Rules Committee.

== See also ==
- List of mayors of Salt Lake City

Political offices
Preceded by Ezra Thompson	Mayor of Salt Lake City; 1908–1911	Succeeded by Samuel C. Park
