= Liberal Party (Utah) =

Former political party in Utah, USA

- Founded: 1870
- Dissolved: 1893
- Succeeded by: American Party (not legal successor)
- Ideology: Anti-clericalism; Anti-Mormonism; Big tent Liberalism; Classical liberalism Republicanism
- Political position: Center-left

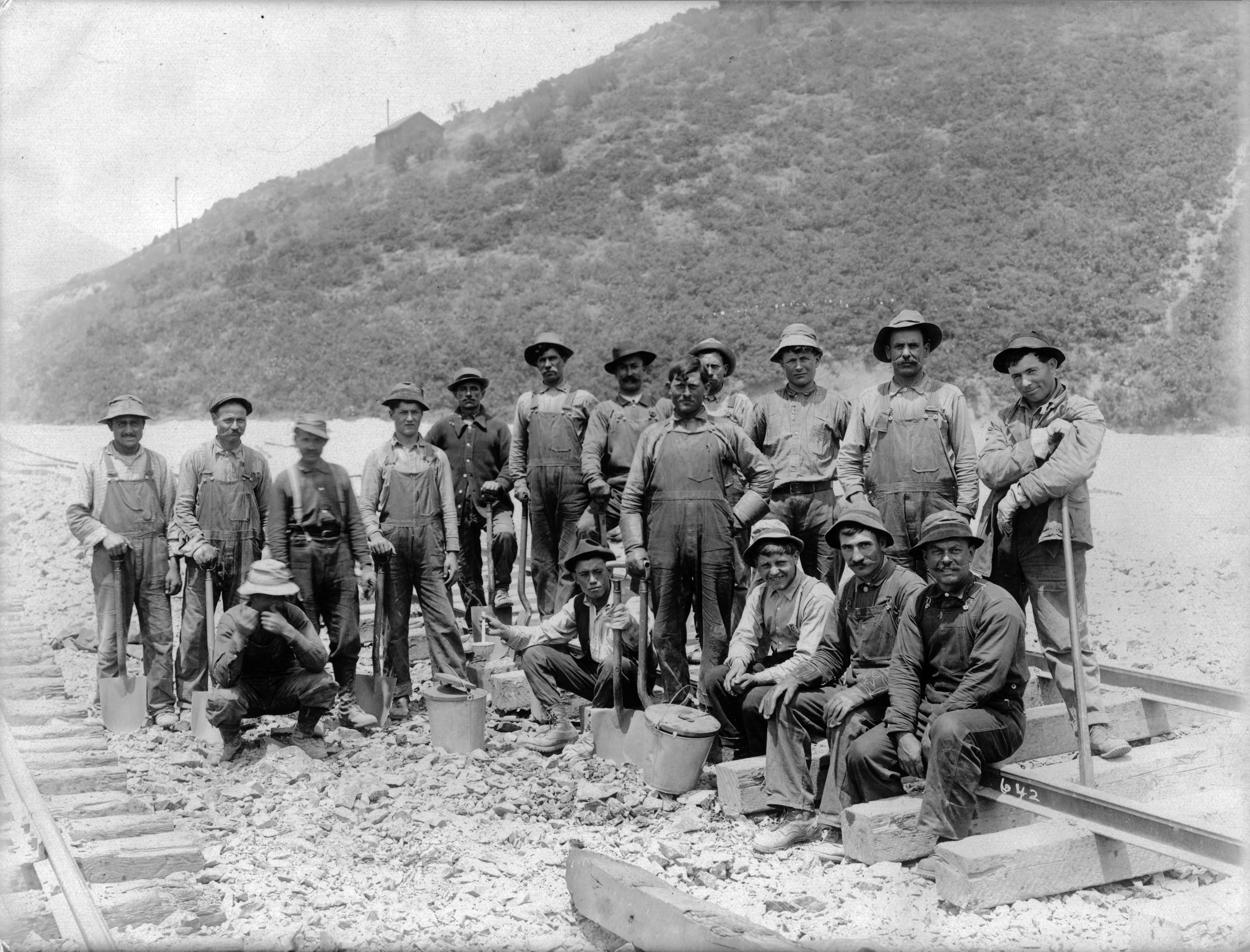
The Liberal Party believed the economic future of Utah Territory lay in mining, and Utah miners, typically non-Mormon, often became key Liberal Party voters.

The Liberal Party was a political party established in the latter half of the 1800s in Utah Territory before the national Democrats and Republicans established themselves in Utah in the early 1890s.

The Liberal Party formed in 1870 in opposition to the Latter-day Saints (Mormons) who were the majority of Utah’s population. In response, the Mormons formed the People's Party.

The Liberal Party won several local elections in Utah. Anti-Mormonism remained a central theme of the party until it disbanded in 1893 and was absorbed by the national parties.

== Origins ==
The impetus for the setting up of the Liberal Party came from William S. Godbe, a successful businessman and Latter-day Saint who founded a journal called Utah Magazine in 1868. Godbe and several business associates challenged the economic policies of LDS Church President Brigham Young in the monthly periodical, especially Young's opposition to mining. When increasingly harsh condemnations aimed at LDS leadership appeared, the LDS Church excommunicated key "Godbeites" on October 25, 1869.

Corresponding during the winter, key Godbeites and non-Mormons made an uneasy alliance based on their shared opposition to LDS control over temporal matters in the territory.

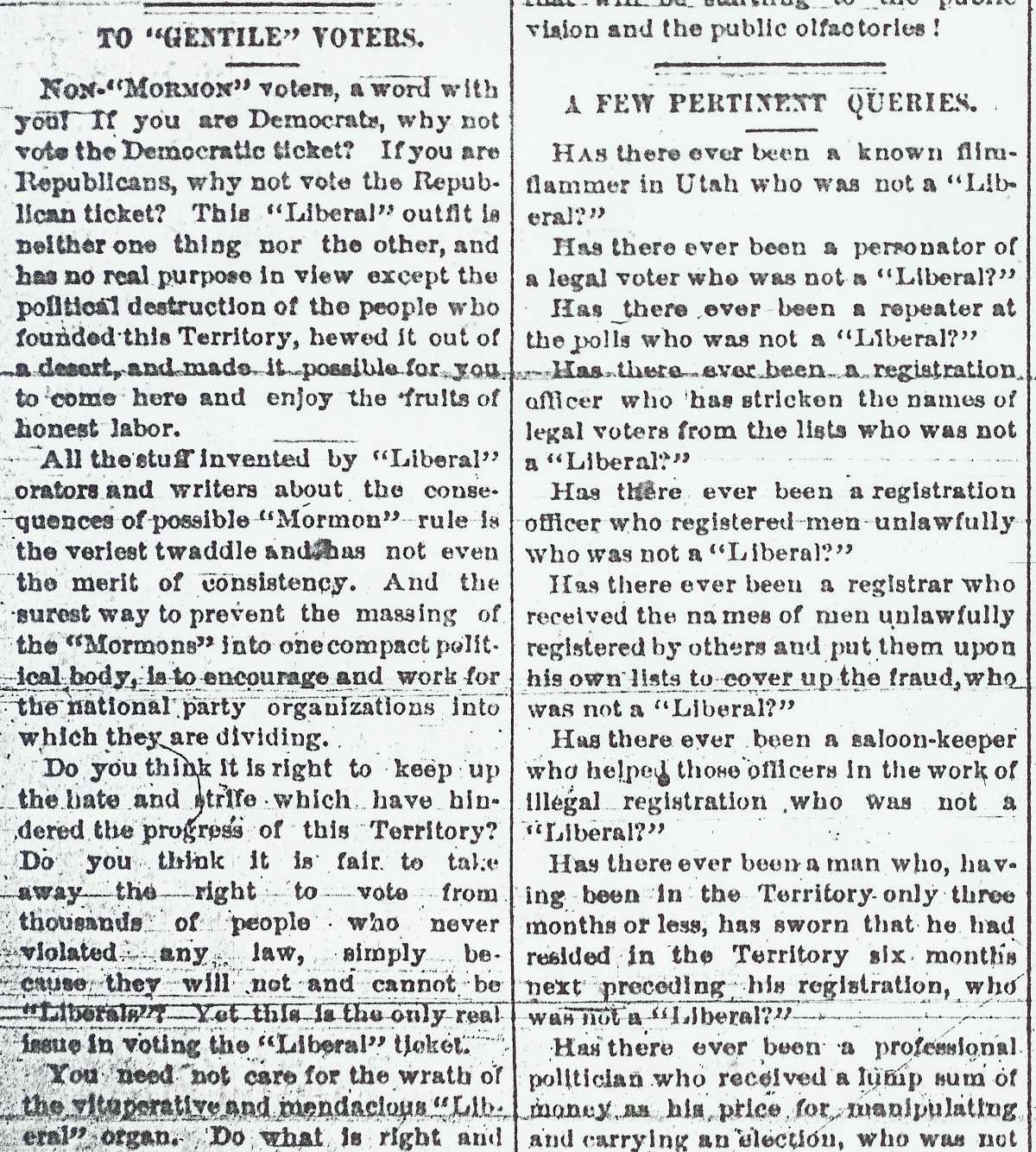
The Deseret Evening News, owned by the LDS Church, served as the de facto People's Party organ and regularly denounced the Liberal Party in its pages.

The Liberal Party formed after a meeting on February 9, 1870 to select independent candidates for the Salt Lake City municipal election. The organizers billed the occasion as a meeting of the "people." A crowd of Latter-day Saints, encouraged by local bishops and a Deseret Evening News editorial, attended in numbers and nearly hijacked the meeting. After the LDS crowd had selected its own slate of candidates, frustrated Godbeite Eli B. Kelsey asked the Mormons to leave, which they did. The remaining non-Mormons selected an independent municipal ticket, forming the Liberal Party. Liberal leaders intended that their party's name suggest reform and evoke Britain's Liberal Party.

In response, Latter-day Saints formed the People's Party, a title that was selected to suggest popularity; it alluded to the Liberal Party's disrupted meeting of "the people". Latter-day Saints had previously won virtually all elections unchallenged.

Early Liberal Party speakers carefully avoided condemning LDS theology or polygamy, because several Godbeites themselves practised polygamy. Eli B. Kelsey and Henry W. Lawrence, both Godbeites, gained election as the first officers of the new party. Non-Mormons, including Robert N. Baskin, George R. Maxwell, and Judge Dennis Toohy of Corinne, played an active role in the party but stayed in the background initially, hoping that ex-Mormon Godbeites would prove more effective leaders and candidates.

Godbeites believed they should reform Utah and the LDS Church to adopt more politically-progressive policies, but the non-Mormon element of the party took a more adversarial line. Non-Mormon partisans, especially miners and railroad workers, would increasingly dominate party leadership. Through the 1870s, the Liberal Party grew less appeasing of Godbeites and more openly anti-Mormon and anti-polygamy. Waning Godbeite influence was shown even by 1871, when Liberals Dennis Toohy and George R. Maxwell infuriated Godbeites at a party meeting by calling polygamists "dupes" and criminals of perverse sensuality.

Like many political parties of the time, the Liberal Party ran a newspaper although unofficially. Godbe's Utah Magazine became the Mormon Weekly Tribune and in 1873, three anti-Mormon newcomers from Kansas bought it and it became The Salt Lake Tribune. Until the Liberal Party disbanded in 1893, the Tribune would operate as the Liberal Party's de facto political organ. Similarly, the Deseret Evening News, owned by the LDS Church, often functioned as a People's Party organ.

== History ==
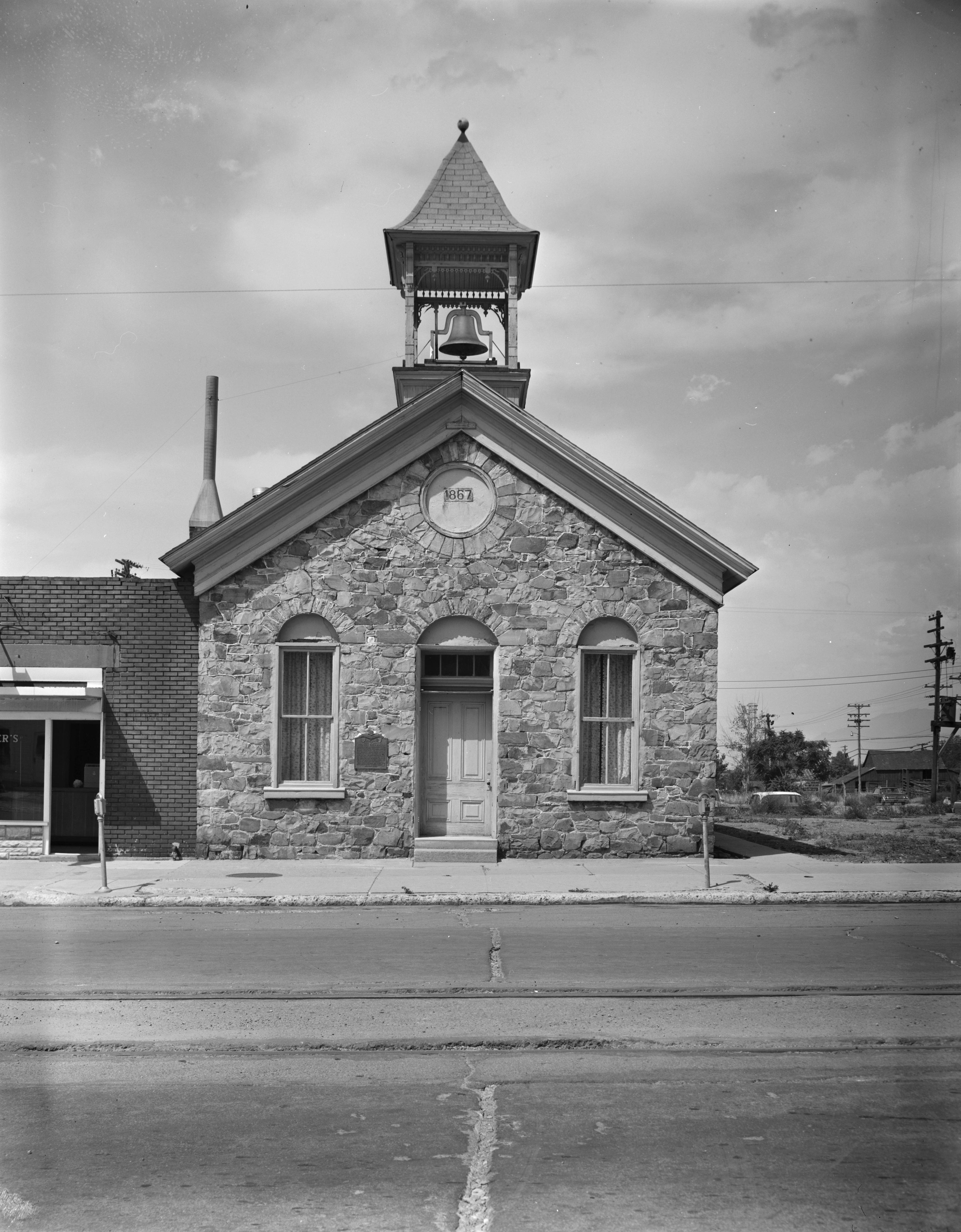
The Old Tooele County Courthouse, the site of the contentious Tooele Republic power struggle in 1874

Unsurprisingly, the Liberal Party performed poorly against the Mormon majority. In the 1870 Salt Lake City mayoral race, Liberal Henry W. Lawrence lost to Daniel H. Wells 321 to 2301. Statewide contests produced even more lopsided figures, with Liberals regularly failing to garner 10% of the vote. Although Liberals never won a single statewide office, the party served as a political foil and won several local elections, including:

- The so-called Tooele Republic in 1874
- Summit County in 1885
- Ogden, Utah in 1889
- Salt Lake City, Utah in 1890

When the party first formed in 1870, party officials tried to win offices in the town of Corrine and reasoned that they could more readily overwhelm the small local population. They failed but continued to scout other promising areas.

In Tooele County, perhaps the only non-Mormon majority in the territory existed. Its residents, mostly transitory miners, congregated in Utah after US Army General Patrick Edward Connor encouraged his men to prospect for minerals, which they discovered west of Salt Lake City in 1864.

The Liberal Party, campaigning voraciously in mining towns, won a disputed election in August 1874. The People's Party incumbents, citing fraud, refused to yield their positions even as US Marshals authorized by the 3rd District federal court attempted to intervene and install the Liberal candidates. Brigham Young advised his followers to abide by the federal court, which they finally did.

Liberals carried all offices in the county, which they called the Tooele Republic. Running unopposed in 1876, Liberals held the county until the Utah territorial legislature passed bills in 1878 that required voter registration and instituting women's suffrage. The Liberal Party, typically supported by male miners casually interested in politics, opposed both measures. In 1878 the Liberal electoral majority in Tooele County disappeared, and the People's Party regained control in 1879, after more than six months of Liberal procedural delays.

=== Contest for representative to Congress ===
By 1880, the Liberal Party was back to being shut out of elected office, but it was openly supported by the newly appointed strongly anti-Mormon territorial governor, Eli H. Murray. Thus, the 1880 statewide election for the US House of Representatives unexpectedly proved the closest that the Liberal Party got to sending a representative to Washington, DC.

The Liberal candidate, Allen G. Campbell, with 1357 votes, lost resoundingly to Mormon General Authority George Q. Cannon who had 18,567 votes. In fact, the election marked the all-time low percentage-wise showing for any Liberal House candidate. However, before Governor Murray certified the election, a protest on behalf of Campbell was filed. The protest listed a dozen claims, chiefly that Cannon, born in Liverpool, England; was not a naturalized alien, and was a polygamist, which was incompatible with the law and a delegate's oath of office. Murray agreed, and issued certification to Campbell in spite of the latter's poor showing.

George Q. Cannon, then in Washington, DC, argued that only Congress could decide on a member's qualifications. He furthermore received a certificate from sympathetic territorial election officials that stated he had received the most votes. The document convinced the House of Representatives clerk to enter Cannon's name on the roll and so Cannon began drawing delegate's salary.

Both Murray and Campbell traveled to Washington to dispute the seat. Each side battled over the position for over a year even despite the assassination and eventual death of President James Garfield. On February 25, 1882, the House of Representatives finally rejected both candidates. The House refused Cannon his seat not for his dubious citizenship but for his practice of polygamy. The entire ordeal actually brought unfavorable national attention to the "Mormon Situation" on polygamy.

In a November 7, 1882 election to fill the vacated seat, the Liberal Party fielded Philip T. Van Zile, but the seat was ultimately won by John T. Caine, of the People's Party. Of the 33,266 registered voters, 23,039 votes were cast for Caine, and Van Zile received 4884. About 12,000 people were excluded from registering based on suspicion of polygamy.

=== Political realignment and dissolution ===
National outrage against polygamy benefited the Liberal Party and helped it to subsequent electoral victories. On March 23, 1882, the Edmunds Act became law, prohibiting polygamists from voting or holding office. It also established a five-member body, which came to be known as the Utah Commission, to oversee all matters related to elections in Utah Territory. The even stronger Edmunds-Tucker Act, was enacted on March 3, 1887. This measure again disenfranchised women while requiring men to take an oath to abide by anti-bigamy laws in order to vote.

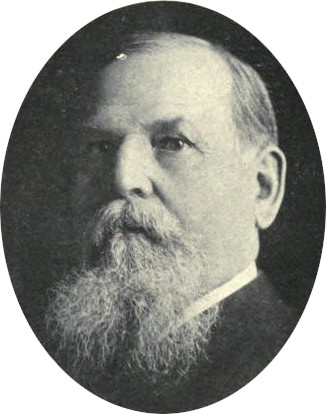
Fred J. Kiesel, elected as Liberal mayor of Ogden in 1889

Liberals were thus able to elect a representative from Summit County to the 1886 territorial legislature and saw their numbers increase in subsequent election cycles. They swept the city government of Ogden, Utah in 1889 but did not succeed in carrying the Weber County government. In 1890, the Liberal Party took Salt Lake City, and George M. Scott became the first non-Mormon mayor of Salt Lake, by a margin of 808 votes. In 1892, long-time Liberal stalwart Robert N. Baskin succeeded Scott as mayor of Salt Lake.

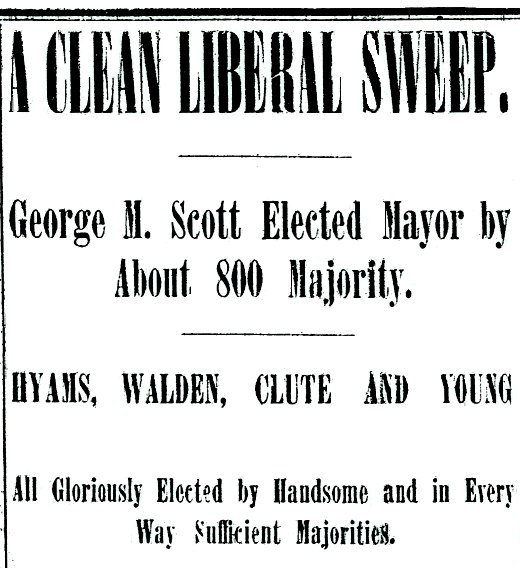
The Salt Lake Tribune triumphantly declares Liberal Party victory in Salt Lake City.

Meanwhile, the LDS Church issued an 1890 Manifesto officially discontinuing support for the practice of polygamy. As the prospect of statehood for Utah became increasingly viable, political leaders thought it advisable to reorganize along national party lines. Democratic and Republican conventions organized throughout the territory, and the People's Party officially disbanded ahead of the August 1891 election. Propelled by success in Salt Lake City and Ogden, the Liberal Party reached a high-water mark with a third of the seats in the territorial legislature that year, but remained behind the Democrats who now dominated.

Due to its explicit anti-Mormon leanings, the Liberal Party struggled to appeal to monogamist Mormons and even those who were estranged or not particularly active in the LDS Church. Meanwhile, the national parties were showing that they could readily provide a political space in which Mormons and non-Mormons could coexist. Outside of its urban strongholds and mining districts, the Liberal Party had little presence and its candidates in 1891 mostly ran a distant third behind those of the Democratic and Republican parties.

By the next legislative election in 1893, the Liberals could muster a ticket only in Salt Lake City and abandoned efforts elsewhere in Utah. (Jacob Johnson, who had run as a Liberal from Sanpete County in 1891, won a seat as a Republican.) Although most of the Liberal candidates actually won in three-way races in Salt Lake City, its members also felt the pull to align with their national parties. Consequently, the next party convention voted to disband on December 18, 1893. The former Liberals still affected the balance of power, as they contributed to Republicans securing a majority in the final legislature before statehood, including as the decisive numbers in the Territorial Council (the upper house).

Where they were able to govern at a municipal level, the Deseret Evening News and other LDS papers characterized Liberal Party administrations as wasteful. The party outspent revenue in Tooele, Ogden, and Salt Lake City, accumulating relatively large public debts. However, the Liberal Party characterized its expenditures as essential for civic improvements. In Salt Lake City, the Liberals constructed the city's first sewer, called the "gravity sewer," which the Deseret News characterized as graft. The Salt Lake Liberals also constructed an ornate and expensive joint Salt Lake City and County Building. Former Liberals such as Baskin defended the reputation and legacy of the Liberal Party well into the 20th century.

== See also ==
- Anti-Mormon Party (Illinois)
- The Church of Jesus Christ of Latter-day Saints and politics in the United States
