= 1910 Pennsylvania gubernatorial election =

- November 8, 1910
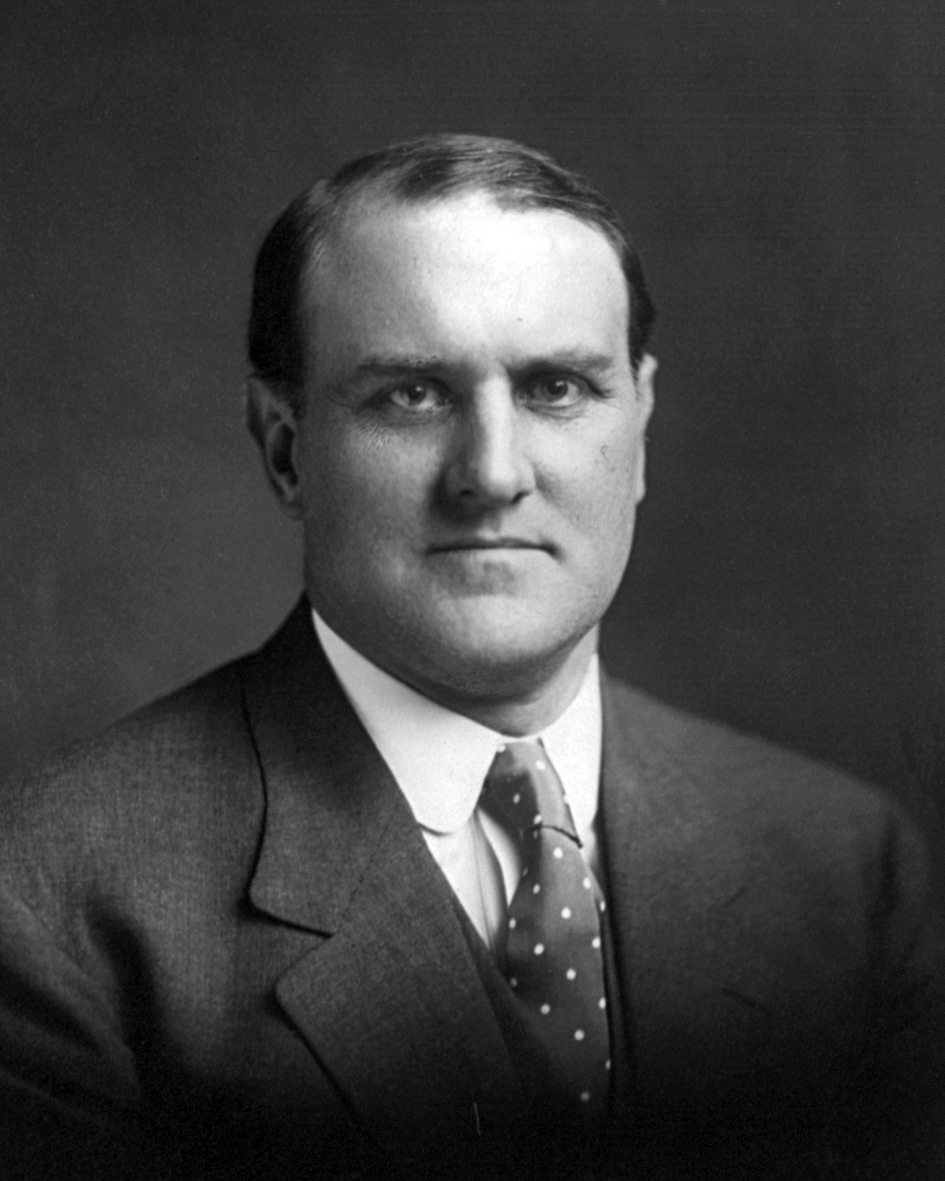

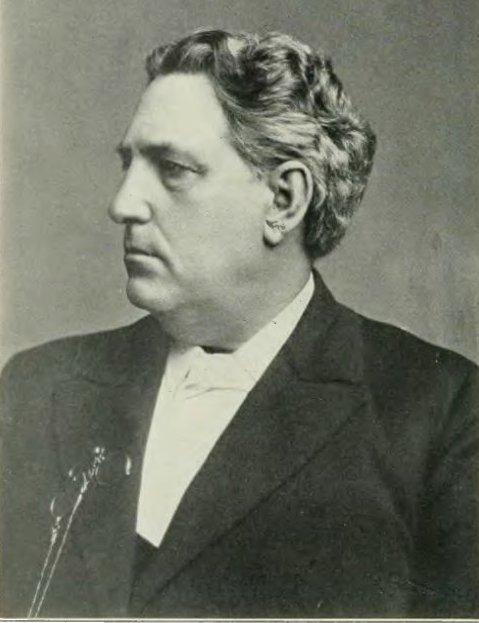

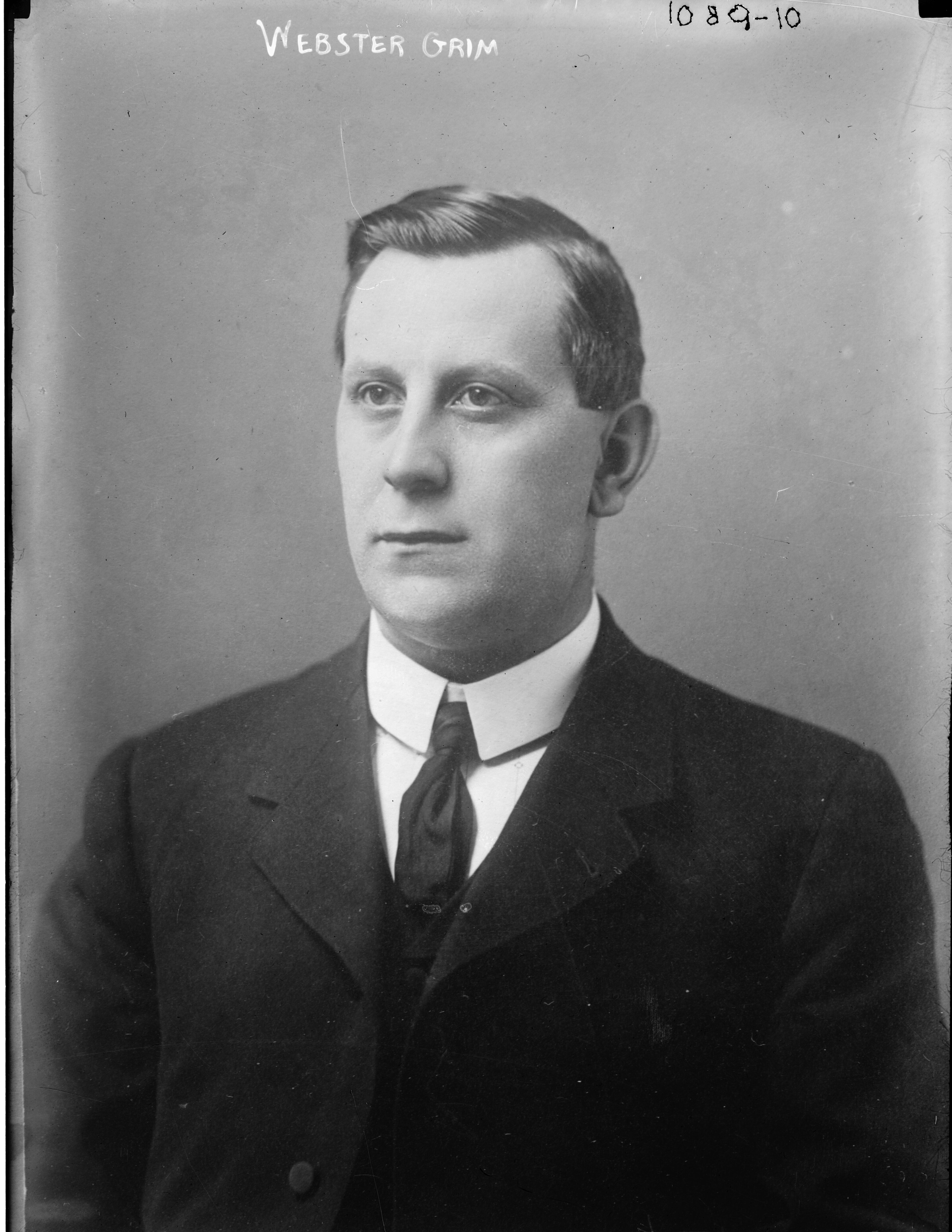

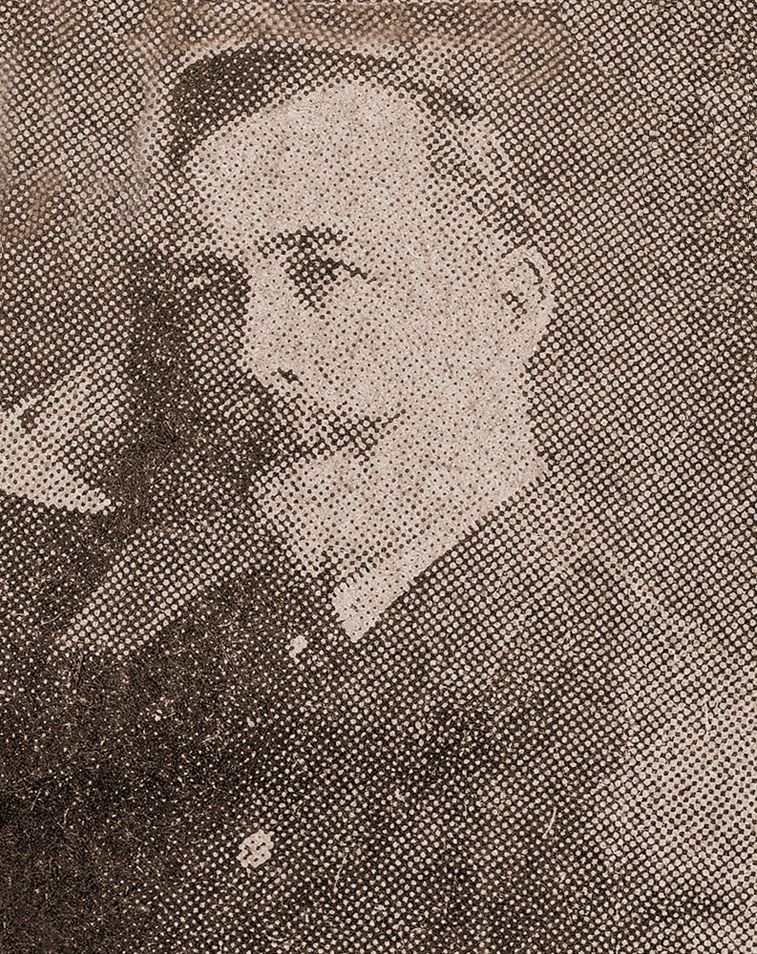
Candidate	John K. Tener	William H. Berry
Party	Republican	Keystone
Popular vote	415,614	382,127
Percentage	41.63%	38.27%
Candidate	Isaac Webster Grim	John W. Slayton
Party	Democratic	Socialist
Popular vote	129,395	53,055
Percentage	12.96%	5.31%
- County results Tener: 30–40% 40–50% 50–60% Berry: 30–40% 40–50% 50–60% Grim: 30–40% 40–50%
Governor before election
Edwin Sydney Stuart
Republican
Elected Governor
John K. Tener
Republican

The 1910 Pennsylvania Gubernatorial election was held on November 8, 1910. The main candidates were Republican John K. Tener, Democrat Webster Grim, Keystone Party leader William H. Berry, and Socialist John W. Slayton.

== General election ==
=== Candidates ===
- George Anton (Industrialist)
- Isaac Webster Grim, State Senator (from Bucks County) (Democratic)
  - running mate: Thomas Greevy, attorney (from Blair County)
- William H. Berry, former Pennsylvania State Treasurer (from Chester County) (Keystone)
  - running mate: Clarence Gibboney, attorney (from Philadelphia County)
- Madison F. Larkin (Prohibition)
- John W. Slayton, union activist (Socialist)
- John K. Tener, U.S. Congressman (from Washington County) (Republican)
  - running mate: John Reynolds (from Lancaster County)

=== Campaign ===
The election was mired in scandal. The main focus was on the Pennsylvania state capitol building, which cost $13 million to build, of which $9 million went for furnishings. Although the state Republican machine remained powerful, its reputation was in shambles, as five insiders were arrested in connection with the capitol cost overruns. Boies Penrose, the U.S. Senator and Republican boss searched for a candidate with high name recognition but little political experience to improve the standing of his organization. Penrose chose Tener, a famous 19th century baseball player who had kept a low profile as a banker until running for Congress in 1909.

Democrats, meanwhile, tried to turn to Berry as their candidate, as they believed he had the perfect reform image due to being the catalyst in uncovering the scandal. Berry was initially opposed by attorney Cyrus Munson, a party boss, but after he withdrew due to health concerns, Penrose attempted to infiltrate the Democratic convention. His move resulted in the nomination of State Senator Grim from Doylestown, and reformers from both parties attempted to rally behind Berry, who ran under the banner of the "Keystone Party". George W. Guthrie unsuccessfully ran for the party's nomination.

Although Penrose viewed Tener as a pawn, he was a viable campaigner in his own right. Tener took much more progressive stances than Penrose had envisioned, supporting education expansion, greater public finance for road construction, and women's suffrage. Tener also ran on his wholesome image as an old time ballplayer in an era when gambling concerns overran the sport. While Tener was unable to gain a majority of the vote, he was able to defeat Berry, as Grim, who had the support of the party machinery, split enough of the progressive vote to lead to a Republican win.

=== Results ===
Pennsylvania gubernatorial election, 1910
Party	Candidate	Votes	%
Republican	John K. Tener	412,658	41.33
Workingmen's	John K. Tener	2,956	0.30
Keystone	William H. Berry	382,127	38.27
Democratic	Webster Grim	129,395	12.96
Socialist	John W. Slayton	53,055	5.31
Prohibition	Madison F. Larkin	17,445	1.75
Industrialist	George Anton	802	0.08
N/A	Other	10	0.00
Total votes		998,448	100.00
