= Senator Hayward (disambiguation) =

Monroe Hayward (1840–1899) was a U.S. Senator-elect from Nebraska who died before he could take office. Senator Hayward may also refer to:

- Elizabeth Pugsley Hayward (1854–1942), Utah State Senate
- William C. Hayward (1847–1917), Iowa State Senate

== See also ==
- Art Haywood (born 1958), Pennsylvania State Senate
