= First Encampment Park =

Public pocket park in Salt Lake City, Utah

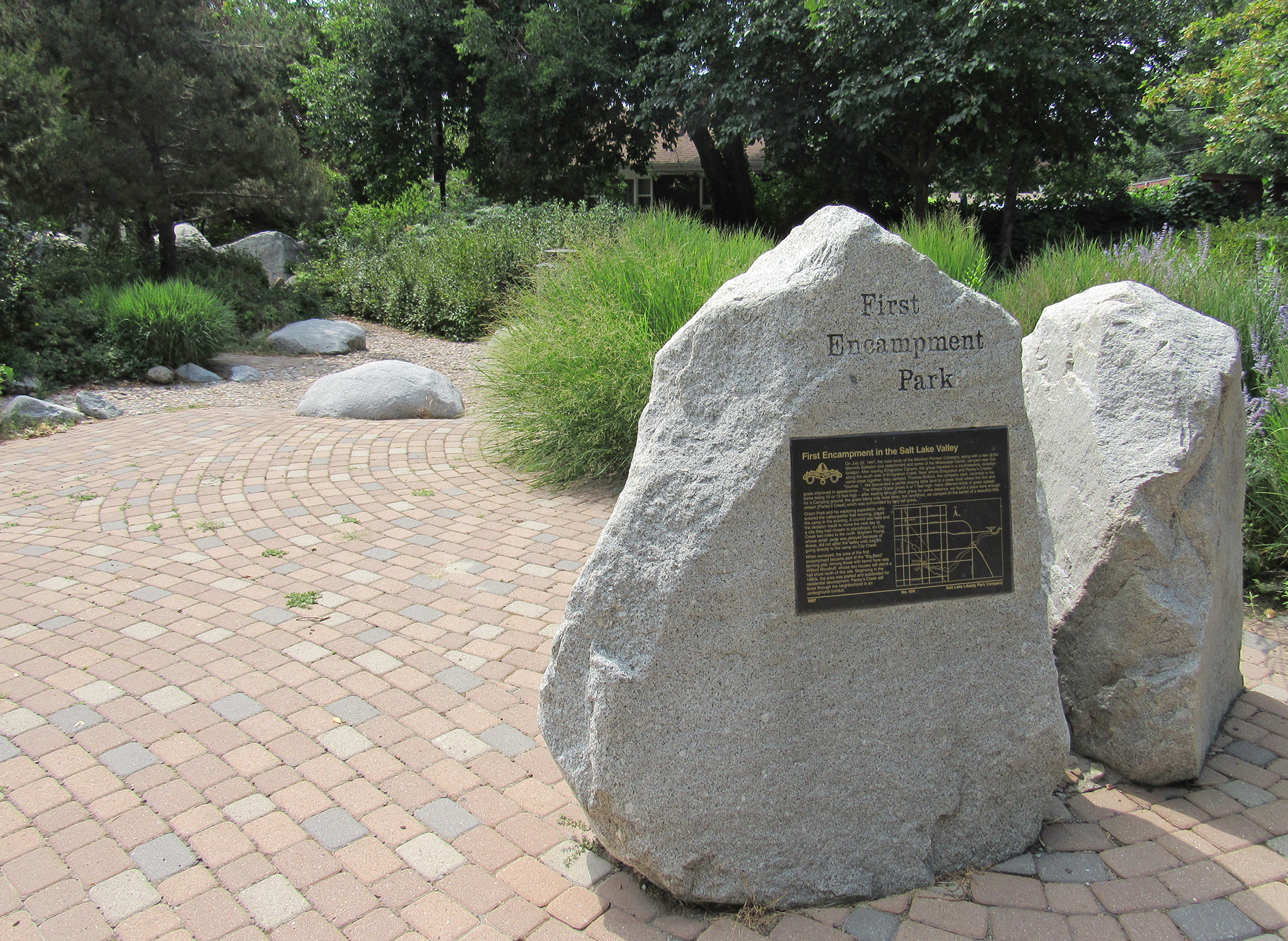
- Stone markers with interpretive plaques within the park
- Interactive map of First Encampment Park
- Location: Salt Lake City, Utah, United States
- Coordinates: 40°44′0.01″N 111°52′37.7″W
- Area: 0.75 acres (0.30 ha)
- Opened: July 22, 1997
- Status: Open year round

First Encampment Park is a public pocket park in the Liberty Wells neighborhood of Salt Lake City, Utah. It is near the location where the initial group of Mormon pioneers spent their first night in what was then Mexico's Salt Lake Valley, on July 22, 1847. Meant to honor this first encampment in the valley, the park was dedicated on July 22, 1997, exactly 150 years after the event. Developed by local congregations of the Church of Jesus Christ of Latter-day Saints (LDS Church), the park was donated to the people of Salt Lake City.

== History and background ==
Early members of the Church of Jesus Christ of Latter-day Saints, commonly called Mormons or Latter-day Saints, were often the victims of anti-Mormon violence in the eastern and midwestern United States. After the killing of their leader Joseph Smith, the Latter-day Saints were forced from their main settlement at Nauvoo, Illinois. Under the leadership of Brigham Young, it was decided to move the church government and membership to the Great Basin, then in Mexican territory, where they hoped to practice their religion without persecution.

This migration occurred during the US western expansion period, when groups of migrants, organized into wagon trains, commonly traveled along newly developed westward trails. The initial group of Latter-day Saints left their temporary settlement of Winter Quarters in April 1847, and as they traveled west, they blazed a new trail, today known as the Mormon Trail. By the time the wagon train neared Emigration Canyon, it had broken into three groups. The first group was a small scouting party led by Orson Pratt, the next was a group containing the majority of the pioneers, and the final group was made up of those who were ill, including church leader Brigham Young.

On July 21, 1847, Orson Pratt and Erastus Snow went ahead of the scouting party, at that time in Emigration Canyon, and first entered Salt Lake Valley. They returned that evening to the scouting group in the canyon, and on July 22, both that party and the main group entered the valley. They followed Emigration Creek southwest near to where it merged with Parley's Creek. Here they set up camp for the night; it is this campsite that is memorialized by the park. The following day they traveled north, to the future site downtown Salt Lake City, setting up camp near 300 South and State Street. Brigham Young and the remainder of the sick group did not enter the valley until July 24, 1847, which is commonly celebrated as Pioneer Day in Utah.

== Development ==
As the sesquicentennial of the arrival of the first Mormon pioneers approached, the church's First Presidency asked that church leaders around the world set aside July 19, 1997 as "Worldwide Pioneer Heritage Service Day" for congregations to provide service to their local communities. As their service project, the Federal Heights LDS Ward decided to create a monument at the approximate location of the first pioneer encampment (as the location had never been marked or otherwise recognized). The project soon expanded to include the Emigration and Wells LDS Stakes and grew into a larger plan to develop a public park that would be donated to the Salt Lake City park system, rather than a simple monument.

Examples of engraved names
on boulders in the park

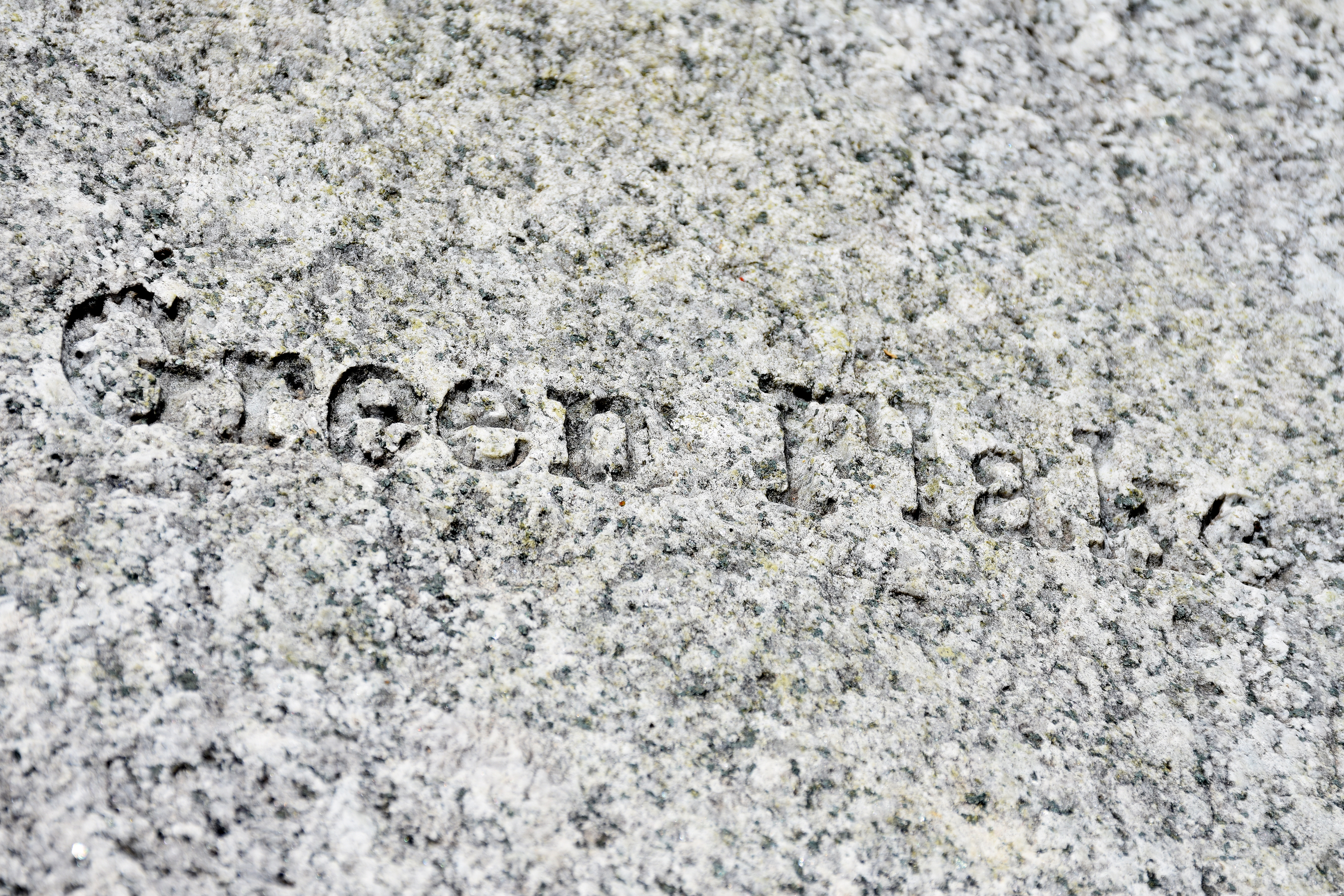
Green Flake, one of three enslaved African-American men among the company

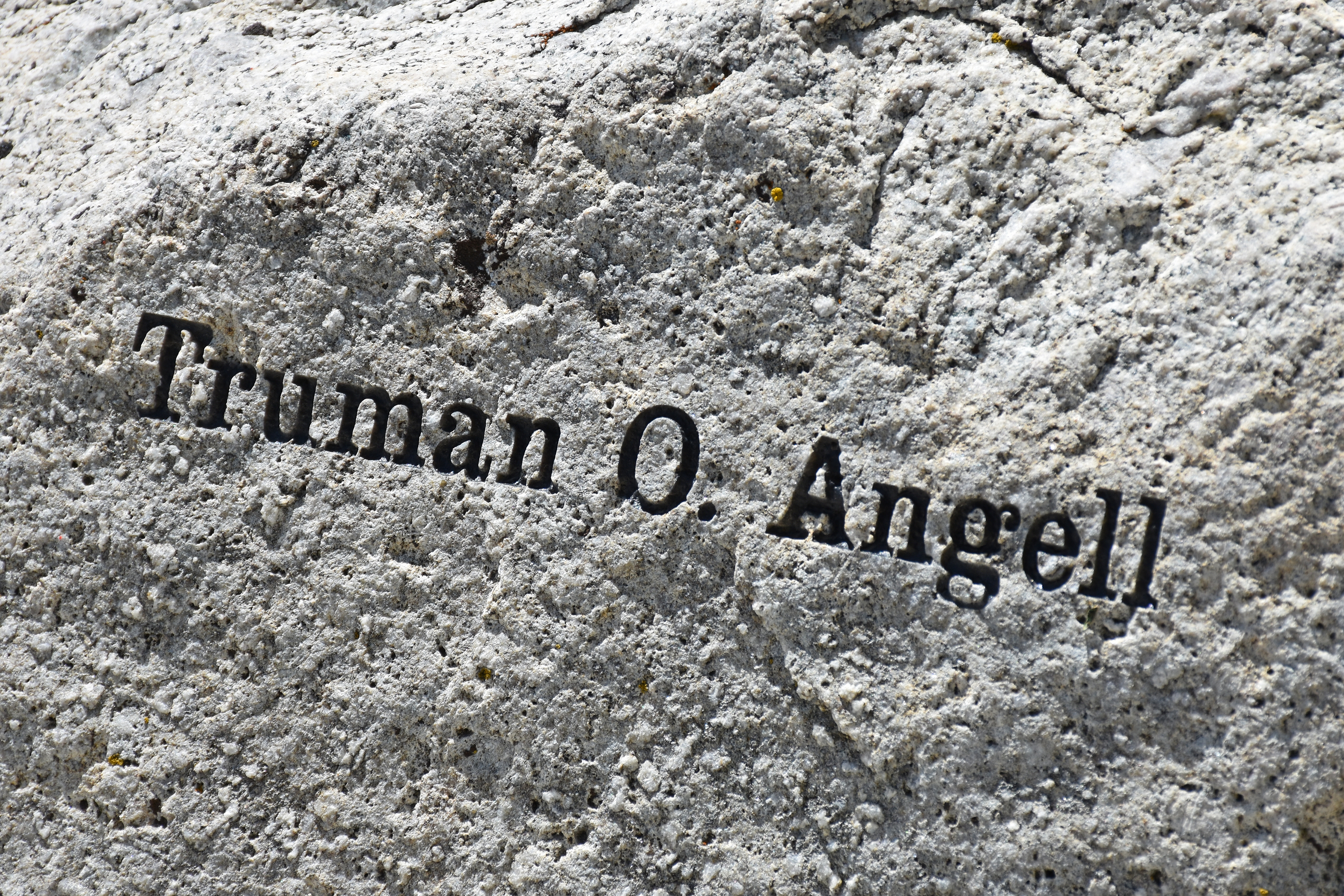
Truman O. Angell, early architect for the church

The location of the first encampment was near the intersection of 1700 South and 500 East in modern-day Salt Lake City. A plot of land at this intersection had long been home to a service/filling station, which had contaminated the soil over the decades. The property owner, Amoco Oil, agreed to donate the property in exchange for the LDS stakes helping with legal costs related to clean up. 4,200 tons of dirt at the site had to be removed and replaced prior to construction of the park.

The park was dedicated by Apostle M. Russell Ballard in a ceremony on July 22, 1997, 150 years after the first encampment. The ceremony also included a ribbon-cutting by a small number of descendants of the original pioneers. Salt Lake City Mayor Deedee Corradini was in attendance to officially accept the park.

== Design ==
The park was designed by landscape architect Stuart Loosli of Salt Lake City. Large boulders were brought in and piled on the east side of the park, to represent the Wasatch Mountains. A path was created leading west from the boulders, meant to represent Emigration Canyon leading out of the mountains and into the valley. Two small streambeds, lined with pebbles, also lead west out of the boulders, representing Emigration Creek and Parley's Creek. The names of the 109 men, three women, and eight children who are believed to have made up the group that camped here in 1847 are engraved on the boulders.

== See also ==
- This Is the Place Heritage Park
- Lone Cedar Tree
- List of historic sites of the Church of Jesus Christ of Latter-day Saints
