= Isaac Webster Grim =

American politician (1866–1947)

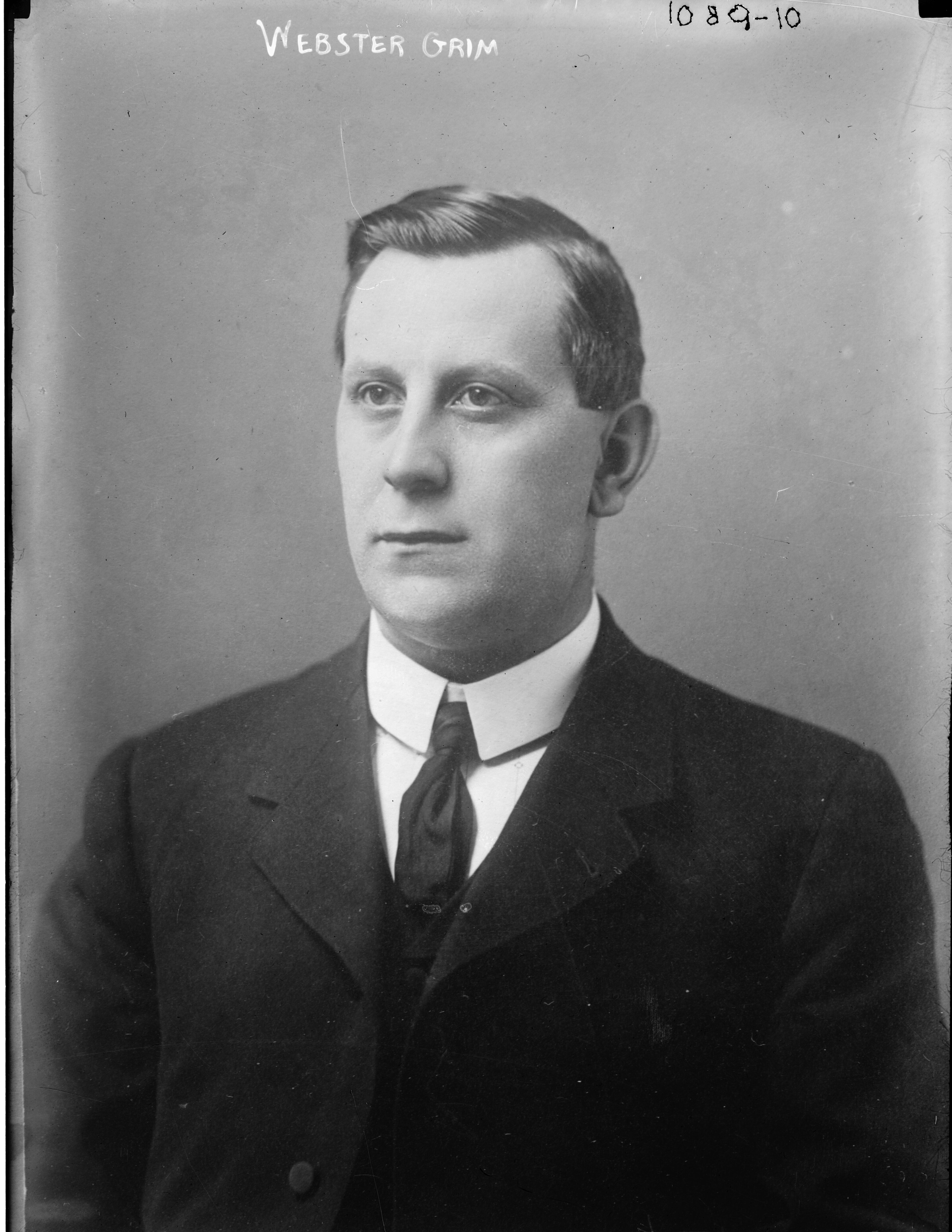
- Photo of Grim

Member of the Pennsylvania Senate from the 10th district
- In office 1903–1910
- Preceded by: Hampton W. Rice
- Succeeded by: Clarence J. Buckman

Doylestown Justice of the peace
- In office 1890–1900

Personal details
- Born: August 11, 1866 Nockamixon Township, Pennsylvania
- Died: June 24, 1947 (aged 81) Philadelphia
- Party: Democratic
- Spouse: Mary Alice née Sassaman
- Children: Ruth Grim Craft, George Webster Grim
- Parent(s): George W. Grim; Elizabeth née Prizer
- Education: Keystone Normal School
- Occupation: Teacher; Lawyer; Judge

Isaac Webster Grim was a politician from Pennsylvania who served as a member of the State Senate from the 10th district for four terms from 1903 to 1910. He also unsuccessfully ran for United States Senate in 1908 and was the Democratic nominee the 1910 gubernatorial election.

== Biography ==
Isaac Webster Grim was born on August 11, 1866, in Revere, Nockamixon Township, Pennsylvania to Doctor George W. Grim and Elizabeth née Prizer. The Grims are of German stock, tracing their ancestry to an Adam Greim who arrived in America on board the Anderson on August 25, 1751.

He received a public school education at the Riegelsville High School before attending the Keystone Normal School and working as a teacher for five years. In 1890 he married Mary Alice née Sassaman. He read law and was admitted to the Bucks County bar in 1899 and was a senior member of the law firm Grim & Grim based out of Doylestown.

He had also led an unsuccessful bid to be elected Bucks County District attorney in 1894, but was successfully elected the Justice of the peace for Doylestown from 1890 to 1900. He was elected to the school board in 1900 and re-elected in 1903 being named its treasurer in 1902.

=== State senate ===
In 1903 he was elected to the State Senate as a member of the Democratic party. He served as the Senate Minority leader from 1903 to 1905 and was chairman of the Democratic caucus. He would unsuccessfully seek the Democratic nomination for Senator in 1908, before winning the nomination for governor in 1910. Boies Penrose, the longtime Republican Senator for Pennsylvanian and political boss had hand picked Grim to oppose John K. Tener, leading to a massive revolt within both parties to stand a third candidate under the Keystone banner, William H. Berry. Grim also led an unsuccessful bid for the Pennsylvania Superior Court in 1913.

=== Later life ===
Grim served as a delegate to the 1920 Democratic National Convention.

== Personal life ==
Isaac Webster Grim had two children; Ruth Grim Craft and George Webster Grim. Grim possessed a natural musical talent and served as the choir master of the Salem Reformed church and served as the superintendent of their school for 12 years. He was a lifelong Presbyterian. Grim was a member of the Knights of the Golden Eagle serving as clerk of the exchequer of St. Tammany Castle, No. 173 before being named grand chief in 1905. He was also a member of the Independent Order of Odd Fellows Aquetong Lodge, No. 193 and Lenape Council, No. 1117.

Grim died on July 24, 1947 in Philadelphia at the age of 80 and is buried in the Nockamixon Union Cemetery.
