= Elizabeth Hayward =

Elizabeth Hayward may refer to:

- Elizabeth Pugsley Hayward (1854–1942), member of the Utah House of Representatives and Utah State Senate
- Elizabeth Steiner Hayward (born 1963), member of the Oregon Senate
