= Kate B. Carter =

American historian

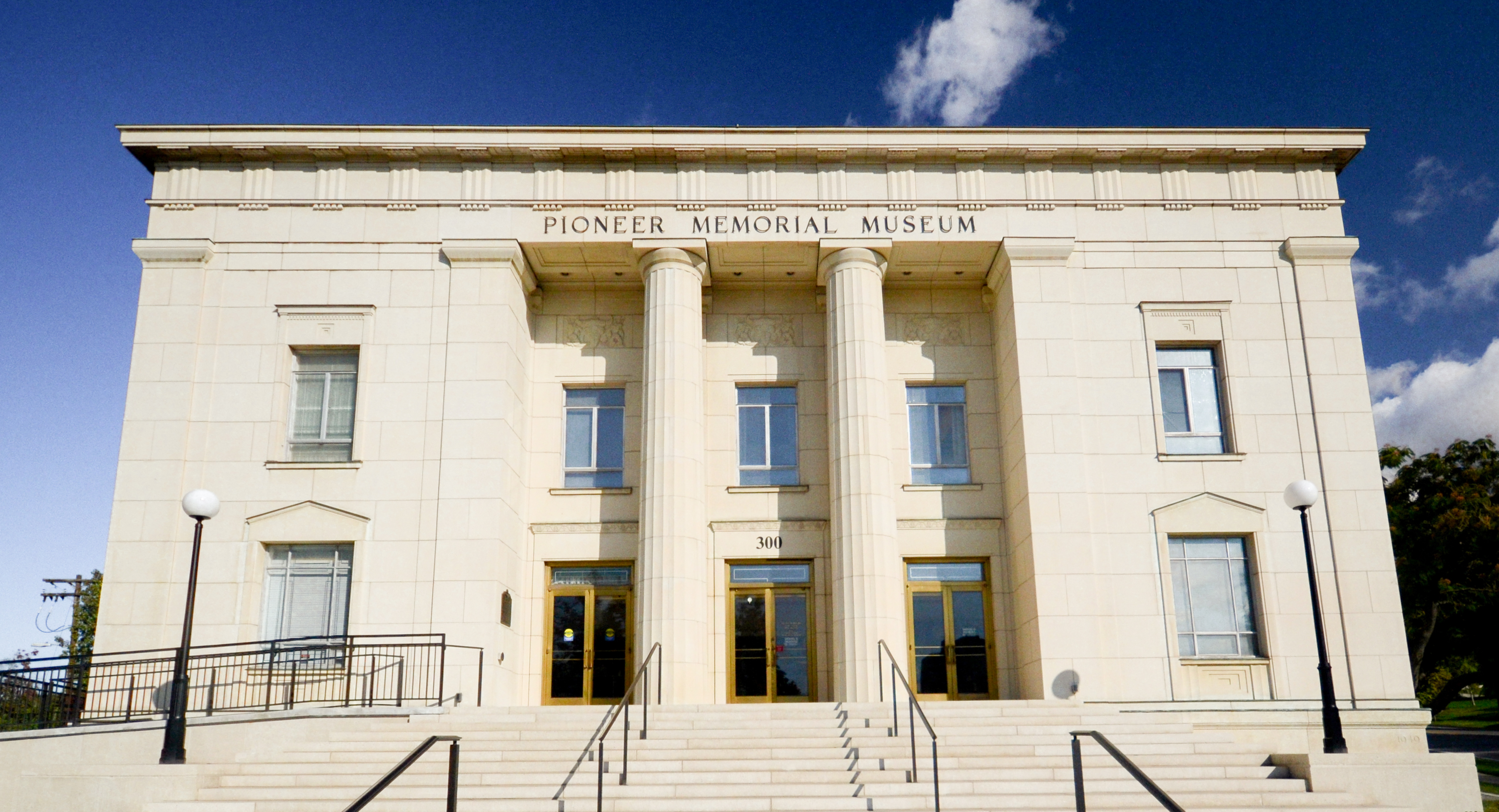
Pioneer Memorial Museum & DUP headquarters, Salt Lake City, Utah

Kate B. Carter (July 30, 1891 – September 8, 1976) was an editor, historian and long-time president of Daughters of Utah Pioneers.

== Biography ==
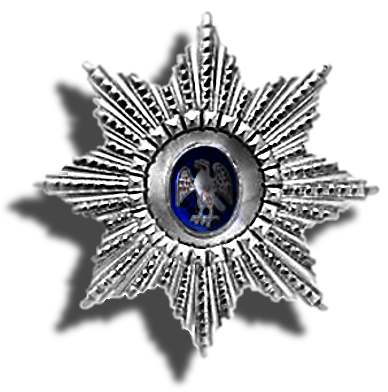
A commander's star, Order of the Falcon, Iceland

Carter was born Catherine Vigdis Bearnson in Spanish Fork, Utah, in 1891. Her father, Finnbogi Bearnson, was from Iceland and her mother, Mary Jenson Bearnson, was from Denmark. Carter reflected later in life that her father told her Viking-age sagas when she sat on his knee as a child. She also grew up next to two formerly enslaved Black Mormon pioneers, Alexander and Marinda Redd Bankhead, as a child in Spanish Fork.

Kate Carter married Austin Carter in 1917 in the Salt Lake Temple of the Church of Jesus Christ of Latter-Day Saints. They had three children.

== History Career ==
Carter was a charter member of the Spanish Fork Daughters of Utah Pioneers before she moved to Salt Lake in 1926 and became a member of the Daughters of Utah Pioneers there.

In 1930, Carter was asked to prepare lessons for DUP meetings. This assignment began a four-decade-long career as a compiler and author of pioneer histories. Her writings were published in the twenty-volume collection, Our Pioneer Heritage, the twelve-volume collection Heart Throbs of the West, and six volumes of Treasures of Pioneer History. Carter dedicated the proceeds from her books to finance the Pioneer Memorial Museum in Salt Lake City, Utah. Her work as a historian is notable for her attention to the details of everyday pioneer life, often featuring cultural aspects of Utah history previous not looked at, including pioneer holidays, food, humor, culture, and children.

Carter was President of Daughters of Utah Pioneers from April 1941 until her death in September 1976, serving the longest of any of its presidents. She served as President of the Days of '47 Parade from its start in 1947 until her death.

Carter was recognized for her work with a number of awards, including the Order of the Falcon, an honor from the government of Iceland (Stórriddarakross, May 18, 1955), the Mary Margaret McBride Award (1953), the Utah Women's Hall of Fame Award, and an honorary degree from Southern Utah State College.

== List of compiled works ==
- Collection of 45 Lessons, Historical Pamphlets (1940)
- Mormondom's First Woman Missionary. Louisa Barnes Pratt. Life Story and Travels Told in Her Own Words (194-?)
- Heart Throbs of the West, Volumes 1–12 (1947-1951)
- Treasures of Pioneer History, Volumes 1–6 (1952–1957)
- Eliza R. Snow, Leader of Pioneer Women (1956, with Bryant S. Hinckley and Nicholas G. Morgan)
- Our Pioneer Heritage, Volumes 1–20 (1958–1977)
- An Enduring Legacy Volumes 1– (1978–

== List of compiled lessons and pamphlets ==
- The Value of Writing and Preserving Pioneer History (1936)
- Pioneer Recipes (1937)
- The Other Mother (1937)
- Women of the Mormon Battalion and Mississippi Saints (1938)
- Four Outstanding Activities of the Pioneers: Historical Pamphlet (1939)
- Graves Along the Trail (1939)
- Bands and Orchestras of Early Days (1941)
- Merchandising in Deseret (1941)
- Ships and Boats of Pioneer Interest (1942)
- First Hotels, Laundries and Dairies in the West (1943)
- Journal of John T. Caine (1943, reprint, 2010)
- Governors of Utah (1944)
- Indian Wars in Deseret (1944)
- Non-Mormon Religious Denominations in Utah (1945)
- Rugged Men of the West (1945)
- The Mormons in Wyoming and Idaho (1946)
- They Came in '47 (1947)
- Journal of George Cannon Lambert (1948)
- Trails and Pioneer Freighters Who Followed Them (1948)
- Western Folklore (1948)
- Horticulture in the West (1949)
- The Welsh in Utah (1949)
- Exploration in the Rocky Mountain West (1951)
- Ranching in the Early Days (1951)
- Stories to Tell at Xmas Time (1951)
- The Western Cowboy (1951)
- Dancing, A Pioneer Recreation (1952)
- Riders of the Pony Express (1952)
- The Mormons in Oregon and Montana (1952)
- Pioneer Memorial Museum, Salt Lake City, Utah (1954)
- Indian Tribes and Their Dealings with the Mormons (1955)
- Pioneer Irrigation: Upper Snake River Valley (1955)
- Stories of the Mormon Battalion (1955)
- The Mormons in Hawaii (1955)
- The Handcart Pioneers (1956)
- The Mormon Battalion, 1846 & 7 (1956)
- Utah During Civil War Years (1956)
- The Chase Mill: 1852, Liberty Park (1957)
- The Story of Utah Canyons (1957)
- And They Were Healed (1958)
- Diary of Isaiah Moses Coombs (1958)
- Brigham Young: His Wives and Family (1960)
- The Mormons—Their Westward Trek (1960)
- The Ship Brooklyn Saints (1960)
- Utah and the Pony Express (1960)
- Excerpts from the Diary of William F. Rigby (1961)
- Pioneer City Ordinances (1961)
- The Story of Telegraphy (1961)
- Utah's Three Governments (1961)
- The Mormons in St. Louis (1962)
- The Salt Lake Theater (1962)
- The Salmon River Mission (1963)
- They Came in 1863 (1963)
- A Relic Tells Its Story (1964)
- The Indian and the Pioneer (1964)
- Markers That Tell the Story of the Utah Pioneers (1965)
- The Golden Spike (1965)
- The Story of the Negro Pioneer (1965)
- Eleven Autobiographies (1966)
- James Ririe — Archibald McFarland (1966)
- Pioneer Cattle (1966)
- Stories of Yesteryear (1966)
- They Came in 1866 (1966)
- Heber C. Kimball: His Wives and Family (1967)
- Landmarks Saved By the Daughters of Utah Pioneers (1967)
- The Early Chinese of Western United States (1967)
- The Great Mormon Tabernacle (1967)
- The Journal of Joseph Smith Black (1967)
- The Relief Society of The Church of Jesus Christ of Latter-day Saints (1967)
- The Government of the U.S. vs. Utah Territory, 1880-1896 (1968)
- Three Important Manuscripts (1968)
- Denominations That Base Their Beliefs on the Teachings of Joseph Smith the Mormon Prophet (1969)
- First Transcontinental Railroad in Picture and Story (1969)
- Pioneer Irrigation in Upper Snake River Valley (1969)
- Pioneers in Picture and Story (1969)
- The Year 1869 (1969)
- The Young Women's Mutual Improvement Association (1969)
- William Wood, Pioneer, 1862 (1969)
- Nine Autobiographies (1970)
- The Mormons From Scotland and Wales (1970)
- The Year of 1870 (1970)
- Pioneer Love Stories (1971)
- The Year 1871 (1971)
- Early Hotels (1972)
- Goodridge—Goodrich Family Story (1972)
- Pioneer Choirs and Their Leaders (1972)
- Recollections of Pioneer Days (1972)
- The Year 1872 (1972)
- Woolen and Cotton Mills (1972)
- The Old Fort (1973)
- That They May Be Remembered (1974)
- The Mormons: Their Westward Trek (1974)
- Unique Story: President Brigham Young (1975)
- The Pioneer Cookbook (1978)
- Pioneer Quilts (1979)
- Two Important Journals (Reprint, 1981)
- The Year 1882 (Reprint, 1982)
- Felt Journal (Reprint, 1984)
- Immigrant Pioneer Women (Reprint, 1985)
- Native Pioneers (Reprint, 1985)
- The Year 1885 (Reprint, 1985)
- Levi Jackman—Lyman Curtis (Reprint, 1986)
- The Year 1886 (Reprint, 1986)
- The Year 1887 (Reprint, 1987)
- Wildlife of Utah Territory (Reprint, 1987)
- Brigham Young: His Wives and Family (Reprint, 1990)
- Pioneer and Old Dolls (Reprint, 1990)
- Indian Chiefs of Pioneer Days (Reprint, 2010)
