= Daughters of Utah Pioneers =

Lineage society

- International Society Daughters of Utah Pioneers

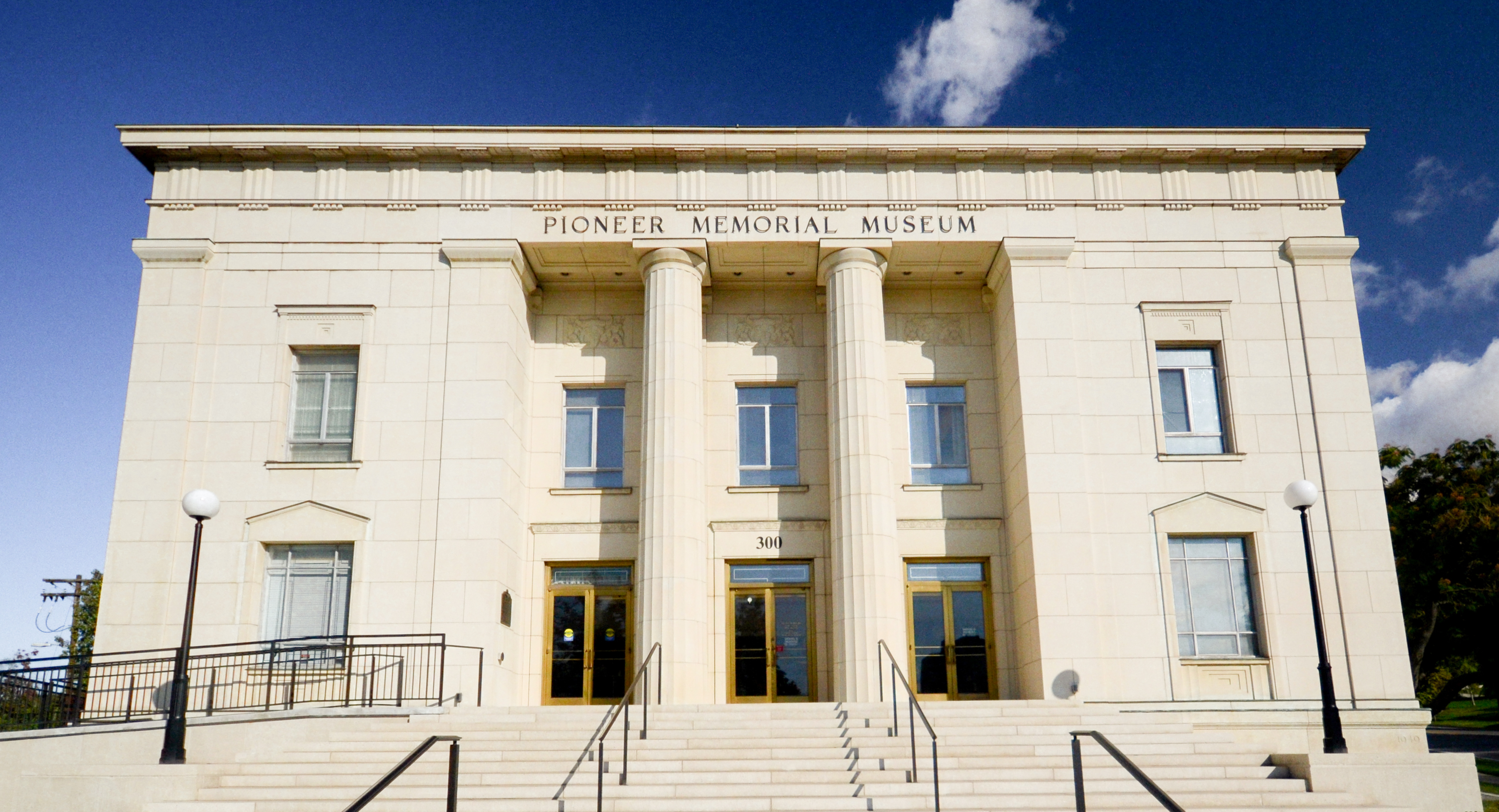
- Pioneer Memorial Museum, the society's headquarters in Salt Lake City
- Abbreviation: DUP or ISDUP
- Founded: April 11, 1901
- Founder: Annie Taylor Hyde
- Founded at: Salt Lake City, Utah, U.S.
- Type: Non-profit, lineage society
- Purpose: Historic preservation and education
- Headquarters: Pioneer Memorial Museum; 300 N Main Street; Salt Lake City, Utah, U.S.
- Members: 21,451
- President: Ellen Jeppson
- Website: isdup.org

The International Society Daughters of Utah Pioneers (often abbreviated as DUP or ISDUP) is a women's lineage-based organization dedicated to preserving the history of the settlers of the geographic area covered by the State of Deseret and Utah Territory, including Latter-Day Saint settlers (also known as Mormon pioneers).

Membership in the DUP is restricted to direct descendants of these settlers of Utah from the years 1847 to 1869 who are women over 18 years of age. The activities of the organization, including erecting monuments, publishing Utah history books, and managing 86 museums containing pioneer artifacts, have contributed significantly to Utah historical commemoration and Mormon cultural memory in the intermountain west. There are 21,451 active members as of 2026.

== History ==
The Daughters of Utah Pioneers was organized April 11, 1901 in Salt Lake City. Annie Taylor Hyde, a daughter of John Taylor, president of the Church of Jesus Christ of Latter-day Saints, invited a group of fifty-four women to her home seeking to "perpetuate the names and achievements of the men, women and children who were the pioneers in founding this commonwealth."

The women who chartered the DUP followed the lead of other national lineage societies emerging during this period, such as the Daughters of the American Revolution (DAR), which formed in 1890 and also acted as a nonpolitical heritage organization invested in patriotism and education. The DAR, however, banned Mormon women from polygamist families until 1910.

In 1925, the now International Society Daughters of Utah Pioneers (ISDUP) and its local units were legally incorporated with the state of Utah.

Kate B. Carter was President of Daughters of Utah Pioneers from April 1941 until her death in September 1976, serving the longest of any of its presidents. She served as President of the Days of '47 Parade from its start in 1947 until her death, edited the DUP's pioneer history publication series, and played a critical role in securing funding for the Pioneer Memorial Museum's construction in 1950.

== Impact on Utah History ==
In later decades, the ISDUP (DUP) has worked to conserve historical sites and landmarks, to collect artifacts, relics, manuscripts, photographs, and to educate its members and the general public.

=== Publications & Histories ===
Numerous books have been published by the society, including community and family histories, cookbooks, song books, children's stories, and a four-volume collection of biographical sketches Pioneer Women of Faith and Fortitude (1998). Beginning in 1930, DUP member Kate B. Carter started compiling other Daughters' family histories into thematic pamphlets called lessons. These lessons were presented at smaller company meetings and used as a way to focus and guide DUP meeting conversations. Beginning in 1940, the lessons were published in bound volumes. The first series of volumes was titled Heart Throbs of the West, a twelve volume collection. Others, such as Our Pioneer Heritage and Treasures of Pioneer History were similarly compiled with Kate Carter listed as the author despite being the primary editor and compiler.

=== Historic Markers ===
Beginning in 1933 with the Lone Cedar monument, the DUP started erecting markers at sites of Utah history. This markers program includes a standardized plaque with the DUP's iconic yolk-and-beehive insignia and short paragraph explaining what happened at that site. The first numbered DUP marker is in Tooele, commemorating the pioneers of Tooele county who arrived September 2, 1849. There are an estimated 600 DUP markers in total, mostly in the intermountain west but also in thirteen different states and abroad in eleven countries.

=== Relic Halls ===
The society maintains satellite museums in the intermountain west, eighty-six of them in Utah, and manages an extensive collection in its six-floor museum in downtown Salt Lake City. Sometimes these DUP museums are called "relic halls," in reference to the nineteenth-century custom of historic "relic keeping." The DUP customs around relic keeping and exhibition displays differ significantly from other museums in the state of Utah. Historic pioneer artifacts cannot be removed from a DUP building once they enter, and must made available for the pioneer descendants and family to come visit. Sometimes these historic displays of massive quantities of pioneer heirlooms are regarded as strange, eclectic, or quirky by visitors. The DUP's central relic hall and headquarters, the Pioneer Memorial Museum, received the "World's Largest Collection Of Artifacts On A Single Subject" award from the World Record Academy in May 2024.

== Organizational structure ==
DUP membership is open to any woman who is: (1) A direct-line descendant or legally adopted direct-line descendant with a pioneer ancestor; (2) the pioneer ancestor is a person who traveled to or through the geographic area covered by the State of Deseret/Utah Territory between July 1847 and 10 May 1869 (completion of the railroad, May 10, 1869); (3) over the age of eighteen, and of good character. Travel through the geographic area covered by the State of Deseret/Utah Territory can be either east to west, west to east, north to south, or south to north.

ISDUP headquarters are located in the Pioneer Memorial Museum in Salt Lake City, Utah. The international organization is administered by a board. Membership is organized into "companies," whose presiding officers oversee the activities of "camps" of ten or more members in a geographic area.

In 2006, the ISDUP consisted of 185 companies overseeing 1,050 camps in the United States and Canada with a total living membership of 21,451.

== Notable members ==
- Annie Wells Cannon, suffragist
- Zina Young Card, religious leader and suffragist
- Kate B. Carter, editor and historian
- Maria Young Dougall, suffragist
- Hilda Anderson Erickson, pioneer and frontierswoman
- Susa Young Gates, writer and suffragist
- Elizabeth Pugsley Hayward, Democratic politician
- Annie Taylor Hyde, Latter-Day Saint leader
- Alice Merrill Horne, artist and politician
- Georgina G. Marriott, educator and clubwoman
- Susan Evans McCloud, novelist, poet, and songwriter
- Katie Ann Powell, Miss District of Columbia 2024

== See also ==
- List of Mormon family organizations
- Mormon pioneers
- Sons of Utah Pioneers
- List of Sons and Daughters of Utah Pioneers historic monuments
