= Katie Ann Powell =

American beauty pageant titleholder

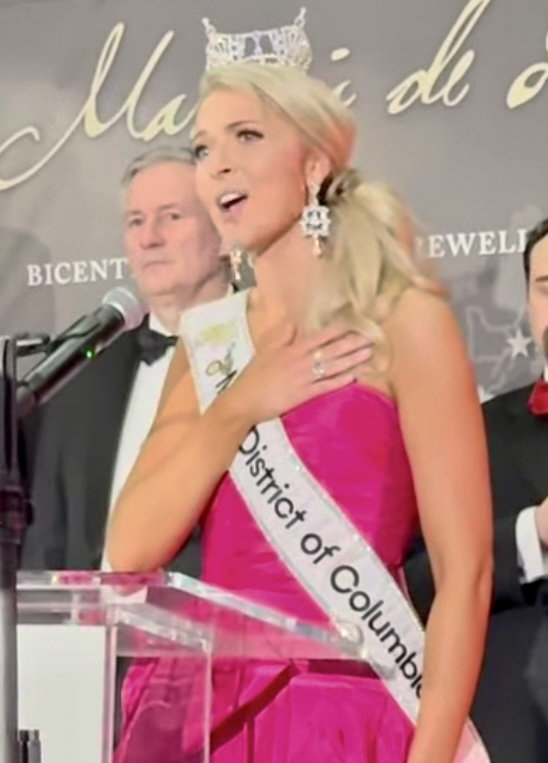
- Powell in 2025
- Education: Brigham Young University; University of Redlands; University of Utah
- Occupations: financial analyst harpist podcaster
- Term: 2024–2025
- Predecessor: Jude Maboné
- Successor: Katie Wadman
- Beauty pageant titleholder
- Title: Miss Sandy Utah 2016; Queen of Days of '47 2023; Miss District of Columbia 2024
- Hair color: Blonde
- Eye color: Blue
- Major competitions: Miss Utah 2021 (first runner–up); Miss District of Columbia 2024 (won); Miss America 2025 (congeniality)
- Website: Official Website

Katie Ann Powell is an American beauty pageant titleholder, harpist, podcaster, and financial analyst. She won the Miss District of Columbia pageant in 2024 and competed at the Miss America 2025 pageant, winning the congeniality award. She serves as the executive director of the Granite Credit Union Foundation and hosts the Full Confidence Ahead podcast.

== Early life and education ==
Powell was born on a military base and grew up in Sandy, Utah. She is the daughter of Douglas Lester Powell, a veteran of the United States Air Force, and Stephanie Joy Powell. As a child, she was diagnosed with methicillin-resistant Staphylococcus aureus in the bone and underwent surgery to treat it.

She attended Hillcrest High School and graduated with a bachelor of arts degree in communications from Brigham Young University, where she was a member of Phi Lambda Beta Honor Society. While in undergraduate school, she was a student journalist and news anchor for BYU Universe Live News. She also studied harp performance at the University of Utah and the University of Redlands Conservatory of Music. She worked on a master of business administration degree at the University of Utah.

== Career and pageants ==
Powell is a harpist and competed in pageants with harp playing as her talent.

She was crowned Miss Sandy 2016. Powell competed in the Miss Utah pageant in 2021 and placed as 1st-runner up.

On March 24, 2023, Powell was crowned Queen of Days of '47 during a scholarship competition at the Pioneer Memorial Museum organized by Days of 47 Inc. and the International Society Daughters of Utah Pioneers.

She won the Miss District of Columbia pageant in 2024. On February 15, 2025, she sang "The Star-Spangled Banner" at the 2025 Sweethearts and Patriots Gala, hosted by the District of Columbia Society of the Sons of the American Revolution at the French Embassy in the United States to raise money for the National Military Family Association and Le Comite de l’Entraide Defense.

On January 5, 2025, she competed in the Miss America 2025 pageant, playing Baroque Flamenco on the harp and promoting her community service initiative called "Preparing Women for Financial Success." She won the congeniality title "most inspirational".

Powell works as a financial advisor. She is the executive director of the Granite Credit Union Foundation and the founder and host of the Full Confidence Ahead podcast.

== Personal life ==
Powell is a member of the Daughters of Utah Pioneers and the Daughters of the American Revolution. She is fluent in Portuguese and served as a Latter-Day Saint missionary in Portugal.

Awards and achievements
Preceded by Jude Maboné	(Washington, D.C.) Miss District of Columbia; 2024	Succeeded by Katie Wadman
