= 1908 Democratic National Convention =

U.S. political event held in Denver, Colorado

- 1908 presidential election
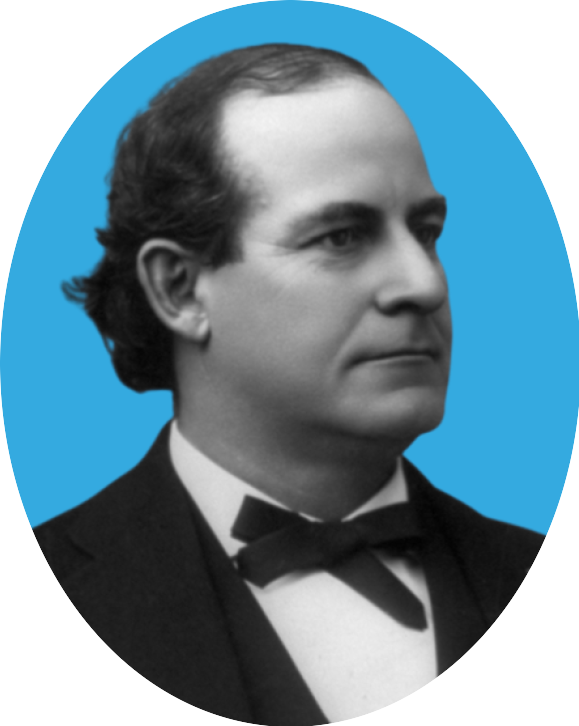
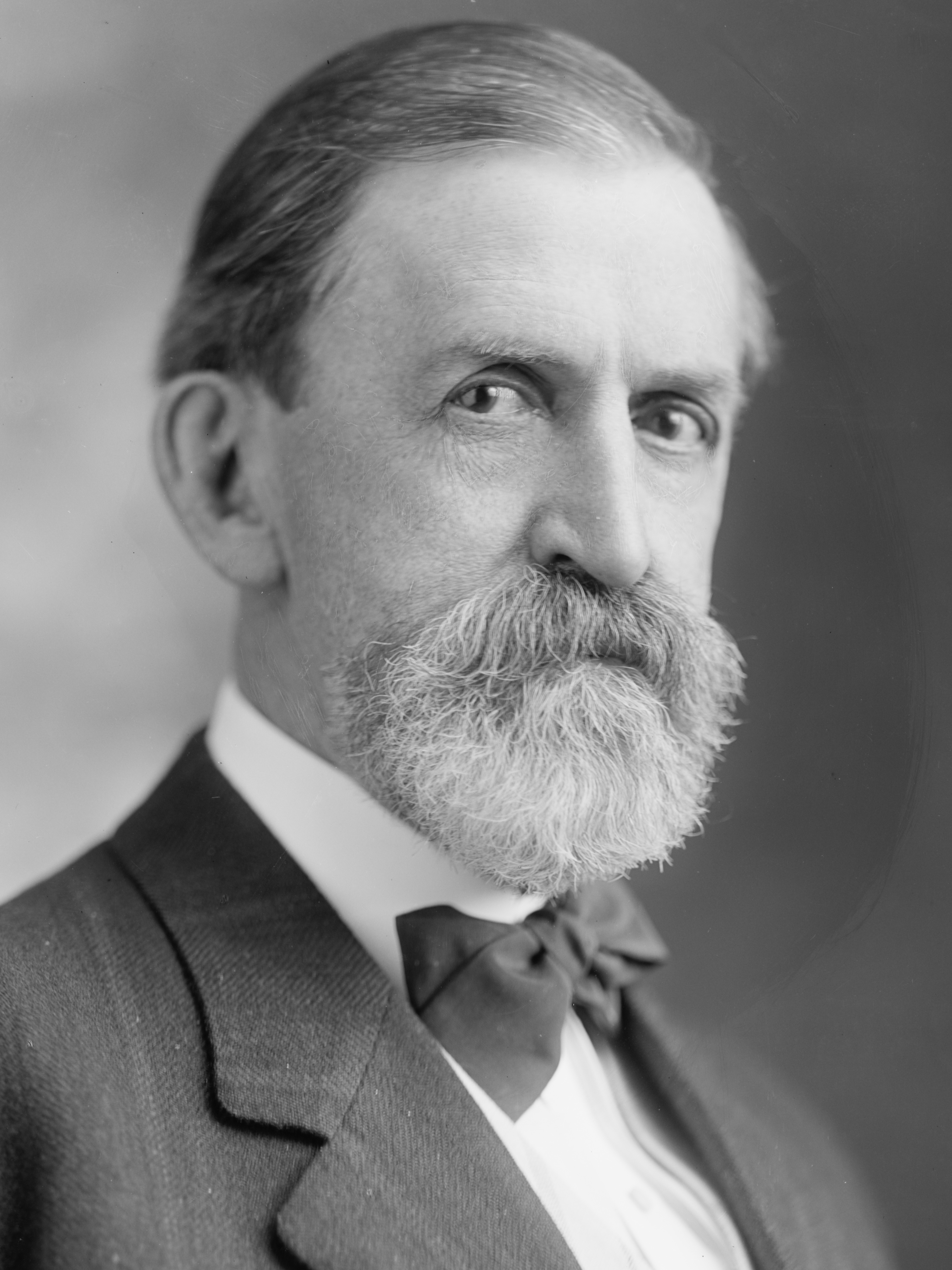
- Nominees; Bryan and Kern

Convention
- Dates: July 7–10, 1908
- City: Denver, Colorado
- Venue: Denver Auditorium Arena

Candidates
- Presidential nominee: William J. Bryan of Nebraska
- Vice-presidential nominee: John W. Kern of Indiana

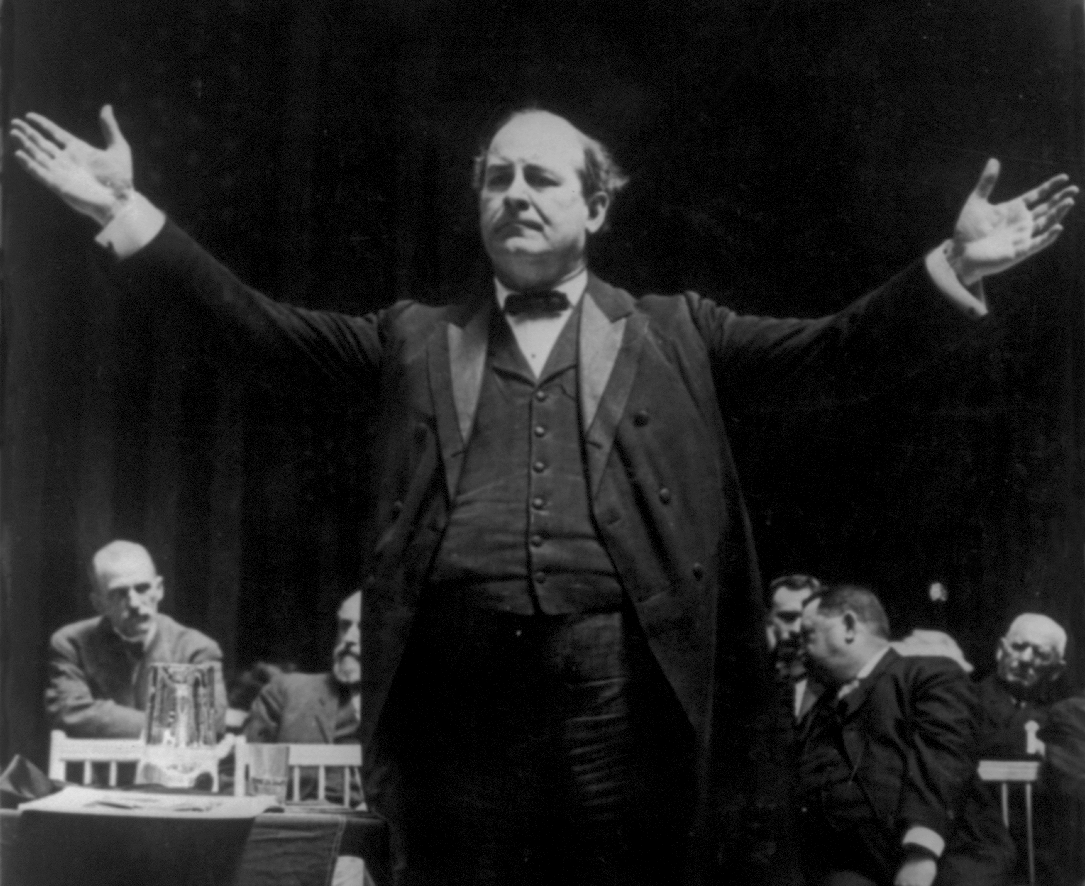
Bryan addresses the convention

The 1908 Democratic National Convention took place from July 7 to July 10, 1908, at Denver Auditorium Arena in Denver, Colorado.

The event is widely considered a significant part of Denver's political and social history.

== The convention ==
The 1908 convention was the first convention of a major political party in a Western state. The city did not host another nominating convention until a century later, at the 2008 Democratic National Convention.

The convention was the second Democratic National Convention to include female delegates. They were Mary C. C. Bradford (Colorado) and Elizabeth Pugsley Hayward (Mrs. Henry J. Hayward) (Utah). Alternate delegates were Mrs. Charles Cook (Colorado), Harriet G. Hood (Wyoming), and Sara L. Ventress (Utah).

== Presidential nomination ==
=== Presidential candidates ===
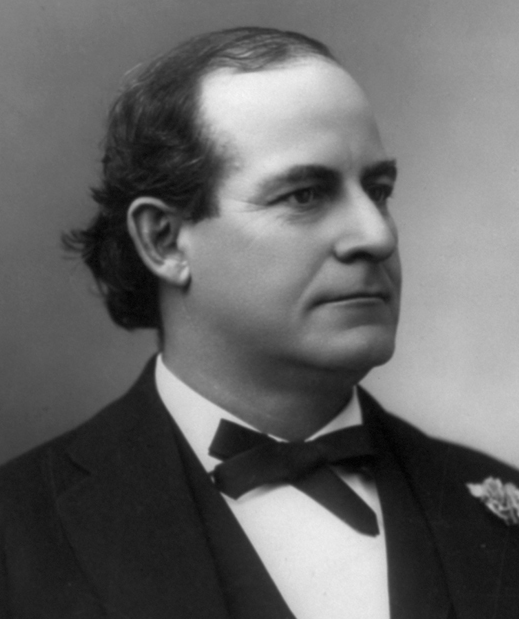
Former Representative William Jennings Bryan
of Nebraska

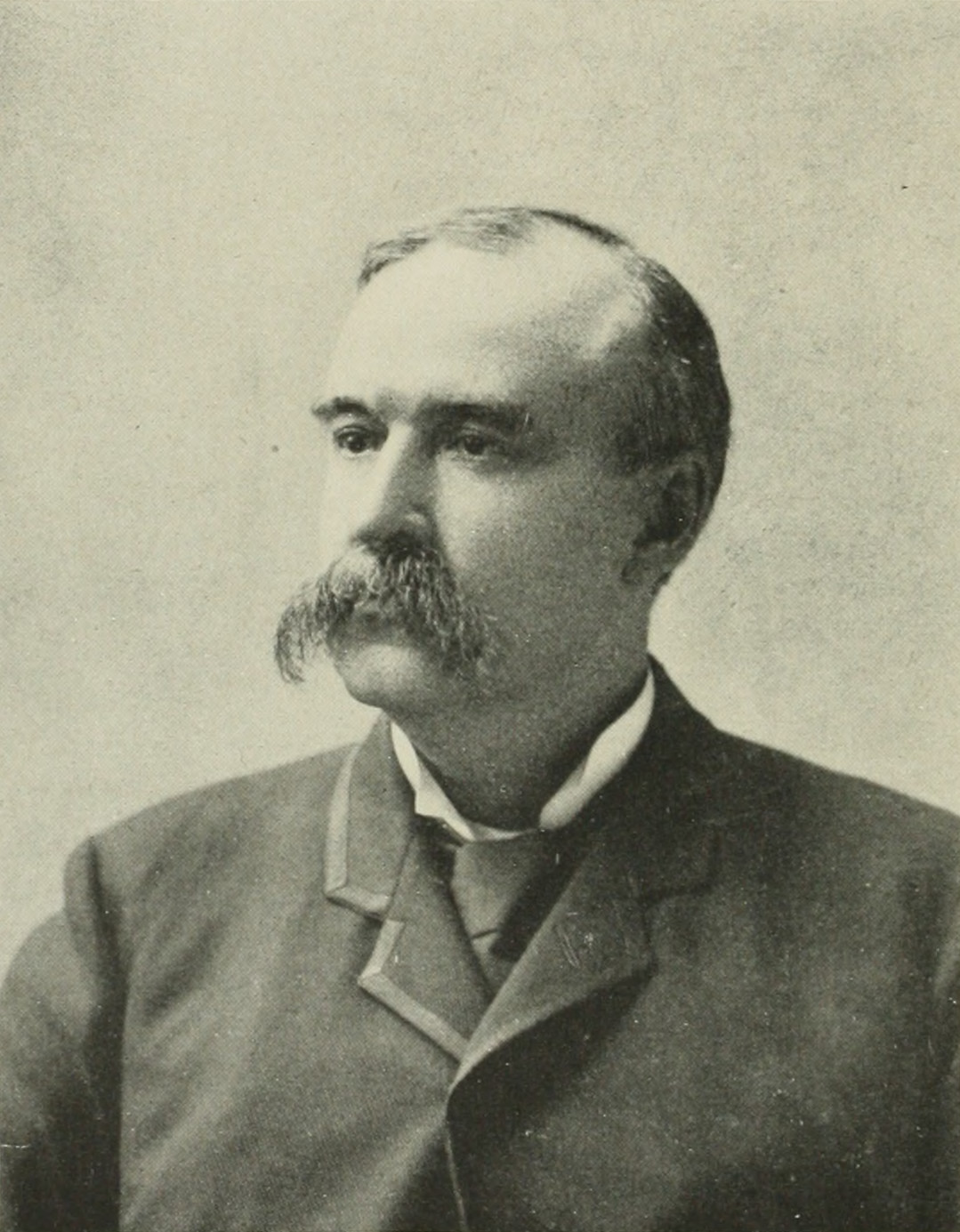
Judge
George Gray
of Delaware

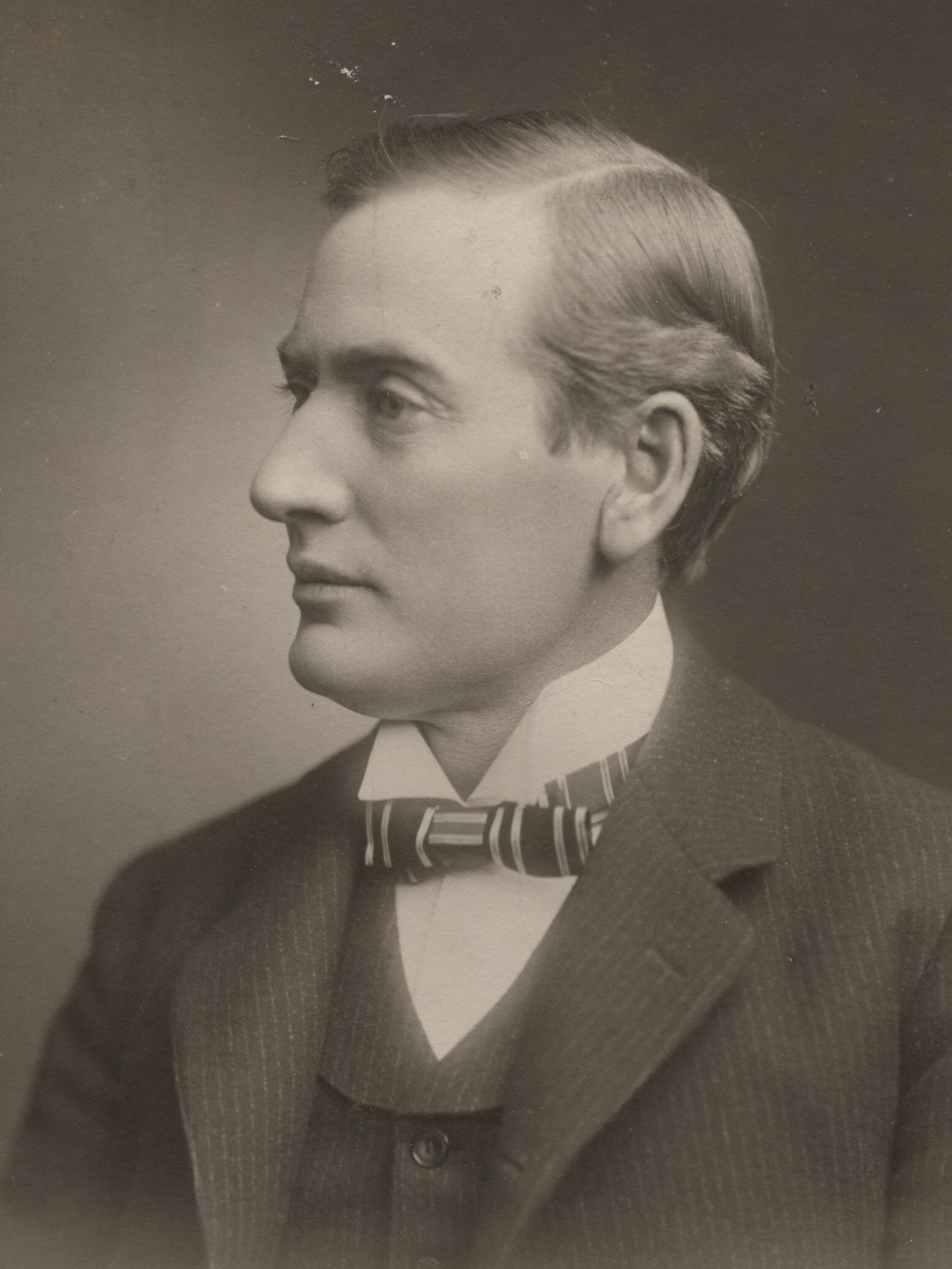
Governor
John A. Johnson
of Minnesota

=== Not nominated ===
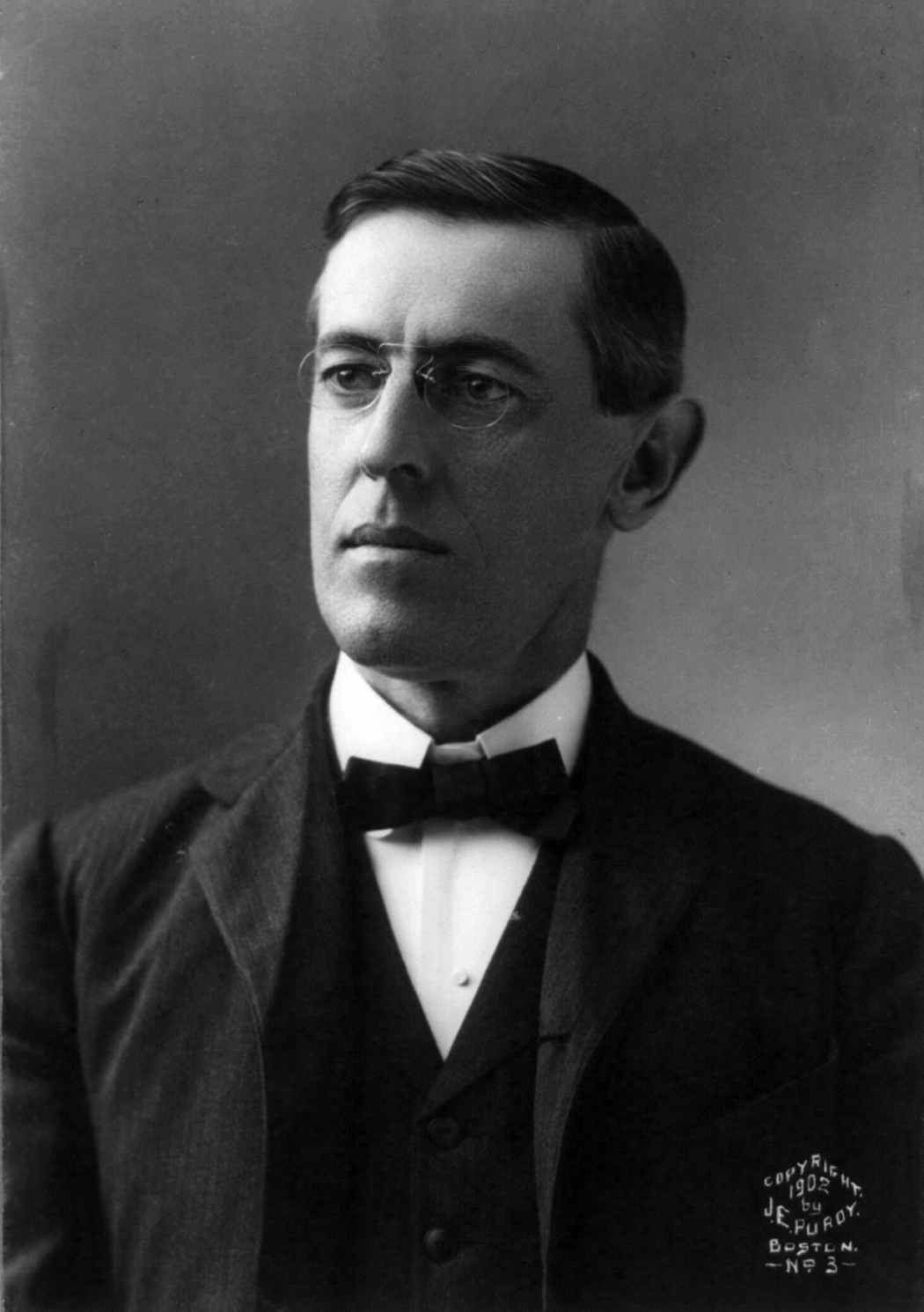
University President Woodrow Wilson
of New Jersey

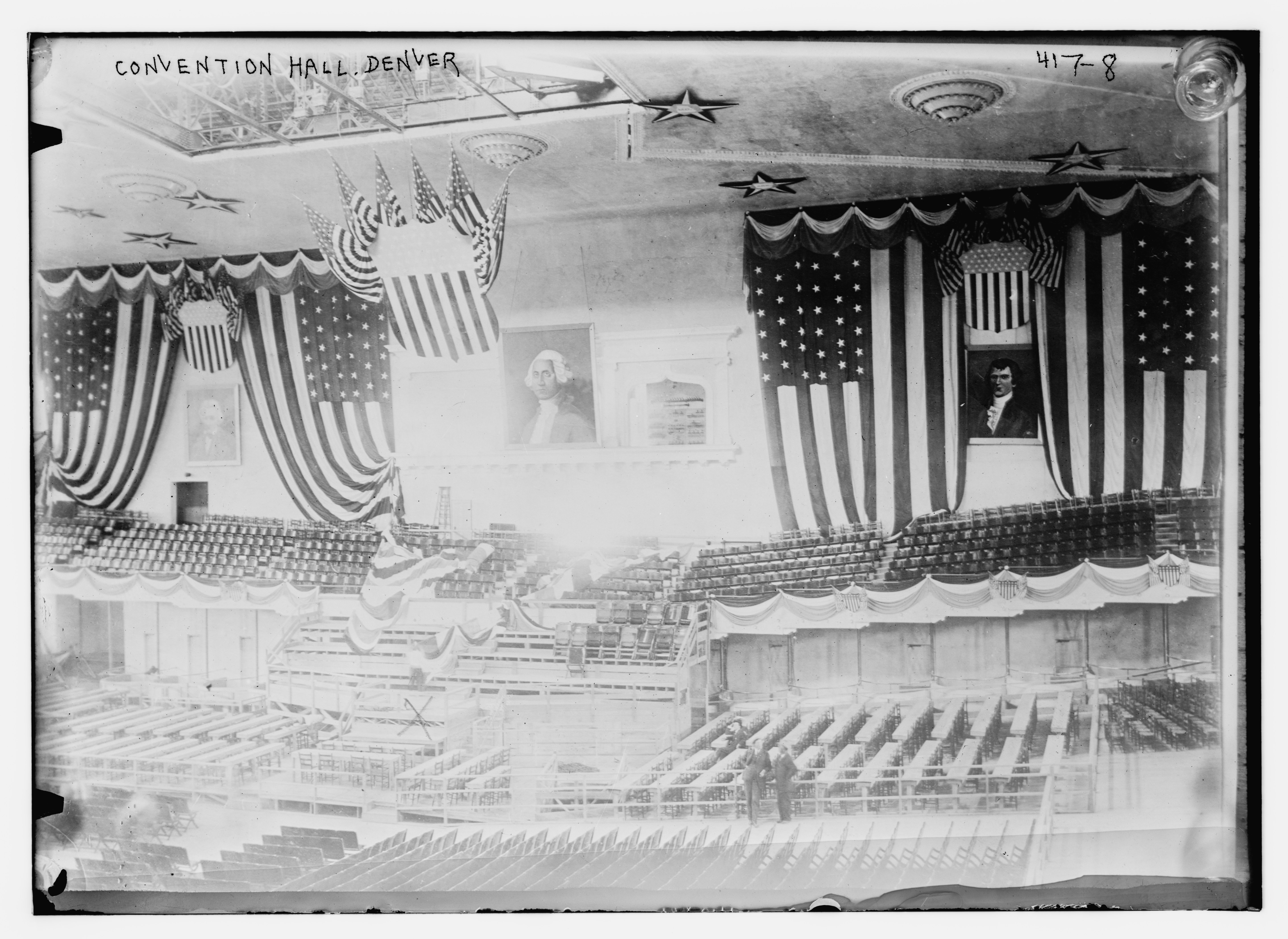
Convention Hall, Denver

Three names were placed in nomination: William Jennings Bryan, John A. Johnson, and George Gray. Bryan was unanimously declared the candidate for president after handily winning the first ballot's roll call.

Presidential ballot
	1st	Unanimous
William Jennings Bryan	888.5	1002
George Gray	59.5	
John A. Johnson	46	
Blank	8	

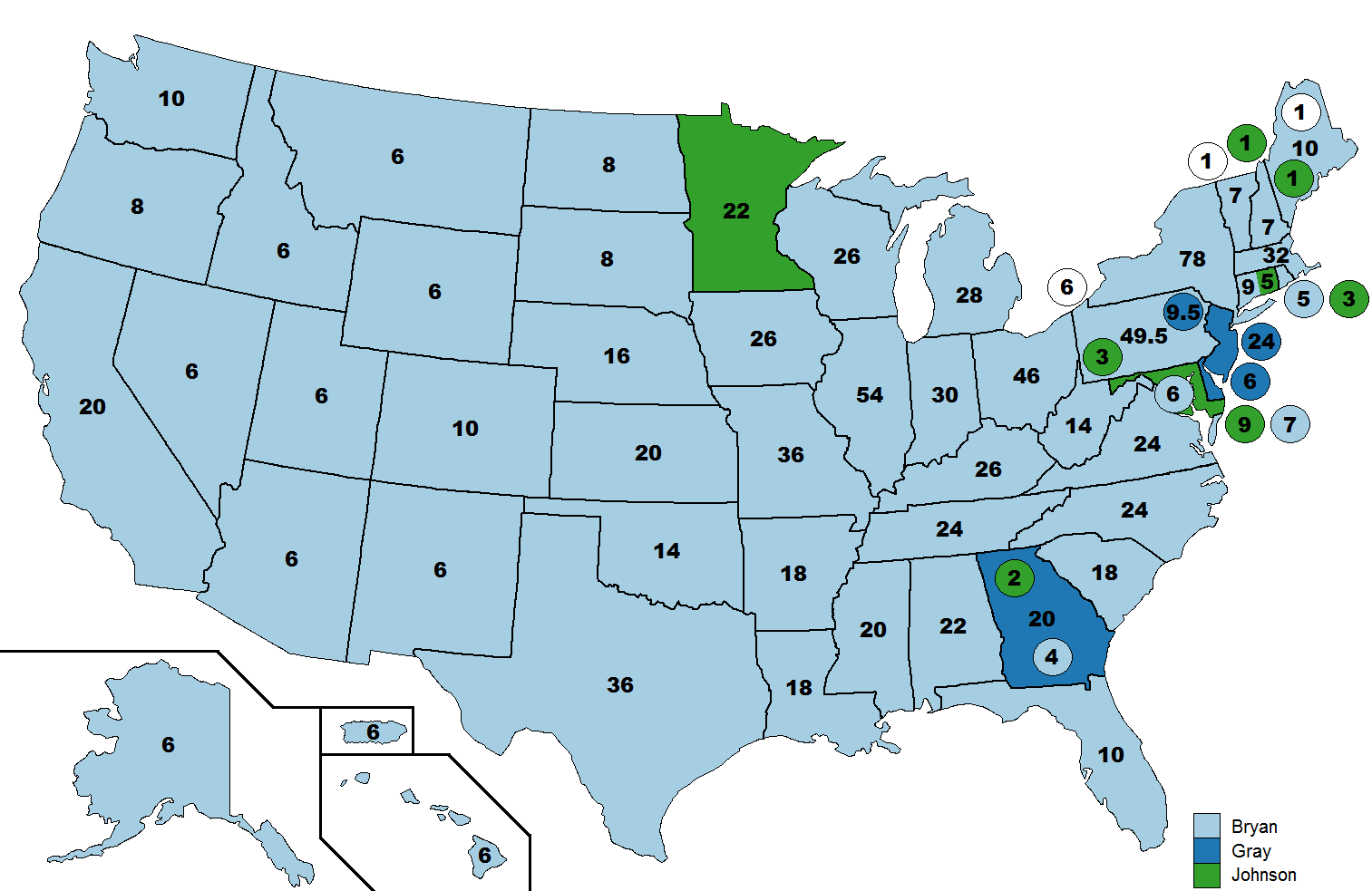
1st presidential ballot

== Vice presidential nomination ==
=== Candidates ===
John W. Kern	Charles A. Towne	Archibald McNeil	Clark Howell	John Mitchell
Former State Senator from Indiana (1893–1897)	Former U.S. Representative for New York's 14th District (1905–1907)	Coal Merchant from Connecticut	Former State Senator from Georgia (1901–1905)	5th President of the UMW from Illinois (1898–1907)
	NW: Before 1st Ballot	NW: Before 1st Ballot	NW: Before 1st Ballot	DTBN
Jerry B. Sullivan	David R. Francis	George Gray	William G. Conrad	
Attorney at Law from Iowa	20th U.S. Secretary of the Interior from Missouri (1896–1897)	Federal Appeals Judge from Delaware (1899–1914)	Banker and Businessman from Montana	
DTBN	DTBN	DTBN	DTBN	

=== Speculated candidates ===
Lewis S. Chanler	John B. Stanchfield	John A. Johnson	Judson Harmon	William H. Berry	Morgan J. O'Brien	Herman A. Metz
46th Lieutenant Governor of New York (1907–1908)	Attorney at Law from New York	16th Governor of Minnesota (1905–1909)	41st U.S. Attorney General from Ohio (1895–1897)	State Treasurer of Pennsylvania (1907–1908)	Justice of the First; Judicial Department from New York (1896–1906)	New York City Comptroller from New York (1906–1909)
Francis B. Harrison	William L. Douglas	Martin W. Littleton	Ollie Murray James	William J. Gaynor	Herman Ridder	Joseph W. Folk
U.S. Representative for New York's 16th District (1907–1913)	42nd Governor of Massachusetts (1905–1906)	Former Borough President of Brooklyn from New York (1904–1905)	U.S. Representative for Kentucky's 1st District (1903–1913)	Justice of the Second; Judicial Department from New York (1905–1909)	President and Editor of the New Yorker Staats-Zeitung from New York (1907–1915)	31st Governor of Missouri (1905–1909)

John W. Kern of Indiana was unanimously declared the candidate for vice-president without a formal ballot after the names of Charles A. Towne, Archibald McNeil, and Clark Howell were withdrawn from consideration.

Vice presidential ballot
	Unanimous
John W. Kern	1002

== See also ==
- History of the Democratic Party (United States)
- 1908 Republican National Convention
- 1908 United States presidential election

Preceded by 1904 St. Louis, Missouri	Democratic National Conventions; 1908	Succeeded by 1912 Baltimore, Maryland
