= John O. Sheatz =

American politician and Pennsylvania state treasurer

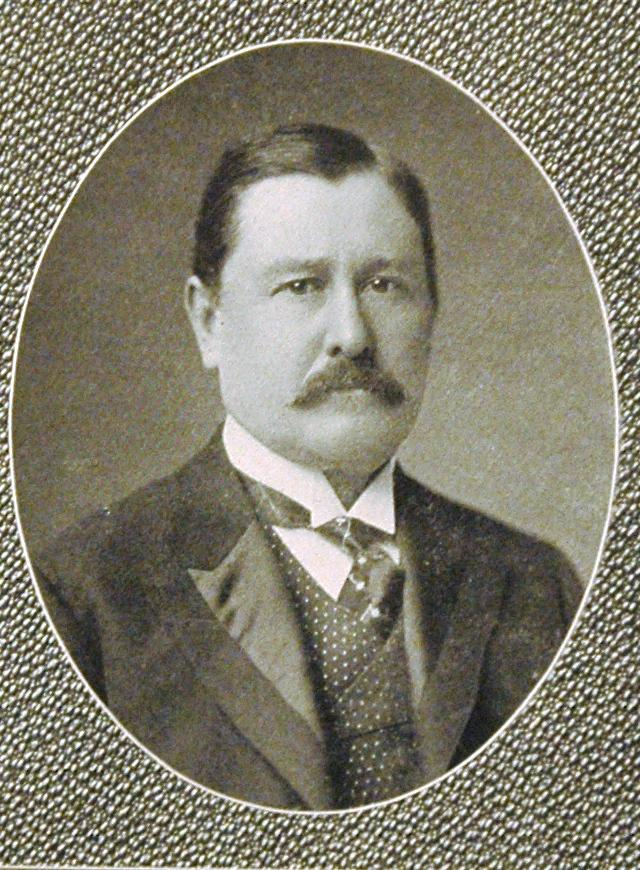
- Sheatz in 1907

52nd Treasurer of Pennsylvania
- In office 1908–1911
- Governor: Edwin S. Stuart
- Preceded by: William H. Berry
- Succeeded by: Charles Frederick Wright

Personal details
- Born: John Oscar Sheatz; February 27, 1856 Lehigh County, Pennsylvania, U.S.
- Died: June 25, 1922 (aged 66) Atlantic City, New Jersey, U.S.
- Resting place: West Laurel Hill Cemetery, Bala Cynwyd, Pennsylvania, U.S.
- Education: Muhlenberg College
- Occupation: Politician, railroad executive

John Oscar Sheatz (February 27, 1856 – June 25, 1922) was an American politician and railroad executive who served in the Pennsylvania House of Representatives (1903–1908) and Pennsylvania State Senate (1913–1914) and one term as elected Pennsylvania State Treasurer (1908–1911). Sheatz was a member of the Republican Party from Philadelphia County.

== Early life and career ==
Sheatz was born on February 27, 1856, in Lehigh County, Pennsylvania, to parents John and Amelia Troxell Von Steuben Sheatz. He attended public schools and spent one term at Muhlenberg College before completing a five-year apprenticeship at Baldwin Locomotive Works, a factory owned by the Lehigh Valley Railroad Company. He worked at the company for thirteen years and rose into management while launching his own lines of business in coal and real estate. He also worked as treasurer of the Frank Queen Publishing Company in New York and served in the 1st Regiment, Pennsylvania National Guard.

== Political career ==
Sheatz entered politics when he served as a Republican state convention delegate in the 1890s. In 1902 he won election to the Pennsylvania House of Representatives, serving from 1903 to 1908 and representing the 24th ward of West Philadelphia. He chaired the House Appropriations Committee and developed a rapport with Governor Edwin S. Stuart. He won the November 1907 election to become Pennsylvania State Treasurer, handily defeating Democratic nominee John G. Harman of Columbia County and serving a single term from 1908 to 1911.

Two years later, he ran for state senate in a special election to fill a vacancy left by the resignation of Senator Ernest L. Tustin of Philadelphia County. Sheatz won the election handily and served as a state senator from 1913 to 1914, including on Senate committees for Appropriations, Congressional Apportionment, Insurance, and Pensions and Gratuities (which he chaired). His name was floated for governor but never nominated.

== Personal life ==
Sheatz married Elizabeth Harvey (Queen) Sheatz in 1885. They had two children: Marion John Sheatz and Elizabeth Sheatz.

He died of a stroke on June 25, 1922, at the Hotel Raleigh in Atlantic City, New Jersey, and was interred at West Laurel Hill Cemetery in Bala Cynwyd, Pennsylvania.

Party political offices
Preceded by J. Lee Plummer	Republican nominee for Treasurer of Pennsylvania; 1907	Succeeded by Jeremiah A. Stober
