= Wendell J. Ashton =

Personal details
- Born: Wendell Jeremy Ashton; October 13, 1912
- Died: August 31, 1995 (aged 82)

Wendell Jeremy Ashton (October 13, 1912 – August 31, 1995) was an American journalist and author. He was a publisher of the Deseret News and director of the Public Communications Department of the Church of Jesus Christ of Latter-day Saints (LDS Church). He was the elder brother of church apostle Marvin J. Ashton.

== Biography ==
=== Early life ===
Ashton was a graduate of LDS High School in Salt Lake City, Utah. He then attended the University of Utah where he earned a degree in business.

=== Career ===
Ashton served an LDS mission in the British Isles. He was a mission companion of future church president Gordon B. Hinckley. During his mission service, Ashton was editor of the Millennial Star, the church newspaper in England. Prior to his mission, Ashton worked as a reporter for the Salt Lake Telegram for three years.

Returning to the newspaper business in Utah, Ashton was the managing editor of the Deseret News from 1947 to 1948. He then joined Gilham Advertising, Inc. in 1950 and remained there until becoming the LDS Church's director of Public Affairs in 1972. In this capacity, Ashton dealt with the issue of the Howard Hughes "Mormon Will". Ashton was the publisher of the Deseret News from 1978 to 1985.

In the LDS Church, Ashton served as a member of the Sunday School General Board starting in the 1930s. He later served as president of the East Mill Creek Stake (where Hinckley had also been stake president). He was one of the original regional representatives called in 1967. Ashton also served as General Secretary of the Sunday School. As a result of this position he served as associate editor of The Instructor, the magazine of the Sunday School until the LDS Church magazines were reconfigured in 1971.

From 1985 to 1988 Ashton served as president of the church's England London Mission. At the time of his death, Ashton was a sealer in the Salt Lake Temple.

Ashton and his first wife, Marian Reynolds, had six children. After she died, he married Belva Barlow in 1964. Wendell and Belva had one daughter. Belva had previously worked as a secretary to Henry Eyring, when he was director of graduate studies at the University of Utah. She served as a member of the church's Relief Society general board for 16 years during their marriage, and oversaw the building of the Monument to Women Memorial Garden in Nauvoo, Illinois.

Ashton was the National President of the Sons of Utah Pioneers in 1947 and was the main organizer of the 1947 commemoration of the Nauvoo to Salt Lake City journey of the pioneers 100 years before.

Ashton served as head of the Salt Lake Area Chamber of Commerce and was a key backer of the Utah Symphony. He was also involved in persuading the owners of the National Basketball Association (NBA)'s New Orleans Jazz to relocate the team from its original home of New Orleans to Salt Lake City for the 1979–80 NBA season (the team now competes as the Utah Jazz.)

Ashton also wrote several books, one along with Ab Jenkins. He also wrote a biography of Aurelia Spencer Rogers. His Voice in the West Biography of a Pioneer Newspaper (New York: Duell, Sloan & Pearce, 1950) has been cited in such places as the Utah History Encyclopedia as an excellent source on the early history of the Deseret News.

There is currently a Wendell J. Ashton endowed professorship in communications at Brigham Young University.
