= Sons of Utah Pioneers =

Historical organization focusing on Utah, United States

The National Society of the Sons of Utah Pioneers (SUP) is an organization dedicated to preserving the legacy and studying the history of the Mormon Pioneers of Utah and the West. The organization is open to "All good men of every age and circumstance who have an interest in the early Utah Pioneers. It is not necessary to have pioneer ancestry to join."

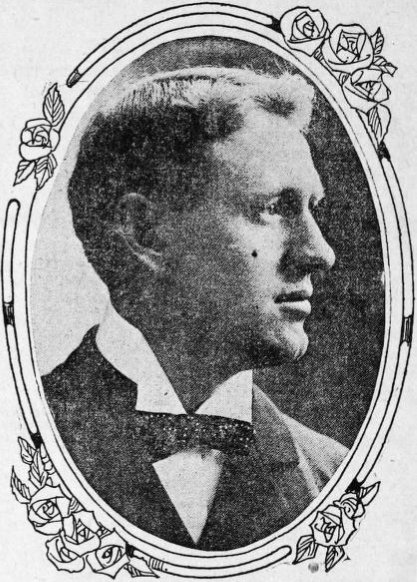
Nephi L. Morris

== History ==
The Sons of Utah Pioneers was officially organized in 1933. The first National president was Lawrence T. Epperson. He was succeeded by Nephi L. Morris, who was also president of the Salt Lake Stake of the LDS Church at the time. In 1947, during the centennial of the entry of the first Mormon pioneers into the Great Salt Lake valley, the Sons of Utah Pioneers organized an elaborate commemorative journey of the original Mormon trek to Utah. Prominent Mormon writer and newspaper publisher Wendell J. Ashton was the National president of the SUP at that time.

In 1982 a national headquarters building was completed in the East Mill Creek area of Salt Lake City. Administrative offices and a print library are housed there, as well as meeting rooms for local and national events.

== Organization ==
Membership is divided into chapters where members meet, usually monthly, to hear speakers on subjects of interest in history, geography, biography, as well as topics on Mormon culture. Chapters often organize "treks" lasting one day to a week where members travel to historical sites to learn more about pioneer history, as well as to socialize with others of like interests.

The Sons of Utah Pioneers publish the quarterly Pioneer magazine, a full-color print publication containing historical articles, photographs and artwork about the Mormon Pioneers as a group, the individuals and families who comprised the Mormon Pioneers, and the places they settled.

The organization sponsors an annual historical symposium at the headquarters building in Salt Lake City, and periodic regional history symposiums in other areas of the intermountain west.

== See also ==
- Daughters of the Utah Handcart Pioneers
- Daughters of Utah Pioneers
- List of Mormon family organizations
- Mormon pioneers
- List of Sons of Utah Pioneers historic monuments

== Sources ==
- A History of the Sons of Utah Pioneers by Thomas G. Alexander
- Utah History Encyclopedia article on Sons of Utah Pioneers
