= List of Sons and Daughters of Utah Pioneers historic monuments =

The Sons of Utah Pioneers and Daughters of Utah Pioneers have erected many monuments throughout the west commemorating historic moments. The following is a detail of the monuments.

State	County	Locality	Year created	Name	Image
Arizona	Apache	St. Johns	1987	Early Settlers, Salem, AZ	
Arizona	Coconino	Fredonia	1933	Pipe Spring National Monument Directional Plaque	
Arizona	Coconino	Stoneman Lake	1991	Palatkwapi Trail	
Arizona	Coconino	Tonalea	1938	George A. Smith Jr. Killed	
Arizona	Graham	Safford	1982	Spencer W. Kimball Home	
Arizona	Maricopa	Mesa	1988	Mesa Pioneer Monument	
Arizona	Maricopa	Phoenix	1982	First Latter-Day Saint chapel in Phoenix	
Arizona	Mohave	Near Grand Staircase–Escalante National Monument	2005	The Historic Dixie-Long Valley, Utah Pioneer Trail	
Arizona	Mohave	Pipe Springs	1933	Pipe Spring National Monument	
Arizona	Navajo	Brigham City	1934	Pioneer Settlement and Cemetery	
Arizona	Navajo	Snowflake	1940	Tom Polaca	
Arizona	Navajo	Snowflake		Tuba, Hopi Chief	
Arizona	Pinal	Picacho	1937	Mormon Battalion Trail	
California	Alpine	Carson Pass	1993	Mormon-Carson Pass Emigrant Trail (Melissa Coray Peak)	
California	El Dorado	Coloma	1972	Mormon Worker's Cabin at Marshall Gold Discovery State Historic Park	
California	El Dorado	Coloma	1977	Nathaniel Hawk	
California	Fresno	Squaw Valley	1974	Mormon Emigrant Trail	
California	San Bernardino	Sycamore Valley Ranch	1962	First Camp of the Pioneers	
California	San Bernardino	near San Bernardino	1991	Mormon Lumber Road	
California	San Diego	San Diego	1969	The 500 Volunteer Soldiers of the Mormon Battalion 1846-1848	
