= William L. Mathues =

American politician (1862–1908)

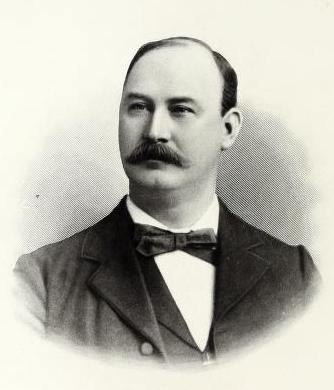

50th Treasurer of Pennsylvania
- In office January 1, 1905 – November 30, 1906
- Governor: Samuel W. Pennypacker
- Preceded by: Frank G. Harris
- Succeeded by: William H. Berry

Personal details
- Born: March 24, 1862; Middletown Township, Delaware County, Pennsylvania, U.S.
- Died: December 30, 1908 (aged 46); Media, Pennsylvania, U.S.
- Political party: Republican

William Lincoln Mathues (March 24, 1862 – December 30, 1908) was an American politician who served as Pennsylvania Treasurer from 1905 to 1906. Born and raised on a farm in Delaware County, Mathues attended public schools in Media, became a lawyer, and served as deputy sheriff and prothonotary between 1885 and 1904. He was convicted on corruption charges in connection to the Pennsylvania State Capitol graft scandal and died of pneumonia in 1908 before going to prison.

Party political offices
Preceded by Frank G. Harris	Republican nominee for Treasurer of Pennsylvania; 1903	Succeeded by J. Lee Plummer
Political offices
Preceded by Frank G. Harris	Treasurer of Pennsylvania; 1905–1906	Succeeded by William H. Berry
