= Georgina G. Marriott =

American teacher

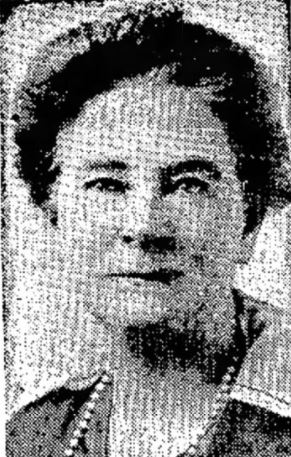
Georgina G. Marriott

Georgina Petrina Geertsen Marriott (born June 29, 1865) was a Utah teacher and clubwoman.

== Early life ==
Georgina Petrina Geertsen was born in Huntsville, Utah, on June 29, 1865, the daughter of Peter C. and Marianne Pedersen Geertsen.

She attended Weber County and Ogden City schools. She graduated from the University of Deseret in 1882.

== Career ==
She taught school for 15 years.

She was the president of Relief Society in the Marriott and Ogden Thirds wards and of the North Weber Stake Relief Society, of the Child Culture Club, of the International Relations Club and of the Odgen City Federation of Women's Clubs.

She was the author of many newspaper and magazine articles.

For 6 years she was a member and then director of the Utah State Fair Board.

She was also a member of the State Federation of Women's Clubs and of the Emeritus club of the University of Utah. She was a Weber board member of the Daughters of Utah Pioneers.

She was a Utah Republican leader for the Women's suffrage movement.

During World War I she was active with the American Red Cross and later traveled Utah for the Service Star Legion introducing the Veterans of Foreign Wars Poppy Drive. She served as president of the Ogden Chapter of the American Red Cross. She participated to the Liberty Loan campaign and was in charge of the Education Institutions in Utah.

In 1915 she was a graduate of the Ogden Chautauqua Literary and Scientific Circle. She was an officer and reader of the Vincent Chautauqua Reading Circle.

In 1916 she participated in the election of the Ogden City Board of Education but did not win.

She travelled extensively in Europe and New Zealand. In Europe she made a study of art galleries.

In 1929 her song "Utah" won the song contest of the Ogden district of the Utah Federation of Women's Clubs.

In 1935 she was the Utah delegate at the National Convention of the Federation of Women's Clubs in Detroit; on this occasion she was awarded the silver loving cup for her special work.

== Personal life ==
On January 18, 1883, she married Moroni Stewart Marriott (1857-1939), a bishop of the Marriott and Ogden Tenth wards, and they served as church missionaries in the New Zealand. They had five children: Winifred M. Steffenson, Glenna Packer, Lois Wilcox, Sherman J. Marriott, Phyllis Marriott. She lived at 225 23rd St., Ogden, Utah.

She died on August 7, 1946, in Ogden, and is buried in the Aultorest Memorial Park, Ogden, Utah.
