= Lone Cedar Tree =

Monument in Utah, United States

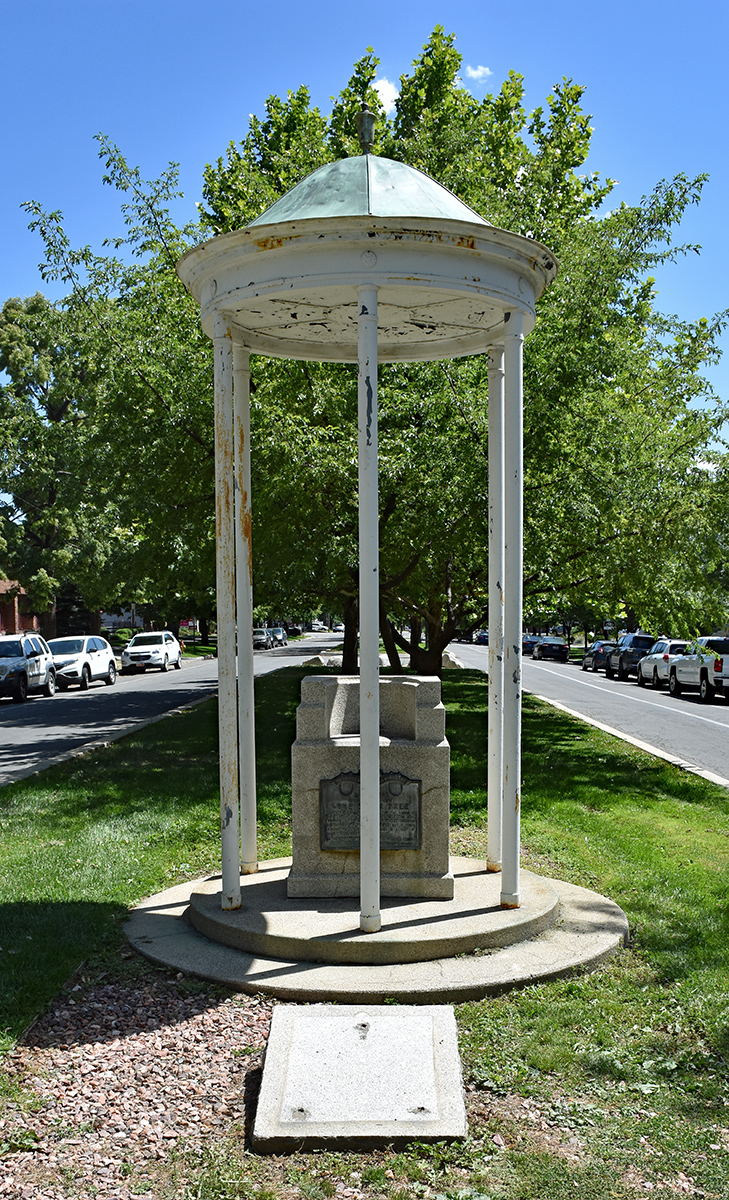
- Monument near the site of the Lone Cedar Tree.
- Interactive map of Lone Cedar Tree
- Location: 720 East Ashton Avenue; Salt Lake City, Utah; United States
- Coordinates: 40.7625°N 111.8738°W
- Designer: Central Company
- Completion date: July 4, 1933
- Restored date: 1960

The Lone Cedar Tree is a historical monument located on 600 East between 300 and 400 South, near downtown Salt Lake City, Utah, United States. According to Mormon Pioneers, it was the location of the only tree growing in the valley in 1847, when they arrived. On July 4, 1933, the Daughters of Utah Pioneers erected the monument to honor the Mormon heritage and history of Salt Lake City.

== Monument ==
The tree was fenced in to protect it from vandals in 1924. The monument was erected in 1933.

== Plaque ==
A plaque on the monument reads "The street to the north was originally Emigration Road - the only approach from the East. Over this road the pioneers of 1847 and subsequent years entered the valley of the Great Salt Sea. They found growing near this site a lone cedar and paused beneath its shade. Songs were sung and prayers of gratitude offered by those early pilgrims. Later the cedar tree became a meeting place for the loggers going to the canyons, children played beneath its branches, lovers made it a trysting place. Because of its friendly influence on the lives of the early men and women, the site is dedicated in their memory."

== Vandalism ==
On the evening of September 21, 1958, vandals cut away the remaining trunk on the memorial, leaving only a flat stump. A $100 (equivalent to $1,116 in 2025) reward was offered by the Daughters for return of the missing part. Ashes supposedly from the stolen tree were found later in a bus locker. However, the ashes proved to be from a Douglas fir. A bronze replica was installed in its place. The stump was later sawed off and stolen. The monument is still standing.
