= John W. Slayton =

American socialist lecturer and politician

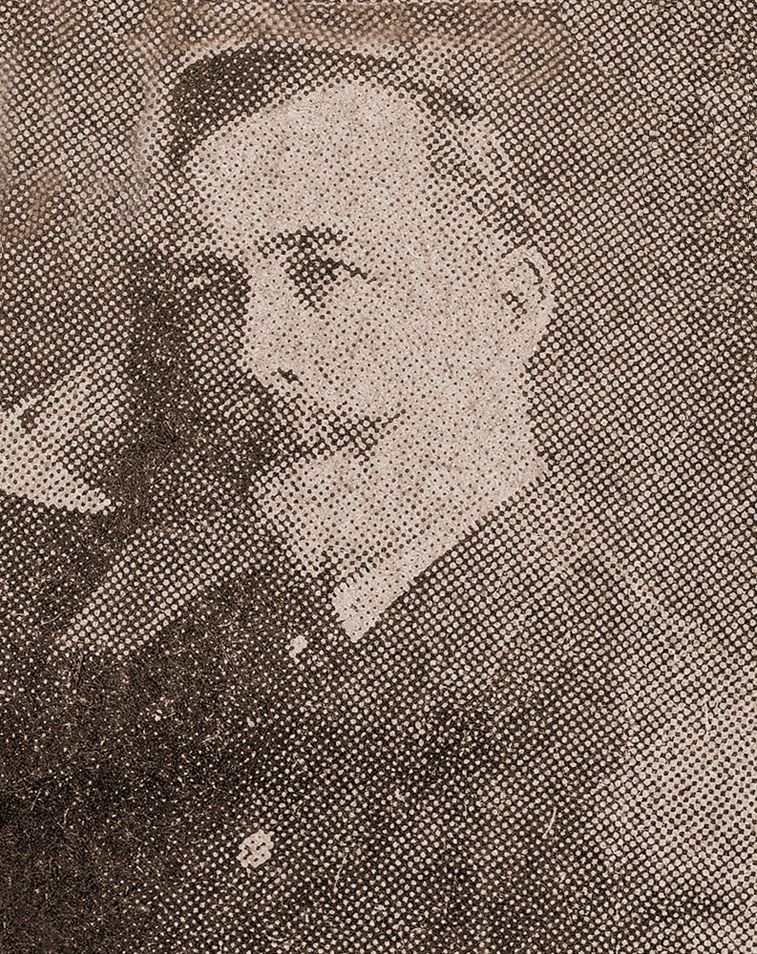
John Slayton was one of the Socialist Party of America's prominent faces in the decade of the 1910s.

John W. Slayton (1863–1935) was an American socialist lecturer and politician. He is best remembered as one of the Socialist Party of America's leading propagandists in the Eastern United States during the decade of the 1910s.

== Biography ==
=== Early years ===
John W. Slayton was born in January 1863 in Virginia. He was unable to read until the age of 13 and attended a total of only 15 months of school in a rural log school house. Instead, Slayton developed himself through self-education, studying in his spare time.

Slayton was a carpenter by trade and a member of the United Brotherhood of Carpenters and Joiners.

Slayton moved to New Castle, Pennsylvania, in 1900, where he served for a time as the business agent of the local Building Trades unions. He remained an active member of the Carpenters Union, attending many of the group's national conventions and serving as its delegate to four national conventions of the American Federation of Labor.

=== Political career ===
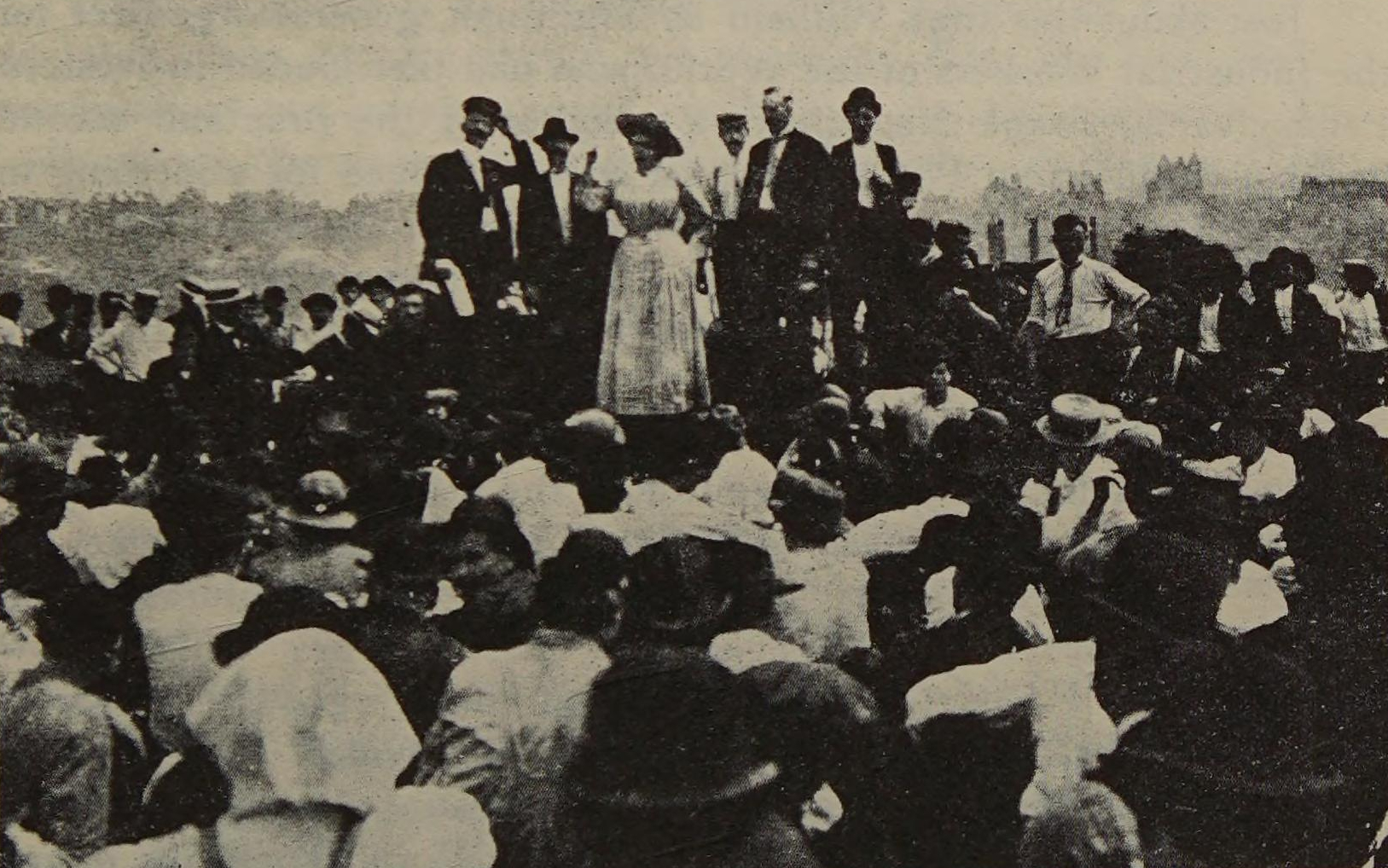
Socialist Party activists Slayton and Mrs. A.J. Meng address strikers during the 1909 McKees Rocks Strike.

John W. Slayton was a pioneer American socialist, a member of the Social Democratic Party of America in the late 1890s. Slayton's first foray into electoral politics came in 1900, when he ran for U.S. Congress on the Social Democratic ticket.

When the Chicago-based Social Democratic Party, to which Slayton owed his allegiance, united with an Eastern-based organization of the same name which had defected from the Socialist Labor Party in 1901, Slayton joined the new organization, known as the Socialist Party of America (SPA). In 1903, Slayton was employed by the Party as one of its "National Lecturers" and he toured throughout the East and Midwest speaking on socialist themes.

In 1905, Slayton served as campaign manager for Walter Tyler in his race for Mayor of New Castle. Tyler won the contest, making New Castle the first town in Pennsylvania to have a Socialist at the head of its civic administration. Slayton was himself later elected to the New Castle city council.

Slayton was a leader of the 1909 McKees Rocks Strike, a work stoppage by 6,000 steel car workers. On August 22, the strikers initiated violence, resulting in the death of sixteen people, including the deputy sheriff, two state troopers, and three strikers.

Slayton was a delegate to the National Convention of the Socialist Party held in Chicago in May 1908. He was also elected a delegate from Pennsylvania to the so-called "National Congress" of the Socialist Party held in May 1910.

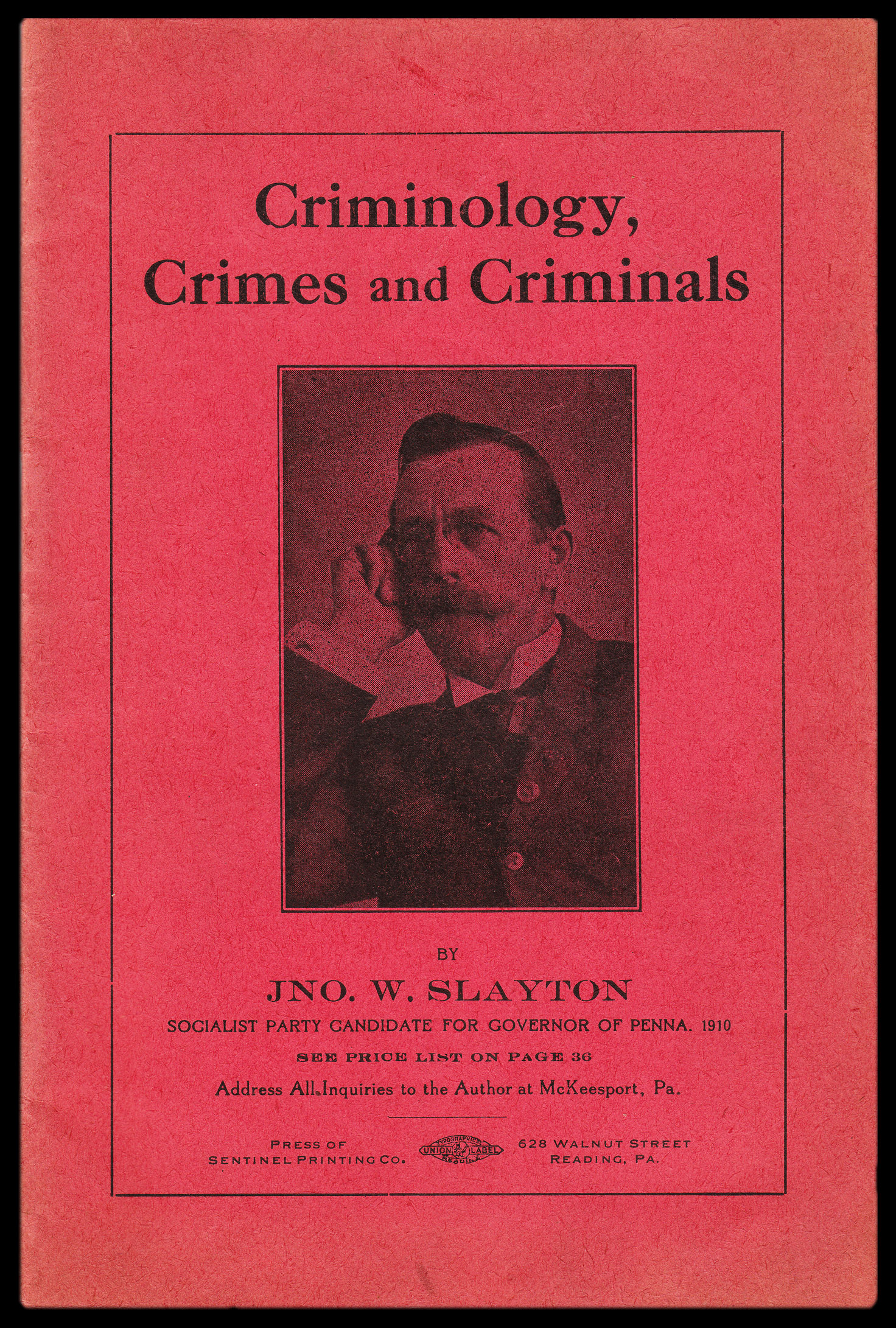
Slayton helped finance his two speaking tours of America with the sale of self-published pamphlets.

In the fall of 1910, Slayton stood as the candidate of the Socialist Party for Governor of Pennsylvania. Slayton received over 9,600 votes in the race, good enough for a third-place finish in Allegany County, although well behind the 48,000 garnered by the winning candidate, Republican John K. Tener. However, due to the fact that the Democratic vote was split between a "Keystone Reform" candidate and the candidate of the regular Democratic Party, the Democrats finished fourth in Allegany County. Under Pennsylvania state law, this gave the Socialist Party the third line on the state ballot and a quota of watchers at the polls to which the Democrats ordinarily would have been entitled, thus making fraudulent undercounting of the Socialist vote more difficult in the future.

In 1916, Slayton was a candidate for the governing National Executive Committee of the Socialist Party, but he was eliminated from consideration after the first ballot. He received 2,714 votes in the referendum of party members, finishing 23rd of 31 candidates.

Slayton ran for Congress a second time in 1924 in the state's 35th District. Two years later, he made a second attempt at becoming Pennsylvania's Governor.

Despite his various political candidacies, Slayton is best remembered as having been one of the Socialist Party's team of professional touring agitators — individuals who would be booked through the National Office of the SPA to deliver speeches or engage in public debates. During the course of his career as a public speaker, Slayton toured the breadth of the United States twice, speaking in 46 of the 48 states and defending the Socialist position in 132 debates.

=== Death and legacy ===
Slayton died on June 5, 1935, in Pittsburgh, at the age of 72. He was remembered at the time of his death for being "nationally known as an impressive and eloquent speaker." He was survived by his wife, four daughters, and a son.

== Works ==
- Criminology, Crimes and Criminals. Reading, PA: John W. Slayton, 1910.
- Props to Capitalism. Allegheny, PA: John W. Slayton, n.d. (c. 1910).
- The United States Constitution: A "Class" Document. McKeesport, PA: John W. Slayton, c. 1910.
- Socialism: The Old Red Flag of Peace, Industry, and Universal Brotherhood. Pittsburgh, PA: John W. Slayton, 1919.
