= Elizabeth Pugsley Hayward =

American politician (1854–1942)

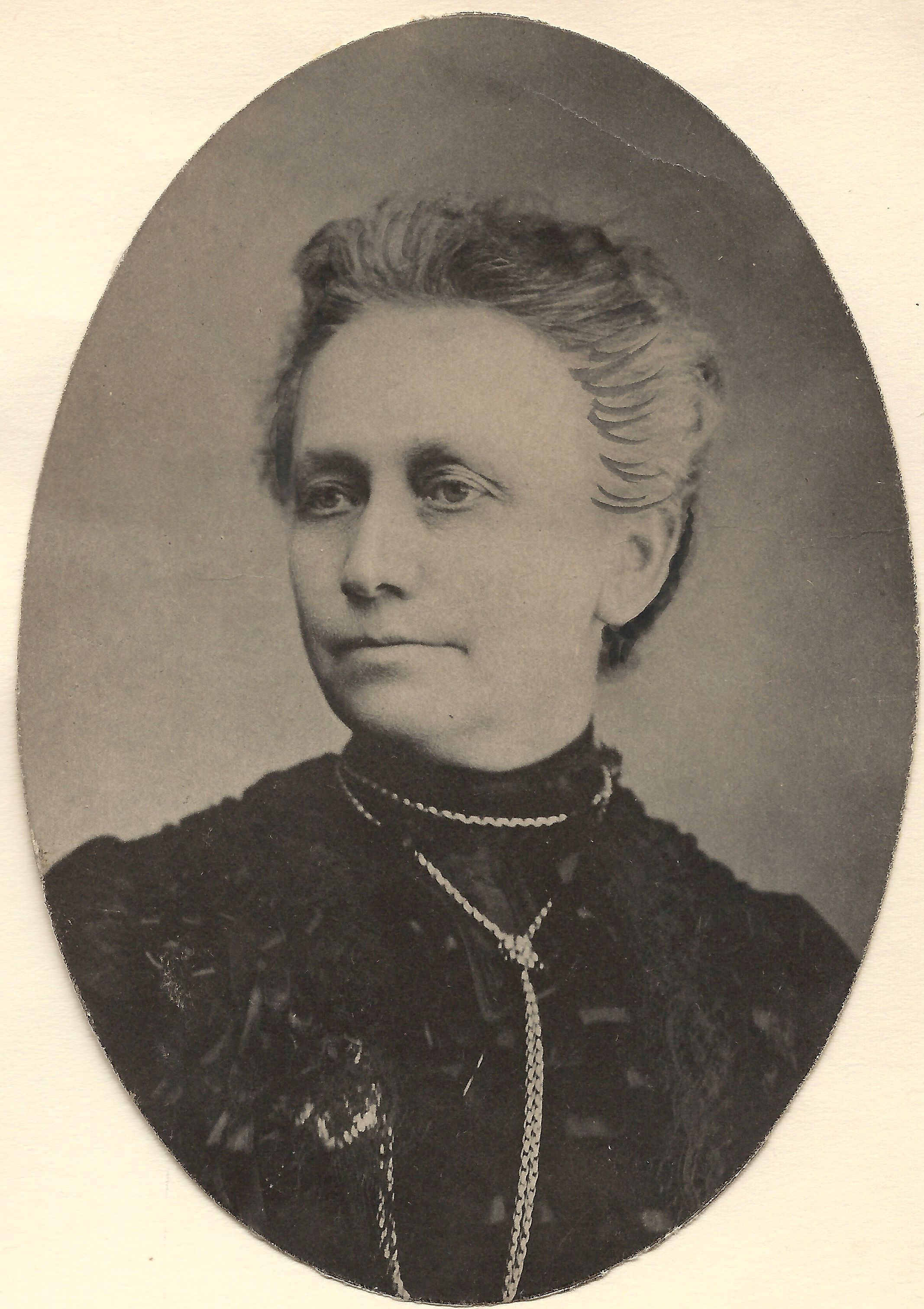

Salt Lake City Council
- In office 1895–unknown

Utah State House
- In office 1915–1918

Utah State Senator
- In office 1919–1922

Personal details
- Born: December 23, 1854
- Died: January 26, 1942 (aged 87)
- Party: Democratic Party
- Spouse: Henry J. Hayward
- Children: 9
- Occupation: Politician

Elizabeth Pugsley Hayward (December 23, 1854 – January 26, 1942) was an American politician and Democratic member of the Utah House of Representatives and Utah State Senate.

== Biography ==
Elizabeth Pugsley was born in Salt Lake City, Utah Territory, to recent English immigrants Philip and Martha Pugsley. She married Henry John Hayward in 1875, and was often known in her public life as "Mrs. H. J. Hayward." She served as President of Daughters of Utah Pioneers from 1917 to 1921.

Elizabeth Hayward was a member and officer of the local chapter of the Service Star Legion.

== Legislative activity ==
Hayward was first elected as a state representative for the Eighth District (Salt Lake City) in the Utah House of Representatives in 1914. She served on the Art, Public Health, and State Library Committees and introduced bills regarding art, education and child welfare. She was elected again in 1917. She served in the Utah State Senate in the 1919 and 1921 sessions.

Elizabeth Hayward introduced the bill into the Utah State Senate ratifying the Nineteenth Amendment to the United States Constitution, which granted women the right to vote in national elections.

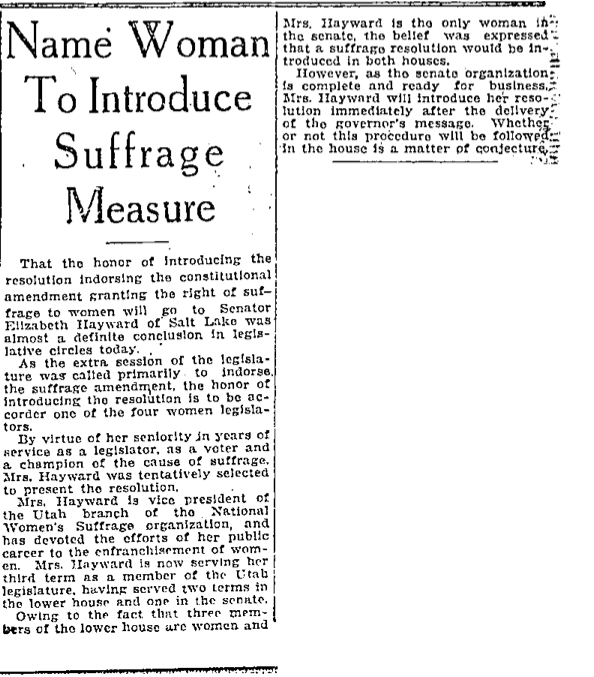
Salt Lake Telegram article noting that Senator Elizabeth Hayward would introduce the "resolution indorsing the constitutional amendment granting the right of suffrage to women."

== National political activity ==
Elizabeth Hayward was a member of the Democratic National Committee. She served as a delegate to the 1908 Democratic National Convention, one of the first women to serve as a national delegate from either major party. She also served as a delegate to the 1916 Democratic National Convention in St. Louis and the 1920 Democratic National Convention in San Francisco.

Elizabeth Hayward was a charter member of the League of Women Voters.
