= Days of '47 Parade =

Annual parade in Salt Lake City, US

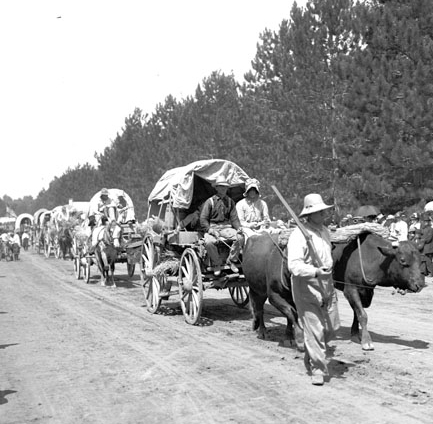
- Re-enactment of Mormon pioneers in the 1912 Pioneer Days Parade at Liberty Park, Salt Lake City, Utah.
- Genre: Parade
- Date: July 24
- Frequency: Annually
- Location: Salt Lake City
- Coordinates: 40°46′10″N 111°53′28″W
- Country: United States
- Inaugurated: July 24, 1849
- Website: Official site of The Days of '47 Parade

The Days of '47 Parade is an annual parade presented by The Days of '47, Inc. The three-hour event is held in Salt Lake City starting at 9:00 a.m. MDT on or around July 24, the same day as Pioneer Day, a Utah state holiday.

== History ==
On July 24, 1847, Brigham Young and a company of Mormon pioneers arrived in the Salt Lake Valley, where members of the Church of Jesus Christ of Latter-day Saints (LDS Church) settled after emigrating from Nauvoo, Illinois and other locations in the eastern United States. Pulling handcarts or driving wagons with oxen or horses, thousands of pioneers made the trek across the plains to a vast desert landscape that became known as the Utah Territory.

According to Days of '47 Inc. "This trek of the early Utah pioneers exemplifies the courage, foresight, and faith that continue to inspire modern-day pioneers. By remembering those remarkable 1847 pioneers and all those who followed, The Days of '47 seeks to make their accomplishments and hardships live today through a variety of activities and celebrations each year. We believe the example of past and present pioneers' courage is a beacon to the world."

A parade was held on July 24, 1849, in Salt Lake City, long before Days of '47 became an official organization. Beginning in 1931, the "'Covered Wagon Days" parade became an annual event. Since the 1940s, the parade has been known by its current name.

LDS Church wards and stakes, businesses, and community groups have always sponsored floats in the parade. Recently, the parade has become included other churches participating and celebrating their own Utah pioneers. Native Americans march in the pre-parade, which travels down the parade route ahead of the pioneer floats. The military has always been well represented, and of course it always includes horses, bands, children and queens.

For many years, pioneers who arrived in the valley before 1869 were honored with a dinner each July 24. The last living pioneer died January 1, 1968. Her name was Hilda Erickson and she was 108 years old.

There was no parade between 1932 and 1934 because of the Great Depression, in 1943 because of World War II, or in 2020 because of the COVID-19 pandemic.

== Performers and acts ==
In addition to the floats, the parade also features live music and other performances. High school marching bands from across the state participate in the parade, and the television broadcasts feature performances by the bands.

== Television coverage ==
The parade is televised throughout the intermountain area on NBC affiliate KSL-TV.

== Parade route ==
The parade route starts at South Temple and State Street, goes east to 200 East, south to 900 South, then east to Liberty Park at 600 East. Traditionally a fair is held at Liberty Park, with games and rides.

For many decades, the parade started at Temple Square, went south on Main Street, turned east at 9th South, and continued heading east toward Liberty Park where the parade always ended.

== Controversy and criticism ==
In 2014, Mormons Building Bridges, a group which works to improve relations between the LDS and LGBT communities, sought entry to march in the parade, but was denied because the group was deemed too controversial by the parade organizers. In response, the Salt Lake City Council considered boycotting their invitation to participate in the parade, but ultimately decided against a boycott as a Council, instead opting to simply express their opposition to the exclusion of Mormons Building Bridges. Council member Erin Mendenhall chose to decline her invitation to participate in the parade when after submitting the bio of her guest, a gay stay-at-home father married to a man, the organizers of the parade returned that only immediate relatives were eligible as guests of the council. Previously, the council had been informed they could bring "one adult guest".

== Resources ==
- Official site of The Days of '47, Inc.
- "Days of '47 Parade Has Long History". KSL (television and radio).
