= William H. Berry =

American politician

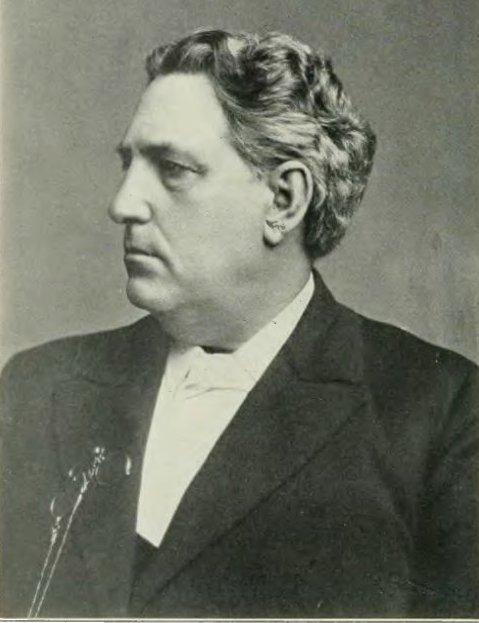

Mayor of Chester, Pennsylvania
- In office February 10, 1905 – December 30, 1905
- Preceded by: Howard H. Huston
- Succeeded by: Samuel E. Turner

51st Treasurer of Pennsylvania
- In office January 1, 1907 – November 30, 1908
- Governor: Edwin S. Stuart
- Preceded by: William L. Mathues
- Succeeded by: John O. Sheatz

Personal details
- Born: September 9, 1852 Edwardsville, Illinois, US
- Died: June 19, 1928 (aged 75) Chester, Pennsylvania, US
- Party: Democratic

William Harvey Berry (September 9, 1852 – June 19, 1928) was an American politician who served as Mayor of Chester, Pennsylvania, for one year in 1905 and as the Pennsylvania State Treasurer from 1906 to 1908. As Treasurer, Berry identified misappropriations in the graft scandal related to furnishing of the Pennsylvania State Capitol. Berry was President of the Berry Engineering Company, worked as Collector of the Port of Philadelphia and authored multiple books on economic policy.

== Early life ==
Berry was born on September 9, 1852, in Edwardsville, Illinois, to Benjamin D. and Mary F. Berry. His father Benjamin was and early pioneer of Illinois and a skilled mechanic having developed several useful inventions.

As a young man, Berry took an apprenticeship in the machine shops of George W. Tifts Sons & Co. in Buffalo, New York. Berry also took a scientific mechanical course at the Mechanics' Institute in Buffalo.

== Career ==
In 1873, after receiving his degree, Berry relocated to Chester, Pennsylvania and was placed in charge of the brick yard of the Eddystone Manufacturing Company. He was appointed master mechanic and held the position for 17 years.

In 1903, Berry established and became President of the Berry Engineering Company in Chester, Pennsylvania which produced a high pressure, super heating boiler. Berry was also treasurer of the Fields Brick Company in Chester, Pennsylvania.

Berry served as mayor of Chester, Pennsylvania from February 1905 to December 1905. He resigned to run for treasurer of Pennsylvania and was the only Democrat to win a statewide election between 1893 and 1931. Berry served as treasurer from 1906 to 1908.

During his tenure as Treasurer, Berry discovered misappropriations of state funds related to the furnishing of the new Pennsylvania State Capitol building in Harrisburg, Pennsylvania. While an additional $700,000 had been appropriated for furnishings, flooring and ceilings, oak wainscoting and artwork - the actual additional unappropriated costs were $7.7 million. Questionable charges such as charging by the pound for chandeliers and charging for the "air space under furniture" were discovered upon investigation. Convictions on charges of conspiracy and false pretense were obtained against architect Joseph Huston, lead contractor John Sanderson, former Auditor General William P. Snyder and former state treasurer William L. Mathues.

In 1910, Berry was a candidate for Governor of Pennsylvania as a member of the independent Keystone Party but lost to the Republican candidate John Kinley Tener.

Berry was a delegate to the Democratic National Convention in 1912 and 1924.

== Personal life ==
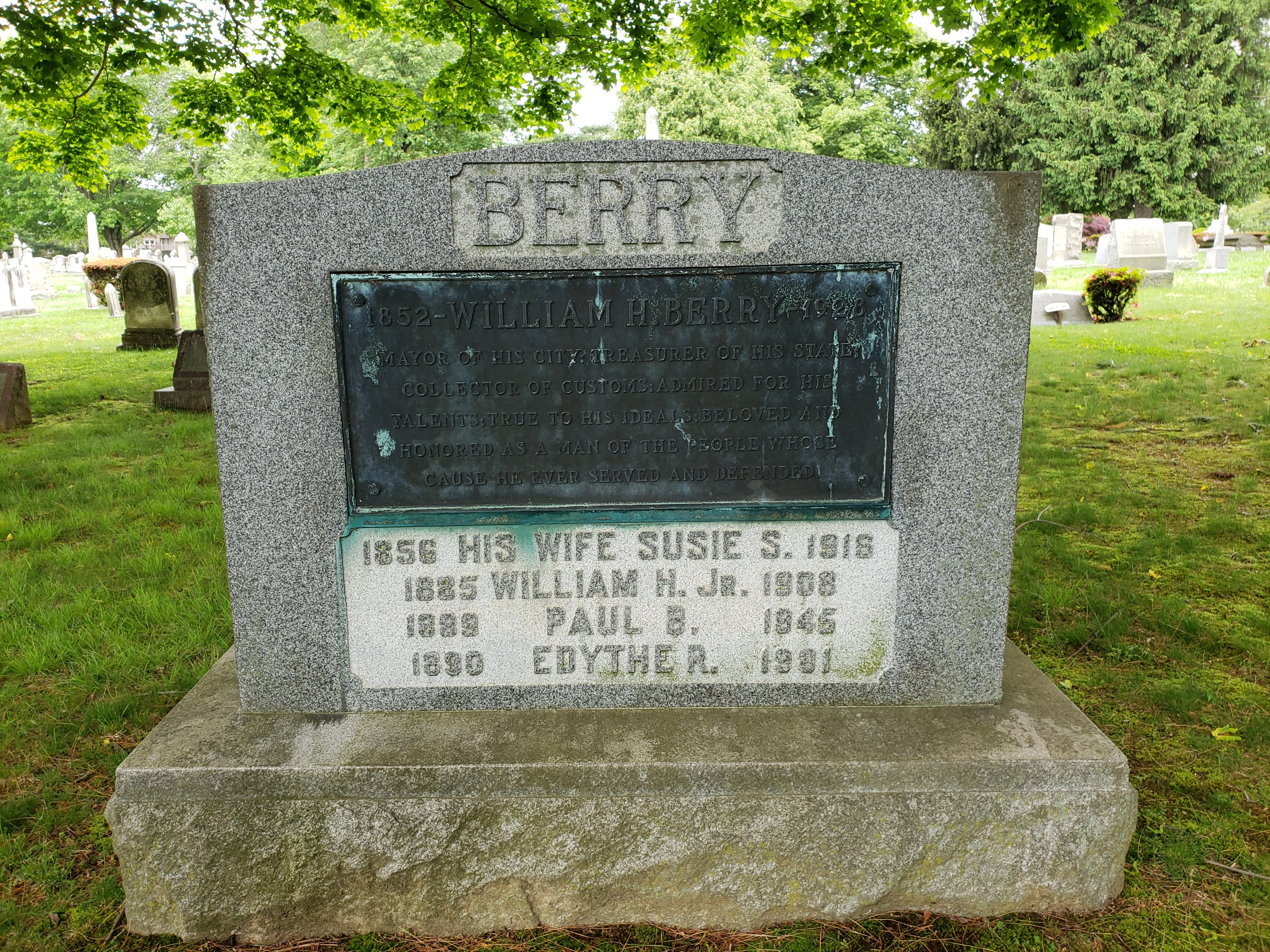
William H. Berry gravestone in Chester Rural Cemetery

His son, US Marine Major Benjamin S. Berry, served in World War I, and for his actions on June 6, 1918, in the Battle of Belleau Wood was awarded the Distinguished Service Cross, the Navy Cross, and the Croix de Guerre from the government of France.

Berry died on June 19, 1928 and is interred at the Chester Rural Cemetery in Chester, Pennsylvania.

== Bibliography ==
- Our Economic Troubles and the Way Out: An Answer to Socialism, John Spencer, Printer and Bookbinder, 1912
- Restricted Industry: Its Effect, Its Cause, the Remedy, The Schulte Publishing Company, 1900

== See also ==
- List of mayors of Chester, Pennsylvania

Party political offices
Preceded by Joel G. Hill	Democratic nominee for Treasurer of Pennsylvania; 1905	Succeeded by John G. Harma
Preceded by George W. Kipp	Democratic nominee for Treasurer of Pennsylvania; 1912	Succeeded by James M. Cramer
Preceded by Howard H. Houston	Mayor of Chester; 1905–1905	Succeeded by Samuel E. Turner
Political offices
Preceded by William L. Mathues	Treasurer of Pennsylvania; 1906–1908	Succeeded by John O. Sheatz
