= Eliza R. Snow =

American religious leader and poet

Eliza Roxey Snow
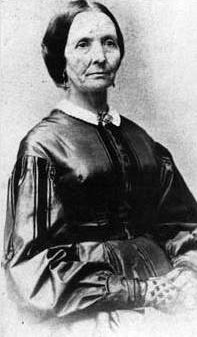
- Eliza Roxey Snow (1870)

2nd Relief Society General President
- December 1866 – December 5, 1887
- Predecessor: Emma Smith
- Successor: Zina D. H. Young

1st Secretary of the Relief Society
- 1842 – 1844

Personal details
- Born: Eliza Roxey Snow; January 21, 1804; Becket, Massachusetts, United States
- Died: December 5, 1887 (aged 83); Salt Lake City, Utah, United States
- Resting place: Mormon Pioneer Memorial Monument; 40.7703°N 111.8856°W
- Spouse(s): Joseph Smith Jr (1842–44; sealed); Brigham Young (1844–77; deceased)
- Signature
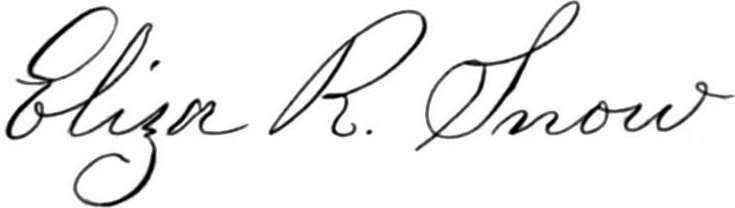

Eliza Roxey Snow (January 21, 1804 – December 5, 1887) was a Mormon Pioneer, poet, and second Relief Society general president of the Church of Jesus Christ of Latter Day Saints, which she re-established in the Utah Territory in 1866. She was also one of the plural wives of Joseph Smith and then later of Brigham Young after Smith's death. Eliza R. Snow was the older sister of Lorenzo Snow, the LDS Church's fifth president.

In the history of the Church of Jesus Christ of Latter-day Saints, she was a well-known and significant figure. Several Hymns authored by her are still widely sung today in LDS Sacrament Meetings: a notable example of which is the Hymn O My Father, which makes reference to teachings concerning a Pre-Mortal Existence and a Heavenly Mother.

== Early years and education ==
Eliza Roxey Snow was born in Becket, Massachusetts, the second of seven children (four daughters and three sons) to Oliver Snow III (1775–1845) and Rosetta Leonara Pettibone Snow (1778–1846). Her parents were of English descent and their ancestors were among the earliest settlers of New England. Although her middle name is a namesake from her paternal aunt Roxey Snow (1776–1817), her middle name is also frequently spelled as Roxcy. When she was two years old, her family left New England to settle on a new and fertile farm in the Western Reserve valley, in Mantua Township, Portage County, Ohio. The Snow family valued learning and saw that each child had educational opportunities.

Although a farmer by occupation, Oliver Snow performed much public business, officiating in several responsible positions. His daughter, Eliza, being ten years the senior of her eldest brother, was employed as secretary, as soon as she was competent, in her father's office as justice of the peace. She was skilled in various kinds of needlework and home manufactures. Two years in succession she drew the prize awarded by the committee on manufactures, at the county fair, for the best manufactured leghorn bonnet.

== Early church involvement ==
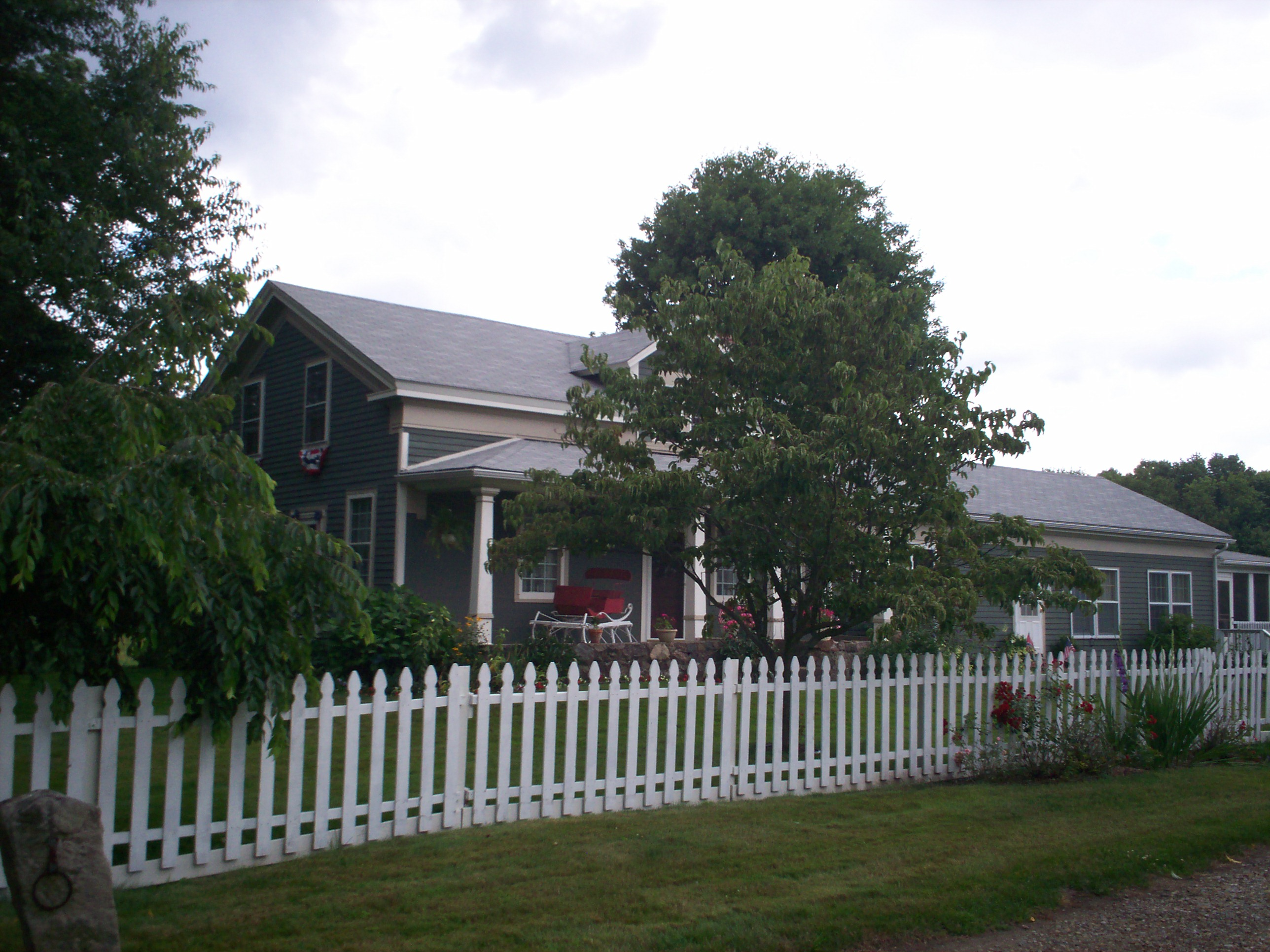
House in Mantua, Ohio where the Snow family lived from 1815 to 1838

Snow's Baptist parents welcomed a variety of religious believers into their home. In 1828, Snow and her parents joined Alexander Campbell's Christian restorationist movement, the Disciples of Christ. In 1831, when Joseph Smith, founder of the Latter Day Saint movement, took up residence in Hiram, Ohio, four miles from the family's farm, the Snow family took a strong interest in the new religious movement. Snow's mother and sister joined the Church of the Latter Day Saints early on. Several years later, in 1835, Snow was baptized and moved to Kirtland, Ohio, the church's headquarters. After arriving, Snow donated her inheritance, a large sum of money, toward building the church's Kirtland Temple. In appreciation, the building committee provided her with the title to "a very valuable [lot]-situated near the Temple, with a fruit tree-an excellent spring of water, and house that accommodated two families." Here, Snow taught school for Smith's family and was influential in interesting her younger brother, Lorenzo, in Mormonism. He later became an apostle and the LDS Church's fifth president.

Snow moved west with her family and the body of the church, first to Adam-ondi-Ahman, a short-lived settlement in Missouri, and then to Nauvoo, Illinois. In the 1930s, Alice Merrill Horne wrote in her autobiography that when she was a girl she overheard a conversation that in Missouri during the 1838 Mormon War, Eliza Snow was brutally gang-raped by eight Missourians, which left her unable to have children. Later, according to Horne, Joseph Smith offered her marriage as a plural wife "as a way of promising her that she would still have eternal offspring and that she would be a mother in Zion."

In Nauvoo, Snow again made her living as a schoolteacher. After Smith's death, Snow swore in an affidavit recorded by a notary public that she had secretly wed him on June 29, 1842, as a plural wife. However, Snow had organized a petition in that same summer of 1842, with a thousand female signatures, denying that Smith was connected with polygamy and extolling his virtue. As secretary of the Ladies' Relief Society, she organized the publishing of a certificate in October 1842 denouncing polygamy and denying Smith as its creator or participant. Decades later Snow publicly described Smith as, "my beloved husband, the choice of my heart and the crown of my life." Years later, when Snow was informed that Smith's first wife, Emma, had stated on her deathbed that her husband had never been a polygamist, Snow was reported to have stated she doubted the story but "If ... [this] was really [Sister Emma's] testimony she died with a libel on her lips -- a libel against her husband -- against his wives -- against the truth, and against God...".

After Smith's death, Snow married Brigham Young as a plural wife. She traveled west across the plains and arrived in the Salt Lake Valley on October 2, 1847. There, childless Eliza became a prominent member of Young's family, moving into an upper bedroom of Young's Salt Lake City residence, the Lion House.

== Relief Society service ==
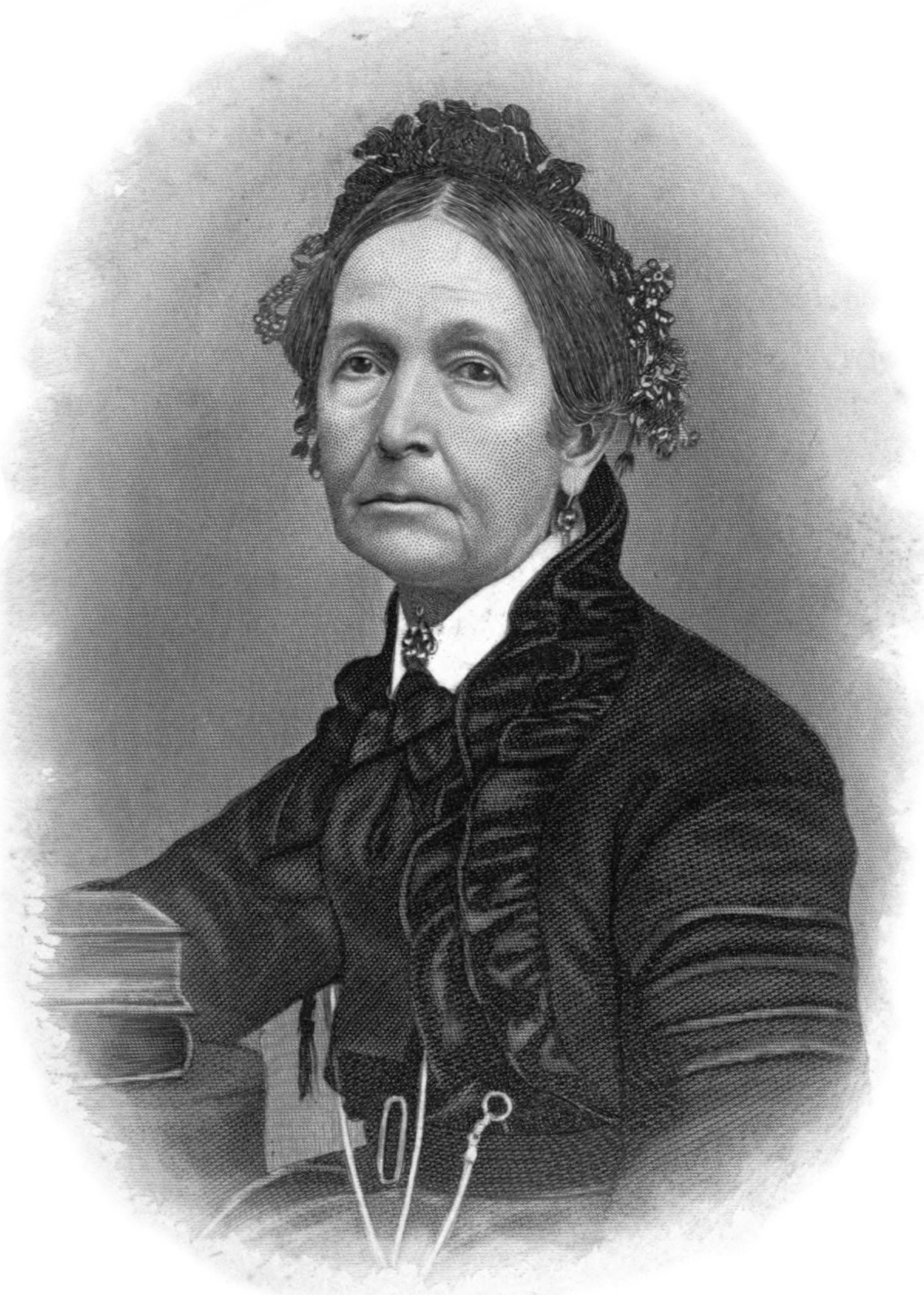
Engraving of Eliza Roxey Snow

The LDS Church's first Relief Society was organized by Joseph Smith in Nauvoo, Illinois on March 17, 1842, as a philanthropic and women's educational organization. Snow served as the organization's first secretary, with Smith's wife, Emma, as president. The organization was originally known as "The Female Relief Society of Nauvoo." It later became known simply as "The Relief Society." For the next three years, Snow kept copious notes of the organization's meetings, including Joseph Smith's teachings on how the organization should operate. Members of the original Relief Society stopped meeting shortly after Smith's death in 1844, and the organization soon became defunct.

Brigham Young led a migration of LDS Church members to the Salt Lake Valley in 1847, and for the next twenty years attempts were periodically made to reestablish the organization. In 1855, Young commissioned Snow with reestablishing the Relief Society. Until 1868, however, activity was limited, and no sustained, church-wide Relief Society existed. For the next several years, Snow traveled throughout the Utah Territory helping Latter-day Saint bishops again organize Relief Society in their local wards, using the notes she took as secretary in Nauvoo as the founding principles of the reestablished Relief Society. "What is the object of the Female Relief Society?" Snow wrote on one occasion. "I would reply—to do good—to bring into requisition every capacity we possess for doing good, not only in relieving the poor but in saving souls." Local Relief Societies soon fell under the umbrella of a church-wide, general Relief Society of which Snow served as president until 1887.

Snow's presidency emphasized spirituality and self-sufficiency. The Relief Society sent women to medical school, trained nurses, opened the Deseret Hospital, operated cooperative stores, promoted silk manufacture, saved wheat, and built granaries. In 1872, Snow provided assistance and advice to Louisa L. Greene in the creation of a woman's publication loosely affiliated with the Relief Society—the Woman's Exponent. Snow's responsibilities also extended to young women and children within the church. She was a primary organizer for the Young Ladies' Mutual Improvement Association in 1870 and assisted Aurelia Spencer Rogers in establishing the Primary Association in 1878.

In light of her combined responsibilities, Snow was sometimes simply known as the "president of the LDS women's organizations". Finally on June 19, 1880, church leaders established a separate complement of officers for the Relief Society, YLMIA, and Primary. For the church as a whole, each organization now had a president with two counselors, eventually supported by a board as well, similar to the structures most wards had adopted. Snow's chosen counselors were Zina D. H. Young and Elizabeth Ann Whitney, and she continued to serve as the Relief Society president until her death in 1887. By 1888, the Relief Society had more than 22,000 members in 400 local congregations.

Snow died in Salt Lake City and was buried in Brigham Young's family cemetery.

Snow's grave in Mormon Pioneer Memorial Monument, near that of Brigham Young

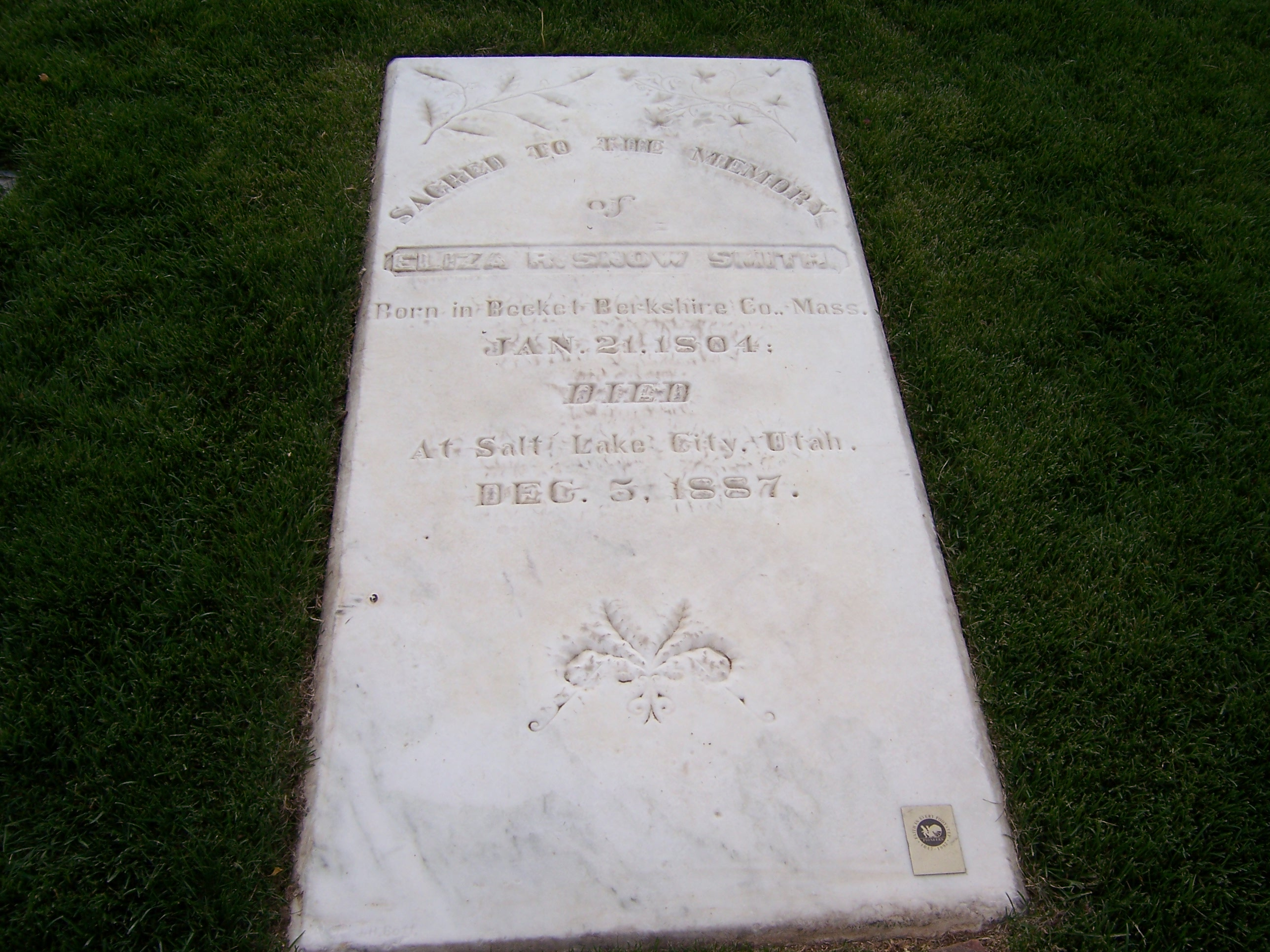
Grave

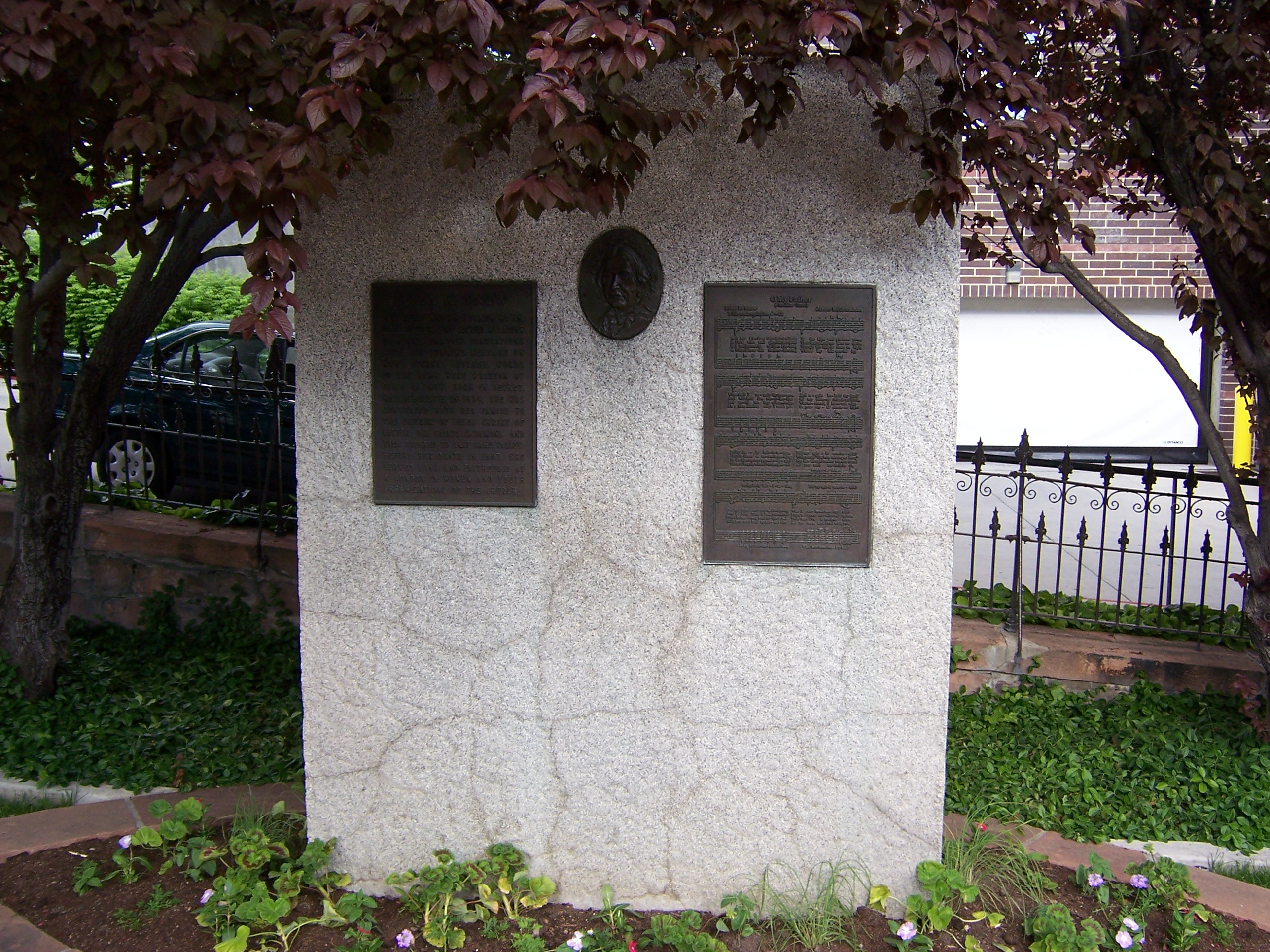
Monument

== Poetry ==
Snow wrote poetry from a young age, one time even writing school lessons in rhyme. Between 1826 and 1832, she published more than 20 poems in local newspapers, including the Western Courier of Ravenna, Ohio, and the Ohio Star under pen names such as Narcissa and Tullia. Her first published poem was a requiem she was requested to write for John Adams and Thomas Jefferson, in light of their simultaneous deaths July 4, 1826. A number of Snow's poems were set to music and have become important Latter-day Saint hymns, some of which appear in the current edition of the Church's hymnal. One of her hymns, "Great is the Lord", was published in the first Latter Day Saint hymnal in 1835, the year of her baptism.

In Nauvoo, Snow gained minor distinction as a Mormon poet featured in local newspapers. She continued to write poems as she journeyed to the Salt Lake Valley, documenting the pioneer trail and life in Utah, and in 1850 she penned a humorous riposte regarding visiting United States officials who had not impressed the Saints. where she would rise to prominence, being called "Zion's Poetess." The first of her two volumes of Poems, Religious, Historical, and Political appeared in 1856, followed by the second in 1877. Some of her poems are:

- "How Great the Wisdom and the Love"
- "Invocation, or the Eternal Father and Mother" [retitled "O My Father"]
- "Be Not Discouraged"
- "My First View of a Western Prairie"
- "Mental Gas"
- "Think not When You Gather to Zion Your Troubles and Trials are Through"
- "O Awake! My Slumbering Minstrel"

One of her best-known poems, "Invocation, or the Eternal Father and Mother," was written soon after the death of her father and just over a year after the death of Joseph Smith. The poem, renamed "O My Father" after the first line, is included in the LDS Church's current hymnal, as are Snow's hymns "Great is the Lord"; "Again We Meet Around the Board"; "Awake, Ye Saints of God, Awake!"; "How Great the Wisdom and the Love"; "The Time Is Far Spent"; "In Our Lovely Deseret"; "Though Deepening Trials"; "Behold the Great Redeemer Die"; and "Truth Reflects Upon Our Senses".

Eliza Snow and her brother, Lorenzo Snow, founded the Polysophical Society in December 1854 in Salt Lake City. Members shared poetry and musical and dramatic performances. Church leaders Jedediah M. Grant and Heber C. Kimball halted the society's activities because of its "adulterous spirit."

== Image gallery ==
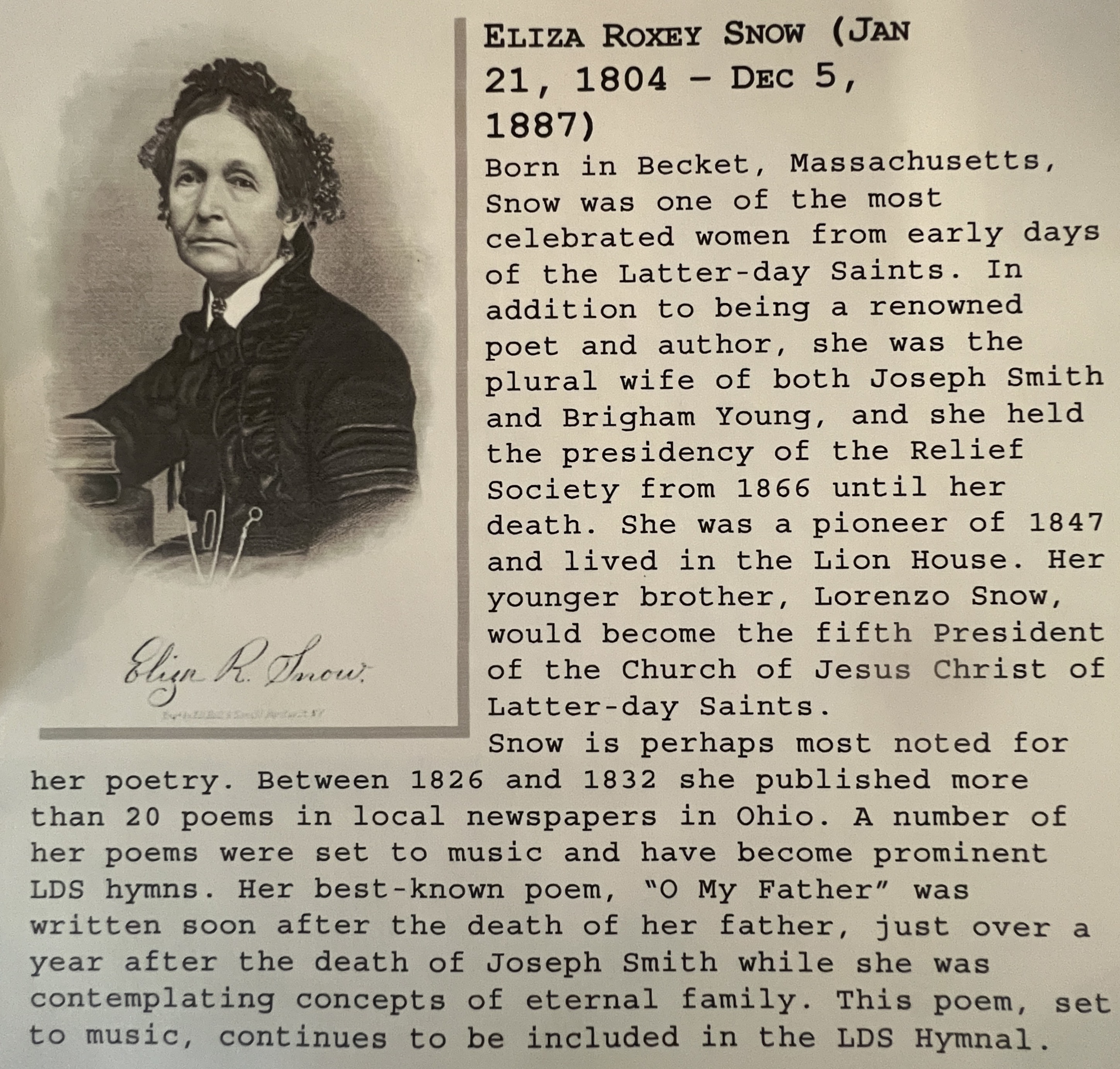
Snow's biographical sketch at the Pioneer Memorial Museum (PMM)

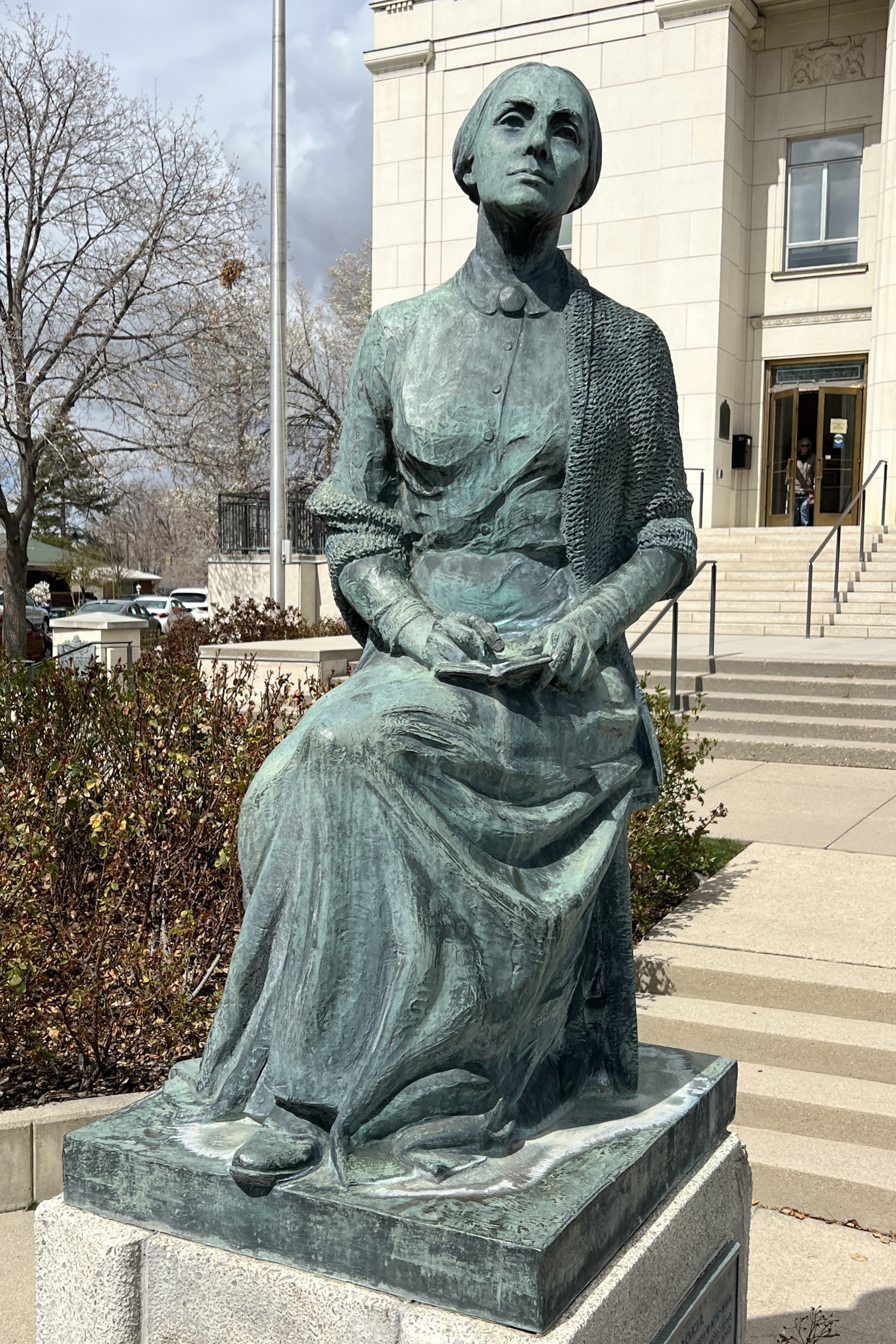
Snow (by Ortho R. Fairbanks; 1952) in front of the PMM

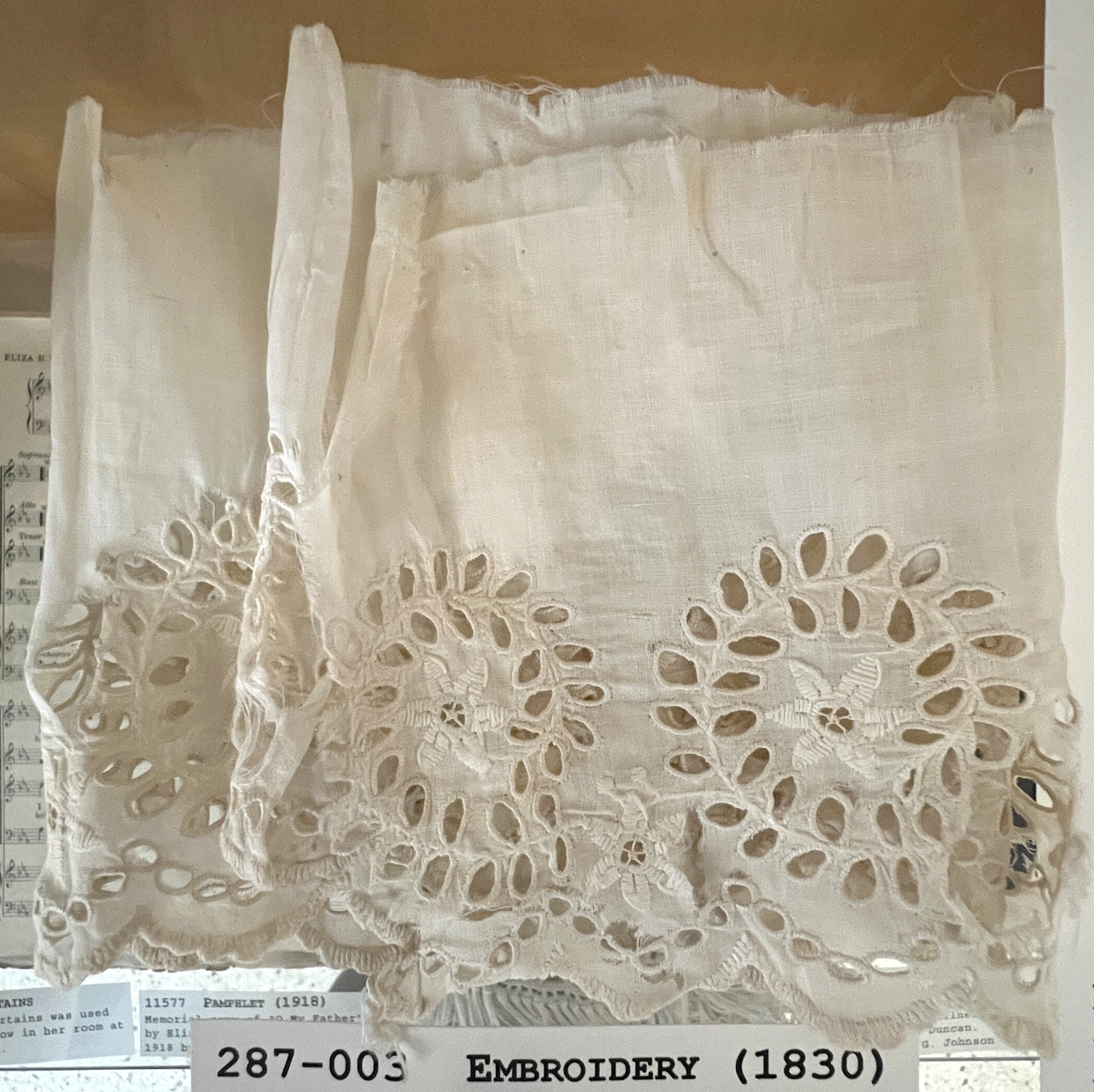
Snow's embroidery (1830) in the PMM

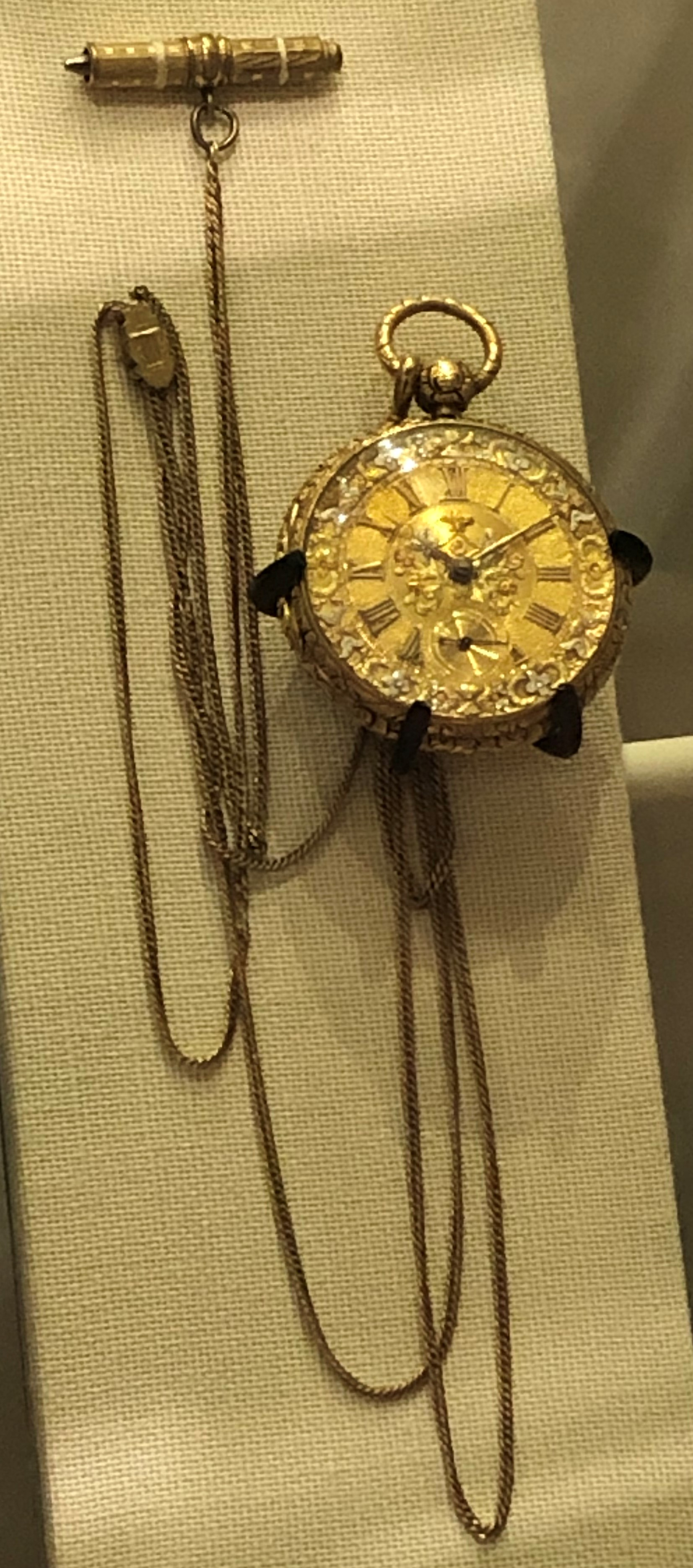
Snow's pocket watch from Joseph Smith, located in the Church History Museum

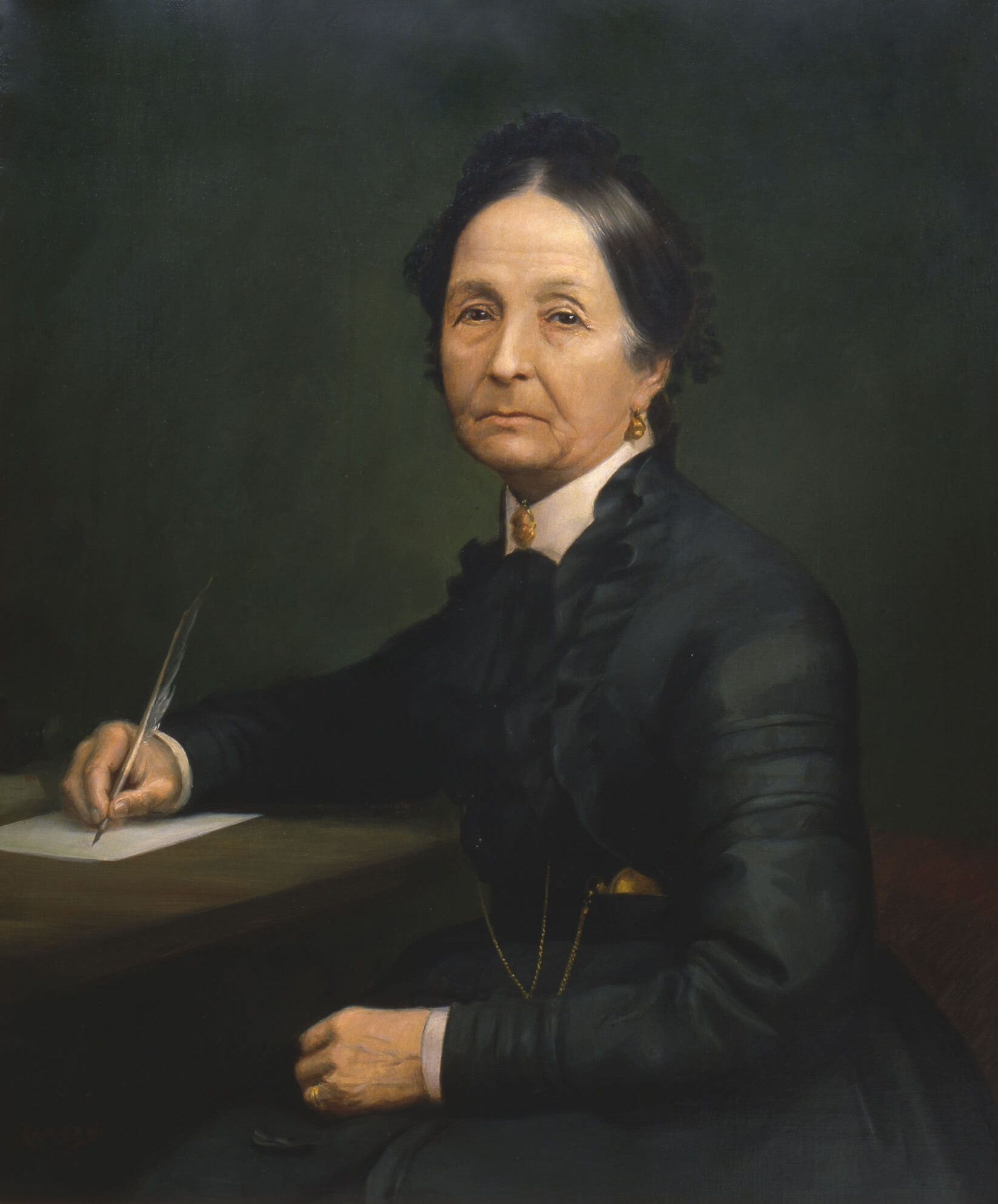
Snow (by Lewis Aquilla Ramsey; 1909)

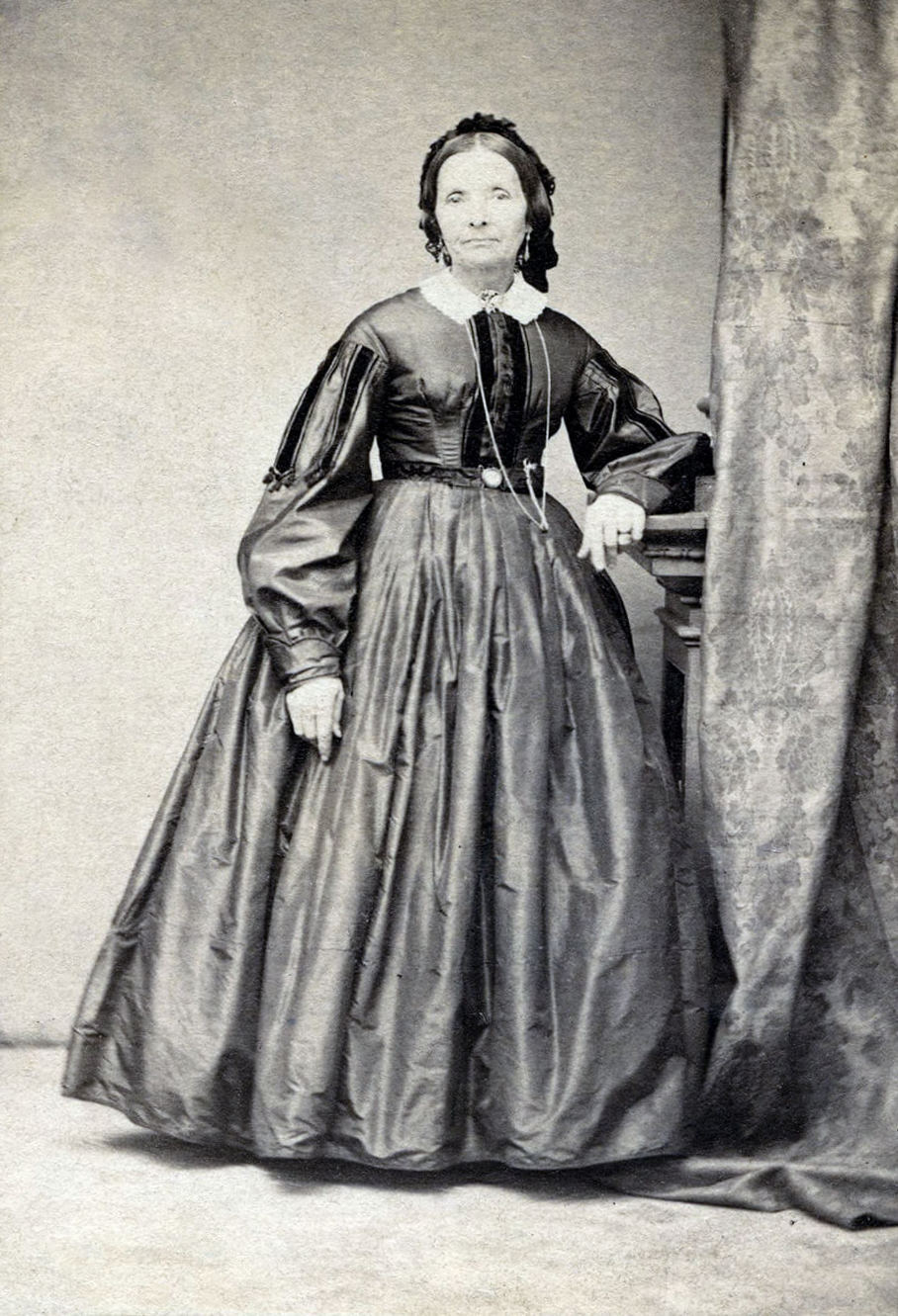
Snow (by Charles Roscoe Savage & George Martin Ottinger)

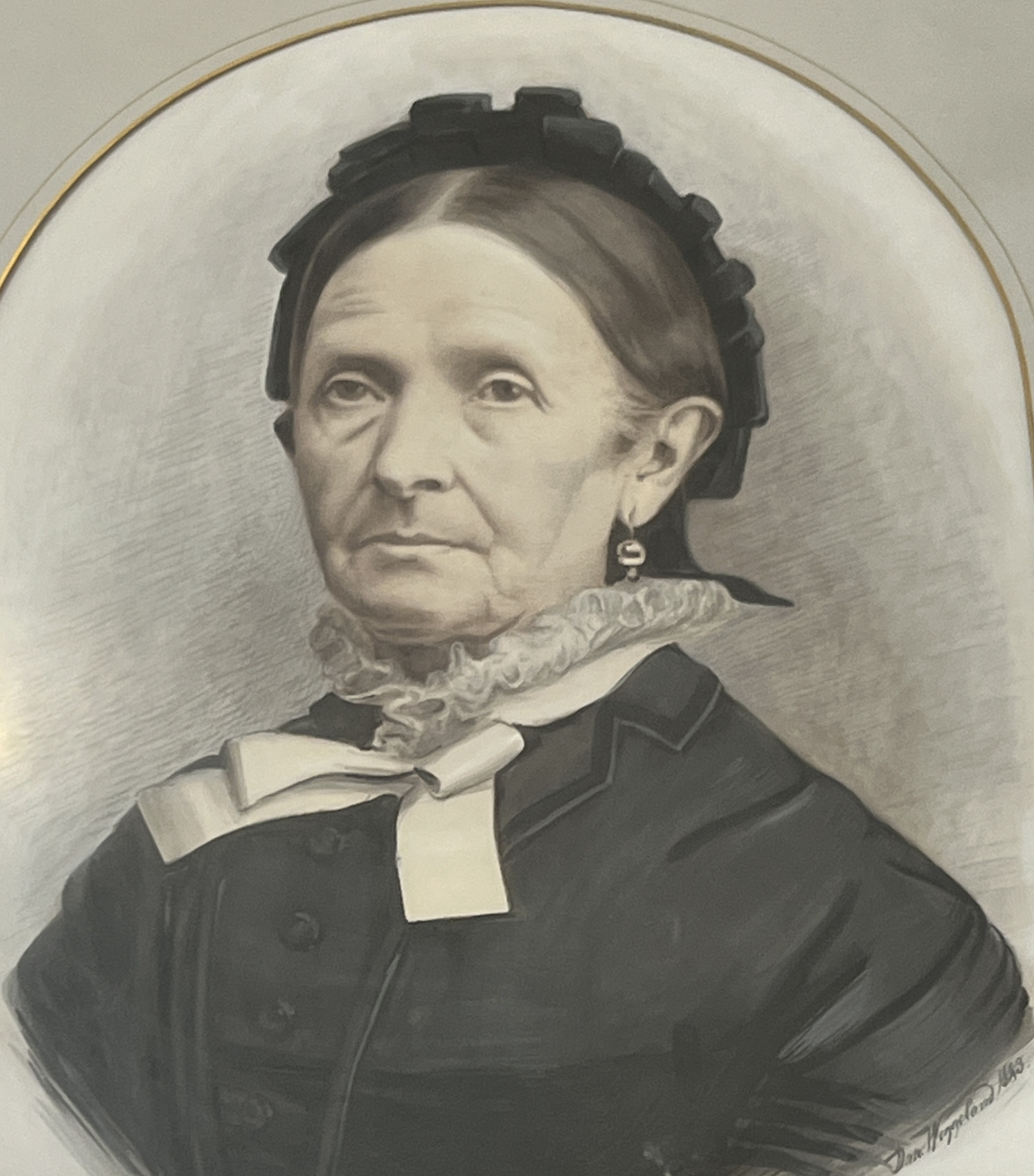
Snow (by Danquart Anthon Weggeland; 1883) in the PMM

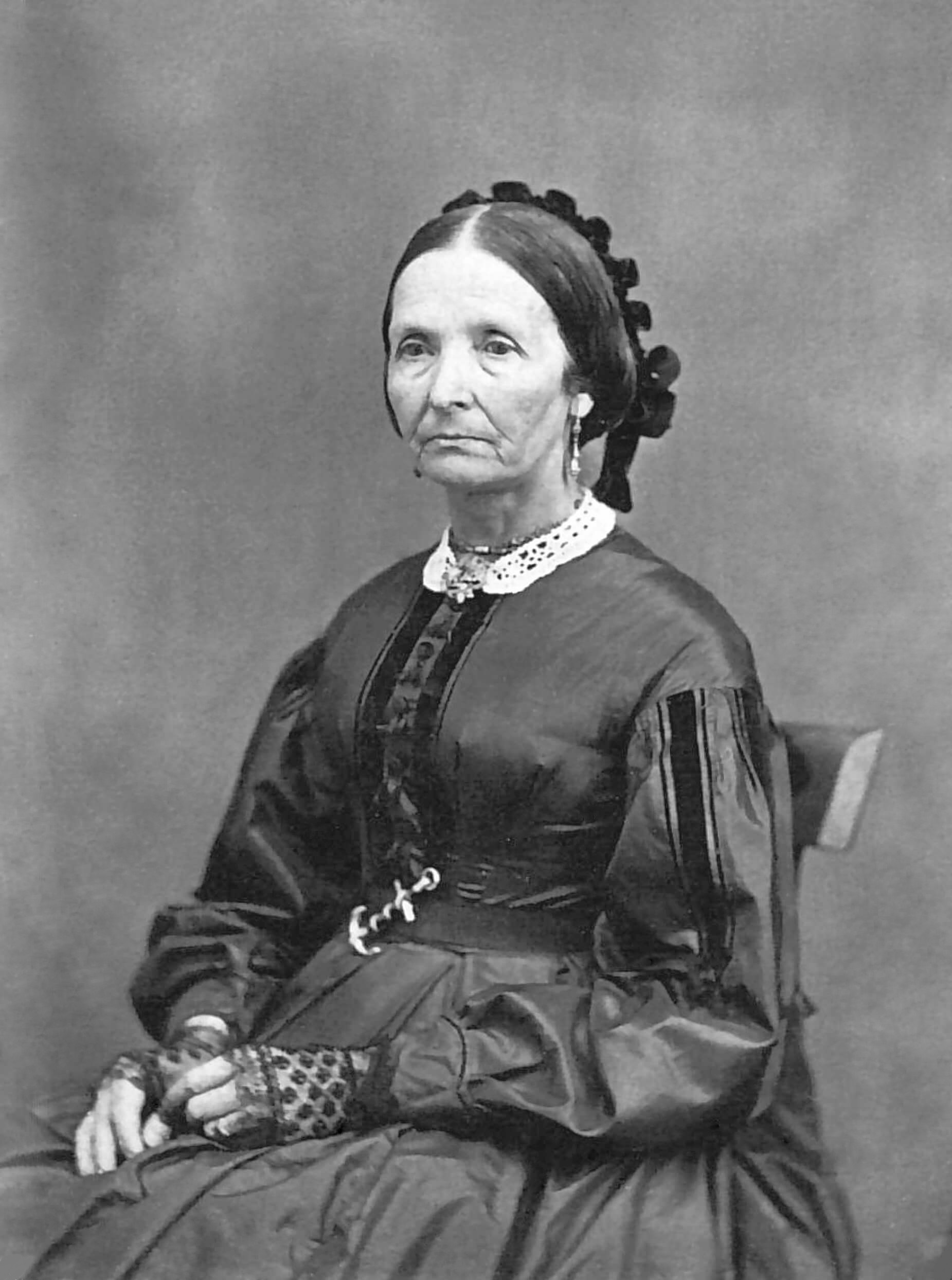
Snow (by Edward Martin)

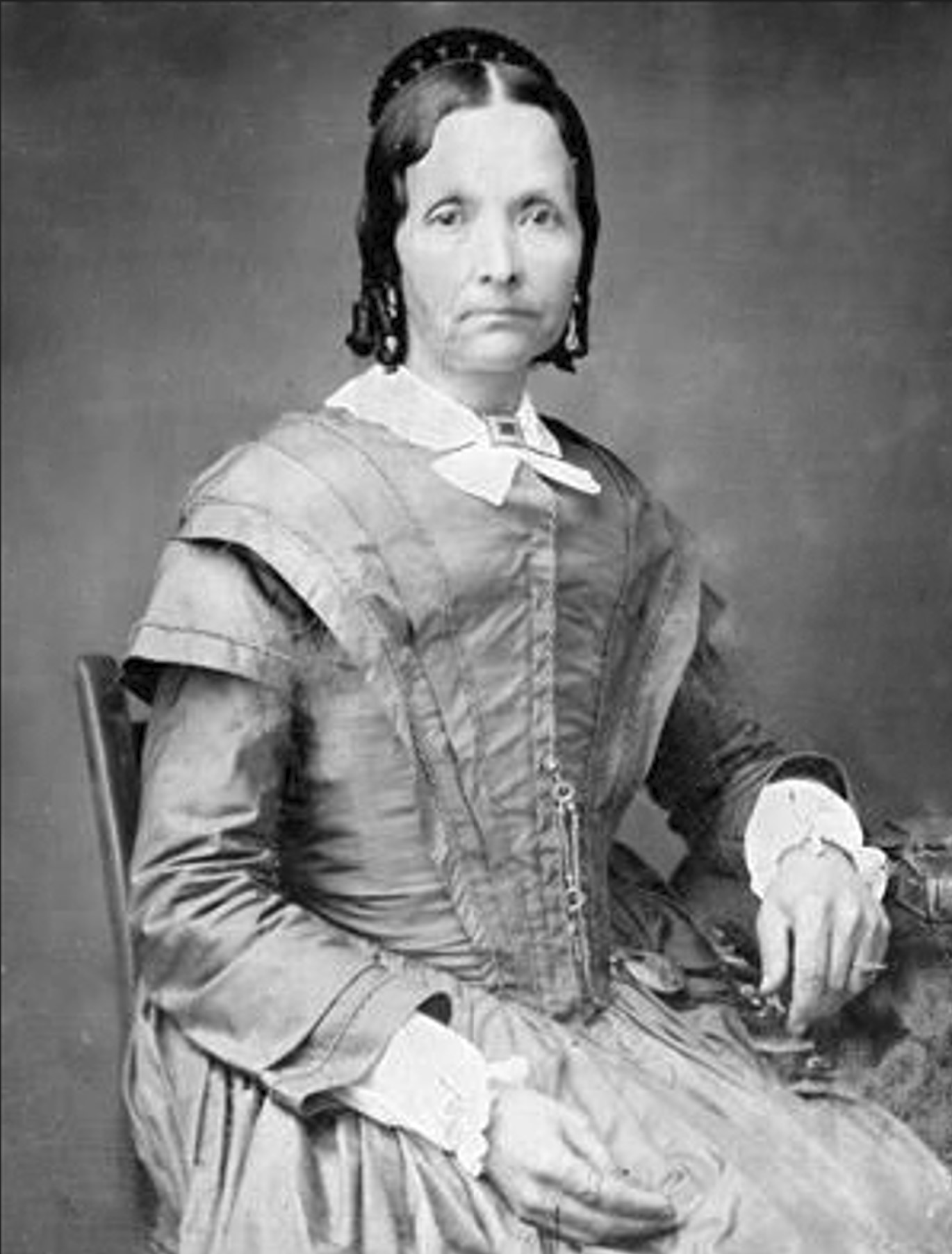
Snow (by Marsena Cannon; 1852)

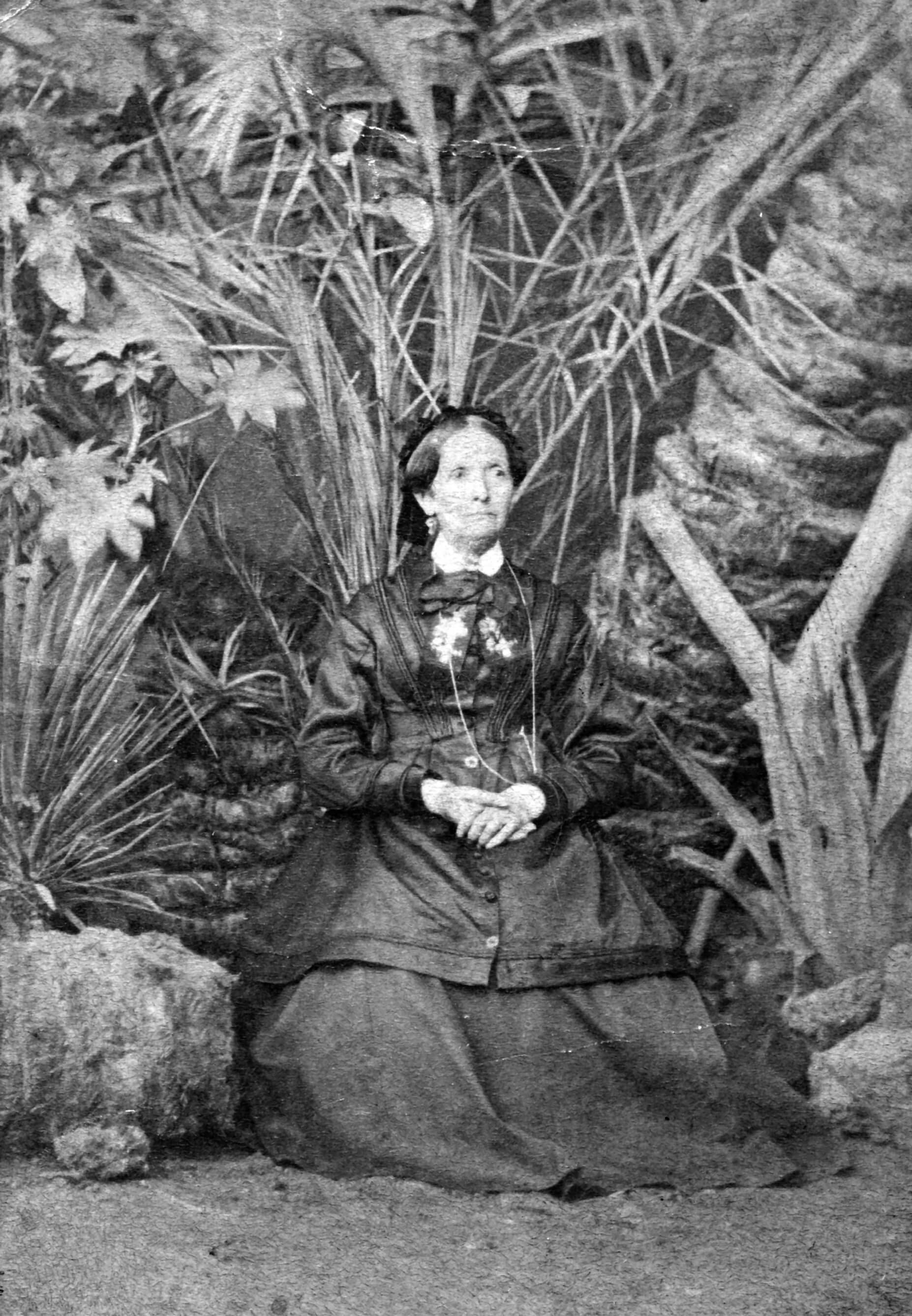
Snow (by Hippolyte Délié & Emile Béchard; 1873)

== Publications ==
- Snow, Eliza R. (1856). Poems: Religious, Historical and Political, Volume 1. Liverpool: F.D. Richards. OCLC 6549748.
- Smith, George A.; Snow, Lorenzo; Schettler, Paul A.; Snow, Eliza R. (1875). Correspondence of Palestine Tourists: Comprising a Series of Letters by George A. Smith, Lorenzo Snow, Paul A. Schettler, and Eliza R. Snow, of Utah: Mostly Written While Traveling in Europe, Asia and Africa in the Years 1872 and 1873. Salt Lake City: Deseret News Steam Printing Establishment. OCLC 85796473.
- Snow, Eliza R. (1877). Poems: Religious, Historical and Political, Volume 2. Salt Lake City: The Latter-day Saints Printing and Publishing Establishment. OCLC 6549777.
- —— (1880). Hymns and Songs: Selected From Various Authors, for the Primary Associations of the Children of Zion. Salt Lake City: Deseret News. OCLC 5330531.
- —— (1880). Children's Primary Tune Book. Salt Lake City: Juvenile Instructor Office.
- —— (1881). Bible Questions and Answers for Children. Salt Lake City: Juvenile Instructor Office. OCLC 228702929.
- —— (1884). Biography and Family Record of Lorenzo Snow, One of the Twelve Apostles of the Church of Jesus Christ of Latter-day Saints. Salt Lake City: Deseret News. OCLC 4623484.

Articles

- "The Mother of Mothers in Israel". Relief Society Magazine. 3 (4): 183–190. April 1916.

Poems

- "My Epitaph". Relief Society Magazine. 3 (4): 181. April 1916.
- "Zion Prospers, All is Well". Relief Society Magazine. 3 (4): 190. April 1916.
- "A Tribute to the Birthday of the Prophet Joseph Smith". Relief Society Magazine. 4 (12): 663–665. December 1917.
- "Apostrophe to Jerusalem". Relief Society Magazine. 5 (8): 439–441. August 1918.
- "The Year Has Gone". Relief Society Magazine. 12 (1): 1. January 1925.

=== Books ===
- Snow Smith, Eliza R. (1856). Poems: Religious, Historical, and Political Vol. 1. London: Latter-day Saints Book Depôt – via The Internet Archive.
- Smith Snow, Eliza R. (1877). Poems, religious, historical, and political. Also two articles in prose. London: The Latter-day Saints Printing and Publishing Establishment – via The Internet Archive.
- Snow, Eliza R. (1995). Beecher, Maureen Ursenbach (ed.). The Personal Writings of Eliza Roxcy Snow. Salt Lake City: University of Utah Press. ISBN 0874804779. OCLC 32241408.
- —— (2009). Derr, Jill Mulvay; Davidson, Karen Lynn (eds.). Eliza R. Snow: the complete poetry. Provo and Salt Lake City: Brigham Young University Press and University of Utah Press. ISBN 9780842527378. OCLC 320697542.

== See also ==
- Eliza R. Snow Performing Arts Center
- LDS fiction
- Mormon feminism
- Statue of Eliza R. Snow

The Church of Jesus Christ of Latter-day Saints titles
| Preceded by Emma Hale Smith | Relief Society General President; December 1866 – December 5, 1887 | Succeeded by Zina D. H. Young |
