= Statue of Eliza R. Snow =

Statue in Salt Lake City, Utah, U.S.

Statue of Eliza Roxey Snow
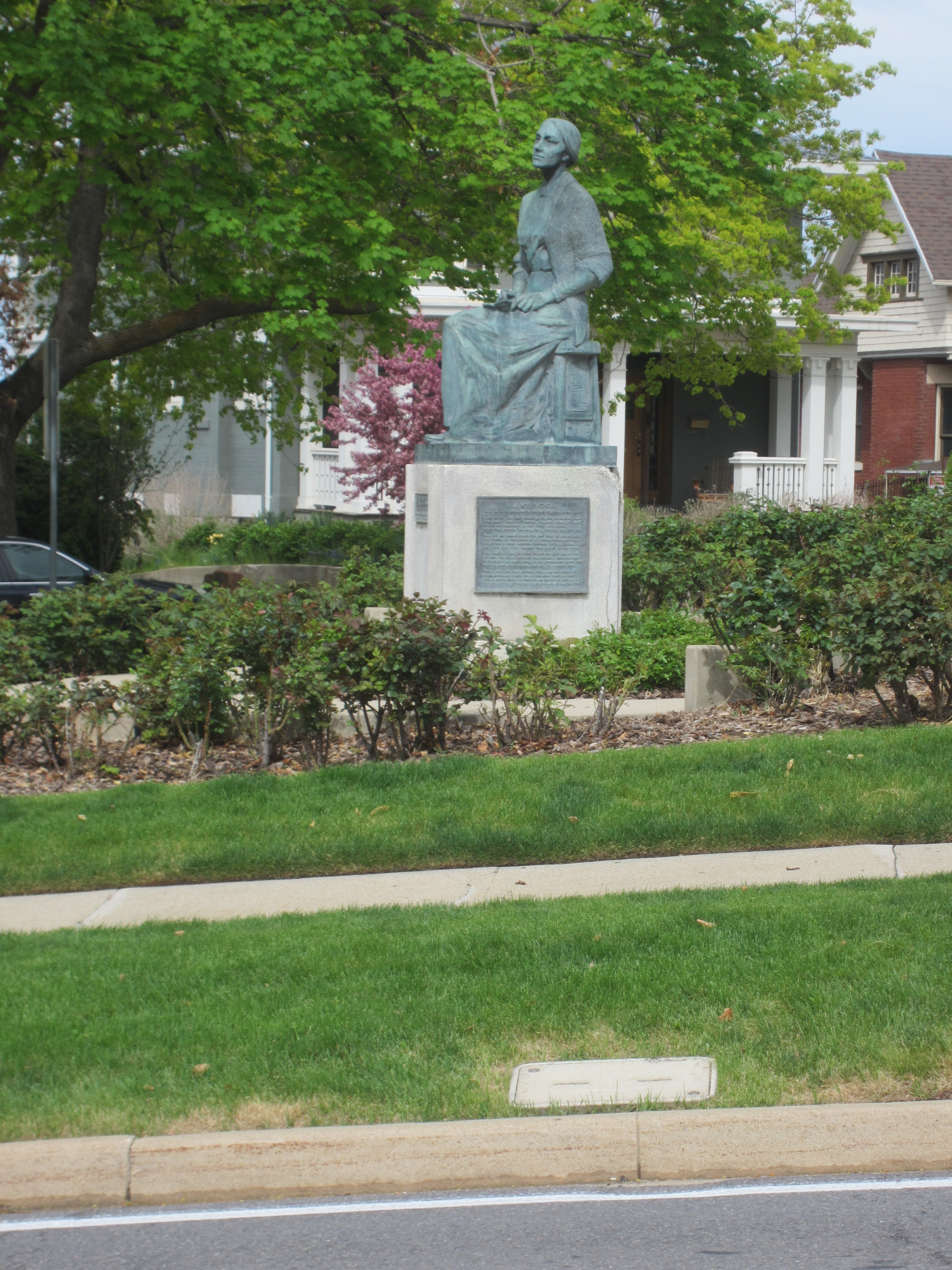
- The statue in 2021
- Artist: Ortho R. Fairbanks
- Year: 1952
- Subject: Eliza R. Snow
- Location: Salt Lake City, Utah, U.S.; 40°46′34.8″N 111°53′28.1″W

A bronze statue of Eliza Roxey Snow is installed in front of the Pioneer Memorial Museum in Salt Lake City, Utah. The artwork commemorates pioneer women. The statue was sculpted by Mormon artist Ortho Rollin Fairbanks in 1952.

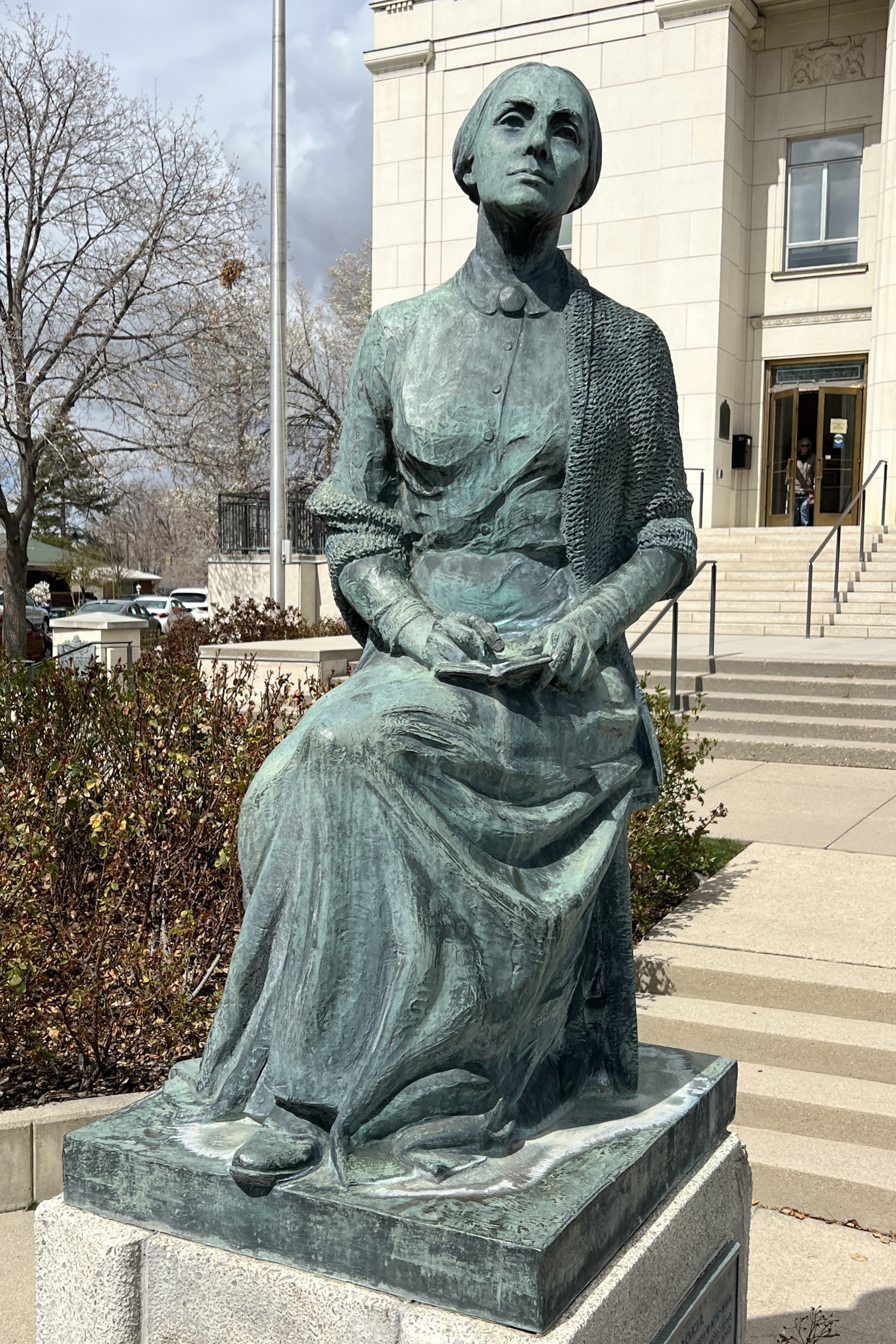
The statue in 2024
