= Eagle Gate =

Monument Salt Lake City, Utah, U.S.

Coordinates: 40°46′10.56″N 111°53′17.73″W

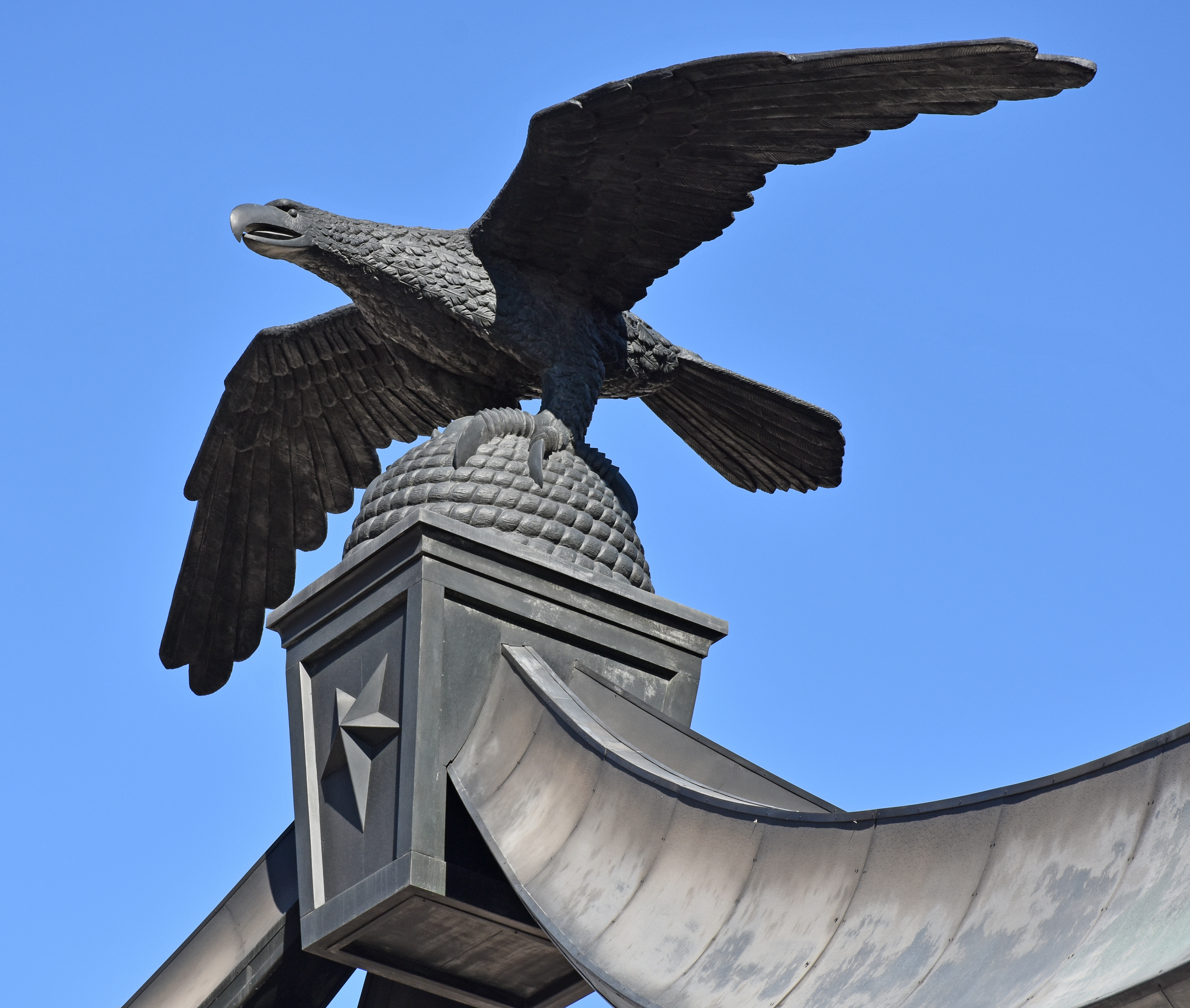
- Eagle sculpture atop the monument
- Interactive map of Eagle Gate
- Location: Salt Lake City, Utah, U.S.
- Designer: George Cannon Young
- Type: Arch with sculpture
- Completion date: 1963

The Eagle Gate is a historical monument which forms an arch across State Street in the downtown area of Salt Lake City, Utah. The monument pays homage to Brigham Young's 1859 Eagle Gate, which served as an entrance to his property and the City Creek Canyon road. After the road was publicly opened and the gates removed, the arch, with its perched eagle and beehive sculpture, remained over the street. Since then, the structure has been rebuilt twice; once in the 1890s and again in the 1960s.

The monument is one of Salt Lake City's best-known pioneer landmarks, and its current form is one of the city's finest examples of mid-century modern design. As a popular symbol of the city, a number of local businesses and structures have been named after the landmark, including the former Eagle Gate Plaza and Tower.

== Design ==
The monument forms an arch over State Street at its intersection with South Temple street. The arches, supported by four pillars on the east and west sides of the road come together at the keystone, which is decorated with five-point stars. Sitting atop the keystone is a sculpture of an eagle perched on a beehive. The sculpture, created in the early 1960s and based on the 1859 original, has a wing span of 20 feet (6.1 m), is 10 feet (3.0 m) long, and stands 5 feet 4 inches (1.63 m) tall; it weighs 4,000 pounds (1,800 kg) and its bronze alloy consists of 88% copper, 6.74% zinc, 1.45% lead and 3.8% tin.

The beehive has been a common symbol of Utah since the Mormon pioneer period. When the area was settled by these pioneers in the 1840s, they wanted to call their state Deseret, a word which means honeybee in the Book of Mormon. And while the state was eventually named Utah, bees and beehives, as they relate to the themes of industry, thrift and perseverance, remained a common symbol of Utah. Today the state's emblem is the beehive and it carries the nickname "The Beehive State."

On the sidewalk between the two east pillars is a large granite stone, containing a time capsule. A plaque telling the history of the Eagle Gate is atop this large stone. The arches and pillars are constructed of a steel frame, covered in metal panels (which come together in a three-point shape).

== History ==
=== 1850s gate ===
In 1850, Brigham Young—president of the Church of Jesus Christ of Latter-day Saints (LDS Church) and later, first governor of Utah Territory—was granted control of City Creek Canyon by the General Assembly of the provisional State of Deseret. As Young's downtown estate developed, he had a 8-to-9-foot-high (2.4 to 2.7 m) wall built encircling his property, and where the road leading to the canyon passed through, a gate was built. This gate provided a public entrance to Young's property and helped solidify his control of the canyon, the use of which required the payment of tolls. (Note: Tolls were not collected at the Eagle Gate, but at a location further north along the road.) At one period, the toll for hauled wood was paid by providing every fifth load to Young.

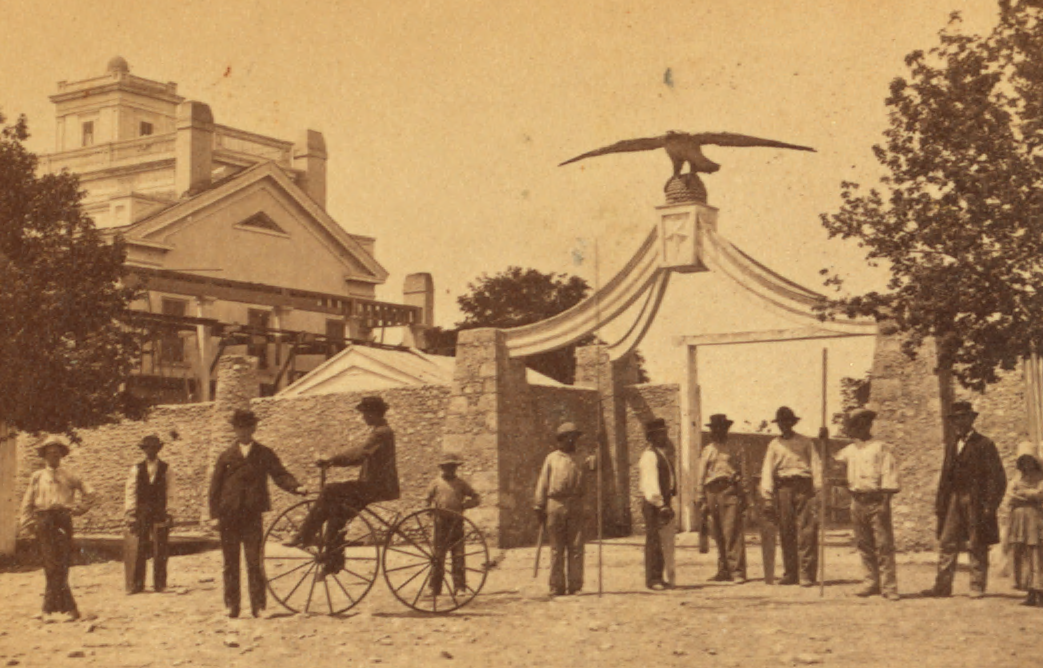
The original Eagle Gate, with Young's Beehive House in the background

On February 17, 1859, a wooden sculpture of an eagle perched atop a beehive was placed on arches above the gate, thus giving the entrance its name. The sculpture was carved by Ralph Ramsay, possibly with the assistance of his boss, William Bell. (Note: Ramsay claimed to have carved the eagle himself, but nevertheless controversy has surrounded whether Bell may have also provided some of the work.) The sculpture was carved from five blocks of wood; one used for the body, one for the neck and head, two for the wings, and the fifth was used for the beehive. The five blocks were joined together using pieces of iron. The eagle's wings measured 16 feet (4.9 m) from tip to tip and the sculpture's weight was 500 pounds (230 kg). Tradition holds that Truman O. Angell, the church's architect, killed an eagle at the mouth of City Creek Canyon, which became the model for the sculpture. The gate was 22 feet (6.7 m) wide, allowing two wagons to pass each other, and was designed by Hiram B. Clawson, likely with help from Angell.

The high walls created complications for Young's children's social lives when the gate was locked nightly. The children and their friends later remembered climbing over the walls, or passing through the office gate and risking their tardiness being reported to their father by the watchman. Young died in August 1877, and the following year the city removed the walls on either side of the gate and between the pillars, while preserving the pillars, arch and sculpture, allowing the street to handle more traffic. Some citizens thought leaving the monument in the road a bad idea, with suggestions being given to move it to Ensign Peak.

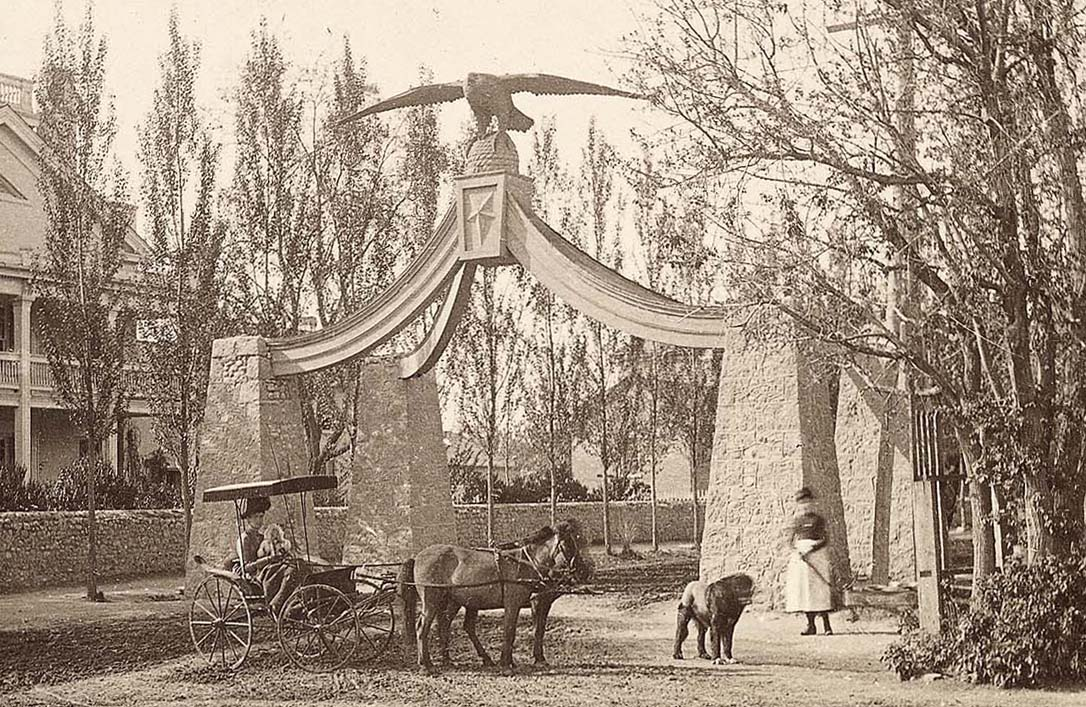
The original Eagle Gate after the gates were removed and the street opened

In June 1890, the Salt Lake Railroad Company built tracks running through the archway and up the street, as part of their electric streetcar system. A rival streetcar business, the Rapid Transit Company, was also granted rights to run their tracks along the same stretch of road. A few days after the Salt Lake Railroad Company had laid their track, workmen from the Rapid Transit Company began tearing it up (wanting to replace it with their own rails, as the gate was too narrow for more than one set of tracks) until the marshal intervened and stopped the destruction. The two companies then agreed to share a single track through the gate and to add height to the pillars, raising the arches and sculpture higher so as to not interfere with the overhead electric wires.

While attempting to raise the pillars, it was discovered the wooden arches had badly rotted and the streetcar companies reported they only had two options, remove the landmark or rebuild it entirely (and they would not bear the entire cost for a rebuild). As talk of demolishing the landmark, widening the road, and moving the eagle sculpture to Liberty Park or the Brigham Young Cemetery progressed, many citizens and community groups protested its removal. As such the city council voted in September 1890 that the landmark would remain. Because a rebuild would still be required to increase the gate's height and width, the 1850s gate was demolished that December.

=== 1890s monument ===
In May 1891, the road beneath the gate, then known as "First East Street," was officially renamed "State Street." During summer 1891, the contract for reconstructing the monument was awarded at a cost of $2,500 (equivalent to $87,491 in 2024), with both streetcar companies contributing funds. The foundation was started in August, and pillars, of carved granite stone, began going up shortly after. The new gate was designed by Don Carlos Young, son of Brigham Young. A ceremony was held on October 5, 1891, when a time capsule containing local newspapers, photographs and a copper plate with an inscribed history of the gate were placed in the southeast pillar.

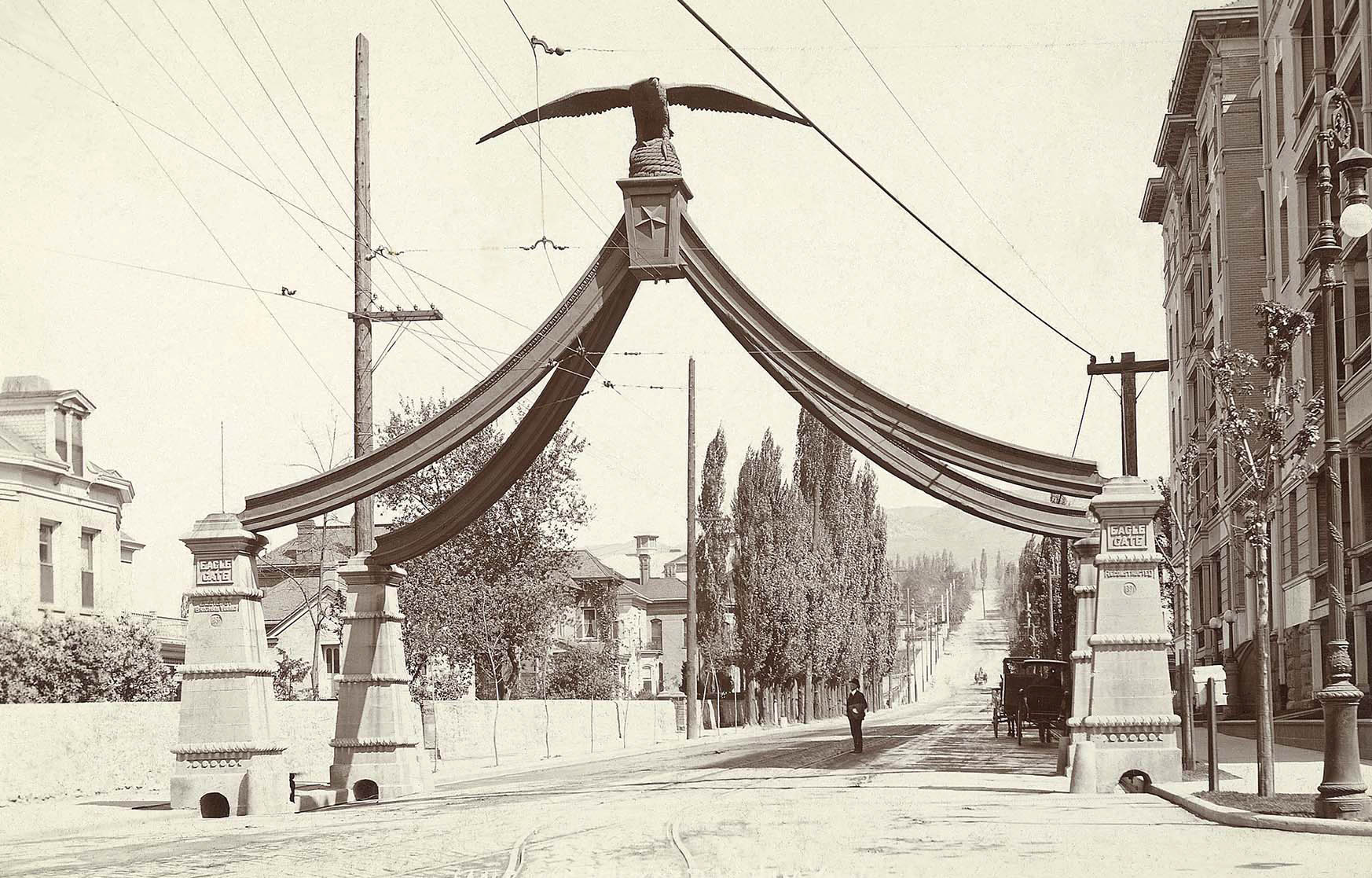
The 1890s rebuild of the Eagle Gate

Among the dignitaries at the ceremony were Joseph F. Smith, Francis M. Lyman, Heber J. Grant, and George Q. Cannon, who placed the time capsule in the pillar. Also present was designer of the original gate, Hiram B. Clawson and his son, Spencer Clawson (who chaired the committee in charge of the new gate). Early the following year, the eagle sculpture was taken apart and shipped to Chicago to receive a copper coating. After being electroplated, the sculpture was lifted atop the new monument in August 1892.

Throughout its history, this gate was improved with electric lights and the eagle's metal coating was refurbished many times, including a significant project in 1947 for the centennial celebration of the Mormon pioneer arrival.

In June 1934, the Utah Pioneer Trails and Landmarks Association (UPTLA) added a historic marker to the monument. At the same time, a second marker was placed on a wall of the neighboring Bransford apartments, to mark the site of Young's estate schoolhouse which had stood just inside the Eagle Gate.

==== Widening discussions ====
The narrowness of the gate, and its proximity to major roads, led to accidents. In 1907, Emily Wells, the wife of Heber Manning Wells, Utah's first governor, was severely injured when a car she was riding in struck the southwest pillar. She was thrown against the column and the injury resulted in an amputation of her leg. In 1910, the city was attempting to move a barn up the street towards City Creek Canyon, when it got stuck under the gate. The Salt Lake Herald-Republican reported the damage done to the gate cost more than the barn was worth.

There were a number conversations had about widening State Street during the late 19th and early 20th centuries, with a serious discussion on the topic taking place in 1936. The widening of the street would require rebuilding or removing the monument and was met with opposition from groups such as the Daughters of Utah Pioneers (DUP) and Sons of Utah Pioneers (SUP), and the project died for the year. In 1938, the streetcar company announced they would be removing the rails running under the monument, and not long after, the local Lions Club began pressing to have the road widened. Again a number of local groups protested the widening due the required changes that would be made to the historic monument, including the First Presidency of the LDS Church. Following the community feedback, the city commissioners rejected the widening of the street. This action effectively ended the project, as the city's permission would have been necessary for it to go forward.

By the mid-1950s, local newspapers were again reporting on state attempts to wide State Street, this time with support from LDS Church leadership. Planning continued into the early 1960s, with the LDS Church eventually agreeing to provide the necessary property on the west side of the street (for road expansion) to the state for no cost, in return for the state bearing the cost of rebuilding the Eagle Gate and also moving a historic rock wall between the Beehive House and State Street. Similar to earlier attempts to widen the road, there was some opposition to the plan because of the changes it would mean to the Eagle Gate.

Just weeks after final details of project were released, on April 18, 1960, the Eagle Gate was badly damaged in a traffic mishap. A truck, pulling a trailer carrying a bulldozer, was passing under the monument when the blade of the bulldozer caught an arch, pulling it and a neighboring arch off their pillars. The driver of the truck stated he was traveling in the inner lane (which had more clearance), but a car forced his truck into the outer lane. The truck and bulldozer belonged to the Alfred Brown Construction Company, which had been doing work at the nearby Utah State Capitol. Following the accident, engineers choose to take down the eagle sculpture and arches, citing safety and the upcoming rebuild.

During March 1961, in preparation for the new Eagle Gate monument and State Street widening, the historic Brigham Young cobblestone wall between the Beehive House and the street was moved 23 feet (7.0 m) to the west, as the state had agreed to do. The stone pillars that had once supported the Eagle Gate were also removed from both sides of the road and taken to the road commission shops, where employees began a search for the 1891 time capsule. After being discovered, the time capsule was opened by the LDS Church's First Presidency. Inside were the photographs by Charles Roscoe Savage, although they had been damaged by moisture and crumpled as they were unwrapped. Several newspapers were also found, as was the copper plaque bearing the history of the gate.

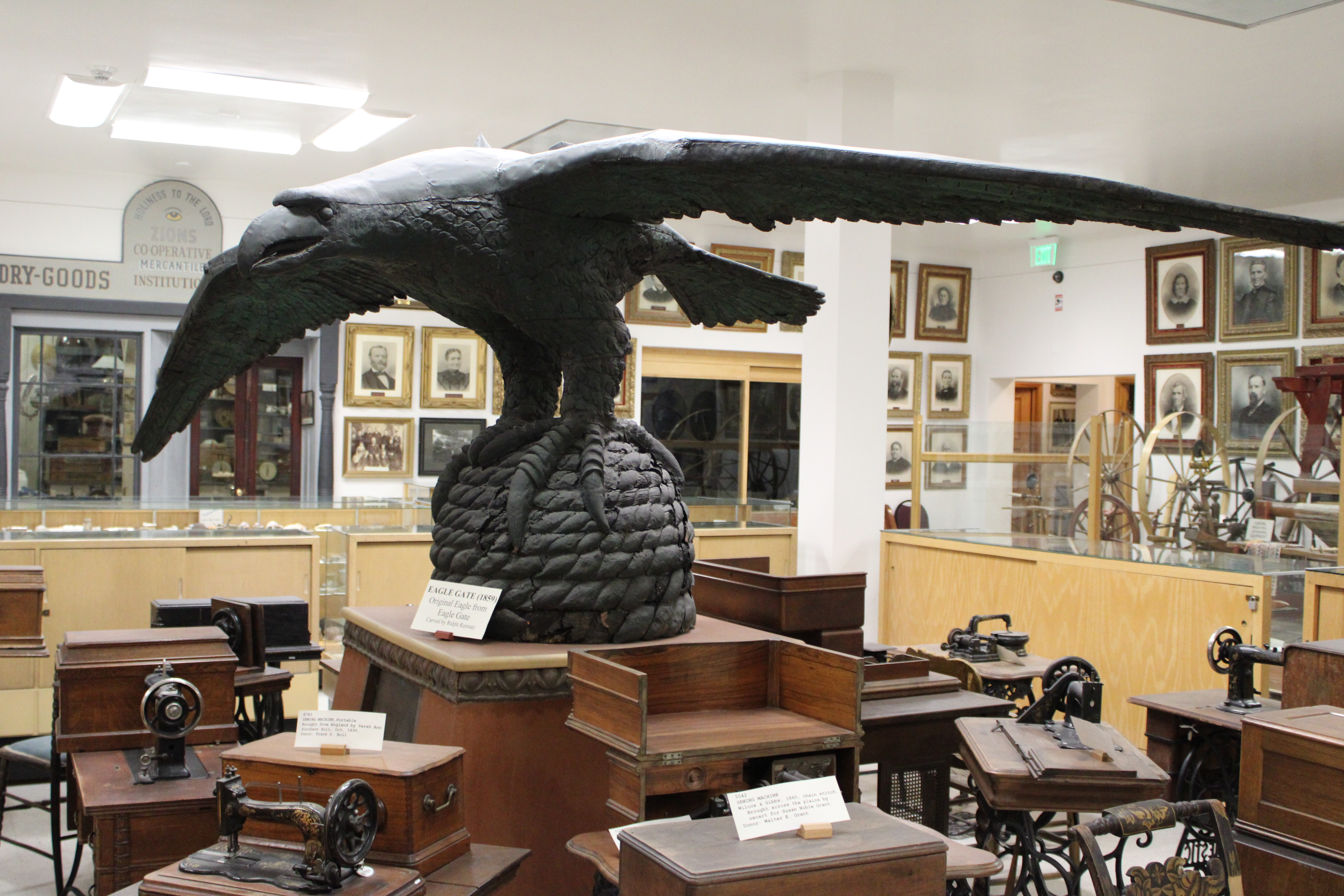
The original 1859 eagle sculpture, as preserved in the DUP's Pioneer Memorial Museum

In September 1960, the eagle sculpture was placed in the DUP's Pioneer Memorial Museum, pending a decision to reuse it or create an entirely new sculpture for the new monument. The eagle eventually became a permanent part of the DUP's collection.

=== 1960s monument ===
After the 1890s monument was damaged, the state road commission hired George Cannon Young (son of Don Carlos Young and grandson of Brigham Young), who was also working on the neighboring restoration of the Beehive House, as architect for a new Eagle Gate. The design of the new monument was approved by the state and LDS Church leaders in February 1961; included in the design was a wider archway of 75 feet (23 m) versus the 40 feet (12 m) span of the previous monument. The Sons of Utah Pioneers organization was dissatisfied with the design of the new monument, claiming it was too modern and had a spider-like look.

Grant R. Fairbanks, a son of sculptor Avard Fairbanks, assisted by his brothers Justin and David, would create the new eagle sculpture for the monument. Early discussions centered around whether to create an enlarged replica of original 1859 eagle, which some claimed had more vulture-like features, or if an entirely new design, with a truer eagle appearance, should be used. Eventually, the decision was made to use a faithful, but enlarged, reproduction of the original eagle. The sculpture was cast in bronze at Bedi-Makky Art Foundry in New York at a cost of $17,900 (equivalent to $186,069 in 2024).

Paulsen Construction Company was awarded the contract to erect the monument, bidding a cost of $95,000 (equivalent to $975,712 in 2024). The new monument was put in place beginning in October 1963, and the eagle, wrapped in canvas until the dedication, was placed atop the monument on October 30.

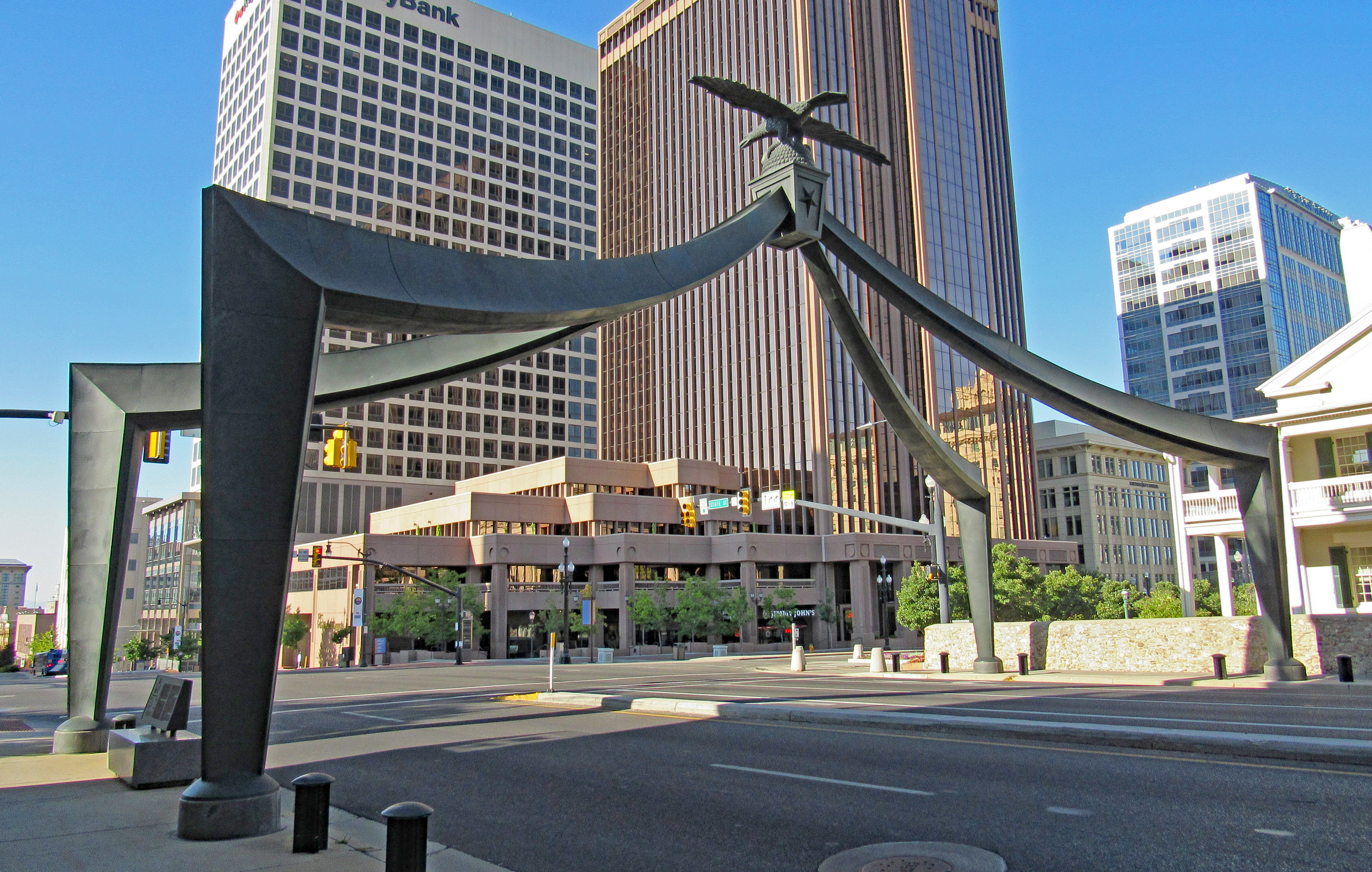
The 1960s Eagle Gate monument, as seen in 2016

The monument was dedicated on November 1, 1963, by LDS Church President David O. McKay. A new time capsule, placed in a large granite stone on the sidewalk between the two east pillars of the monument, was sealed on December 17, 1963. Included were many of the items that had been sealed in the 1891 time capsule, along with new materials related to the creation and dedication of the 1960s monument. On top of the stone was placed a large plaque with the history of the monument.

Like its predecessors, the monument's proximity to busy streets has led to it being damaged in several accidents over the years. For example, in 1988, a vehicle hit the large stone containing the time capsule, exposing the metal box.

== Replicas ==
A replica of the Eagle Gate was created for the Utah Building at the World's Columbian Exposition in 1893. It formed an arch over the main walkway to the building. Following the fair, the eagle was given to the Deseret Agricultural & Manufacturing Company, which planned to place it at the Utah State Fairgrounds. (Note: Although some Salt Lake City citizens have claimed that the original Eagle Gate sculpture, rather than the world's fair replica, ended up at the fair grounds.)

This Is the Place Heritage Park replica

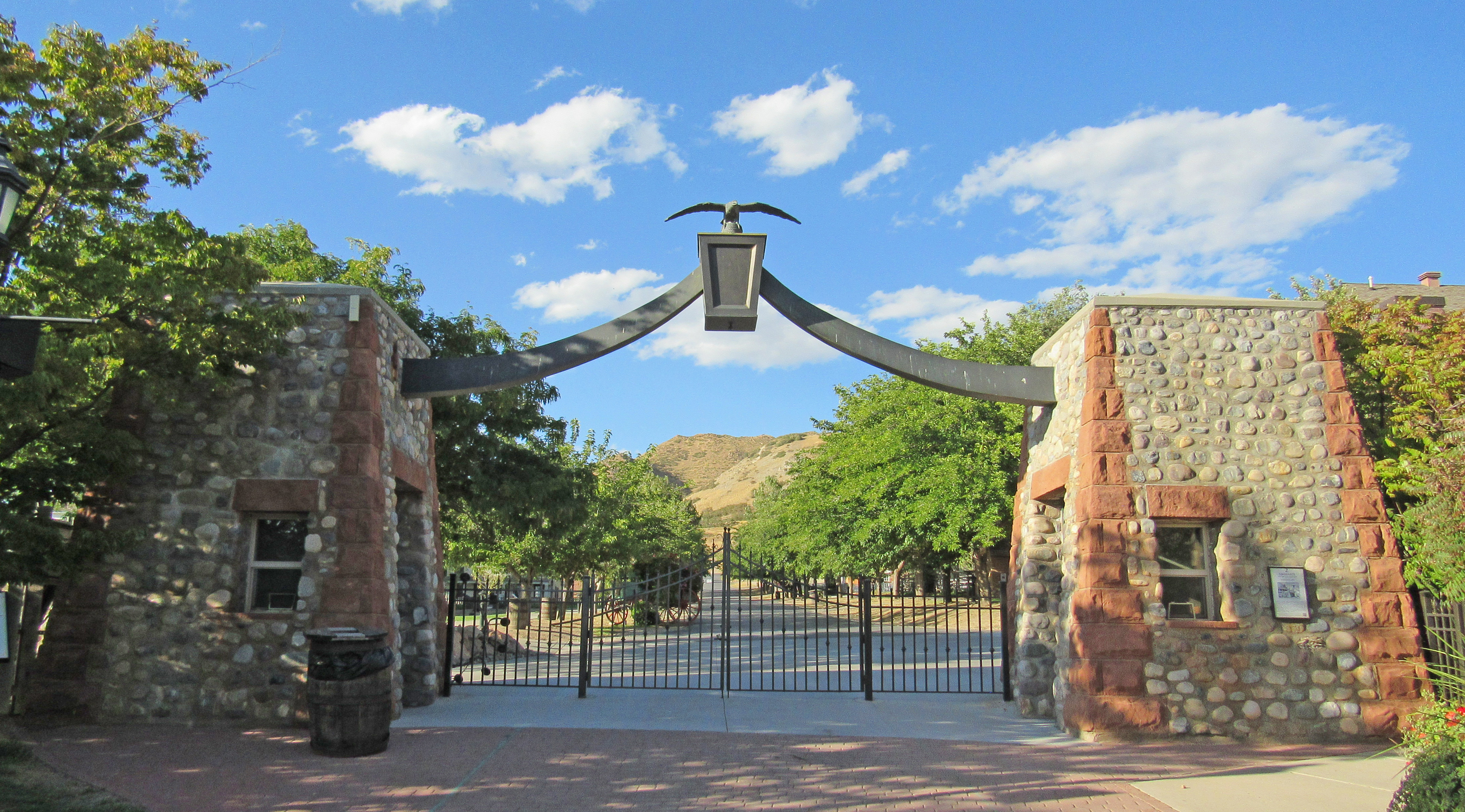
As seen in 2018

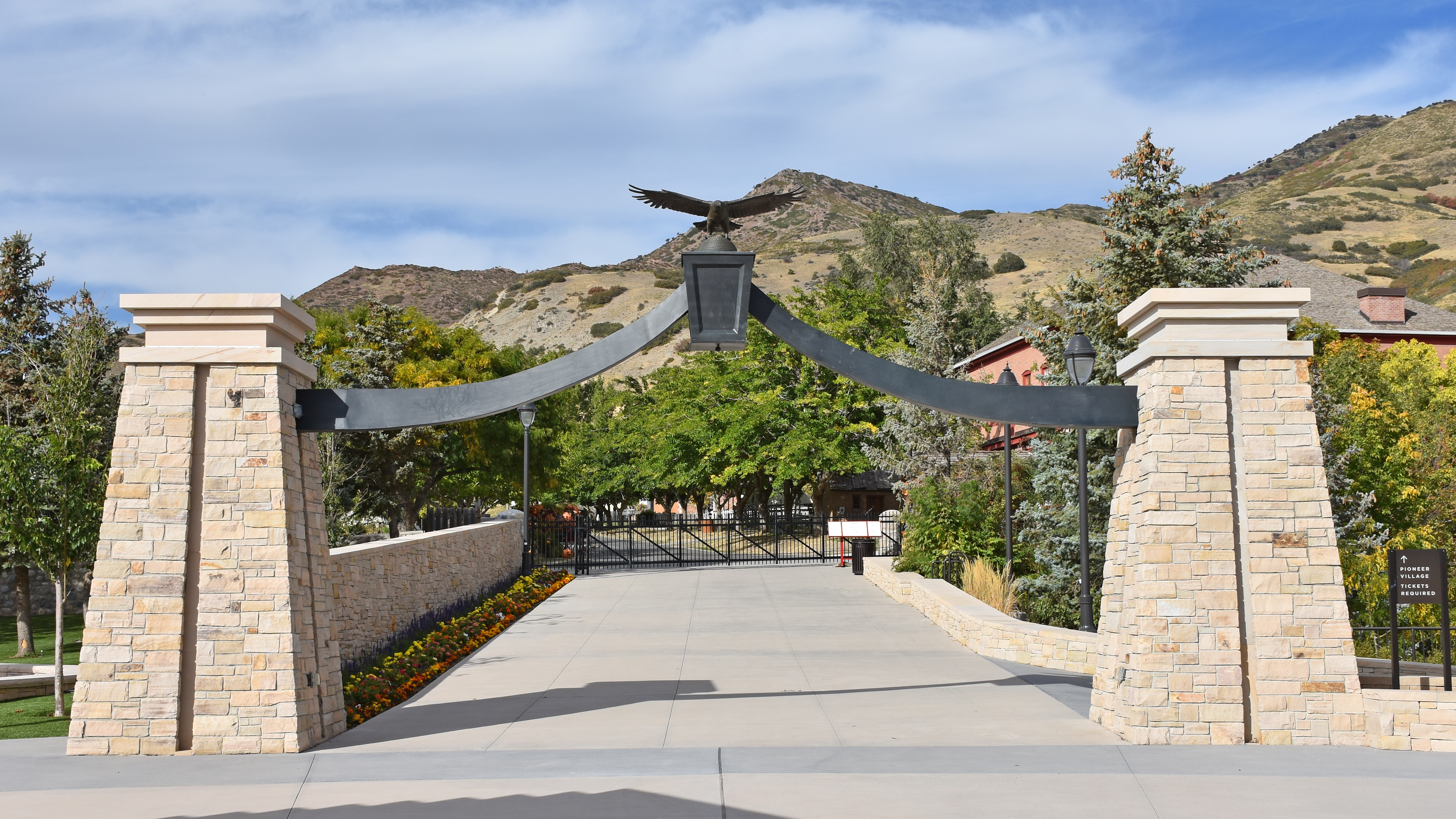
As seen in 2022

In the early 2000s, This Is the Place Heritage Park added a new entrance plaza, and a replica of the Eagle Gate was built as the main entrance to the park's pioneer village. When the gate replica was first opened, the eagle was not similar to that originally on the Eagle Gate, instead it was a modern eagle sculpture. After discovering this, descendants of Ralph Ramsay, who had carved the original 1859 eagle, raised $10,000 (equivalent to $15,598 in 2024) to replace the eagle with a historically accurate copy. This historically accurate sculpture had been created by Grant R. Fairbanks in the 1960s and was his smaller, working model used when he created the eagle sculpture on the current Eagle Gate. The working model was repaired, bronzed and placed on the Eagle Gate at the park in August 2006. In March 2021, the Pioneer Center, the park's new visitor center, was dedicated. As part of the construction of this center, the entrance plaza was redone and the Eagle Gate replica was significantly changed; the gate was moved closer to the Pioneer Center, new pillars were built that no longer reflected the cobblestone construction of the 1859 gate, and the historically accurate eagle sculpture was no longer used.

== Bibliography ==
- Williamsen, April (Summer 1999). "Secrets of Eagle Gate: Storied Structure is a Nostalgic Reminder of Pioneer Utah". Pioneer. Sons of Utah Pioneers: 17–21.
- Young Spencer, Clarissa; Harmer, Mabel (1940). Brigham Young At Home. Salt Lake City: Deseret Book.
