= Eliza R. Snow Performing Arts Center =

Coordinates: 43°49′16″N 111°47′01″W

The Eliza R. Snow Performing Arts Center is a performing arts center located at Brigham Young University-Idaho in Rexburg, Idaho, United States. The building is home to the Music and Performing Arts departments of BYU-Idaho, as well as the famed 700-seat Barrus Concert Hall. It also has a 500-seat drama theatre.

Among the musical instruments housed in the center is the Keith Martindale Stefan Memorial Organ which was dedicated by L. Tom Perry in 1984. The Mormon Tabernacle Choir also broadcast Music and the Spoken Word from the Snow center that same day.

== See also ==
- List of concert halls
- Eliza R. Snow
