= Lest We Forget (sculpture) =

Sculpture in Salt Lake City, Utah, U.S.

Ever Pressing Forward
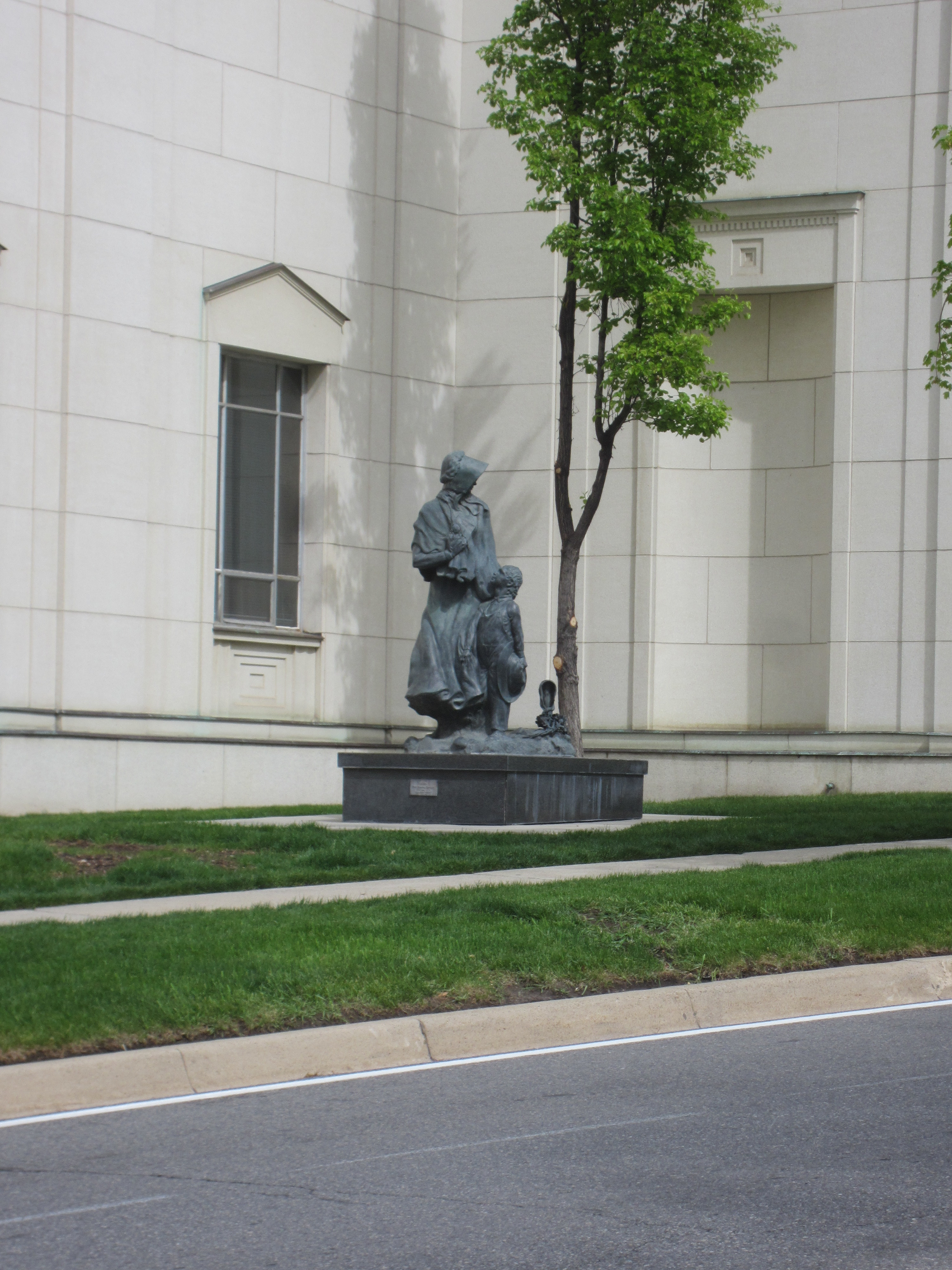
- Ever Pressing Forward statue in 2021
- Year: 2001
- Location: Salt Lake City, Utah, United States
- 40°46′36.1″N 111°53′27.4″W

Ever Pressing Forward is a bronze sculpture installed on the exterior east side of the Pioneer Memorial Museum in Salt Lake City, Utah. It was sculpted by Karl Alfred Quilter (1929-2013) in 2001. Across the street is the associated Lest We Forget monument and plaque are on the southwest grounds of the Utah State Capitol Building.

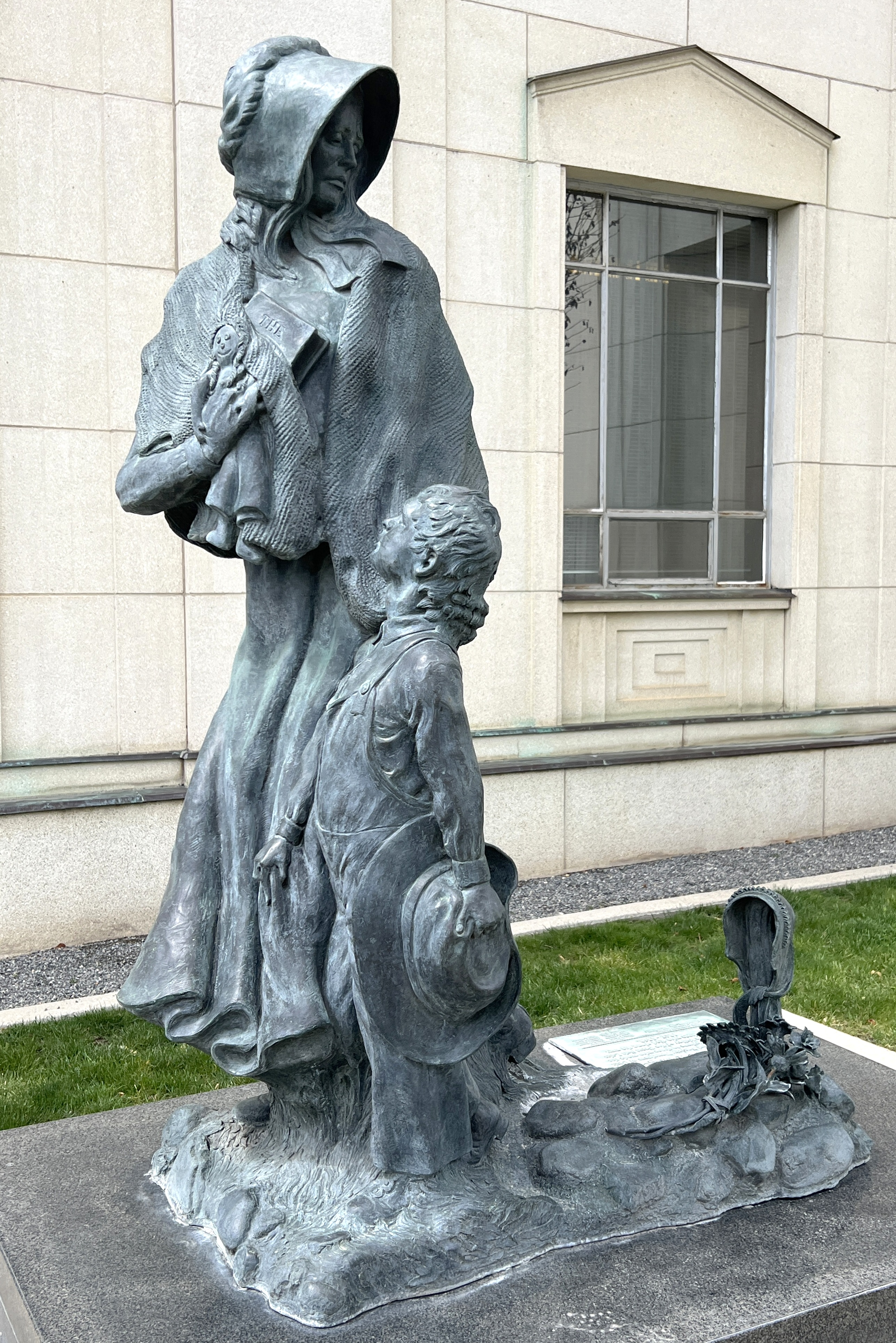
Ever Pressing Forward statue (2001) by Karl Alfred Quilter (1929-2013) at Pioneer Memorial Museum in 2024

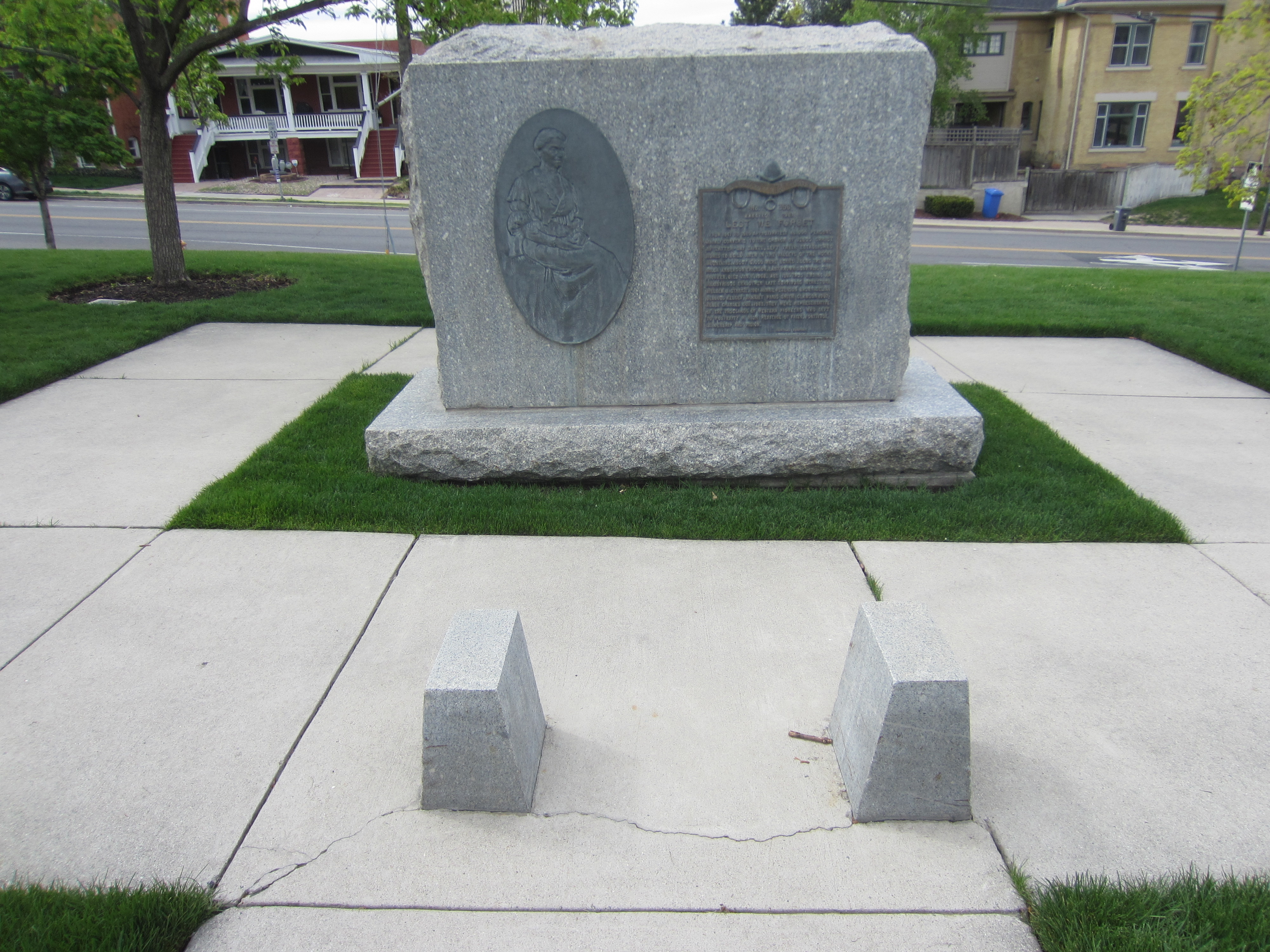
The Lest We Forget monument (1968) at Utah Capitol Building in 2021

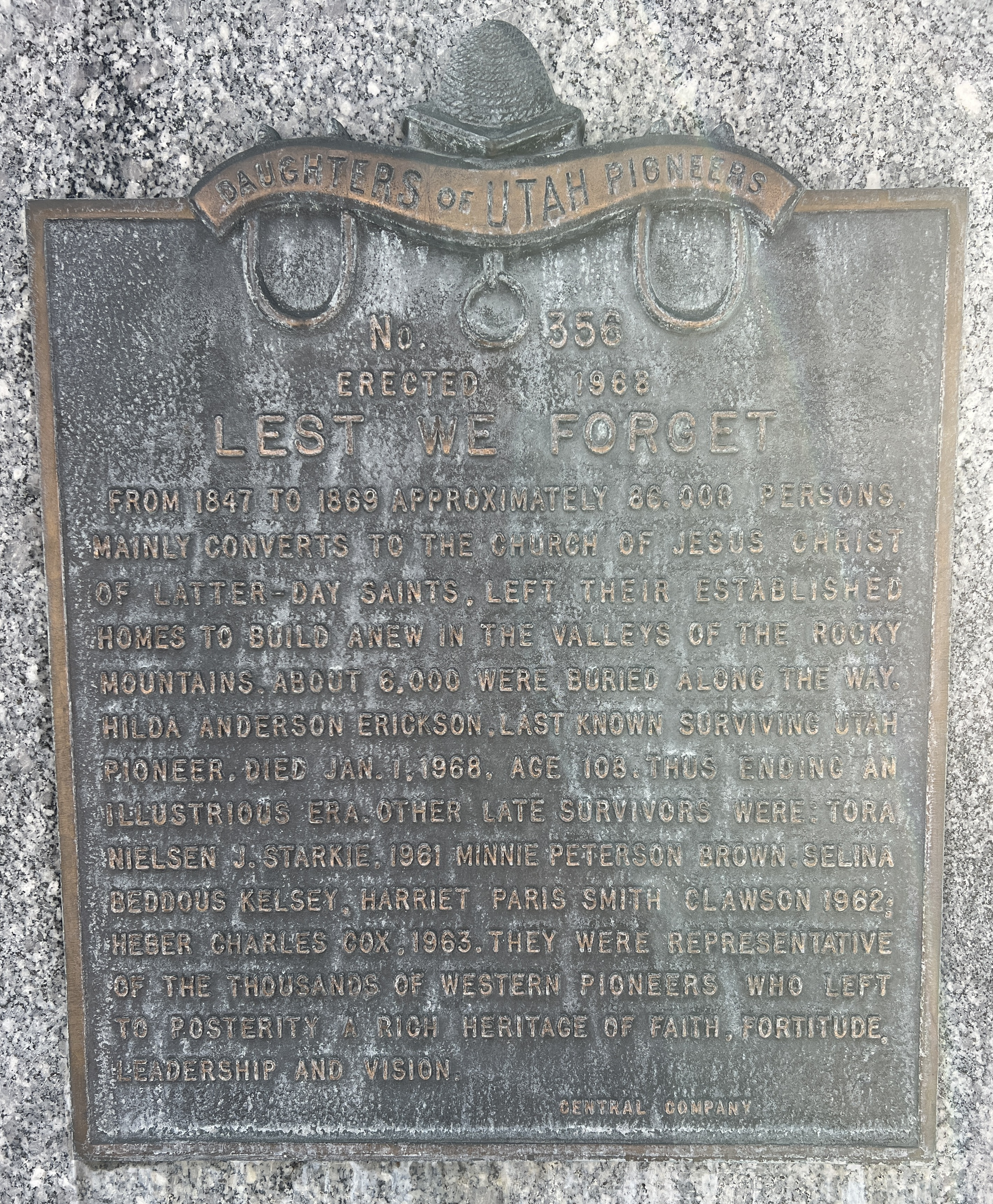
Lest We Forget plaque (1968) by Daughters of Utah Pioneers at Utah Capitol Building in 2024
