= Pioneer Memorial Museum =

Museum in Salt Lake City, Utah, United States

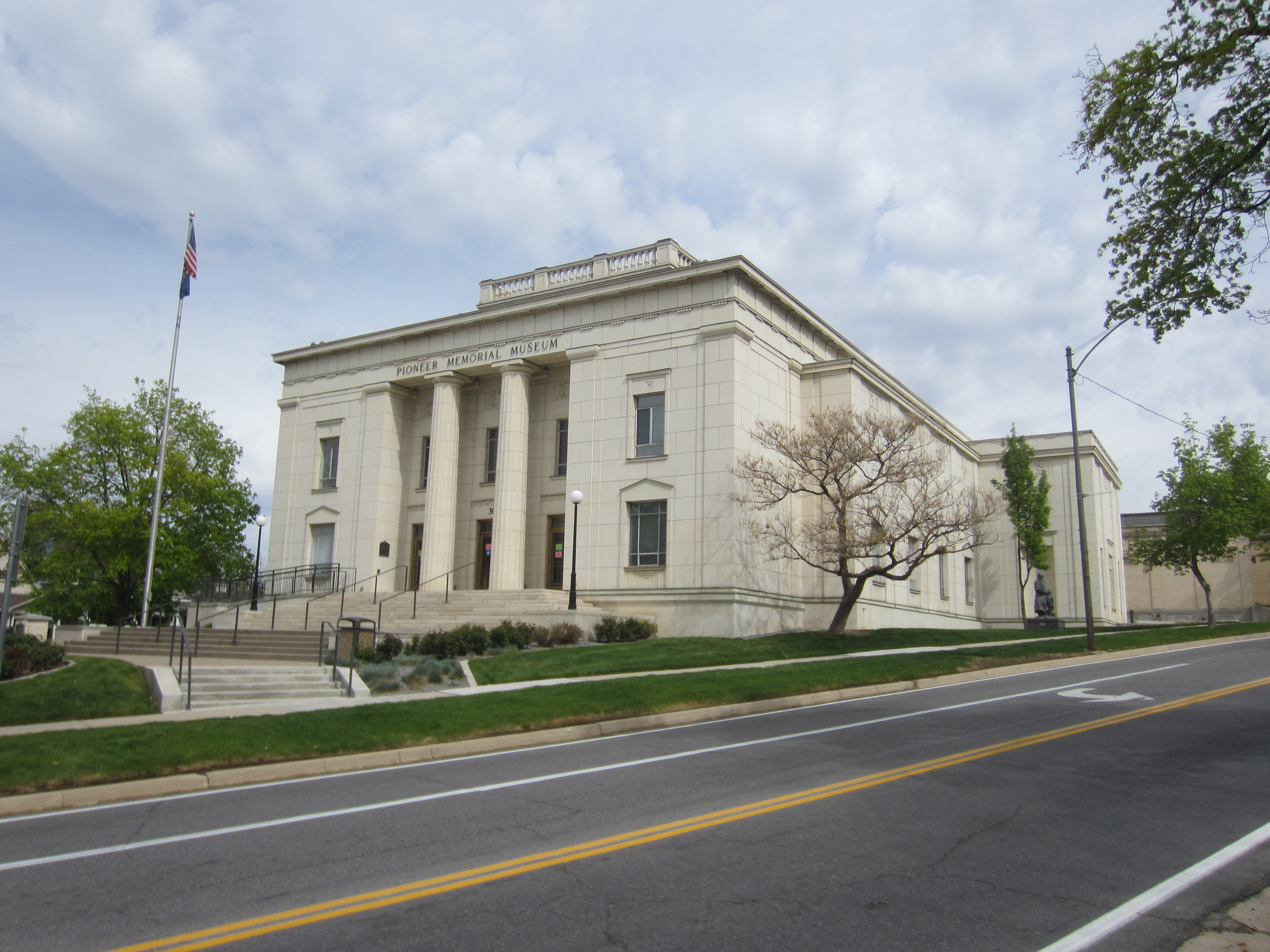
- The museum's exterior in 2021
- Established: July 22, 1950
- Location: Salt Lake City, Utah, United States
- Coordinates: 40°46′36″N 111°53′28″W
- Architect: Lorenzo Snow Young
- Owner: Daughters of Utah Pioneers
- Website: Pioneer Memorial Museum

The Pioneer Memorial Museum is a history museum operated by the Daughters of Utah Pioneers (DUP) on Capitol Hill in Salt Lake City, Utah, United States. The museum hosts a large collection of artifacts related to the Mormon pioneers and early Utah, along with libraries containing pioneer biographies and photographs.

The building also serves as headquarters for the DUP, which has hundreds of local units (called "camps") in communities throughout the Mormon corridor, many of which operate their own satellite museums.

== Collection ==
The museum's collection contains thousands of artifacts from the Mormon-pioneer era (defined as the time period prior to the completion of the first transcontinental railroad in May 1869). Several of the museum's levels are split into different rooms, each with themes, such as a room with relics related to the Salt Lake Theatre and one containing the possessions of Ellis Reynolds Shipp, an early female doctor in Utah. Other prominent artifacts include: the wagon Brigham Young was riding in when he entered Salt Lake Valley on July 24, 1847, the original eagle from Salt Lake City's historic Eagle Gate, and a supply wagon used by the United States Army during the Utah War.

Two pieces of art, the Eliza Roxey Snow statue and Ever Pressing Forward statue are installed outside of the building.

== Design ==
The building's exterior was designed to be reminiscent of the historic Salt Lake Theatre. Its structure consists of a concrete frame with cast stone façade and a roof that features a large skylight. The building has three floors, plus a basement, and is owned by the state of Utah (but leased to the DUP).

== History ==
=== Former buildings ===
The DUP was formed in 1901 and early on began collecting artifacts. Their office and collection was originally located in the old Deseret Store/Deseret News building, today the site of the Joseph Smith Memorial Building. In 1906, the organization was invited by LDS University to move into a room of the Lion House. In 1911, when the Deseret Museum opened in the newly constructed Vermont Building on South Temple street, the DUP moved their collection into a section of that museum. After a second story addition to the Bureau of Information on Temple Square was completed in 1915, the collection was then moved to that building. The artifacts then made a move to their final temporary home in 1919, when they began to be displayed in the Utah State Capitol.

=== Planning and construction ===
By 1936, the DUP was making plans to build their own headquarters and museum on the Utah State Capitol grounds, hoping to have it completed by the Mormon pioneer centennial celebration in 1947. In 1937, the DUP decided to model the exterior of the museum on the demolished Salt Lake Theatre and to build it on a small plot of land called the triangle, just southwest of the capitol building. The Utah State Legislature passed a bill in 1941, agreeing to lease the land to the DUP. The bill required the DUP raise $50,000 towards the building by 1943. That date was later extended to 1945, and then again to 1946 when the required sum was increased to $75,000. The state would provide $225,000, which, when added to the portion raised by the DUP, would provide $300,000 for the building's construction. The DUP presented their $75,000 check to the state in January 1946, and Utah Governor Herbert B. Maw gave the final go ahead to design and construct the museum. Lorenzo Snow Young was hired as architect.

Some nearby homeowners fought against the museum, over concerns it would ruin the symmetry of the capitol grounds, that the lot was too small and parking would be inadequate and would create traffic hazards. Salt Lake City was unable to enforce zoning regulations on the museum, due to it being state owned. The local chapter of the American Institute of Architects also protested the building, because of both its design based on the old theatre building and what they considered a poor site choice. This resulted in the building's architect resigning from the organization. Groundbreaking services for the museum were held on March 25, 1946, with addresses by George Albert Smith, president of LDS Church, and Kate B. Carter, president of the DUP. Construction bids later that year came in nearly double what had been set aside for construction; the DUP asked the legislature for $200,000 in additional funding during the next session, and were granted $150,000. After another check was provided to the state for $14,000 by the DUP, construction was approved in October 1947.

Soon after construction began, a lawsuit before the Utah Supreme Court halted work on the museum. The lawsuit charged that the project was in violation of the constitutions of the United States and Utah because it provided taxpayer money and special privileges to a private corporation (the DUP). The state asked for the suit to be dismissed as the building would be state owned, on state property, and only leased to the DUP to serve the public. Following a hearing on the case in February 1948, the Utah Supreme Court (in a 3-2 decision) ruled in July of that year that the agreement was constitutional and allowed construction to resume. The case was appealed to the Supreme Court of the United States which declined to review it. Construction was greenlit in October 1948, and resumed that December. The construction delay increased costs, which resulted in additional appropriations from the state and fundraising by the DUP to complete the building.

Much of spring 1950 was spent cleaning and preparing to move the artifacts from the Utah State Capitol to the museum. In June 1950, the collection began to be moved from the capitol to the new museum. The completed building cost $600,000 (equivalent to $8,029,046 in 2025).

=== Opening ===
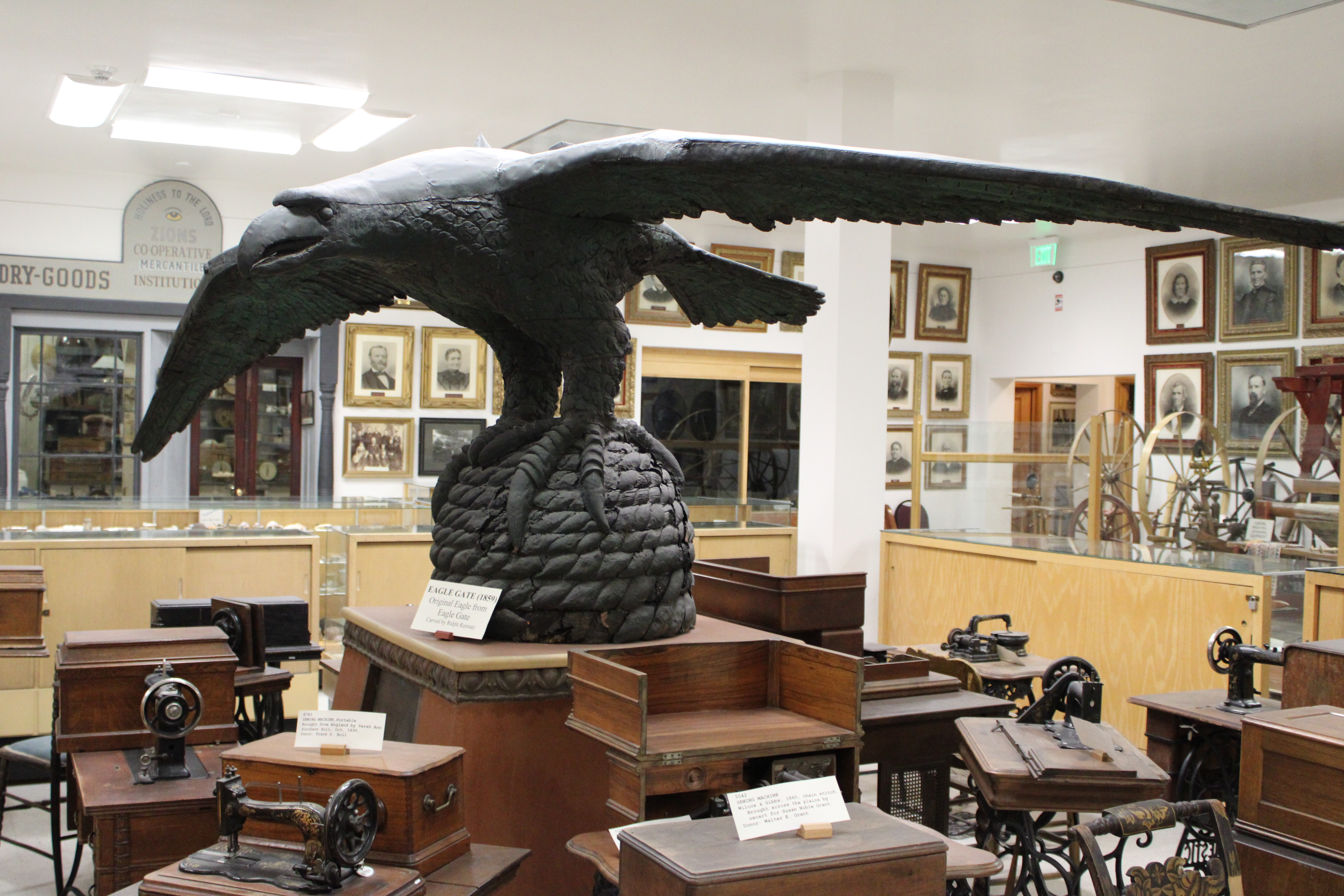
The original eagle from Salt Lake City's historic Eagle Gate

The opening ceremonies for the museum lasted three days, from July 22–24, 1950. The museum officially opened on July 22, with dedication services held on July 23. Church Apostle Ezra Taft Benson dedicated the building on behalf of George Albert Smith, who was too ill to attend. Services also included remarks from Governor J. Bracken Lee; Utah's secretary of state, Heber Bennion Jr. (who presented the building to the DUP on a 99-year lease); and Amy B. Lyman. That evening, actor Moroni Olsen participated in the ceremonies by giving a reading of the dedication poem. On the final day of ceremonies, July 24 (known as Pioneer Day in Utah), an open house with 65 surviving pioneers was held at the museum. The oldest of the group was 102-year-old Anne Catherine Milne, who had arrived to Salt Lake City via wagon 90 years prior.

=== Later history ===
A second exhibit building, called the Carriage House and connected via underground passageway to the main museum, was dedicated October 6, 1973. The construction was paid for by DUP member Sara Marie Jensen Van Dyke, who had willed her estate to the organization.

The museum was rededicated on October 8, 2010, with a dedicatory prayer by Marlin K. Jensen, Church Historian and Recorder, and a ribbon-cutting ceremony which included Governor Gary Herbert. The rededication followed extensive renovation of the museum.

== See also ==
- Buildings and sites of Salt Lake City
- List of museums in Utah
- Museum of Utah
