= Bryant S. Hinckley =

American academic

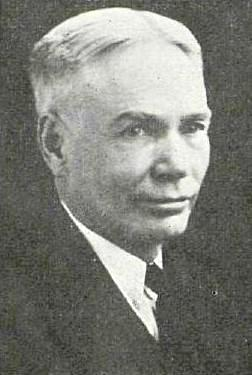
- Bryant S. Hinckley
- Born: Bryant Stringham Hinckley; July 9, 1867; Coalville, Utah
- Died: June 5, 1961 (aged 93)

Bryant Stringham Hinckley (July 9, 1867 – June 5, 1961) was an American author, religious speaker, civic leader and educator. He served as a prominent mid-level leader in the Church of Jesus Christ of Latter-day Saints in the early 20th century. His books were primarily designed for a Latter-day Saint audience.

Hinckley was the father of Gordon B. Hinckley, who served as an apostle and the president of the LDS Church. Bryant's brother Alonzo A. Hinckley was also an Apostle. They were both half-brothers of Edwin S. Hinckley, a prominent educator at Brigham Young University. His father was Ira Hinckley. He was named for Briant Stringham, an early judge and stock raiser in Utah.

Hinckley was the principal of the Latter-day Saint High School in Salt Lake City. During the first decade of the 20th century, he was the head of LDS Business College. Hinckley had previously been the head of the Commercial Department at Brigham Young Academy. Today there is a scholarship at LDS Business College named after him.

Hinckley later served as the superintendent of the LDS Church owned Deseret Gym.

== Family ==
Bryant Stringham Hinckley was born to Ira Nathaniel Hinckley and his wife Angeline Wilcox Noble. Bryant's mother, Angeline, had been born in Livonia, Michigan. He was Ira and Angeline's fifth child and was a full brother of Alonzo A. Hinckley.

Hinckley married four times, his first three wives having predeceased him. In 1893, Hinckley married Christina Johnson (1870–1908). After Johnson's death, he married Ada Bitner (1880–1930) in 1909. After Bitner's death, he married May Green (1881–1943) in 1932. After Green's death, he married Lois Anderson (1889–1983) in 1944.

All of Hinckley's children were born to his first two wives, Christina Johnson and Ada Bitner.

== Church service ==
Born in Coalville, Utah, Hinckley was president of the Liberty Stake in Salt Lake City from 1919 to 1936, which was then the largest stake in the church with about 20,000 members.

He also served on the general board of the LDS Church's organization for young men, the Young Men's Mutual Improvement Association from 1900 to 1925. While on this board he moved for the adoption of the Boy Scout program by the church. He had also been on one of the committees that led to the establishment of the Improvement Era. Other members of this committee included B. H. Roberts and Reed Smoot.

From 1936 to 1939, Hinckley was president of the Northern States Mission of the LDS Church, which was based in Chicago. While serving in this position he tried to convince the leaders of the LDS Church to rebuild the Nauvoo Temple. Also while in this position he represented the church at the dedication of the monument to the Mormon handcart pioneers in Iowa City erected by the Daughters of the American Revolution in 1936. That same year Hinckley organized the first branch of the Church in Lansing, Michigan Also in this capacity he was involved in organizing the celebration of the centennial of Nauvoo in 1939.

After the end of his mission in 1939 Hinckley served as secretary to the Church Board of Education, working with the LDS seminary program.

== Speaking ==
Hinckley was also a popular speaker. He attended Brigham Young Academy where he studied under Karl G. Maeser. He won a contest to be the speaker at his commencement, and would be noted the rest of his life as a great orator. Among other speeches to church congregations he gave at least two talks at general conferences.

Hinckley also participated in giving talks in the church's "Church of the Air" program on KSL radio in the 1930s.

== Later life and recognitions ==
From 1940 to 1941 Hinckley served as the President of the BYU Alumni Association. While in this office he was responsible for the formation of the emeritus club, of which he later served as the leader.

For a time there was a "Bryant S. Hinckley Award" given to recognize people for the service they had performed in boy scouts. The Boy Scouts of America also maintain a scout ranch named after Hinckley in the Uinta Mountains.

== Publications ==
Biographies:

- Sermons and Missionary Services of Melvin J. Ballard. Deseret Book Company. 3.
- Bryant Stringham and his People, Salt Lake City, UT, Stevents and Wallis, 1949.
- Heber J. Grant: Highlights in the Life of a Great Leader published by Deseret Book in 1951.
- Daniel Hammer Wells and the Events of his Time.

Inspirational materials:

- The Faith of Our Pioneer Fathers Salt Lake City: Deseret Book Co., 1959.
- Not by Bread Alone a compilation of inspirational stories aimed at helping teachers.
- That Ye Might Have Joy a collection of articles compiled by his children, used as a companion to Not by Bread Alone. Salt Lake City: Bookcraft, inc., 1958.

Hinckley also wrote several articles for the LDS Church publication, the Improvement Era.

== See also ==
- Gordon B. Hinckley : son
- Virginia H. Pearce : granddaughter
