= Ira Hinckley =

Early Latter Day Saint leader

Ira N. Hinckley
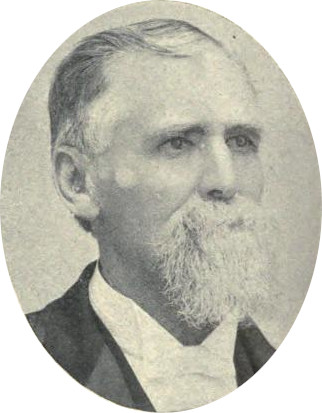
- Born: October 30, 1828; Bastard Township, Ontario, Canada
- Died: April 10, 1904 (aged 75); Provo, Utah
- Known for: Founder of Cove Fort

Ira Nathaniel Hinckley (October 30, 1828 – April 10, 1904) was an early Latter Day Saint leader who supervised the construction and maintenance of Cove Fort, along with his brother Arza Hinckley, a strategically placed fortification about halfway between Salt Lake City and St. George, Utah. He was the father of author Bryant S. Hinckley and LDS apostle Alonzo A. Hinckley, the grandfather of LDS church president Gordon B. Hinckley, and an acquaintance of Joseph Smith Jr.

Hinckley was born in Bastard Township, Leeds County, Upper Canada. He joined the Church of Jesus Christ of Latter Day Saints in 1844.

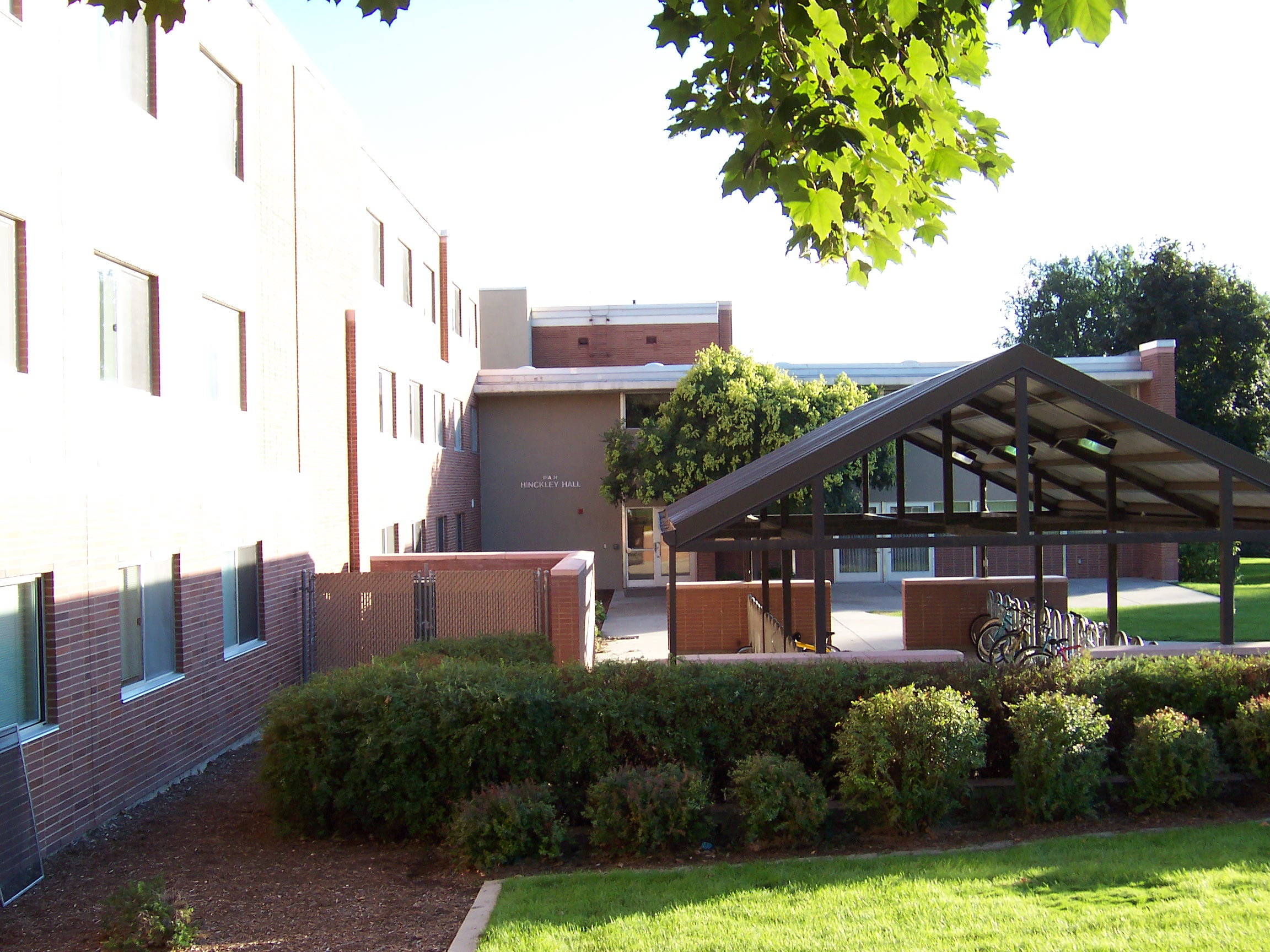
Hinckley Hall, located at BYU

In 1867, Hinckley was living on his farm in Coalville, Utah Territory, when Brigham Young asked him to build a fortified way station at Cove Creek. Hinckley left for the area within days. The fort was restored in the early 1990s.

Hinckley practiced plural marriage. He had four wives, but never more than three at one time: Eliza Jane Evans, Adelaide Cameron Noble, her sister Angeline Wilcox Noble, and Margaret Harley, who was 31 years his junior. Hinckley was the father of 21 children. The last-born, a daughter of Harley who was born when Ira was 61, did not meet her father until she was almost two years old because he was afraid that he might be arrested for cohabitation if he visited her house. Hinckley ultimately was arrested and fined $200.

== See also ==
- Willden Fort
- Virginia H. Pearce : great-granddaughter
- Edwin S. Hinckley : son
