= Willden Fort =

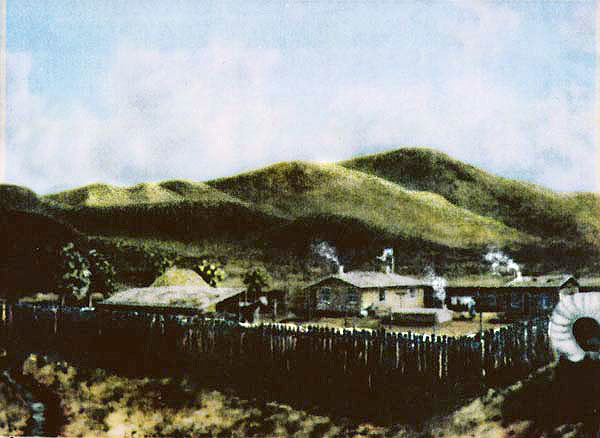
Willden Fort

Willden Fort was a wooden-palisade fort constructed on Cove Creek in Utah in 1860 by Charles William Willden and his son Ellott Willden. It was occupied from 1860 to 1865, abandoned, then occupied briefly in 1867 during the construction of Cove Fort.

== Siting and construction ==
In 1852, Mormon leader Brigham Young sent Charles Willden to Cedar City to work in the ironworks The Church of Jesus Christ of Latter-day Saints was attempting to establish, since Willden had worked in the steel industry in Sheffield, England, prior to immigrating to the United States of America. While traveling between Salt Lake City, and Cedar City, the Willdens camped at Cove Creek and observed it to be a nice place to settle.

When the ironworks failed in 1859, Willden decided to settle Cove Creek. He and his son Ellott built Willden Fort near what would later be the site of the still-present Cove Fort. They first constructed an adobe house, then enclosed it with a 150-foot square cedar-post stockade. The posts were 8 to 10 ft high, placed close together to form a solid wall.

== Occupation ==
Willden Fort was first occupied during the spring of 1860, and the Willden family lived there continuously until 1865 when a combination of Indian attacks due to Utah's Black Hawk War and a very harsh winter that killed most of the family's livestock convinced the Willdens to return to Beaver, Utah.

While the Willdens occupied the fort, they received a continuous stream of visitors, because Willden Fort was located along the Mormon Road, a major travel corridor between Salt Lake City and Los Angeles, and was at a convenient stopping place. Some of the prominent visitors who stayed at the fort were Brigham Young, Lorenzo Snow, John Taylor and Ezra T. Benson. After the abandonment of Willden Fort, Brigham Young directed Ira Hinckley to construct a new fort on the same location. The Willden family returned to Willden Fort to assist with the construction of Cove Fort. Willden Fort also briefly housed the telegraph office during the construction of Cove Fort, making it the site of the first telegraph in Millard County, Utah.

== Archaeological excavation ==
In 1996, the Archaeology Department at Brigham Young University organized and conducted an excavation at the location where Willden Fort is thought to have been located. Willden family descendants were interviewed to determine the most likely location and teams of students and professors from the university carefully excavated the site. No remnants of the fort or house were found.

== Recognition ==
On September 21, 1996, the Church of the Latter Day Saints organized a ceremony and provided a plaque to commemorate the history of the site and honor the Willden family for their contributions to the history of the region and to Cove Fort. The ceremony was attended by 850 descendants of Charles and his wife Eleanor.
