= Albert E. Bowen =

American Mormon leader (1875–1953)

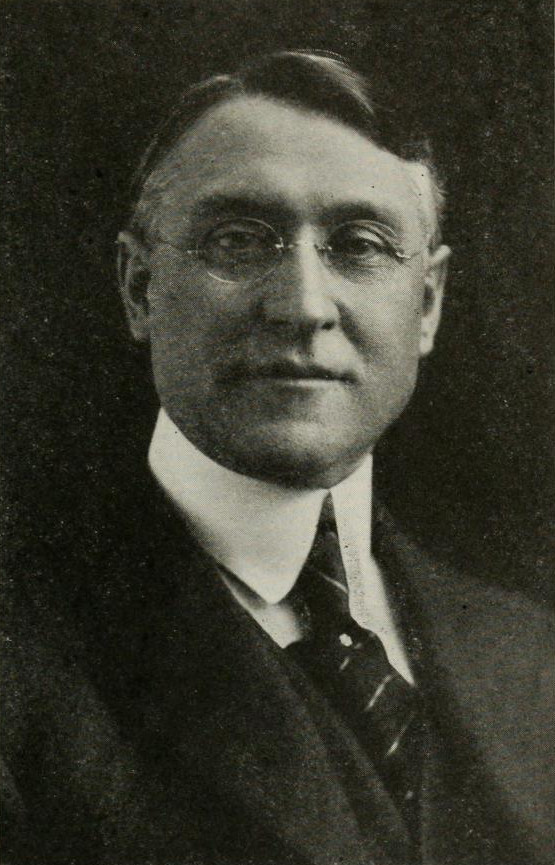

Quorum of the Twelve Apostles
- April 8, 1937 – July 15, 1953
- Called by: Heber J. Grant

LDS Church Apostle
- April 8, 1937 – July 15, 1953
- Called by: Heber J. Grant
- Reason: Death of Alonzo A. Hinckley
- Reorganization at end of term: Richard L. Evans ordained

Personal details
- Born: Albert Ernest Bowen; October 31, 1875; Henderson Creek, Idaho Territory
- Died: July 15, 1953 (aged 77); Salt Lake City, Utah, U.S.
- Resting place: Salt Lake City Cemetery; 40°46′37.92″N 111°51′28.8″W
- Spouse(s): Aletha Reeder (1902–06); Emma Lucy Gates (1916–51)
- Parents: David Bowen; Annie Shackleton

Albert Ernest Bowen (October 31, 1875 – July 15, 1953) was an American lawyer and Mormon religious leader who served as a member of the Quorum of the Twelve Apostles of the Church of Jesus Christ of Latter-day Saints (LDS Church).

== Early life and education ==
Born in Henderson Creek, Idaho Territory, to David Bowen and Annie Shackleton, Bowen served as an LDS Church missionary in Switzerland and Germany from 1902 to 1904.

Bowen received a J.D. degree from the University of Chicago Law School. He was a lawyer in Logan, Utah, and the county attorney for Cache County, Utah. He later worked in Salt Lake City.

== Career ==
Bowen joined the "Clark and Richards" law firm on 24 January 1922, changing the name to "Clark, Richards, and Bowen." Bowen maintained an intimate friendship with J. Reuben Clark and was said to have summarised his three main virtues as having "vigorous and discriminating intellect," "prodigious power of work," and "uncompromising, undeviating honesty."

Later on, Bowen served on the General Board of the Deseret Sunday School Union and as president of the Sunday School Union for the Cache Stake, based in Logan, Utah. In The Church Welfare Plan, published by the Deseret Sunday School Union in 1946, Bowen wrote about the need for the Church to care for the poor and infirm and assure them a respectable place in the community. Bowen also argued that as the Saints become more economic prosperous in the early 20th century, wealthier wards were neglecting to collect charity such as monthly fast offerings, and so the burden of welfare relief was increasingly falling upon those in poorer wards.

In 1935, Bowen became the Superintendent of the LDS Church's Young Men's Mutual Improvement Association (YMMIA), succeeding George Albert Smith. In 1937, Bowen was chosen by church president Heber J. Grant to fill a spot in the Quorum of the Twelve Apostles that was left vacant by the death of Alonzo A. Hinckley. At the same time, Bowen was succeeded at the YMMIA by George Q. Morris.

During World War II, Bowen said: "We must... sustain our country to the full measure of the requirement of loyalty and patriotic devotion." He also believed that "We dare not lose that war," as defeat would lead to the end of "liberty as we have come to esteem it."

In 1945, Bowen was on the Board of Trustees for Brigham Young University. Bowen was involved with the search for a new BYU president after World War II, and was one of the strongest supporters, along with John A. Widtsoe, of eventual appointee Ernest L. Wilkinson.

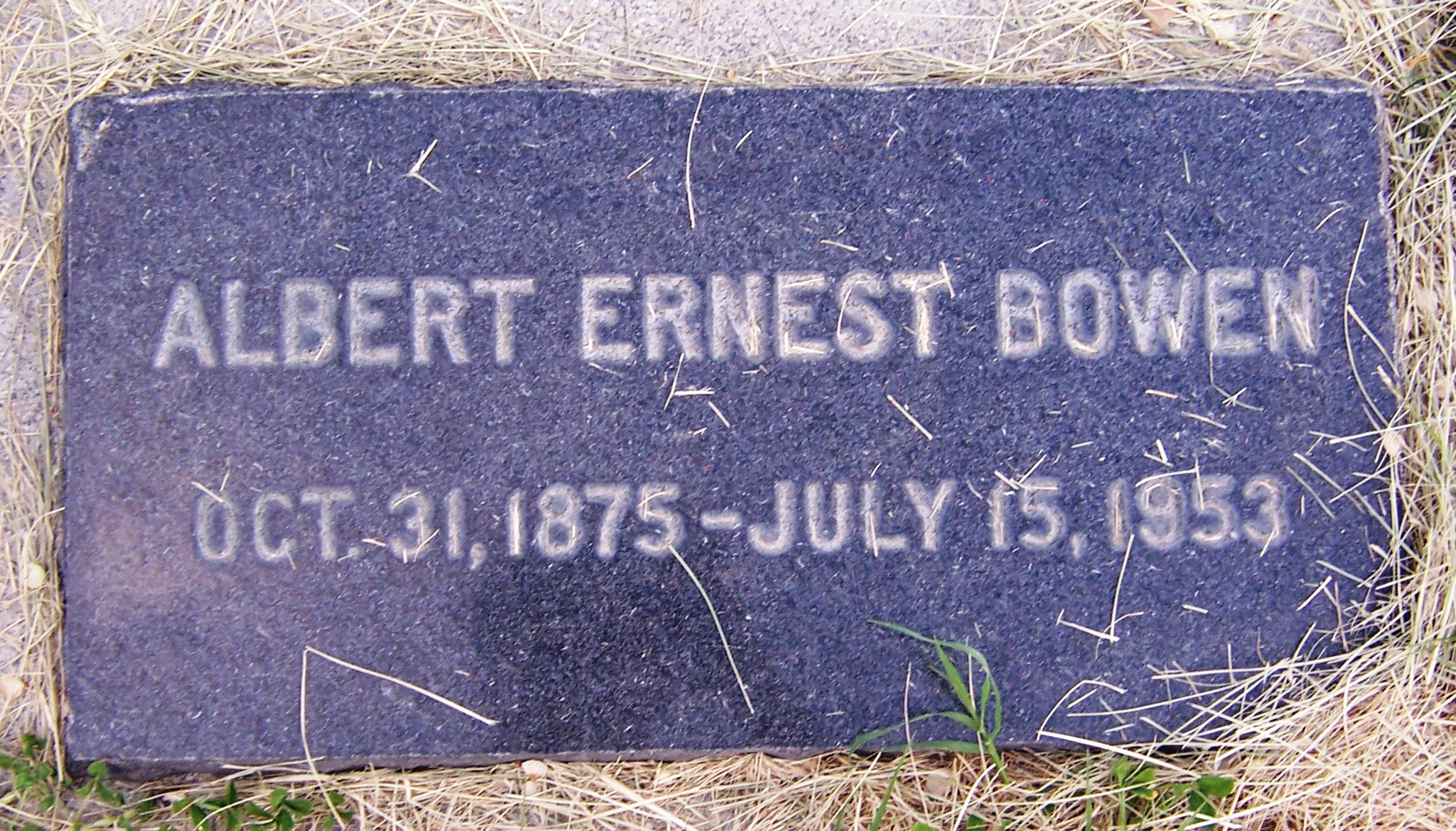
Grave marker of Albert E. Bowen.

It has been argued Bowen was probably the chief author behind an unsigned review of the prominent book No Man Knows My History by Fawn M. Brodie, which was one of the first biographies of Joseph Smith to take a secular and critical approach. This review, entitled "Appraisal of the So-Called Brodie Book," was published on May 11, 1946, in the Deseret News. In it, he criticizes the book by dismissing it as being "wholely atheistic" and nothing more than a "composite of all anti-Mormon books that have gone before pieced into a pattern conformable to the author's own particular rationale and bedded in some very bad psychology." It has been further argued that this likely mirrored the Church's official position as the review was republished and circulated as a missionary tract of the same title. Later on, in the April general conference of 1946, Bowen himself openly criticized the book, along with some others present, by making a "stirring defense" of Joseph Smith against the "poisonous slander of those who would make him out an imposter."

== Personal life ==
In 1902, Bowen married Aletha Reeder; they had two children. She died in 1906, and in 1916 Bowen married singer Emma Lucy Gates. He was married to Gates until her death in 1951.

Bowen died of arteriosclerosis in Salt Lake City at the age of 77. He was replaced in the Quorum of the Twelve by Richard L. Evans. Bowen was buried at Salt Lake City Cemetery.

== Published works ==
- Bowen, Albert E. (1946). The Church Welfare Plan. The Church of Jesus Christ of Latter-day Saints. 1.
- Constancy Amid Change. The Deseret News Press. 1944. 2.

The Church of Jesus Christ of Latter-day Saints titles
Preceded by Alonzo A. Hinckley	Quorum of the Twelve Apostles; April 14, 1937 – July 15, 1953	Succeeded by Sylvester Q. Cannon
Preceded by George Albert Smith	Superintendent of the Young Men’s Mutual Improvement Association; 1935 – 1937	Succeeded by George Q. Morris
