= Protests against Proposition 8 supporters =

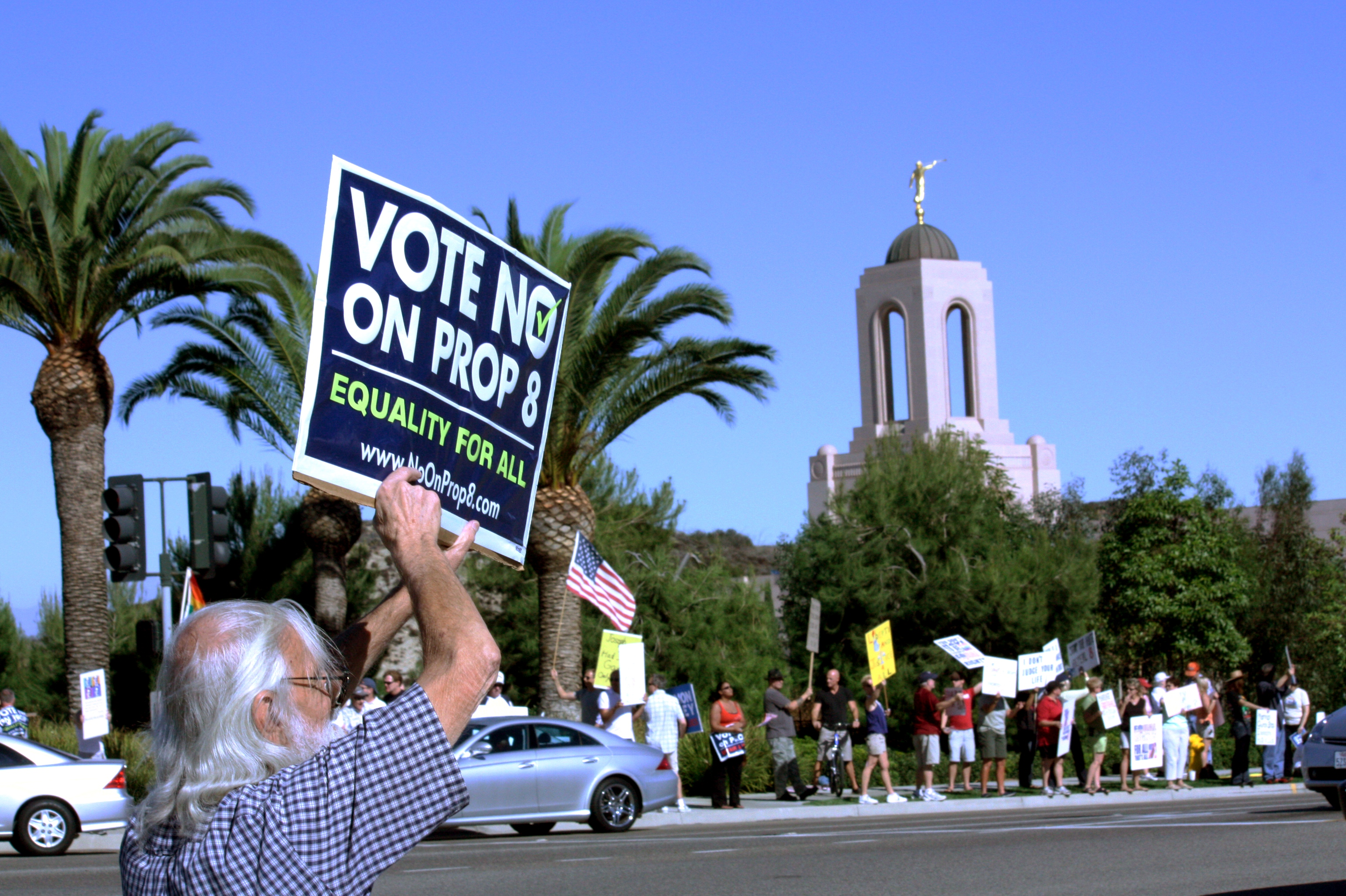
Opponents of Proposition 8 protest the LDS Church's support of the proposition in front of the Newport Beach California Temple.

Protests against Proposition 8 supporters in California took place starting in November 2008. These included prominent protests against the Catholic Church and the Church of Jesus Christ of Latter-day Saints (LDS Church), which supported California's Proposition 8. The proposition was a voter referendum that amended the state constitution to recognize marriage only as being between one man and one woman, thus banning same-sex marriage, which was legal in the state following a May 2008 California Supreme Court case.

The highly emotional, closely contested nature of the voter referendum created a political maelstrom that was unusual in intensity for its time. After closely passing, the backlash from those who opposed Proposition 8 was widely covered by news media and was controversial. Anti-Proposition 8 activists looked up supporters in state-government-required donation documentation, then posted their names and personal information, and organized protests at their places of work. Several religious buildings were vandalized, and several Proposition 8 supporters received death threats, were mailed envelopes of white powder resembling anthrax, or lost their jobs. This method of shaming and forcing out Proposition 8 supporters was called a "mob veto" in a full-page advertisement in The New York Times, which was signed by law professors, diplomats, civil rights activists, and heads of religious organizations, while others cited concerns about bigotry against those with religious beliefs.

== The ballot ==
Proposition 8 added "Only marriage between a man and a woman is valid or recognized in California" to the California Constitution. Proposition 8 was the most expensive proposition in United States history and sharply divided social conservatives and social liberals, as part of the ongoing American culture wars. The ballot initiative was approved by a majority (52%) of voters. Immediately same-sex marriages were halted and the legal status of the 18,000 same-sex couples was thrown into question. Supporters of the proposition included a coalition of religious and social conservatives that felt the court ruling had redefined marriage.

Those opposed to Proposition 8 argued that same-sex couples deserved the same public recognition and marriage rights that other couples are afforded, and that equality could not be achieved without state recognition in the form of marriage. On November 19, 2008, the California Supreme Court accepted three lawsuits challenging Proposition 8 but denied the requests to stay its enforcement.

== Candlelight vigils and pickets ==
As a result of the proposition's passage, there were organized autonomous protests directed against supporters of the proposition including marches, actions, vigils, boycotts, intimidation, and vandalism. The actions brought awareness to marriage rights issues for LGBT people and the role of tax-exempt churches in this political campaign. There was also renewed debate in LGBT communities whether boycotting companies or organizations is an appropriate and effective response toward the proposition's supporters.

Many anti-Proposition 8 protests, particularly those targeting specific groups that supported Proposition 8, took the form of pickets or candlelight vigils. A candlelight vigil by about 600 mothers of LGBT children was held at the LDS Church's Salt Lake Temple in Salt Lake City, Utah, shortly following the passage of Proposition 8. A protest was also held outside of the Los Angeles California Temple.

Protests were held outside of Cathedral of Our Lady of the Angels in Los Angeles.

== Boycotts ==
Following the passage of the proposition, opponents obtained lists of those who had donated to the "Yes on 8" campaign, published the list, organized an activism group, and called for boycotts of supporters' places of work. Boycott targets included:

- Marc Shaiman, a Broadway composer who had featured his musical Hairspray at the California Musical Theatre, demanded other gay artists boycott the theatre over a $1000 personal donation that the artistic director had made to the pro-Proposition 8 campaign. The director resigned on November 15, 2008.
- The LA Film Festival publicly distanced itself from its own director, who resigned on November 25, 2008. The director had made a personal $1,500 donation to the Yes on 8 campaign.
- The El Coyote Restaurant in Los Angeles was picketed after it was learned that the daughter of its owner had donated $100 to the Yes on 8 campaign. While pressured to resign, she refused. The restaurant was popular as a late-night hangout for gay people, but was picketed after her donation was made public.
- The Sundance Film Festival, based in Park City, Utah, was the target of calls for boycotts. Utah ranked second only to California for total donations in support of Proposition 8, while it ranked sixth for opposing donations, behind California and such heavily populated states as New York, Ohio, Illinois, and Michigan. Over the last two and a half weeks before the election, the Yes on 8 campaign received donations totaling $5 million from Utah residents.
- The Manchester Grand Hyatt Hotel in San Diego was boycotted after owner Doug Manchester donated $125,000 in support of Proposition 8. The boycott was against the Manchester Hyatt hotel specifically, and not against the Hyatt Hotel chain as a whole.
- Terry Caster, San Diego businessman, who persuaded Manchester to donate the $125,000 and who gave almost $700,000 to support Proposition 8. Caster built and owns the A-1 Self Storage Company, which gay-rights groups have also boycotted.
- William Bolthouse, Jr, founder of Bolthouse Farms, was forced out of the company for donating to the Proposition 8 campaign.
- Leatherby's Family Creamery, in Sacramento, was targeted after The Sacramento Bee published a list of contributors in support of Proposition 8. Their business increased when their establishment was picketed.

== Claims of religious bigotry ==
Some public figures, writers, media commentators, and individuals expressed concern over the actions and the implications of targeting supporters of the proposition. Supporters of the measure, such as Kathryn Jean Lopez, editor of the National Review Online, and Jonah Goldberg, a Los Angeles Times columnist, have referred to some of the backlash as religious bigotry, especially since many of those targeted are members of the LDS Church. Gregg Araki, an independent filmmaker who is gay, Jeff McDonald and John Marelius of the San Diego Union-Tribune, and others have articulated arguments depicting this characterization as misleading and provided possible justification of such actions.

Various individuals and groups have decried actions by those opposed to Proposition 8:

- The Becket Fund for Religious Liberty sponsored a full-page ad in the New York Times titled "No Mob Veto" which read in part, "When thugs send white powder to terrorize any place of worship, especially those of a religious minority, responsible voices need to speak clearly: Religious wars are wrong; they are also dangerous." It was signed by 13 people. The Human Rights Campaign responded to this, opposing violence but claiming that the ad distorted the truth when "they say we are in favor of mob intimidation and violence", suggesting that comments painted the entire opposition to Proposition 8 with the actions of a few. Another full-page New York Times ad placed by Truth Wins Out in response to The Becket Fund page goes further, accusing that ad of "blatant falsehoods", as well as "spotlighting the religious bigotry of the ad's very own signers."
- Several opinion pieces condemn the tactics, including "Editorial: Protest and civility in a democracy" from the Dallas Morning News, "So Much for Tolerance" from Chuck Colson for the Christian Post, and "California and Thank-A-Mormon Day" from John Reynolds of Biola University.

== Death threats and vandalism ==
Before the vote, Alan Autry (the mayor of Fresno) received an email containing death threats against both himself and Cornerstone Church pastor Jim Franklin. This prompted police to assign officers to protect Franklin and motivated Autry to obtain a bodyguard. According to Fresno's Police Chief Jerry Dyer, the email "did state as to why that threat was made and it was stemming from prop 8." Both Autry and Franklin were prominent Proposition 8 supporters. As of August 12, 2009, no arrests had been made.

In the ten days following the November 4 election, seven houses of worship in Utah and ten LDS Church buildings in the Sacramento area were vandalized, including graffiti and meetinghouse glass doors shattered. According to the LDS Church's spokesperson for the Sacramento area, the vandalism that they were victims of in the ten days after the election was more than they usually get in an entire year. A copy of the Book of Mormon, a Latter-day Saint religious text, was found burning at the front of one of the church's meetinghouses. The FBI investigated these events to determine whether a violation of civil rights had occurred.

Most Holy Reedemer Church, a Catholic parish church in The Castro was vandalized in protest of the Catholic Church's position on the proposition.

The windows on the Sundstrom family vehicle parked at their home in San Jose were painted "Bigots Live Here", "Stop Bigots", and "God Hates Haters". They had a "Protect Marriage Yes on 8" banner. Several people had homes damaged: bricks thrown through house windows, graffiti, and cars damaged.

An affiliate group of the radical trans/queer organization Bash Back! claims credit for pouring glue into the locks of an LDS Church meetinghouse and spray painting its walls. A Web posting signed by Bash Back!'s Olympia chapter said, "The Mormon church (just like most churches) is a cesspool of filth. It is a breeding ground for oppression of all sorts and needs to be confronted, attacked, subverted and destroyed." According to the Chicago Tribune, the acts of vandalism against the Latter-day Saint meetinghouse appeared to be in retaliation for support of Proposition 8.

The Anti-Defamation League released a statement condemning the "defacement and destruction of property."

=== Anthrax hoax ===
In November 2008, the United States Postal Service delivered envelopes containing white powder to the LDS Church's temples in Los Angeles and Salt Lake City and to the national headquarters of the Knights of Columbus in New Haven, Connecticut, prompting a hazardous materials response and a federal domestic terrorism investigation. The envelope to the Knights of Columbus had a postmark from California. Both organizations were heavy backers of Proposition 8. The FBI has determined the substances were not biological agents, and FBI spokesman Special Agent Juan Becerra stated, "We've got to follow the evidence, and at this point we have not received anything that would lead us to believe the opponents of Prop. 8 are behind any kind of terroristic activity. It would be irresponsible to say that at this point." (Anthrax toxin was used in the 2001 anthrax attacks against lawmakers and media members, killing five people. Since then, the FBI has investigated more than 1,000 anthrax hoaxes modeled on the mailings, which usually turn out to be harmless.)

The LDS Church blamed opponents of the marriage ban for sending the hoax mailings. LGBT rights groups, such as Equality Utah and Equality California, have spoken out against the use of violence in protests, and note that the source of the "white powder" mailings has not been determined.

== See also ==
- Americans United for Separation of Church and State
- Californians Against Hate
- Join the Impact
- November 15, 2008 anti-Proposition 8 protests
- Separation of church and state in the United States
