= Fort Deseret =

- U.S. National Register of Historic Places
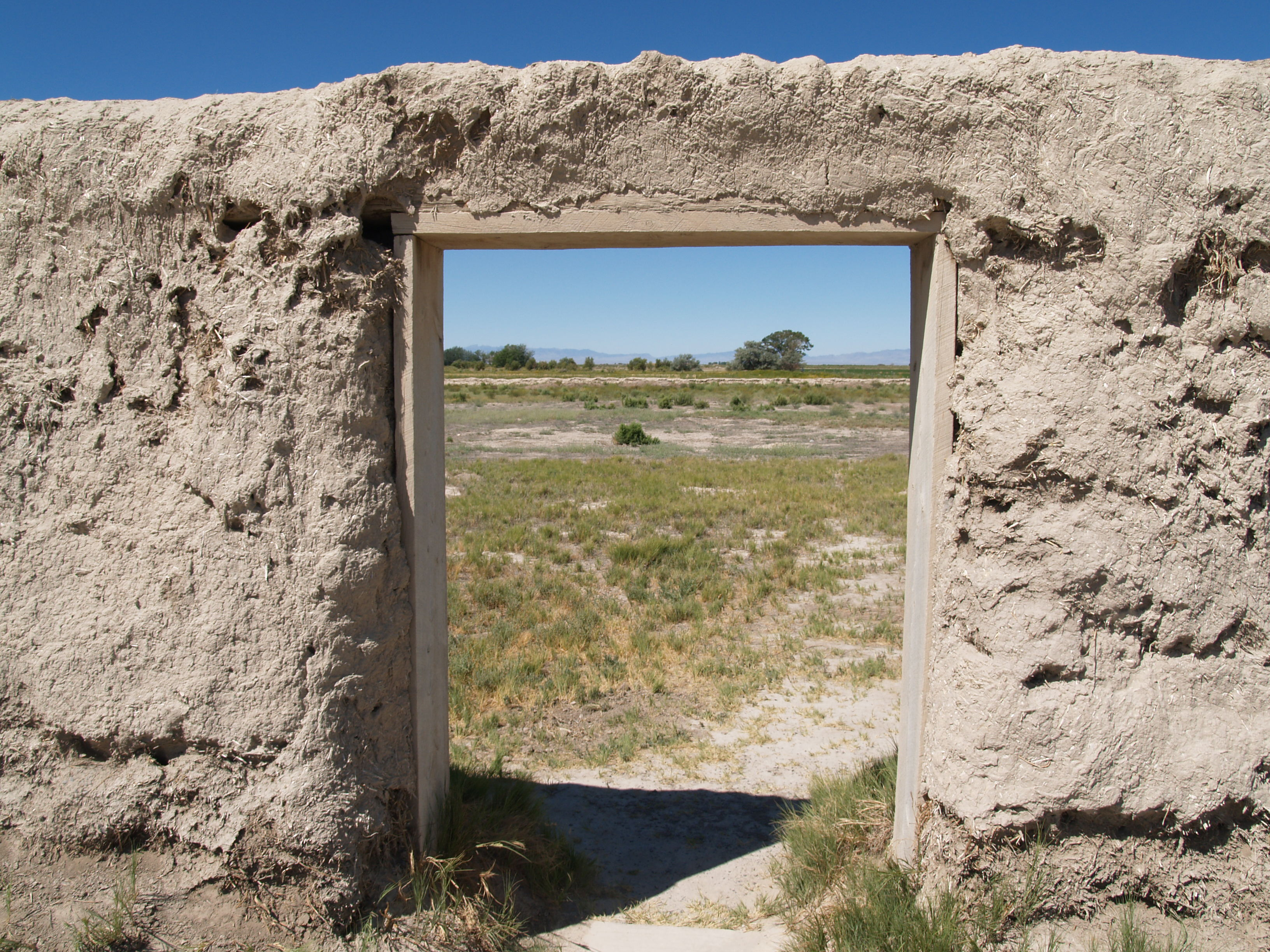
- Entrance to Fort Deseret, August 2008

- Location within Utah Location within the United States
- Location: Millard County, Utah; United States
- Nearest city: Deseret
- Coordinates: 39°15′54″N 112°39′13″W
- Built: 1866
- Architect: John W. Radford
- NRHP reference No.: 70000624
- Added to NRHP: October 9, 1970

Fort Deseret (/ˌdɛzəˈrɛt/) is a former fort located in northeastern Millard County, Utah, United States, just south of Deseret.

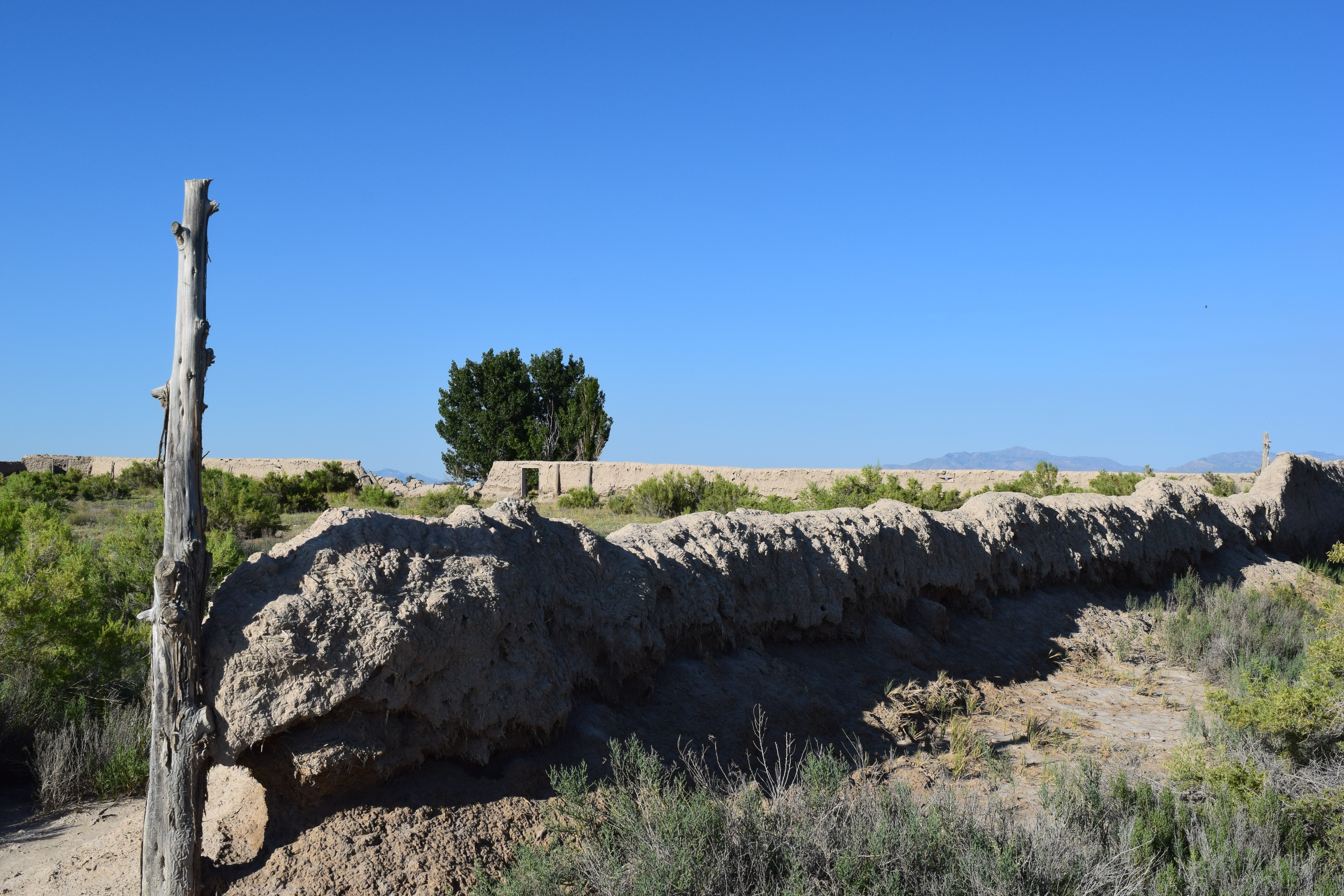
Fort Deseret, June 2016

== Description ==
The fort was built in 1865 during the Utah Black Hawk War to protect settlers in western Utah from the attacks of local Utes. Due to U.S. Army obligations in the Civil War, local settlers were advised to take measures to defend themselves, resulting in the construction of the fort. The 550-foot square fort had 10-foot adobe walls. It proved useful when Black Hawk appeared in 1866 at Deseret demanding cattle. The security provided by the fortification allowed a peaceful settlement to be negotiated. The site was listed on the National Register of Historic Places on October 9, 1970.

== See also ==
- National Register of Historic Places listings in Millard County, Utah
- Cove Fort, another fort, also NRHP-listed
- Moyle House and Indian Tower, another fort, also NRHP-listed
