= Preston Richards =

American Mormon leader

Preston Doremus Richards Sr.

General board of the Young Men's Mutual Improvement Association

Assistant Solicitor of the State Department
- President: William Howard Taft

Utah State Senator

In office
- 1907 – 1907

United States Senate Candidate
- Political party: Republican

Personal details
- Born: September 15, 1881; Mendon, Utah
- Died: January 31, 1952 (aged 70); Salt Lake City, Utah
- Cause of death: Heart ailment
- Resting place: Salt Lake City Cemetery, Salt Lake City, Utah
- Known For: Assistant Solicitor of the State Department, drafted at least one amendment to the US Constitution, authored the proclamation of Arizona's statehood Secured permits and zoning for the Los Angeles California Temple
- Residence: Los Angeles, California
- Education: Juris Doctor
- Alma mater: University of Chicago (Law), Columbia University (Law)
- Occupation: Lawyer
- Employer: Law firm with J. Reuben Clark and Albert E. Bowen
- Title: Partner
- Spouse(s): Barbara Maughan Howell
- Children: 4
- Parents: Willard Richards

Preston D. Richards (September 15, 1881 – January 31, 1952) was an assistant solicitor for the United States Department of State under J. Reuben Clark during the Taft administration. He was also a leader in the Church of Jesus Christ of Latter-day Saints and instrumental in securing the building permits for the Los Angeles California Temple.

== Early life and career ==
Richards, a lawyer, became assistant solicitor of the state department and later formed a private law firm with J. Reuben Clark. Hugh B. Brown would later work for this law firm. Richards was law partners with J. Reuben Clark and Albert E. Bowen.

Richards was an assistant solicitor for the United States Department of State under J. Reuben Clark during the Taft administration. While working in Washington, D.C. he authored the proclamation of Arizona's statehood and wrote the text to at least one constitutional amendment. Richards served as a Utah State Senator during the 1907 legislative session.

== Church service ==
Richards wrote a 1907 biography of early Mormon leader Willard Richards and in 1920, was a member of the general board of the LDS Church's Young Men's Mutual Improvement Association.

Richards worked pro bono to help secure the approvals needed for the construction of the Los Angeles California Temple. Then when the construction was delayed during the Korean War due to steel shortages, Richards and Edward O. Anderson were sent to negotiate with the National Production Authority. The temple was soon designated an ongoing construction project and made exempt from steel rationing requirements. Richards was present at the groundbreaking and helped lead fundraising efforts. He died before seeing the temple's completion.
