= Standing for Something =

- Author: Gordon B. Hinckley
- Genre: Self-improvement
- Publisher: Random House
- Publication date: 2000
- Media type: Print
- Pages: 256
- ISBN: 0-8129-3317-6

Standing for Something: 10 Neglected Virtues That Will Heal Our Hearts and Homes is a self-improvement book by Gordon B. Hinckley, the 15th president of the Church of Jesus Christ of Latter-day Saints. The foreword to the book was written by Emmy Award-winning journalist Mike Wallace, and it bears endorsements by William J. Bennett, Stephen R. Covey, and United States Senator Joe Lieberman.

The book became a New York Times Best Seller in 2000 in the "advice and how-to category," and it received the 2000 Devotional Award from the Association for Mormon Letters.

== The book's ten virtues ==
Hinckley composed ten virtues:

- Virtue 1 - Love: The Lodestar of Life
- Virtue 2 - Where There Is Honesty, Other Virtues Will Follow
- Virtue 3 - Making a Case for Morality
- Virtue 4 - Our Fading Civility
- Virtue 5 - Learning: "With All Thy Getting, get Understanding"
- Virtue 6 - The Twin Virtues of Forgiveness and Mercy
- Virtue 7 - Thrift and Industry: Getting Our Houses in Order
- Virtue 8 - Gratitude: A Sign of Maturity
- Virtue 9 - Optimism in the Face of Cynicism
- Virtue 10 - Faith: Our Only Hope
