= Edwin S. Hinckley =

American geologist (1868–1929)

Edwin S. Hinckley (July 21, 1868 – November 15, 1929) was one of only two men to hold the position of counselor to the president of Brigham Young University. He was a prominent educator and geologist at the university.

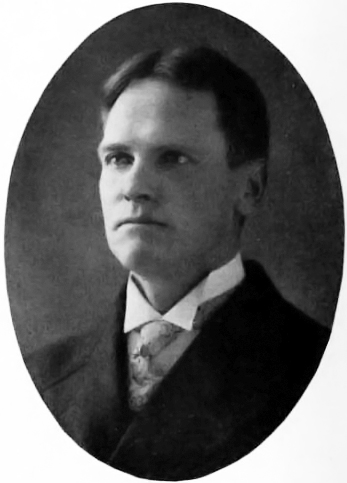
Edwin S. Hinckley in 1911

== Biography ==
Hinckley was the son of Ira N. Hinckley and one of his wives, Adelaide. He was born at Cove Fort, Utah. He attended Brigham Young Academy and graduated from both its high school and collegiate divisions.

In 1890 Hinckley married Adeline Henry.

He pursued higher education at the University of Michigan, and also served as a part-time Mormon missionary in Ann Arbor, Michigan. During his time at the University of Michigan, he and Adeline took in boarders to make ends meet.

He joined the faculty of BYA in 1895. Shortly after this he served for a time as a missionary in Colorado.

From 1904 to 1909, Hinckley served as principal of Brigham Young High School. He also served as counselor to George H. Brimhall and dean of the Church Teachers College. He also was chief geologist at BYU. After retiring from BYU in 1915 he served as superintendent of the state training school in Ogden.

Edwin and Adeline had 13 children. After Hinckley's death his children established a scholarship in his honor at BYU. Other scholarships were established in his honor at Weber State University, Utah State University and the University of Utah. All these were also established by his children.
