= Alonzo A. Hinckley =

Member of the Quorum of the Twelve Apostles

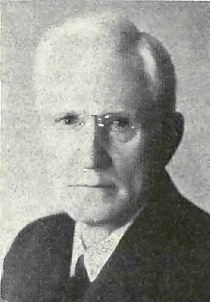

Quorum of the Twelve Apostles
- October 11, 1934 – December 22, 1936

LDS Church Apostle
- October 11, 1934 – December 22, 1936
- Reason: Death of Anthony W. Ivins; David O. McKay added to First Presidency
- Reorganization at end of term: Albert E. Bowen ordained

Personal details
- Born: Alonzo Arza Hinckley; April 23, 1870; Cove Fort, Utah Territory, United States
- Died: December 22, 1936 (aged 66); Salt Lake City, Utah, United States
- Cause of death: stomach cancer
- Resting place: Salt Lake City Cemetery; 40°46′37.92″N 111°51′28.8″W
- Spouse(s): Rose M. Robison
- Parents: Ira N. Hinckley; Angeline W. Noble

Alonzo Arza Hinckley (April 23, 1870 – December 22, 1936) was a member of the Quorum of the Twelve Apostles of the Church of Jesus Christ of Latter-day Saints (LDS Church) from 1934 until his death.

Hinckley was born in Cove Fort, Utah Territory, to Ira Hinckley and Angeline Wilcox Noble. He married his wife Rose May Robison in 1892 in the Manti Temple. Hinckley served as an LDS Church missionary in the Netherlands.

On August 11, 1912, during a conference in Millard County, Utah, Hinckley was selected to be president of the newly formed Deseret Stake, which was located in the western half of Millard County, Utah. He had been serving as president of the Millard Stake before that. He was stake president for 27 years. Followimg this from 1932-1935 he was president of the California Mission.

Hinckley for a time served as a member of the Utah State legislature. He was also Utah Commissioner of Agriculture for five tears.

Hinckley was ordained an apostle on October 11, 1934, to fill a vacancy in the Quorum of the Twelve Apostles created by elevation of David O. McKay to the First Presidency following the death of Anthony W. Ivins.

Hinckley died of stomach cancer on December 22, 1936, in Salt Lake City. He was buried at Salt Lake City Cemetery. He was succeeded in the Quorum of the Twelve by Albert E. Bowen.

Hinckley was the uncle of LDS Church president Gordon B. Hinckley.

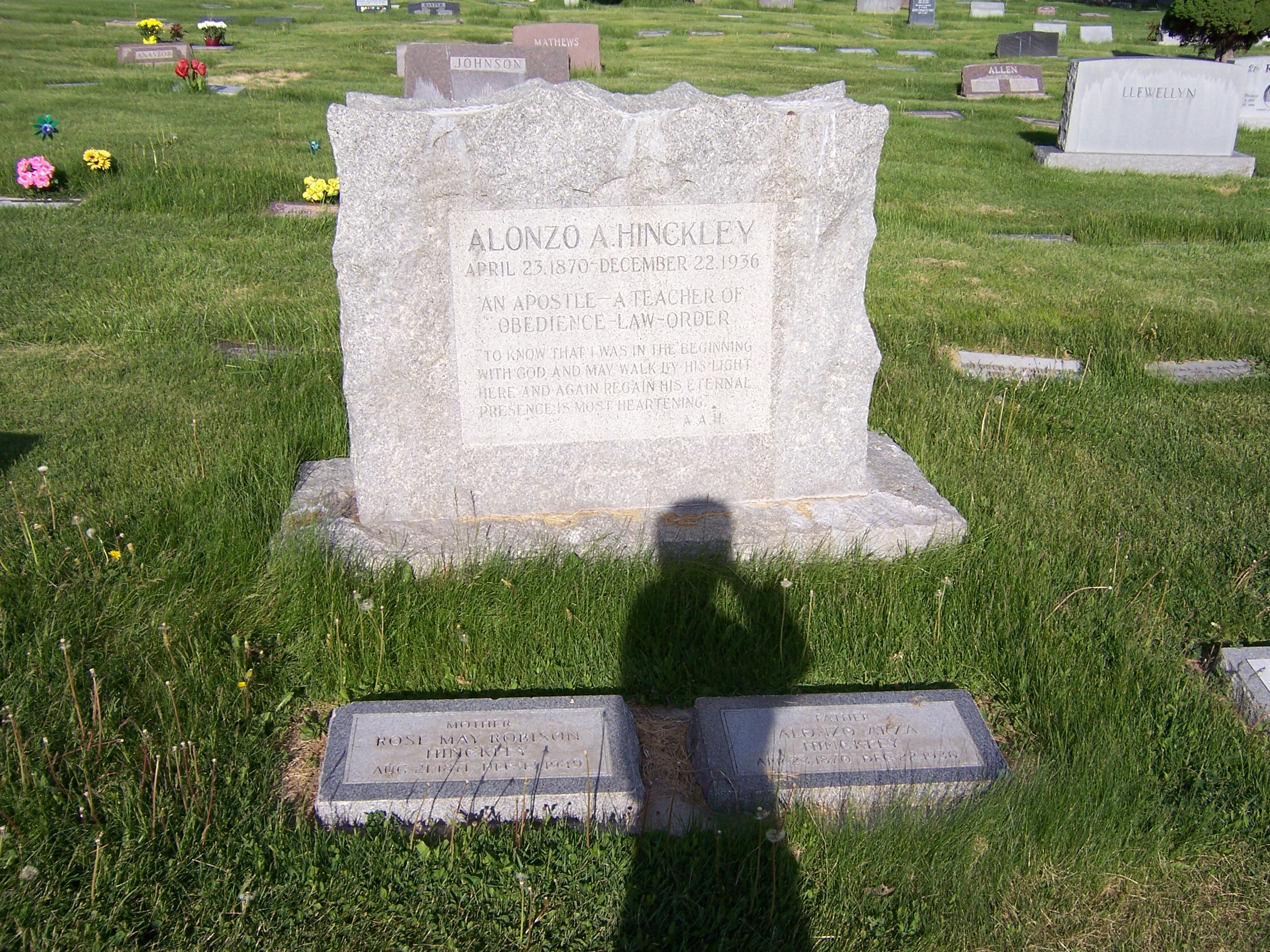
Grave marker of Alonzo A. Hinckley.

The Church of Jesus Christ of Latter-day Saints titles
Preceded by J. Reuben Clark	Quorum of the Twelve Apostles; October 11, 1934 – December 22, 1936	Succeeded by Albert E. Bowen
