= Mo-Sai =

Precast concrete cladding panels

Mo-Sai is a method of producing precast concrete cladding panels. It was patented by John Joseph Earley in 1940. The Mo-Sai institute later refined Earley's method and became the leader in exposed aggregate concrete. The Mo-Sai Institute, an organization of precast concrete manufacturers, adhered to the Mo-Sai method of producing the exposed aggregate precast concrete panels.

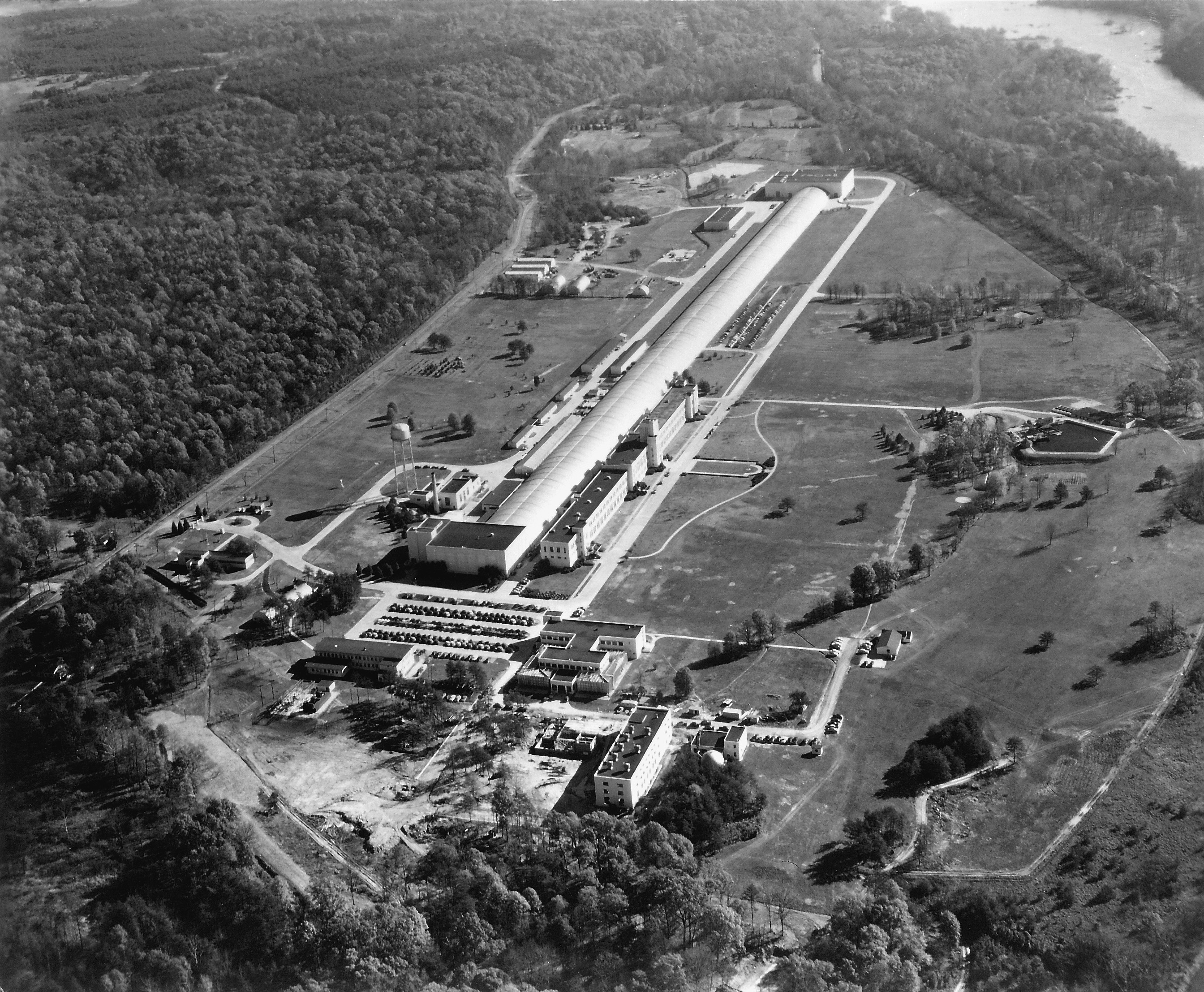
David Taylor Model Basin, 1946

A pivotal development in this technique occurred in 1938, when the administration buildings at the David Taylor Model Basin were built with panels used as permanent forms for cast-in-place walls. This was the first use of the Mo-Sai manufacturing technique produced in collaboration with the Dextrone Company of New Haven, Connecticut. Working from this background, the Dextone Company refined and obtained patents and copyrights in 1940 for the methods under which the Mo-Sai Associates, later known as Mo-Sai Institute Inc. The Mo-Sai Institute grew to include a number of licensed manufacturing firms throughout the United States.

Buildings featuring Mo-Sai panels include the Columbine Building in Colorado Springs (1960), Prudential Building in Toronto, Ontario, Canada (1960), Denver Hilton Hotel (now the Sheraton Denver) in Denver, Colorado (1960), Los Angeles Temple (1956), Equitable Center in Portland, Oregon (1964), the Hartford National Bank and Trust Hartford, CT (1967) and the PanAm Building in New York City (1962).
