= Moyle House and Indian Tower =

Historic house in Utah, United States

- U.S. National Register of Historic Places
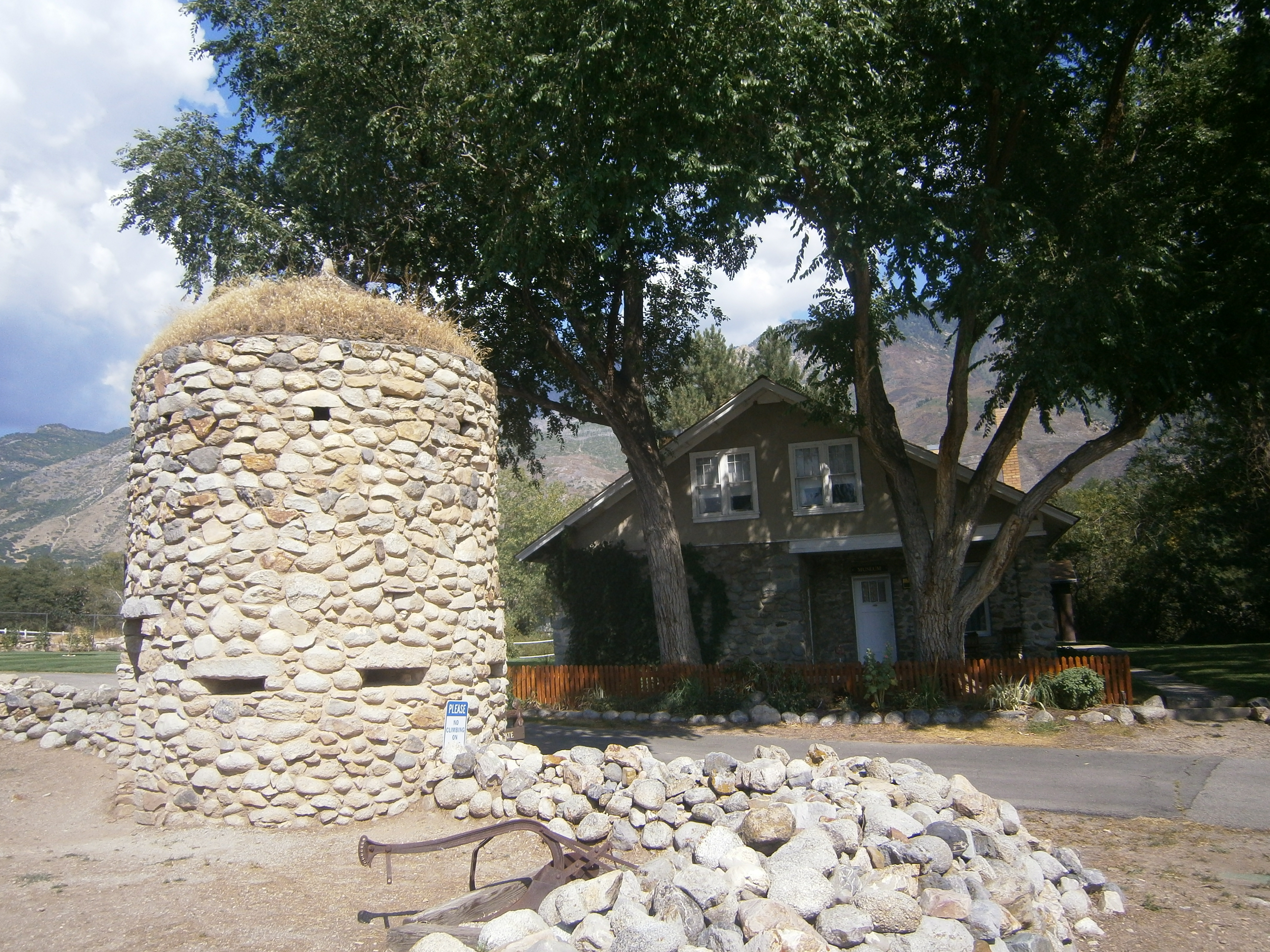
- View of the tower and house looking to the east, August 2017

- Location within Utah Location within the United States
- Location: 606 East 770 North; Alpine, Utah; United States
- Coordinates: 40°27′52″N 111°45′58″W
- Area: 2.5 acres (1.0 ha)
- Built: 1858, 1917
- Built by: Moyle, John Rowe; Moyle, Joseph E.
- Architectural style: Mid 19th Century Revival, Bungalow/craftsman
- NRHP reference No.: 92001689
- Added to NRHP: December 23, 1992

The Moyle House and Indian Tower is a historic residence and watchtower in Alpine, Utah, United States, that is listed on the National Register of Historic Places.

== Description ==
The house is located at 606 East 770 North, on the northeast side of the Moyle Historical Park.

The house was expanded in 1859-1860 from a c.1858 dugout house. The tower, built during 1860–1866, was built as a private fort for defense against Indians of the Black Hawk War of 1865–1868, and is the only such tower known to have been built for protection of a single household in Utah. These stone structures were built by English-born mason and Mormon, John Rowe Moyle. His son Joseph Moyle expanded the house in 1917, adding Bungalow/Craftsman elements. A dugout/food cellar also was built during c.1858–60. These three structures are included in the NRHP listing.

John Moyle also built a home for a second wife in a nearby property, not part of the NRHP listing.

See also Fort Deseret and Cove Fort, also NRHP-listed, also private forts.

The property was listed on the National Register of Historic Places December 23, 1992. The listing included two contributing buildings and one contributing structure on 2.5 acres (1.0 ha).

== See also ==
- National Register of Historic Places listings in Utah County, Utah
- Cove Fort, another NRHP-listed private fort
- Fort Deseret, another NRHP-listed private fort
