= Emma Lucy Gates Bowen =

American opera singer

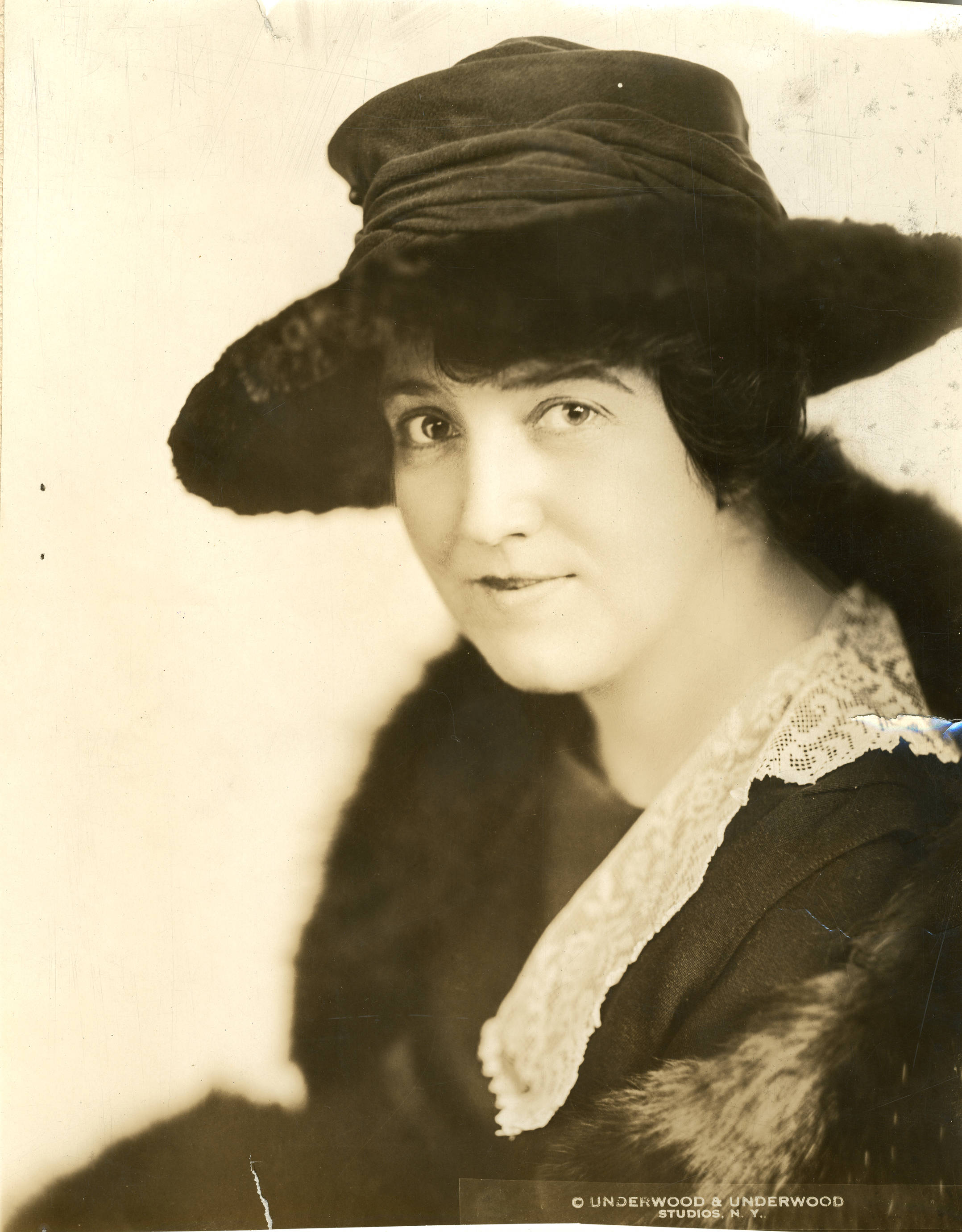
- Lucy Gates studio portrait
- Born: Emma Lucy Ann Gates; November 5, 1882; St. George, Utah Territory
- Died: April 30, 1951 (aged 68); Salt Lake City, Utah
- Occupation: Singer
- Spouse: Albert E. Bowen
- Parent: Susa Young Gates
- Relatives: Brigham Young (grandfather); B. Cecil Gates (brother)

Emma Lucy Ann Gates Bowen (November 5, 1882 – April 30, 1951) was an American opera singer and later the wife of Albert E. Bowen, a member of the Quorum of the Twelve Apostles of the Church of Jesus Christ of Latter-day Saints (LDS Church). She was often referred to as Lucy Gates and after her marriage as Lucy Gates Bowen or Lucy Bowen.

== Early life and education ==
Emma Lucy Gates was born to Jacob Forsberry Gates and Susa Young, in St. George, Utah Territory. She was a granddaughter of Brigham Young and Lucy Bigelow Young. She was baptized at age 8 in the Pacific Ocean, as her parents had brought the family to Hawaii while serving a mission for the church.

Emma Lucy Gates at age 15

Gates did not begin her formal musical studies until the age of 12. At age 14, she won a piano competition at an eisteddfod held in Salt Lake City. She studied both violin and piano as well as vocal performance. In 1898, she traveled to Göttingen, Germany to study. The next year she began studies at the Berlin Conservatory, but later began private studies under Blanche Corelli.

== Career ==
After several years of study, Gates received her first major contract with the Royal Opera of Berlin and made her debut on April 17, 1909, appearing as Ännchen in a production of Der Freischütz. One of her most frequent roles there was as Philine in Ambroise Thomas's Mignon. In addition to performing standard repertoire, she was part of the cast for the debut staging of Poia by American composer Arthur Nevin in 1910. The following year, she moved to the Kassel Royal Opera to become its prima coloratura soprano.

Her European career was interrupted by the outbreak of World War I, and she spent a year in New York patching together enough engagements to support herself. Among other roles, this included the opportunity to appear as the soprano soloist in the premiere of Harriet Ware's Undine (variously called a tone poem or one-act opera).

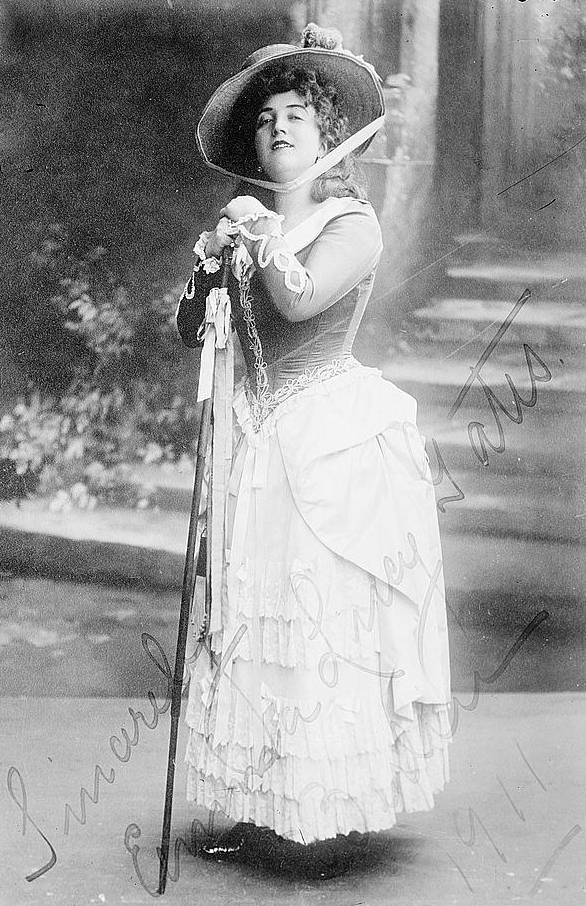
Lucy Gates in costume

Italian Street Song
1916 Columbia recording of Lucy Gates singing "Italian Street Song" from Victor Herbert's Naughty Marietta

Returning to Utah in 1915, Gates formed the Lucy Gates Grand Opera Company with her brother B. Cecil Gates. After her marriage in 1916, she continued performing in operas and did recordings with Columbia Records. She appeared in La traviata in Newark in 1919, the part of Violetta being the role she considered her favorite. She sang at the Brooklyn Academy of Music in 1920, and at New York's Aeolian Hall in 1920 and 1922.

In 1928, Lucy Bowen served as an alternate delegate to the Republican National Convention from Utah. In 1937, her husband Albert Bowen was called as a member of the Quorum of the Twelve Apostles of the LDS Church and it was about this time that Lucy ended most of her public music appearances, although she continued teaching those seeking to enter opera until her death. Her last public concert appearance was in 1948.

== Personal life and legacy ==
In July 1916, Lucy Gates married widower Albert E. Bowen. Lucy and Albert Bowen did not have any children together, but she raised his twin sons from his first marriage. Bowen died in Salt Lake City of a cerebral hemorrhage on April 30, 1951, leaving her husband a widower for the second time.

Not long after her death, Bowen was included as one of the 24 women for whom new student apartment buildings at Brigham Young University, known collectively as Heritage Halls, would be named. (The apartments were torn down in the 2000s and replaced with new buildings which no longer have names commemorating these women.) There are collections of her papers in the Utah State Historical Society and at Brigham Young University.

== See also ==
- Descendants of Brigham Young
