= Los Angeles California Temple =

Latter-day Saints Church in Los Angeles, California, USA

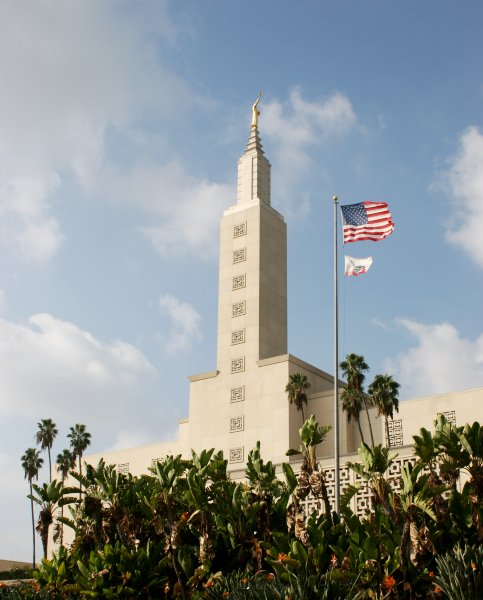
- Interactive map of Los Angeles California Temple
- Number: 10
- Dedication: March 11, 1956, by David O. McKay
- Site: 13 acres (5.3 ha)
- Floor area: 190,614 ft^{2} (17,708.6 m^{2})
- Height: 257 ft (78 m)
- Official website • News & images

Church chronology
← Bern Switzerland Temple	Los Angeles California Temple	→ Hamilton New Zealand Temple

Additional information
- Announced: March 6, 1937, by Heber J. Grant
- Groundbreaking: September 22, 1951, by David O. McKay
- Open house: December 19, 1955 – February 18, 1956
- Designed by: Edward O. Anderson
- Location: Los Angeles, California, United States
- Coordinates: 34°3′10.1″N 118°26′2.1″W
- Exterior finish: Mo-Sai stone facing
- Design: Modern, single-tower design
- Baptistries: 1
- Ordinance rooms: 4 (four-stage progressive)
- Sealing rooms: 10
- Clothing rental: Yes
- Visitors' center: Yes

The Los Angeles California Temple (formerly the Los Angeles Temple), the tenth operating and the second-largest temple operated by the Church of Jesus Christ of Latter-day Saints (LDS Church), is on Santa Monica Boulevard in the Westwood district of Los Angeles, California, United States.

When it was dedicated in 1956, it was the largest of the church's temples, though it has since been surpassed by the Salt Lake Temple due to later expansions. The temple serves 39 stakes in Los Angeles, Ventura, Kern, Santa Barbara, and San Luis Obispo counties. The grounds include a visitors' center, which was renovated in 2010, the Los Angeles Regional Family History Center, both of which are open to the public, and the headquarters of the church's California Los Angeles Mission.

== History ==
The Los Angeles Temple was announced on March 23, 1937, by church president Heber J. Grant, when the church purchased 24.23 acres (98,000 m^{2}) from the Harold Lloyd Motion Picture Company. Construction was to begin soon thereafter, but financial difficulties relating to the Great Depression and World War II delayed its construction.

Construction was again delayed during the Korean War due to steel shortages. Preston Richards and Edward O. Anderson were sent to negotiate with the National Production Authority. The temple was soon designated an ongoing construction project and made exempt from steel rationing requirements. Richards was present at the groundbreaking and helped lead fundraising efforts. Richards died before seeing the temple's completion. The groundbreaking took place in 1951. The temple plans were revised at this time to include a priesthood assembly room, an unusual feature in temples built after the Salt Lake Temple. It was also expanded to accommodate an unprecedented 300 patrons per session.

This was the first temple with an angel Moroni statue since the Salt Lake Temple. When the statue was installed it faced southeast, as the temple does. It was later turned to face due east at the request of church president David O. McKay. This was the last temple designed to use live actors instead of a film to present the endowment. The motion-picture presentation soon replaced the live actor presentation, and the progressive presentation (in which patrons moved from one room to another) was replaced with stationary ordinance rooms (i.e., patrons remained in a single room for the entire ceremony). In 2003, the temple reverted to a progressive-style presentation of the endowment (but still using a film) and completely renovated the Terrestrial room.

The Los Angeles California Temple was closed for renovations in late November 2005, with reopening originally scheduled for May 2006, but eventually delayed until July 11, 2006. The renovation also included a seismic overhaul and a complete redesign and reconstruction of the baptistry, which had long been plagued by mold due to poor ventilation. In 2012 a fire damaged an adjacent building under-construction that was to house the mission president.

In 2020, like all the church's others, the Los Angeles California Temple was closed for a time in response to the COVID-19 pandemic.

== Setting ==
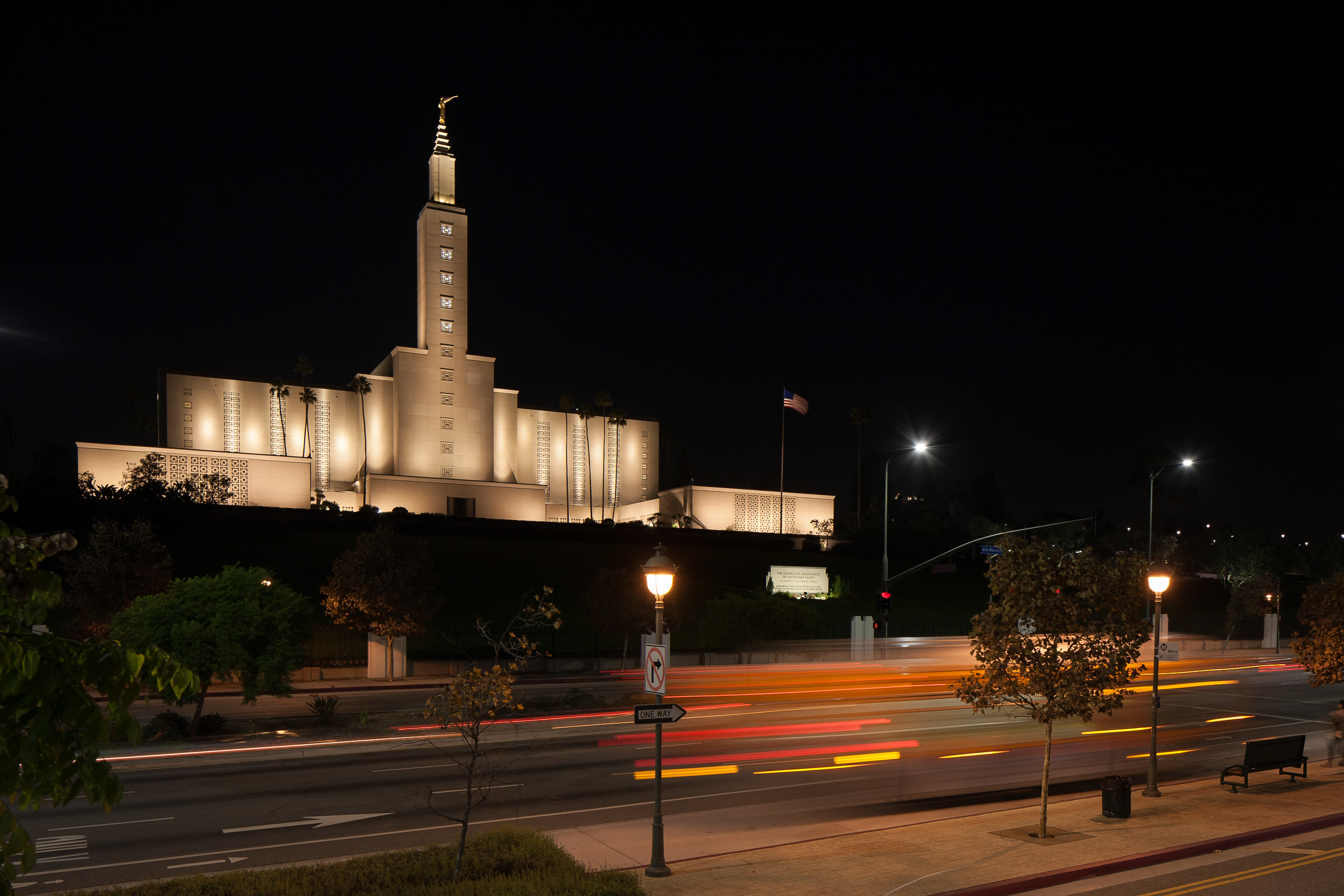
The Los Angeles Temple at night

Located at 10777 W. Santa Monica Boulevard in the Westwood district of Los Angeles, the temple sits atop a small hill above the intersection of Overland Avenue and Santa Monica Boulevard. The well manicured grounds are open to the public and are filled with various plants, including Canary Island Pine trees, several varieties of palm trees, Bird of Paradise trees, olive trees, and rare Chinese Ginkgo trees. At the left and right of the temple are two fountains, and at the front is a large reflection pool. Several family-themed statues further beautify the grounds. In December, the temple grounds are decorated with thousands of multi-colored lights in celebration of Christmas.

While not as regionally prominent as the temples in Oakland, San Diego, and outside of Washington, D.C., the temple is still a distinctive feature of the westside of Los Angeles. Numerous church facilities are on its grounds including a meetinghouse, a baseball field, the headquarters of the church's California Los Angeles Mission, and apartments (used by missionaries, temple workers, temple patrons, and visiting church officials).

The remaining land of the million-square-foot lot, along Manning Avenue, was subdivided for residential lots, the sale of which considerably offset the expense of constructing the temple. Along with the Bern Switzerland Temple, dedicated a few months before, these were the church's first temples built outside of an LDS Church-dominated area. The Los Angeles Temple was the first temple explicitly designed for automobile accessibility: with its parking facilities being larger than those of any temple built previously and with no direct pedestrian connection between the front doors and Santa Monica Boulevard.

== Architecture ==
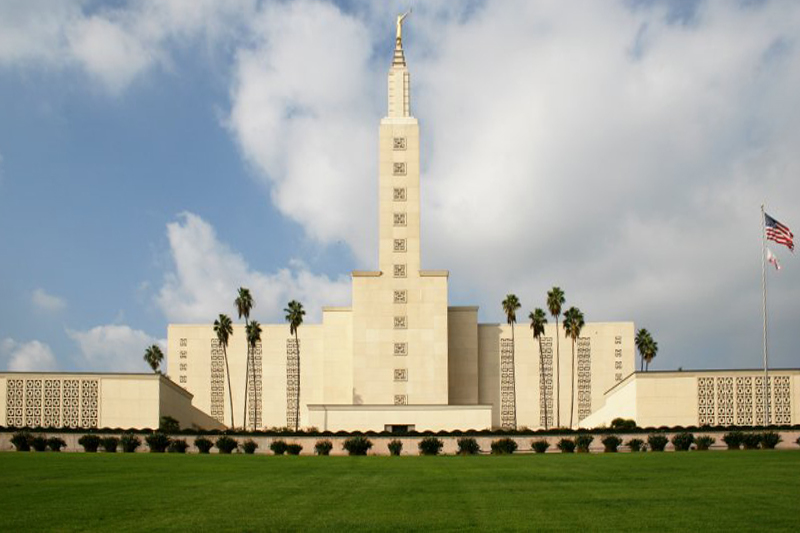
The Los Angeles Temple in 2006

The temple's architecture is generally Modernist, an aesthetic that extends to the choice of exterior cladding: 146,000 square feet (14,000 m^{2}) of Mo-Sai pre-cast concrete facing, a mixture of crushed quartz and white Portland cement quarried in Utah and Nevada. The temple is 369 feet (112 m) long, 269 feet (82 m) wide and has an overall height of 257 feet (78 m). Atop the temple stands a 16-foot (5 m) tall statue of the angel Moroni. The building's architect, Edward O. Anderson, patterned it after Mayan architecture.

The rooms include a baptistry, celestial room, four ordinance rooms, ten sealing rooms, and an assembly room that stretches the entire length of the temple. The Los Angeles Temple also includes two 30-foot (9 m) pools on each side of the connected side buildings. The Los Angeles Temple features murals on the walls of its progressive-style ordinance rooms, including the celestial room. The only other temples with celestial room murals are the Idaho Falls Idaho Temple and the first New Zealand Temple.

== See also ==
Temples in the Los Angeles metropolitan
area
California Temples
Temples in California
- = Operating
- = Under construction
- = Announced
- = Temporarily Closed

- Comparison of temples of The Church of Jesus Christ of Latter-day Saints
- List of temples of The Church of Jesus Christ of Latter-day Saints
- List of temples of The Church of Jesus Christ of Latter-day Saints by geographic region
- Temple architecture (Latter-day Saints)
- The Church of Jesus Christ of Latter-day Saints in California
- Protests against Proposition 8 supporters
