= What of the Mormons? =

What of the Mormons?: A Brief Study of the Church of Jesus Christ of Latter-day Saints
- 1949 edition
- Author: Gordon B. Hinckley
- Language: English
- Publisher: The Church of Jesus Christ of Latter-day Saints
- Publication date: 1947
- Publication place: United States
- Pages: 223

What of the Mormons?: A Brief Study of the Church of Jesus Christ of Latter-day Saints is a 1947 book by Gordon B. Hinckley, that was published by the Church of Jesus Christ of Latter-day Saints (LDS Church). Portions of the book continue to be published by the LDS Church under the title Truth Restored: A Short History of The Church of Jesus Christ of Latter-day Saints.

Hinckley wrote What of the Mormons? while he was employed as the Executive Secretary to the Church Radio, Publicity, and Mission Literature Committee. As part of the celebration of the 100th anniversary of the Mormon pioneers arriving in the Salt Lake Valley, Hinckley had been asked by church president George Albert Smith to write a book that would introduce the LDS Church to non-members.

The book was divided into two sections: "The Mormons Today: A Contemporary Picture" and "The Mormons Yesterday: Their History". The book included numerous black-and-white photographs and illustrations.

The book went through a number of editions in the 1940s and 1950s. In 1976, the LDS Church failed to renew the copyright to What of the Mormons? and it therefore became part of the public domain in the United States. Beginning in 1969, the LDS Church began publishing the historical part of What of the Mormons? under the title Truth Restored. Hinckley went on to become a church apostle and was later its president from 1995 until his death in 2008.
