= Gordon B. Hinckley =

American religious leader and author (1910–2008)

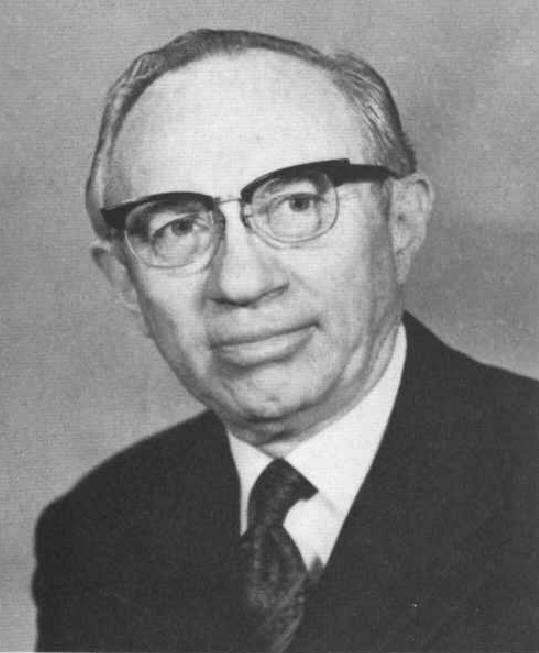
- Hinckley in 1976

15th President of the Church of Jesus Christ of Latter-day Saints
- March 12, 1995 – January 27, 2008
- Predecessor: Howard W. Hunter
- Successor: Thomas S. Monson

President of the Quorum of the Twelve Apostles (with Boyd K. Packer as Acting President)
- June 5, 1994 – March 12, 1995
- Predecessor: Howard W. Hunter
- Successor: Thomas S. Monson
- End reason: Became President of the Church

First Counselor in the First Presidency
- June 5, 1994 – March 3, 1995
- Called by: Howard W. Hunter
- Successor: Thomas S. Monson
- End reason: Dissolution of First Presidency on the death of Hunter

First Counselor in the First Presidency
- November 10, 1985 – May 30, 1994
- Called by: Ezra Taft Benson
- Predecessor: Marion G. Romney
- End reason: Dissolution of First Presidency on the death of Benson

Second Counselor in the First Presidency
- December 2, 1982 – November 5, 1985
- Called by: Spencer W. Kimball
- Predecessor: Marion G. Romney
- Successor: Thomas S. Monson
- End reason: Dissolution of First Presidency on the death of Kimball

Counselor in the First Presidency
- July 23, 1981 – December 2, 1982
- Called by: Spencer W. Kimball
- End reason: Called as Second Counselor in the First Presidency

Quorum of the Twelve Apostles
- October 5, 1961 – July 23, 1981
- Called by: David O. McKay
- End reason: Called as a Counselor in the First Presidency

LDS Church Apostle
- October 5, 1961 – January 27, 2008
- Called by: David O. McKay
- Reason: Hugh B. Brown added to First Presidency
- Reorganization at end of term: D. Todd Christofferson ordained

Assistant to the Quorum of the Twelve Apostles
- April 6, 1958 – October 5, 1961
- Called by: David O. McKay
- End reason: Called to the Quorum of the Twelve Apostles

Personal details
- Born: Gordon Bitner Hinckley; June 23, 1910; Salt Lake City, Utah, U.S.
- Died: January 27, 2008 (aged 97); Salt Lake City, Utah, U.S.
- Resting place: Salt Lake City Cemetery; 40.774497°N 111.86348°W
- Education: University of Utah (BA)
- Spouse(s): Marjorie Pay (m. 1937; died 2004)
- Children: 5; including Virginia
- Awards: Presidential Medal of Freedom; Silver Buffalo Award
- Website: gordonbhinckley.org
- Signature

Gordon Bitner Hinckley (June 23, 1910 – January 27, 2008) was an American religious leader and author who served as the 15th president of the Church of Jesus Christ of Latter-day Saints (LDS Church) from March 1995 until his death in January 2008 at age 97. Considered a prophet, seer, and revelator by church members, Hinckley was the oldest person to preside over the church in its history until Russell M. Nelson surpassed his age in 2022.

Hinckley's presidency was noted for the building of temples, with more than half of existing temples being built under his leadership. He also oversaw the reconstruction of the Nauvoo Illinois Temple and the building of the 21,000 seat Conference Center. During his tenure, "The Family: A Proclamation to the World" was issued and the Perpetual Education Fund was established. At the time of his death, approximately one-third of the church's membership had joined the church under Hinckley's leadership.

Hinckley was awarded ten honorary doctorate degrees, and in 2004 the Presidential Medal of Freedom by George W. Bush. He also received the Boy Scouts of America's highest award, the Silver Buffalo, and served as chairman of the Church Boards of Trustees/Education. Hinckley died of natural causes on January 27, 2008. His wife, Marjorie Pay, died in 2004. He was succeeded as church president by Thomas S. Monson, who had served as his first counselor in the First Presidency, and, more importantly, was the President of the Quorum of the Twelve Apostles; according to LDS doctrine and practice, Monson was Hinckley's anticipated successor.

== Early years ==
Hinckley was born on June 23, 1910, in Salt Lake City, Utah, to prominent LDS writer and educator Bryant S. Hinckley and his wife Ada Bitner. He grew up on a residential farm in East Millcreek. His home library contained approximately 1,000 volumes of literature, philosophy and history. He graduated from LDS High School in 1928, then attended the University of Utah, where he majored in English literature and minored in Latin and ancient Greek, graduating with a B.A. in 1932. Hinckley became a missionary for the LDS Church, an unusual occurrence for Depression-era Latter-day Saints. He served in the London-based British Mission from 1933 to 1935. He later wrote the words for LDS hymn no. 135, "My Redeemer Lives".

== Church employment ==
Hinckley returned to the United States in 1935 after completing a short tour of the European continent, including preaching in both Berlin and Paris. He was given an assignment by his mission president, Joseph F. Merrill, to meet with the church's First Presidency and request that better materials be made available to missionaries for proselytizing. As a result of this meeting, Hinckley received employment as executive secretary of the church's Radio, Publicity and Missionary Literature Committee (he had received schooling as a journalist in college). Hinckley's responsibilities included developing the church's fledgling radio broadcasts and making use of the era's new communication technologies.

One of the projects Hinckley oversaw in the late 1930s was development of the church's exhibit for the Golden Gate International Exposition.

In 1935 Hinckley also worked as a seminary teacher for the Church Educational System. He however decided to focus solely on the work with the Radio, Publicity and missionary literature committee.

Starting in 1937, he served on the Sunday School General Board. After the Second World War, during which he left full-time LDS Church employ to work for a time with the Denver and Rio Grande Western Railroad, Hinckley served as executive secretary to the church's Missionary Committee. He also served as the church's liaison to Deseret Book, working with Deseret Book's liaison to the church, Thomas S. Monson. At various times, especially in the late 1940s, Hinckley was also a reporter for the Church News, a publication of the Deseret News.

In the early 1950s, Hinckley was part of a committee that considered how to present the temple ordinances at the Swiss Temple. The concern was how this could be done when a need existed to provide them in at least 10 languages; the concern was eventually solved through the use of a film version of the endowment.

Hinckley's background in journalism and public relations prepared him well to preside over the church during a time when it had received increasing media coverage. He had learned to use new technology to spread the word of God, developed positive relationships with people of other faiths, and studied and written works of Church history. These experiences would serve as a foundation for the service he would give for the rest of his life.

In 1957, Hinckley was named to the board of directors of KSL. Shortly after he was named to the executive committee of the board.

== Family ==
On April 29, 1937, Hinckley married Marjorie Pay (November 23, 1911 – April 6, 2004) in the Salt Lake Temple. They had five children, including Richard G. Hinckley, an LDS Church general authority between 2005 and 2011, and Virginia Hinckley Pearce, a former member of the church's Young Women general presidency.

Another of their daughters, Kathleen Hinckley Barnes Walker, co-authored several children's books with Virginia and ran an events company. Her first husband, Alan Barnes, died in 2001 and in 2004 she married M. Richard Walker. The Walkers served from 2005 to 2008 as president and matron of the Salt Lake Temple and lived in Preston, England, from 2011 to 2013, while Richard served as president of the Missionary Training Center.

Hinckley's other son, Clark, has also served in several church leadership positions, including stake president, president of the church's Spain Barcelona Mission (2009 to 2012), and the first president of the Tijuana Mexico Temple (2015 to 2018).

== LDS Church service ==
=== Local leadership ===
After returning to East Millcreek at the end of employment with the railroad, Hinckley was called as a counselor in the presidency of the church's East Millcreek Stake. He later served as president of that stake, until about six months after his call as an Assistant to the Quorum of the Twelve Apostles. During his time as stake president Hinckley oversaw the building of several chapels.

=== General authority ===
In the April 1958 general conference, Hinckley became a church general authority as an Assistant to the Quorum of the Twelve Apostles, a position that was later discontinued. One of his first assignments as a general authority was participating in the dedication the same month of the New Zealand Temple. In August 1958, Hinckley traveled to England, where he was involved in the London Temple open house and dedication. As a general authority, Hinckley continued to work with the missionary department, and after the death of ___ (name needed) Richards, he worked closely with Henry D. Moyle.

In early 1960, Hinckley was given responsibility for overseeing LDS Church operations in Asia. His first trip there in the spring of 1960 lasted two months and involved going to Japan, Hong Kong, Taiwan, South Korea, and the Philippines. In the Philippines, he worked on getting government approval for missionaries to be sent. He returned to Asia on a second trip in April 1961, which included a meeting to inaugurate missionary work in the Philippines. During this trip he also was in Seoul, South Korea during the May 16 coup. Hinckley wired a story on the coup to the Deseret News.

In June 1961, Hinckley was one of the general authority presenters at the first Missionary President training seminar and was involved in the presentation of the first standardized missionary lesson plan.

In September 1961, Hinckley became an apostle in the Quorum of the Twelve Apostles. He filled a vacancy created by Hugh B. Brown being added to the First Presidency as the third counselor to David O. McKay.

After his call as an apostle, Hinckley continued to be a leader in the missionary department, with Boyd K. Packer serving as one of his key aides. Hinckley was also appointed the chair of the all-church coordinating council's children's section.

Hinckley also continued to oversee the church's operations in Asia. In February 1962, he made the first trip to Asia on which he was accompanied by his wife, Marjorie. On the trip, they visited the Philippines, Hong Kong, Taiwan, Japan, and South Korea. On his return, he held training seminars with missionaries in California and Illinois in co-operation with Moyle, and he later held training seminars in all 23 missions in Europe. The seminars were credited with being the main force behind higher rates of conversion over the coming summer.

Also in 1962, Hinckley was involved in the negotiations that lead to the LDS Church purchasing the shortwave radio station WRUL.

Meanwhile, Hinckley also dedicated a chapel in French Polynesia on the island of Huahine. A group of Latter-day Saints returned to their home island on their boat, which sank with 15 drowning. Hinckley canceled his return to Utah and took a voyage on a sailing vessel to preside at the funeral.

In late 1963, Hinckley made another tour of the Philippines, Japan and South Korea, this time bringing not only his wife but also their 10-year-old daughter. In the spring of 1964, the Improvement Era published a series or articles on the church in Asia and identified Hinckley as president of the "Hawaiian-Oriental Missions".

In 1964, Hinckley was appointed a board member of KIRO-TV and KIRO-AM/FM, which the LDS Church had just purchased. When the church formed Bonneville International Corporation later in 1964, Hinckley was named a vice president, a member of the board of directors, and a member of the executive committee.

Hinckley circumnavigated the world on a trip with his wife in late 1964. He first stopped in Tokyo for a missionary conference. He then traveled to South Korea, Hong Kong, and the Philippines, as he had before. Next, he went to Thailand and held a meeting with the few church members, all of whom were expatriates, in the country at the time. Hinckley then traveled to Saigon and met with about 60 church members, mostly American military personnel. There were two Vietnamese citizens who had joined the LDS Church at the meeting in Saigon. Finally, he visited Singapore and then went to India.

In India, he went to Madras and then Coimbatore, where Hinckley met Paul Thirithuvodoss, who had written to the church headquarters to ask for baptism. Hinckley went to Medukerai to see a school run by Thirithuvodoss. Hinckley decided not to baptize Thirithuvodoss at the time.

The Hinckleys then traveled to Beirut, where they met with a small group of church members, and then on to Jerusalem. From there, they traveled to Greece, where they met with another small group of church members. They then proceeded to Frankfurt, where they stayed in the home of Ezra Taft Benson, who presided the European Mission, and his wife, Flora. The Hinckleys then went to Brussels before they returned to Utah.

In July 1965, Hinckley went to Hawaii, where he was involved with the first LDS temple services in Japanese.

Also in 1965, Hinckley was involved in negotiations with United States Selective Service officials that led to the establishment of a quota of one LDS missionary, who would otherwise be drafted, being able to leave from a ward or branch every six months, with the quota transferable within any given LDS district or stake.

In the late 1960s, Hinckley was a key person in formulating official LDS Church statements, such as the 1968 statement on the sale of liquor by the drink.

In the early 1970s, Hinckley served as chair of the executive committee of the Church Board of Education.

In 1972, Hinckley became the initial head of the LDS Church's public affairs department. In September 1972, Hinckley and his wife traveled with church president Harold B. Lee and his wife, Joan, on a tour of the United Kingdom, Greece, Israel, and Italy. The visit included meetings with church members in Rome; a group of LDS youth at an event at the Santa Severa resort on the coast of the Tyrrhenian Sea; and meetings with Church members in Florence, Pisa and Milan. In Milan, they held a press conference, which was attended by only one journalist, Michele Straniero. He interviewed Lee and Hinckley for an hour and not only published work in La Stampa from the interview but also used it as the starting point to a book on Mormonism that he later wrote.

Also in the 1970s, Hinckley had supervisory assignments for the church in South America and later in Europe. He served on the church's executive committees for temples, missionary work, welfare services, priesthood, and the military.

Hinckley was the chair of the executive committee over the 1980 commemoration of the 150th anniversary of the organization of the LDS Church.

=== Member of First Presidency ===
On July 23, 1981, Spencer W. Kimball appointed Hinckley as a counselor in the First Presidency. After first counselor N. Eldon Tanner died in 1982, Kimball did not appoint a new counselor. As the 1980s progressed, more of the day-to-day affairs of the First Presidency fell to the healthier Hinckley. By 1984, Hinckley was the only publicly-active member of the First Presidency.

In 1984, the church formed Area Presidencies. Until then, church headquarters administered national and multinational areas. The Area Presidencies decentralized administration with presidencies living in locations around the world.

During his time in Kimball's presidency, Hinckley presided over the dedication of 16 LDS temples. Among them was the Manila Philippines Temple. Hinckley dedicated it 18 years after he had dedicated the first Philippine LDS chapel. At the time of Kimball's death, Hinckley had dedicated nearly half of the then 36 temples.

After Kimball's death in November 1985, Ezra Taft Benson became President of the Church. Benson named Hinckley as first counselor and Thomas S. Monson as second counselor. In the early 1990s, Benson developed serious health problems, which removed him from public view. Hinckley and Monson carried out many of the duties of the First Presidency until Benson died in 1994.

During the presidencies of Kimball and Benson, most of the new temples dedicated were dedicated by Hinckley. When Benson died in 1994, about half of all operating temples had been dedicated by Hinckley.

Meanwhile, the Mark Hofmann document forgeries, bombings, and investigation occurred. "The news interest was global" and "the whole episode achieved epic proportions." Several books describe the acquisition of supposed historical documents by Hinckley and others such as the secret sale of the Stowell document describing Joseph Smith's "money-digging pursuits". Using $15,000 of church funds, Hinckley bought the document from Hofmann. Two years later, Hofmann leaked its existence to the Mormon history community. Upon press inquiries, Hinckley acknowledged the document and released it. Later, bombing investigators proved that Hofmann had forged the document.

In 1992, Hinckley made an official visit to Rome and he presented a copy of the Encyclopedia of Mormonism to the Vatican.

After Benson's death, Howard W. Hunter became president and retained Hinckley and Monson as counselors in the First Presidency. With Hunter as President of the Church, the title of President of the Quorum of the Twelve Apostles fell to Hinckley because he was the second-most senior Apostle after Hunter.

=== President of the Church ===
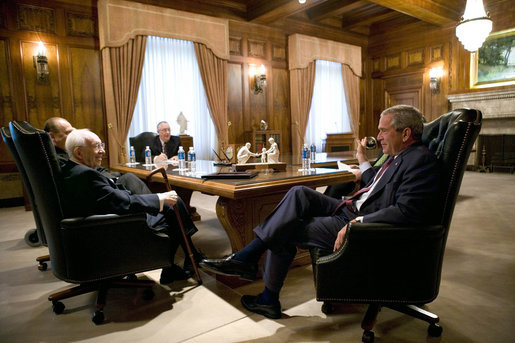
Hinckley and his counselors meet with George W. Bush, August 31, 2006, in the Church Administration Building in Salt Lake City, Utah.

When Hunter died after a presidency of nine months, Hinckley succeeded to the presidency of the church at the age of 84 on March 12, 1995. Hinckley immediately showed a change in approach and tone from his predecessors by making the meeting with the press. There, his call was announced at an actual press conference, and reporters were invited to ask questions, which sent the reporters scrambling to figure out what they would actually ask. On November 2, 2006, Hinckley surpassed David O. McKay to become the oldest LDS Church president in history.

Hinckley was known for accelerating the building of temples. When he became president, there were 47 operating temples in the church. At the time of his death, there were 124, over two thirds of which had been dedicated or rededicated under Hinckley, with 14 others announced or under construction. Hinckley oversaw other significant building projects, including the construction of the Conference Center and extensive renovations of the Salt Lake Tabernacle.

On September 23, 1995, Hinckley released "The Family: A Proclamation to the World," a statement of belief and counsel regarding the sanctity of the family and marriage; it was prepared by the First Presidency and Quorum of the Twelve. In February 1996, there were more church members outside than inside the United States. Also in 1996, 60 Minutes aired an interview of Hinckley by Mike Wallace during a segment on the LDS Church. In 1998, Hinckley was a guest on CNN's Larry King Live. Until his death, Hinckley maintained a friendship with both Wallace and Larry King.

In November 2000, Hinckley spoke to the youth of the church and gave them six traits to work on, named the "Six Be's" (Be Grateful, Be Smart, Be Clean, Be True, Be Humble, Be Prayerful), which were first introduced in his New York Times Bestseller Standing for Something and later expanded on in Way to Be.

On March 31, 2001, Hinckley announced the creation of the Perpetual Education Fund, an endowment that provides loans to students in developing nations. On October 22, 2002, Hinckley participated in the dedication of the Gordon B. Hinckley Building at Brigham Young University–Idaho in Rexburg, Idaho. That was the first building at BYU–Idaho to be named for a living church president.

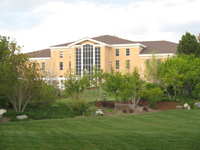
Gordon B. Hinckley Building at BYU-Idaho

In April 2003, Hinckley gave a sermon that addressed the ongoing War in Afghanistan and the Iraq War, which had started just two weeks earlier. He said that "as citizens we are all under the direction of our respective national leaders. They have access to greater political and military intelligence than do the people generally. He added, "Furthermore, we are a freedom-loving people, committed to the defense of liberty wherever it is in jeopardy." He also noted, "It may even be that [the Lord] will hold us responsible if we try to impede or hedge up the way of those who are involved in a contest with forces of evil and repression."

In March 2005, Hinckley, together with Thomas S. Monson and James E. Faust, celebrated their tenth anniversary as the First Presidency, the second time in the history of the church that a First Presidency had continued for such a period of time without personnel changes (the first time occurring between October 1934 and May 1945, when J. Reuben Clark and David O. McKay served as counselors to Heber J. Grant).

On January 24, 2006, Hinckley underwent surgery to remove cancerous growths from his large intestine. He was also then diagnosed with diabetes. In June 2006, Hinckley traveled to Iowa City, Iowa, to speak at a commemoration of the 150th anniversary of the start of the Mormon handcart companies. On June 23, 2006, his 96th birthday, Hinckley participated in a groundbreaking ceremony at Brigham Young University (BYU) in Provo, Utah, for a new building that was to be named in his honor. The building was named the Gordon B. Hinckley Alumni and Visitors Center and was completed and dedicated on Hinckley's 97th birthday.

On March 31, 2007, Hinckley rededicated the Salt Lake Tabernacle after extensive renovation. One of Hinckley's last public appearances was on January 4, 2008, when he offered the prayer at the rededication of the Utah State Capitol. His final public appearance was a week before his death, the dedication of the Garden Park Ward building on January 20, 2008.

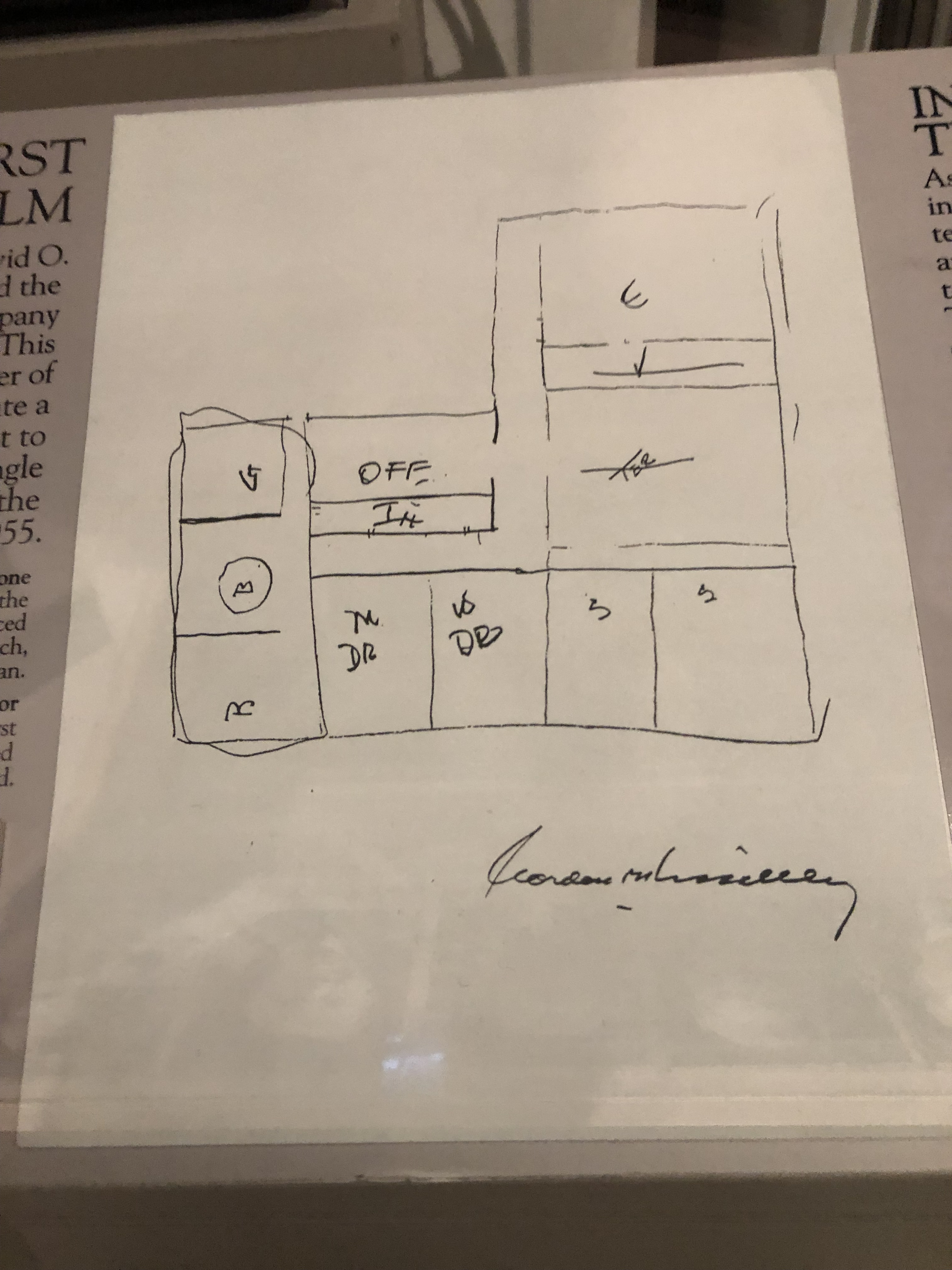
Sketch made by Hinckley while on a trip to Mexico, detailing the floor plan of how a smaller temple would look. Housed at the Church History Museum

During his tenure as president, Hinckley gave over 2,000 speeches. He traveled nearly a million miles over a lifetime to more than 160 countries, as he met with church members and dedicated meetinghouses and temples.

Hinckley's annual speeches at BYU were the subject of a study by the National Center for Voice and Speech at the University of Utah to analyze how the human voice changes with age. The 36 speeches by Hinckley that were analyzed ranged from 1958, when he was 47–48, to 2007, the year prior to his death. The study showed how his voice started dropping in pitch in his 50s and continued until he was 70, when he began to develop a higher, thinner "old person" voice. By his 80s, his voice became increasingly wavery and the rate of his speech began to slow, and by his 90s, he would slur words. Hinckley was a good subject for the study, as the annual addresses were meticulously recorded and transcribed; in addition, he did not smoke, drink, sing, or engage in other activities that would put unnatural strain on his voice.

=== Temple dedications ===
When Hinckley became president, he had dedicated 23 of the church's 47 temples and had rededicated four of the remaining 24. As president, Hinckley presided at the dedication of 65 additional temples. Hinckley also rededicated five temples while president of the church, four of which he had dedicated initially. In all, Hinckley dedicated or rededicated 92 different temples, 70 of which as president of the church, at 97 different dedicatory services.

== Awards ==
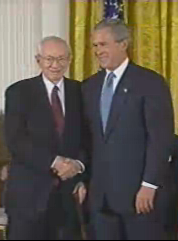
Hinckley receiving the Presidential Medal of Freedom from U.S. President George W. Bush in 2004

On June 23, 2004 (Hinckley's 94th birthday), U.S. President George W. Bush awarded Hinckley the Presidential Medal of Freedom in a ceremony at the White House. The press release put forth by the White House stated: "Gordon B. Hinckley ... has inspired millions and has led efforts to improve humanitarian aid, disaster relief, and education funding across the globe."

Hinckley received many educational honors, including the Distinguished Citizen Award from Southern Utah University, Distinguished Alumni Award from the University of Utah, and 10 honorary doctorates from schools including Westminster College, Utah State University, Utah Valley University, University of Utah, Brigham Young University, Brigham Young University–Idaho, Weber State University, and Southern Utah University. He received the Silver Buffalo Award, which is the highest honor bestowed by the Boy Scouts of America, and was honored by the National Conference for Community and Justice for his contributions to tolerance and understanding in the world. In 1996, Hinckley received the Golden Plate Award of the American Academy of Achievement presented by Awards Council member and philanthropist Jon Huntsman Sr.

== Death and legacy ==
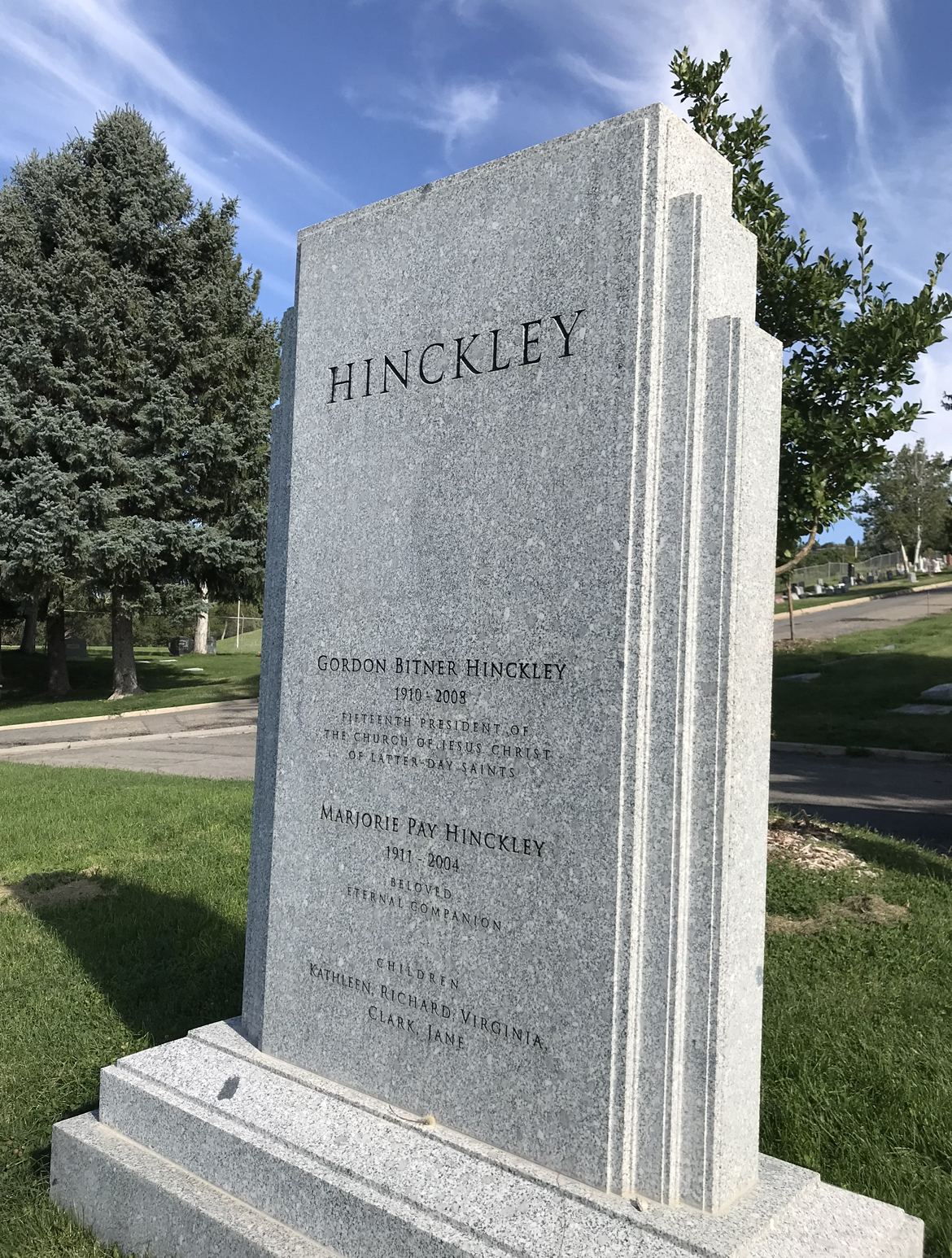
Hinckley's grave at Salt Lake City Cemetery

On January 27, 2008, Hinckley died at the age of 97 while surrounded by family in his Salt Lake City apartment. According to a church spokesman, the death was due to "causes incident to age". The Deseret Morning News reported that Hinckley had just gone through a treatment of chemotherapy a few days earlier, and had "worked until the very end." The day following Hinckley's death, thousands of LDS youth in six states organized a social network campaign to dress in "Sunday Best" to honor Hinckley. Funeral services were held on February 2, 2008, at the Conference Center in Salt Lake City, which was attended by tens of thousands. Hinckley was buried at the Salt Lake City Cemetery next to his wife, who had died almost four years earlier. Some of the soil that was used to bury him was imported from the grounds of the Preston England Temple in Lancashire; this was done because Hinckley had been a missionary in this region of England. Hinckley was succeeded as president by Thomas S. Monson on February 3, 2008.

In 2012, a 50-year longitudinal study of the development of Hinckley's voice, based on addresses he gave at BYU, was published in the Journal of the American Geriatrics Society. The study gave insight into the changes in the voices of aging adults.

Hinckley's teachings as an apostle were the 2017 course of study in the LDS Church's Sunday Relief Society and Melchizedek priesthood classes.

=== In popular culture ===
Hinckley was portrayed by John Schmedes in season 1 episode 2 of A Friend of the Family.

== Publications ==
- Hinckley, Gordon B. (2016). Teachings of Presidents of the Church: Gordon B. Hinckley. LDS Church. LDS Church publication number 08862.
- —— (2008). My Dear Sisters: Inspiration for Women from Gordon B. Hinckley. Covenant Communications. ISBN 978-1-59811-595-6.
- —— (2006). One Bright Shining Hope: Messages for Women from Gordon B. Hinckley. Deseret Book. ISBN 1-59038-355-9.
- —— (2005). Discourses of President Gordon B. Hinckley (2 vols. ed.). Deseret Book., ISBN 1-59038-431-8 (vol. 1), ISBN 1-59038-518-7 (vol. 2)
- —— (2002). Way to Be!: Nine Ways to Be Happy and Make Something of Your Life. Simon & Schuster. ISBN 0-7432-3830-3.
- —— (2001). Truth Restored: A Short History of the Church of Jesus Christ of Latter-day Saints (Revised ed.). LDS Church. ISBN 9780307559968. OCLC 49300018.. Reprint in part of What of the Mormons?
- —— (2001). Walking in the Light of the Lord: A Message for Mothers. Eagle Gate. ISBN 978-1-57345-979-2.
- —— (2001). Stand a Little Taller. Eagle Gate. ISBN 1-57008-767-9.
- —— (2000). Standing for Something: Ten Neglected Virtues That Will Heal Our Hearts and Homes. Times Books. ISBN 0-8129-3317-6.
- —— (1997). Teachings of Gordon B. Hinckley. Deseret Book. ISBN 1-57345-262-9.
- —— (1989). Faith: The Essence of True Religion. Deseret Book. ISBN 0-87579-270-7.
- —— (1981). Be Thou An Example. Deseret Book. ISBN 0-87747-899-6.
- —— (1973). From My Generation to Yours, With Love. Deseret Book. ISBN 0-87747-512-1.
- —— (1951). James Henry Moyle, the story of a Distinguished American and an honored churchman. Deseret Book. OCLC 13963049.
- —— (1947). What of the Mormons? A Brief Study of the Church of Jesus Christ of Latter-day Saints. LDS Church. OCLC 7241540.
- —— (1943). A Brief Statement of Principles of the Gospel Based Largely Upon the Compendium (Richards/Little) with Excerpts from Other Writings: Including Also Church Chronology, Priesthood Ordinances, Selected Hymns. LDS Church. ISBN 9780307559968. OCLC 13965791.

== See also ==
- Alonzo A. Hinckley, uncle who was also an LDS apostle
- May Green Hinckley, stepmother

== Notes ==
The Church of Jesus Christ of Latter-day Saints titles
| Preceded by Howard W. Hunter | President of the Church; March 12, 1995 – January 27, 2008 | Succeeded by Thomas S. Monson |
| Preceded by Howard W. Hunter | President of the Quorum of the Twelve Apostles; June 5, 1994 – March 12, 1995 | Succeeded by Thomas S. Monson |
| Preceded by Marion G. Romney | First Counselor in the First Presidency; June 5, 1994 – March 3, 1995; November 10, 1985 – May 30, 1994 | Succeeded by Thomas S. Monson |
| Preceded by Marion G. Romney | Second Counselor in the First Presidency; December 2, 1982 – November 5, 1985 | Succeeded by Thomas S. Monson |
| | Counselor in the First Presidency; July 23, 1981 –December 2, 1982 | |
| Preceded by Howard W. Hunter | Quorum of the Twelve Apostles; September 30, 1961 – March 12, 1995 | Succeeded by N. Eldon Tanner |
