= Lorenzo Snow Young =

American architect (1894–1968)

Lorenzo Snow Young (November 16, 1894 – March 26, 1968), nicknamed "Bing", was a 20th-century architect in Utah. Young practiced for 40 years in Salt Lake City, Utah and is credited with having designed over 700 buildings.

Young's architectural training came at the Pratt Institute in New York City and at the University of Pennsylvania under Paul Philippe Cret between 1922-1924. He returned to Utah in 1924 and went to work briefly for the church architect of the Church of Jesus Christ of Latter-day Saints (LDS Church). In 1929 he established an architectural firm with Edward O. Anderson that lasted through 1936. Two of his early works are some of his most notable, namely the Kingsbury Hall in the University of Utah Circle and the Granite Stake Tabernacle, which are both listed on the U.S. National Register of Historic Places. Young later partnered with Arnold Ehlers. In the late 1930s and early 1940s, Young was on the church board of architects for the LDS Church, which oversaw the design of the Idaho Falls Idaho Temple. Young served as president of the Utah Chapter of the American Institute of Architects (AIA) during the 1930s.

== Daughters of the Utah Pioneers Memorial Museum ==
In preparations for the centennial celebration of the Mormon pioneers entering the Salt Lake Valley in 1847, Young was commissioned by the Daughters of the Utah Pioneers (DUP) to build the Pioneer Memorial Museum near the State Capitol in Salt Lake City. The DUP had vigorously opposed the demolition of the Salt Lake Theatre 20 years previously and Young thought that designing the museum after the old theater designed by William H. Folsom would be fitting. Many of his colleagues at the AIA disagreed, preferring a contemporary design. Young went forward with his plans but ultimately resigned his membership in the AIA as a result of the disagreement.

== Late career ==
In one of his final projects, Young was also involved in the early phases of designing the Marriott Center at Brigham Young University with Bob Fowler. Young had begun the process of becoming firm partners with Fowler when he unexpectedly died in March 1968 due to complications following back surgery.

== Personal life ==
Young was the youngest son of Brigham Morris Young and Celestia Armeda Snow. Young was the grandchild of two LDS Church presidents, Brigham Young and Lorenzo Snow. His uncle Don Carlos Young, and cousins George Cannon Young and Don Carlos Young, Jr. were other architects of note in Utah. Prior to architectural training, Young served in World War I, during which his hand was wounded. Between 1941-1960, Young was a member of the Mormon Tabernacle Choir.

== Images of works ==
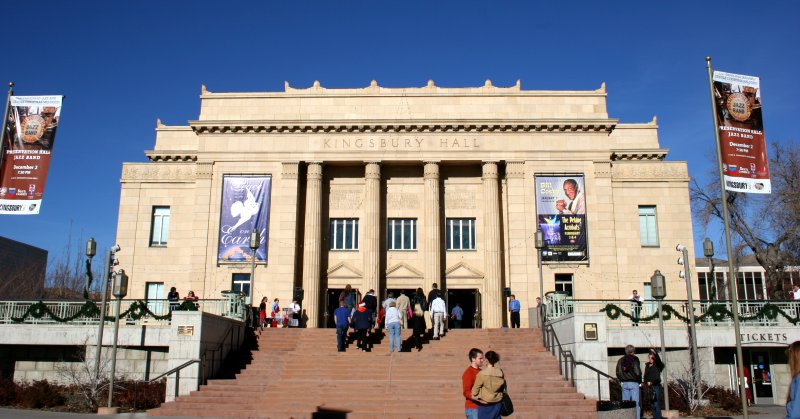
Kingsbury Hall (1928)*NRHP listed in University of Utah Circle

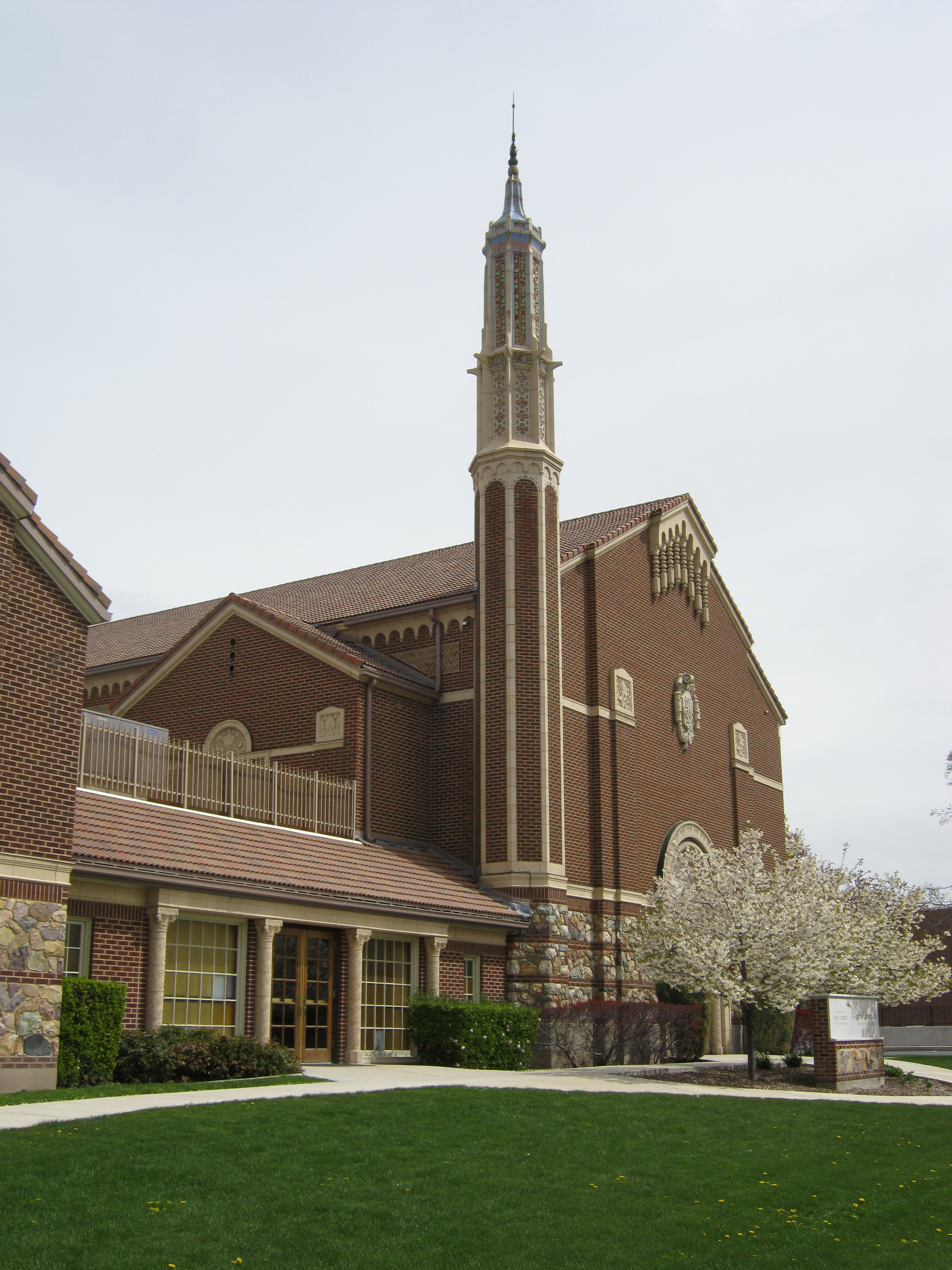
Granite Stake Tabernacle (1930)*NRHP listed

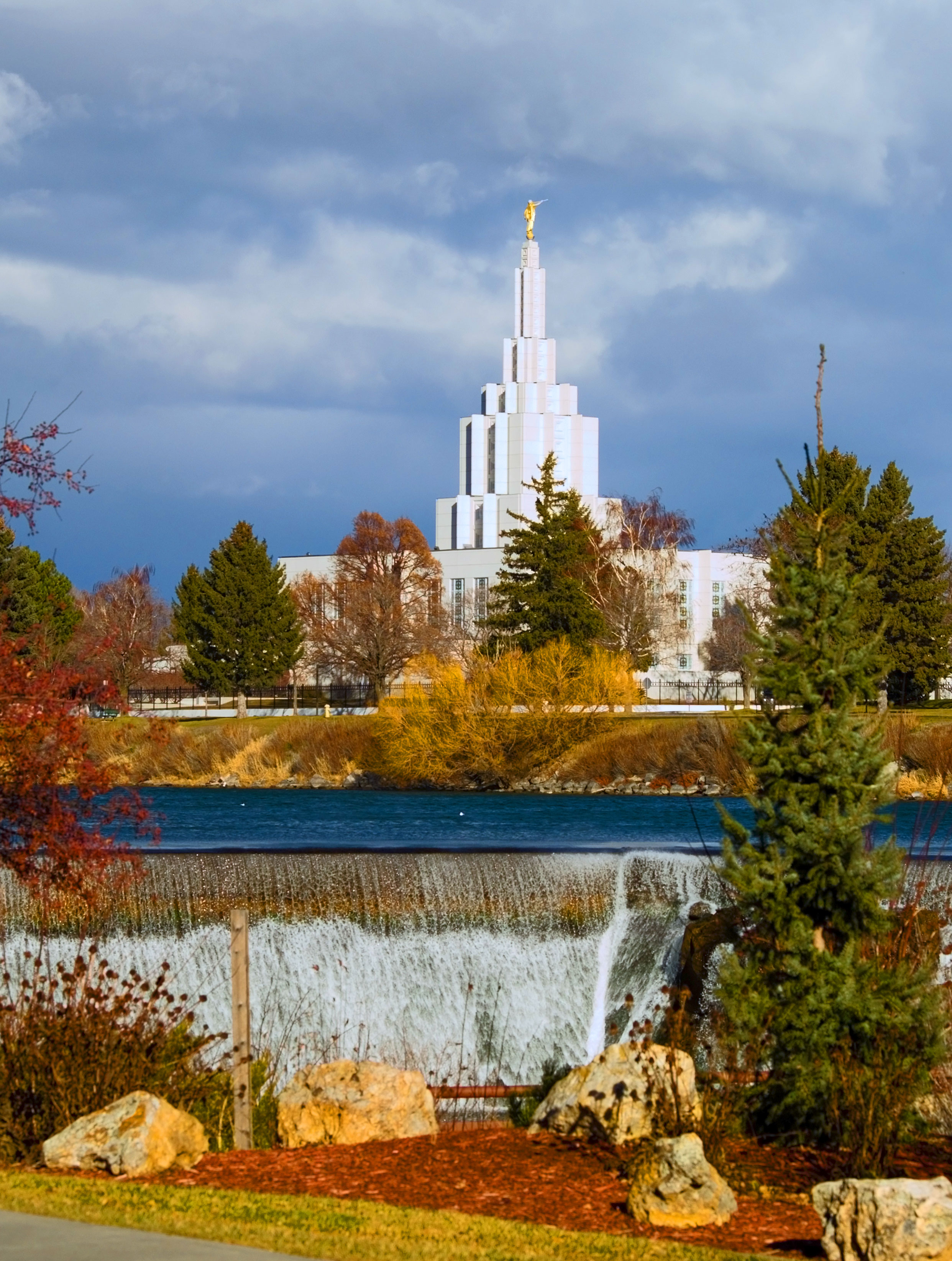
Idaho Falls Idaho Temple (1945)

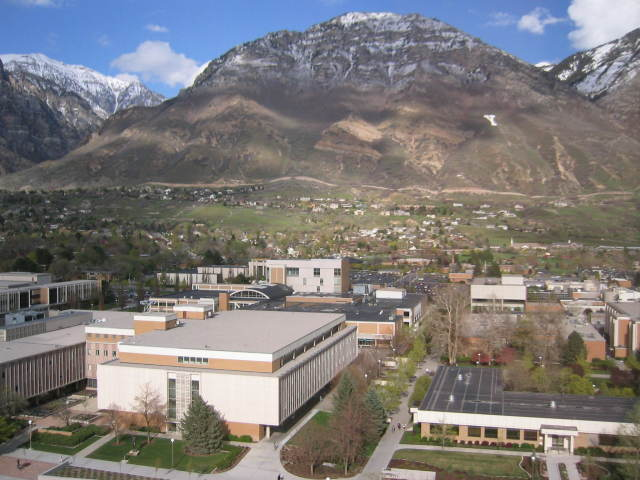
Harold B. Lee Library (1961)

== Other selected works ==
- Sugar House Monument (1930) *NRHP listed
- Fairview North Ward
- Vernal First Ward Chapel (1934-1977)
- Minidoka Stake Tabernacle (1937), 806 G street, Rupert, Idaho
- Pioneer Memorial Museum (Daughters of the Utah Pioneers) (1947)
- Uintah County Hospital (1950)
- Bonneville Ward Meetinghouse (1952)
- Milwaukee Meetinghouse, 4422 West Leon Terrace, Milwaukee, WI
- Lorenzo Snow Young Residence, 1608 Michigan Ave, Salt Lake City
