= Millard F. Malin =

American sculptor (1891–1974)

Millard F. Malin, Jr.
- Born: October 25, 1891; Salt Lake City, Utah
- Died: March 1975 (aged 83); Salt Lake City, Utah, U.S.
- Education: National Academy of Design; Beaux-Arts Institute of Design
- Known for: Sculpture
- Notable work: Sugar House Monument; Angel Moroni at several LDS temples
- Spouse: Rosalind Marshall (m. 1958; died 1971)

Millard Fillmore Malin Jr (October 25, 1891 – March 1975) was an American sculptor most noted for his statues of the Angel Moroni, such as the one on the Los Angeles Temple, and the Sugar House Monument. He sculpted in the realist style. He worked extensively with architect Edward O. Anderson, designing statuary for several other Latter-day Saints temples, such as the ones in Switzerland, England and New Zealand. He also sculpted busts of figures such as Henry H. Blood, former Governor of Utah.

== Biography ==
Malin was born on October 25, 1891 in Salt Lake City to Millard Fillmore Malin Sr (1851-1937) and Annie Pinnock Malin (1863-1935). He had three sisters. Malin's mother was born in London but raised in the United States, and was involved in the Church of Jesus Christ of Latter-day Saints by composing songs and poems for children. He traveled to New Zealand in 1909 and lived there for three years as a missionary.

When he returned to Utah, he studied medicine, specifically human anatomy, at the University of Utah. There, he befriended Edward O. Anderson and studied under as Edwin Evans, but left in 1915 after just one year so he could save money to study art in New York. In 1917, he started attending the National Academy of Design, where he studied under Hermon A. MacNeil. He also studied design at Beaux-Arts Institute of Design. During his schooling, he worked with MacNeil on the Statue of Ezra Cornell at Cornell University. In the 1920s, he worked as an assistant to Gutzon Borglum on the Confederate Memorial Carving at Stone Mountain in Georgia. After completing his education, Malin returned to Utah, where he established a studio with Edward Anderson. The two collaborated on the Sugar House Monument, which was completed in 1930, and he sculpted statues, including Angel Moroni, for several of the LDS temples designed by Anderson.

In 1934, he completed a bronze bust of Governor Henry H. Blood, now at Camp Williams. In 1934 and 1935, he worked on two marble busts of Ute Natives, Chief John Duncan (1849-1941) and Unca Sam (1832-1938), now housed at the Utah State Capitol, for the Federal Art Project. In 1953, he created a 15-foot tall Angel Moroni for the Los Angeles Temple. He then designed the oxen that hold up the baptismal font of the Bern Switzerland Temple and created additional sculptures for the temples in England and the New Zealand. In 1964, he sculpted three giant concrete dinosaurs, the largest reaching 17 feet tall, to be installed at the Utah Field House of Natural History.

Malin taught sculpture at the Utah Art Center in the 1930s and 1940s, and at Gonzaga University. Among those who studied under Malin were Maurice E. Brooks and Alice Morrey Bailey. He was also a founding member of the Modern Artists of Utah and had at least one poem published in the LDS Church's periodical Improvement Era. He also wrote three books about planetary systems: The Center of Gravity, Solar Arrangement, and Mystery of the Sun.

== Personal life and death ==
Malin married Rosalind Pidge Marshall (1913-1971) in Elko, Nevada in August 1958. She was a schoolteacher and sculptor. Malin died at his home in Salt Lake City in March 1975.

His childhood home, built by his father in 1889, was added to the National Register of Historic Places in July 1983.

== Gallery ==
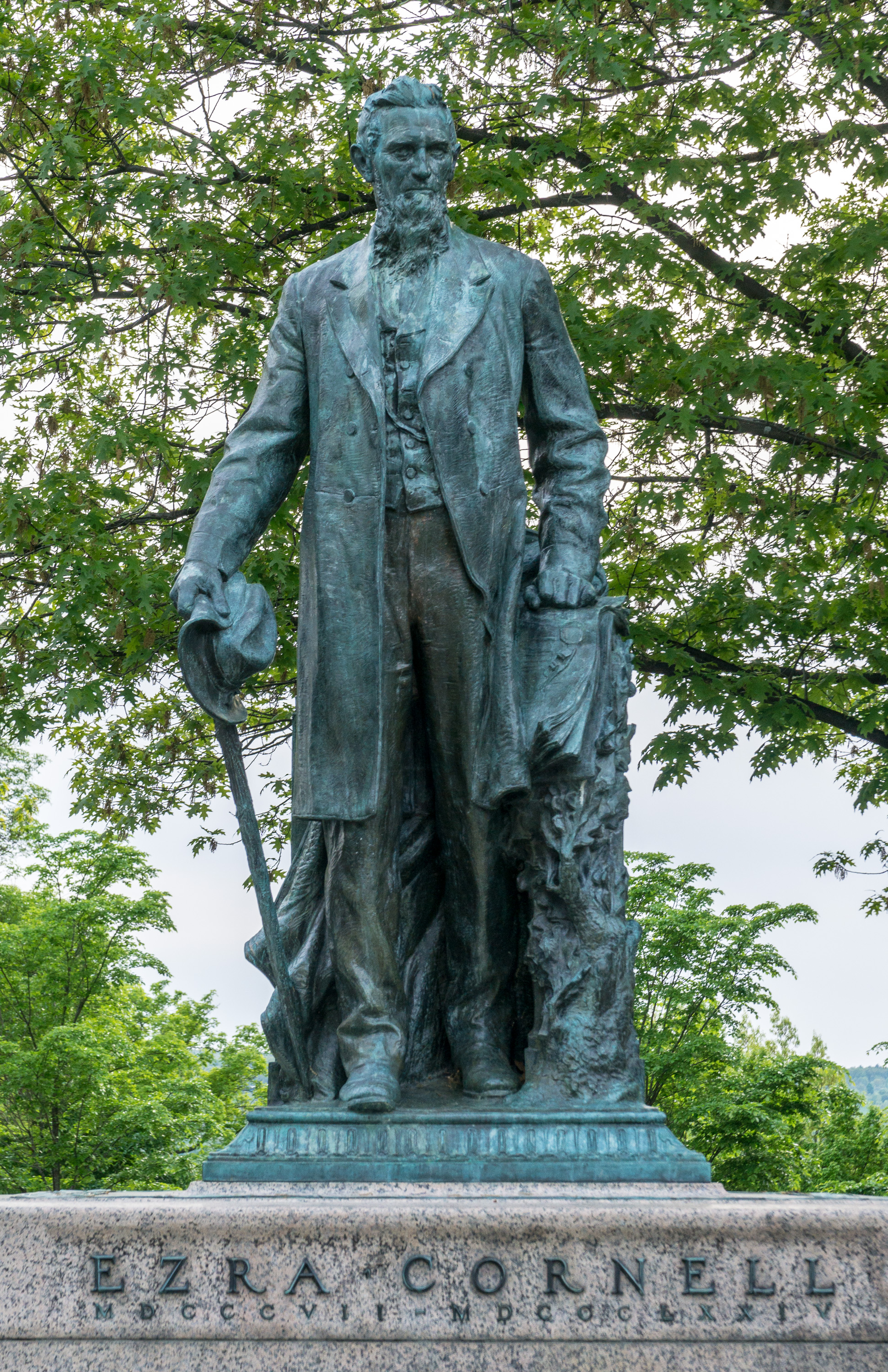
Statue of Ezra Cornell by MacNeil, who Malin assisted.

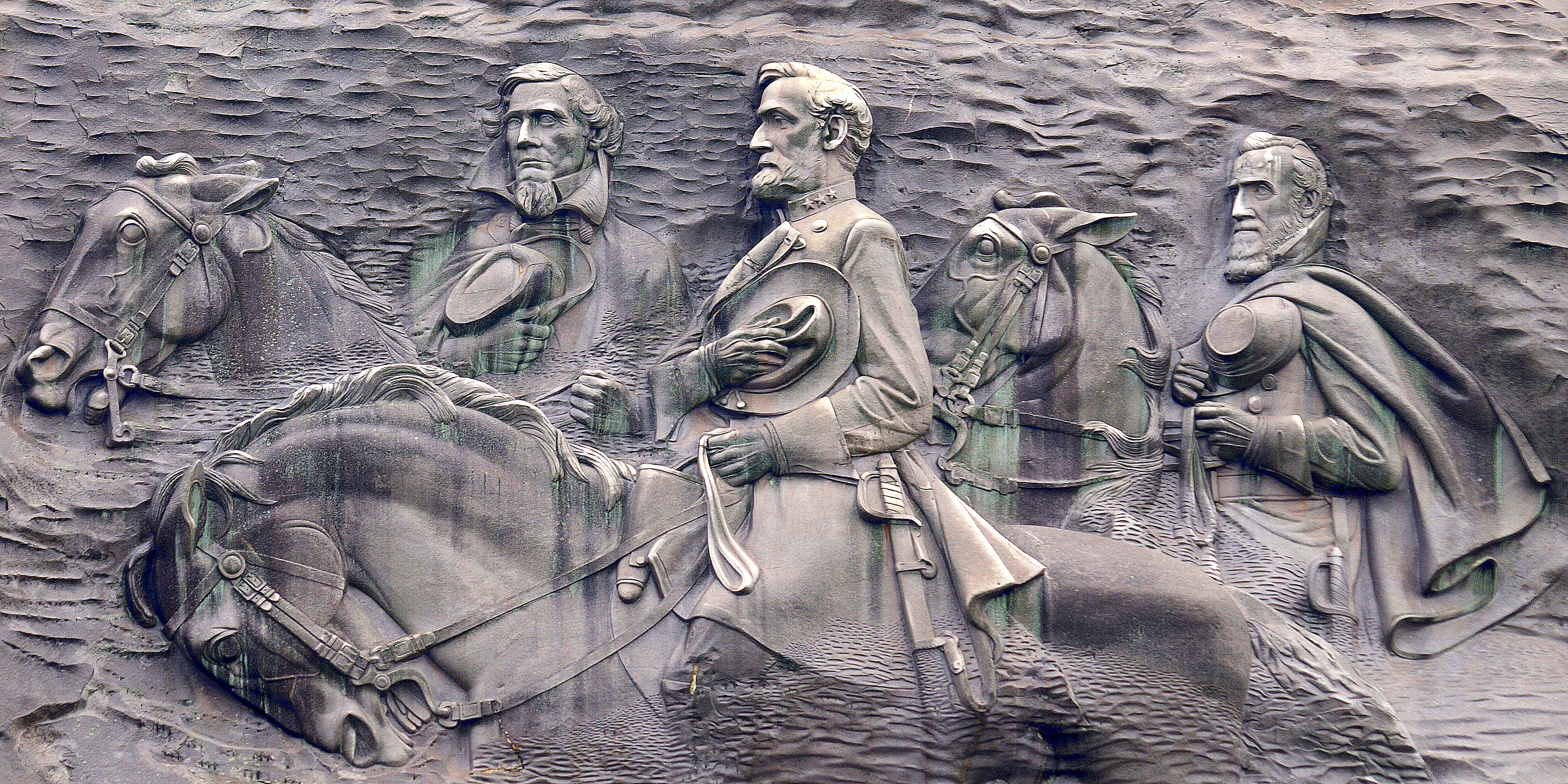
Stone Mountain carving by Borglum, who Malin assisted.

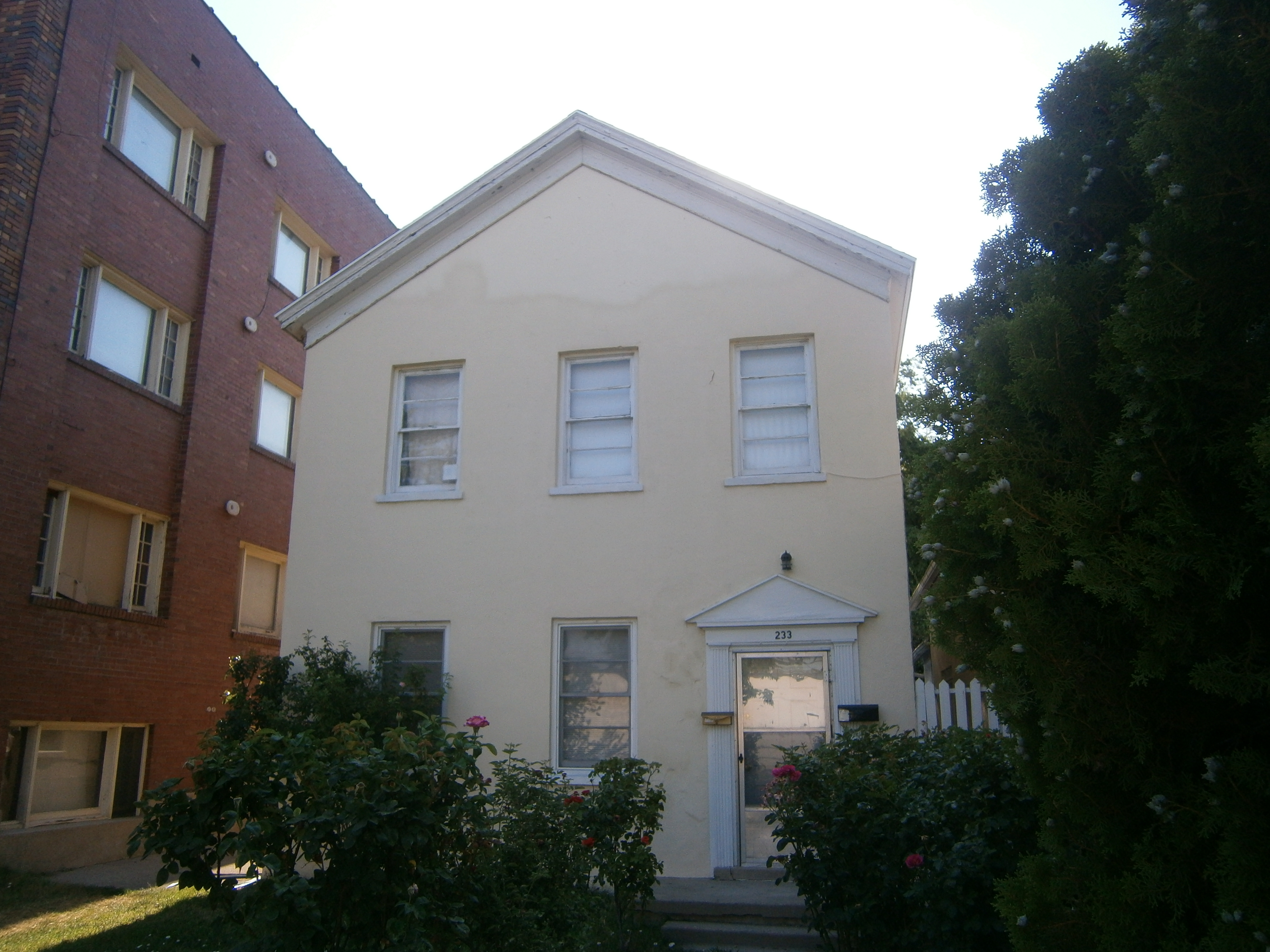
The Millard F. Malin House (2017), built by Millard Malin, Sr. in 1889.

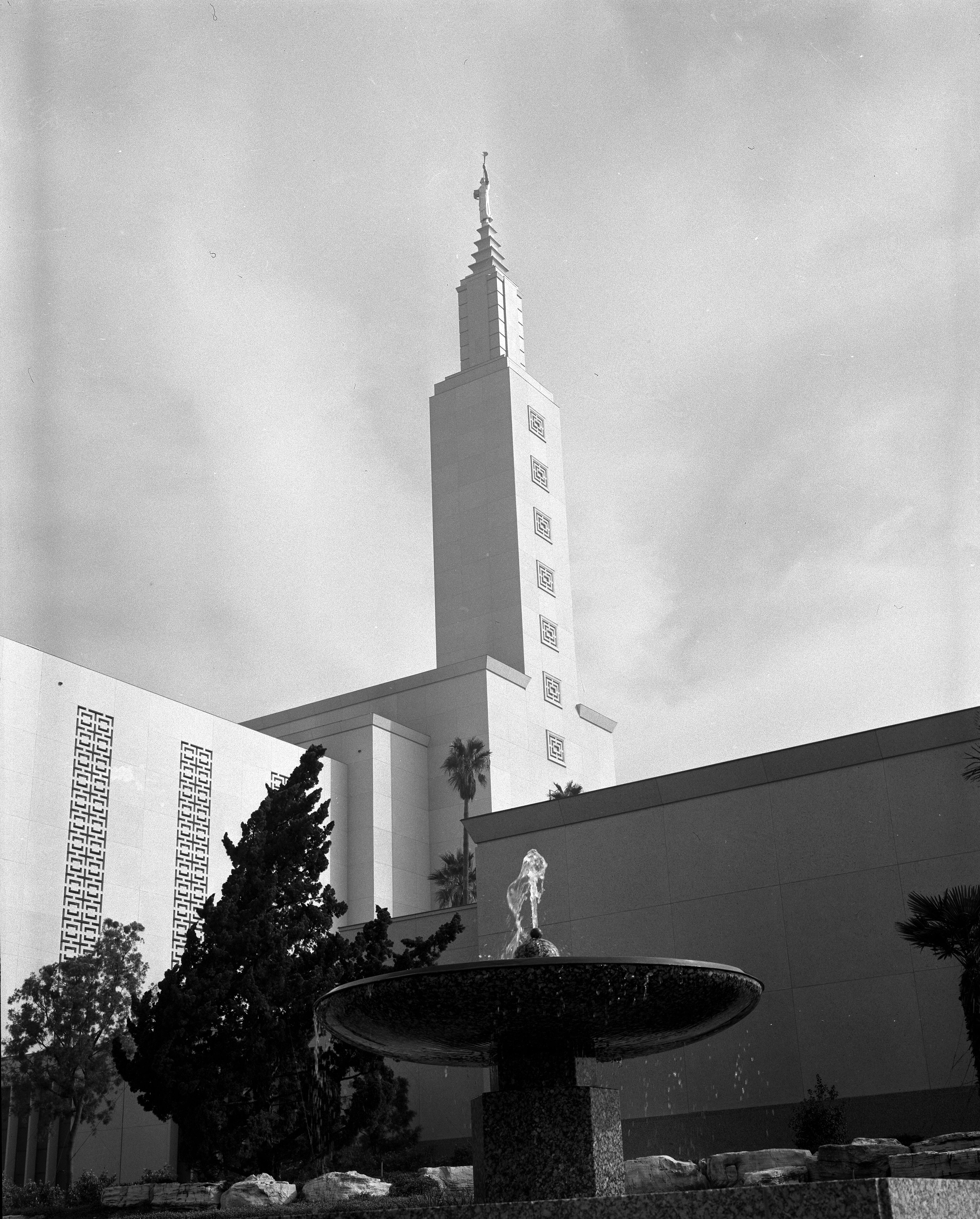
The Los Angeles Temple, with Malin's Angel Moroni visible at the top.

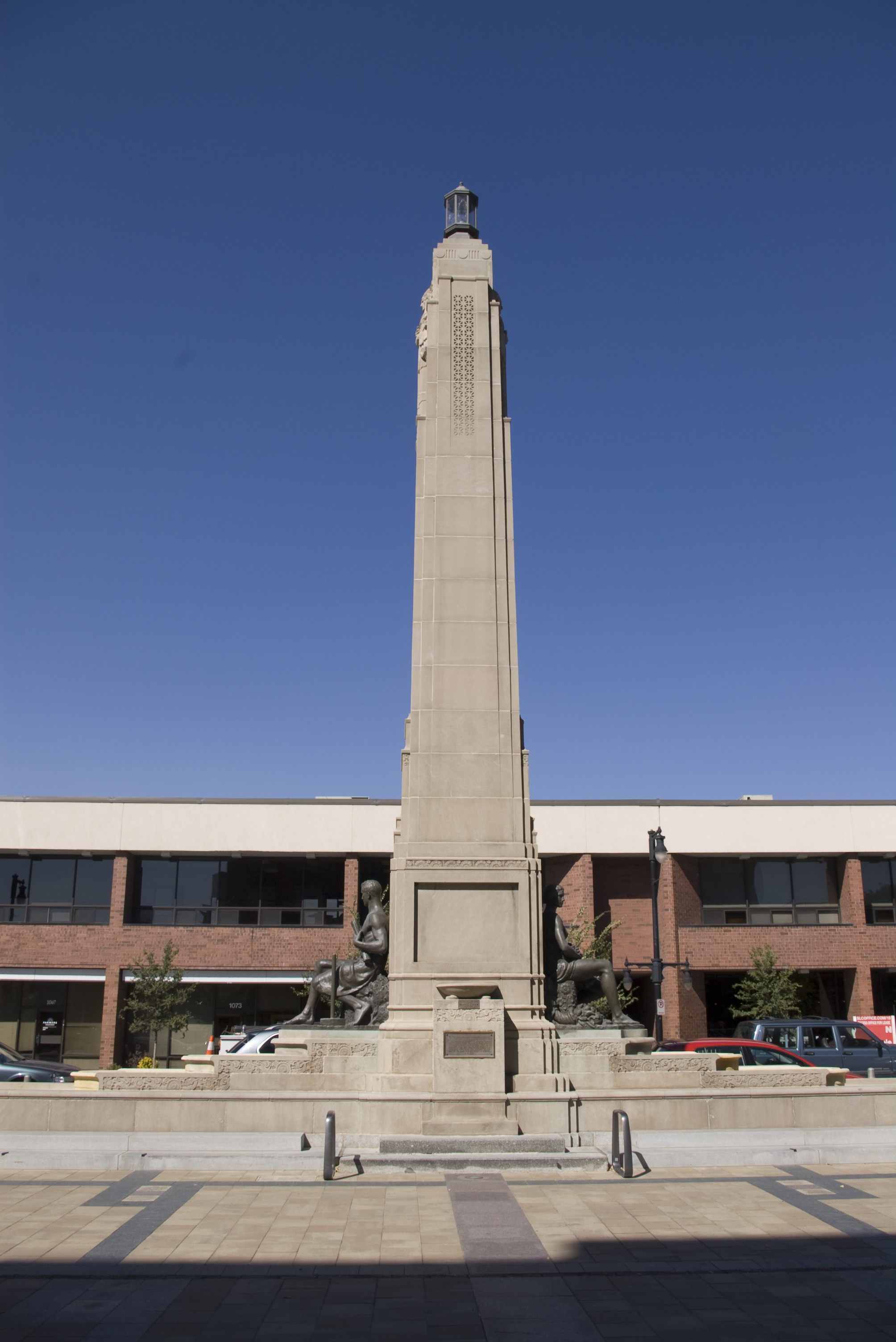
The Sugar House Monument, designed by Anderson and constructed by Malin.

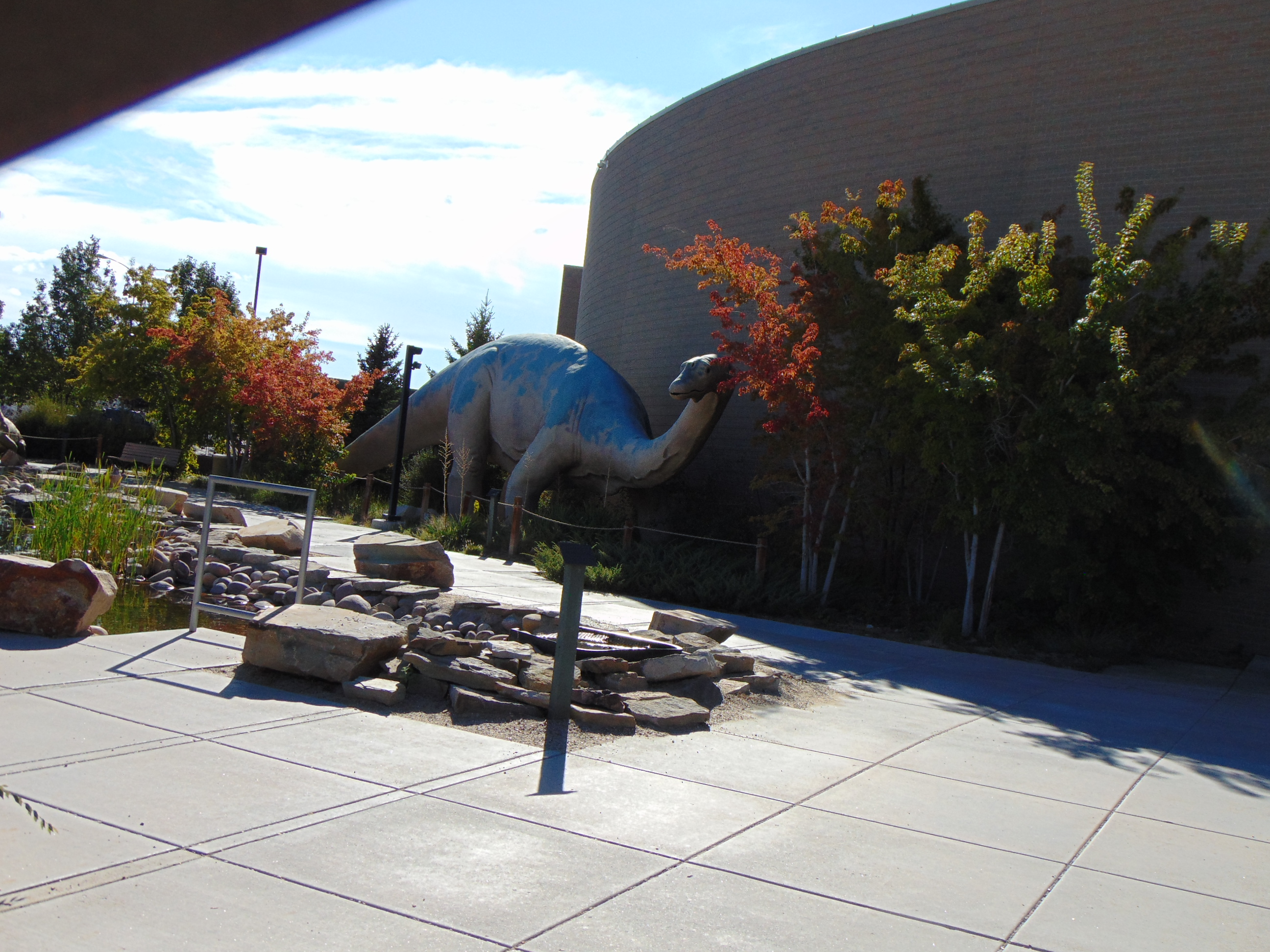
One of Malin's concrete dinosaurs at the Utah Field House of Natural History.
