= Maurice Brooks =

Maurice Brooks may refer to:

- Maurice Brooks (naturalist) (1900–1993), American educator and naturalist
- Maurice Brooks (politician) (c. 1823–1905), Irish politician and woman's suffragist
- Maurice E. Brooks (1908–1970), American sculptor and painter
