= Gilt Edge =

Gilt edge or Gilt Edge may refer to:

- Gilding, the decorative technique
- Gilt Edge, Tennessee
- Gilt Edge, Alberta
- Gilt Edge, Nevada, now Atwood
- Gilt-edged tanager
- Gilt-edged securities
