= The Church of Jesus Christ of Latter-day Saints in Switzerland =

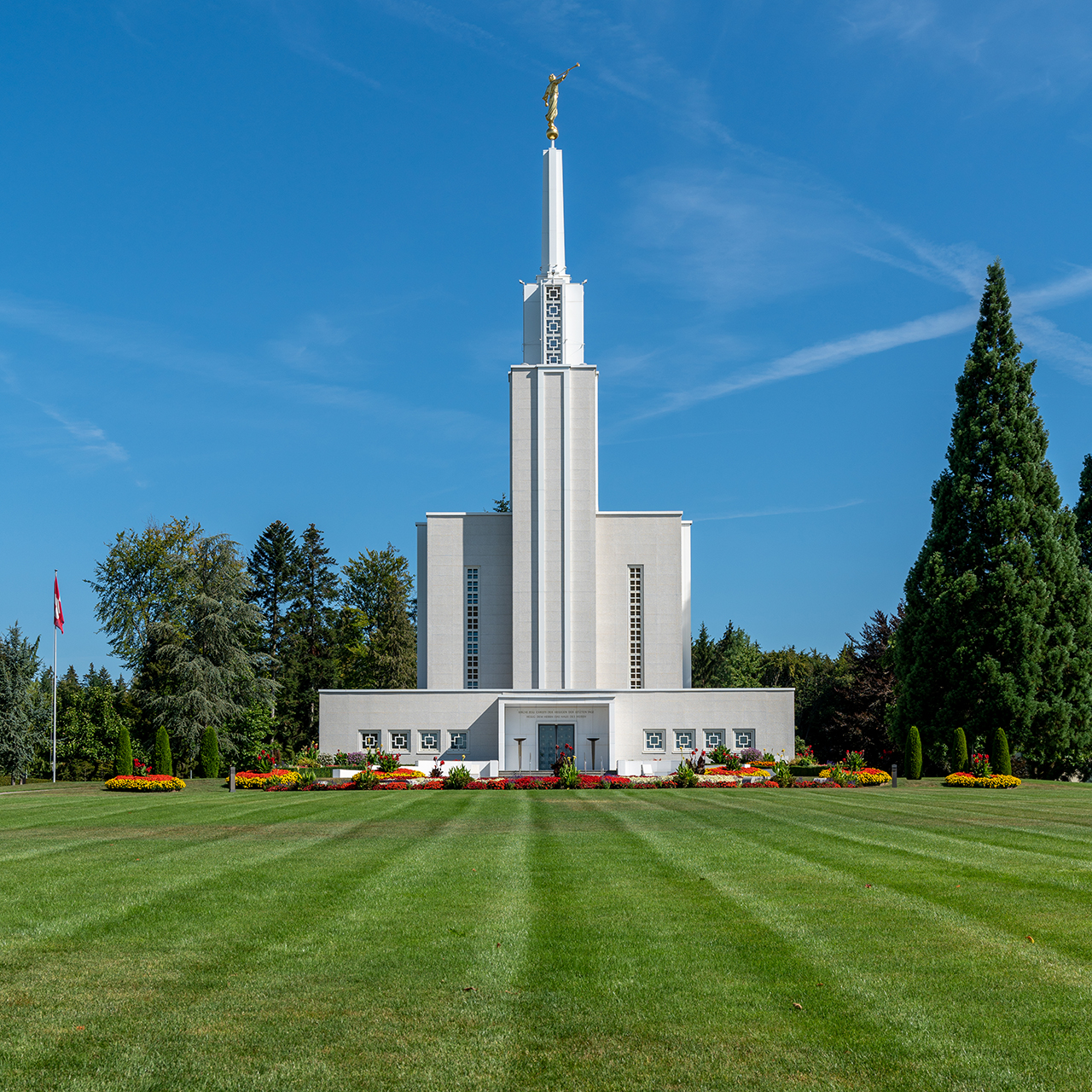
- The Bern Switzerland Temple
- Area: Europe Central
- Members: 9,630 (2025)
- Stakes: 5
- Wards: 26
- Branches: 8
- Total Congregations: 34
- Temples: 1 operating
- FamilySearch Centers: 13

The Church of Jesus Christ of Latter-day Saints in Switzerland has a rich history beginning in 1850. As of December 31, 2022, The Church of Jesus Christ of Latter-day Saints (LDS Church) reported 9,630 members in Switzerland, organized in five stakes and 34 congregations (26 wards and 8 branches).

== History ==
Membership in Switzerland
Year	Membership
1855*	100
1904*	1,000
1930	1,632
1940	1,348
1950	1,731
1960	3,235
1970	4,685
1979	5,390
1989*	6,200
1999	7,043
2009	7,939
2019	9,071
2025	9,630
*Membership was published as an estimate.

Missionary work for LDS Church began in Switzerland on November 24, 1850, when the Swiss Mission was created. The Swiss Mission later became the Swiss and Italian Mission and the Swiss, Italian, and German Mission. Many early converts were baptized, but then emigrated to the United States until the 1950s.

On September 11, 1955, the LDS Church completed its first temple in Europe when the Bern Switzerland Temple was completed in Münchenbuchsee. The temple was later remodeled and rededicated by Gordon B. Hinckley in October 1992. In 1994, Howard W. Hunter visited Switzerland as the new LDS Church president.

Hans B. Ringger was a Swiss national who was a leader of the LDS Church in Switzerland. Born on 2 November 1925, in Zurich, Switzerland, his grandmother, Elizabeth Zoebeli Ringger, joined the LDS Church in 1896 and his parents, Carl Ringger, Jr., and Maria Reif, were also active members. Ringger eventually became an LDS Church general authority. Stephen Nadauld and Douglas Bischoff served as missionaries for the church in Switzerland, with Nadauld later serving as president of the Switzerland Geneva Mission from 2003 to 2006.

As of 2020, members total approximately 8,000, with many coming from second, third, and fourth generations of members in Switzerland. Forty congregations meet in 27 meetinghouses.

== Stakes ==
Stake Centers and Temple in Switzerland
Red=Operating Temple
Green = Stake Center

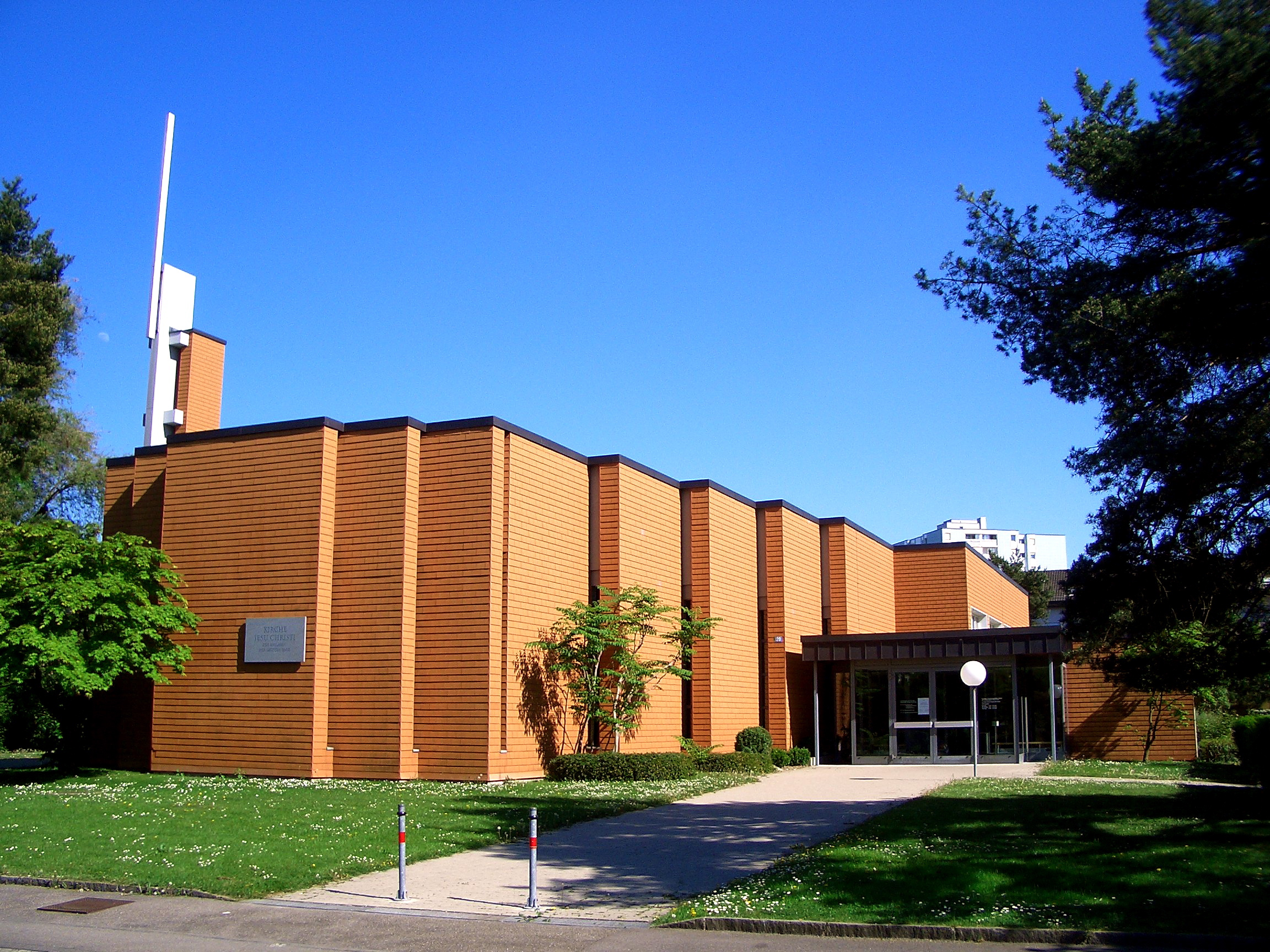
The Zurich meetinghouse and Stake Center

As of August 2026, the Switzerland had the following stakes and congregations:

Stake	Organized	Mission
Bern Switzerland Stake	3 May 1981	Alpine German-Speaking
Geneva Switzerland Stake	20 June 1982	France Lyon
Lausanne Switzerland Stake	28 Aug 2005	France Lyon
Milan Italy West (Note: Stake located outside of Switzerland with congregation(s) meeting in Switzerland)	7 June 1981	Italy Milan
St Gallen Switzerland Stake	5 May 2007	Alpine German-Speaking
Zürich Switzerland Stake	28 Oct 1961	Alpine German-Speaking

== Missions ==
- Alpine German-speaking Mission
- France Lyon Mission
- Italy Milan Mission

== Temples ==
9. Bern Switzerland Temple; Official website; News & images	
Location: Announced: Groundbreaking: Dedicated: Rededicated: Size: Style: Notes:	Münchenbuchsee, Switzerland; 1 July 1952 by David O. McKay; 5 August 1953 by David O. McKay; 11 September 1955 by David O. McKay; 23 November 1992 by Gordon B. Hinckley; 35,546 sq ft (3,302.3 m^{2}) on a 7-acre (2.8 ha) site Modern, single spire - designed by Edward O. Anderson; Bern was the first temple to present the endowment using a movie, necessitated by the multiple languages required to support the members in Europe.

== See also ==
- Religion in Switzerland
