= Maurice E. Brooks =

American sculptor and painter

- Born: 1908; Edgewood, Nevada, U.S.
- Died: December 1, 1970 (aged 61–62); Salt Lake City, Utah, U.S.
- Education: University of Utah
- Occupations: Sculptor, painter

Maurice E. Brooks (1908 - December 1, 1970) was an American sculptor and painter.

== Life ==
Brooks was born in 1908 in Edgewood, Nevada. He graduated from the University of Utah.

Brooks was articled to sculptor Millard F. Malin, whom he assisted in designing the Mormon Battalion on the Utah State Capitol and the Sugar House Monument in Salt Lake City. Brooks designed busts as well as baptismal fonts for the Church of Jesus Christ of Latter-day Saints in Bern, London, and New Zealand. He was also a painter, and like many artists he painted scenes in Dixie, southwestern Utah. One of his paintings depicting Native Americans dancing was acquired by the Springville Museum of Art.

Brooks died on December 1, 1970, in Salt Lake City, and his funeral was held at the Cathedral of the Madeleine.
