= Kingsbury Hall =

Performing arts center in Salt Lake City, Utah, U.S.

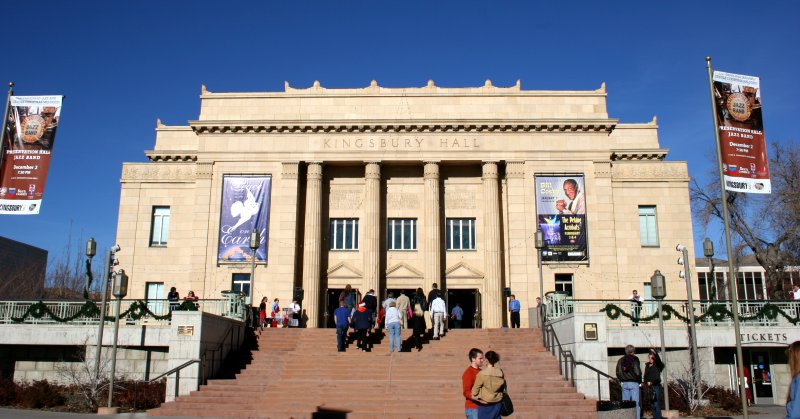
- Interactive map of Kingsbury Hall
- Location: 1395 E. Presidents Circle; Salt Lake City, Utah; United States
- Coordinates: 40°45′59″N 111°51′03″W
- Owner: University of Utah
- Seating type: Reserved
- Capacity: 1,992
- Type: Performing arts center

Construction
- Opened: 1930

Website
- www.kingsburyhall.org

Kingsbury Hall is a center for the performing arts located on the University of Utah campus in Salt Lake City, Utah.

== History ==
Kingsbury Hall was designed by Edward O. Anderson and Lorenzo Snow Young and built in 1930. It was named after Joseph T. Kingsbury, former president of the University. Many of Utah's performing arts organizations started in Kingsbury Hall, including Ballet West and Utah Opera. Along with eight buildings along University Circle, Kingsbury Hall is part of the University of Utah Circle historic district, which was listed on the National Register of Historic Places in 1978.

The building was renovated in 1997 thanks to a $1.7 million donation from Bruce Bastian.

On October 7, 2020, Kingsbury Hall was the site of the vice presidential debate between then Vice President Mike Pence and Democratic nominee and California Senator Kamala Harris, which is infamous for a fly landing on Pence's head.
