= Granite Stake Tabernacle =

Historic building in Salt Lake City, Utah, U.S.

- U.S. National Register of Historic Places
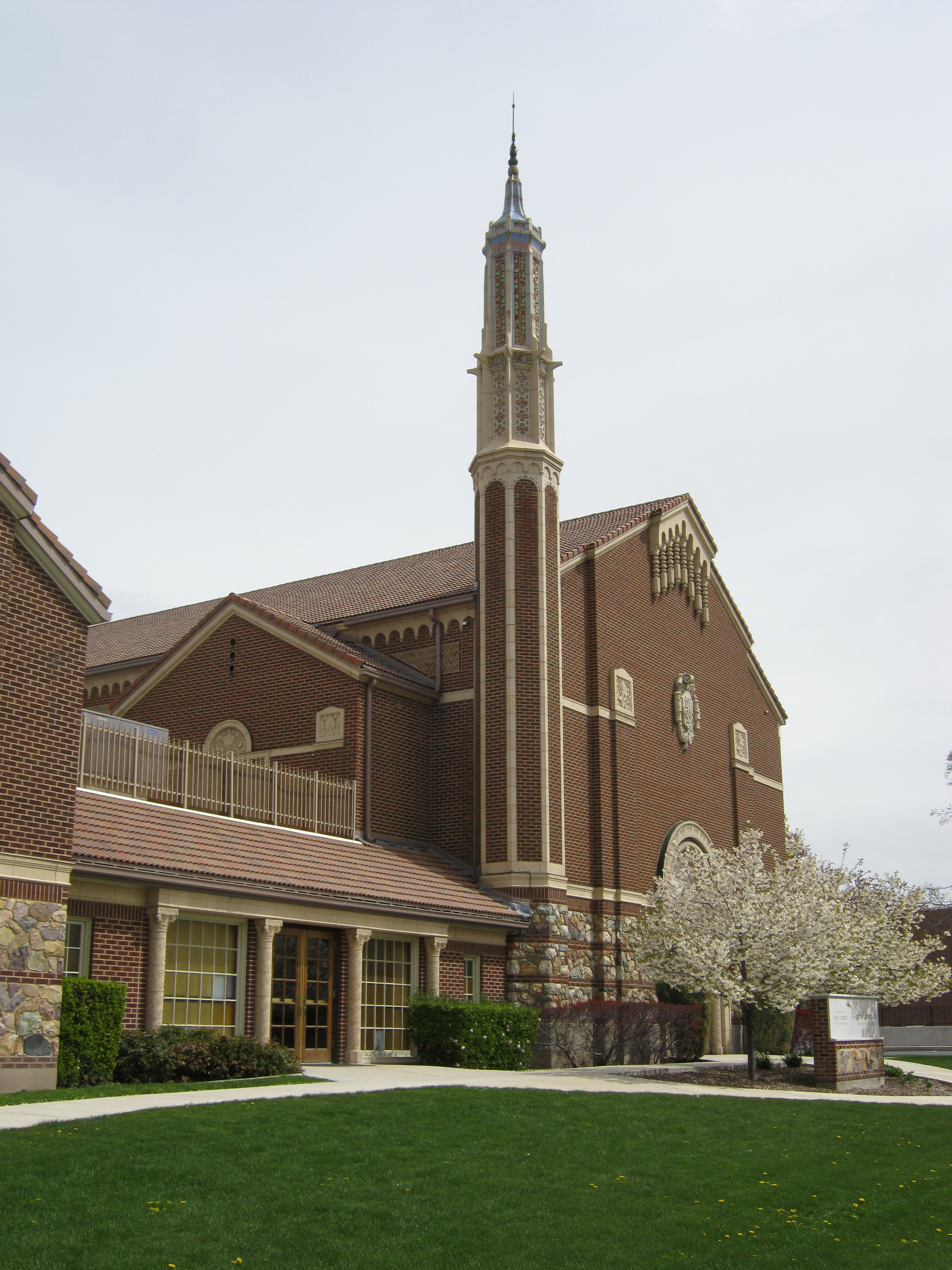
- The Granite Stake Tabernacle in 2011

- Location within Utah Location within the United States
- Location: 2005 South 900 East, Salt Lake City, Utah
- Coordinates: 40°43′35″N 111°51′52″W
- Area: 1.78 acres (0.72 ha)
- Built: 1930
- Architect: Edward O. Anderson and Lorenzo Snow Young
- Architectural style: Early Christian/Byzantine
- NRHP reference No.: 03000630
- Added to NRHP: July 11, 2003

The Granite Stake Tabernacle is a tabernacle of the Church of Jesus Christ of Latter-day Saints in the Sugar House District of Salt Lake City, Utah, United States. It has historic significance to the area and was listed in the U.S. National Register of Historic Places in 2003 (a nomination the LDS church itself opposed).

== First Granite Stake Tabernacle ==
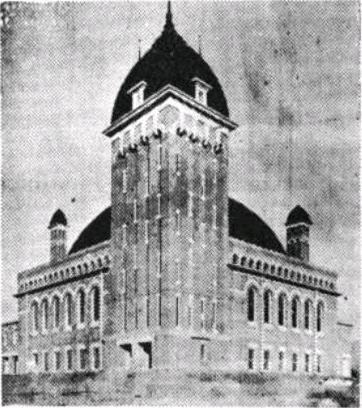
The first Granite Stake Tabernacle (1901-1956)

The first tabernacle used for the Cottonwood and Granite stakes was located on the corner of 33rd South and State street and was constructed in 1903. Joseph F. Smith dedicated the building on December 27, 1903. Due to congregational boundary divisions in 1929, what was known as the Granite Stake Tabernacle was actually within the Grant Stake boundaries and was renamed the Grant Stake Tabernacle. The Grant Stake Tabernacle was razed in 1956.

== Construction of the Second Granite Stake Tabernacle ==
The second and current Granite Stake Tabernacle was designed by two young architects, Edward O. Anderson and Lorenzo Snow Young, who would later make an impact on the architecture of many other buildings for the Church of Jesus Christ of Latter-day Saints. Fundraising for the construction was done by members of the local area. The construction began in 1929, and required the demolition of four homes on the property including the childhood home of Stephen L. Richards. The building was completed in March 1930 at a cost of US$225,000. LDS Church policy mandated that buildings would not be dedicated until they were paid off in full. Due to the Depression, the tabernacle wasn't dedicated until June 1938 by LDS Church President Heber J. Grant. In 1951 the tabernacle had an additional chapel built adjacent to the original structure for the Lincoln Ward's weekly meetings.

== Current use ==
The tabernacle continues to function as a gathering place for multiple wards (congregations), but also serves as a meetinghouse for regular Sunday services for the Dai Ichi (Japanese) ward.
