= Sugar House Monument =

Monument in Salt Lake City, Utah, U.S.

- U.S. National Register of Historic Places
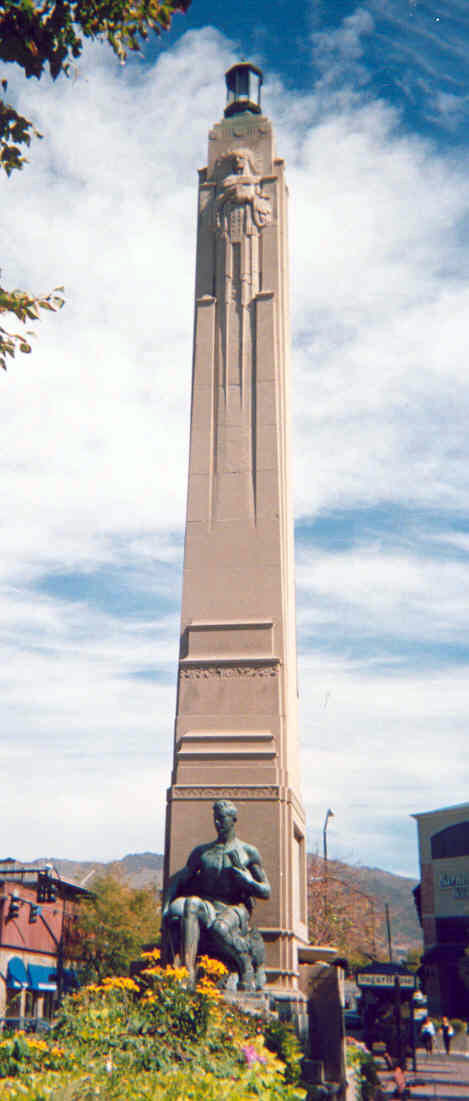
- Monument in 2004

- Location within Utah Location within the United States
- Location: 1100 East and 2100 South, Salt Lake City, Utah
- Coordinates: 40°43′32″N 111°51′34″W
- Area: less than one acre
- Built: 1930
- Architect: Malin, Millard F.; Anderson, Edward Oliver, et al.
- Architectural style: Art Deco
- MPS: Sugar House Business District MPS
- NRHP reference No.: 03000638
- Added to NRHP: July 11, 2003

Erected in 1930, the Sugar House Monument has long stood as a testament to the hard work of early Salt Lake pioneers making the valley sustainable.

In 1855, city leaders and early Mormon settlers sought to create the first factory in the western United States to process beets into refined sugar. They decided to purchase the machinery needed for a newly invented process to produce sugar from sugar beets. A mill was built in downtown Sugar House to house the machinery. The process was a failure and in the summer of 1855, Brigham Young ordered the mill to shut down. The old sugar mill building was then converted to a paper factory in 1860, then a bucket factory and finally a machine shop for the Utah Central Railroad until 1928. Despite the failed sugar mill, Sugar House prospered as Salt Lake's second downtown thanks to local merchants and a bustling streetcar system.

In the 1920s, sculptor Millard F. Malin pitched the idea of erecting a monument in honor of early manufacturing to the Sugar House Business Men's League. The league and the city of Salt Lake jointly funded the $2,000 monument sculpted by Malin and his two fellow artists; Edward Anderson and Lorenzo Young. The monument was completed and dedicated on November 11, 1934. The obelisk stands approximately 200 feet east of the original site of a Mormon Pioneer sugar mill.

Malin describes the monument as:

a fifty foot shaft topped by a light. Near the top, the shaft blended into two Indian figures in relief, about eight feet tall, representing the passing of the red man. The Indian facing eastward, militant, holds war implements, and the one facing westward, defeated holds a peace pipe. At the foot of the shaft, facing eastward and westward, are two eight foot figures. The female figure facing eastward represents the Salt Lake Valley in all its productiveness... The male figure facing westward, pouring water from an urn over a wheel, represents a mill builder... On the sides of the shaft between the two figures were two bas-reliefs representing, on the north side, the original old sugar mill, and on the south side, a fur-trading scene in Mr. Smoot's old trading post which once occupied that corner. (The latter plaque has never been completed. The one on the north side, representing the old sugar mill, was added to the monument in 1948)

The plaque reads "May the spirit of this courageous venture continue to characterize this community".

It was listed on the National Register of Historic Places in 2003.

== See also ==
- National Register of Historic Places listings in Salt Lake City
