= Edward O. Anderson =

American architect (1891–1977)

Edward Oliver Anderson
- Born: May 16, 1891
- Died: August 9, 1977 (aged 86)
- Education: Brigham Young High School; University of Utah
- Occupation: Architect

Edward Oliver Anderson (May 16, 1891 – August 9, 1977) was an American architect based in Salt Lake City, Utah. He was noted as the general architect for The Church of Jesus Christ of Latter-day Saints (LDS Church), designing and overseeing construction of many church buildings.

== Early career ==
Anderson began his education at Brigham Young High School in 1910, and then the University of Utah from 1914 to 1915. He left Utah to study architecture at Carnegie Tech from 1919 to 1922. While in Pittsburgh, Pennsylvania, he worked as a draftsman for architects Edward B. Lee and Alden & Harlow. In 1924 he returned to Utah and trained with Cannon & Fetzer and Pope & Burton before starting his own firm.

== Anderson & Young ==
From about 1928 to 1936, Anderson was part of the firm of Anderson and Young with Lorenzo Snow "Bing" Young. Their first major project was Kingsbury Hall at the University of Utah followed by the Granite Stake Tabernacle, both of which are listed on the U.S. National Register of Historic Places. He contributed to the design of many other civic buildings in Utah, being involved with the renovation of Salt Lake City Council Hall. Anderson was a member of the American Institute of Architects for most of his life and was the president of the Utah Chapter from 1935 to 1936.

== LDS Church architect ==
From 1943 to 1949, Anderson was the general church architect for the LDS Church. During the 1950s, he continued designing for the church, but mainly focused on the design of temples. In the early 1950s, Anderson was asked by David O. McKay to design a smaller temples for areas with lower LDS populations. Shortly after Anderson began work on his design, plans were announced to build the Swiss Temple. As part of this project, Anderson designed and supervised the construction of a one-twelfth scale model of a room where a film of the temple ordinances could be presented to overcome the fact that there would be patrons at the Swiss Temple speaking at least ten languages. Aside from the Swiss Temple, Anderson designed the Los Angeles California Temple, London England Temple, and Hamilton New Zealand Temple. Of the four temples that Anderson designed, all have a single spire design. He was connected also with the mid-20th century remodelings of the Salt Lake Temple, the Manti Utah Temple, and the St. George Utah Temple.

== Personal life ==
Anderson was born in Richfield, Utah. While at the University of Utah, Anderson became friends with Millard F. Malin, who later became the artist that Anderson used for sculpting parts of the temples that he designed, including the Angel Moroni statues that topped each spire.

== Images of works ==
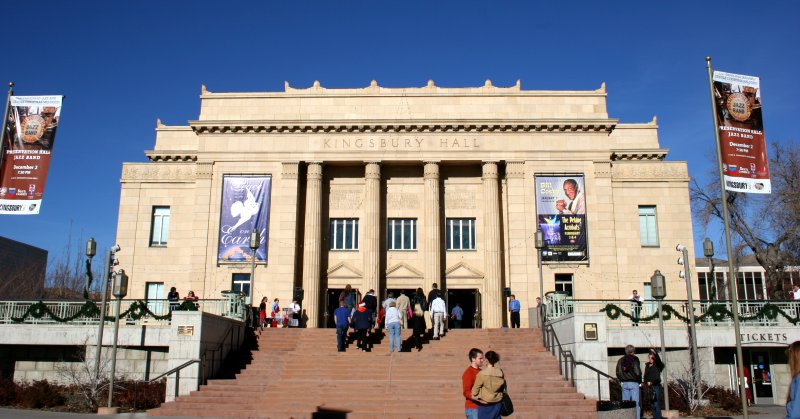
Kingsbury Hall (1928)*NRHP listed as part of University of Utah Circle

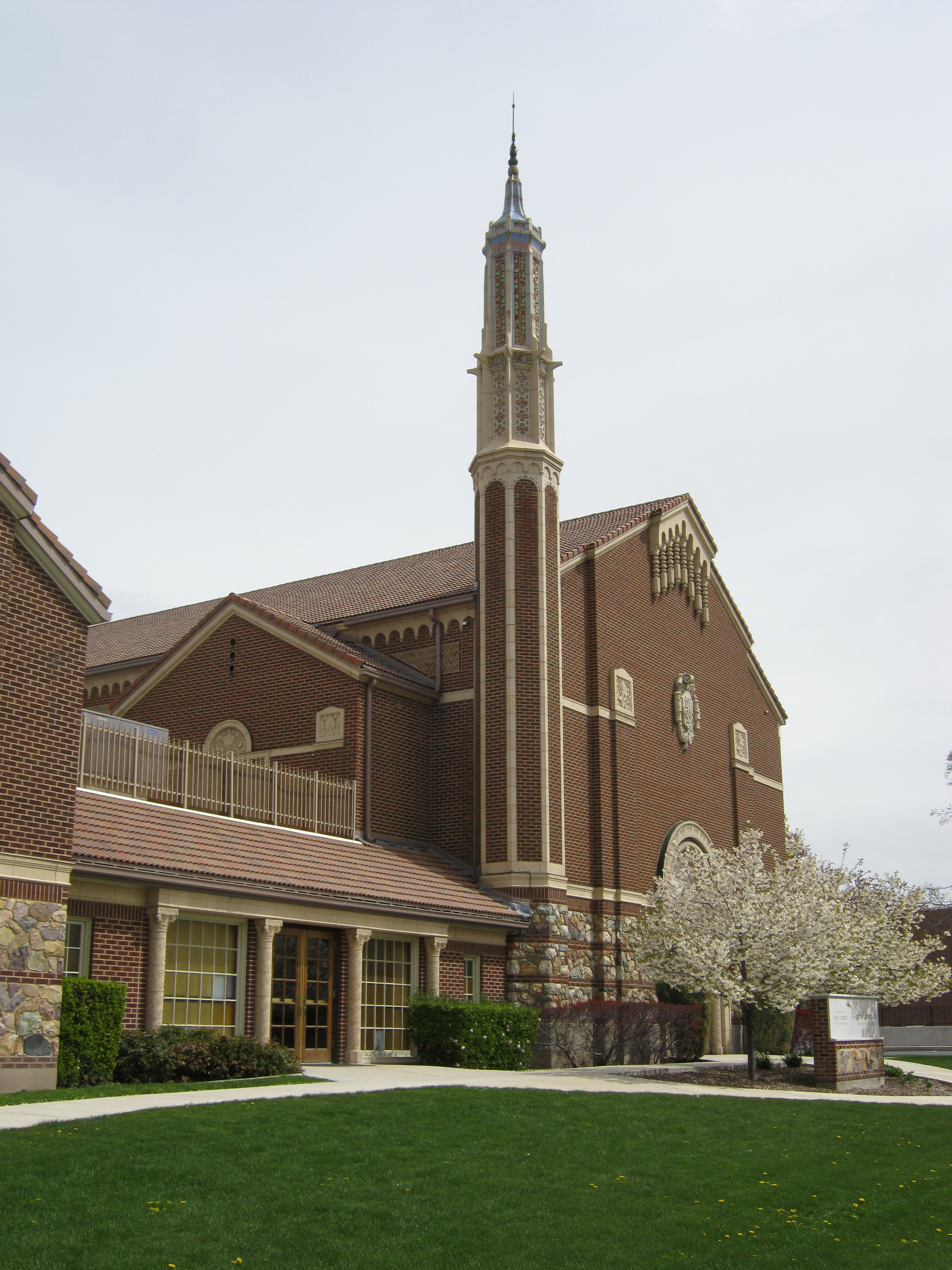
Granite Stake Tabernacle (1930)*NRHP listed

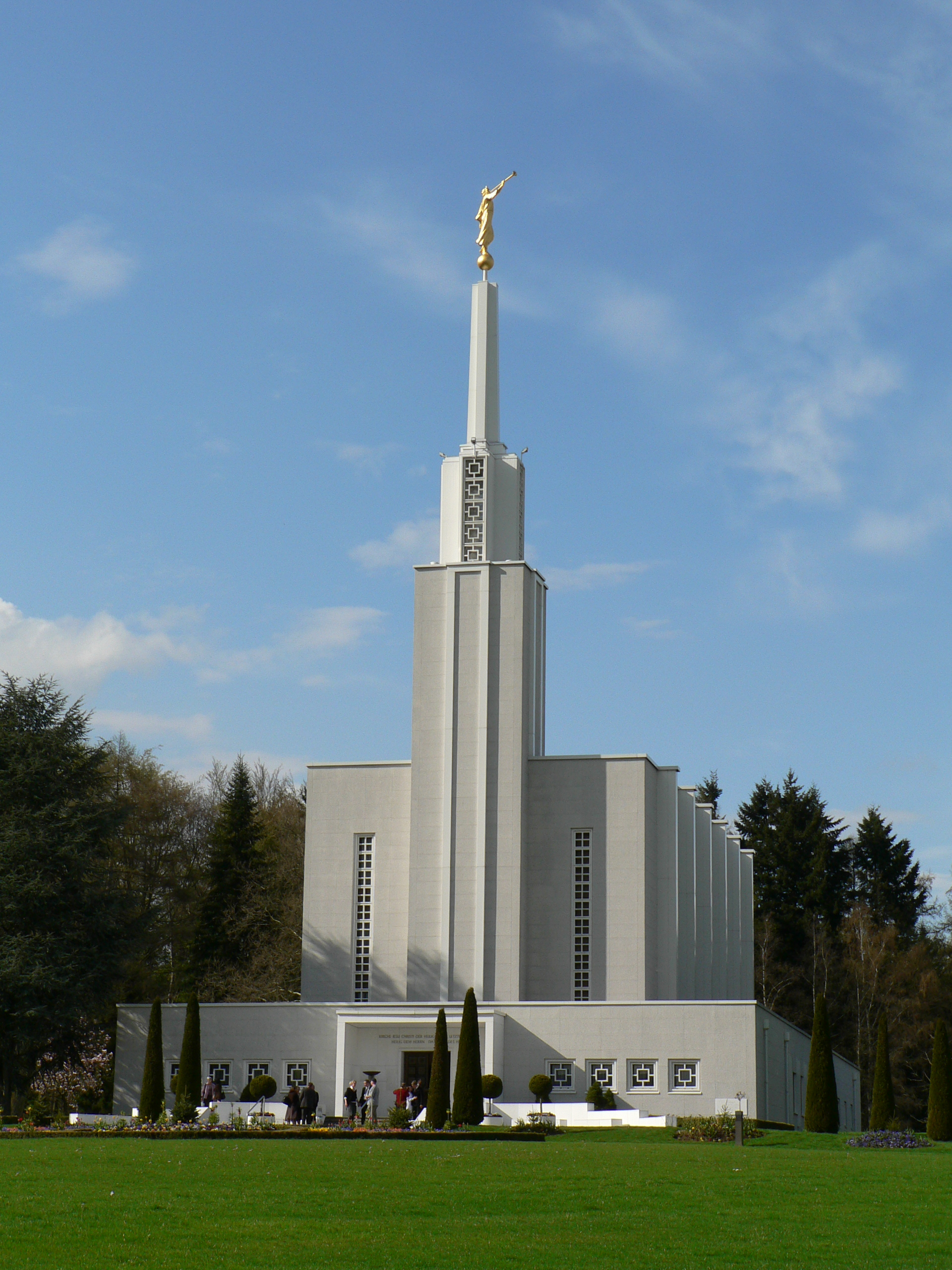
Bern Switzerland Temple

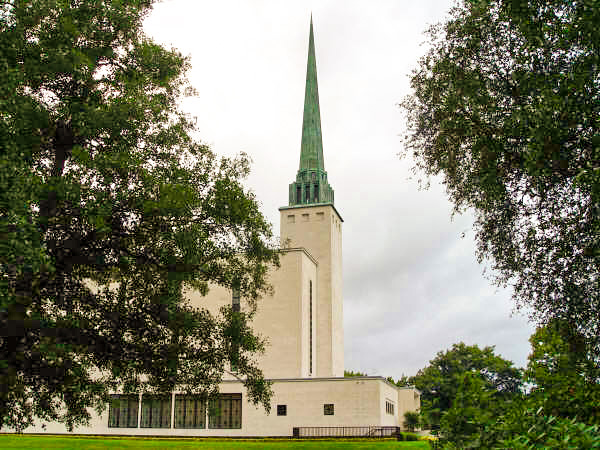
London England Temple

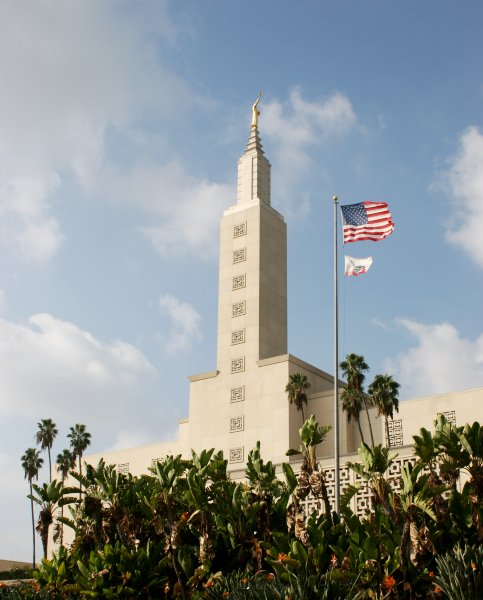
Los Angeles California Temple

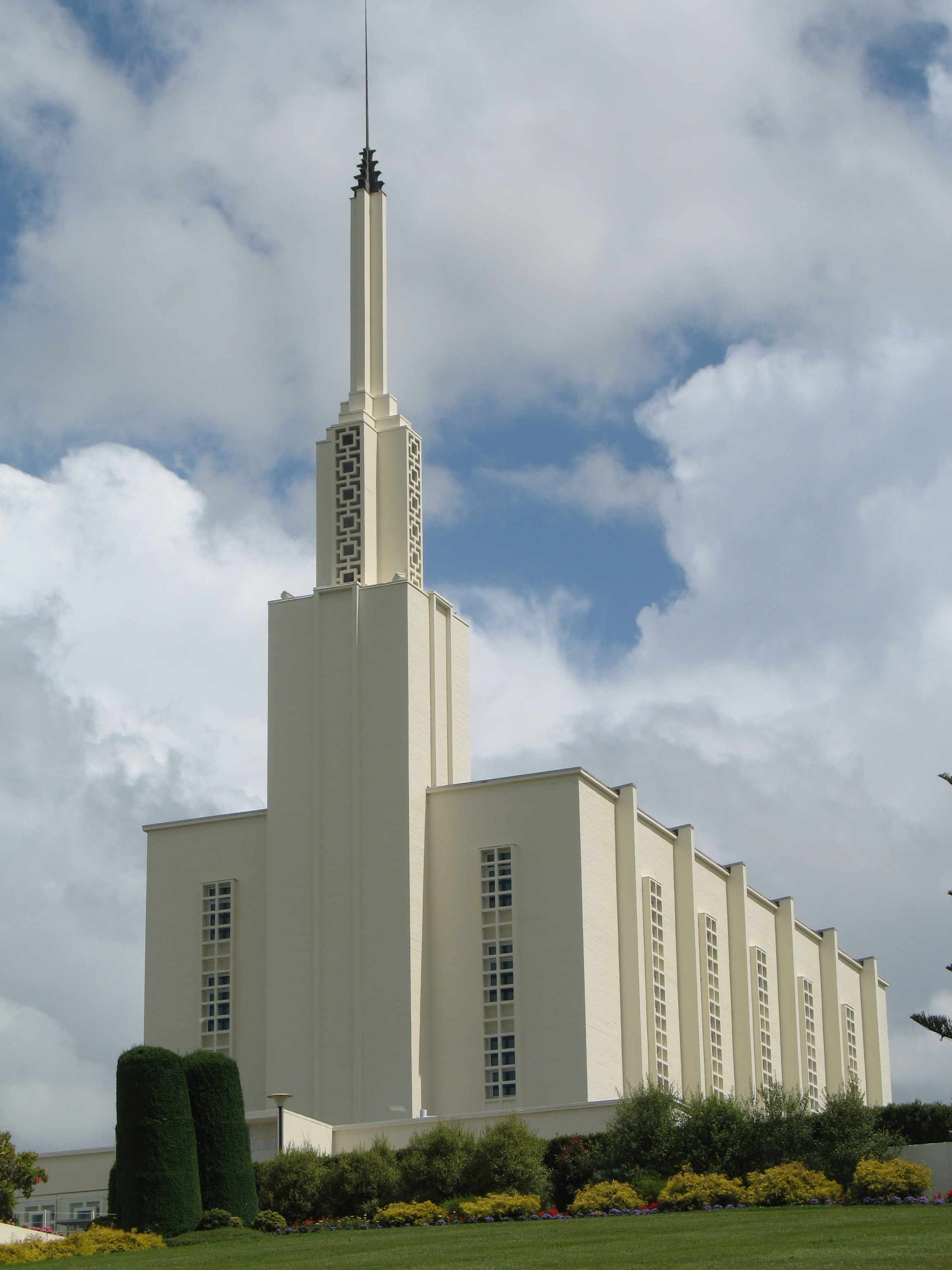
Hamilton New Zealand Temple
