= Statue of Ezra Cornell =

Statue at Cornell University

Ezra Cornell
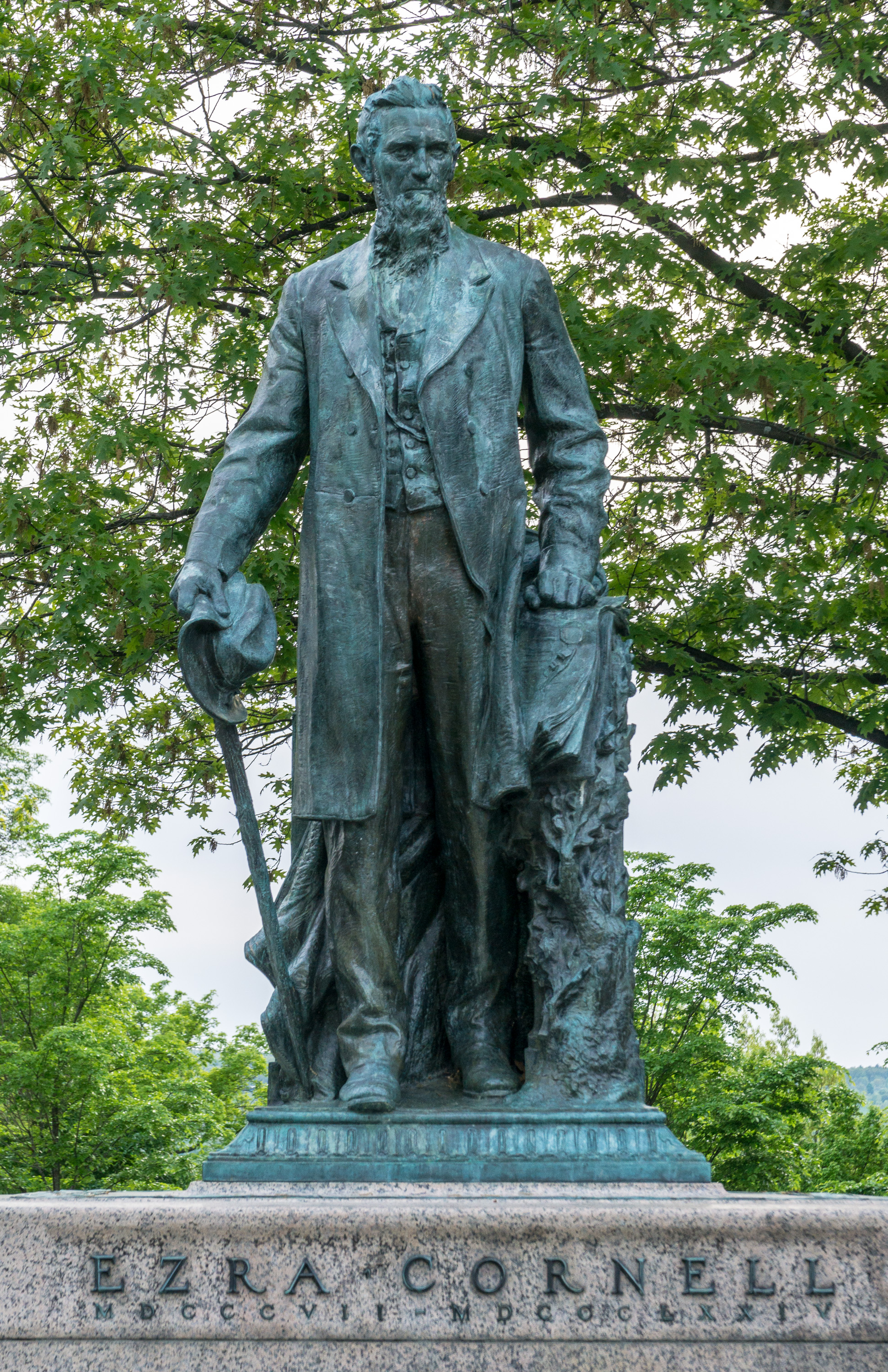
- The statue in 2018
- Interactive map of Ezra Cornell
- Location: Arts Quad, Ithaca, New York, U.S.
- Coordinates: 42°26′56.4″N 76°29′6.7″W
- Designer: Hermon Atkins MacNeil
- Type: Statue
- Material: Bronze; Granite
- Beginning date: 1915
- Completion date: 1917
- Dedicated date: June 22, 1919
- Dedicated to: Ezra Cornell

Ezra Cornell is a monumental statue on the Arts Quad on the campus of Cornell University in Ithaca, New York. The monument honors Ezra Cornell, the university's co-founder and namesake. The statue, designed by Hermon Atkins MacNeil, was dedicated in June 1919.

== History ==
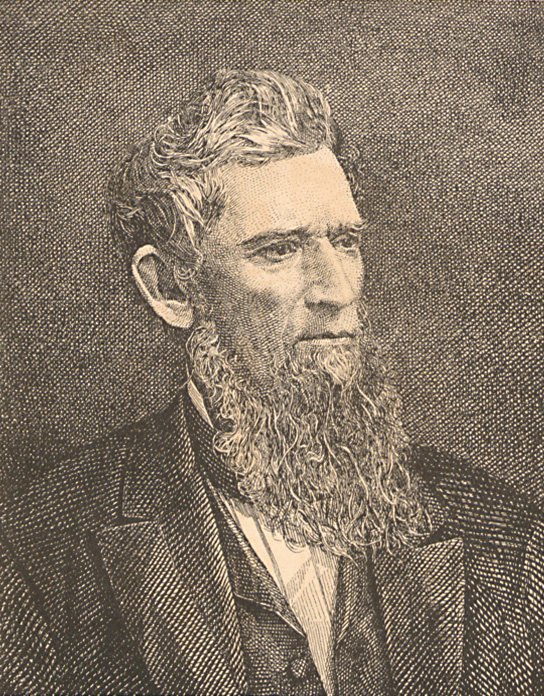
The 1867 engraving of Ezra Cornell, the university's co-founder and namesake, from which the statue was dedicated in June 1919

=== 19th century ===
Ezra Cornell was born on January 11, 1807, in Westchester County, New York. In 1828, he moved to Ithaca, New York, where he managed a flouring mill and other factories along the Fall Creek. In the 1840s, after becoming acquainted with Samuel Morse, Cornell became involved in the creation of telegraph lines in the Northeastern United States, and in 1855 he founded the Western Union Telegraph Company. Despite retiring in 1858, Cornell remained active in politics and philanthropy. As a Republican, he served on the New York State Assembly and later the New York State Senate throughout the 1860s and established a public library in Ithaca in 1863. During this time, Cornell also became involved in the creation of Cornell University in Ithaca. In 1865, Cornell became the chairman of the Cornell University Board of Trustees, a position he would hold until his death, and he proceeded to help the newly established institution grow by securing its designation as New York's land-grant university and donating 200 acres (81 ha) of land and $500,000 in cash. Cornell died in Ithaca on December 9, 1874.

=== 20th century ===
The idea for a public statue honoring Ezra Cornell was put forth by students in 1906, with the idea of dedicating it on the centennial of Ezra's birth, but this idea did not come to fruition. In 1915, the Board of Trustees commissioned sculptor Hermon Atkins MacNeil to design a bronze statue honoring their university's namesake. MacNeil, a graduate of the Massachusetts Normal Art School, had taught art classes at Cornell in the 1880s, including "Industrial art" for the university's Sibley College. He was hired by Robert H. Thurston, the dean of the mechanical engineering program at Cornell, who later encouraged MacNeil to further his training in Europe. The contract for the statue awarded to MacNeil was for $25,000. MacNeil worked on the statue between 1915 and 1917. Speaking later of the statue, MacNeil stated that its construction was a labor of love, because Ezra looked like MacNeil's own father. By 1918, work on the location for the statue was started, and in May, the foundation for the pedestal was placed between Morrill Hall and McGraw Hall. During this work, an old cistern, which used to be part of the university's water system, was uncovered.

==== Dedication ====
The dedication celebrations for the statue were originally set to occur on October 8, 1918, with a military parade and procession to take place as part of semicentennial celebrations for the university. However, World War I caused these celebrations to be postponed. The celebrations were instead rescheduled to June 20–22, 1919, with the university's commencement to be held the day after these celebrations. The statue was officially unveiled on June 22, with Mary Cornell, Ezra's only living child, doing the unveiling. The year after the statue's dedication, images of the monument were displayed at an annual exhibition held by the Architectural League of New York.

== Vandalism ==
Since its dedication in 1919, the statue has been the subject of at least three acts of vandalism.

- In 1985, the statue was doused in light-blue paint by Columbia University students following an incident where the scepter of Alma Mater was stolen by Cornell students.
- In 2017, antisemitic posters and fliers were posted on both the statue and several buildings around the campus.
- In 2020, during nationwide George Floyd protests, the base of the monument was graffitied with the phrase "I can't breathe". The base was later covered prior to its cleanup.

== Design ==
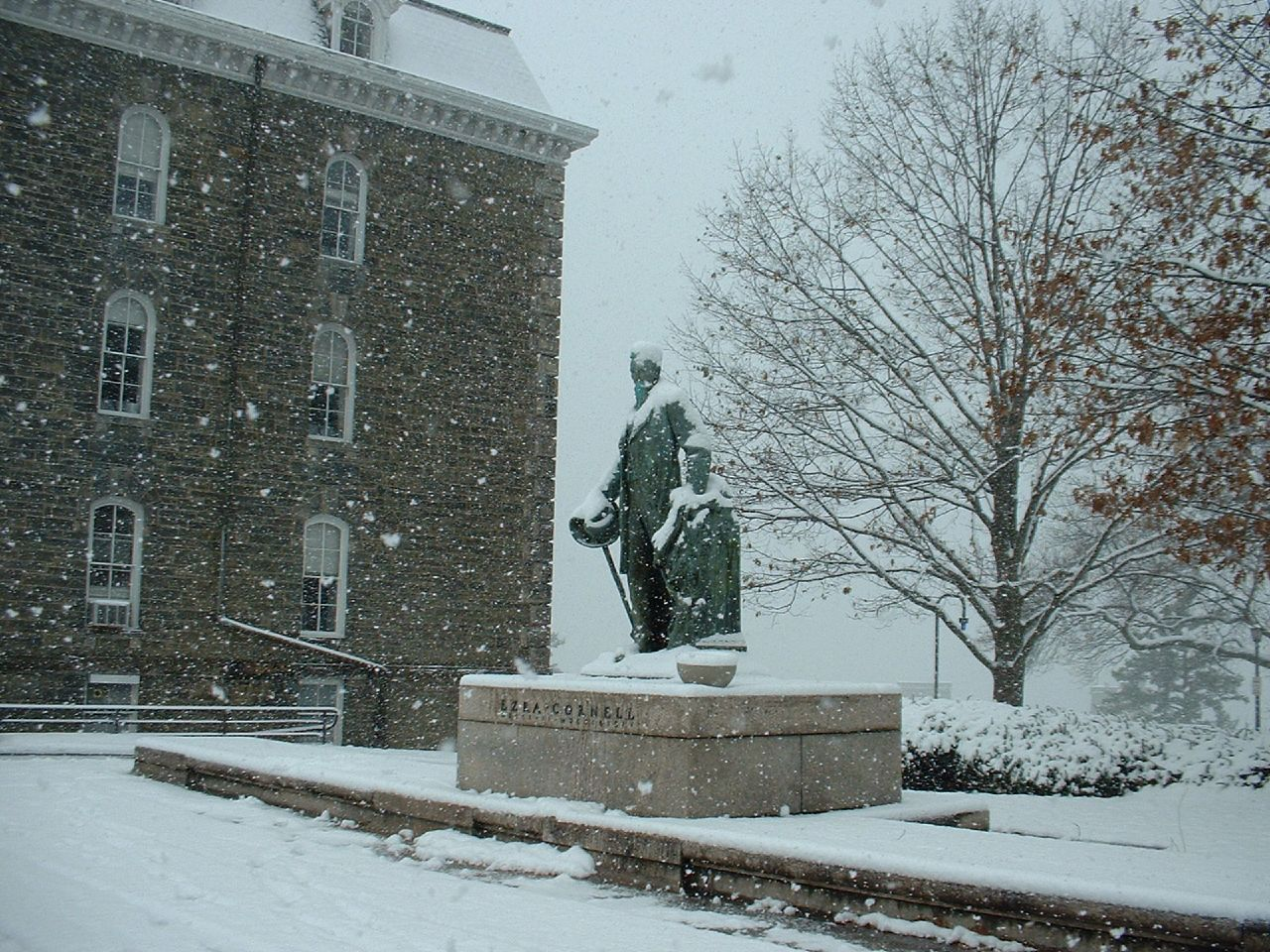
The Statue of Ezra Cornell during a snowstorm

The monument consists of a bronze statue of Cornell atop a red granite pedestal. The statue is 9 feet (2.7 m) tall, while the pedestal covers an area of 10 feet (3.0 m) by 8 feet (2.4 m). The pedestal rests on a stone platform that covers an area of 50 feet (15 m) by 20 feet (6.1 m). The pedestal is also surrounded by a granite bench which extends on either side of the statue along the length of 50 feet (15 m). On the front of the pedestal is inscribed the following:

EZRA CORNELL
MDCCCVII–MDCCCLXXIV

The statue depicts Cornell wearing a frock coat, with a wide-brimmed hat in his right hand, which is resting on a walking cane. His left hand rests on a base, on top of which is the charter for the university. At the bottom of this base is an oak sprig. Behind Cornell is a Morse telegraph. Cornell faces across the quad, and the statue is located across the quad from a statue of Andrew Dickson White.

== See also ==
- 1919 in art

== Bibliography ==
- Bogel-Burroughs, Nicholas; Delwiche, Anna (October 23, 2017). "Anti-Semitic Posters Appear on Ezra Cornell Statue, Campus Buildings". The Cornell Daily Sun. Archived from the original on November 13, 2020.
- Cline, J. H. (2007). Standing Liberty Quarters (4th ed.). Zyrus Press. ISBN 978-1-933990-00-2 – via Google Books.
- Coin, Glenn (February 27, 2018). "Anti-Semitic incidents nearly doubled in New York in 2017: report". NewYorkUpstate.com. Advance Publications. Archived from the original on November 17, 2018.
- "Cornell Alumni News". Cornell Alumni News. XXI (1): 1. September 26, 1918 – via Google Books.
- "The Ezra Files: The founder's statue is dedicated". Cornell Chronicle. Cornell University. November 6, 2007. Archived from the original on September 7, 2015.
- Guide to the Campus of Cornell University. Cornell University. 1920 – via Google Books.
- Dearinger, David B., ed. (2004). Paintings and Sculpture in the Collection of the National Academy of Design: 1826-1925. Vol. I. Hudson Hills Press. ISBN 978-1-55595-029-3 – via Google Books.
- McSpadden, J. Walker (1924). Famous Sculptors of America. Dodd, Mead & Co. – via Google Books.
- Moon, Francis C. (2007). The Machines of Leonardo Da Vinci and Franz Reuleaux: Kinematics of Machines from the Renaissance to the 20th Century. Springer Science+Business Media. ISBN 978-1-4020-5599-7 – via Google Books.
- Patterson, Woodford (April 1919). "Cornell's Semi-Centennial". The Cornell Countryman. XVI (3): 131 – via Google Books.
- Stamm, Kathryn (June 2, 2020). "Ezra Cornell Statue Temporarily Reads 'I Can't Breathe' Before Being Covered". The Cornell Daily Sun. Archived from the original on September 18, 2020.
- Steecker, Matt (June 2, 2020). "As graffiti appears around the city protesting death of George Floyd, Ithacans sympathize". The Ithaca Journal. Gannett. Archived from the original on September 27, 2020.
- "The Architectural League Exhibit". Stone. XLI (3): 127–128. March 1920 – via Google Books.
- "Ezra Cornell Statue". The Cornell Civil Engineer. 25 (8): 413. May 1917 – via Google Books.
- "STATUE OF EZRA CORNELL A MEMORIAL". The Cornell Daily Sun. Vol. XXVI, no. 124. March 13, 1906 – via Cornell University Library.
- "A STATUE OF EZRA CORNELL". The Cornell Daily Sun. Vol. XXVIII, no. 125. March 14, 1908 – via Cornell University Library.
- "STATUE OF EZRA CORNELL NOW UNDER CONSTRUCTION". The Cornell Daily Sun. Vol. XXXVIII, no. 176. May 7, 1918 – via Cornell University Library.
- Tolles, Thayer, ed. (2001). American Sculpture in the Metropolitan Museum of Art: A catalogue of works by artists born between 1865 and 1885. Vol. II. Yale University Press. ISBN 978-0-87099-923-9 – via Google Books.
