= Bern Switzerland Temple =

Temple of the Latter Day Saints in Switzerland

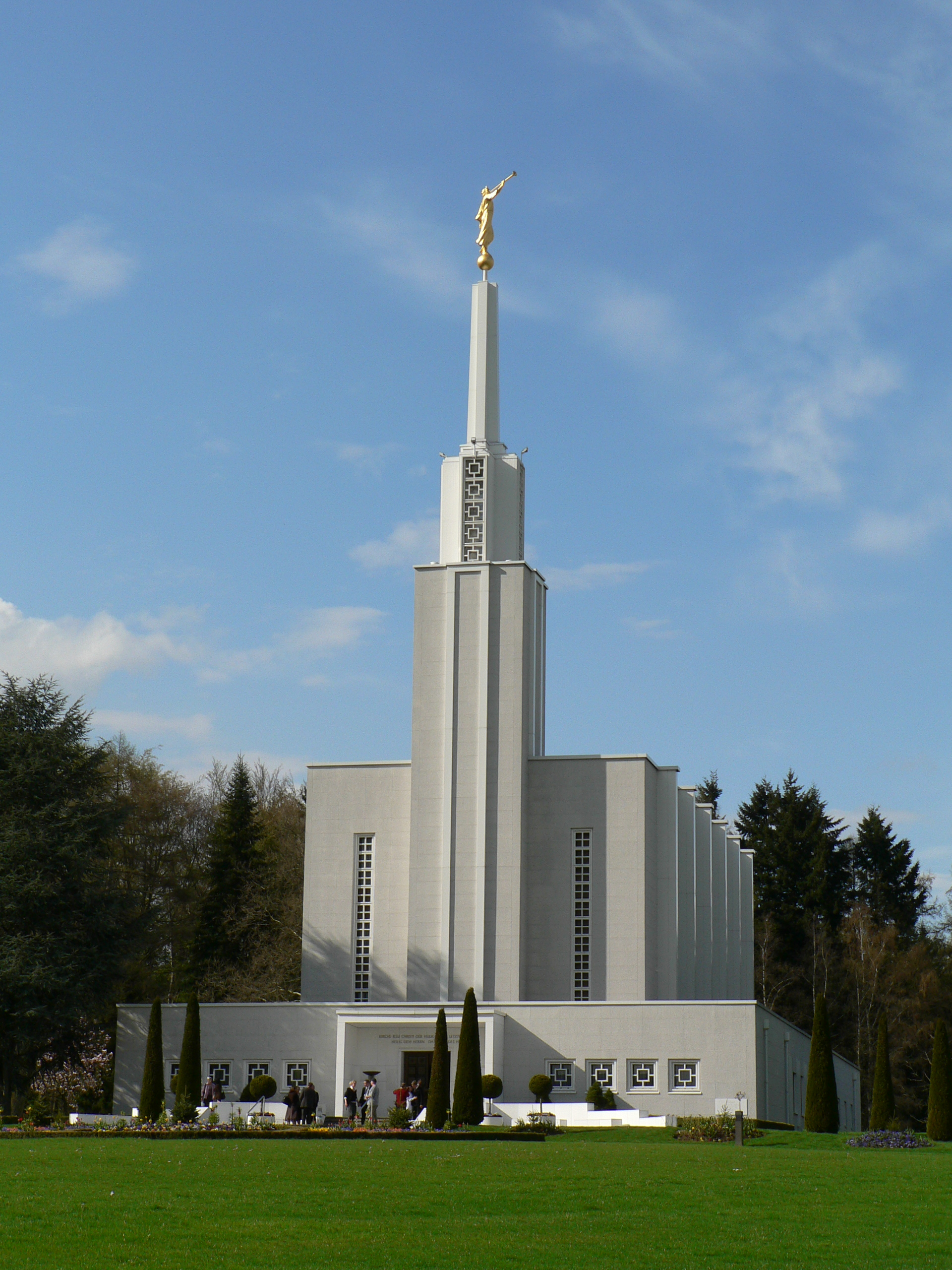
- Interactive map of Bern Switzerland Temple
- Number: 9
- Dedication: 11 September 1955, by David O. McKay
- Site: 7 acres (2.8 ha)
- Floor area: 35,546 ft^{2} (3,302.3 m^{2})
- Height: 140 ft (43 m)
- Official website • News & images

Church chronology
← Idaho Falls Idaho Temple	Bern Switzerland Temple	→ Los Angeles California Temple

Additional information
- Announced: 1 July 1952, by David O. McKay
- Groundbreaking: 5 August 1953, by David O. McKay
- Open house: 9–10 September 1955; 8–17 October 1992
- Rededicated: 23 November 1992, by Gordon B. Hinckley
- Current president: Martin Andreas Müller
- Designed by: Edward O. Anderson
- Location: Münchenbuchsee, Switzerland
- Coordinates: 47°0′7.891200″N 7°27′29.67839″E
- Exterior finish: Cream terra cotta
- Design: Modern, single spire
- Baptistries: 1
- Ordinance rooms: 4 (stationary)
- Sealing rooms: 7
- Clothing rental: Yes
- Notes: Bern was the first temple to present the endowment using a movie, necessitated by the multiple languages required to support the members in Europe.

The Bern Switzerland Temple (formerly the Swiss Temple) is a temple of the Church of Jesus Christ of Latter-day Saints (LDS Church) located in Münchenbuchsee, Switzerland. It was the church's first temple in Europe and the second outside of North America, after the Laie Hawaii Temple. The intent to build the temple was announced on 1 July 1952, by church president David O. McKay.

The temple was designed by church architect Edward O. Anderson, and the plans were redrawn into German specifications by Wilhelm Zimmer. The temple's architecture uses a modern-contemporary style. A groundbreaking ceremony, to signify the beginning of construction, was held on August 5, 1953.

== History ==
There have been church members in Switzerland since the mid-19th century. The church's first missionary entered Switzerland in 1850, with the encouragement of Lorenzo Snow of the Quorum of the Twelve Apostles, who was attempting to establish a mission in Italy and surrounding countries. Snow visited Switzerland in February 1851 to dedicate the land for missionary work, and in March 1851 the first Swiss converts were baptized. As of October 2024, there are over 9,000 church members in Switzerland.

The 2.8-hectare (7-acre) lot was selected in July 1952 by LDS Church president David O. McKay and Samuel E. Bringhurst, then president of the Swiss-Austrian Mission. The architects were Edward O. Anderson and Wilhelm Zimmer. Groundbreaking and dedication of the lot were performed by McKay on 5 August 1953, who later dedicated the temple on 11 September 1955. The temple was known as the "Swiss Temple" until the current naming convention for temples was adopted in the late 1990s.

The Bern Switzerland Temple has four ordinance rooms, seven sealing rooms, and a total floor area of 3,302.3 square metres (35,546 sq ft). Its temple district includes stakes in France, Switzerland, and the district in Jerusalem, Israel.

Originally, presentation of the endowment was particularly challenging, since it was the first international temple, requiring many different languages for its patrons. This was solved by using a film, dubbed in all required languages. Gordon B. Hinckley, as a church employee, supervised the initial making of the film and was responsible for transporting it to Switzerland. The Los Angeles California Temple, which was dedicated in 1956, was the last one designed for live endowments; since then all new temples have been equipped with recordings instead of live presentations by temple workers. For several decades, only the Manti Utah and Salt Lake temples used live presentations, but the church announced in 2021 that both temples would convert to the use of a film after extensive remodeling.

In early 1990, the temple closed for renovations. After the complete renewal of the interior, the temple was rededicated by Hinckley, who was then a member of church's First Presidency, on 23 October 1992. In connection with the fiftieth anniversary of its dedication, a 4-metre-tall (13 ft) statue of the angel Moroni was placed on top of the tower on 7 September 2005.

The temple is featured briefly in the Woodkid music videos for "Iron" and "Run Boy Run". Though the building is located in Münchenbuchsee, its postal address is assigned to the neighboring municipality of Zollikofen.

In 2020, like all the church's others, the Bern Switzerland Temple was closed for a time in response to the COVID-19 pandemic.

== Design and architecture ==
The building has a modern-contemporary architectural style coupled with a traditional Latter-day Saint temple design. Designed by Edward O. Anderson and Wilhelm Zimmer, the architecture reflects both the cultural heritage of Bern and its spiritual significance to the church.

The temple is on a 7-acre plot, and surrounding landscaping of gardens, hedges, trees, and grass fields.

The structure is 140 feet tall, and is constructed with reinforced concrete with gray terracotta trimmed in white. The exterior has a single spire with a statue of the angel Moroni on its top.

The temple includes a baptistry, four ordinance rooms, and seven sealing rooms, each designed for ceremonial use.

The design has elements representing Latter-day Saint symbolism, which provide deeper spiritual meaning to its appearance and function. Symbolism is important to church members. The temple itself is a symbol, being a "house of the Lord" and as a symbol of faith. This temple in particular is one of "...the Church's most visible and oldest structural manifestations of growth and dedication."

== Renovations ==
Over the years, the temple has undergone several renovations to preserve its structural integrity, update facilities, and enhance its spiritual and aesthetic appeal. The most significant renovation project commenced in 1990.

Renovations focused on key areas, including expanding and modernizing the temple. These changes ensure its compliance with contemporary building standards and accommodates the needs of church members.

One aspect of the renovation was the addition of more ordinance rooms; the pre-existing single 250-seat auditorium was replaced by four 70-seat ordinance rooms. This allowed a new endowment session to begin every half hour instead of every two hours. The renovated temple was rededicated in 10 sessions from October 23–25, 1992, by Gordon B. Hinckley.

== Temple presidents ==
The church's temples are directed by a temple president and matron, each serving for a term of three years. The president and matron oversee the administration of temple operations and provide guidance and training for both temple patrons and staff.

Serving from 1955 to 1957, the first president was Samuel E. Bringhurst, with Lenora K. Bringhurst being the matron. As of 2024, Franz R. Gaag is the president, with Fabiola D. Gaag serving as matron.

== Admittance ==
Following completion of the temple, the church announced that the public open house that was held from September 9–10, 1955. The temple was dedicated by David O. McKay in 10 sessions from September 11–15, 1955. After the temple's 1990–1992 renovation period, another open house was held, from October 8–17, 1992. During that open house, almost 33,000 people toured the temple. The temple was rededicated from October 23–25, 1992, by Gordon B. Hinckley in 10 sessions.

Like all the church's temples, it is not used for Sunday worship services. To members of the church, temples are regarded as sacred houses of the Lord. Once dedicated, only church members with a current temple recommend can enter for worship.

== See also ==
- Comparison of temples of The Church of Jesus Christ of Latter-day Saints
- List of temples of The Church of Jesus Christ of Latter-day Saints
- List of temples of The Church of Jesus Christ of Latter-day Saints by geographic region
- Temple architecture (Latter-day Saints)
- The Church of Jesus Christ of Latter-day Saints in Switzerland
