= University of Utah Circle =

Historic district in Salt Lake City, Utah, U.S.

- U.S. National Register of Historic Places
- U.S. Historic district
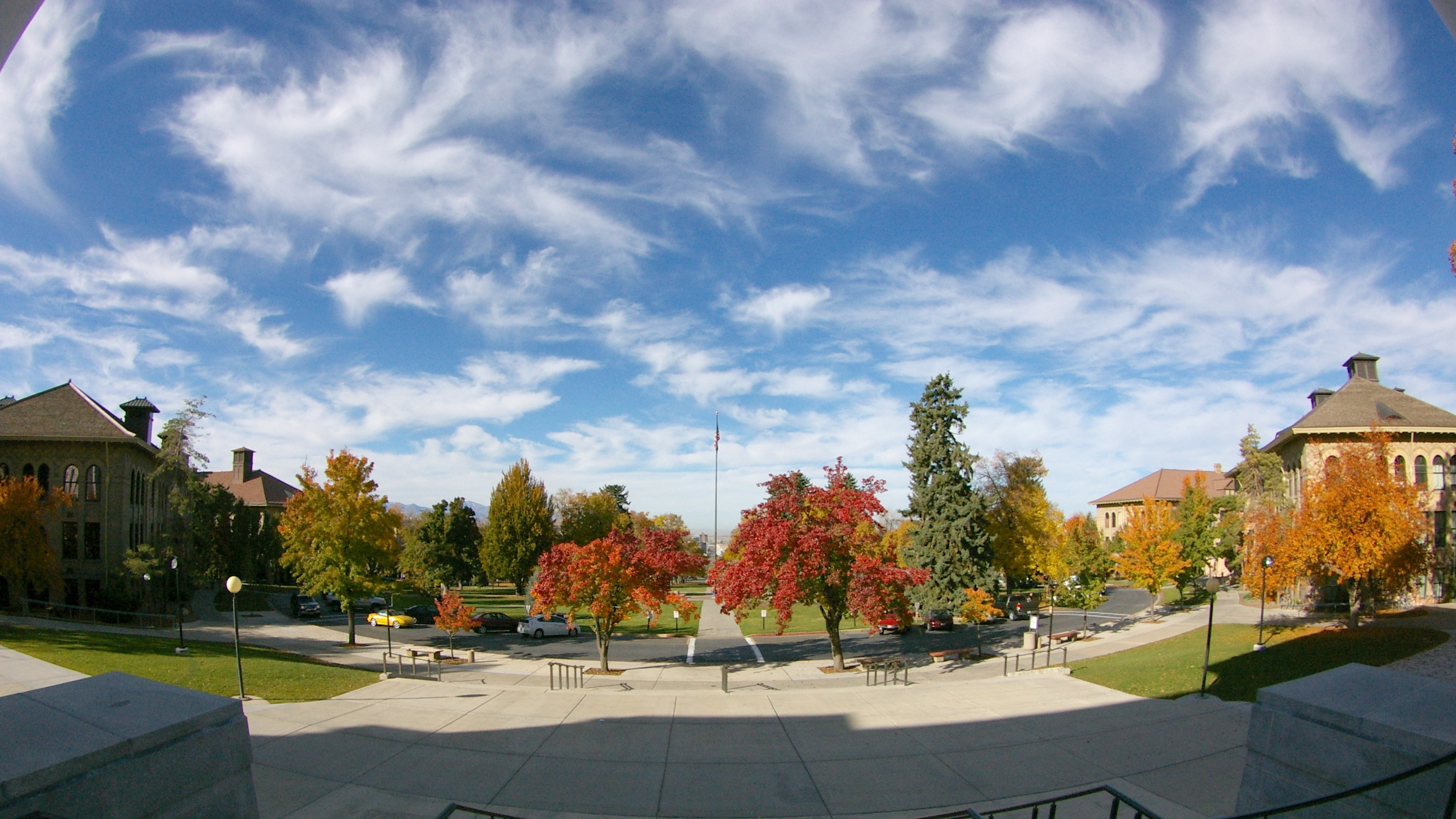
- A view of the University of Utah Circle, November 2010

- Location within Utah Location within the United States
- Location: University of Utah; Salt Lake City, Utah; United States
- Coordinates: 40°45′54″N 111°50′59″W
- Built: 1901 - 1935
- Architect: Multiple (Richard Kletting; Cannon, Fetzer, Hansen; Ashton & Evans)
- NRHP reference No.: 78002682
- Added to NRHP: 1978

The University of Utah Circle, also known as Presidents Circle, is located on the campus of the University of Utah in Salt Lake City, Utah, United States. It was listed on the National Register of Historic Places in 1978 as a historic district.

== History ==
In 1900 the University of Utah moved to the current east-bench campus on land that used to belong to Fort Douglas. The four original buildings, which are currently known as the John Widtsoe Building, the LeRoy Cowles Building, the Alfred Emery Building, and the James Talmage Building were built on what is now University of Utah circle.

2024 pro-Palestinian encampment

The circle was the site of one of many pro-Palestinian encampments that occurred in response to the Gaza war.

== Buildings ==
The district is composed of the following eight buildings, which are all named after former University of Utah Presidents and located along University Circle:

- Alfred Emery Building (1901) - Designed by Richard K.A. Kletting and named after former university president Alfred C. Emery in 1980. It was originally built to house the normal school.
- John Widtsoe Building (1901) - Designed by Richard K.A. Kletting and named after former university president John A. Widtsoe.
- LeRoy Cowles Building (1901) - Designed by Richard K.A. Kletting and named after former university president LeRoy E. Cowles in 1980. It was originally constructed to house the library. It currently houses the mathematics department at the university. "Extended Vision", a series of etched and screenprinted plates depicting math theories created by artist Anna Campbell Bliss, were installed in the building's lobby between 2001 and 2003.
- James Talmage Building (1902) - Designed by Richard K.A. Kletting and named after the former professor and university president James E. Talmage in 1976. It was originally constructed as a museum.

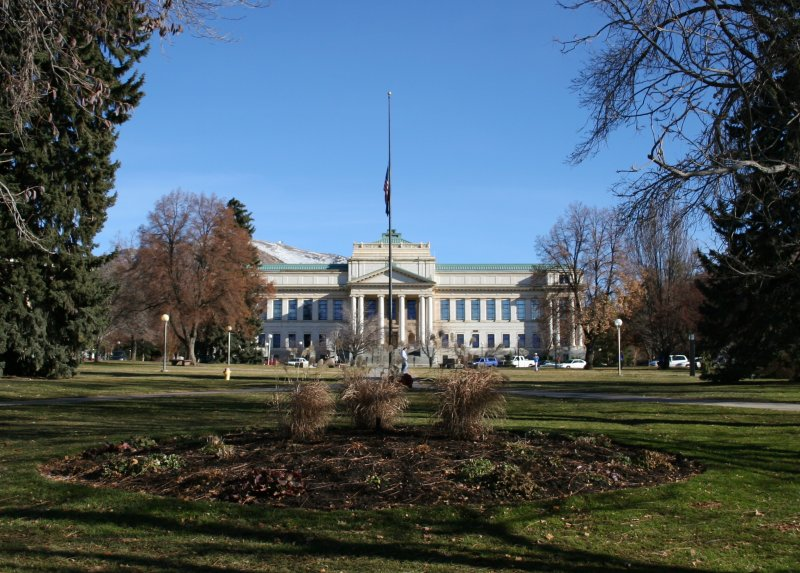
Park Building, December 2005

- Park Building (1914) - Designed by the architectural firm of Cannon, Fetzer, Hansen. Originally named the "Central Building", it was renamed the "Park Building" in 1919 after former university president John R. Park . It currently houses the office of the president and other university administrators.
- Kingsbury Hall (1930) - Designed by Anderson & Young and named after Joseph T. Kingsbury, former president of the university. Many of Utah's performing arts organizations started in Kingsbury Hall including Ballet West and Utah Opera.
- David P. Gardner Hall (1931) - Designed by Ashton & Evans. In 1980 it was named after former university president David P. Gardner. It was originally constructed to be the union building. Today it houses the school of music. A 1997 renovation added several areas to the building, including a concert hall named after Gardner's wife, Libby.
- George Thomas Building (1935) - Designed by Ashton & Evans and named after former university president George Thomas. It was originally built as the George Thomas Library. In 1968 when the library moved and became the J. Willard Marriott Library the building became the home of the Utah Museum of Natural History. In 2011 the "Utah Museum of Natural History" moved to a new building and changed its name to "Natural History Museum of Utah". Since 2016, a program of works has been transforming the George Thomas Building in order to receive the new "Gary and Ann Crocker Science Center":

== Gallery ==
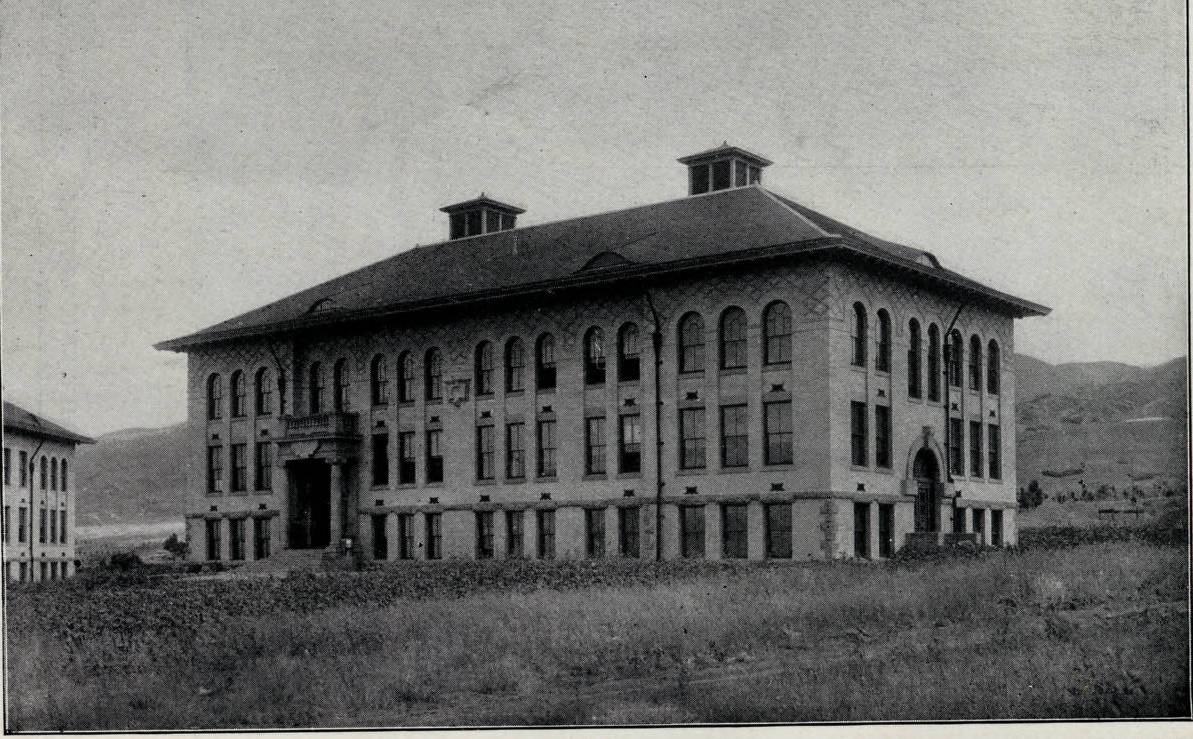
The LeRoy Cowles Building, 1905

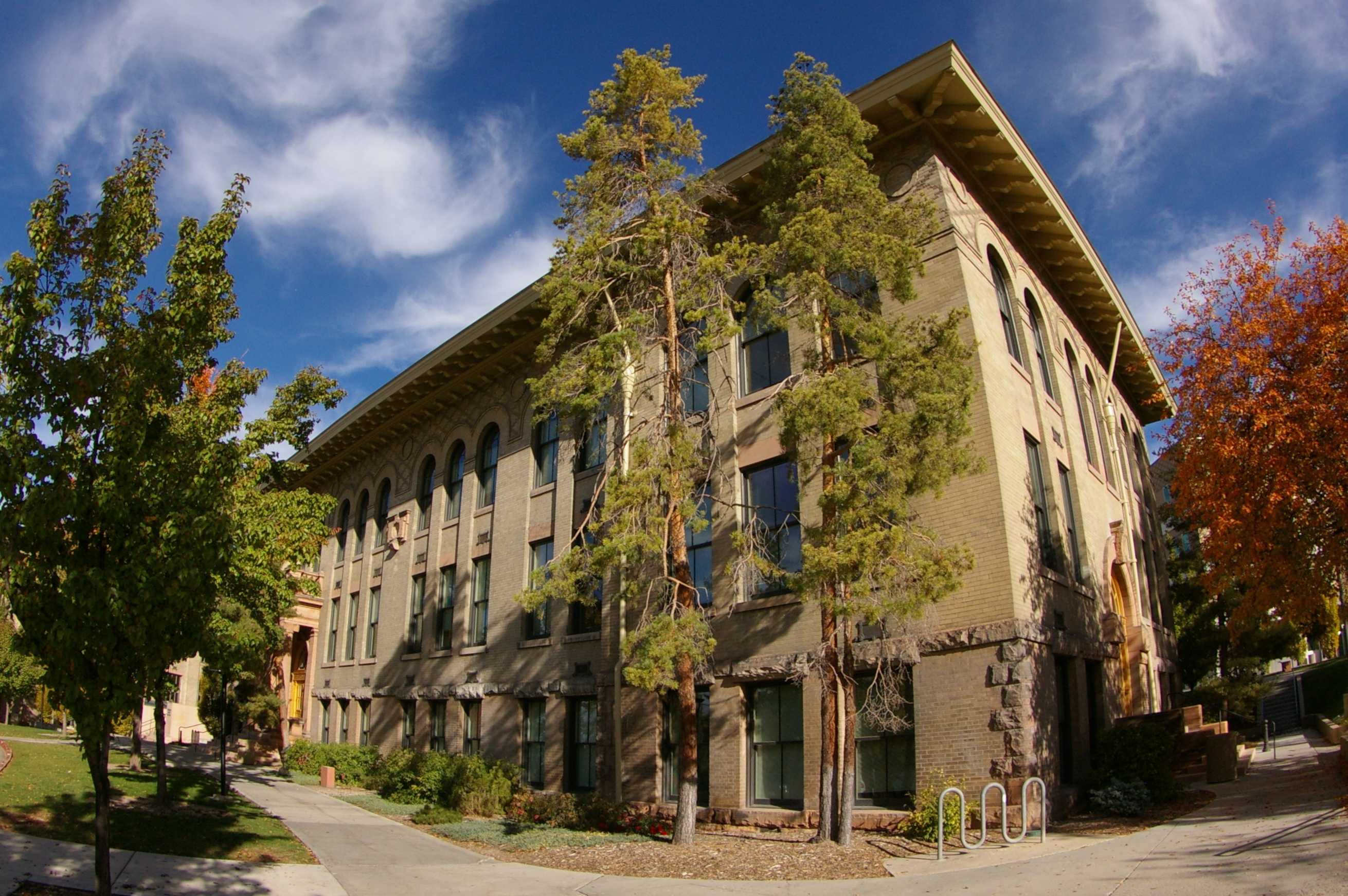
LeRoy Cowles Building, November 2010

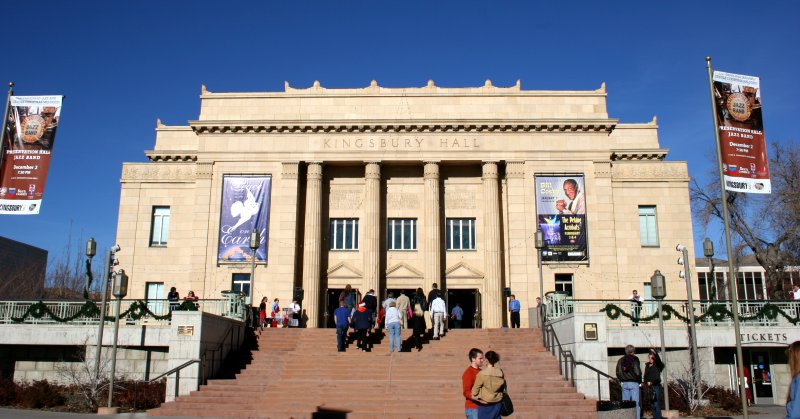
Kingsbury Hall, December 2005

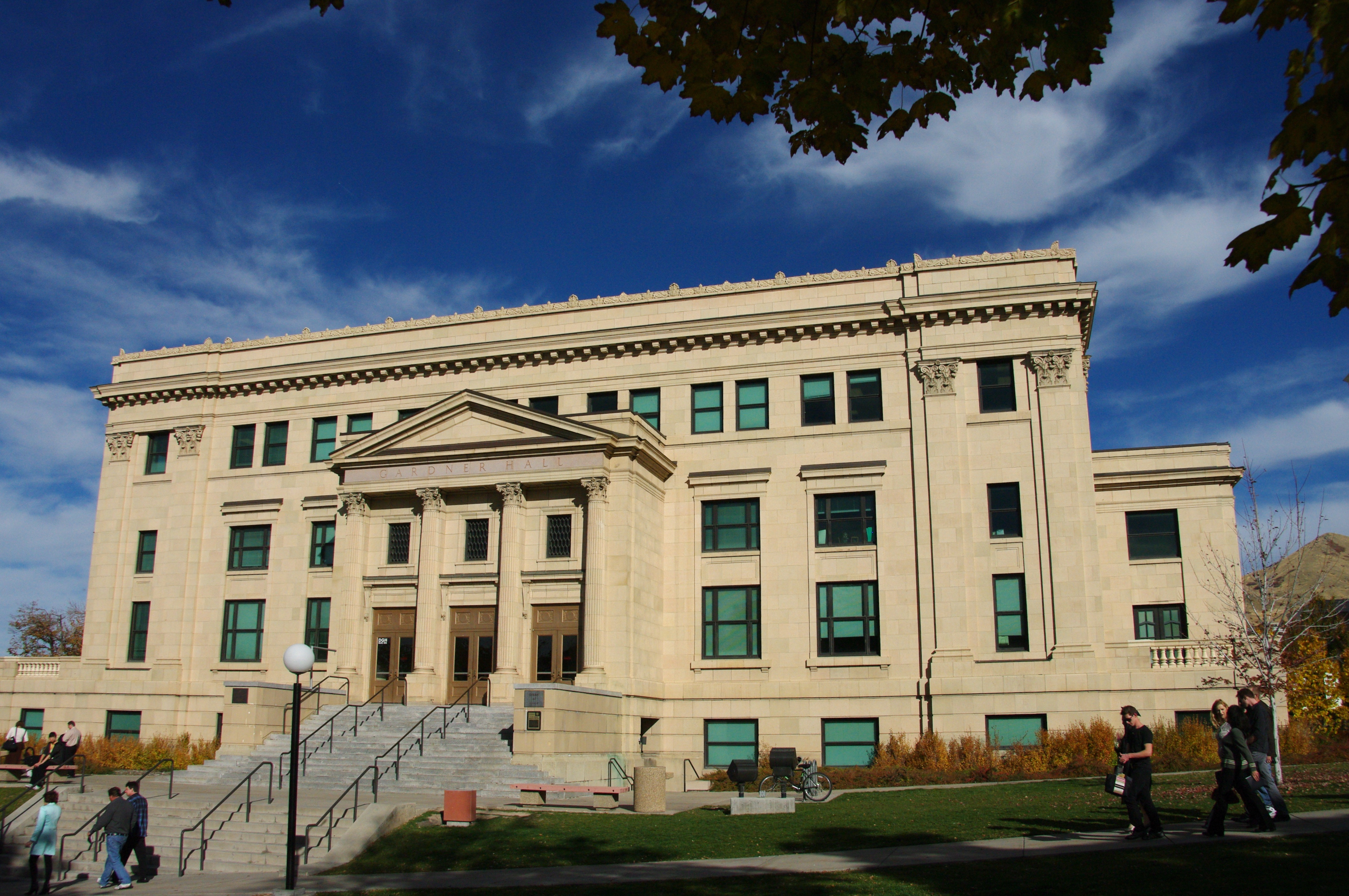
Gardner Hall, November 2010

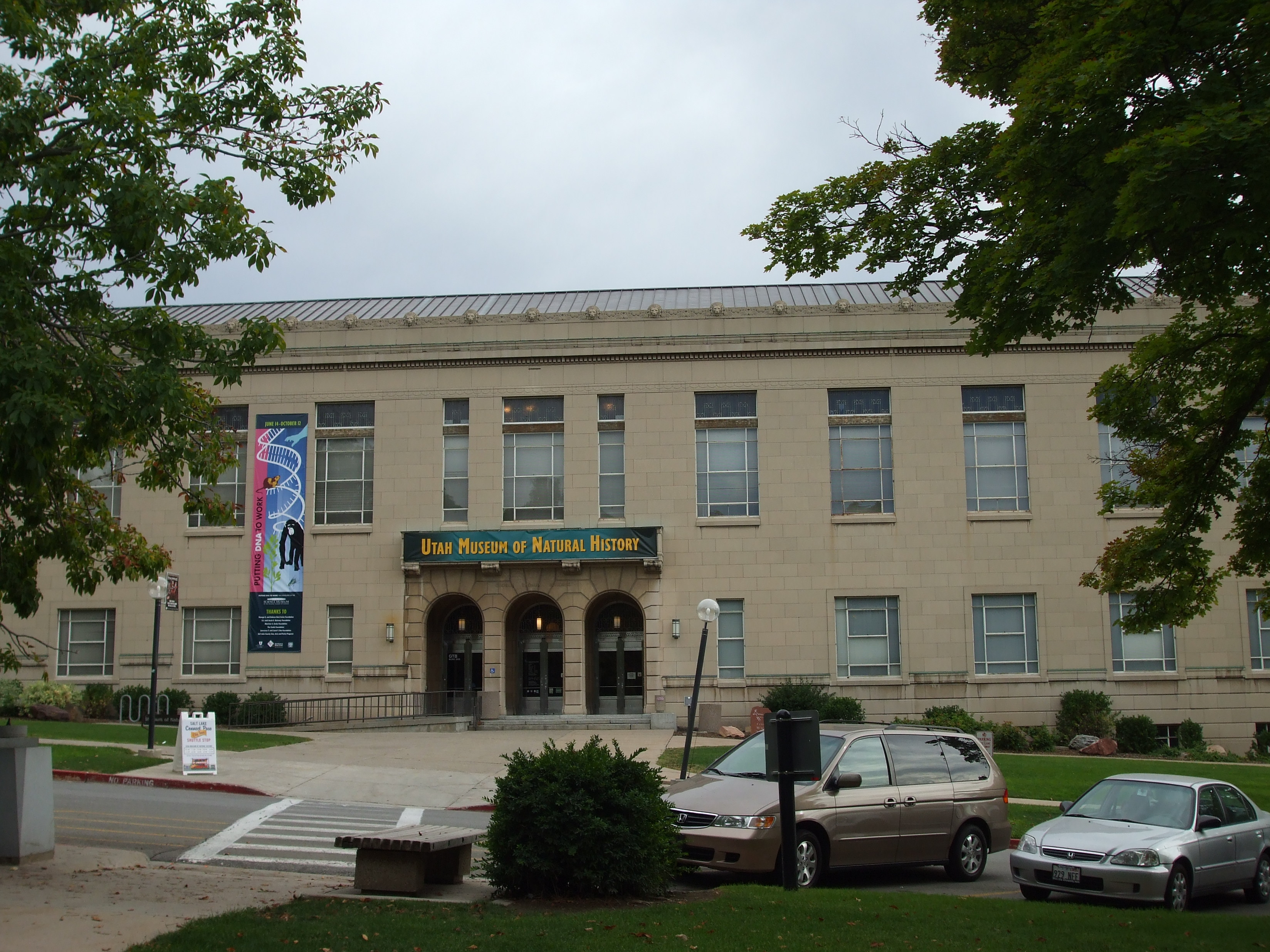
Thomas Building, August 2008

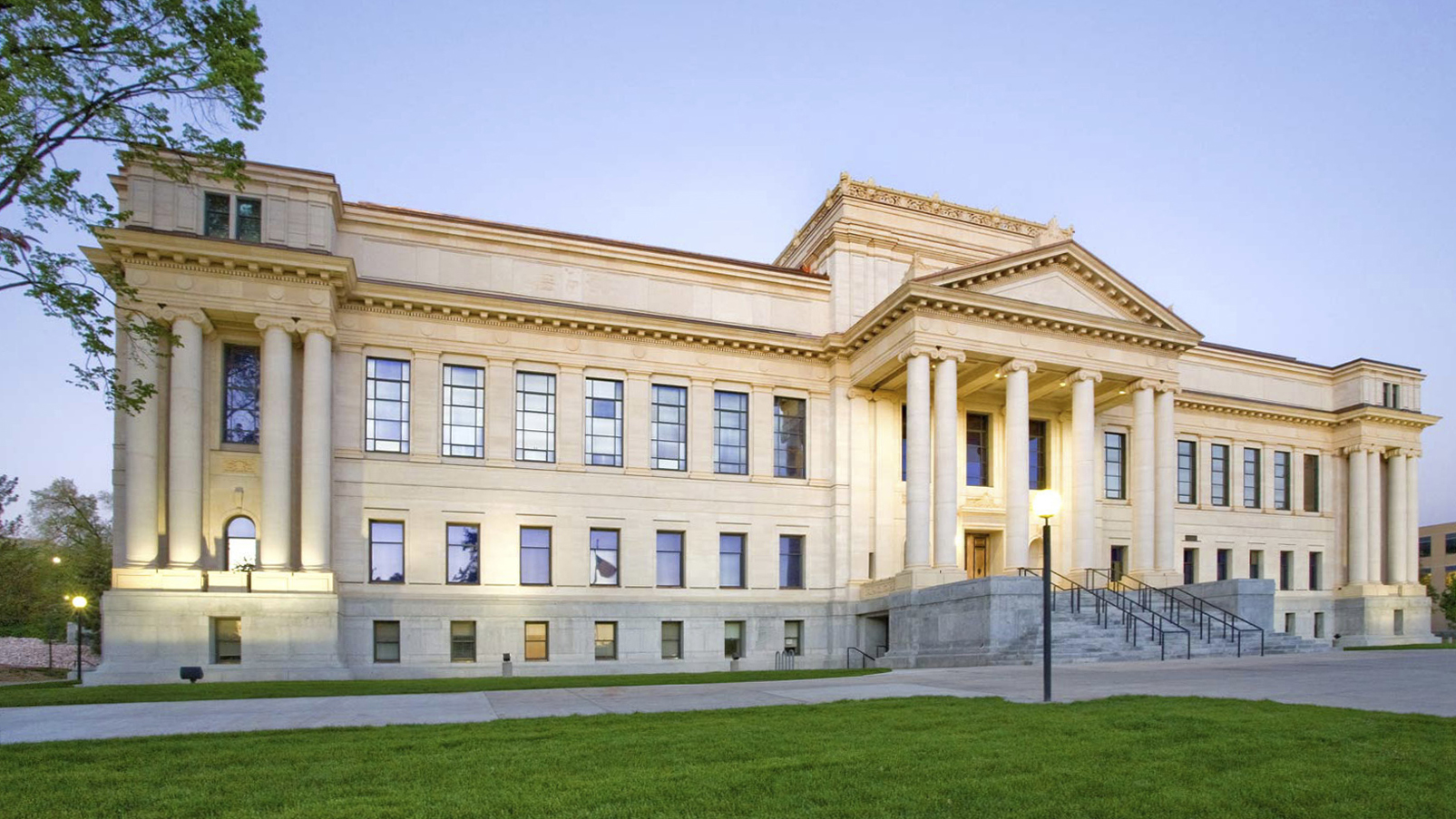
Park Building, December 2009

== See also ==
- National Register of Historic Places listings in Salt Lake City
