= Atwood, Nevada =

Atwood
- Ghost town
- Location in Nevada
- Coordinates: 38°44′53″N 117°51′22″W
- Country: United States
- State: Nevada
- Counties: Nye
- Founded: 1901
- Deserted: 1959
- Elevation: 6,001 ft (1,829 m)

Population
  - Total: 0
- GNIS feature ID: 848496

Atwood is a former mining settlement located 35 miles (56 km) northeast of Mina in Nye County, Nevada. Founded in 1901, it was the most important mining village in the Fairplay Mining District, that was called "Atwood Mining District" as well. After Atwood was totally deserted in 1908, the settlement revived in 1914. The last resident left the mining settlement in 1959. Currently, only one foundation and fragments of glass remain.

Atwood was named after the Atwood Mining District, which was named after its discoverer.

== History ==
=== Initial settlement (1901-1908) ===
Atwood was founded in 1901 following the discovery of gold in the Paradise Range by a group consisting of Okey Davis, George Duncan, E.A. McNaughton, and William Regan. The mining district in which Atwood is situated, Fairplay, was established two years later in June. Gold Crown Mining, the company that operated the Atwood and the Lone Star Mine, was founded in April 1904. The townsite was platted in September of the following year and it was advertised by a real estate firm from Tonopah. In the summer of 1905, a miner said to the Nevada State Journal that Atwood was a "city of tents", but that lumber was brought in, and that the first permanent structures would be built in the fall of 1905. In December of that year, a competing townsite, named Edgewood, was platted nearby. However, Edgewood was abandoned shortly after.

In 1906, the town was sold to the Griggs Atwood Mining Company, that bought the Atwood Mine with it. Due to this acquisition, Atwood turned into a company town. The three main mines of Atwood were Atwood, Butler, and Gold Crown. Of those, the Butler Mine was the most important and had a 280-foot (85-metre) deep shaft. After being mined, the gold ore was brought to Sodaville. Meanwhile, the population had increased, reaching 200 by the end of 1906, and several businesses and amenities had been founded in the town. These included a hotel, several stores, a dance hall, and a post office, that opened on February 6, 1906. When the owner of the hotel became the postmaster shortly after the post office was established, she moved the post office to her hotel. Also, a short-lived newspaper, called the Fairplay Prospector, was published in 1907, a stage line existed between Atwood and Mina, and a basketball team was formed. The basketball team was made up of residents of Atwood and competed against a team from Goldyke on Sundays. Although newspapers predicted a boom in Atwood in 1908, the Butler Mine was closed, and the mining settlement was completely deserted that year. The post office closed down on January 31 of the same year.

=== Revival after 1914: three camps ===
The mining settlement revived in the beginning of 1914, when rich ore had been found by Okey Davis south of Atwood. Four mining companies were active in the Fairplay Mining District in January 1914: the "Nevada Chief Mining Company", the "Nevada Chief Extension Mining Company", the "Contact Mining Company", and the "Excelsior Twilight Mining Company". Miners resided in three different camps: Atwood, Okey Davis, and Butler. Okey Davis was established at the site where the ore was found and had eight structures when it was founded. Butler was erected next to the Butler Mine, that was renamed "Nevada Chief". It was named after M. L. Butler, who had discovered the mine. Butler was organized in February 1915 by Jim Skelton and the first frame house was built subsequently. Its population rose to 75 in March, and a lodging house, a cookhouse, and a lumber yard were established.

However, Butler's population started declining in the summer and reached zero in fall. Butler was renamed "Gilt Edge" in its last months. Moreover, Atwood was abandoned itself afterwards. In 1927, the Oatman United Gold Mining Company, that owned the Okey Davis Mine, acquired the Nevada Chief Mine. The mining came to a halt during the following years, and the last mines closed in the early 1930s. The structures around the mines were still intact around 1950, and the last inhabitant of the Fairplay Mining District, Walter Pfefferkorn, left the Okey Davis camp in 1959.
