= 6th Utah Territorial Legislature =

The 6th Utah Territorial Legislature comprised members of the Territorial Council serving the second year of their terms, together with members of the House of Representatives elected to one-year terms. The regular election for the House was held August 4, 1856.

Three sitting members of the Territorial Council were unavailable to return and were replaced by election: Orson Pratt, John A. Ray, and George A. Smith. In addition, special elections were required for a Council seat when Parley P. Pratt resigned, and to a House seat vacated by the death of Jedediah M. Grant.

== Session ==
The legislative session initially convened on December 8, 1856, at the Territorial Statehouse in Fillmore. Dissatisfied with the unfinished condition of the Statehouse and the failure of Congress to reimburse the territory or to appropriate additional funds for its completion, the legislators quickly passed a resolution changing the seat of government from Fillmore to Salt Lake City. The session then adjourned and was re-convened in Salt Lake City on December 18.

== Members ==
Name	County	Office	Notes
Territorial Council:
Albert Carrington	Salt Lake		
William H. Dame	Iron		Elected October 6, 1856
Lorin Farr	Weber		
William Felshaw	Millard		Elected August 4, 1856
Leonard E. Harrington	Utah		
Benjamin F. Johnson	Utah		
Heber C. Kimball	Salt Lake	President	
Isaac Morley	San Pete		
Parley P. Pratt	Salt Lake		Elected August 4, 1856, resigned prior to session
Franklin D. Richards	Salt Lake		Elected October 6, 1856
Lorenzo Snow	Box Elder		
John Stoker	Davis		
Daniel H. Wells	Salt Lake		
Wilford Woodruff	Salt Lake		
Territorial House of Representatives:
Noah W. Bartholomew	Millard		
Jacob G. Bigler	Juab		
Isaac Bullock	Green River		
Hiram B. Clawson	Salt Lake		
James W. Cummings	Salt Lake		
David Evans	Utah		
Jedediah M. Grant	Salt Lake		Died December 1, 1856
Thomas Grover	Davis		
Isaac C. Haight	Iron		
Orson Hyde	Salt Lake		Elected December 20, 1856
Aaron Johnson	Utah		
James Lewis	Iron		
Jesse C. Little	Salt Lake		
Peter Maughan	Tooele		
Alexander McRae	Salt Lake		
John D. Parker	Davis		
George Peacock	San Pete		
William W. Phelps	Salt Lake		
Enoch Reese	Carson		
Samuel W. Richards	Salt Lake		
Albert P. Rockwood	Salt Lake		
James C. Snow	Utah		
Daniel Spencer	Salt Lake		
Hosea Stout	Salt Lake	Speaker	
Chauncey W. West	Weber		
Jonathan C. Wright	Box Elder		
Joseph A. Young	Salt Lake		
