= 4th Utah Territorial Legislature =

The 4th Utah Territorial Legislature comprised members of the Territorial Council serving the second year of their terms, together with members of the House of Representatives elected to one-year terms. The regular election for the House was held August 7, 1854. Several vacancies in Territorial Council were also filled at that time due to the death of Willard Richards and the resignations of Parley P. Pratt and John Taylor.

== Session ==
The legislative session convened on December 11, 1854, at the Council House in Salt Lake City, and ended on January 19, 1855.

== Members ==
Name	County	Office	Notes
Territorial Council:
Erastus Bingham	Weber		
Albert Carrington	Salt Lake		Elected August 7, 1854
Lorin Farr	Weber		
Leonard E. Harrington	Utah		
Aaron Johnson	Utah		
Heber C. Kimball	Salt Lake	President	
Isaac Morley	San Pete		
Orson Pratt	Salt Lake		Elected August 7, 1854
John A. Ray	Millard		
George A. Smith	Iron		
Thomas S. Smith	Davis		
Daniel H. Wells	Salt Lake		
Wilford Woodruff	Salt Lake		Elected August 7, 1854
Territorial House of Representatives:
Ezra T. Benson	Tooele		
James Brown	Weber		
John Carling	Millard		
James W. Cummings	Salt Lake		
William H. Dame	Iron		
Thomas Dunn	Weber		
Horace S. Eldredge	Salt Lake		
Timothy B. Foote	Juab		
Jedediah M. Grant	Salt Lake	Speaker	
Evan M. Greene	Utah		
Thomas Grover	Davis		
Richard Harrison	Iron		
Chester Loveland	Davis		
Duncan McArthur	Utah		
John Nebeker	Green River		
George Peacock	San Pete		
William W. Phelps	Salt Lake		
Samuel W. Richards	Salt Lake		
Albert P. Rockwood	Salt Lake		
John L. Smith	Iron		
James C. Snow	Utah		
Lorenzo Snow	Salt Lake		
Hosea Stout	Salt Lake		
Edwin D. Woolley	Salt Lake		
Jonathan C. Wright	Weber		
Joseph Young	Salt Lake		

The composition of the Salt Lake County House delegation is murky, as the county had 11 seats to fill but returned a ticket with only 10 names (Joseph Young was not on the ticket). However, when the legislative session opened on December 11, Young was included in the delegation but Edwin D. Woolley was not reported as present. It is not clear whether Young in fact replaced Woolley (in which case the House would have been functioning with only 25 members instead of the usual 26), or if each was elected to their own seat.
