= List of general authorities (LDS Church) =

The following individuals are the current general authorities of the Church of Jesus Christ of Latter-day Saints. Individual hierarchical positions and some of current specialized assignments in the church, if any, are listed.

== General authorities ==
=== First Presidency ===
Picture (PNG/JPG)	Name	Hierarchical position	Ordained and/or Set Apart	Age	Tithe^{[a]}	CES Board^{[b]}
	Dallin H. Oaks	President	2025-10-14	94.3	Member	Chairman
	Henry B. Eyring	First Counselor President of the Quorum of the Twelve Apostles	2025-10-14 2025-12-27	93.4	Member	First Vice Chairman
	D. Todd Christofferson	Second Counselor	2025-10-14	81.8	Member	Second Vice Chairman

- ^{a} Council on the Disposition of the Tithes
- ^{b} Boards of Trustees/Education of the Church Educational System (CES)

=== Quorum of the Twelve Apostles ===
Picture (PNG/JPG)	Name	Hierarchical position	Ordained	Age	Tithe^{[a]}	Area ^{[b]}	Other assignments ^{[c]}
	Dieter F. Uchtdorf	Acting President of the Quorum of the Twelve Apostles	2004-10-07 2026-01-08	86	Member		
	David A. Bednar	Quorum of the Twelve Apostles	2004-10-07	74.4	Member	Middle East/Africa North	Chair, Correlation Executive Committee; Apostolic Adviser, Church History Department
	Quentin L. Cook	Quorum of the Twelve Apostles	2007-10-11	86.2	Member		Chair, Temple and Family History Executive Council
	Neil L. Andersen	Quorum of the Twelve Apostles	2009-04-09	75.3	Member		
	Ronald A. Rasband	Quorum of the Twelve Apostles	2015-10-08	75.8	Member		Chair, Missionary Executive Council
	Gary E. Stevenson	Quorum of the Twelve Apostles	2015-10-08	71.3	Member		
	Dale G. Renlund	Quorum of the Twelve Apostles	2015-10-08	74	Member		Member, Missionary Executive Council; Member, Church Board of Education/Boards of Trustees; Chairman, CES Executive Committee; Chairman, Church Hymnbook Revision Committee; Chairman, Church Scriptures Committee
	Gerrit W. Gong	Quorum of the Twelve Apostles	2018-04-05	72.8	Member	Asia & Asia North	Member, Leadership and Training Committee; Member, Outreach Committee; Apostolic Adviser, Church History Department; Member, Church Board of Education/Boards of Trustees; Member, CES Executive Committee
	Ulisses Soares	Quorum of the Twelve Apostles	2018-04-05	68.1	Member	Caribbean and Pacific	Member, Temple and Family History Executive Council
	Patrick Kearon	Quorum of the Twelve Apostles	2023-12-07	65.3	Member		
	Gérald Caussé	Quorum of the Twelve Apostles	2025-11-06	63.4	Member		Member, Temple and Family History Executive Council
	Clark G. Gilbert	Quorum of the Twelve Apostles	2026-02-12	56.4	Member		Member, Missionary Executive Council

- ^{a} Council on the Disposition of the Tithes
- ^{b} Area assignment
- ^{c} Other assignments, where known (including committees, councils, Church Educational System, etc.

=== Presiding Bishopric ===
Name	Hierarchical position	Age	Years served as General Authority^{[a]}	Years served in Presiding Bishopric^{[b]}	Years served in current assignment^{[c]}	Tithe^{[d]}	Other assignments^{[e]}
W. Christopher Waddell	Presiding Bishop	67.3	15.6	11.1	1	Member	Member, Priesthood and Family Executive Council; Member, Church Board of Education/Boards of Trustees
L. Todd Budge	First Counselor, Presiding Bishopric	66.8	7.6	6.1	1	Member	Member, Temple and Family History Executive Council
Sean Douglas	Second Counselor, Presiding Bishopric	62.5	5.6	1	1	Member	Member, Missionary Executive Council

- ^{a} Total years as General Authority
- ^{b} Total years in Presiding Bishopric
- ^{c} Total years served in current Presiding Bishopric
- ^{d} Council on the Disposition of the Tithes
- ^{e} Other assignments (where known)

=== Presidency of the Seventy ===
Name	Hierarchical position	Called^{[a]}	Age	Years served^{[b]}	Years in Presidency	Other assignments^{[c]}
Carl B. Cook	Senior President, Presidency	2011-04-02*; 2018-03-31	69.1	15.6	8.6	
Marcus B. Nash	Presidency	2006-04-01; 2024-01-17	69.6	20.6	2.8	
Michael T. Ringwood	Presidency	2009-04-04; 2024-08-01	68.8	17.6	2.3	Africa West, Europe North, and United States Central Areas; Member, Missionary Executive Council; Member, Church Board of Education and Boards of Trustees; Member, Executive Committee of the Board
Arnulfo Valenzuela	Presidency	2013-04-06; 2024-08-01	67.5	13.6	2.3	Brazil, Central America, South America South, and United States Northeast Areas
Edward Dube	Presidency	2013-04-06; 2024-08-01	64.5	13.6	2.3	Caribbean, United States Southeast, and United States Southwest Areas
Kevin R. Duncan	Presidency	2010-04-03*; 2025-08-01	66.1	16.6	1.3	
Benjamin M. Z. Tai	Presidency	2019-04-06*; 2026-08-01	54.4	7.6	0.3	

- ^{a} Date called to be a seventy and the date called as a member of the Presidency of the Seventy
- ^{b} Years served as a general authority seventy
- ^{c} Other assignments, including Church Educational System (CES) assignments, where known.

=== General Authority Seventies ===
Those listed in this section are members of the First or Second Quorum of the Seventy. While each is assigned to a specific quorum, that affiliation is no longer being made public, with all General Authority Seventies being referred to with that generic designation.. Beginning in 2026, area presidencies will have either 3 or 4 members as designated by the First Presidency, and the specific designation of counselors has been discontinued.

Name	Hierarchical position	Sustained^{[a]}	Age	Years served	Assignment^{[b]}
Marcos A. Aidukaitis	General Authority Seventy	2008-04-05	67.2	18.6	Europe North Area Presidency
Rubén V. Alliaud	General Authority Seventy	2019-04-06	60.8	7.6	
José L. Alonso	General Authority Seventy	2011-04-02	68	15.6	Mexico Area Presidency
Jorge M. Alvarado	General Authority Seventy	2019-04-06	55.9	7.6	Mexico Area Presidency
John D. Amos	General Authority Seventy	2025-04-05	65	1.6	United States Southeast Area Presidency
Steven R. Bangerter	General Authority Seventy	2018-03-31	65.3	8.6	Executive Director, Temple Department
Ronald M. Barcellos	General Authority Seventy	2025-04-05	51	1.6	Brazil Area Presidency
Steven C. Barlow	General Authority Seventy	2025-04-05	57.8	1.6	South America Northwest Area Presidency
Jorge T. Becerra	General Authority Seventy	2020-04-04*	63.9	6.6	Utah Area Presidency
Hans T. Boom	General Authority Seventy	2019-04-06	63.3	7.6	Pacific Area Presidency
Mark A. Bragg	General Authority Seventy	2016-04-02	64.6	10.6	Executive Director, Family History Department
Kevin G. Brown	General Authority Seventy	2025-04-05	50.5	1.6	
David L. Buckner	General Authority Seventy	2024-04-06	63.1	2.6	Asia Area Presidency
Matthew L. Carpenter	General Authority Seventy	2018-03-31	67	8.6	Canada Area Presidency
Gregorio E. Casillas	General Authority Seventy	2024-04-06	51.2	2.6	Central America Area Presidency
Aroldo B. Cavalcante	General Authority Seventy	2024-04-06	55.9	2.6	United States Southeast Area Presidency
Christian C. Chigbundu	General Authority Seventy	2026-04-04	52	0.6	Africa West Area Presidency
Yoon Hwan Choi	General Authority Seventy	2009-04-04*	69.5	17.6	Assistant Editor, the Liahona magazine
Ahmad S. Corbitt	General Authority Seventy	2023-04-01	64.3	3.6	Caribbean Area Presidency
Valeri V. Cordon	General Authority Seventy	2016-04-02	57.7	10.6	Caribbean Area President
Joaquin E. Costa	General Authority Seventy	2016-04-02	61.7	10.6	United States Southwest Area Presidency
B. Corey Cuvelier	General Authority Seventy	2025-04-05	57.8	1.6	Brazil Area Presidency
Michael Cziesla	General Authority Seventy	2025-04-05	54.3	1.6	Europe Central Area Presidency
Robert M. Daines	General Authority Seventy	2023-04-01	62.3	3.6	President, United States Northeast Area; Editor, The Liahona, For the Strength of Youth, and The Friend magazines.
Massimo De Feo	General Authority Seventy	2016-04-02	65.9	10.6	United States Southeast Area President
Michael A. Dunn	General Authority Seventy	2021-04-03	68.7	5.6	United States Southwest Area President
Alexander Dushku	General Authority Seventy	2023-08-15	60	3.3	Church General Counsel
Mark D. Eddy	General Authority Seventy	2022-04-02	53.6	4.6	
I. Raymond Egbo	General Authority Seventy	2024-04-06	52.3	2.6	
J. Kimo Esplin	General Authority Seventy	2023-04-01	64.3	3.6	Asia North Area President
James E. Evanson	General Authority Seventy	2025-04-05	58.3	1.6	Canada Area Presidency
Brik V. Eyre	General Authority Seventy	2025-04-05	62.8	1.6	Mexico Area Presidency
Matthew J. Eyring	General Authority Seventy	2026-04-04	57.3	0.6	Pacific Area Presidency
Hutch U. Fale	General Authority Seventy	2026-04-04	47.2	0.6	United States West Area Presidency
James O. Fantone	General Authority Seventy	2026-04-04	54.8	0.6	United States Central Area Presidency
Ozani Farias	General Authority Seventy	2025-04-05	57	1.6	Africa South Area Presidency
Jack N. Gerard	General Authority Seventy	2018-03-31	68.9	8.6	Europe Central Area President
Ricardo P. Giménez	General Authority Seventy	2019-04-06	54.9	7.6	United States Central Area Presidency
Christophe G. Giraud-Carrier	General Authority Seventy	2023-04-01	60.8	3.6	Africa Central Area Presidency
Patricio M. Giuffra	General Authority Seventy	2021-04-03	64.6	5.6	Central America Area President
Carlos A. Godoy	General Authority Seventy	2008-04-05*	65.8	18.6	Africa South Area President
Taylor G. Godoy	General Authority Seventy	2017-04-01	58.3	9.6	
D. Martin Goury	General Authority Seventy	2024-04-06	62.8	2.6	Africa West Area Presidency
Aaron T. Hall	General Authority Seventy	2025-04-05	55.7	1.6	
Kevin J. Hathaway	General Authority Seventy	2026-04-04	51.7	0.6	United States Northeast Area Presidency
Allen D. Haynie	General Authority Seventy	2015-04-04	68.2	11.6	
Mathias Held	General Authority Seventy	2018-03-31	66.4	8.6	South America South Area Presidency
Karl D. Hirst	General Authority Seventy	2024-04-06	54.7	2.6	United States Central Area Presidency
Matthew S. Holland	General Authority Seventy	2020-04-04	60.4	6.6	Executive Director, Communications Department
Brian J. Holmes	General Authority Seventy	2025-04-05	48.9	1.6	
David P. Homer	General Authority Seventy	2018-03-31	65.5	8.6	Executive Director, Priesthood and Family Department; Adviser, The Liahona, For the Strength of Youth, and The Friend magazines.
Jeremy R. Jaggi	General Authority Seventy	2020-04-04*	53.6	6.6	Pacific Area Presidency
Kelly R. Johnson	General Authority Seventy	2020-04-04*	63.8	6.6	Asia Area President
Peter M. Johnson	General Authority Seventy	2019-04-06	59.9	7.6	United States West Area Presidency
Christopher H. Kim	General Authority Seventy	2024-04-06	61	2.6	Asia North Area Presidency
Jörg Klebingat	General Authority Seventy	2014-04-05	58.8	12.6	Adviser, The Liahona; Assistant Editor, For the Strength of Youth
Joni L. Koch	General Authority Seventy	2017-04-01	64.6	9.6	United States Northeast Area
Alfred Kyungu	General Authority Seventy	2021-04-03	60	5.6	Africa Central Area Presidency
Pedro X. Larreal	General Authority Seventy	2025-04-05	50.3	1.6	United States Southwest Area Presidency
Thabo Lebetha	General Authority Seventy	2026-04-04	51.2	0.6	Utah Area Presidency
Hugo E. Martinez	General Authority Seventy	2014-04-05	69.8	12.6	United States West Area Presidency
Clement M. Matswagothata	General Authority Seventy	2025-04-05	46.8	1.6	
James W. McConkie III	General Authority Seventy	2022-04-02	55.2	4.6	Europe Central Area Presidency
John A. McCune	General Authority Seventy	2019-04-06	63.3	7.6	Utah Area Presidency
Kyle S. McKay	General Authority Seventy	2018-03-31	66.8	8.6	Church Historian and Recorder; Executive Director, Church History Department; Member, Church Music Revision Committee
Alvin F. Meredith III	General Authority Seventy	2021-04-03	56.3	5.6	President, BYU-Idaho
Hugo Montoya	General Authority Seventy	2015-04-04	66.6	11.6	Caribbean Area Presidency
Jeremiah J. Morgan	General Authority Seventy	2026-04-04	55.7	0.6	
Isaac K. Morrison	General Authority Seventy	2022-04-02	48.9	4.6	Africa West Area Presidency
Thierry K. Mutombo	General Authority Seventy	2020-04-04	50.8	6.6	
K. Brett Nattress	General Authority Seventy	2016-04-02	61.7	10.6	
Adeyinka A. Ojediran	General Authority Seventy	2020-04-04	59.6	6.6	Africa West Area President
Ryan K. Olsen	General Authority Seventy	2022-04-02	52.1	4.6	Central America Area Presidency
Eduardo F. Ortega	General Authority Seventy	2025-04-05	49.3	1.6	
Adilson de Paula Parrella	General Authority Seventy	2017-04-01	64	9.6	Middle East/Africa North Area Presidency
Kevin W. Pearson	General Authority Seventy	2008-04-05	69.6	18.6	Europe North Area President
Anthony D. Perkins	General Authority Seventy	2006-04-01	66.3	20.6	Middle East/Africa North Area President; Member, Area Committee; Member, Outreach Committee; Member, International Coordinating Committee
Alan T. Phillips	General Authority Seventy	2023-04-01	56.3	3.6	United States Northeast Area Presidency
Paul B. Pieper	General Authority Seventy	2005-04-02	69.1	21.6	Africa Central Area President
John C. Pingree Jr.	General Authority Seventy	2017-04-01	60.3	9.6	Executive Director, Correlation Department
James R. Rasband	General Authority Seventy	2019-04-06	63.6	7.6	Commissioner of Church Education
Carlos G. Revillo Jr.	General Authority Seventy	2021-04-03	61	5.6	Philippines Area President
Sandino Roman	General Authority Seventy	2024-04-06	53.3	2.6	South America Northwest Area Presidency
Edward B. Rowe	General Authority Seventy	2025-04-05	59.5	1.6	Middle East/Africa North Area Presidency
Ciro Schmeil	General Authority Seventy	2020-04-04	55.6	6.6	Brazil Area President
Jonathan S. Schmitt	General Authority Seventy	2022-04-02	53.6	4.6	Executive Director, Missionary Department
Steven D. Shumway	General Authority Seventy	2024-04-06	56.3	2.6	Philippines Area Presidency
Vai Sikahema	General Authority Seventy	2021-04-03	64.2	5.6	Africa South Area Presidency
Denelson Silva	General Authority Seventy	2022-04-02	61.3	4.6	Brazil Area Presidency
Paul H. Sinclair	General Authority Seventy	2026-04-04	60.6	0.6	Europe North Area Presidency
Vern P. Stanfill	General Authority Seventy	2015-04-04	69.3	11.6	Canada Area President
Michael B. Strong	General Authority Seventy	2024-04-06	61.3	2.6	
Brian K. Taylor	General Authority Seventy	2017-04-01	62.6	9.6	Utah Area President
Michael John U. Teh	General Authority Seventy	2007-03-31	61.3	19.6	Asia North Area Presidency
Jose A. Teixeira	General Authority Seventy	2008-04-05	65.8	18.6	United States Central Area President
Sergio R. Vargas	General Authority Seventy	2024-04-06	50	2.6	South America South Area Presidency
Moisés Villanueva	General Authority Seventy	2020-04-04*	59.9	6.6	Mexico Area President
Juan Pablo Villar	General Authority Seventy	2018-03-31	57.2	8.6	South America Northwest Area President
Takashi Wada	General Authority Seventy	2018-03-31	61.8	8.6	United States West Area President
Taniela B. Wakolo	General Authority Seventy	2017-04-01	59.3	9.6	Pacific Area President
Alan R. Walker	General Authority Seventy	2019-04-06	55.8	7.6	South America South Area President
Scott D. Whiting	General Authority Seventy	2012-03-31	65.6	14.6	Assistant Executive Director, Family History Department
Chi Hong (Sam) Wong	General Authority Seventy	2014-04-05	64.4	12.6	Philippines Area Presidency
Wan-Liang Wu	General Authority Seventy	2025-04-05	55.8	1.6	Asia Area Presidency

- ^{a1} ^{a2} Date first sustained to First or Second Quorum of Seventy or called to be General Authority Seventies (where Quorum affiliation is not known). Dates taken from lds.org.
  Those marked with * were Area Seventies prior to call as General Authorities.
- ^{b1} Current assignments.

=== Emeritus ===
Emeritus General Authorities are General Authorities who have been released from their positions in the hierarchy. They remain General Authorities until their deaths. All current emeritus General Authorities are former members of the First and Second Quorums of the Seventies or of the Presiding Bishopric.

When the first General Authorities were given emeritus status, N. Eldon Tanner of the First Presidency provided the following explanation:

"The very rapid growth of the Church across the world, with the attendant increase in travel and responsibility, has made it necessary to consider a change in the status for some of the Brethren of the General Authorities. Some of our associates have served for many years with complete and unselfish dedication, and they deserve every honor and recognition for such devoted service. It is felt advisable at this time to reduce somewhat the load of responsibility that they carry.
"After a long period of prayerful consideration and counsel, extending, indeed, over several years, we announce a new and specific status to be given from time to time to Brethren of our associates in the General Authorities. We announce that some Brethren have been designated as emeritus members of the First Quorum of the Seventy. These Brethren are not being released but will be excused from active service. It is out of consideration for the personal well-being of the individuals, and with deep appreciation for their devoted service, that this designation will be given from time to time to designated members of the General Authorities."

Name	Called ^{[a]}	Emeritus ^{[b]}	Age	Years as Active G.A.^{[c]}	Years as Emeritus G.A.
Carlos H. Amado	1989-04-01	2014-10-04	82.1	25.5	12.1
Wilford W. Andersen	2009-04-04	2019-10-05	77.2	10.5	7.1
Ian S. Ardern	2011-04-02	2024-08-01	72.7	13.3	2.3
Mervyn B. Arnold	2003-04-05	2018-10-06	78.3	15.5	8.1
Ben B. Banks	1989-04-01	2002-10-05	94.6	13.5	24.1
Merrill J. Bateman	1992-06-06	2007-10-06	90.3	15.3	19.1
Randall K. Bennett	2011-04-02	2025-08-01	71.4	14.3	1.3
Shayne M. Bowen	2006-04-01	2024-08-01	72.2	18.3	2.3
H. David Burton	2006-04-01	2012-03-31	88.5	19.5	14.6
Craig A. Cardon	2006-04-01	2018-10-06	77.8	12.5	8.1
Bruce A. Carlson	2009-04-04	2015-10-03	77.1	6.5	11.1
John K. Carmack	1984-04-07	2001-10-06	95.5	17.5	25.1
Sheldon F. Child	1996-04-06	2008-10-04	88.5	12.5	18.1
Craig C.Christensen	2002-10-05	2026-08-01	70.7	23.8	0.3
Kim B. Clark	2015-04-04	2019-10-05	77.6	4.5	7.1
Don R. Clarke	2006-04-01	2015-10-03	80.9	9.5	11.1
L. Whitney Clayton	2001-03-31	2020-10-03	76.7	19.5	6.1
Weatherford T. Clayton	2016-04-02	2022-10-01	74.7	6.5	4.1
Gary J. Coleman	1992-06-06	2011-10-01	85.2	19	15.1
Spencer J. Condie	1989-04-01	2010-10-02	86.2	21.5	16.1
Lawrence E. Corbridge	2008-04-05	2019-10-05	77.6	11.5	7.1
J. Devn Cornish	2011-04-02	2021-10-02	75.6	10.5	5.1
Claudio R. M. Costa	1994-04-02	2019-10-05	77.6	25.5	7.1
LeGrand R. Curtis Jr.	2011-04-02	2022-10-01	74.3	11.5	4.1
Benjamin De Hoyos	2005-04-02	2023-08-01	73.7	18.3	3.3
Robert K. Dellenbach	1990-03-31	2007-10-06	89.5	17.5	19.1
John B. Dickson	1992-10-03	2013-10-05	83.3	21	13.1
Charles Didier	1975-10-03	2009-10-03	91.1	34	17.1
Timothy J. Dyches	2013-04-06	2021-10-02	75.8	8.5	5.1
Larry J. Echo Hawk	2012-03-31	2018-10-06	78.3	6.5	8.1
Stanley G. Ellis	2006-04-01	2017-09-30	79.8	11.5	9.1
David F. Evans	2005-04-02	2021-10-02	75.3	16.5	5.1
Enrique R. Falabella	2007-03-31	2020-10-03	76.5	13.5	6.1
Bradley D. Foster	2009-04-04	2019-10-05	77.7	10.5	7.1
Randy D. Funk	2013-04-06	2022-10-01	74.3	9.5	4.1
Eduardo Gavarret	2002-10-05	2026-08-01	70.5	18.3	0.3
Robert C. Gay	2012-03-31	2021-10-02	75.2	9.5	5.1
Christoffel Golden Jr.	2001-03-31	2022-10-01	74.4	21.5	4.1
Walter F. González	2001-03-31	2022-10-01	74.1	21.5	4.1
John H. Groberg	1976-04-03	2005-10-01	92.4	29.5	21.1
C. Scott Grow	2005-04-02	2018-10-06	78.5	13.5	8.1
Bruce C. Hafen	1996-04-06	2010-10-02	86	14.5	16.1
O. Vincent Haleck	2011-04-02	2019-10-05	77.8	8.5	7.1
Brook P. Hales	2018-05-15	2026-08-01	70.6	8.3	0.3
Donald L. Hallstrom	2000-04-01	2019-10-05	77.3	19.5	7.1
Kevin S. Hamilton	2013-04-06	2025-08-01	71.6	12.3	1.3
F. Melvin Hammond	1989-04-01	2005-10-01	92.8	16.5	21.1
Richard G. Hinckley	2005-04-02	2011-10-01	85.5	6.5	15.1
F. Burton Howard	1978-09-30	2005-10-01	93.6	27	21.1
William K. Jackson	2020-04-04	2026-08-01	70.6	6.3	0.3
Jay E. Jensen	1992-06-06	2012-10-06	84.8	20.3	14.1
Marlin K. Jensen	1989-04-01	2012-10-06	84.5	23.5	14.1
Daniel L. Johnson	2006-04-01	2016-10-01	79.9	10.5	10.1
Kenneth Johnson	1990-03-31	2010-10-02	86.3	20.5	16.1
Paul V. Johnson	2005-04-02	2024-08-01	72.3	19.3	2.3
Larry S. Kacher	2014-04-05	2022-10-01	74.8	8.5	4.1
W. Rolfe Kerr	1996-04-06	2007-10-06	91.3	11.5	19.1
Yoshihiko Kikuchi	1977-10-01	2011-10-01	85.2	34	15.1
Cree-L Kofford	1991-04-06	2003-10-04	93.3	12.5	23.1
Erich W. Kopsichke	2007-03-31	2026-08-01	70	19.3	0.3
Larry R. Lawrence	2010-04-03	2017-09-30	79.2	7.5	9.1
John M. Madsen	1992-06-06	2009-10-03	87.5	17.3	17.1
James B. Martino	2009-04-04	2021-10-02	75.6	12.5	5.1
Richard J. Maynes	1997-04-05	2020-10-03	76	23.5	6.1
Jairo Mazzagardi	2010-04-03	2016-10-01	79.6	6.5	10.1
Keith B. McMullin	1995-12-27	2012-03-31	85.3	16.3	14.6
Peter F. Meurs	2016-04-02	2026-08-01	69.8	10.3	0.3
Lynn A. Mickelsen	1990-03-31	2009-10-03	91.3	19.5	17.1
Dennis B. Neuenschwander	1991-04-06	2009-10-03	87.1	18.5	17.1
S. Gifford Nielsen	2013-04-06	2024-08-01	72	11.3	2.3
Brent H. Nielson	2009-04-04	2024-08-01	71.9	15.3	2.3
Adrian Ochoa	2013-04-06	2024-08-01	72.7	11.3	2.3
Allan F. Packer	2008-04-05	2018-10-06	78.3	10.5	8.1
S. Mark Palmer	2016-04-02	2026-08-01	70.8	10.3	0.3
Rafael E. Pino	2008-04-05	2025-08-01	71	17.3	1.3
Carl B. Pratt	1997-04-05	2011-10-01	85.2	14.5	15.1
Kent F. Richards	2009-04-04	2016-10-01	80.7	7.5	10.1
Lynn G. Robbins	1997-04-05	2022-10-01	74	25.5	4.1
Gary B. Sabin	2016-04-02	2024-08-01	72.6	8.3	2.3
Cecil O. Samuelson Jr.	1994-10-01	2011-10-01	85.3	17	15.1
Evan A. Schmutz	2016-04-02	2024-08-01	72.5	8.3	2.3
Gregory A. Schwitzer	2009-04-04	2018-10-06	78.6	9.5	8.1
Joseph W. Sitati	2009-04-04	2022-10-01	74.5	13.5	4.1
Steven E. Snow	2001-03-31	2019-10-05	76.9	18.5	7.1
Octaviano Tenorio	2007-03-31	2012-10-06	84	5.5	14.1
Earl C. Tingey	1990-12-05	2008-10-04	92.4	17.8	18.1
Juan A. Uceda	2010-04-03	2023-08-01	73.3	13.3	3.3
Francisco J. Viñas	1996-04-06	2016-10-01	79.8	20.5	10.1
Terence M. Vinson	2013-04-06	2021-10-02	75.7	8.5	5.1
William R. Walker	2002-04-06	2014-10-04	82.4	12.5	12.1
F. Michael Watson	2008-04-05	2013-10-05	83.7	5.5	13.1
Robert E. Wells	1976-10-01	1997-10-04	98.8	21	29.1
Lance B. Wickman	1994-04-02	2010-10-02	86	16.5	16.1
Larry Y. Wilson	2011-04-02	2019-10-05	76.8	8.5	7.1
Kazuhiko Yamashita	2011-04-02	2023-08-01	73.2	12.3	3.3
Jorge F. Zeballos	2008-04-04	2025-08-01	71.3	17.3	1.3
Claudio D. Zivic	2007-03-31	2018-10-06	77.8	11.5	8.1
W. Craig Zwick	1995-04-01	2017-09-30	79.3	22.5	9.1

- ^{a} Date called as a general authority.
- ^{b} Date granted general authority emeritus status.
- ^{c} Years as general authority (not including time as an emeritus).

== See also ==
- List of area seventies (LDS Church)
- List of general officers (LDS Church)
