= PEFC =

PEFC may refer to:

- Proton-exchange fuel cell
- Programme for the Endorsement of Forest Certification – also known as Pan-European Forest Certification
- Perpetual Emigrating Fund Company
