= Conspiracy and siege of the Mountain Meadows Massacre =

1857 Mormon siege in Utah

The conspiracy and siege of the Mountain Meadows Massacre was initially planned by its Mormon perpetrators to be a short "Indian" attack, against the Baker–Fancher party. But the planned attack was repulsed and soon turned into a siege, which later culminated in the massacre of the remaining emigrants, on September 11, 1857.

== The Emigrants ==
The Arkansas emigrants, who were later attacked at Mountain Meadows, were traveling to California shortly before the Utah War began. After leaving Arkansas and traveling in several smaller groups these emigrants gathered together near Salt Lake City, Utah and became the Baker–Fancher party. As these emigrants were crossing into the Utah Territory, the Mormons throughout the Territory had been mustered to fight the advancing United States Army, which they believed was intent on destroying them as a people. It was during this period of tension that the Baker–Fancher party passed through the Utah Territory, and soon rumors among the Mormons linked the Baker–Fancher train with enemies who had participated in previous persecutions of Mormons along with more recent malicious acts.

After the party was organized they left Salt Lake City on or about August 5, 1857. As they passed through Utah, the emigrants were in need of supplies, but because of the possibility of war many Mormons refused to trade with them; this was one of several problems the emigrants would encounter. When passing through Provo, 40 miles south of Salt Lake City, the emigrants decided to stop and let their animals rest. An area just west of the town had been marked off, by the local settlers, as use for animal feed during the upcoming winter. The emigrants allowed their livestock to wander into this area, and after seeing this the local settlers asked the party to move on to another area a few miles to the west; even offering to help them move. One of the party's leaders refused saying "This is Uncle Sam's grass...We are staying right here.", so the settlers gave them the option of fighting or leaving; the party left. After camping the night, the Baker–Fancher party continued to pass through Utah over the next few weeks, arriving near Cedar City on Thursday, September 3, 1857.

Cedar City was the last major settlement where emigrants could stop to buy grain and supplies before a long stretch of wilderness leading to California. When the Baker–Fancher train arrived there, however, they were turned a cold shoulder once again; important goods were not available in the town store, and the local miller charged an exorbitant price for grinding grain. As tension between the Mormons and the emigrants mounted, a member of the Baker–Fancher train was said to have bragged how he had the very gun that "shot the guts out of Old Joe Smith". Other members of the party reportedly bragged about taking part in the Haun's Mill massacre some decades before in Missouri. Others were reported by Mormons to have threatened to join the incoming federal troops, or join troops from California, and march against the Mormons. According to one witness, the captain of the emigrant train, Alexander Fancher, rebuked these men on the spot for their inflammatory language against the Mormons.

After staying less than one hour in Cedar City, the emigrants passed over Leach's cutoff, passed the small town of Pinto and headed into Mountain Meadows. Here they stopped to rest and regroup their approximately 800 head of cattle.

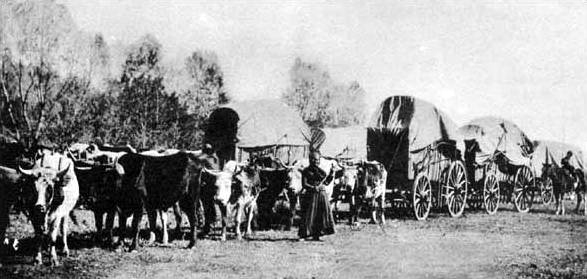
An emigrant wagon train

== The Mormons ==
The Mountain Meadows Massacre was caused in part by events relating to the Utah War, an 1858 invasion of the Utah Territory by the United States Army which ended up being peaceful. In the summer of 1857, however, Mormons expected an all-out invasion of apocalyptic significance. From July to September 1857, Mormon leaders prepared Mormons for a possible seven-year siege predicted by Brigham Young. Mormons were to stockpile grain, and were prevented from selling grain to any passing emigrants. As far-off Mormon colonies retreated, both Cedar City and nearby Parowan became isolated and vulnerable outposts. Brigham Young sought to enlist the help of Indian tribes in fighting the "Americans" (the approaching U.S. Army), and allowed them to steal cattle from emigrant trains.

In August 1857, Mormon apostle George A. Smith, set out on a tour of southern Utah, instructing Mormons to stockpile grain. He met with many of the eventual participants in the massacre, including William H. Dame, Isaac C. Haight, and John D. Lee. He noted that the militia was organized and ready to fight, and that some of them were anxious to "fight and take vengeance for the cruelties that had been inflicted upon us in the States". On his return trip to Salt Lake City, Smith camped near the Baker–Fancher party; a traveling partner of Smiths, Jacob Hamblin, suggested the Fanchers stop and rest their cattle at Mountain Meadows. Some of Smith's party claimed to have seen a member of the Baker–Fancher party poison the local Corn Creek and a dead ox, in order to kill Indians; a rumor that would precede the wagon train to Cedar City.

Among Smith's party were a number of Indian chiefs from Southern Utah. When Smith returned to Salt Lake, Brigham Young met with these leaders and Jacob Hamblin on September 1, 1857. Brigham Young asked them for their help with fighting the "Americans" (the advancing United States Army). The Indian chiefs were reportedly reluctant, saying they would let the Mormons fight while they, the Indians, "would raise grain." Yet, some scholars theorize, that the Indian leaders returned to Mountain Meadows and participated in the massacre. However, it is uncertain whether they would have had time to do so, as their traveling companion, Jacob Hamblin, did not return home until after the massacre.

=== Meetings at Cedar City ===
Today it is believed that the attack against the wagon train was planned by leaders in Iron County; after the Baker–Fancher party had left Cedar City. Several meetings were held in Cedar City and Parowan by the local Mormon Leaders, pondering how to implement Brigham Young's war time directives. At least nine southern Utah militiamen had already been sent out as scouts to the area's emigrant trails and mountain passes, looking for any advance parties of the United States dragoons. Major Isaac C. Haight, Mormon Stake President of Cedar City and second in command of the Iron County militia, sent a letter to William H. Dame, the militia's commanding officer and Stake President of Parowan, asking that the militia be called out against the Baker–Fancher party. Dame reportedly denied the request, but told Isaac Haight to let him know if the Fanchers committed any acts of violence. Haight, however, who was of equal rank to Dame in ecclesiastical matters, settled on a secondary plan to use the Native Americans instead of the militia. The plan was to ambush the emigrants in the Santa Clara Narrows, south of Mountain Meadows, and have their Indian allies do the killing. Whether Dame was privy to this plan is a matter of disagreement between the witnesses. According to one report, Isaac Haight said the "Indian attack" plan was being put in place under the religious authority of the Cedar City Stake, without William H. Dame's authorization as military commander. John D. Lee, however, said Isaac Haight told him that orders for the "Indian attack" came from William H. Dame. Philip Klingensmith reported that the orders came from "headquarters" other than Cedar City, but he was unsure whether that meant Parowan or Salt Lake City.

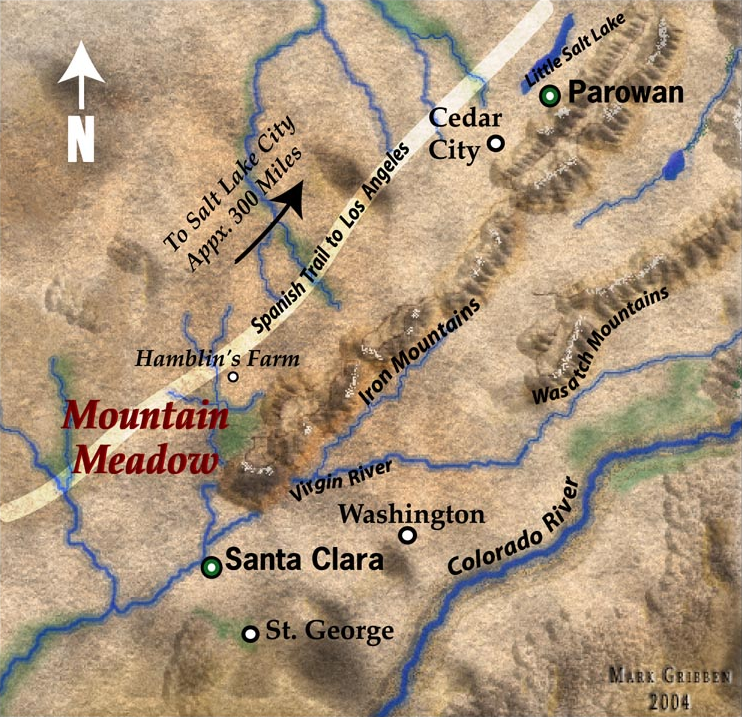
Mountain Meadows and surrounding region in 1857, showing path of Old Spanish Trail

Possibly on September 4, 1857, Haight had a meeting with John D. Lee ordering him to assemble Paiute fighters to head towards Mountain Meadows for the planned attack. Lee was a bishop, a territorial legislator, and a friend to Joseph Smith and Brigham Young, in both of whose service Lee had performed duties as a constable and of personal protection and was rumored to have meted out secret punishments as a Danite as well. Lee's meeting with Haight, according to Lee, took place late at night in Cedar City at the iron works, while they were wrapped in blankets against the cold.

In the afternoon of Sunday, September 6, Major Isaac C. Haight held his weekly Stake High Council meeting after church services, and brought up the issue of what to do with the emigrants. The Council believed that there were U.S. Army units approaching from the north and the south, and it was reported at the meeting that the Baker–Fancher party had threatened to "destroy every damned Mormon", and some of them had claimed to have killed Joseph Smith, and that some emigrants would wait at Mountain Meadows and then join with the approaching armies in a massacre of Mormons.

The plan for an Indian massacre of the Baker–Fancher train was discussed, but not all the Council members agreed it was the right approach. The Council resolved to take no action until Haight sent a rider (James Haslam) out the next day to carry an express to Salt Lake City (a six-day round trip on horseback) for Brigham Young's advice; as Utah did not yet have a telegraph system. Following the Council, Isaac C. Haight decided to send a messenger south to John D. Lee. What Haight told Lee remains a mystery, but considering the Council's decision to wait for advice from Brigham Young, he may have hoped Lee would back off the planned attack.

John M. Higbee was directed to command a special contingent of militia drawn from throughout the southern settlements whose initial orders were to coordinate the affair while maintaining a picket around the area's perimeter.

== Siege (September 7–10) ==
One witness claimed John D. Lee, left his home in Harmony on September 6, 1857 in the company of 14 Native Americans and headed toward Mountain Meadows. In the early morning of Monday, September 7 the Baker-Fancher party was attacked by as many or more than 200 Paiutes and Mormon militiamen disguised as Native Americans. Why John D. Lee changed the plans to attack the Wagon Train in the Santa Clara Narrows, and instead attacked at Mountain Meadows several days earlier, remains a mystery.

The attackers were positioned in a small ravine south-east of the emigrant camp. This ravine was about five feet deep and had been carved by the headwaters of Magotsu Creek. As the attackers shot into the camp, the Baker–Fancher party defended itself by encircling and lowering their wagons, wheels chained together, along with digging shallow trenches and throwing dirt both below and into the wagons, which made a strong barrier. Seven emigrants were killed during the opening attack and were buried somewhere within the wagon encirclement. Sixteen more were wounded. The attack continued for five days, during which the besieged families had little or no access to fresh water and their ammunition was depleted.

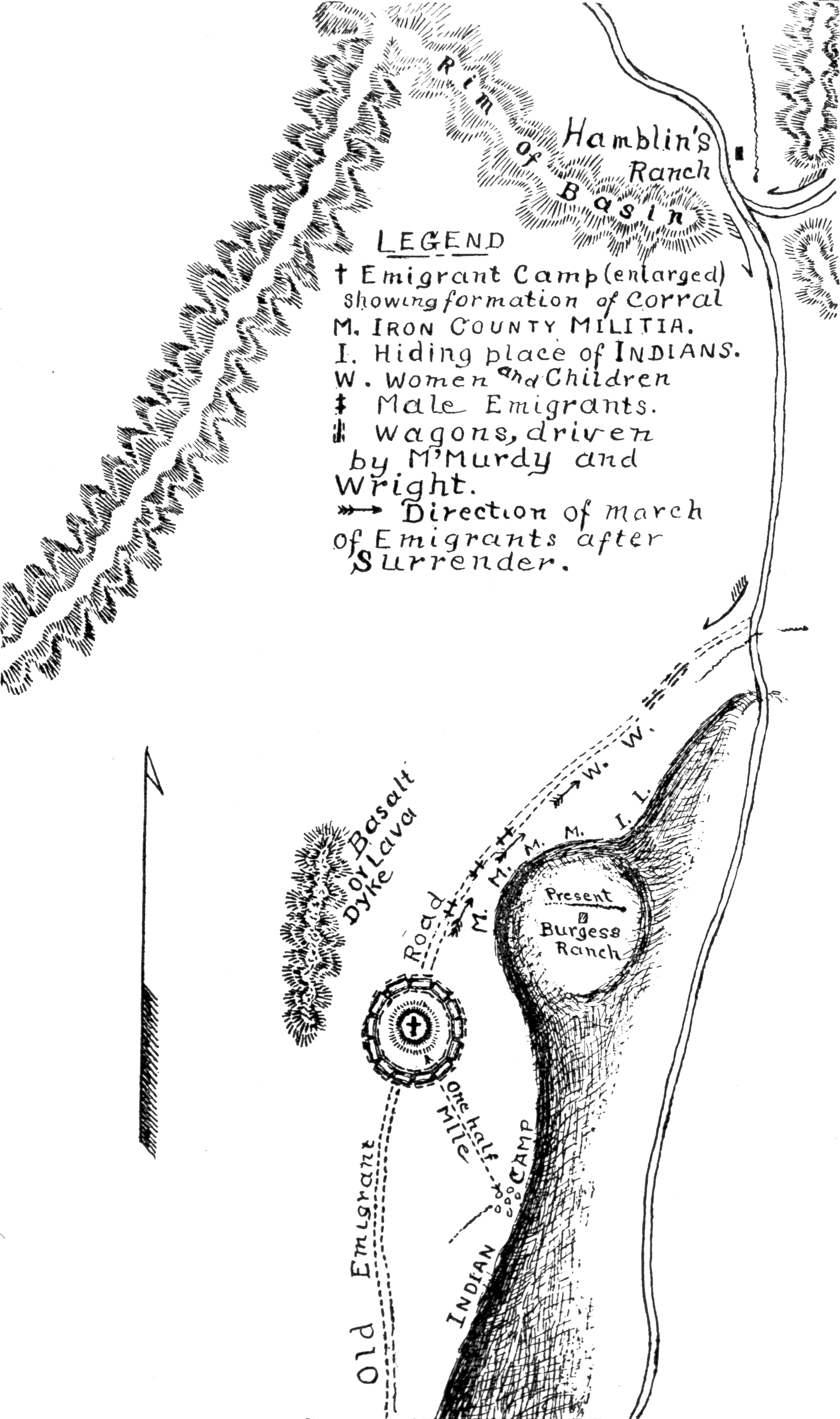
Map of the Meadows by Josiah F. Gibbs

According to one report, they attempted to send a little girl to a nearby spring for water, dressed in white, and she was fired upon, but escaped unharmed back to the camp. When two emigrant horsemen attempted to retrieve water, one was shot while another escaped, but not before seeing that the shooter was a white man.

On September 9, local Mormon leader Isaac C. Haight and his counselor Elias Morris visited Dame in Parowan, where the council decided that the militia would allow the emigrants to pass safely. After the Parowan council meeting, however, Haight spoke with Dame confidentially, relating the information that the emigrants probably already knew that Mormons were involved in the siege. This information changed Dame's mind, and he reportedly authorized a massacre.

== The Massacre ==
Following orders from Haight in Cedar City, 35 miles (56 km) away, on Friday, September 11, John Higbee ordered a group of militiamen not in disguise to march and stand in a formal line a half-mile from the Baker–Fancher party, then John D. Lee and William Batemen approached the Baker–Fancher party wagons with a white flag. Lee told the battle-weary emigrants he had negotiated a truce with the Paiutes, whereby they could be escorted safely to Cedar City under Mormon protection in exchange for leaving all their livestock and supplies to the Native Americans. Accepting this, they were split into three groups. Seventeen of the youngest children along with a few mothers and the wounded were put into wagons, which were followed by all the women and older children walking in a second group. Bringing up the rear were the adult males of the Baker–Fancher party, each walking with an armed Mormon militiaman at his right. Making their way back northeast towards Cedar City, the three groups gradually became strung out and visually separated by shrubs and a shallow hill. After about 1.5 miles (2 kilometers) Higbee gave the prearranged order, "Do Your Duty!" Each Mormon then turned and killed the man he was guarding. All of the men, women, older children and wounded were massacred by the Mormon militia and Paiutes who had hidden nearby. Approximately seventeen children were spared because of their young age, and were taken in by local Mormon families.

All of the Mormon participants in the massacre were then sworn to secrecy. The many dozens of bodies were hastily dragged into gullies and other low lying spots, then lightly covered with surrounding material which was soon blown away by the weather, leaving the remains to be scavenged and scattered by wildlife.
