= List of general officers (LDS Church) =

The following individuals are general officers of the Church of Jesus Christ of Latter-day Saints (LDS Church). LDS Church general officers are distinguished from general authorities; all general officers are members of a presidency of a church organization.

== Primary ==
Name	Position	Began tenure	Age	Assignments (where known)
Rosemary K. Chibota	General president	2026-08-01	58	Member, Temple and Family History Executive Council
Nina M. Garfield	First counselor	2026-08-01	68	Member, Missionary Executive Council
Theresa A. Collins	Second counselor	2026-08-01	65	Member, Priesthood and Family Executive Council

== Relief Society ==
Name	Position	Began tenure	Age	Assignments (where known)
Camille N. Johnson	General president	2022-08-01	63	Member, Priesthood and Family Executive Council; Member, Church Board of Education and Boards of Trustees; Member, Executive Committee
J. Anette Dennis	First counselor	2022-08-01	66	Member, Missionary Executive Council; Adviser, Liahona magazine.
Kristin M. Yee	Second counselor	2022-08-01	45	Member, Temple and Family History Executive Council

== Sunday School ==
Name	Position	Began tenure	Age	Assignments (where known)
Paul V. Johnson	General president	2024-08-01	72	
Chad H. Webb	First counselor	2024-08-01	61	
Gabriel W. Reid	Second counselor	2024-08-01	49	Adviser, Liahona, magazine.

== Young Men ==
Name	Position	Began tenure	Age	Assignments (where known)
Timothy L. Farnes	General president	2025-08-01	57	Member, Church Board of Education and Boards of Trustees.
David J. Wunderli	First counselor	2025-08-01	65	
Sean R. Dixon	Second counselor	2025-08-01	56	Adviser, For the Strength of Youth magazine.

== Young Women ==
Name	Position	Began tenure	Age	Assignments (where known)
Emily Belle Freeman	General president	2023-08-01	56	Member, Church Board of Education and Boards of Trustees. Member, Missionary Executive Council.
Tamara W. Runia	First counselor	2023-08-01	65	Temple and Family History Executive Council
Andrea M. Spannaus	Second counselor	2023-08-01	58	Member, Priesthood and Family Executive Council

== See also ==
- List of general authorities (LDS Church)
- List of area seventies (LDS Church)
