= Sam Wong =

Sam Wong may refer to:

- Chi Hong (Sam) Wong, general authority of the Church of Jesus Christ of Latter-day Saints
- Sam Wong (windsurfer), Hong Kong windsurfer

== See also ==
- Samuel Wong, American conductor and physician
- Samuel Wong (politician), Hong Kong politician
