= William R. Walker =

Canadian LDS Church leader

Second Quorum of the Seventy
- 6 April 2002 – 5 April 2008
- End reason: Transferred to First Quorum of the Seventy

First Quorum of the Seventy
- 5 April 2008 – 4 October 2014
- End reason: Designated an emeritus general authority

Emeritus General Authority
- October 4, 2014

Personal details
- Born: William Russell Walker; 25 May 1944 (age 80); Lethbridge, Alberta, Canada

William Russell Walker (born 25 May 1944) has been a general authority of the Church of Jesus Christ of Latter-day Saints (LDS Church) since 2002.

Walker was born to J. Harris and Beth Russell Walker in Lethbridge, Alberta, Canada, and raised in Raymond. As a young man, he was a LDS Church missionary in Japan. After his mission, Walker was educated at Brigham Young University in Provo, Utah.

Walker worked at executive positions with firms in the securities and investment banking fields in Vancouver, British Columbia; Cottonwood Heights, Utah; Concord, California; Dunwoody, Georgia; and Kenilworth, Illinois. He worked for American Express, Citibank, and Barclay's Bank and was a member of the board of directors of the Beneficial Financial Group.

== LDS Church service ==
In the LDS Church, Walker has served twice as a bishop and as president of the church's Japan Tokyo South Mission (1990–93). In April 2002, while serving as president of the Sandy Utah Cottonwood Creek Stake, Walker became a member of the Second Quorum of the Seventy.

In April 2008, Walker became a member of the First Quorum of the Seventy. As a general authority, he served as president of the Asia North Area and served as Executive Director of the church's Temple Department from 2007 to 2014.

While serving as Executive Director of the Temple Department, in July 2012, Walker was interviewed by Barbara Walters as part of a 20/20 special series on heaven. Walker also announced the construction of the Payson Utah Temple while Executive Director.

Walker was succeeded as Temple Department Executive Director by Kent F. Richards, a member of the Second Quorum of the Seventy. During the October 2014 General Conference, Walker was released from the First Quorum of the Seventy and designated an emeritus general authority.

== Personal life ==
Walker married Vicki Van Wagenen in Salt Lake City, Utah, in 1968. They are the parents of five children.

== See also ==
- Kent F. Richards
- List of general authorities of The Church of Jesus Christ of Latter-day Saints
