= List of area seventies (LDS Church) =

At the April 1995 general conference of the Church of Jesus Christ of Latter-day Saints (LDS Church), church president Gordon B. Hinckley announced the creation of a new leadership position known as the area authority. In 1997, area authorities were renamed area authority seventies and ordained to the office of seventy. The church announced that these seventies would become members of a Quorum of the Seventy based upon the geographic region to which they were assigned. Later, the title "area authority seventy" was shortened to area seventy, which is the title currently in use.

== Formation of the various Quorums of the Seventy ==
=== Third, Fourth, and Fifth quorums ===
When area authority seventies were first called in 1997, the Third, Fourth, and Fifth Quorums were created. At that time, the Third Quorum consisted of those seventies living in the church's Europe, Africa, Asia, Australia, and Pacific areas. The Fourth Quorum comprised those living in the Mexico, Central America, and South America areas. The Fifth Quorum of the Seventy comprised those living in the United States and Canada

=== Sixth Quorum ===
In July 2004, the Sixth Quorum of the Seventy was organized from the Fifth Quorum because the number of quorum members exceeded 70, the number of members prescribed by scripture. The Fifth Quorum then comprised area seventies serving in the church's North America Northwest, North America West, Idaho, Utah North, Utah Salt Lake City, and Utah South areas, while the Sixth Quorum comprised those living in the North America Central, North America East, North America Northeast, North America Southeast, and North America Southwest areas.

=== Seventh and Eighth quorums ===
In July 2005, the church announced that, due to the great distance members of the Third and Fourth Quorums of the Seventy had to travel to meet as quorums, the Seventh and Eighth Quorums of the Seventy would be created. The Third Quorum included those area seventies living in the church's Africa Southeast, Africa West, Europe Central, Europe East, and Europe West areas. The Fourth Quorum included those members living in the Brazil North, Brazil South, Chile, and South America South areas. The Fourth Quorum included those living in the Central America, Mexico North, Mexico South, South America North, and South America West areas.

=== Ninth, Tenth, Eleventh, and Twelfth quorums ===
On May 19, 2020, the church announced the creation of the Ninth, Tenth, Eleventh, and Twelfth Quorums of the Seventy, to enhance Quorum functionality, improve geographic alignment, and enhance cultural and language similarities among quorum members. The announcement also noted the adjustments would assist members of the Quorum of the Twelve Apostles and Presidency of the Seventy in providing more time and greater convenience in interactions with area seventies around the world. Additionally, the church announced changes in the geographical makeup of each quorum, with the composition of each of the now-ten quorums of area seventies being grouped by church area. These changes went into effect on June 1, 2020.

The quorums will be geographically aligned with those serving in the church's international areas as follows: Third–Africa, Fourth–Asia, Fifth–Brazil, Sixth–Caribbean, Central America, and Mexico areas, Seventh–Europe and Middle East/Africa North areas, Eighth–Philippines and Pacific Islands, and Ninth–South America areas. The final three quorums will consist of those serving in North America, including the United States and Canada.

The Canada, United States Central, United States Northeast, and United States Southeast Arreas comprise the Tenth Quorum; the United States Southwest and United States West Areas comprise the Eleventh Quorum; and the Utah Area Seventies now comprise the Twelfth Quorum.

== Sustaining/releasing changes ==
Initially, names of area seventies were announced during general conference, usually during the Saturday afternoon session. The names of all released and called area seventies were announced along with all other changes to the general authorities.

=== 2021 and 2022 ===
In 2021, following restrictions of the COVID-19 pandemic, leadership training was held in conjunction with the April general conference. As part of that training, the church sustained 77 new area seventies, rather than having a large list of names read over the pulpit during a session of general conference. The leadership training included a sustaining vote of the individuals.

With the names previously presented, during the Saturday afternoon sustaining, Dallin H. Oaks proposed the church sustain the new area seventies announced earlier in the week. In July 2021, M. Russell Ballard, the Acting President of the Quorum of the Twelve Apostles, sent out a letter noting a list of 66 area seventies who would be released effective August 1. The letter noted that the release of area seventies, effective August 1, would continue to be announced by letter going forward. During the Saturday afternoon session, members were invited to express appreciation for those released during the past year.

A similar practice occurred in 2022, with Oaks noting as a group those sustained and released in the April general conference. Releases effective August 1 were shared at the end of August, with Eyring inviting an expression of appreciation for those who were released as a group in October, along with presenting new area seventies who would begin serving, effective immediately.

=== From 2023 onward ===
During the April 2023 leadership meetings, 61 new area seventies were announced, and the release of 50 others that would be effective on or before August 1 were also presented. During the Saturday afternoon sustaining, those changes were presented in groups, with the note that the names of those released and sustained could be found on the church's newsroom website. Two others whose release was effective on August 1, and two new area seventies, were presented during the October 2023 leadership meetings and later ratified during the sustaining of church leadership.

This process has continued, new sustainings and releases that would be effective on or before August 1 are presented in advance at the April general conference leadership sessions and then presented for sustaining as groups during the sustaining of church leadership during the weekend conference, with occasional exceptions for necessary changes (such as illness, death, etc.) made between April and August which are then ratified at the October conference.

== Areas consolidated over the years ==
In the intervening years, along with the changes announced in quorum composition, the church's geographic areas were consolidated and realigned. Now each quorum is composed of area seventies in the following areas:

- Third Quorum: Africa Central, Africa South, and Africa West Areas.
- Fourth Quorum: Asia and Asia North Areas.
- Fifth Quorum: Brazil Area.
- Sixth Quorum: Caribbean, Central America, and Mexico Areas.
- Seventh Quorum: Eurasian, Europe Central, Europe North, and Middle East/Africa North Areas.
- Eighth Quorum: Pacific and Philippines Areas.
- Ninth Quorum: South America Northwest and South America South Areas.
- Tenth Quorum: Canada, United States Central, United States Northeast, and United States Southeast Areas
- Eleventh Quorum: United States Southwest and United States West Areas
- Twelfth Quorum: Utah Area

== Current area seventies ==
Contents
Third Quorum
Fourth Quorum
Fifth Quorum
Sixth Quorum
Seventh Quorum
Eighth Quorum
Ninth Quorum
Tenth Quorum
Eleventh Quorum
Twelfth Quorum

Below is a list of the 347 currently serving area seventies, as of August 2026.

Name	Quorum	Area	Date called	Age	City	Country/state
Daniel A. Abeo	Third	Africa West	4 April 2024	57	Nsawam	Ghana
Jonah Akekere	Third	Africa West	3 April 2025	59	Yenagoa	Nigeria
Patrick Appianti-Sarpong	Third	Africa West	1 April 2021	35	Accra	Ghana
Michel D. Avegnon	Third	Africa West	4 April 2025	54	Accra	Ghana
Johnny O. Baddoo	Third	Africa Central	30 March 2023	48	Nairobi	Kenya
Ignatius K. Baidoo	Third	Africa West	4 April 2025	56	Accra	Ghana
Victor O. Bassey	Third	Africa West	30 March 2023	54	Calabar	Nigeria
Willy Binene	Third	Africa Central	1 October 2022	54	Kananga	DR Congo
Nuno A. Campos	Third	Africa South	2 April 2026	39	Luanda	Angola
Sancho N. Chukwu	Third	Africa West	4 April 2024	58	Port Harcourt	Nigeria
William G. Coleman	Third	Africa West	3 April 2025	53	Cape Coast	Ghana
Freeman Dickie	Third	Africa South	3 April 2025	42	Beira	Mozambique
Samuel E. Eghan	Third	Africa West	2 April 2026	52	Accra	Ghana
Amândio A. Feijó	Third	Africa South	31 March 2022	40	Luanda	Angola
Jean Pierre A. L. Haboko	Third	Africa Central	3 October 2024	57	Kinshasa	DR Congo
Fredrick N. Igweh	Third	Africa West	2 April 2026	52	Port Harcourt	Nigeria
M. Franck Ilunga	Third	Africa Central	2 April 2026	42	Kolwezi	DR Congo
Ndalamba Ilunga	Third	Africa Central	30 March 2023	49	Lubumbashi	DR Congo
Kyoni Kasongo	Third	Africa Central	4 April 2024	49	Kolwezi	DR Congo
Anani Kouegan	Third	Africa West	2 April 2026	52	Lome	Togo
Carl F. Krauss	Third	Africa South	4 April 2024	57	Krugersdorp	South Africa
Sawman Machakaire	Third	Africa South	2 April 2026	43	Harare	Zimbabwe
Philip J. Mathemera	Third	Africa South	2 April 2026	62	Hatfield	Zimbabwe
Patrick O. Mawongo	Third	Africa Central	2 April 2026	53	Kananga	DR Congo
Ignatius Maziofa	Third	Africa South	4 April 2024	43	Harare	Zimbabwe
Siyabonga Mkhize	Third	Africa South	30 March 2023	47	Pietermaritzburg	South Africa
Ngqabutho F. Moyo	Third	Africa South	2 April 2026	44	Bulawayo	Zimbabwe
George Katembo Njogu Munene	Third	Africa Central	3 October 2024	47	Nairobi	Kenya
Albert Mutariswa	Third	Africa South	4 April 2024	58	Harare	Zimbabwe
Chardenb Ndinga	Third	Africa Central	1 October 2021	41	Pointe-Noire	Republic of the Congo
David Ngabizele	Third	Africa Central	31 March 2022	58	Kinshasa	DR Congo
Mathias N. Niambe	Third	Africa West	3 April 2025	43	Abidjan	Ivory Coast
Prince S. Nyanforh	Third	Africa West	3 April 2025	57	Monrovia	Liberia
Kabemba F. Nyembo	Third	Africa Central	3 April 2025	43	Mbuji-Mayi	DR Congo
Dennis K. Ocansey	Third	Africa West	2 April 2026	45	Accra	Ghana
Akingbade A. Ojo	Third	Africa West	3 April 2025	55	Ibadan	Nigeria
Jimmy C. Okot	Third	Africa Central	2 April 2026	51	Gayaza	Uganda
Sylvain G. Onagnelin	Third	Africa West	2 April 2026	53	Abidjan	Côte d’Ivoire
Justice N. Otuonye	Third	Africa West	31 March 2022	41	Aba	Nigeria
Sunday F. Oyedeji	Third	Africa West	2 April 2026	49	Egbeda	Nigeria
Kenneth Pambu	Third	Africa West	30 March 2023	44	Freetown	Sierra Leone
Kgomotso T. Sehloho	Third	Africa South	4 April 2024	42	Johannesburg	South Africa
Kofi G. Sosu	Third	Africa West	30 March 2023	53	Kumasi	Ghana
Mees Bulang-C. Tshiband	Third	Africa Central	3 April 2025	41	Mwene-Ditu	DR Congo
Chimaroke G. Udeichi	Third	Africa West	30 March 2023	53	Enugu	Nigeria
Asuquo E. Udobong	Third	Africa West	4 April 2024	47	Ado-Odo/Ota	Nigeria
Dwayne J. Van Heerden	Third	Africa South	4 April 2024	41	East London	South Africa
Name	Quorum	Area	Date called	Age	City	Country/state
Peter Bushi	Fourth	Asia	2 April 2026	46	Bangkok	Thailand
Stephen W. Dyer	Fourth	Asia	4 April 2024	61	Shanghai	China
Bun Huoch Eng	Fourth	Asia	30 March 2023	56	Phnom Penh	Cambodia
Darwin W. Halvorson	Fourth	Asia North	30 March 2023	60	Yachiyo	Japan
Shinjiro Hara	Fourth	Asia North	4 April 2024	61	Saitama	Japan
Motoshige Karino	Fourth	Asia North	3 April 2025	52	Togane	Japan
Dan Kawashima	Fourth	Asia North	4 April 2024	42	Fuchi	Japan
Yew Mun Kwan	Fourth	Asia	4 April 2024	55	Bukit Batok	Singapore
Natthapol Lattisophonkul	Fourth	Asia	3 April 2025	48	Bangkok	Thailand
Woo Cheol Lee	Fourth	Asia North	4 April 2024	53	Cheongju-si	South Korea
Wai Hung Mak	Fourth	Asia	4 April 2024	62	Sha Tin	Hong Kong
Odgerel Ochirjav	Fourth	Asia North	2 April 2026	58	Ulaanbaatar	Mongolia
Kyung Yeol Park	Fourth	Asia North	4 April 2024	48	Seoul	South Korea
Thịnh Phúc Phan	Fourth	Asia	2 April 2026	41		Vietnam
Nithya Kumar Sunderraj	Fourth	Asia	30 March 2023	45	Bangalore	India
Juswan Tandiman	Fourth	Asia	4 April 2024	62	Bekasi	Indonesia
Min Zu Wang	Fourth	Asia	31 March 2022	60	Taipei	Taiwan
Shih Ning (Steve) Yang	Fourth	Asia	4 April 2024	59	Taichung City	Taiwan
Name	Quorum	Area	Date called	Age	City	Country/state
Elzimar Gouvêa de Albuquerque	Fifth	Brazil	31 March 2022	48	Santana de Parnaíba	São Paulo Brazil
Mauricio A. Araújo	Fifth	Brazil	4 April 2024	45	São Paulo	São Paulo Brazil
Paulo M. Araujo	Fifth	Brazil	2 April 2026	59	São Paulo	São Paulo Brazil
Odilon Asevedo	Fifth	Brazil	3 April 2025	56	Londrina	Paraná Brazil
Carlos A. Baptista	Fifth	Brazil	3 April 2025	56	Porto Alegre	Rio Grande do Sul Brazil
Bruno V. Barros	Fifth	Brazil	31 March 2022	47	Maceió	Alagoas Brazil
Marco A. Becegato	Fifth	Brazil	3 April 2025	53	Goiânia	Goiás Brazil
Eber Antônio Beck	Fifth	Brazil	4 April 2024	59	São José	Santa Catarina Brazil
A. Kaulle Bezerra	Fifth	Brazil	30 March 2023	60	Fortaleza	Ceará Brazil
Rogério Boschi	Fifth	Brazil	28 Sept 2023	46	São Paulo	São Paulo Brazil
Kennedy F. Canuto	Fifth	Brazil	31 March 2022	49	Manaus	Amazonas Brazil
Palmênio C. Castro	Fifth	Brazil	3 April 2025	54	Jundiaí	São Paulo Brazil
J. Joel Fernandes	Fifth	Brazil	2 April 2026	65	Campina Grande	Paraíba Brazil
Roberto G. F. Leite	Fifth	Brazil	31 March 2022	47	Brasília	Federal District Brazil
Orson S. Lemos	Fifth	Brazil	2 April 2026	56	Recife	Pernambuco Brazil
Paulo Renato Marinho	Fifth	Brazil	31 March 2022	47	São Paulo	São Paulo Brazil
Charles P. Martins	Fifth	Brazil	3 April 2025	45	Campinas	São Paulo Brazil
João Luis Oppe	Fifth	Brazil	31 March 2022	56	Vargem Grande Paulista	São Paulo Brazil
Daniel Piros	Fifth	Brazil	31 March 2022	47	São Paulo	São Paulo Brazil
Pierre Portes	Fifth	Brazil	4 April 2024	49	Juiz de Fora	Minas Gerais Brazil
Irineu E. Prado	Fifth	Brazil	30 March 2023	51	São Paulo	São Paulo Brazil
Luis H. Silva	Fifth	Brazil	2 April 2026	47	Nova Iguaçu	Rio de Janeiro Brazil
Sandro Alex Silva	Fifth	Brazil	4 April 2024	50	Santana de Parnaíba	São Paulo Brazil
Francisco Valim	Fifth	Brazil	3 April 2025	61	São Paulo	São Paulo Brazil
Helton C. Vecchi	Fifth	Brazil	30 March 2023	57	Barueri	São Paulo Brazil
Name	Quorum	Area	Date called	Age	City	Country/state
Rafael Alcántara	Sixth	Mexico	2 April 2026	58	Mexico City	Mexico
J. Gerardo Álvarez	Sixth	Mexico	2 April 2026	54	Metepec	Mexico
Raúl Barrón	Sixth	Mexico	31 March 2022	47	Tecamac	Mexico
Juan G. Cardenas	Sixth	Mexico	4 April 2024	57	Madero	Mexico
Orlando A. Castaños	Sixth	Caribbean	30 March 2023	48	Santo Domingo	Dominican Republic
Lenin Cerón	Sixth	Mexico	2 April 2026	45	Toluca	Mexico
Victor Cortez Padilla	Sixth	Mexico	2 April 2026	61	Mazatlán	Mexico
Gustavo A. Cristales	Sixth	Central America	3 April 2025	59	Villa Nueva	Guatemala
Gregorio Davalos	Sixth	Mexico	4 April 2024	52	Culiacán	Mexico
Alirio B. Díaz	Sixth	Central America	2 April 2026	52	San Juan Ostuncalco	Guatemala
Favio M. Durán	Sixth	Central America	31 March 2022	59	Tegucigalpa	Honduras
Tomás García	Sixth	Mexico	30 March 2023	53	Tezontepec de Aldama	Mexico
Pedro E. Hernández	Sixth	Caribbean	30 September 2021	51	Punto Fijo	Venezuela
Paul E. Higueros	Sixth	Central America	2 April 2026	57	Villa Canales	Guatemala
Bhanu K. Hiranandani	Sixth	Caribbean	2 October 2025	50	Caracas	Venezuela
Ramiro Ibarra Sanchez	Sixth	Mexico	3 October 2024	55	Guaymas	Mexico
Paul H. Jean Baptiste	Sixth	Caribbean	1 April 2021	44	Pétion-Ville	Haiti
Moroni Dominguez Jimenez	Sixth	Mexico	3 April 2025	55	Mexicali	Mexico
Fritzner A. Joseph	Sixth	Caribbean	4 April 2024	66	Port-au-Prince	Haiti
Carlos J. Lantigua	Sixth	Caribbean	30 March 2023	48	Santo Domingo	Dominican Republic
Esau Lara	Sixth	Mexico	30 March 2023	43	Guadalupe	Mexico
Hans A. Martineau	Sixth	Mexico	2 April 2026	51	Metepec	Mexico
Arturo Martinez	Sixth	Mexico	3 April 2025	47	Mexico City	Mexico
Adrian Mendez	Sixth	Mexico	30 March 2023	59	San Fernando	Mexico
Javier F. Monestel	Sixth	Central America	30 March 2023	53	San Pablo	Costa Rica
Eduardo R. Mora	Sixth	Central America	31 March 2022	49	San José	Costa Rica
Cesar A. Morales	Sixth	Central America	2 April 2026	40	Mixco	Guatemala
Luis Navarro	Sixth	Caribbean	3 April 2025	43	Santo Domingo	Dominican Republic
Víctor Orozco	Sixth	Mexico	2 April 2026	40	Juchitán de Zaragoza	Mexico
Arturo D. Palmieri	Sixth	Mexico	30 March 2023	58	Mexico City	Mexico
Marvin I. Palomo	Sixth	Central America	4 April 2024	44	San Pedro Sula	Honduras
Hugo O. Panameño	Sixth	Central America	30 March 2023	44	San Salvador	El Salvador
Domingo J. Perez	Sixth	Caribbean	4 April 2024	55	Maracaibo	Venezuela
Oscar A. Perez	Sixth	Caribbean	4 April 2024	46	San Germán	Puerto Rico
Raul Perez	Sixth	Mexico	4 April 2024	47	Nealtican	Mexico
N. Benjamin Poóu	Sixth	Central America	2 April 2026	52	Cobán	Guatemala
Nelson Ramírez	Sixth	Mexico	31 March 2022	52	San Nicolás de los Garza	Mexico
Francisco Villanueva Rojas	Sixth	Mexico	3 October 2024	44	Santa Cruz Xoxocotlán	Mexico
Jesus E. Vazquez Roman	Sixth	Mexico	3 April 2025	51	Tuxtla Gutiérrez	Mexico
Luis D. Santana	Sixth	Caribbean	2 April 2026	46	Santo Domingo	Dominican Republic
Jose Estuardo Sazo	Sixth	Central America	31 March 2022	53	Mixco	Guatemala
Alejandro H. Treviño	Sixth	Mexico	30 March 2023	58	Monterrey	Mexico
Fernando Valdes	Sixth	Mexico	30 March 2023	39	Mexico City	Mexico
Edgar D. Valdez	Sixth	Mexico	2 April 2026	38	Tijuana	Mexico
Fernando Vivas	Sixth	Caribbean	2 October 2025	48	Caracas	Venezuela
Juan F. Zorilla	Sixth	Caribbean	4 April 2024	56	Caracas	Venezuela
Name	Quorum	Area	Date called	Age	City	Country/state
Vladimir N. Astashov (Note: Second Counselor,Eurasian Area)	Seventh	Eurasian	3 April 2025	45	Moscow	Russia
Roland J. Bäck (Note: Second Counselor, Middle East/Africa North Area)	Seventh	ME/AN	31 March 2022	45	Abu Dhabi	United Arab Emirates
Adrian Bettridge	Seventh	Europe North	30 March 2023	51	Chorleywood	England
Joep Boom	Seventh	Europe Central	31 March 2022	52	Tilburg	Netherlands
Bernhard Cziesla	Seventh	Europe Central	1 October 2022	57	Jakobwüllesheim	Germany
Aleksandr A. Drachyov (Note: President, Eurasian Area)	Seventh	Eurasian	1 April 2017	40	Novosibirsk	Russia
Mark Anthony Dundon	Seventh	Europe North	31 March 2022	45	Rotherham	England
Matthias A. Frost	Seventh	Europe Central	3 April 2023	47	Heidelberg	Germany
Ángel J. Gómez	Seventh	Europe Central	4 April 2024	54	Guadalajara	Spain
Thomas Hengst	Seventh	Europe Central	4 April 2024	59	Hohenstein-Ernstthal	Germany
Hikombo Hitoto	Seventh	Europe Central	2 April 2026	50	Aigné	France
Niels O. Jensen	Seventh	Europe Central	4 April 2024	47	Wedel	Germany
Samuel M. T. Koivisto	Seventh	Europe North	30 March 2023	54	Jyväskylä	Finland
Samuel López	Seventh	Europe Central	3 April 2025	44	Karben	Germany
Harri J. Myllylä	Seventh	Europe North	2 April 2026	51	Espoo	Finland
Emanuel Petrignani	Seventh	Europe Central	31 March 2022	41	Frankfurt	Germany
Paul Picard	Seventh	Europe Central	30 March 2023	45	Frankfurt	Germany
Martin Pilka	Seventh	Europe Central	30 March 2023	57	Prague	Czech Republic
Miguel Ribeiro	Seventh	Europe North	30 March 2023	54	Algueirão–Mem Martins	Portugal
Robert Schwartz	Seventh	Europe North	30 March 2023	45	Chelmsford	England
Scott Spencer	Seventh	Europe North	3 April 2025	47	Stanley	England
Mark G. Stewart	Seventh	Europe North	31 March 2022	49	Richmond	England
Roseveltt de Pina Teixeira	Seventh	Europe North	31 March 2022	40	Praia	Cape Verde
Nikolai Ustyuzhaninov (Note: First Counselor, Eurasian Area)	Seventh	Eurasian	31 March 2022	43	Perm	Russia
Yves S. Weidmann	Seventh	Europe Central	1 October 2022	46	Burgdorf	Switzerland
Name	Quorum	Area	Date called	Age	City	Country/state
Emmanuel Rodantes G. Abraham	Eighth	Philippines	3 April 2025	59	Los Baños	Philippines
Demetrio P. Agudo III	Eighth	Philippines	2 April 2026	54	Metro Manila	Philippines
Edmund L. Ang	Eighth	Philippines	3 April 2025	52	Ozamiz	Philippines
Anthony John Balledos	Eighth	Philippines	3 April 2025	62	Antipolo	Philippines
Philip J. Barton	Eighth	Pacific	4 April 2024	42	Bangor	Australia
Felix O. Bentayen	Eighth	Philippines	2 April 2026	45	Lucena City	Philippines
Brian G. Borela	Eighth	Philippines	4 April 2024	47	Pasay	Philippines
Danilo F. Costales	Eighth	Philippines	4 April 2024	60	Valenzuela City	Philippines
M. Sydney Daniels	Eighth	Pacific	3 April 2025	62	Hamilton	New Zealand
Siale Matavaha 'Eliesa	Eighth	Pacific	3 April 2025	50	Talau	Tonga
Denny Fa’alogo	Eighth	Pacific	4 April 2024	57	Apia	Samoa
Jerome G. Galotera	Eighth	Philippines	2 April 2026	49	Iloilo City	Philippines
George E. Guidi	Eighth	Pacific	4 April 2024	56	Dumbéa	New Caledonia
John R. Higgins	Eighth	Pacific	4 April 2024	63	Hamilton	New Zealand
H. James Joseph	Eighth	Pacific	3 April 2025	50	Apia	Samoa
Josue G. Jundos	Eighth	Philippines	2 April 2026	43	San Fernando	Philippines
G. Kenneth Lee	Eighth	Philippines	30 March 2023	50	Pasig	Philippines
Richard G. Manáhan	Eighth	Philippines	3 April 2025	51	Camiling	Philippines
Wayne E. Maurer	Eighth	Pacific	30 March 2023	65	Cedar Creek	Australia
Thelmo P. Navarra Jr.	Eighth	Philippines	2 April 2026	47	Kabankalan City	Philippines
Jeffrey M. Nikoia	Eighth	Pacific	3 April 2025	61	Hamilton	New Zealand
Stephen F. Notarte	Eighth	Philippines	2 April 2026	51	Makati City	Philippines
D. Dan Nuñez	Eighth	Philippines	2 April 2026	46	Cebu City	Philippines
Jared V. Ormsby	Eighth	Pacific	30 March 2023	44	Christchurch	New Zealand
Huri Parata	Eighth	Pacific	3 April 2025	59	Lower Hutt	New Zealand
Craig W. J. Raeside	Eighth	Pacific	31 March 2022	62	Marden	Australia
Wilfredo E. Rellora	Eighth	Philippines	2 April 2026	44	Imus City	Philippines
Jon P. Reyes	Eighth	Philippines	2 April 2026	42	Batangas	Philippines
Jaime N. Rivera Jr.	Eighth	Philippines	3 April 2025	50	Taguig	Philippines
Jose Antonio San Gabriel	Eighth	Philippines	31 March 2022	59	Cebu	Philippines
Robert H. Simpson	Eighth	Pacific	1 April 2021	63	Casula	Australia
Graham F. Smith	Eighth	Pacific	2 April 2026	64	Tamborine	Australia
Michael J. Stone	Eighth	Pacific	2 April 2026	64	Biggera Waters	Australia
Paul J. Thomas	Eighth	Pacific	2 April 2026	52	Parrearra	Australia
Manea Tuahu	Eighth	Pacific	2 April 2026	46	Arue	Australia
Sione Tuione	Eighth	Pacific	1 October 2022	50	Auckland	New Zealand
Tomasito S. Zapanta	Eighth	Philippines	30 March 2023	48	Rizal	Philippines
Name	Quorum	Area	Date called	Age	City	Country/state
Jose A. Jimenez Alava	Ninth	SA Northwest	3 April 2025	44	Durán	Ecuador
Isaías Alcala	Ninth	SA Northwest	30 March 2023	39	Oruro	Bolivia
Miguel Avila	Ninth	SA Northwest	3 October 2024	40	Lima	Peru
Carlos Ernesto Velasco Barron	Ninth	SA Northwest	31 March 2022	53	Sacaba	Bolivia
Ricardo J. Battista	Ninth	SA South	1 October 2022	64	Buenos Aires	Argentina
Oscar Bedregal	Ninth	SA South	31 March 2022	52	La Plata	Argentina
Jaime A. Bravo	Ninth	SA South	4 April 2024	54	Santiago	Chile
Gabriel A. Campos	Ninth	SA South	3 April 2025	52	Santiago	Chile
Carlos G. Cantero	Ninth	SA South	30 March 2023	39	Santa Fe	Argentina
Jorge R. Cardozo	Ninth	SA South	2 April 2026	61	Resistencia	Argentina
Juan Pablo Cortez	Ninth	SA South	2 April 2026	48	Montevideo	Uruguay
Daniel A. Cruzado	Ninth	SA Northwest	4 April 2024	48	La Molina	Peru
Julio N. Del Sero	Ninth	SA South	4 April 2024	41	Mendoza	Argentina
Luis A. Ferrizo	Ninth	SA South	4 April 2024	47	Montevideo	Uruguay
Fernando R. García	Ninth	SA Northwest	30 March 2023	39	Lima	Peru
Henry Herrera	Ninth	SA Northwest	30 March 2023	39	Lima	Peru
Miguel A. Honores	Ninth	SA South	2 April 2026	42	Valparaíso	Chile
Kleber A. Litardo	Ninth	SA Northwest	2 April 2026	56	Guayaquil	Ecuador
Osvaldo E. Martinez Carreño	Ninth	SA South	2 April 2026	57	Buenos Aires	Argentina
Andres D. Moreno	Ninth	SA South	2 April 2026	49	Cañuelas	Argentina
David E. Mouhsen	Ninth	SA South	3 April 2025	53	Lomas de Zamora	Argentina
Z. Rudy Palhua	Ninth	SA Northwest	30 March 2023	39	La Molina	Peru
Marcelo J. Paz	Ninth	SA South	2 April 2026	54	Buenos Aires	Argentina
Marco A. Quezada	Ninth	SA Northwest	4 April 2024	57	Santa Cruz de la Sierra	Bolivia
David A Reyes	Ninth	SA South	3 April 2025	43	Antofagasta	Chile
Carlos J. Rodriguez	Ninth	SA Northwest	2 April 2026	44	Trujillo	Peru
Marco N. Sosa	Ninth	SA South	3 April 2025	45	Ñemby	Paraguay
Oswaldo J. Soto	Ninth	SA Northwest	31 March 2022	40	Puno	Peru
Martin R. Tello Sotil	Ninth	SA Northwest	2 April 2026	54	Lima	Peru
A. Enrique Texeira	Ninth	SA South	3 October 2024	42	Lambaré	Paraguay
Jose J. Trovato	Ninth	SA South	2 April 2026	48	San Pablo	Argentina
Nefi M. Trujillo	Ninth	SA Northwest	30 March 2023	39	Quito	Ecuador
Juan F. Vásquez	Ninth	SA South	2 April 2026	47	Santiago	Chile
Jose R. Cardenas Venegas	Ninth	SA Northwest	3 April 2025	54	Bogotá	Colombia
Sergio Villa	Ninth	SA Northwest	31 March 2022	45	Medellín	Colombia
Andres Villegas	Ninth	SA Northwest	2 April 2026	57	Jamundí	Colombia
Leopoldo Zuñiga	Ninth	SA Northwest	4 April 2024	49	Martínez	Argentina
Name	Quorum	Area	Date called	Age	City	Country/state
Douglas W. Atwood	Tenth	Canada	3 April 2025	56	Lethbridge	Alberta
Bradley S. Bateman	Tenth	US Central	4 April 2024	44	Iona	Idaho
Eric Baxter	Tenth	US Northeast	31 March 2022	48	Silver Spring	Maryland
Eric D. Bednar	Tenth	US Southeast	4 April 2024	47	Crestwood	Kentucky
Brett V. Benson	Tenth	US Southeast	2 April 2026	52	Nashville	Tennessee
Christopher B. Bingham	Tenth	US Southeast	2 April 2026	53	APEX	North Carolina
Steven L. Bodhaine	Tenth	US Southeast	3 April 2025	63	APEX	North Carolina
Michael P. Brady	Tenth	US Northeast	31 March 2022	50	Bel Air	Maryland
Thaddeus M. Brown	Tenth	US Central	3 April 2025	51	Cheyenne	Wyoming
Michel J. Carter	Tenth	Canada	5 October 2019	65	Brome Lake	Quebec
Robert M. Chaggares	Tenth	Canada	3 April 2025	48	Queensville	Ontario
Andrew J. Child	Tenth	US Central	3 April 2025	50	Naperville	Illinois
John N. Craig	Tenth	Canada	31 March 2018	58	Calgary	Alberta
Nathan R. Emery	Tenth	US Southeast	1 October 2022	52	Belleair	Florida
Jacob C. Fish	Tenth	US Southeast	3 April 2025	48	Panama City Beach	Florida
C. Alan Gauldin	Tenth	US Southeast	30 March 2023	63	Prairie Grove	Arkansas
Rodney H. Hillam	Tenth	US Central	3 April 2025	62	Idaho Falls	Idaho
Rhett R Hintze	Tenth	US Northeast	2 April 2026	55	Etters	Pennsylvania
Kirt L. Hodges	Tenth	US Central	28 Sept 2023	64	Idaho Falls	Idaho
Shane T. Holdaway	Tenth	US Northeast	3 April 2025	48	Richmond	Virginia
Nathan L. Johnson	Tenth	US Northeast	3 April 2025	50	Euclid	Ohio
J. Joseph Kiehl	Tenth	US Central	4 April 2024	49	Meridian	Idaho
Stephen J. Larson	Tenth	US Central	30 March 2023	57	Meridian	Idaho
R. Wade Litchfield	Tenth	US Southeast	2 April 2026	63	Palm Beach Gardens	Florida
David R. Marriott	Tenth	US Northeast	4 April 2024	56	Rye	New York
Robert Mendenhall	Tenth	Canada	30 March 2023	63	Sherwood Park	Alberta
Scott M. Naatjes	Tenth	US Northeast	2 April 2026	59	Credit River	Minnesota
M. Shayne Olsen	Tenth	Canada	2 April 2026	58	Kamloops	British Columbia
G. Michael Ortiz	Tenth	US Central	3 April 2025	49	Blue Springs	Missouri
Joshua K. Perkes	Tenth	US Central	2 April 2026	47	Elkhorn	Nebraska
David J. Pickett	Tenth	US Central	30 March 2023	56	Oakley	Idaho
Christopher R. Price	Tenth	US Central	30 March 2023	55	Missoula	Montana
James N. Robinson	Tenth	US Southeast	30 March 2023	48	Miramar	Florida
Ryan A. Robinson	Tenth	US Northeast	2 April 2026	51	Fortville	Indiana
Kurt F. Scherer	Tenth	US Southeast	2 April 2026	45	Windermere	Florida
Gregory A. Scott	Tenth	US Southeast	30 March 2023	56	Winston-Salem	North Carolina
Dominic R. Sénéchal	Tenth	Canada	30 March 2023	48	Mascouche	Quebec
Scott N. Taylor	Tenth	US Northeast	31 March 2022	53	Franklin	Massachusetts
Christopher L. Thomas	Tenth	US Central	2 April 2026	56	Highlands Ranch	Colorado
Kevin C. Thompson	Tenth	Canada	2 April 2026	51	Calgary	Alberta
Brent B. Ward	Tenth	US Northeast	30 March 2023	48	Ann Arbor	Michigan
David A. Winters	Tenth	US Southeast	3 April 2025	59	Peachtree Corners	Georgia
Name	Quorum	Area	Date called	Age	City	Country/state
Troy A. Bair	Eleventh	US West	2 April 2026	50	Rescue	California
Randall A. Brown	Eleventh	US West	31 March 2022	46	Cornelius	Oregon
David L. Chandler	Eleventh	US West	3 April 2025	53	Medford	Oregon
Brandon J. Child	Eleventh	US West	2 April 2026	50	East Wenatchee	Washington
Mark J. Cluff	Eleventh	US Southwest	4 April 2024	50	Broken Arrow	Oklahoma
Bryan C. Crawley	Eleventh	US West	3 April 2025	56	Palmdale	California
Robert L. Davis	Eleventh	US West	3 April 2025	58	Aliso Viejo	California
Ryan E. Dobbs	Eleventh	US Southwest	4 April 2024	53	Reno	Nevada
Robert K. Ellis	Eleventh	US Southwest	3 April 2025	42	Spring	Texas
Brandon C. Ellison	Eleventh	US Southwest	2 April 2026	45	Benbrook	Texas
Nathan R. Fernley	Eleventh	US West	2 April 2026	49	Long Beach	California
Jeremy B. Grisel	Eleventh	US Southwest	3 April 2025	50	Providence Village	Texas
Daniel L. Harris	Eleventh	US Southwest	4 April 2024	52	Vidor	Texas
Todd D. Haynie	Eleventh	US Southwest	4 April 2024	53	Thatcher	Arizona
James A. Jarvis	Eleventh	US Southwest	3 April 2025	56	Mesa	Arizona
Marcus F. Johnson	Eleventh	US Southwest	2 April 2026	39	Tempe	Arizona
John S. K. Kauwe III	Eleventh	US West	4 April 2024	43	Laie	Hawaii
John W. Lewis	Eleventh	US Southwest	31 March 2022	64	Gilbert	Arizona
Israel Marin	Eleventh	US West	30 March 2023	52	Vista	California
John L. Merrill	Eleventh	US West	2 April 2026	55	Newbury Park	California
Jason T. Morris	Eleventh	US Southwest	2 April 2026	52	Henderson	Nevada
Daniel W. Packard	Eleventh	US Southwest	2 April 2026	57	San Antonio	Texas
Omar I. Palacios	Eleventh	US West	4 April 2020	51	Irvine	California
Kevin J. Parks	Eleventh	US West	30 March 2023	46	Eagle River, Anchorage	Alaska
Juan T. Quilantan	Eleventh	US Southwest	3 April 2025	50	Phoenix	Arizona
Gary M. Riding	Eleventh	US Southwest	2 April 2026	62	Highland Village	Texas
Matthew L. Riggs	Eleventh	US Southwest	3 April 2025	59	Gilbert	Arizona
Guillermo Rojas	Eleventh	US Southwest	4 April 2024	49	Houston	Texas
Brondon Shaheen	Eleventh	US Southwest	2 April 2026	42	Gallup	New Mexico
Nathan Y. Sharp	Eleventh	US Southwest	2 April 2026	49	College Station	Texas
Craig R. Spangler	Eleventh	US West	2 April 2026	55	Port Orchard	Washington
Jared M. Spataro	Eleventh	US West	3 April 2025	50	Issaquah	Washington
Christopher Stephenson	Eleventh	US West	2 April 2026	51	Penryn	California
Thomas A. Thomas	Eleventh	US Southwest	30 March 2023	65	Las Vegas	Nevada
Paula S. Tonga	Eleventh	US West	2 April 2026	58	San Bruno	California
Gordon L. Treadway	Eleventh	US West	31 March 2022	56	Temecula	California
Kyle A. Vest	Eleventh	US Southwest	31 March 2022	47	Amarillo	Texas
Brian J. Willey	Eleventh	US Southwest	2 April 2026	49	Coppell	Texas
Name	Quorum	Area	Date called	Age	City	Country/state
Randy T. Austin	Twelfth	Utah	4 April 2024	58	Alpine	Utah
Timothy L. Barney	Twelfth	Utah	3 April 2025	57	Holladay	Utah
Jared Black	Twelfth	Utah	4 April 2024	56	Richmond	Utah
Emerson B. Carnavale	Twelfth	Utah	30 March 2023	41	Washington	Utah
Carlton J. Christensen	Twelfth	Utah	3 April 2025	59	Salt Lake City	Utah
Sean F. D. Collins	Twelfth	Utah	3 April 2025	58	Heber	Utah
Andrew E. Dadson	Twelfth	Utah	2 April 2026	50	Vineyard	Utah
Loren C. Dalton	Twelfth	Utah	3 April 2025	63	Draper	Utah
Martin P. Fernández	Twelfth	Utah	4 April 2024	51	Eagle Mountain	Utah
W. Brent Graham	Twelfth	Utah	3 April 2025	65	Holladay	Utah
Matthew R. Hall	Twelfth	Utah	2 April 2026	54	Salt Lake City	Utah
Jed J Hancock	Twelfth	Utah	30 March 2023	45	Wellsville	Utah
Scott L. Hymas	Twelfth	Utah	31 March 2022	60	Kaysville	Utah
Aaron R. Jenne	Twelfth	Utah	3 April 2025	51	North Salt Lake	Utah
Jason C. Jensen	Twelfth	Utah	31 March 2022	52	Lehi	Utah
Ronald M. Judd	Twelfth	Utah	3 April 2025	61	Sandy	Utah
Roland E. Léporé	Twelfth	Utah	3 April 2025	47	Alpine	Utah
Blaine R. Maxfield	Twelfth	Utah	31 March 2022	49	South Jordan	Utah
Lee G. McCann II	Twelfth	Utah	30 March 2023	57	Orem	Utah
Derek B. Miller	Twelfth	Utah	4 April 2024	51	Salt Lake City	Utah
Kelend I. Mills	Twelfth	Utah	3 April 2025	50	Mapleton	Utah
Thomas B. Morgan	Twelfth	Utah	30 March 2023	63	Sandy	Utah
Lincoln D. Nadauld	Twelfth	Utah	2 April 2026	49	Santa Clara	Utah
Nadmid B. Namgur	Twelfth	Utah	2 April 2026	49	South Jordan	Utah
Reid L. Neilson	Twelfth	Utah	2 April 2026	53	Bountiful	Utah
Gayle L. Pollock	Twelfth	Utah	4 April 2024	60	Tropic	Utah
Matthew O. Richardson	Twelfth	Utah	3 April 2025	60	Orem	Utah
Steven T. Rockwood	Twelfth	Utah	4 April 2024	61	Draper	Utah
Stephen M. Sargent	Twelfth	Utah	3 April 2025	58	Fruit Heights	Utah
Todd B. Smith	Twelfth	Utah	3 April 2025	61	Centerville	Utah
David L. Smith	Twelfth	Utah	3 April 2025	52	Heber City	Utah
Craig M. Teuscher	Twelfth	Utah	3 April 2025	57	Park City	Utah
Terry E. Welch	Twelfth	Utah	3 April 2025	61	Farmington	Utah
Ritch N. Wood	Twelfth	Utah	2 April 2026	60	Alpine	Utah

== See also ==
- List of general authorities (LDS Church)
- List of general officers (LDS Church)
