= Kent F. Richards =

Second Quorum of the Seventy
- April 4, 2009 – October 1, 2016
- Called by: Thomas S. Monson
- End reason: Designated an emeritus general authority

Emeritus General Authority
- 1 October 2016
- Called by: Thomas S. Monson

Personal details
- Born: Kent Farnsworth Richards; February 25, 1946 (age 79); Salt Lake City, Utah, United States

Kent Farnsworth Richards (born February 25, 1946) has been a general authority of the Church of Jesus Christ of Latter-day Saints (LDS Church) since 2009.

Richards received a Bachelor of Science degree in medicine from the University of Utah in 1969, and a doctor of medicine degree from the same school in 1972. He began work as a surgeon for Intermountain Health Care's (IHC) Bryner Clinic in 1977 and later served for four years as a Senior Vice President of IHC. Richards was also a clinical professor of surgery at the University of Utah, chairman of the department of surgery at LDS Hospital, and a member of the board and executive committee of the IHC board of trustees.

== LDS Church service ==
Richards has served in the LDS Church as a full-time missionary in the Southern Mexican Mission, elders quorum president, scoutmaster, bishop, high councilor, and stake president. In 1998, he suspended his medical practice and he and his wife moved their family to San Antonio, Texas, to accept a three-year assignment as president of the San Antonio Mission. In 2009, he retired from his medical practice when he was called as a general authority and member of the Second Quorum of the Seventy. His assignments as a general authority included serving in the presidencies of the church's South America South, Chile and Europe areas.

He served as an assistant executive director of the church's Temple Department before being appointed in 2014 to succeed William R. Walker as the department's executive director. While serving as Executive Director he was involved numerous temple dedications including the Phoenix Arizona Temple. He served in this assignment until August 2016, when he was succeeded by Larry Y. Wilson. In October 2016, he was released from active service and designated an emeritus general authority.

== Personal life ==
Richards married Marsha Gurr in 1968 and they are the parents of eight children. He is a descendant of early LDS Church leaders Willard Richards, George F. Richards and Franklin D. Richards.

== Books ==
- A Family of Faith: An Intimate View of Church History From Three Generations of Apostles, Deseret Book Company, (1609073940), 2013.

== See also ==
- William R. Walker
- List of general authorities of The Church of Jesus Christ of Latter-day Saints
