= Payson Utah Temple =

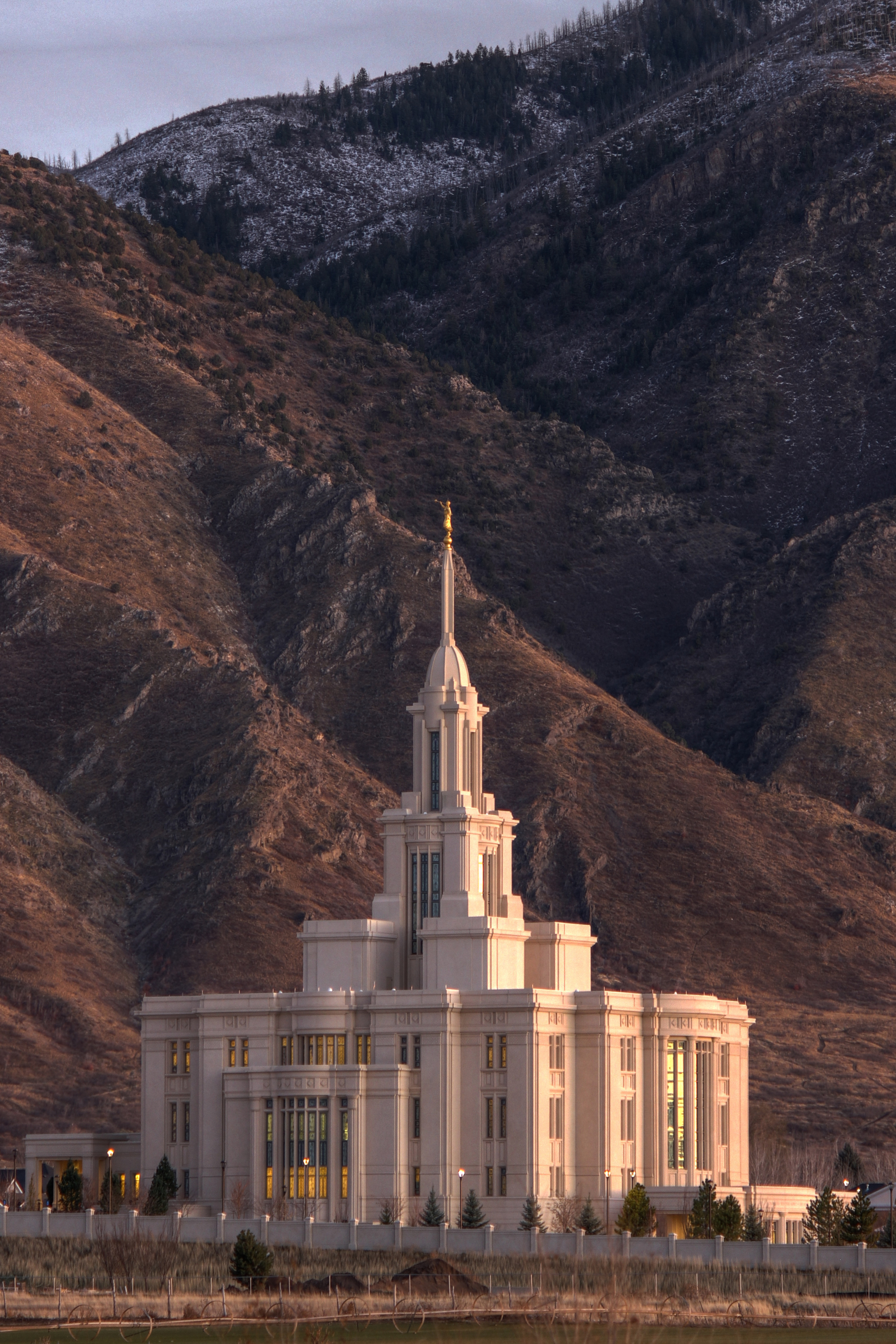
- Interactive map of Payson Utah Temple
- Number: 146
- Dedication: June 7, 2015, by Henry B. Eyring
- Site: 10.63 acres (4.30 ha)
- Floor area: 96,630 ft^{2} (8,977 m^{2})
- Official website • News & images

Church chronology
← Córdoba Argentina Temple	Payson Utah Temple	→ Trujillo Peru Temple

Additional information
- Announced: January 25, 2010, by Thomas S. Monson
- Groundbreaking: October 8, 2011, by Dallin H. Oaks
- Open house: April 24-May 23, 2015
- Current president: Rodolfo Alalay Carlos
- Location: Payson, Utah, U.S.
- Coordinates: 40°1′7.52″N 111°44′54.07″W
- Baptistries: 1
- Ordinance rooms: 3
- Sealing rooms: 7
- Clothing rental: Yes
- Notes: A public open house was held from April 24-May 23, 2015, excluding Sundays, and the temple was dedicated in three sessions on June 7, 2015.

The Payson Utah Temple is a temple of the Church of Jesus Christ of Latter-day Saints in Payson, Utah. The intent to build the temple was announced in a news release on January 25, 2010, by church president Thomas S. Monson. The temple is located on the southernmost edge of Utah's Wasatch Front, and is the state's 15th temple.

The temple has a single attached central spire with a statue of the angel Moroni. The temple designed by the firm Architectural Nexus. A groundbreaking ceremony, to signify the beginning of construction, was held on October 8, 2011, conducted by Dallin H. Oaks of the Quorum of the Twelve Apostles. The temple was dedicated by Henry B. Eyring, of the church's First Presidency, on June 7, 2015.

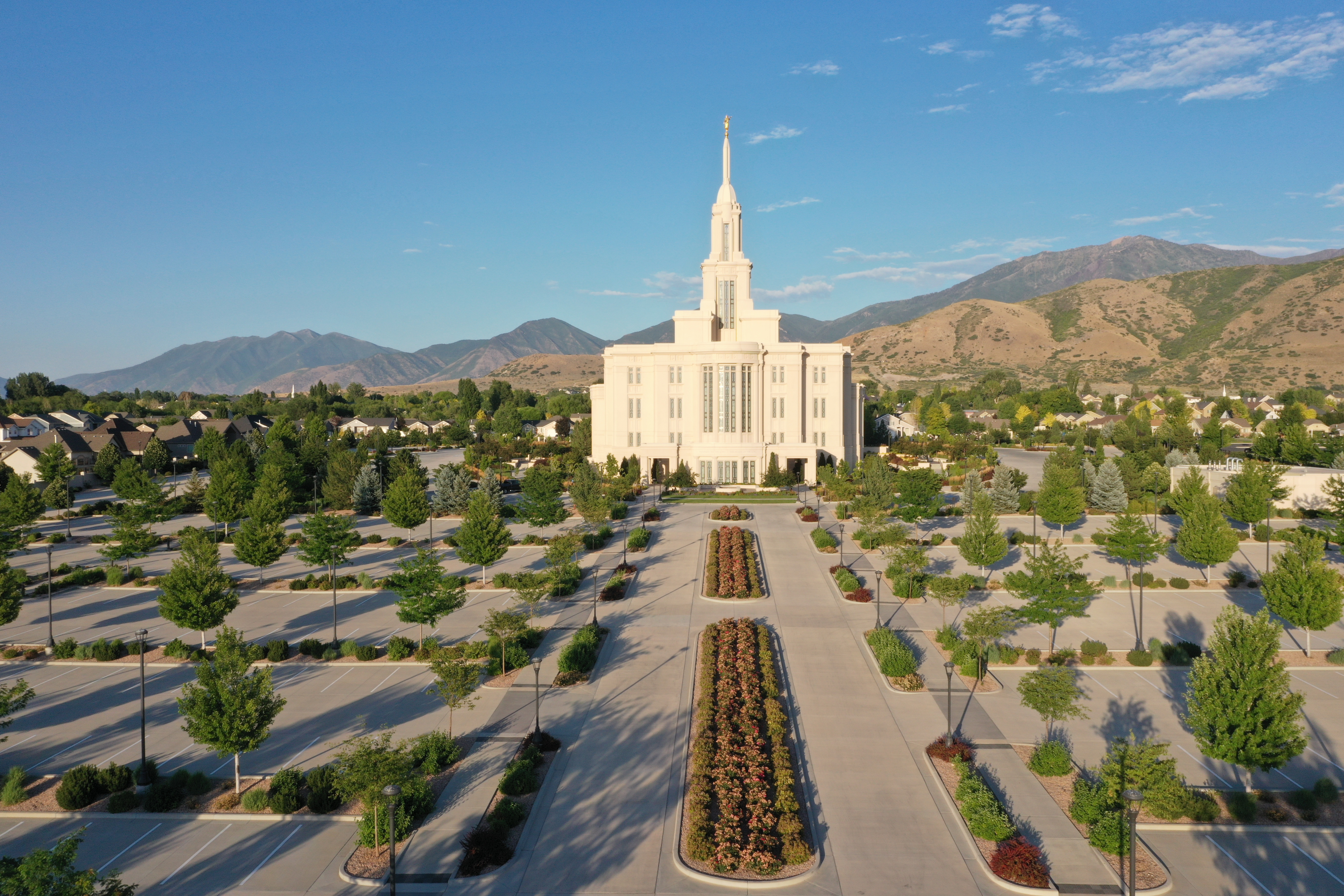
Payson Utah Temple

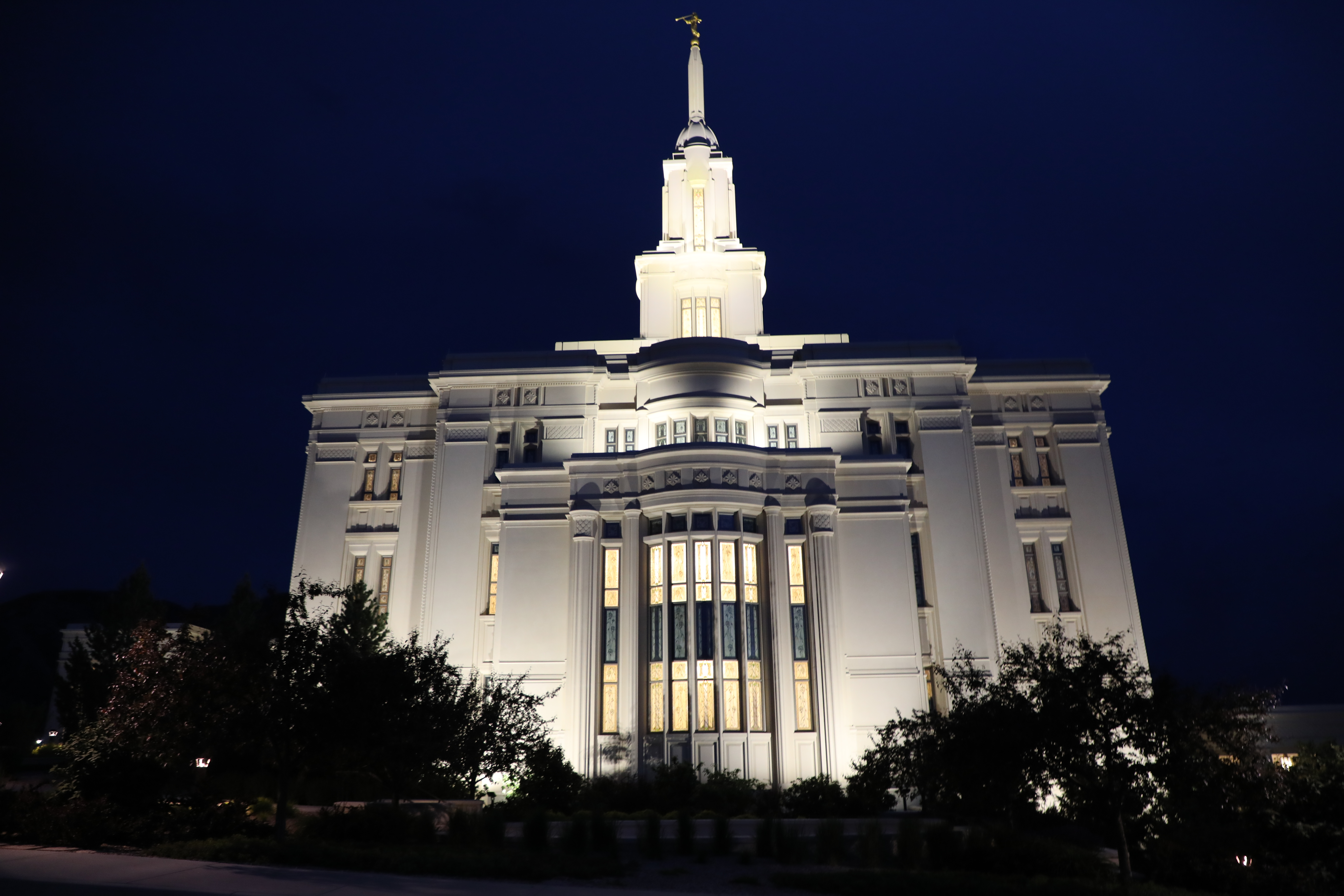
Payson Utah Temple

== History ==
The intent to construct the temple was announced on January 25, 2010, by church president Thomas S. Monson. The temple is located near the intersection of 930 West and 1550 South in Payson, on previously undeveloped land. Additional details, such as the planned size, were announced later. The city boundaries of Payson were extended by approximately 250 acres in the South Meadows Annexation, presented on July 14, 2010 and approved the next month. The temple site was deeded to the church on August 6, 2010.

Dallin H. Oaks presided at the groundbreaking ceremony on October 8, 2011, with William R. Walker conducting and Steven E. Snow, Jay E. Jensen, and Janette Hales Beckham also in attendance. Jason Chaffetz (representative for Utah's 3rd congressional district, which includes Payson) participated in the shovel ceremony.

When construction was completed in 2015, the temple became one of the largest built in recent years, at 96,630 square feet on a 15-acre lot. A public open house was held from April 24 to May 23, 2015, excluding Sundays. The temple was dedicated by Henry B. Eyring on June 7, 2015.

In 2020, like all the church's others, the Payson Utah Temple was closed for a time in response to the COVID-19 pandemic.

== Design and architecture ==
The temple was built in a "classical architectural style influenced by the pioneer vernacular architecture of the area". Designed by Architectural Nexus, its architecture reflects both the cultural heritage of the city of Payson and its spiritual significance to the church.

The temple is on a 10.63-acre plot, and the landscaping around the temple features scenic views of the nearby mountains. These elements are designed to provide a tranquil setting that enhances the sacred atmosphere of the site.

The structure stands 208 feet tall, and was constructed with precast concrete panels. The exterior's color is "evocative of historically used native stone and masonry", as well as its central spire and angel Moroni statue. These elements were chosen for their symbolic significance and alignment with temple traditions.

The interior features art glass windows centered around motifs of apple blossoms, leafy vines, and wheat stalks, designed to honor the region's agricultural history. The temple’s interior is also decorated with numerous artworks, including nineteen original pieces.

The temple includes three instruction rooms, seven sealing rooms, and a baptistry, each designed for ceremonial use.

The design uses symbolic elements representing the heritage of the region, to provide deeper spiritual meaning to the temple's appearance and function. Symbolism is important to church members and include the apple blossom motif found in the art glass windows, representing Payson's apple orchards.

== Temple presidents ==
The church's temples are directed by a temple president and matron, each serving for a term of three years. The president and matron oversee the administration of temple operations and provide guidance and training for both temple patrons and staff.

Serving from 2015 to 2018, the first president of the Payson Utah Temple was William B. Sonne, with Elizabeth K. Sonne as matron. As of 2024, Lynn A. Gilbert is the president, with Cindy L. Gilbert serving as matron.

== Admittance ==
On April 21, 2015, the church announced the public open house that was held from April 24-May 23, 2015 (excluding Sundays). The temple was dedicated by Henry B. Eyring on June 7, 2015, in three sessions.

Like all the church's temples, it is not used for Sunday worship services. To members of the church, temples are regarded as sacred houses of the Lord. Once dedicated, only church members with a current temple recommend can enter for worship.

== See also ==
Temples in Utah
Wasatch Front Temples
Temples along the Wasatch Front
- = Operating
- = Under construction
- = Announced
- = Temporarily Closed

- The Church of Jesus Christ of Latter-day Saints in Utah
- Comparison of temples (LDS Church)
- List of temples (LDS Church)
- List of temples by geographic region (LDS Church)
- Temple architecture (LDS Church)
