= Horace S. Eldredge =

American politician

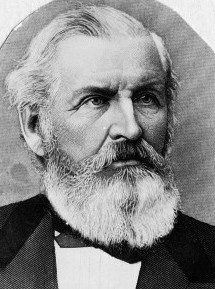

First Seven Presidents of the Seventy
- October 7, 1854 – September 6, 1888
- Called by: Brigham Young

Personal details
- Born: Horace Sunderlin Eldredge; February 6, 1816; Brutus, New York, United States
- Died: September 6, 1888 (aged 72); Salt Lake City, Utah Territory, United States
- Signature
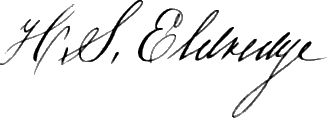

Horace Sunderlin Eldredge (February 6, 1816 – September 6, 1888) was an early leader and member of the First Seven Presidents of the Seventy in the Church of Jesus Christ of Latter Day Saints.

== Biography ==
Eldredge was born in Brutus, New York on January 6, 1816. In the summer of 1836 he was baptized and then married Betsey Ann Chase in the summer of 1837 in Buffalo, New York. Weeks after purchasing a farm in Far West, Missouri, he was expelled along with the rest of the Latter Day Saints by Missouri Executive Order 44.

Following the death of Joseph Smith, Eldredge followed the Church of Jesus Christ of Latter-day Saints to what became the Utah Territory, where he was appointed marshal of the Territory, assessor and collector of taxes and a brigadier-general of the militia. On October 7, 1854, he was appointed one of the Presidents of the Seventy, a position he held until his death. In 1856 and 1862 he served in the Utah Territorial Legislature. He was superintendent of ZCMI for several years before his death. Eldredge practiced plural marriage and fathered 28 children. He died in Salt Lake City of lung trouble.
