= Franklin D. Richards (Mormon apostle) =

Latter-day Saint Apostle

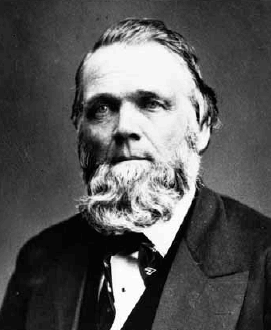

President of the Quorum of the Twelve Apostles
- September 13, 1898 – December 9, 1899
- Predecessor: Lorenzo Snow
- Successor: Brigham Young Jr.

Quorum of the Twelve Apostles
- February 12, 1849 – December 9, 1899
- Called by: Brigham Young

LDS Church Apostle
- February 12, 1849 – December 9, 1899
- Called by: Brigham Young
- Reason: Reorganization of First Presidency; excommunication of Lyman Wight
- Reorganization at end of term: Reed Smoot ordained

Personal details
- Born: Franklin Dewey Richards; April 2, 1821; Richmond, Massachusetts, United States
- Died: December 9, 1899 (aged 78); Ogden, Utah, United States
- Resting place: Ogden City Cemetery; 41.2325°N 111.9622°W
- Spouse(s): 11, including: Jane S. Richards
- Parents: Phinehas Richards; Wealthy Dewey
- Signature
Notes
Was also a member of the Council of Fifty, an official church historian, and served in the Utah Territorial Legislature (1852–1856).

Franklin Dewey Richards (April 2, 1821 – December 9, 1899) was a member of the Quorum of the Twelve Apostles of the Church of Jesus Christ of Latter-day Saints from 1849 until his death. He served as the quorum's president from 1898 until his death. He was the nephew of apostle Willard Richards, one of two men who survived the mob attack at Carthage Jail that took the lives of church founder, Joseph Smith and his brother, Hyrum.

His son, George F. Richards, and grandson, LeGrand Richards, were both members of the Quorum of the Twelve, with his son also serving as its president from 1945 to 1950. Richards also served in the Utah Territorial Legislature in 1852 and 1856.

Franklin County, Idaho, is named after Richards.

== Biography ==
Richards was born in Richmond, Massachusetts. He married Jane Snyder in Nauvoo, Illinois. After helping her and their children start on the Mormon exodus to the west in 1846, Richards and his brother, Samuel, departed on a mission to Great Britain. He served there as a missionary from 1846 to 1848, and on at least two more occasions, during the 1850s and 1860s.

=== Calling ===
Lyman Wight was excommunicated from the church in December 1848 because he refused to join the church in the Salt Lake Valley. This left an opening in the Quorum of the Twelve. To fill the vacancy, and to bring the number of the quorum up to twelve, Richards was called and ordained as the fourth of four apostles on February 12, 1849. The other three apostles were Charles C. Rich, Lorenzo Snow, and Erastus Snow. A short time after his call to the Twelve, Richards went to England, where he served as the president of both the British and the European missions. In these positions, Richards also served as editor of the Millennial Star and as director of the Perpetual Emigrating Fund's operations in Europe. He helped compile the documents that are now part of the Pearl of Great Price while serving as a mission president.

From 1889 until his death, Richards was the church's twelfth official Church Historian.

=== President of the Quorum of the Twelve Apostles ===
When Wilford Woodruff died on September 2, 1898, Lorenzo Snow succeeded him as church president. As the second apostle in seniority, Richards became the President of the Quorum of the Twelve. His term ended when he died fifteen months later. He was a member of the Quorum of the Twelve for more than 50 years, the longest tenure of any person who did not become the church's president.

=== Death ===
Richards suffered a stroke and paralysis in the autumn of 1899. He died peacefully in his home in Ogden, Utah, on December 9, 1899.

The vacancy in the quorum created by his death was filled by Reed Smoot.

== Family ==
The Richards family is only the third Latter-day Saint family in history with three consecutive generations in the Quorum of the Twelve Apostles, with his son, George F. Richards, and grandson, LeGrand Richards, also serving as church apostles.

Another grandson, Franklin D. Richards became a church general authority, serving as an Assistant to the Quorum of the Twelve and later as a member of the Presidency of the Seventy.

A daughter of Richards, Josephine Richards West, was a counselor in the general presidency of the Primary Association.

Another descendant, Kent F. Richards, also served as a general authority seventy and transcribed the collection of journals created by Franklin D. Richards.

The Church of Jesus Christ of Latter-day Saints titles
Preceded by Lorenzo Snow	President of the Quorum of the Twelve Apostles; September 13, 1898 – December 9, 1899	Succeeded by Brigham Young Jr.
Preceded by Erastus Snow	Quorum of the Twelve Apostles; February 12, 1849 – December 9, 1899	Succeeded by George Q. Cannon
