= William H. Dame =

American politician (1819–1884)

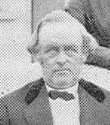

Military career
- Rank: Colonel
- Commanded: Mountain Meadows Massacre

Personal details
- Born: William Horne Dame; July 1819; Farmington, New Hampshire
- Died: August 1884 (aged 65)
- Occupation: Military commander; politician
- Parents: Jeremiah Dame (father); Susan Horne Dame (mother)

Colonel William Horne Dame (July 1819 – August 1884) was an American politician and Mormon military commander. He was one of the perpetrators of the Mountain Meadows Massacre.

== Biography ==
William Horne Dame was born in July 1819 in Farmington, New Hampshire to Jeremiah and Susan Horne Dame. In 1841, he was baptized into The Church of Jesus Christ of Latter-day Saints.

Dame served as mayor of Parowan, Utah. He was a colonel, and controlled the military in Iron County, Utah. He was also a stake president of Parowan, Utah for the Church of Jesus Christ of Latter-day Saints, alongside Isaac C. Haight. They were also both commanders of the Nauvoo Legion along with John D. Lee. In 1854, Dame and Haight said that they received a patriarchal blessing to massacre the Native Americans as redemption of Zion. During the Mountain Meadows Massacre, he ordered the women to be stripped, which they were. Dame was acquitted of his charges.

Dame served as a member of the territorial council for the 4th and 6th Utah Territorial Legislature in 1854 and 1856.

Dame died of paralysis in August 1884, aged 65.
