= Perpetual Emigration Fund =

LDS Church emigration program

The Perpetual Emigration Fund (PEF) was a 19th-century program of the Church of Jesus Christ of Latter-day Saints (LDS Church) that provided economic assistance to emigrants seeking to join the main church community in the Salt Lake Valley and surrounding regions. The fund concept was launched in 1849, two years after the first Mormon pioneers arrived in Utah. In September 1850, based on proposals made in the church's general conference, the provisional government of the State of Deseret formally incorporated the fund as the Perpetual Emigrating Company. Ultimately the fund and corporation operated under the name Perpetual Emigrating Fund Company (PEFC).

== Fund practices and operations ==
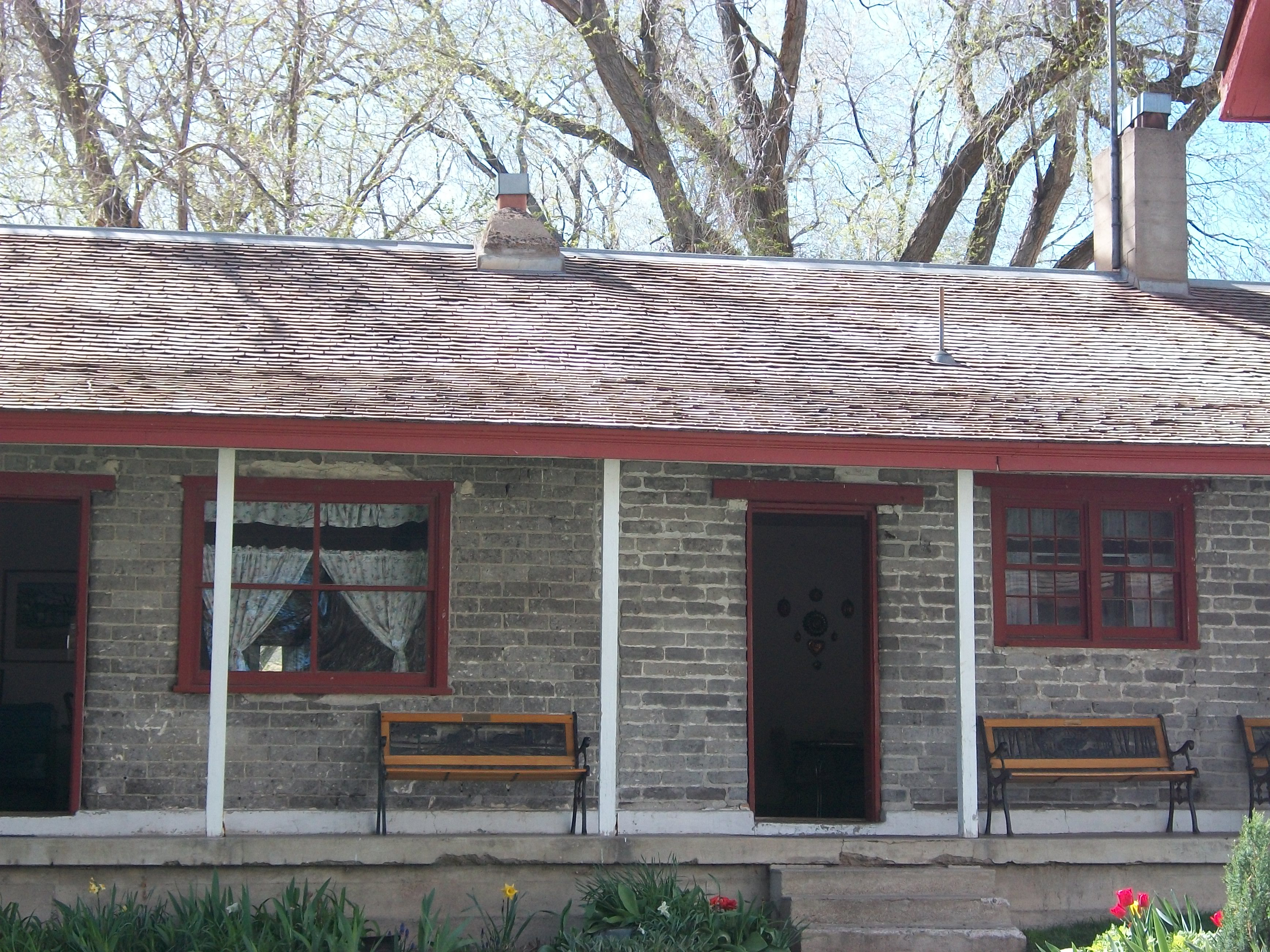
Parts of the historic ranch house on Antelope Island date to when the ranch served to help support the PEF

The PEF used a combination of church resources and private contributions to provide initial aid for impoverished church members as they moved west. The ordinance incorporating the PEF set aside Antelope Island and Stansbury Island, two islands in the Great Salt Lake, for the company's exclusive use. On Antelope Island, the church operated a ranch with tithing herds of cattle and sheep in order to generate revenue for the fund.

The aid provided to emigrants was structured in the form of loans, with the design of constantly replenishing the fund by having these members repay the assistance once established in their new homes. Recipients would sign a promissory note to reimburse the company for their costs, and were often permitted to satisfy their obligation with commodities or labor in addition to cash. Over the life of the program, nearly 30,000 individuals received assistance, primarily with travel arrangements and outfitting.

As the funding was never able to support all who might need assistance, priority was given to longstanding church members and those with useful skills needed in the Western frontier environment. While proselyting efforts in Europe led to increasing numbers of new converts drawing on the PEF, the company only sometimes paid for a recipient's ship passage; more often it assisted with overland travel costs for those already residing or newly arrived in the US. In the Utah economy, availability of cash remained a limiting factor. For members seeking to emigrate from Great Britain, church mission president Samuel W. Richards instituted a plan that the emigrants would pool their existing if meager resources into the PEF, then pay back the full amount of assistance regardless of whether they had also donated. As not all could be accommodated at once, this would help the earlier group of emigrants support those coming after. The earlier growth of the LDS Church in Britain meant that a higher percentage of British members received PEF assistance than emigrants coming from elsewhere (primarily Scandinavia). Those who had relatives already in Utah were more likely to receive support, and donors to the PEF could also designate recipients with their contribution.

== Innovations and evolution of emigrant travel ==
Efforts to ease the journey for the emigrants and make the program less expensive for them and the church continued over the PEF's lifetime. Initially the emigration route followed a pattern from when the church was headquartered at Nauvoo, Illinois, traveling almost entirely by ship, usually to land at New Orleans and then take river steamboats up the Mississippi. Alternatives were sought, however, when this route became perceived as unhealthy with the arrival of cholera outbreaks in the late 1840s. At one point, church leadership believed that members in Europe should be advised to wait until a potential canal was built through Panama or Nicaragua, so they could land in California and avoid the difficult overland journey to Utah from the east. However, as the canal projects failed to move forward, this approach to the voyage never developed. By 1854, church President Brigham Young was directing Franklin D. Richards, who had taken over from his brother Samuel leading the church in Britain, to send emigrants to Atlantic seaboard ports instead, there to taken trains as far west as they could go before joining wagon companies the rest of the way.

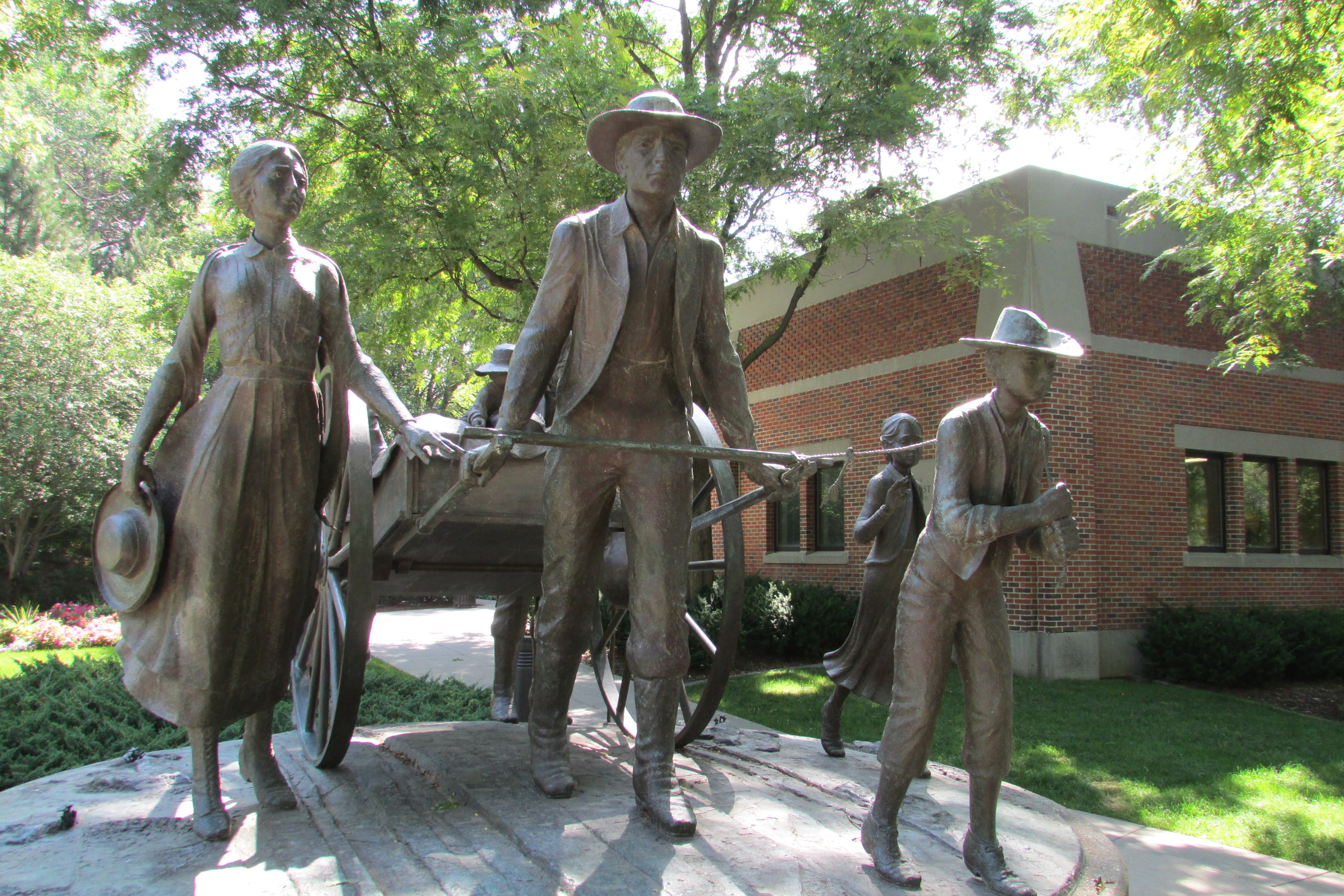
Statue of handcart pioneers, Mormon Trail Center, Omaha, Nebraska

Beginning in 1856, instead of supplying covered wagons with oxen to cross the plains from the western railroad terminus, church leaders organized many emigrants into handcart companies provided with two-wheeled carts that they would pull themselves, like a very large wheelbarrow. The new approach allowed the PEF to support nearly twice as many individuals as it had in 1855. The increased numbers were also problematic, however, as procuring the additional ships and difficulties in building sufficient handcarts caused travel delays. This led to two companies starting the handcart stage of their journey too late in the year, with significant loss of life when they were caught in an October blizzard before reaching Salt Lake City.

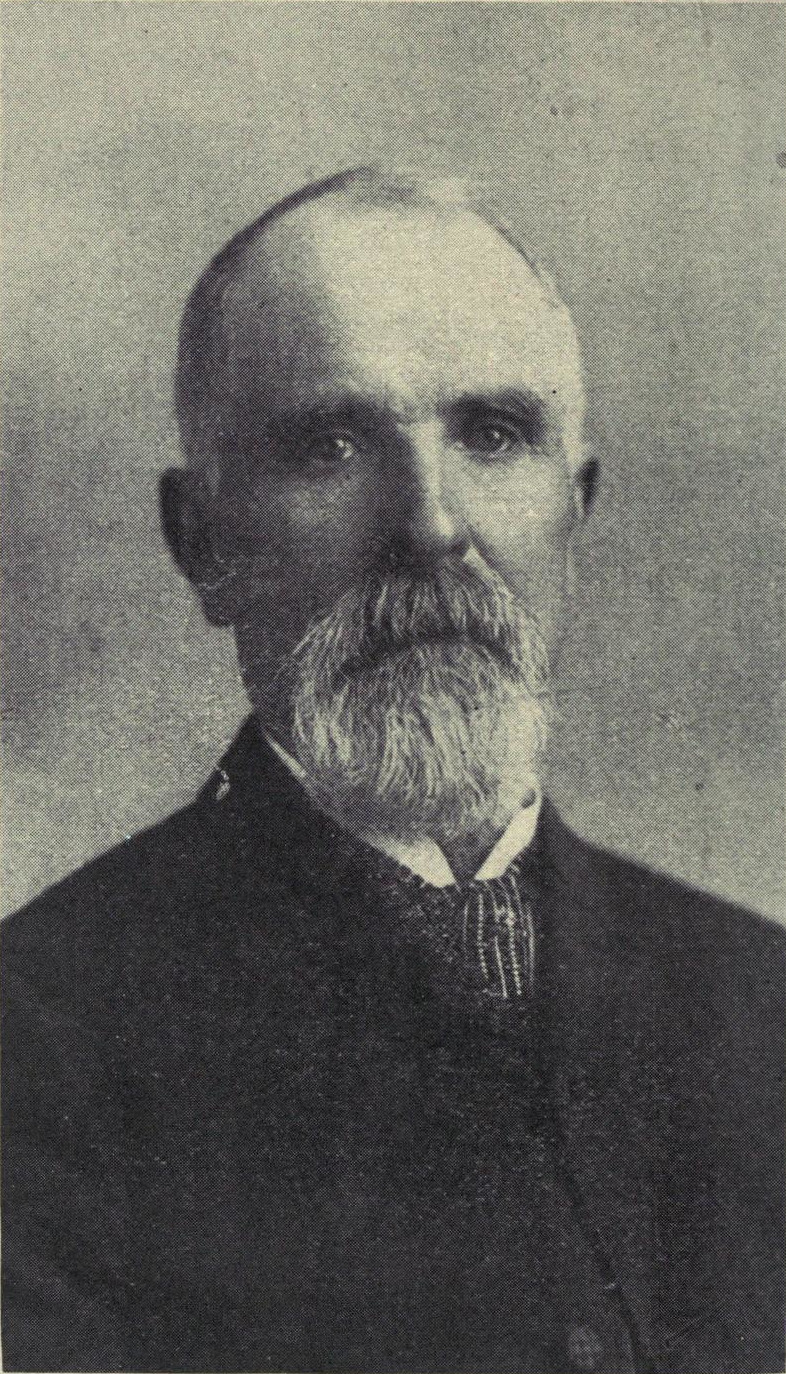
John R. Murdock led multiple down-and-back companies in the 1860s

A few more handcart companies followed in subsequent years, the last in 1860 as the final emigration stage reverted to wagon trains. Instead, Brigham Young began promoting the idea of sending teams from Utah with cattle and wagons to meet the emigrants across the plains. By drawing on available resources, it would reduce the challenges and costs of outfitting each group separately, and the wagons could carry the necessary gear and supplies while the majority of travelers walked alongside. Young also suggested that with Utah still having few merchants, existing residents might arrange to have team leaders obtain goods for them back East and bring those items back more cheaply than they could otherwise be obtained. These teams became known as "down-and-back companies" based on their journey "down" to the Missouri River gathering point and back to Utah, and contributed significantly in facilitating the larger emigrant groups organized through the PEF over the course of the decade.

For those coming from Europe, the place of departure was typically Liverpool, except for a handful of parties from the continent who sailed to America directly from Hamburg. Church agents engaged sailing vessels almost exclusively for the transatlantic crossing until 1868, to keep fares as low as possible (whether paid by the individual or the PEF). By this time, the majority of overseas immigration to the US had already shifted to steamships, and the church followed suit in developing a relationship with the Guion Line to carry its emigrants as steerage passengers. The shift to a quicker, more reliable crossing by steam was in part connected to a separate concession from the Union Pacific Railroad, which offered free railroad fare from Omaha for able-bodied men who could help build the roadbed for its portion of the first transcontinental railroad. The railroad's completion the next year also eliminated the wagon stage of the journey.

== Final years and legacy ==
Since repayment depended on the recipients building up sufficient means after emigration, the PEFC often did not collect on the notes it held. President Young and others occasionally issued harsh criticism of those who failed to repay, or at least return the gear with which they had been outfitted. However, church bishops who oversaw PEF repayments were directed that collection should be "consistent with the ability of the debtors to pay, without distressing the poor, the widow, the aged, or the infirm." As the company continued to balance these competing considerations, by 1880 the amounts owed to the PEF had grown to $1.6 million. As part of the jubilee celebration of the 50th year since the church's organization, its soon-to-be President John Taylor announced a goal to forgive half the amount. With instructions to identify those too poor to pay, church bishops managed in the end to forgive $337,000 of obligations to the PEF during the year.

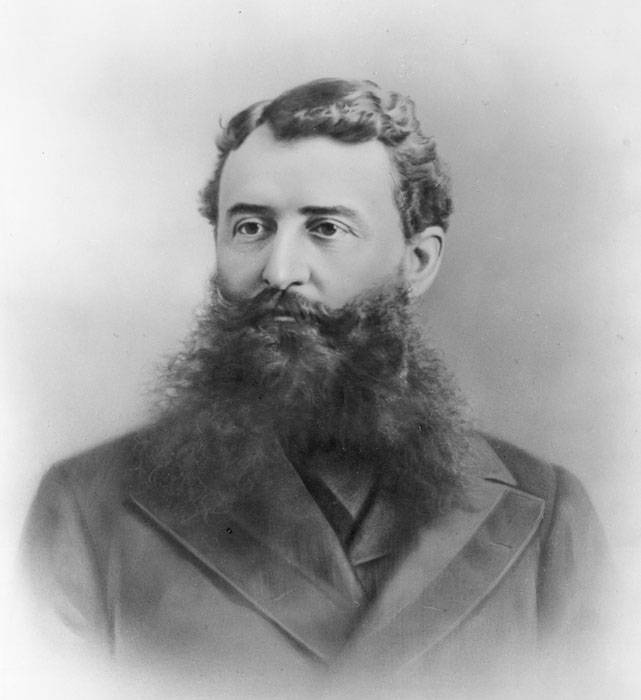
Governor Eli Murray lobbied the federal government to have the PEFC dissolved

As the US federal government stepped up its campaign to suppress the practice of polygamy by the church, the PEFC came under collateral attack. Utah territorial Governor Eli H. Murray complained to the Secretary of the Interior in 1883 that the PEFC's incorporation meant the legislature had effectively handed over to the church the entire system of immigration into the territory. Subsequent sessions of Congress repeatedly considered bills to disincorporate both the LDS Church and the Perpetual Emigrating Fund Company on the grounds that it fostered the practice. The disincorporation finally took effect when the Edmunds-Tucker Act was enacted in 1887.

The church was ultimately allowed to continue operating and its assets were released in 1893 after a manifesto officially discontinuing the practice of polygamy, but the PEFC was never reinstated. At the conclusion of court proceedings to dissolve it, the receiver took possession of $417,968.50 in net assets, nearly all uncollectable promissory notes of no value. In 2001 the LDS Church established a new program inspired by the Perpetual Emigration Fund, this time designed to help members in developing countries obtain vocational and technical training, and named it the Perpetual Education Fund.
