= Chi Hong (Sam) Wong =

Hong Kong Latter-day Saint leader

First Quorum of the Seventy
- 5 April 2014 –
- Called by: Thomas S. Monson

Personal details
- Born: Chi Hong Wong; 25 May 1962 (age 63); Hong Kong
- Spouse(s): Carol Lu
- Children: 4

Chi Hong (Sam) Wong (born 25 May 1962) has been a general authority of the Church of Jesus Christ of Latter-day Saints (LDS Church) since April 2014. He is a member of the First Quorum of the Seventy.

Wong was born in British Hong Kong to Ngan Kan and Fat Wong. His future wife introduced him to the LDS Church and he became a member in 1982. In 1983, Wong moved to Oahu and attended Brigham Young University–Hawaii, obtaining degrees in accounting and computer science. Wong then returned to Hong Kong, where he founded a business and quality consulting company. He later received an MBA from the Open University of Hong Kong.

In the LDS Church, Wong has also served as a bishop, stake president, and area seventy. He became a general authority during the church's April 2014 general conference. He served as a counselor in the presidency of the church's Asia Area from August 2014 to August 2020, when he was assigned to serve as a counselor in the North America Central Area.

In the October 2014 general conference, Wong delivered a sermon in Cantonese, becoming the first speaker to give a general conference address in a language other than English. Prior to the conference, the LDS Church had announced a new policy of allowing conference speakers to give addresses in their native languages. Since August 2019, Wong has been serving in the church's North America Central Area, initially as first counselor and then since August 2022 as president. He has also served as an assistant executive director of the church's Family History and Temple departments.

In 1983, Wong married Carol Lu and they have four children.
