= For the Strength of Youth (magazine) =

LDS magazine for teenagers

For the Strength of Youth is one of the official magazines of The Church of Jesus Christ of Latter-day Saints (LDS Church). Conceived as a replacement for the New Era magazine, it is published monthly since January 2021 and focuses on articles for teenage members of the church, which can subscribe to it for free.
