= Thomas Grover =

American politician

Thomas Grover III
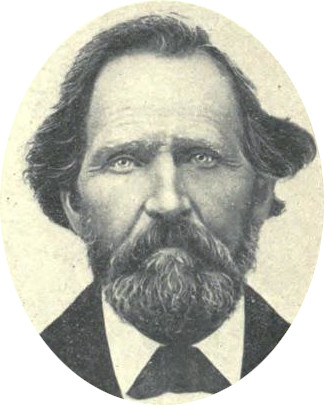

Personal details
- Born: 22 July 1807; Whitehall, New York, U.S.
- Died: 20 February 1886 (aged 78); Farmington, Utah Territory, U.S.
- Resting place: Farmington City Cemetery
- Spouse(s): 8
- Children: 52 (23 of which died in childhood)
- Parents: Thomas Grover and Polly Spaulding

Thomas Grover (July 22, 1807 – February 20, 1886) was an early leader in the Church of Jesus Christ of Latter-day Saints. He was a polygamist, a Utah politician, and a Mormon pioneer.

== Biography ==
Grover was born on July 22, 1807, to Thomas Grover and Polly Spaulding in Whitehall, New York. At age 12, he worked as a cabin boy on the Erie Canal, where he would eventually become a captain. In 1828, he married his first wife, Caroline Whiting, with whom he had seven daughters.

In September 1834, Grover joined the Church of Jesus Christ of Latter-day Saints, being baptized by Warren A. Cowdery. After joining the church, he and his family moved to Kirtland, Ohio, to join the main body of Latter Day Saints.

Grover moved his family from Kirtland to Far West, Missouri. After Governor Lilburn Boggs issued an order for Mormons to be exterminated from Missouri, Grover and his family fled to Nauvoo, Illinois. Along the way, Caroline became ill. She died on October 17, 1840. That same month, Grover and Caroline's infant daughter Emma died. At age 33, Grover became a widower with five young children to care for. While in Nauvoo, Grover farmed for a living. He was also a bodyguard to Joseph Smith and a captain in the Nauvoo Legion.

In 1841, Grover was called to be a member of the presiding high council of the church in a revelation that now appears in the Doctrine and Covenants. That same year, he began practicing plural marriage, marrying his second wife, Caroline Eliza Nickerson Hubbard, on February 20, 1841. He later married Hannah Tupper, Laduska Tupper, Emma Walker, and Elizabeth Walker as well. He had two children with Caroline Hubbard and two sons with Hannah Tupper.

From 1840 to 1844, Grover served three missions for the church in New York, Michigan, and Upper Canada. He returned to Nauvoo just after the death of Joseph Smith.

Grover was a captain in Brigham Young's vanguard company of 1847 which lead the way for thousands of Mormon pioneers emigrating west. One of his jobs was butcher. At the Platte River, Grover constructed and managed a ferry that would be used by thousands of emigrants. He arrived in the Salt Lake Valley on October 2, 1847.

Once in Utah Territory, Grover helped settle the area that is now Centerville and Farmington. He was a member of the Territorial Legislature and a Probate Judge in Davis County, Utah. He died on February 20, 1886, at the age of 78.
