= Samuel W. Richards =

American politician

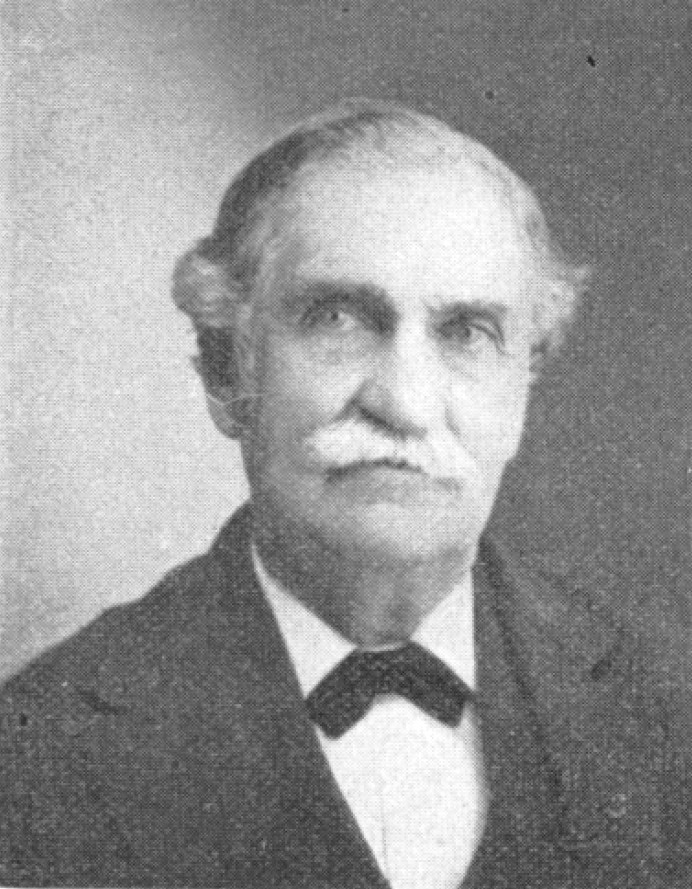

Member of the Utah Territorial Legislature

In office
- 1855 – 1859

Personal details
- Born: Samuel Whitney Richards; August 9, 1824; Richmond, Massachusetts, United States
- Died: November 26, 1909 (aged 85); Salt Lake City, Utah, United States
- Resting place: Salt Lake City Cemetery; 40.777°N 111.858°W
- Spouse(s): Mary Heskin Parker; Mary A. Parker; Helena L. Robinson; Jane E. Mayer; Ann Jones; Elizabeth Whitaker
- Parents: Phinehas Richards; Wealthy Dewey
- Signature

Samuel Whitney Richards (August 9, 1824 – November 26, 1909) was a religious and political leader in 19th-century Utah Territory and in the Church of Jesus Christ of Latter-day Saints (LDS Church).

== Early years ==
Richards was the son of Phinehas Richards and his wife Wealthy Dewey. He was born in Richmond, Massachusetts. He joined the LDS Church at age 14 shortly after his father was baptized. At age 18 he worked on building a railroad in the vicinity of Richmond, having learned the carpenter's trade from his father. He moved with his family to Nauvoo, Illinois which is where he met his first wife, Mary Haskin Parker.

Richards worked on the building of the Nauvoo Temple, especially in joining. After ordinance work began in the temple he served as an ordinance worker. He married Parker in the Nauvoo Temple in January 1846. Parker had joined the church in England, with Willard Richards, Samuel's uncle, having been one of the missionaries involved in teaching her about Mormonism. She had earlier, until she was ten, attended a school taught by Jeanetta Richards, whose father was the minister of the Congregationalist church Mary and her family belonged to before joining the LDS Church. Jeanetta later married Willard, creating even more connection between Mary and the Richards family even before she married Samuel.

== Mission ==
Samuel left on a mission to Great Britain in May 1846 while Mary traveled with Samuel's parents and lived in various locations in western Iowa and eastern Nebraska. On his mission, Samuel served as president of the Scottish Conference. He returned in 1848. For a year Samuel and Mary lived in modern Fremont County, Iowa along the banks of the Nioshoba River on a farm Samuel had rented. This area was at the time claimed by and administered by Missouri.

== Utah ==
In 1849 Richards, along with his wife and an infant daughter, went to Utah Territory in a wagon company headed by Silas Richards. Upon reaching Utah, Richards worked as a farmer and served as a member of both the Salt Lake City Council and the State of Deseret Constitutional Convention. He was also a member of the board of directors of the University of Deseret.

== Great Britain ==
From 1851 to 1854, Richards again served a mission in Great Britain. For much of this time he served as president of the British Mission (succeeding his brother, Franklin D. Richards) and editor of the Millennial Star. He also oversaw the Perpetual Emigration Fund operations in Europe.

== Marriage ==
In 1855, Richards married his first plural wife, Mary Ann Parker, who was the niece of his first wife Mary Haskin Parker. Mary Haskin Parker was the daughter of John Parker Sr., while Mary Ann Parker was the daughter of John Parker Jr. Richards later married four additional wives and had a total of 19 children. Two of his five wives were widows with whom he did not have any children. One of these was Elizabeth Whitaker, the widow of John Caine.

== Utah Territory ==
From 1855 to 1859, Richards served as a member of the Utah Territorial Legislature. In 1857, he was sent on a short mission to England to call missionaries home to protect their families from Johnston's Army. He also conducted espionage on Johnson's Army and delivered communications from Brigham Young to Thomas L. Kane to pass on to James Buchanan as part of this journey. In 1856, Richards had been accepted to practice law before the Supreme Court of Utah.

In 1860, Richards' first wife, Mary Haskin Parker, died. Only three of her six children outlived her, and they were raised by their cousin and stepmother, Mary Ann Parker Richards. Mary Ann was Richards' youngest wife. When he served as president of the Eastern States Mission from 1895 to 1897, she accompanied him. By that point she was his only living wife. In addition to raising her aunt's three children, Mary Ann had ten children of her own.

== Judge ==
In 1861, Richards was appointed Probate Judge of Davis County, Utah. He also served several more terms on the Salt Lake City Council. In 1871 and 1872 Richards served as a missionary in Massachusetts. He also did decorative work on the interior of the Salt Lake Temple; however, in Utah he was generally more involved in farming and milling than in carpentry.

He died at his home in Salt Lake City on November 26, 1909.

== Sources ==
- Carr, Maurine Ward. Introductory and biographical chapters in Winter Quarters: The 1846-1848 Life Writings of Mary Haskin Parker Richards. Logan: Utah State University Press, 1996.
- Frederick S. Buchanan. "From the Missouri to the Clyde: Samuel W. Richards in Scotland"
- roster of the Utah Territorial Legislature
- Orson F. Whitney. History of Utah: biographical
- Jenson, Andrew (1901). Latter-day Saint biographical encyclopedia: A compilation of biographical sketches of prominent men and women in the Church of Jesus Christ of Latter-Day Saints. Vol. 1. Salt Lake City, Utah: The Andrew Jenson History Company (Printed by The Deseret News Press). pp. 718 & 719.
