= Levi E. Young =

Latter-day Saint mission president and seventy

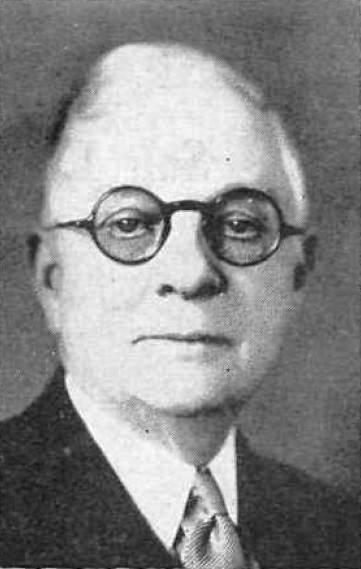

First Council of the Seventy
- October 6, 1909 – December 13, 1963
- Called by: Joseph F. Smith

Personal details
- Born: Levi Edgar Young; February 2, 1874; Salt Lake City, Utah Territory, United States
- Died: December 13, 1963 (aged 89); Salt Lake City, Utah, United States
- Spouse(s): Valeria Brinton Young

Levi Edgar Young (February 2, 1874 – December 13, 1963) was a general authority of the Church of Jesus Christ of Latter-day Saints (LDS Church). He was one of the seven presidents of the Seventy from 1909 until his death. He has been associated with the release of the 1832 account of Joseph Smith's First Vision, which was previously not widely known. Aside from his service in the Seventy, Young served as president of various LDS Church missions. Young received a master's degree from Columbia University in history and was a professor of history at the University of Utah.

== Biography ==
Levi Edgar Young was born in Salt Lake City, Utah Territory on February 2, 1874, the son of LDS Church general authority Seymour B. Young and Elizabeth Riter. and grandson of Joseph Young. Levi Young graduated from the University of Utah in 1895, and later became a faculty member at the same school, teaching history. He also taught at the Lowell school in Salt Lake City and LDS College. Later in his life, he studied at Harvard University with professors Albert Bushnell Hart, Edward Channing, and Ephraim Emerton. Young earned a M.A. in history from Columbia University in 1910. Young served as the dean of the Department of Western History at the University of Utah for ten years. In 1936 he was promoted to head of the political science department as well. He published more than 24 historical articles and five books, including Chief Episodes in the History of Utah and The Founding of Utah. Young was ordained as a Seventy on June 18, 1897.

From 1901 to 1904, Young served as a Mormon missionary in Germany, Austria, and Switzerland. For the last two years of his mission, he was the president of the Swiss–Austrian Mission of the church. Upon his return from Germany, he married Valeria Brinton in 1907 with whom he had three children. When George Reynolds died in 1909, Young was selected to take his place in the First Council of the Seventy. From 1913 to 1929 he served on the general board of the Young Men's Mutual Improvement Association. He presided over the Temple Square Mission from 1922 to 1934. In 1939, he was appointed president of the New England States Mission, a position he held for three years.

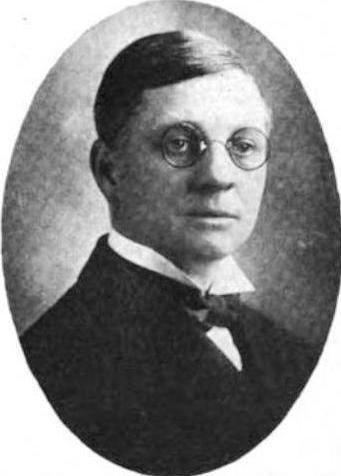
Young ca. 1920

In 1939, Young retired from the University of Utah. He presided over organizations such as the Pacific Coast branch of the American Historical Association, the Utah State Historical Association, and the Sons of the American Revolution. He was also a member of various organizations including the American Ethnological Society, the American Academy of Political and Social Science, the Sigma Chi Fraternity, the Authors Club of London, and the Royal Society of Edinburgh. Young became the senior president of the Seventy of the LDS Church in 1941 and continued in that position until his death. He died in Salt Lake City, Utah in 1963 at the age of eighty-nine. After his death, the Relief Society Magazine stated, "President Young has left a resplendent heritage of faith and good works to his family and to the Church." Of his life spent in both clerical and academic pursuits, J. Golden Kimball, in good humor, said of Young: "That little shrimp. He goes around here carrying water on both shoulders, and he's afraid to lean one way or the other for fear of spilling some of it."

== First vision account ==
Young may have publicized the existence of the 1832 account of Joseph Smith's first vision, a major historical document in the LDS Church. The 1832 account was the first account and the only one written in Smith's handwriting. It differs from the other accounts because it emphasizes personal forgiveness and does not mention seeing God the Father. Additionally, it does not mention being bound by Satan or Smith's mission of restoration.

While recounting an interview with Young after his death, LaMar Petersen, an amateur Mormon historian, mentioned that Young had recounted of a "strange account" of the first vision that was kept, separate from its original book from which it had been excised, in the Church historian's office. That office was Joseph Fielding Smith's, who at the time of the recounting had ascended to the position president in the LDS Church. Smith denied access to the original documents to Jerald and Sandra Tanner, a pair prominent of Mormon critics, historians, and apostates. However, he granted access to Paul R. Cheeseman, a graduate student at Brigham Young University. The Joseph Smith Papers project confirms that the pages related to the account were later returned to the original letterbook.
