= Valeria Brinton Young =

American politician (1875–1968)

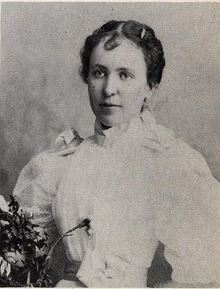
- Valeria Brinton Young, 1895
- Born: Valeria Erepta Brinton; December 13, 1875; Cottonwood, Utah
- Died: October 22, 1968 (aged 92)
- Education: University of Utah
- Occupations: Educator, Politician
- Spouse: Levi Edgar Young (m. 1907–1963) his death

Valeria Erepta Brinton Young (December 13, 1875 - October 22, 1968) was an American educator, president of the Women of the University of Utah.

== Early life ==
Valeria Erepta Brinton was born on December 13, 1875, in Cottonwood, Utah, the daughter of LDS Bishop David Branson Brinton (1850–1929) and Susan Erepta Huffaker (1854–1916).

Brinton attended the University of Utah, graduating as valedictorian in June 1895.

== Career ==
On April 1, 1927, Valeria Brinton Young was elected a member of the State Board of Health and Vital Statistics. She was also secretary of the Utah Anti-Tuberculosis Society.

Young was president of Women of the University of Utah and a member of the Executive Board of the State Federation of Women's Clubs. She was president of the Author's Club and of the Mission Relief Society Organization.

Young was a member of: Service Star Legion, Republican Women's Club, League of Women Voters, Ensign Club, the Young Ladies' Mutual Improvement Association.

President of the Women's State Legislative Council of Utah 1929 to 1933

== Personal life ==
On June 12, 1907, Valeria Brinton married Levi Edgar Young (1874–1963), the son of Seymour B. Young and one of the first seven presidents of Seventies. They had 3 children: Harriet Wollerton (1909-2006, later Kline), Jane Seymour (1911-2004, later Rawson), Eleanor Brinton (1913-2008, later Van Orden).

Young lived at 555 East South Temple, Salt Lake City, Utah.

In 1910, the family moved temporarily to New York City, to allow Levi Young to study at Columbia University for his master's degree in history.

Young died on October 22, 1968, and is buried at Wasatch Lawn Memorial Park, Salt Lake City.

== Gallery ==
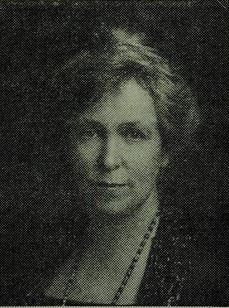
Valeria Brinton Young, 1943

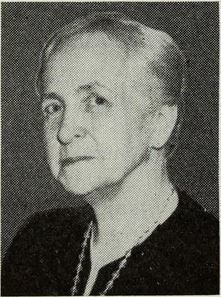
Valeria Brinton Young, 1956

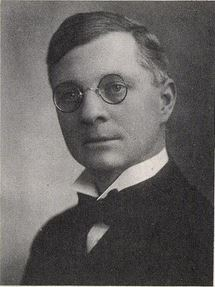
Levi Edgar Young, ca. 1907

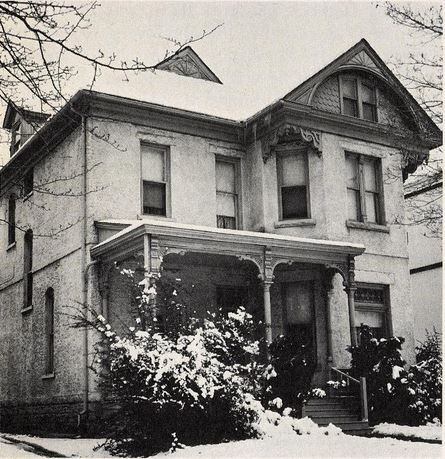
555 East South Temple
