= Quentin Cook =

Quentin Cook may refer to:

- Fatboy Slim (born Quentin Cook in 1963), British recording artist
- Quentin L. Cook (born 1940), American leader in The Church of Jesus Christ of Latter-day Saints
