= S. Dilworth Young =

American religious leader

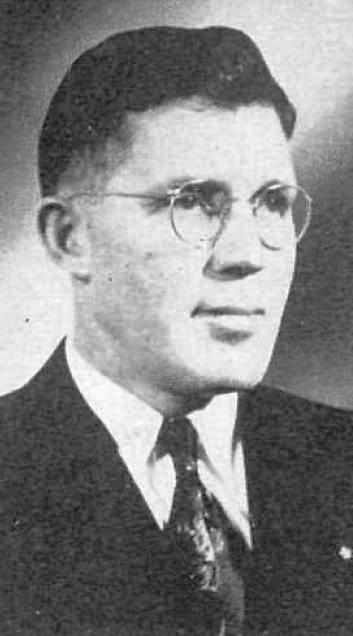

Emeritus General Authority
- September 30, 1978 – July 9, 1981

First Quorum of the Seventy
- October 3, 1975 – September 30, 1978
- End reason: Granted general authority emeritus status

First Council of the Seventy
- April 6, 1945 – October 1, 1976
- End reason: Honorable release

Personal details
- Born: Seymour Dilworth Young; September 7, 1897; Salt Lake City, Utah, United States
- Died: July 9, 1981 (aged 83); Salt Lake City, Utah, United States

Seymour Dilworth Young (September 7, 1897 – July 9, 1981) was a general authority of the Church of Jesus Christ of Latter-day Saints (LDS Church) from 1945 until his death.

From 1945 to 1975, Young was a member of the church's First Council of the Seventy. In 1975, he was sustained a member of the newly created First Quorum of Seventy. He was the senior president of the Seventy from 1967 to 1976.

Young was a graduate of Weber College (now Weber State University). He served in the United States military during World War I. After the war he served as a missionary in the Central States Mission.

Young was known as an author and poet among members of the church. Young authored a biography of his great-great-uncle, LDS Church president Brigham Young. Many of Dilworth Young's poems have been published in the Ensign. He was born to Seymour B. Young, Jr. and Carlie Louine Clawson. Young was the grandson of Latter-day Saint leader Seymour B. Young, the nephew of Levi E. Young and the great-grandson of Joseph Young. He was also a descendant of Edward Partridge. One of Young's early American ancestors, Thomas Bascom, a founder of Windsor, Connecticut, was of French Basque and French Huguenot descent. Young married Gladys Pratt and had two children, one of whom died in World War II. Following his first wife's death, Young married Huldah Parker.

From 1947 to 1951, Young was president of the church's New England Mission.

Young is the subject of a biography by his grandson, Benson Y. Parkinson (Covenant, 1994).
