= Heber C. Kimball =

American religious leader (1801–1868)

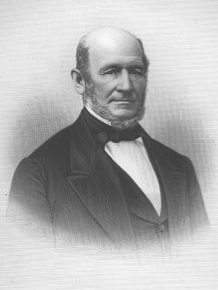

First Counselor in the First Presidency
- December 27, 1847 – June 22, 1868
- Called by: Brigham Young

Quorum of the Twelve Apostles
- February 14, 1835 – December 27, 1847
- Called by: Three Witnesses
- End reason: Called as First Counselor in the First Presidency

LDS Church Apostle
- February 14, 1835 – June 22, 1868
- Called by: Three Witnesses
- Reason: Initial organization of Quorum of the Twelve
- Reorganization at end of term: No apostles ordained

Personal details
- Born: Heber Chase Kimball; June 14, 1801; Sheldon, Vermont, U.S.
- Died: June 22, 1868 (aged 67); Salt Lake City, Utah Territory, U.S.
- Signature

Heber Chase Kimball (June 14, 1801 – June 22, 1868) was an American religious leader who was a pioneer in the early Latter Day Saint movement. He served as one of the original twelve apostles in the early Church of the Latter Day Saints, and as first counselor to Brigham Young in the First Presidency of the Church of Jesus Christ of Latter-day Saints (LDS Church) for more than two decades, from 1847 until his death.

Agreeing to take on plural marriage, then practiced by the church, Kimball eventually married 43 women, but some relationships were for caretaking. He had a total of 66 children by 17 of his wives.

== Early life ==
Heber Chase Kimball was born in Sheldon, Franklin County, Vermont, on June 14, 1801. He was a descendant of the Kimball immigrants to Massachusetts from England in 1634. He was named after judge Heber Chase, who had helped the family in their efforts to settle in the area. His father, Solomon F. Kimball, worked as a blacksmith and maintained a farm. Due to the embargo on trade with Britain preceding the War of 1812, his father lost his investments and the family moved to western New York. They settled in West Bloomfield, New York, Ontario County, around 1811.

=== Education and training ===
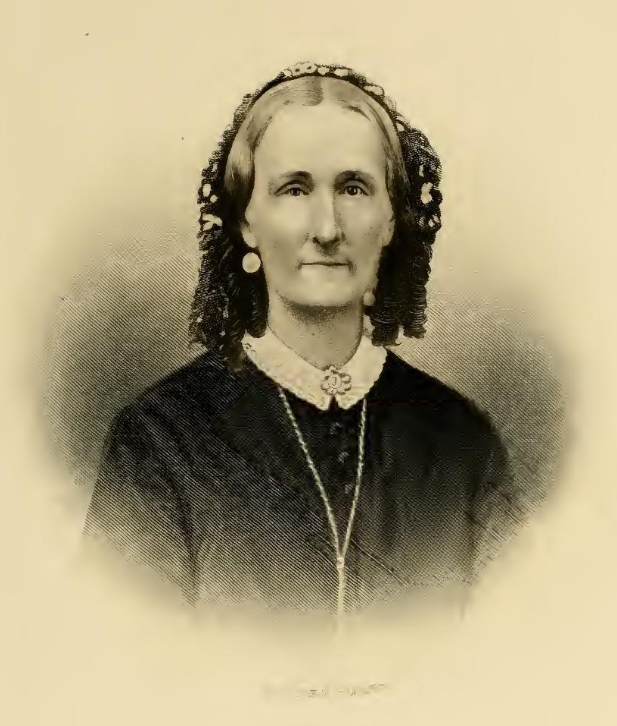
Kimball's first wife, Vilate Murray

Kimball left school at age 14, trained as a blacksmith and potter, and moved with his brother in about 1820 to Mendon, Monroe County, New York. There, he married his first wife, Vilate Murray, in November 1822.

After purchasing his brother's pottery business, for the next 10 years he carried out his trades. He acquired five and a half acres (22,000 m^{2}) of land, built a house and a barn, and planted an orchard.

=== Masonry ===
In 1823, Kimball received the three craft degrees of Freemasonry in the lodge at Victor Flats, Ontario County, New York. In 1824, he sent a petition to the chapter at Canandaigua, New York, to receive the York Rite degrees of Royal Arch Masonry. His petition was accepted, although, as he reported, Anti-Masons had burned down the chapter building in Canandaigua. Many years later, Kimball reminisced of his New York masonic experiences and stated: "I wish that all men were masons and would live up to their profession, then the world would be in a much better state than it is now."

When the Church of Jesus Christ of Latter Day Saints established itself in Nauvoo, Illinois, Kimball was one of the original petitioners to establish a Freemasonry lodge there. He served as Nauvoo Lodge U.D.'s first Junior Deacon. He remained active in Freemasonry throughout his stay in Nauvoo, but was not active once he moved to Utah Territory. There was no lodge in Utah in his lifetime that would admit Mormons.

=== Early family life ===
Several of Kimball's close family members died of tuberculosis within a few years: his mother in February 1824, his father in the spring of 1826, followed by his brother Charles C. and his brother's wife shortly thereafter.

His son William Henry was born in Mendon, April 10, 1826; he was Kimball's first child to survive infancy. His daughter Helen Mar was born August 22, 1828. She was the only daughter to survive.

=== Signs in the heavens ===
Kimball claims to have witnessed a miraculous event on September 22, 1827. According to his autobiography, he subsequently learned that it "took place the same evening that Joseph Smith received the records of the Book of Mormon from the Angel Moroni." He had seen "a white smoke" arising on the horizon, growing "clear and transparent of a bluish cast" to reveal an army on the move "in platoons":

We could see distinctly the muskets, bayonets, and knapsacks of the men, who wore caps and feathers like those used by the American soldiers in the last war with Britain; also their officers with their swords and equipage, and heard the clashing and jingling of their instruments of war and could discover the form and features of the men. The most profound order existed throughout the entire army, when the foremost man stepped, every man stepped at the same time: I could hear the step. When the front rank reached the Western horizon a battle ensued, as we could distinctly hear the report of the arms and the rush. No man could judge of my feelings when I beheld that army of men, as plainly as I ever saw armies of men in the flesh it seemed as though every hair of my head was alive. This scenery was gazed upon for hours, until it began to disappear.

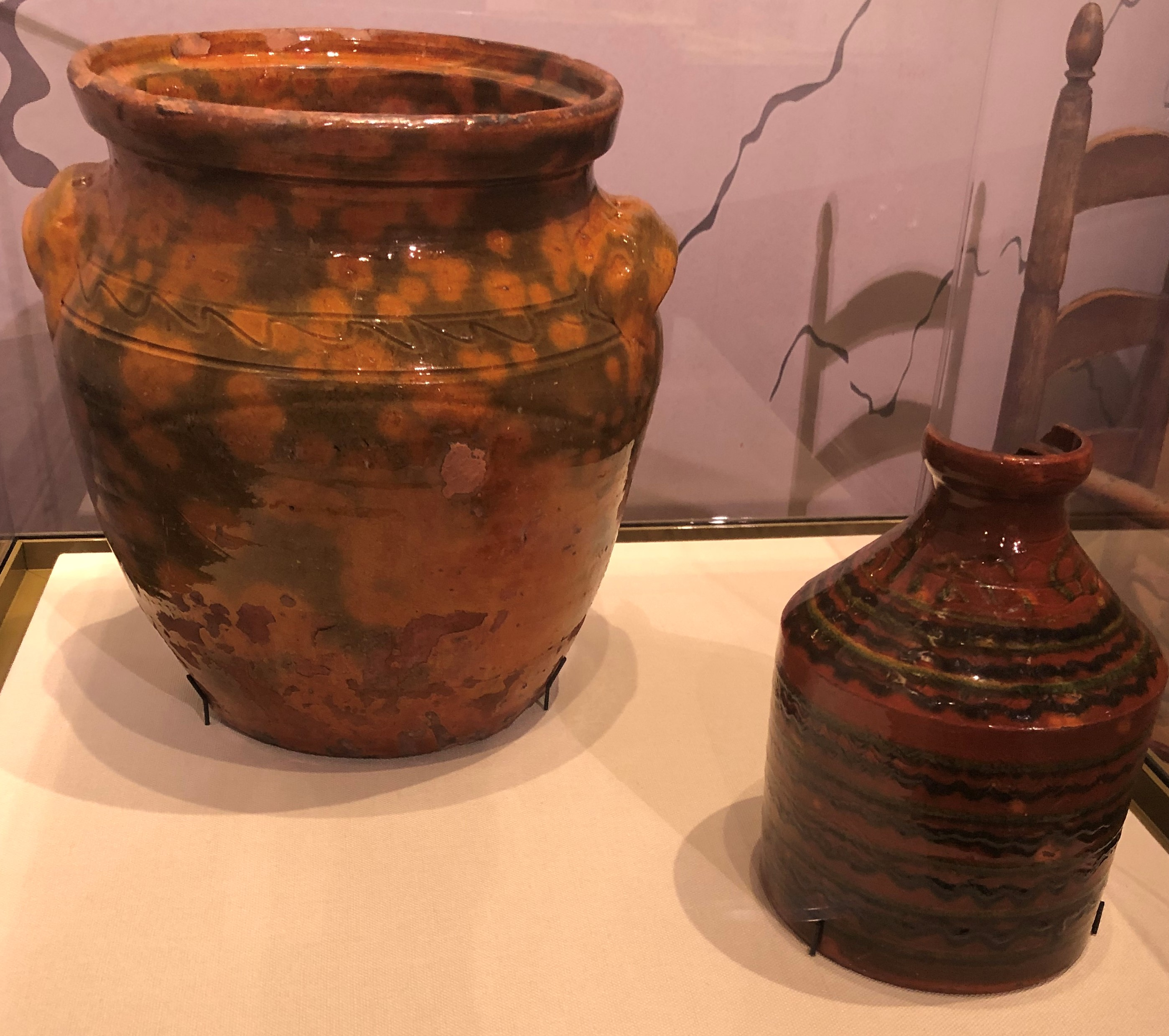
Pottery created by Kimball. He was a potter in his earlier life.

== Joining the Latter Day Saint movement ==
While in New York, Kimball joined the local Baptist Church and was eventually baptized. Three weeks later, three elders from the Church of Christ, the original name of the Latter Day Saint church founded by Joseph Smith, visited the house of his friend, Phineas Young. Kimball visited the house at this time and was impressed with church teachings. He also witnessed the speaking of tongues and the interpretation of tongues during this visit. He claims to have been visited by the power of God.

During this time, Kimball said that he and several of the Young family saw a vision opened of the "gathering of the Saints to Zion." He was inspired to travel to Pennsylvania where he could visit at length with the elders, and was accompanied by some of the Youngs. They stayed six days with the elders and witnessed more miracles, such as speaking in tongues and the interpretation of tongues.

On April 16, 1832, Kimball was baptized by Alpheus Gifford. in Mendon. Vilate Kimball followed him two weeks later. After the confirmation, the elder offered to ordain Kimball to the priesthood, but Kimball refused it as he felt he was unready. 30 more people were baptized in Mendon and formed a branch of the church there.

== Church service ==
Shortly after his baptism, Kimball was ordained an elder by Joseph Young. He began proselyting in the neighboring areas with Joseph and Brigham Young. This part of New York became known as the "burnt over district" because of the numerous religious sects that sprang up during the 19th century. The Youngs baptized many people and built up branches of the church. Kimball said that one day Ezra Landon baptized some 20 people but wanted him to confirm them. He did so, and immediately they began speaking in tongues and interpreting them.

In the fall of 1833, Kimball relocated his family to church headquarters in Kirtland, Ohio. He marched with Zion's Camp in 1834; however, after contracting cholera, he returned to Kirtland before the rest of the crew. He then attended the School of the Prophets and witnessed the completion of the Kirtland Temple. From 1832 until 1840, Kimball served eight missions for the church, requiring him to be apart from his family for months at a time.

== Quorum of the Twelve ==
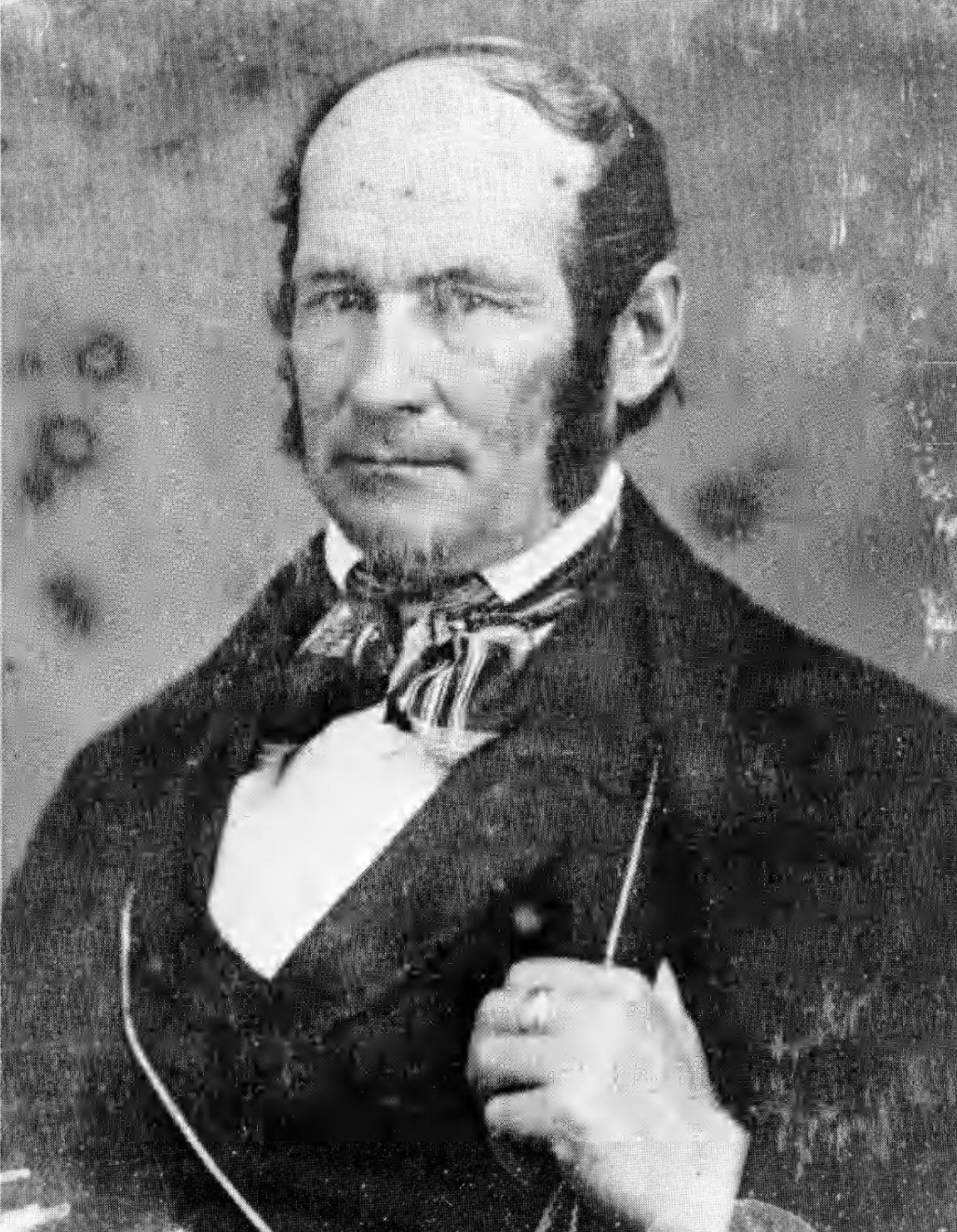

On February 14, 1835, Kimball was ordained a member of the Quorum of Twelve Apostles of the Church of the Latter Day Saints (renamed the Church of Jesus Christ of Latter Day Saints in 1838). He was one of the original twelve members of the Quorum, being 4th in seniority.

Joseph Smith called Kimball to lead a group of missionaries to England in 1837. The mission began work in Preston, Lancashire, England. This was the church's first proselyting effort in England. After the initial baptisms in Preston, the missionaries expanded their efforts to the Ribble Valley. By the time Kimball departed for the United States in 1838, about 1,500 people had been baptized.

Kimball returned with a small party to make travel arrangements for the groups and discovered the Latter Day Saints were undergoing considerable strife and pressure in the state of Missouri.

While Smith was imprisoned in the Liberty Jail, Brigham Young (now ranking leader of the Quorum) and Kimball organized the removal of approximately 12,000 Latter Day Saint refugees across the border into Illinois. There the church founded the city of Nauvoo and built a temple. Kimball served on the Nauvoo City Council.

In September 1839, Kimball left Nauvoo for another mission to England. He did not reach Indiana until October. He made stops at Kirtland to encourage the remaining Saints there to move to Nauvoo and other places and had a long layover in New York City. He sailed from New York on December 19, reaching Liverpool on April 6. Kimball spent 1840 and some of 1841 in England, initially in the area in and around Preston, and later working as a missionary in London. The missionaries began organizing groups of British converts to travel to the United States, beginning in 1840, and to join the main body of the church.

After Smith was killed in 1844, succession to the leadership of the church was a divisive issue. Young led the majority of church members across the state line into Iowa and eventually to the Salt Lake Valley. In July 1847, Kimball was one of the first Mormon pioneers to reach the valley. Kimball stood next in leadership in the Quorum to Young.

== First Presidency ==
Kimball became a member of the new First Presidency in 1847. Kimball led one of three large companies to the Salt Lake Valley in the summer of 1848. He established his families in Utah Territory (he had three wives) and supported them by farming, ranching, milling at the Heber C. Kimball Gristmill, and freighting, in addition to church responsibilities. While in the First Presidency, Kimball received special assignments to supervise the ongoing British Mission and to conduct temple ordinances. He also worked to encourage economic independence for Utah. At speaking in a meeting in the Salt Lake Tabernacle, Kimball promised his audience that "in less than six months, clothing and other goods would be sold in the streets of Salt Lake City cheaper than they could be purchased in New York City." The ensuing California Gold Rush then made this promise possible.

He used one slave, Green Flake, who was given to the church for tithing, as his personal driver.

== Government service ==
When the provisional government of the State of Deseret was organized in spring 1849, Kimball was appointed the chief justice and lieutenant governor of the proposed state.

Kimball served in the Utah Territorial Legislature in the upper house (the Territorial Council) from 1851 until 1858. He was president of the Council during the session beginning in March 1851, but later served as a regular member of the Council.

== Death ==
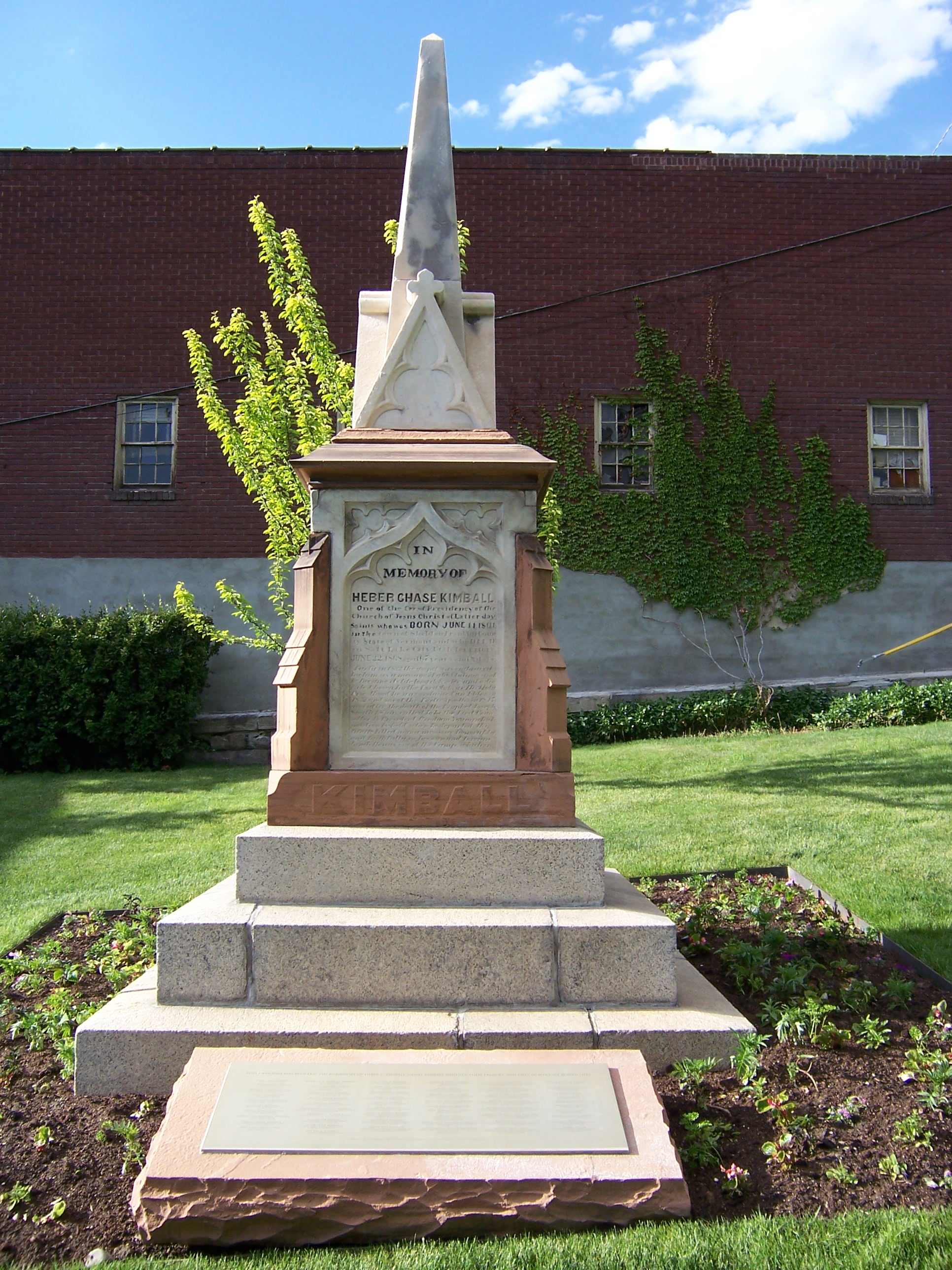
Grave marker of Heber C. Kimball.

A personal friend of Kimball wrote, one night at family prayers, Kimball said that "the angel Moroni had visited him the night before and informed him that his work on this earth was finished, and he would soon be taken!" Kimball died the following day on June 22, 1868, at age 67, in Salt Lake City, Utah Territory, from the effects of a fall. He was buried in the Kimball-Whitney Cemetery (40.772949, -111.889755), located on the south slope of what's now known as Capitol Hill, an area then called "Heber's Bench" after him.

Kimball's name is listed as one of the original pioneers on Cyrus Dallin's Brigham Young Monument in Temple Square.

== Family ==
Kimball received private instruction from Joseph Smith on plural marriage (polygamy). Initially reluctant, Kimball accepted the responsibility and married a second wife, Sarah Noon. His first wife, Vilate Murray Kimball, accepted plural marriage after reportedly claiming independent revelation directly to her that it matched what "the Lord has shown me” and welcomed the additional wives as sisters. Heber and Vilate agreed to give their 14-year-old daughter Helen Mar as a plural wife of Joseph Smith. Kimball considered the marrying of multiple wives an expression of his faith in and obedience to God: "I have noticed that a man who has but one wife, and is inclined to that doctrine, soon begins to wither and dry up, while a man who goes into plurality [of wives] looks fresh, young, and sprightly. Why is this? Because God loves that man, and because he honors His work and word."

=== Wives and children ===
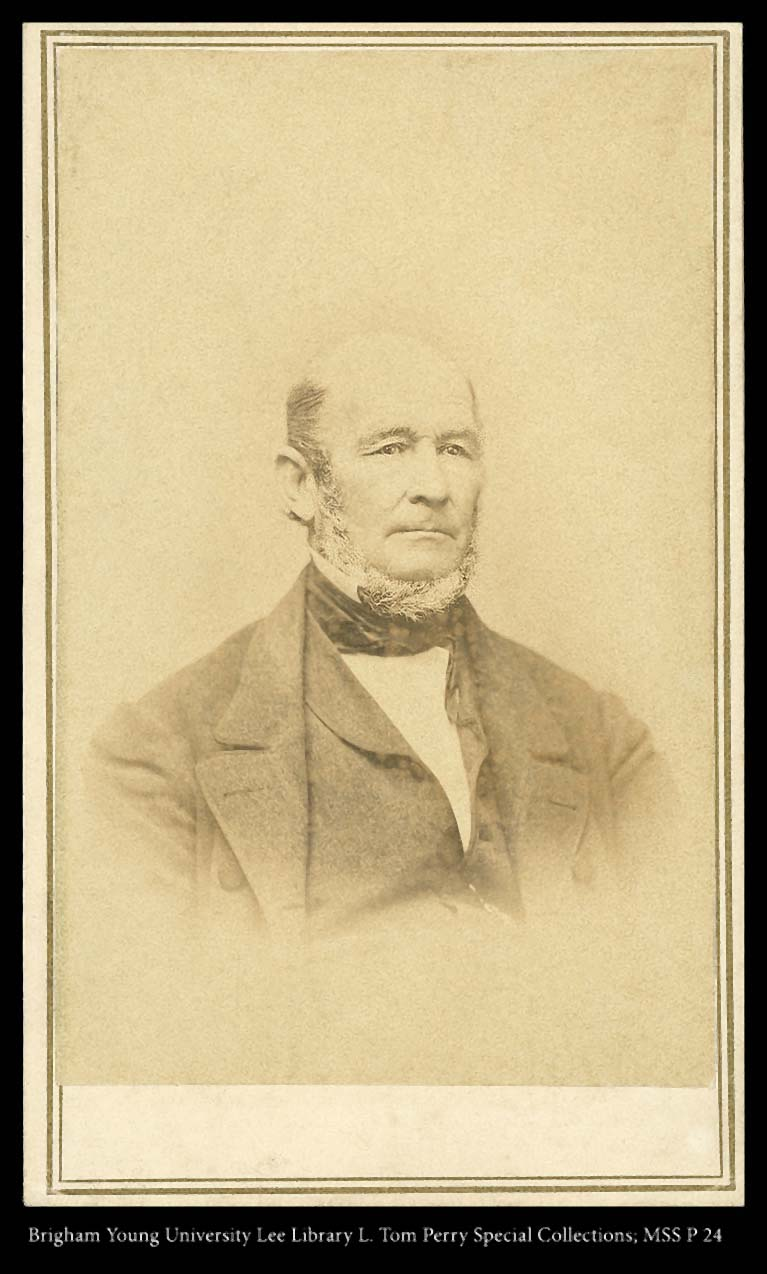
Heber C. Kimball around 1862

Kimball eventually married a total of forty-three women, although it is stated that many of these marriages were merely caretaking arrangements lacking physical intimacy. Kimball had sixty-six children by seventeen of his wives.

List of wives and children
- Vilate Murray (1 June 1806 Florida, New York– 22 October 1867 Salt Lake City). Married on 7 November 1822 in Mendon. They had 10 children;
  - Judith Marvin Kimball (29 July 1823 – 20 May 1824)
  - William Henry Kimball (10 April 1825 – 29 December 1907)
  - Helen Mar Kimball (20 August 1828 – 13 November 1896)
  - Roswell Heber Kimball (10 January 1831 – 15 June 1831)
  - Heber Parley Kimball (1 January 1835 – 8 February 1885)
  - David Patten Kimball (23 August 1839 – 21 November 1883)
  - Charles Spaulding Kimball (2 January 1843 – 2 December 1925)
  - Brigham Willard Kimball (29 June 1845 – 23 July 1867)
  - Solomon Farnham Kimball (2 February 1847 – 7 February 1920)
  - Murray Gould Kimball (20 January 1850 – 27 June 1852)
- Sarah (Peak) Noon (3 May 1811 Staffordshire, England– 3 December 1873). They married in 1842, she was his first plural wife, and had four children;
  - Adelbert Kimball (1842–1843)
  - Henry Kimball (1844- c.1868)
  - Sarah Helen Kimball (1 July 1845 – 1 December 1860)
  - Heber Kimball (1849–1850)
- Ann Alice Gheen (20 December 1827 Pennsylvania-12 October 1879 Salt Lake City), married on 10 September 1844.
  - Samuel Heber Kimball (9 December 1851 – 18 April 1943)
  - Daniel Heber Kimball (8 February 1856 – 26 April 1936)
  - Andrew Kimball (6 September 1858 – 31 August 1924), twin of Alice
  - Alice Ann Kimball (6 September 1858 – 19 December 1946), twin of Andrew
  - Sarah Gheen Kimball (31 May 1861 – 8 February 1913)
- Mary Ellen Harris Abel (5 October 1818 New York-28 October 1902 Salt Lake City), married on 1 October 1844.
  - Peter Kimball (19 December 1855 – 27 September 1860)
- Martha McBride Knight (17 March 1805 New York-20 November 1901 Ogden, Utah), married on 12 October 1844.
  - Infant Son (born and died in 1845)
- Ellen Sanders, born Aagaat Ysteinsdatter, (11 April 1823 Norway-22 November 1871 Salt Lake City), married on 5 November 1844.
  - Samuel Chase Kimball (13 February 1848-July 1848)
  - Joseph Smith Kimball (2 June 1850 – 29 November 1864), twin of Augusta
  - Augusta Kimball (2 June 1850 – 5 October 1861), twin of Joseph
  - Rosalia Kimball (25 November 1853 – 22 February 1950)
  - Jedediah Heber Kimball (10 March 1855 – 24 June 1927)
- Frances Jessie Swan (born June 1822 in Scotland), married 1845, divorced 7 December 1851, died 30 May 1894 in San Francisco, CA).
  - Margaret Jane Kimball (9 April 1846 – 10 August 1846); died at Winter Quarters
- Clarisa Cutler (23 December 1824 New York-1852 Kansas), married on 28 February 1845 and separated in 1848.
  - Abraham Alonzo Kimball (16 April 1846 – 25 September 1889)
- Lucy Walker (Smith) (30 April 1826 – 1910), married on 8 February 1845.
  - Rachel Sylvia Kimball (28 January 1846 – 12 December 1847)
  - John Heber Kimball (12 December 1850 – 28 November 1918)
  - Willard Heber Kimball (25 January 1853 – 5 December 1854)
  - Lydia Holmes Kimball (18 January 1855 – 15 April 1928)
  - Ann Spaulding Kimball (18 March 1857 – 27 November 1932)
  - Eliza Kimball (14 May 1859 - 18 May 1906)
  - Washington Kimball (22 March 1861 - 26 September 1914)
  - Joshua Heber Kimball (22 October 1862 – 1863)
  - Franklin Heber Kimball (born 28 August 1864 – 1865)
- Sarah Ann Whitney (1825–1873). They married on 17 March 1845 and had 7 children;
  - David Kimball (8 March 1846 – 1847)
  - David Orson Kimball (26 August 1848 – 16 April 1849)
  - David Heber Kimball (born 26 February 1850)
  - Newel Whitney Kimball (born 19 May 1852)
  - Horace Heber Kimball (born 3 September 1853)
  - Sarah Maria Kimball (4 May 1857 - 12 August 1901)
  - Joshua Heber Kimball (23 February 1861 - 6 April 1925)
- Harriet Sanders, born Helga Ysteinsdatter Bakka, (7 December 1824 Norway-5 September 1896 Utah), married 26 January 1846.
  - Harriet Kimball (born & died 8 May 1852)
  - Hyrum Heber Kimball (6 July 1855 – 4 June 1943)
  - Eugene Kimball (born 15 January 1863)
- Emily Trask Cutler (23 February 1828 New York-1852 Kansas), married on 2 February 1846, separated in 1848.
  - Isaac A. Kimball (13 October 1846 – 24 February 1914)
- Amanda Trimble Gheen (18 January 1830 Pennsylvania-4 November 1904 Salt Lake City), younger sister of Anne, married on 2 February 1846.
  - William Gheen Kimball (3 March 1851 – 24 March 1924)
  - Albert Heber Kimball (13 September 1854 – 2 March 1944)
  - Jeremiah Heber Kimball (15 August 1857 – 25 May 1887)
  - Moroni Heber Kimball (23 May 1861 – 21 January 1924)
- Ruth Amelia Reese (10 May 1817 Pennsylvania-26 November 1902 Salt Lake City), married on 3 February 1846.
  - Susannah R. Kimball (born & died 7 July 1851)
  - Jacob Reese Kimball (15 April 1853 – 30 May 1875)
  - Enoch Heber Kimball (29 September 1855 – 20 August 1877)
- Christine Golden (12 September 1823 Hopewell, New Jersey-30 January 1896 Salt Lake City). They were married on 3 February 1846 in Nauvoo, Illinois.
  - Cornelia Christine Kimball (7 June 1850-23 Dec 1853))
  - Jonathan Golden Kimball (June 9, 1853 – September 2, 1938)
  - Mary Margaret Kimball (30 April 1861 – 28 September 1937)
- Prescinda Lathrop Huntington (Buell, Smith) (7 September 1810 New York–1 February 1892 Salt Lake City), married on 4 February 1846 and had 2 children;
  - Prescinda Celestia Kimball (9 January 1849 Salt Lake City-8 May 1850); drowned in City Creek at age 16 months
  - Joseph Smith Kimball (22 December 1851 - 29 March 1936)
- Mary Smithies (7 October 1837 – 1880), married 25 January 1857.
  - Mary Melvina Kimball (29 August 1858 – 8 May 1933)
  - James Heber Kimball (1860-2 June 1866)
  - Wilford Alfonzo Kimball (6 October 1863 – 15 November 1928)
  - Lorenzo Heber Kimball (6 February 1866 – 2 July 1929)
  - Abbie Sarah Kimball (15 Jan 1868 England-23 February 1943)); first child born in England to Mormon parents

Kimball was also married to, but did not have children with;

- Mary Fielding Smith (21 July 1801 England-21 September 1852 Salt Lake City), married on 14 September 1844.
- Charlotte Chase (11 May 1825 Vermont- 15 December 1904 Idaho), married on 10 October 1844 (separated 1849).
- Nancy Maria Winchester (19 August 1828 Pennsylvania-17 March 1876). Married on 10 October 1844. Separated in 1865.
- Sarah Lawrence (born 13 May 1826 Canada). Married on 12 October 1844 and divorce on 18 June 1851.
- Ruth Wellington (born 11 March 1809 Massachusetts), separated 1846
- Abigail Pitkin (17 July 1797 New York-15 May 1847 Winter Quarters). Married 7 January 1846.
- Margaret McMinn (born 7 April 1829 in Philadelphia). Married in February 1846.
- Ruth Pierce (11 February 1818-after 1861), whom he married on 3 February 1846. They did not have children. They were separated in 1853.
- Hulda Barnes (1 October 1806 Massachusetts-2 September 1898 Utah). Married on 3 February 1846.
- Sophronia Melinda Harmon (5 April 1824 Pennsylvania-26 January 1847 Winter Quarters). Married on 3 February 1846.
- Mary Houston (11 September 1818 Ohio-24 December 1896 Salt Lake City). Married on 3 February 1846.
- Laura Pitkin (10 September 1790 Connecticut-16 November 1866 Salt Lake City). Married on 3 February 1846.
- Theresa Arathusa Morley (18 July 1826 Kirtland, Ohio-7 October 1855 Salt Lake City). Married on 3 February 1846 and Separated in March 1852.
- Abigail Buchannan (born 9 January 1802 in Massachusetts). Married on 7 February 1846. Separated in 1846.
- Elizabeth Hereford (born July 1789 in Herefordshire, England). Married on 7 February 1846 and divorced on 18 April 1852.
- Elizabeth Doty/Cravath (29 April 1808 New York-21 January 1889 Utah), married on 11 April 1846.
- Mary Dull (born 23 November 1807 Pennsylvania), married on 21 May 1848.
- Mary Ann Shefflin (separated in 1850)
- Dorothy Moon (born 9 February 1804 in Lancashire, England). Married on 14 March 1856.
- Hannah Moon (born 29 May 1802 in Lancashire, England). Married on 14 March 1856.
- Adelia Almira Wilcox (29 March 1828 New York-19 October 1896 Utah). Married on 9 October 1856.
- Rebecca Swain (born 3 Aug 1798 [Penn.]). Married on 7 Feb 1846.
- Sara Schuler

=== Descendants ===
Kimball has a number of noteworthy descendants, including:

- Spencer W. Kimball, Grandson
- Orson F. Whitney, Grandson
- Natacha Rambova, Great-granddaughter
- Nick Udall, Great-grandson
- Edward L. Kimball, Great-grandson
- Quentin L. Cook, Great-great-grandson
- Miles Kimball, Great-great-grandson
- J. Golden Kimball, Son
- Elias S. Kimball, son
- Richard Ian Kimball

== See also ==
- John P. Greene
- Heber C. Kimball Gristmill
- List of non-canonical revelations in The Church of Jesus Christ of Latter-day Saints
- Mormon pioneers
- William Henry Kimball

== Notes ==
The Church of Jesus Christ of Latter-day Saints titles
Preceded by Sidney Rigdon	First Counselor in the First Presidency; December 27, 1847 – June 22, 1868	Succeeded by George A. Smith
Church of Jesus Christ of Latter Day Saints titles
Preceded by Brigham Young	Quorum of the Twelve Apostles; February 14, 1835 – December 27, 1847	Succeeded by Orson Hyde
