= Richard Kimball =

Richard Kimball may refer to:

- Richard Kimball (politician), American politician, educator and founder of the nonprofit organization Project Vote Smart
- Richard Kimball (musician) (born 1941), American composer and pianist
- Richard Ian Kimball, professor of history at Brigham Young University
- Richard H. Kimball, venture capitalist and technology investor

== See also ==
- Dick Kimball, American diver and diving coach
- Richard Kimble, a character from the film and TV series The Fugitive
- Dick Kimble, baseball shortstop
