= William Kimball =

Bill Kimball, Billy Kimball, or William Kimball may refer to:

- William P. Kimball (1857–1926), U.S. Representative from Kentucky
- William Wallace Kimball (1828–1904), Iowa real estate broker and Chicago piano manufacturer
- William Wirt Kimball (1848–1930), U.S. naval officer
- William Henry Kimball (1826–1907), Mormon pioneer
- Bill Kimball (1908–1962), politician
- Billy Kimball (born 1959), writer and producer
