= Elias S. Kimball =

Elias Smith Kimball

Personal details
- Born: May 30, 1857; Salt Lake City, Utah Territory, United States
- Died: June 13, 1934 (aged 77)
- Parents: Heber C. Kimball; Christeene Golden Kimball
- Relatives: J. Golden Kimball (brother)

Elias S. Kimball (30 May 1857, Salt Lake City – 13 June 1934) was the first Mormon U.S. Army chaplain and first in any branch of the United States military. He served in the Spanish–American War with the Second Army Corps Volunteer Engineer Regiment after an appointment to the rank of captain by U.S. President William McKinley around June 19, 1898. He was also a businessman with his older brother, J. Golden Kimball. He was a member of the Utah Territorial legislature (Territorial Assembly) 1888–1889 and Logan, Utah city council 1883–1884. He was a president of the Southern States Mission after his brother J. Golden Kimball, and was named a Seventy by Joseph F. Smith in 1884 and 1894.
