= Clifford E. Young =

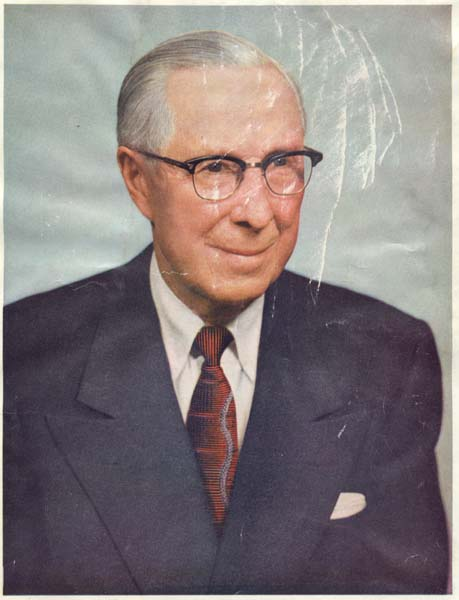

Assistant to the Quorum of the Twelve Apostles
- April 6, 1941 – August 21, 1958

Personal details
- Born: Clifford Earle Young; December 7, 1883; Salt Lake City, Utah Territory, United States
- Died: August 21, 1958 (aged 74); Salt Lake City, Utah, United States
- Resting place: American Fork Cemetery; 40.3897°N 111.7969°W
- Spouse(s): Edith Grant
- Children: 4
- Parents: Seymour B. Young; Ann E. Riter

Clifford Earle Young (December 7, 1883 – August 21, 1958) was a general authority of the Church of Jesus Christ of Latter-day Saints (LDS Church) from 1941 until his death.

Young was born in Salt Lake City, Utah Territory, the son of LDS Church leader Seymour B. Young. From 1905 to 1908, he served as a Mormon missionary in England and Germany. In 1928, Young became the president of the Alpine Stake of the LDS Church in Utah. In 1934, he joined the Mormon Tabernacle Choir.

In 1941, Young became one of the first five individuals selected as Assistants to the Quorum of the Twelve Apostles. Young served in this position until his death in Salt Lake City.

Young was married to Edith Grant, a daughter of LDS Church president Heber J. Grant.
