= St. David, Arizona =

CDP in Cochise County, Arizona

- CDP
- Location in Cochise County and the state of Arizona

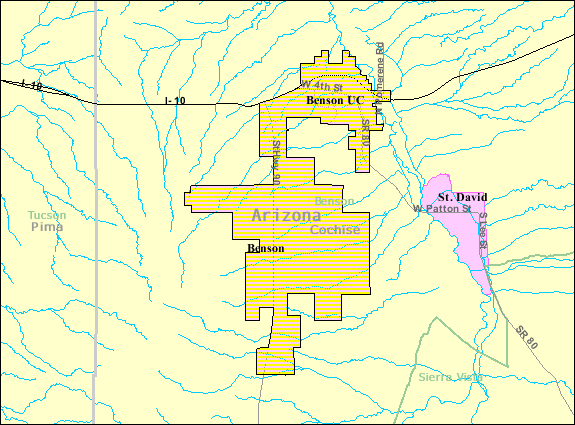
- Detailed location (pink), shown in relation to Benson (yellow)

- Location in the United States
- Coordinates: 31°53′40″N 110°13′35″W
- Country: United States
- State: Arizona
- County: Cochise
- Founded: 1877

Area
  - Total: 6.07 sq mi (15.71 km^{2})
  - Land: 6.05 sq mi (15.67 km^{2})
  - Water: 0.015 sq mi (0.04 km^{2})
- Elevation: 3,642 ft (1,110 m)

Population (2020)
  - Total: 1,639
  - Density: 270.9/sq mi (104.61/km^{2})
- Time zone: UTC-7 (MST (no DST))
- FIPS code: 04-62280
- GNIS feature ID: 2409227

St. David or Saint David is a census-designated place (CDP) in Cochise County, Arizona, United States. The population was 1,639 at the 2020 census, down from 1,699 at the 2010 census.

== History ==
St. David was established as a result of the Mormon Battalion having earlier passed through the San Pedro River valley in 1846. One of the founders of St. David, Philemon C. Merrill, was a member of the battalion. The Mormon settlers of 1877 were part of a group that originally was to settle Lehi, Arizona. The town was named after David Patten Kimball. The early St. David settlers played an important role in establishing the subsequent surrounding settlements, such as Fort Huachuca and Tombstone, as they did much of the logging in the Huachuca Mountains to provide lumber for the construction of those locations.

As a tight-knit Mormon community, St. David managed better than other small towns in Cochise County during the Great Depression.

An influx of non-Mormons, principally from Oklahoma and Texas, took place when St. David became the site for Civilian Conservation Corps Camp SCS-19-A from 1935 to 1940. Works included soil erosion and flood control projects.

The first natural gas lines brought into Cochise County were installed in St. David..

== Geography ==
According to the United States Census Bureau, the CDP has a total area of 5.3 square miles (14 km^{2}), all land.

The portion of Arizona State Route 80 that runs east-west through town uses the earlier Patten Street alignment, with the center of town located at the intersection of Patten and Miller Lane.

The main crossings of the San Pedro River in St. David are at Dragoon Wash to the northwest and Escalante Crossing to the south. The latter was known as upper crossing and was the site of a stagecoach station.

=== Climate ===
St. David has a semi-arid climate (Köppen: BSk) with cool winters, hot summers, and large diurnal temperature variation throughout the year.

Climate data for Benson, Arizona, 1991–2020 normals, extremes 1944–present
Month	Jan	Feb	Mar	Apr	May	Jun	Jul	Aug	Sep	Oct	Nov	Dec	Year
Record high °F (°C)	84 (29)	90 (32)	93 (34)	99 (37)	108 (42)	112 (44)	110 (43)	110 (43)	105 (41)	99 (37)	91 (33)	84 (29)	112 (44)
Mean maximum °F (°C)	75.4 (24.1)	79.0 (26.1)	85.6 (29.8)	91.8 (33.2)	99.2 (37.3)	105.4 (40.8)	105.6 (40.9)	102.4 (39.1)	99.2 (37.3)	93.9 (34.4)	83.1 (28.4)	76.6 (24.8)	107.0 (41.7)
Mean daily maximum °F (°C)	64.7 (18.2)	68.0 (20.0)	74.4 (23.6)	81.4 (27.4)	89.7 (32.1)	99.0 (37.2)	97.5 (36.4)	95.2 (35.1)	92.0 (33.3)	84.2 (29.0)	73.3 (22.9)	64.4 (18.0)	82.0 (27.8)
Daily mean °F (°C)	45.9 (7.7)	49.1 (9.5)	54.8 (12.7)	61.2 (16.2)	69.2 (20.7)	78.3 (25.7)	81.7 (27.6)	80.0 (26.7)	75.1 (23.9)	64.6 (18.1)	53.5 (11.9)	45.7 (7.6)	63.3 (17.4)
Mean daily minimum °F (°C)	27.1 (−2.7)	30.1 (−1.1)	35.3 (1.8)	41.0 (5.0)	48.7 (9.3)	57.7 (14.3)	65.9 (18.8)	64.8 (18.2)	58.1 (14.5)	45.1 (7.3)	33.6 (0.9)	26.9 (−2.8)	44.5 (6.9)
Mean minimum °F (°C)	16.8 (−8.4)	19.4 (−7.0)	23.5 (−4.7)	29.9 (−1.2)	38.0 (3.3)	47.1 (8.4)	56.8 (13.8)	58.1 (14.5)	48.4 (9.1)	31.9 (−0.1)	21.1 (−6.1)	16.3 (−8.7)	13.5 (−10.3)
Record low °F (°C)	6 (−14)	4 (−16)	10 (−12)	18 (−8)	26 (−3)	37 (3)	46 (8)	48 (9)	35 (2)	20 (−7)	10 (−12)	−7 (−22)	−7 (−22)
Average precipitation inches (mm)	0.80 (20)	0.63 (16)	0.57 (14)	0.19 (4.8)	0.17 (4.3)	0.29 (7.4)	2.56 (65)	2.79 (71)	1.64 (42)	0.65 (17)	0.51 (13)	0.88 (22)	11.77 (299)
Average snowfall inches (cm)	0.2 (0.51)	0.0 (0.0)	0.0 (0.0)	0.0 (0.0)	0.0 (0.0)	0.0 (0.0)	0.0 (0.0)	0.0 (0.0)	0.0 (0.0)	0.0 (0.0)	0.0 (0.0)	0.0 (0.0)	0.2 (0.51)
Average precipitation days (≥ 0.01 inch)	3.8	4.3	2.8	1.6	1.6	2.4	10.2	11.3	5.3	2.7	2.7	3.9	52.6
Average snowy days (≥ 0.1 inch)	0.1	0.0	0.0	0.0	0.0	0.0	0.0	0.0	0.0	0.0	0.0	0.1	0.2
Source: NOAA

== Demographics ==
Historical population
Census	Pop.	Note	%±
2000	1,744		—
2010	1,699		−2.6%
2020	1,639		−3.5%
U.S. Decennial Census

=== 2020 census ===
As of the 2020 census, St. David had a population of 1,639. The median age was 47.1 years. 23.6% of residents were under the age of 18 and 25.3% of residents were 65 years of age or older. For every 100 females there were 113.4 males, and for every 100 females age 18 and over there were 112.7 males age 18 and over.

0.0% of residents lived in urban areas, while 100.0% lived in rural areas.

There were 672 households in St. David, of which 20.2% had children under the age of 18 living in them. Of all households, 57.4% were married-couple households, 21.7% were households with a male householder and no spouse or partner present, and 16.2% were households with a female householder and no spouse or partner present. About 29.3% of all households were made up of individuals and 15.8% had someone living alone who was 65 years of age or older.

There were 832 housing units, of which 19.2% were vacant. The homeowner vacancy rate was 2.7% and the rental vacancy rate was 12.8%.

Racial composition as of the 2020 census
Race	Number	Percent
White	1,419	86.6%
Black or African American	6	0.4%
American Indian and Alaska Native	16	1.0%
Asian	8	0.5%
Native Hawaiian and Other Pacific Islander	0	0.0%
Some other race	29	1.8%
Two or more races	161	9.8%
Hispanic or Latino (of any race)	191	11.7%

=== 2000 census ===
As of the census of 2000, there were 1,744 people, 666 households, and 462 families residing in the CDP. The population density was 327.7 inhabitants per square mile (126.5/km^{2}). There were 892 housing units at an average density of 167.6 per square mile (64.7/km^{2}). The racial makeup of the CDP was 93.0% White, 0.4% Black or African American, 0.3% Native American, 0.5% Asian, 0.2% Pacific Islander, 3.0% from other races, and 2.6% from two or more races. 9.8% of the population were Hispanic or Latino of any race.

There were 666 households, out of which 28.1% had children under the age of 18 living with them, 59.3% were married couples living together, 8.1% had a female householder with no husband present, and 30.5% were non-families. 26.9% of all households were made up of individuals, and 17.0% had someone living alone who was 65 years of age or older. The average household size was 2.60 and the average family size was 3.16.

In the CDP, the age distribution of the population shows 28.3% under the age of 18, 5.4% from 18 to 24, 18.2% from 25 to 44, 23.3% from 45 to 64, and 24.8% who were 65 years of age or older. The median age was 44 years. For every 100 females, there were 96.4 males. For every 100 females age 18 and over, there were 98.6 males.

The median income for a household in the CDP was $30,840, and the median income for a family was $32,292. Males had a median income of $31,641 versus $21,339 for females. The per capita income for the CDP was $12,872. About 8.7% of families and 12.1% of the population were below the poverty line, including 13.6% of those under age 18 and 3.8% of those age 65 or over.

== Education ==
In 1878 a one-room schoolhouse was built from stone, but it was destroyed in the 1887 Sonora earthquake. The 500-pound bell from that schoolhouse is now on display at the current school. In 1938 a brick schoolhouse was built, it still stands today and is on the National Register of Historic Places. It is one of the oldest standing structures in the area. The St. David School District is also the oldest in the San Pedro Valley. The annual San Pedro Valley Fair has been held at the St. David High School since 1934. In 2008 St. David held a celebration its 130 anniversary during the 75th San Pedro Valley Fair with a Town Reunion at the St. David School. Another popular cultural event held at the school is the annual 1880s Historic Costume Ball, which is patterned after a typical postbellum Indian War-era military ball.

== Transportation ==
Benson Area Transit provides transportation to Benson two days a week.

== Notable people ==
- David Patten Kimball Mormon pioneer

== See also ==
- The Church of Jesus Christ of Latter-day Saints in Arizona
