= David Patten Kimball =

Mormon leader (1839–1883)

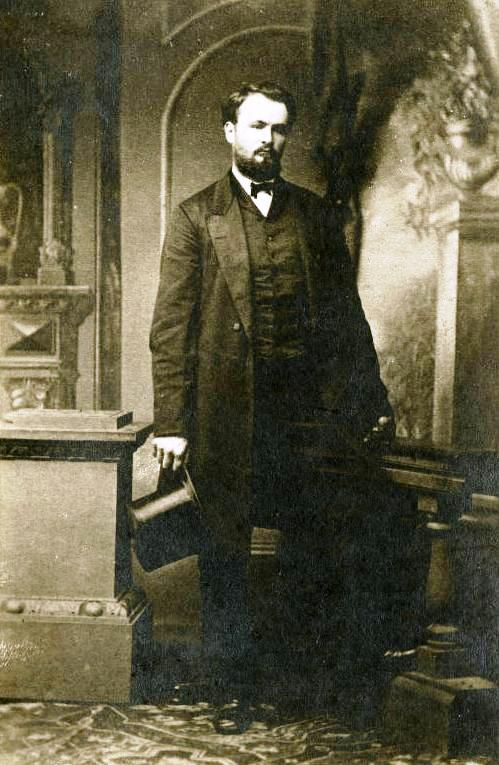
- Born: August 23, 1839; Nauvoo, Illinois
- Died: November 21, 1883 (aged 44); St. David, Arizona
- Spouses: Juliette Merrill; Caroline Marian Williams
- Parent(s): Heber C. Kimball; Vilate Murray

David Patten Kimball (August 23, 1839 – November 21, 1883) was an early Mormon leader and one of the three young men of the Sweetwater handcart rescue.

Kimball was born on August 23, 1839, in Nauvoo, Illinois the son of Heber C. Kimball and his wife, the former Vilate Murray. His father was an apostle in the Church of Jesus Christ of Latter-day Saints and left to serve a mission in England about the time of David's birth.

In the winter of 1856, Kimball helped a company of handcart pioneers stranded near the Sweetwater River, in response to a request from Brigham Young. Several accounts of the event imply that Young promised Kimball and others a guaranteed place in heaven for their efforts, although no direct evidence attributing this statement to Young exist.

Kimball served as president of the Bear Lake stake in Utah before moving to Arizona in 1877. He was a teamster, and when he died he was first counselor in the St. Joseph stake.

In November 1881, Kimball was making a freight run between Maricopa railroad station and Prescott when he was caught in a snowstorm near Prescott and contracted pneumonia. On the return trip, he became separated from his traveling companion and wagon and got lost in the Salt River valley south of Wickenburg. He spent four days in the desert with no food or water. During this time, he reported seeing a vision in which his deceased father warned him to get his life in order, and that he had only two years to live. Kimball had doubted Mormonism for over a decade. His traveling companion assembled a search party, and they found Kimball near present-day Surprise.

Kimball died at the age of 44 on November 21, 1883, in St. David, Arizona.

== Notable descendants ==
- Thomas S. Kimball, Arizona state senator, son
- Quentin L. Cook, great-grandson, apostle in the Church of Jesus Christ of Latter-day Saints

Lineage: Heber C. Kimball -(Vilate Murray Kimball)- David Patten Kimball - Quince Kimball - LaVon Kimball - Elden Clifford Kimball - Lynda Diane Kimball Richards - John Adair Kimball -

== See also ==
- David W. Patten, Kimball's namesake
- The Church of Jesus Christ of Latter-day Saints in Arizona
