= Heber C. Kimball Gristmill =

Coordinates: 40°52′48.24″N 111°52′22.72″W

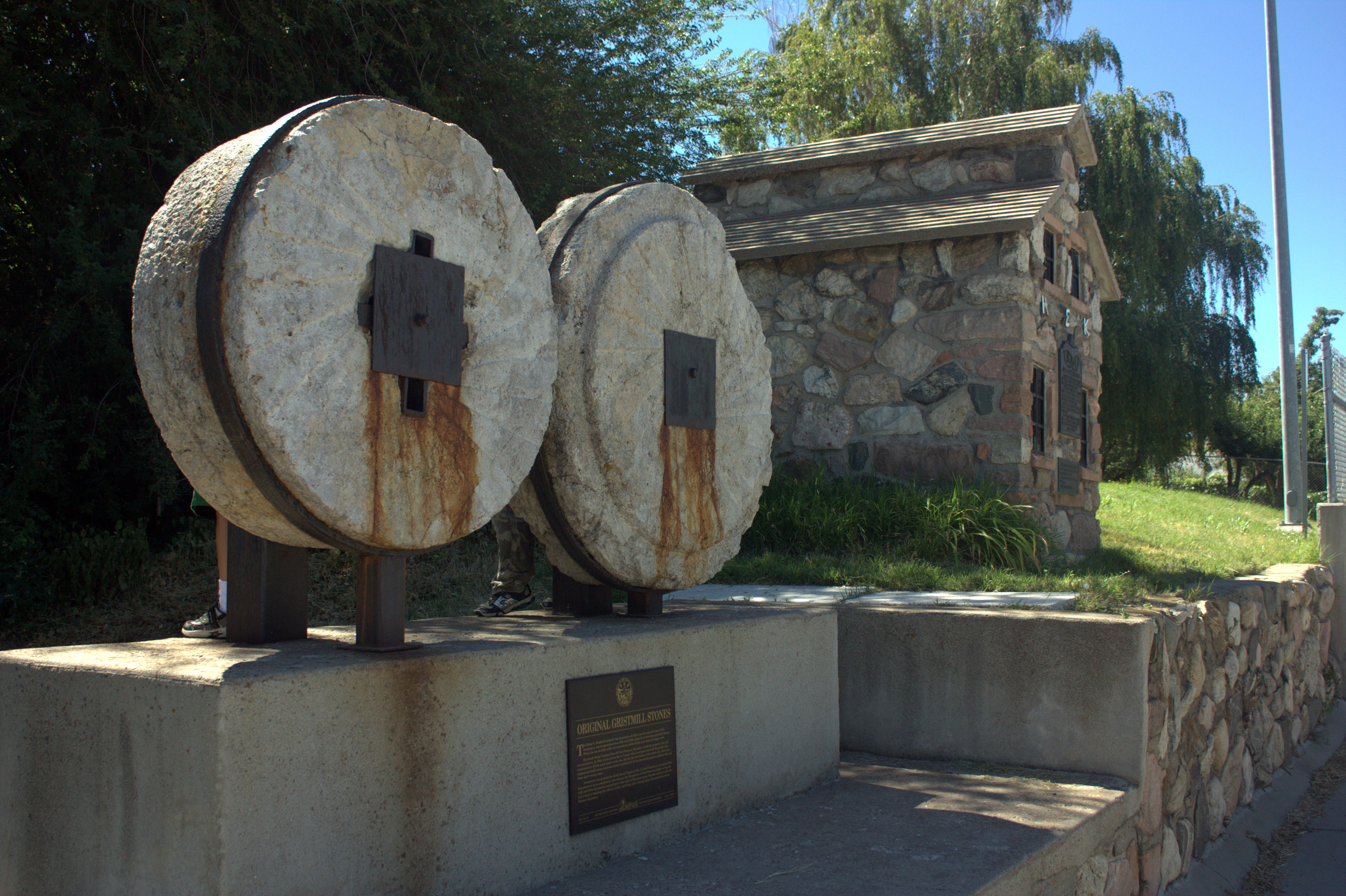
Heber C. Kimball Gristmill Monument in Bountiful, Utah

The Heber C. Kimball Gristmill was built in 1853 under the direction of Heber C. Kimball. Constructed within what was known as North Mill Cañon (Bountiful, Utah today), the gristmill ground grains for nearly 40 years. During a period of a few years, the mill employed trained bears which were captured in the mountains east of the mill. Once burr mills became obsolete due to the invention of roller mills, the building was employed as an entertainment center. Today, only the foundation and a few feet of the adobe walls of the original three-story building remain.

Some 30 yards east of the original site stands a monument consisting of a replica mill, two original burr-type gristmill stones re-discovered in 1984 and three four-foot high pillars commemorating individuals involved in the planning or operation of the mill.

== Monument history ==
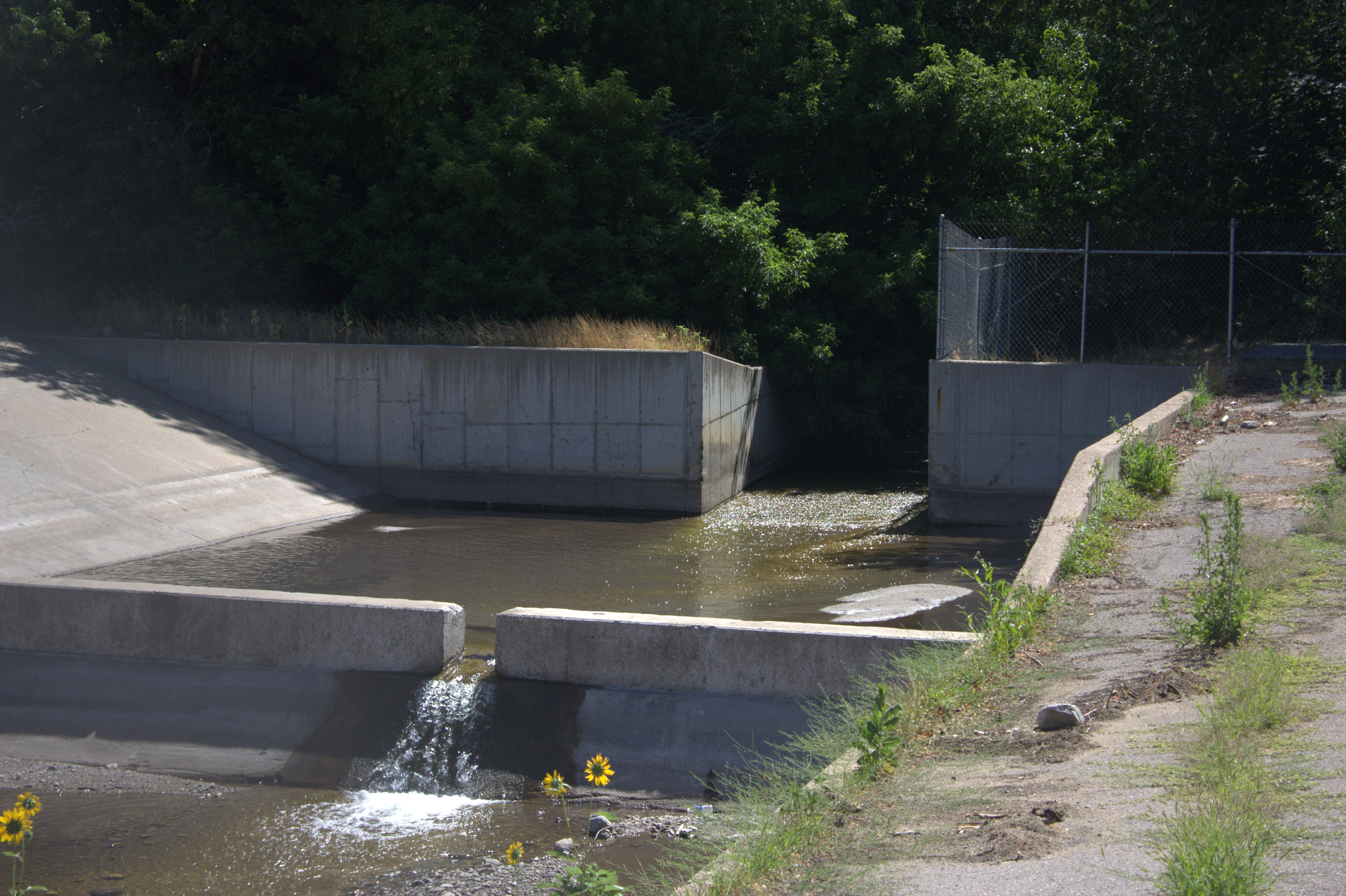
Debris Catch site for Mill Creek built in 1984

The Heber C. Kimball Gristmill monument is located in Bountiful just south of Bountiful High School. It consists of a 1:3 scale replica burr mill built in 1937 and two original burr-type grist stones found in 1984 during city excavation for a debris catch at the end of Mill Creek. Also erected are three four-foot-high pillars dedicated to three men involved in the building and operation of the mill: Heber Chase Kimball, Daniel Davis and George Quinn McNeil.

Gristmill replica

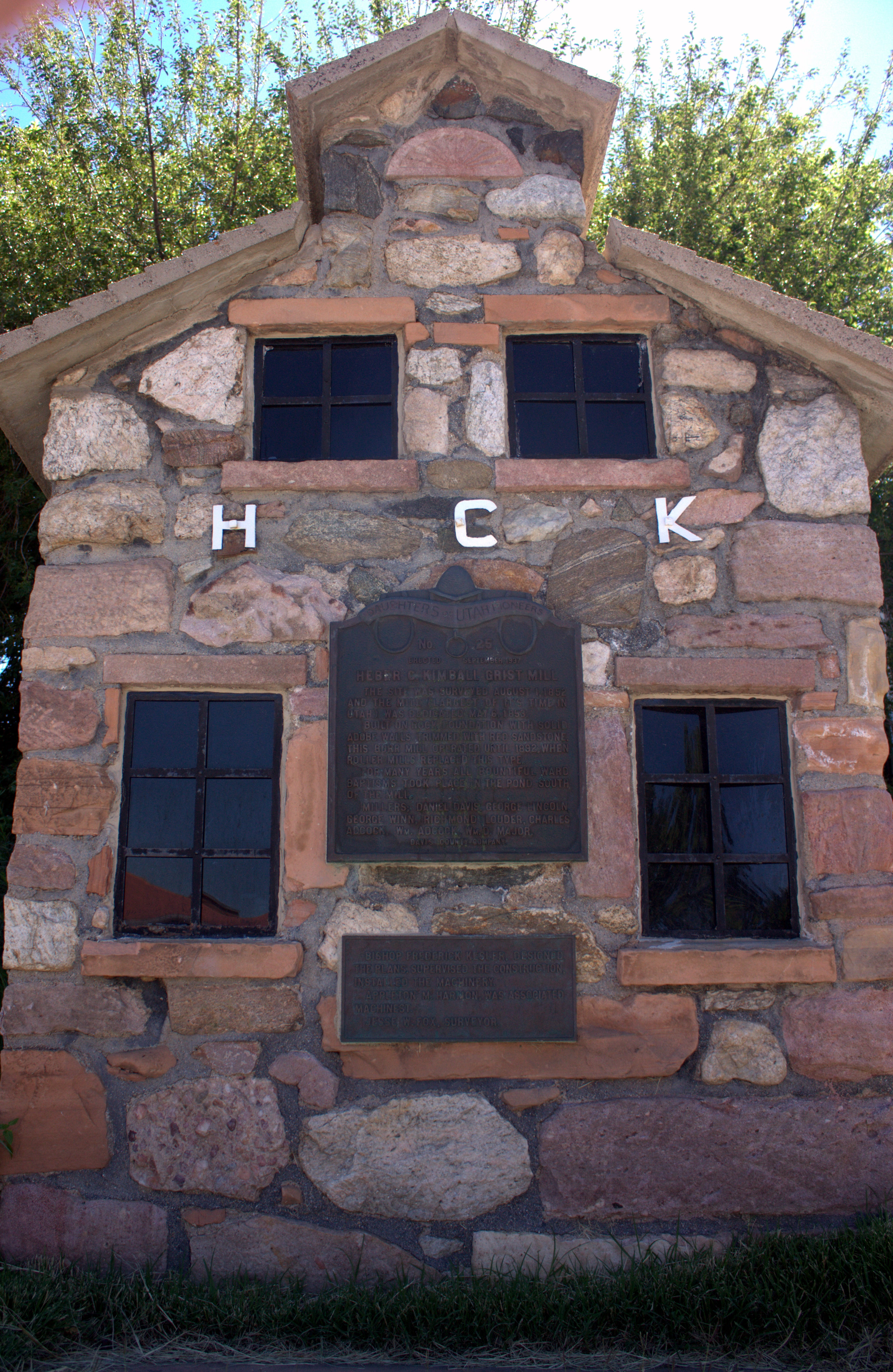
Heber C. Kimball Grist Mills in Bountiful Utah

The gristmill replica was constructed in September 1937 by the Daughters of Utah Pioneers. The replica sits 30 yards east of the original burr mill, which was built in the early 1850s and operated through 1892. The replica mill measures nine feet six inches high with a depth of 8 feet 6 inches and a width of 6 feet. It is open to the public at all times and can be accessed via Mill Street from Orchard Drive in Bountiful, Utah.

Gristmill stones

When roller mills were introduced in the late 19th century, burr mills became obsolete. The Heber C. Kimball Gristmill stopped operation in 1892. Ninety-two years later (1984), Davis County, Utah and Bountiful began construction of a debris catch site for Mill Creek. The debris catch site would sit in the same place that the gristmill stood 100 years earlier. During excavation, two original gristmill stones were found. Although out of use and buried for nearly 100 years, the stones are in remarkably good condition. Under the direction of the Sons of Utah Pioneers, the stones were put on display 10 yards to the north of the gristmill replica created about half a century previously by the Daughters of Utah Pioneers.

== Mill history ==
After arriving in the Salt Lake Valley in 1847, Heber C. Kimball, then 1st Counselor to Brigham Young in the First Presidency of the Church of Jesus Christ of Latter-day Saints, decided to grist grains. He had family in the area and Bountiful (then known as the North Cañon Ward) was heavily engaged in grain production. The site in the North Mill Cañon was chosen and he received land rights in 1851. Kimball selected Daniel Davis, an early Mormon convert adopted into the Kimball family, and Davis began clearing ground on July 18, 1852. Nine months later, on April 20, 1853, Isaac Hunter and Daniel Davis laid the northwestern and southeastern cornerstones respectively. The following day, Heber C. Kimball dedicated the building.

The mill was finished shortly thereafter and Davis managed the site while living in an adobe house southeast of the mill. George Quinn McNeil, a local trapper, assisted Davis. McNeil, with the help of Jerry Ellis, trapped and trained black bears from the nearby Wasatch Mountain range to work in the mills. Later, McNeil would attempt to travel the United States and show his trained black bears, but the trip was cut short as the bears "misbehaved" not far out of Bountiful.

After the death of Heber C. Kimball in 1868, his estate sold the grist mills to Bountiful Cooperative Mercantile for $8,000. By 1892, the mill had stopped all operations. The building was used into the early 20th century for entertainment.
