= James J. Hamula =

Former general authority of LDS Church

First Quorum of the Seventy
- April 5, 2008 – August 8, 2017
- Called by: Thomas S. Monson
- End reason: Excommunicated

Personal details
- Born: James Joseph Hamula; November 20, 1957 (age 67); Long Beach, California, U.S.
- Education: Brigham Young University (BA, MA, JD)

James Joseph Hamula (/ˈhæmjʊlə/; born November 20, 1957) is an American attorney and former general authority of the Church of Jesus Christ of Latter-day Saints (LDS Church).

Following church disciplinary action by the First Presidency and Quorum of the Twelve Apostles, Hamula was released from his calling as a general authority and excommunicated from the LDS Church on August 8, 2017.

== Early life and education ==
Hamula's father was Joseph Hamula, a son of Hungarian immigrants who grew up in a heavily-Magyar-speaking area of metro Cleveland, Ohio.

Hamula was born and raised in Long Beach, California. He later served as an LDS Church missionary in the Germany Munich Mission. After his mission, he received a bachelor's degree in political science and philosophy, a master's degree in political philosophy, and a Juris Doctor, all from Brigham Young University in Provo, Utah.

For one summer while studying law, Hamula completed an internship in Mesa, Arizona.

== Career ==
Hamula has spent most of his career working for the Arizona-based law firm of Gallagher & Kennedy. He was largely involved in Superfund and other environmental law issues.

=== LDS Church service ===
In the LDS Church, Hamula served as elders quorum president, bishop, stake high councilor, and stake Young Men president. He also served as president of the Mesa Arizona Salt River Stake and as the first president of the Mesa Arizona Red Mountain Stake when it was organized in 1992.

From 1994 to 1997, Hamula was president of the church's Washington D.C. South Mission. From 2000 to 2008, Hamula was an area seventy in the church's North America Southwest Area. He became a member of the First Quorum of the Seventy during the church's April 2008 general conference. He served as counselor and then, from 2011 to 2014, as president of the church's Pacific Area headquartered in Auckland, New Zealand.

On August 8, 2017, Hamula was excommunicated from the church. While the church's news release did not specify the reason for his excommunication, it did state that it was not the result of personal apostasy or disillusionment on Hamula's part. Hamula is the first general authority of the LDS Church to be excommunicated since George P. Lee in 1989.

== Personal life ==
Hamula met his wife, Joyce Anderson, as a legal intern. They married in the Mesa Arizona Temple in 1984. They have six children.

== Bibliography ==
- 2008 Deseret Morning News Church Almanac (Salt Lake City, Utah: Deseret Morning News, 2007) p. 192
- "Elder James J. Hamula," Liahona, May 2008, p. 136
