= George P. Lee =

American Mormon leader (1943–2010)

First Quorum of the Seventy
- October 3, 1975 – September 1, 1989
- Called by: Spencer W. Kimball
- End reason: Excommunicated

Personal details
- Born: George Patrick Lee; March 23, 1943; Towaoc, Colorado, United States
- Died: July 28, 2010 (aged 67); Provo, Utah, United States

George Patrick Lee (March 23, 1943 – July 28, 2010) was the first Native American to become a general authority of the Church of Jesus Christ of Latter-day Saints (LDS Church). He was a member of the church's First Quorum of Seventy from 1975 to 1989, when he was excommunicated from the church.

== Early life ==
Lee was born in Towaoc, Colorado, to Mae K. Lee (Asdzą́ą́ Łichííʼ) of the Tódíchʼíiʼnii clan, and to a Medicine Man, Peter Lee (Hastiin Jaanééz Yee Biyeʼ), of the Under the Flat-Roofed House People clan. One of 17 children from his parents' marriages, Lee was called Ashkii Yázhí (Little Boy), until he was given a sacred name, Ashkii Hoyáanii (Boy Who is Well Behaved and Good).

When he was 12 years old, Lee became one of the first children to participate in an official Indian foster placement program sponsored by the LDS Church. Lee was transported to Orem, Utah, where he lived with the Glen and Joan Harker family. Lee remained in their home for seven years, returning to his Navajo family during summer vacations, until he graduated from Orem High School in 1962.

== Early adulthood ==
Lee attended Brigham Young University, where he earned a bachelor's degree and later a doctorate in Educational Administration, and Utah State University, where he completed a master's degree. In Arizona, Lee taught at the Rough Rock Demonstration School and later served as president of the Ganado campus of Diné College. Lee married Katherine Hettich and they became the parents of seven children.

== LDS Church service ==
After graduating from high school, Lee served as a missionary for the LDS Church to the Navajo Nation, known then as the "Southwest Indian Mission".

Prior to his call as a general authority, Lee held a number of priesthood leadership callings, including elders quorum president, branch president, district president, and president of the Arizona Holbrook Mission.

On October 3, 1975, LDS Church president Spencer W. Kimball called the 32-year-old Lee to be a member of the First Quorum of the Seventy, a position with church-wide responsibilities. He was the first Native American general authority in church history.

== Excommunication and criminal conviction ==
On September 1, 1989, the LDS Church announced that Lee had been excommunicated for "apostasy and other conduct unbecoming a member of the Church." He was the first general authority to be excommunicated since 1943, when apostle Richard R. Lyman was excommunicated for adultery and unlawful cohabitation.

According to Lee, the action stemmed from his disagreement with LDS Church president Ezra Taft Benson over the role of Native Americans in the church. When he became church president, Benson had ended the church's Indian Placement Program, which Lee cited as a key to his personal development. Lee argued that Benson was not treating Native American Latter-day Saints in the way Kimball would have approved. Additionally, Lee claimed the First Presidency had accused him of polygamy, immorality, and teaching false doctrine. Lee provided copies of letters he had written to leaders of the LDS Church to the news media. The church did not publicly respond to Lee's letters or his public comments, since it is the church's policy not to publicize the details of an excommunicant's behavior which brought about the disciplinary action.

In 1993, the Salt Lake Tribune reported that Lee had attempted to sexually molest a minor girl in 1989, and that this was one of the reasons for Lee's excommunication. Initially, Lee denied the charges; however, on October 12, 1994, the Tribune reported:

A year ago, former Mormon general authority George P. Lee proclaimed he was 'innocent before God' of sexually molesting a 12-year-old neighbor girl.

But Tuesday before a 3rd District judge, Lee humbly hung his head and admitted to touching the girl's breasts for sexual gratification ...

Lee, 51, pleaded guilty to attempted sexual abuse of a child, a third-degree felony.

On July 27, 2007, Lee was arrested in Washington County, Utah, for failing to register as a sex offender in the state of Utah. The police reported that Lee had not registered since 2001 and that he had been "living in an area with several young children in close proximity." Lee was booked into Purgatory Correctional Facility in Hurricane, Utah on $5,000 bail. The case dragged on for many months due to Lee's health issues. On March 19, 2008, the case was formally dropped due to these issues and Lee eventually registered with the sex offender registry. One year later, on March 29, 2009, Lee was removed from Utah's sex offender registry.

== Death ==
Lee died in Provo, Utah on July 28, 2010, from "a long battle with physical problems". After his death, Latter-day Saint sociologist Armand Mauss described Lee as "one of the truly tragic figures in modern Mormon history".

== Publications ==
- George P. Lee, Silent Courage: An Indian Story: The Autobiography of George P. Lee, a Navajo, Deseret Book: Salt Lake City (1987).

== See also ==
- Ex-Mormon
- James J. Hamula
