= Seventy (LDS Church) =

Ecclesiastical body in the Church of Jesus Christ of Latter-day Saints

Seventy is a priesthood office in the Melchizedek priesthood of the Church of Jesus Christ of Latter-day Saints (LDS Church). Traditionally, a church member holding this priesthood office is a "traveling minister" and an "especial witness" of Jesus Christ, charged with the mission of preaching the gospel to the entire world under the direction of the Twelve Apostles. The church teaches that the office of seventy was anciently conferred upon the seventy disciples mentioned in the Gospel of Luke 10:1-2. Multiple individuals holding the office of seventy are referred to collectively as seventies.

== History of the seventy in the LDS Church ==
=== Place in church hierarchy ===
In practical terms, the priesthood office of seventy is one which has varied widely over the course of history. As originally envisioned by church founder, Joseph Smith, in the 1830s, the seventy were to be a body composed of several separate quorums of up to seventy members each, all of which would be led by seven presidents. These presidents, chosen from the first quorum, would appoint and direct the other quorums of seventy.

As introduced by Smith, the apostles and the seventy had authority only outside the main body of church members in Zion, and in the outlying stakes. Members in Zion and the stakes were led by the High Council of Zion (under the direction of the First Presidency) and stake high councils.

=== Early quorums of the seventy ===
The First Quorum of the Seventy came into being in 1835 when seven men were set apart as the First Seven Presidents of the Seventy.

In 1837, six of the seven presidents were released because it was discovered that they had previously been ordained high priests. Five of these men were ultimately replaced by others. The other two—Levi W. Hancock and Joseph Young—remained members of the First Seven Presidents for the rest of their lives. Hancock was originally one of the six who were removed, but he was reinstated when it was discovered that he in fact had not been ordained a high priest.

The quorums of the seventy are directed and supervised hierarchically by the Quorum of the Twelve Apostles, who are in turn directed by the First Presidency.

As a body, the seventy in the church are considered to be equal in priesthood authority with the Quorum of the Twelve Apostles. This presumably means that if the apostles were killed or incapacitated, the seventy could take over the function of the apostles. However, in such circumstances, the seventy would be required to act unanimously.

=== Structure and history of the seventy in the church ===
Members of the First and the Second Quorums of the Seventy are general authorities of the church with responsibilities covering the church as a whole.

Members of additional Quorums of the Seventy (currently numbered Third through Twelfth) are called an area seventy. Members of these quorums are ordained to the priesthood office of seventy, but they are not general authorities of the church. Area seventies generally have authority only within a geographical unit of the church called an area.

=== Expanding membership ===
By the time Joseph Smith was killed, he had already organized four incomplete quorums of seventy. By 1845, there were ten quorums of seventy. The seventies in the first quorum became the seven presidents for each of the other quorums; that is, there were 63 presidents, 7 for each of the 9 other quorums, and the seven remaining members were the presidency of the first quorum. The members of the first quorum were thus spread out across the church, making meetings of the first quorum rare.

Elders were often ordained to the office of seventy immediately before they left on a mission. Quorums were not restricted to geography, so individual quorums were scattered all over the world.

In 1883, church president John Taylor localized the quorums of seventy. Each stake was given a quorum of seventy, and seventies in that stake would belong to that quorum. Taylor also prescribed that the senior president of the first 64 quorums could meet with the seven presidents of the first quorum and that would constitute a meeting of the first quorum. This never happened, however. This organization continued until church president Spencer W. Kimball's reorganization of the seventies in 1976.

Though the number of seventies in the church grew, the number of presidents remained at seven. By the late 1930s, the First Seven Presidents were exclusively referred to by the church as the First Council of the Seventy.

Eventually, the stake quorums of seventy were no longer numbered and in 1936 they were put under the local responsibility of stake presidents. Subsequently, in 1961, church president David O. McKay ordained those of the First Council of the Seventy who wished to be high priests.

=== First Quorum of the Seventy formed ===
In 1975, under Kimball's direction, the First Quorum of the Seventy was reconstituted. The First Quorum was composed of the former members of the First Council of the Seventy as well as new individuals selected by Kimball. The reason for the change was that the growth of the church necessitated the call of more general authorities. In 1976, the First Council of the Seventy, the First Quorum of the Seventy, and the Assistants to the Quorum of the Twelve Apostles were all merged into a new First Quorum of the Seventy under a seven-member Presidency of the Seventy. In 1978, some of the older members of the seventy were "retired" as the first general authorities to be given emeritus status. However, members appointed through 1981 were still granted life tenure.

=== Discontinuance of local quorums of seventy ===
In 1986, all stake quorums of the seventy were discontinued. The church encouraged local leaders to have ordained seventies meet with the local elders quorum or to ordain them as high priests.

=== Second Quorum of the Seventy formed ===
In 1984, some seventies were appointed to the First Quorum of the Seventy who were not to serve for life, but for terms of three to five years. In 1989, these limited-term members were separated into a new Second Quorum of the Seventy. At the same time, the general practice was instituted of granting emeritus status to members of the First Quorum at the October general conference following their 70th birthdays, or earlier in the case of serious health problems. Some flexibility on the terms of service has emerged in recent years.

Since 1989, members of the First and Second Quorums have continued as general authorities of the church. Sometimes members are called from the Second Quorum into the First Quorum.

Since the 1976 merger of First Quorum of the Seventy, seventies are the most usual candidates to become members of the Quorum of the Twelve Apostles. Since 1976, three have been called as apostles who did not serve as general authority seventies prior to their call: Russell M. Nelson, Dallin H. Oaks, and David A. Bednar, Nelson and Oaks were ordained apostles in 1984 under church president Kimball and Bednar in 2004 under church president Gordon B. Hinckley. Additionally, having served previously as members of the First Quorum of the Seventy, Robert D. Hales, Gary E. Stevenson, and Gérald Caussé were serving as the Presiding Bishop at the time of their call to the Quorum of the Twelve.

=== Area seventies and additional quorums of seventy ===
At the church's April 1995 general conference, Hinckley announced the creation of a new leadership position known as the area authority. The area authorities were to replace the regional representatives who had served as bridge of leadership between the general authorities and the local stake and mission presidents. In 1997, it was decided that area authorities would be ordained to the office of seventy. As a result, these area authorities were renamed area authority seventies, and the church announced that these new seventies would become members of the newly created Third, Fourth, and Fifth Quorums of the Seventy. Later, the title "area authority seventy" was shortened to area seventy, which is the title currently in use.

Area seventies serve in the various geographic regions of the world called areas in which the church is governed by area presidencies. Each of the Church's area presidency members usually consist of members of the First and Second Quorums of the Seventy (with the most recent exception, beginning in April 2022, being the presidency of the Europe East Area, later renamed the Eurasian Area, which consists of 3 area seventies).

In 2004, the Fifth Quorum of the Seventy was divided to create the Sixth Quorum.

In May 2005, the Seventh and Eighth quorums were created. The Fourth Quorum, which had served Mexico, Central and South America, had grown to 72 members, and was split into the Fourth and Seventh Quorums. The Eighth Quorum was created to allow better geographic organization of the Third Quorum (not because the number of members exceeded seventy). The Third Quorum previously covered all of Africa, Asia, Australia, Europe and the western islands of the Pacific. The new Eighth Quorum serves Southern Asia, Australia, and the western islands of the Pacific. The Third Quorum continued to serve Africa, northern Asia, and Europe.

By August 2019, with new areas having been created or existing areas consolidated with others, the Third Quorum then included area seventies in Africa and Europe, with the Fourth Quorum including those serving in the Caribbean, Central America, Mexico, and South America Northwest areas. The Fifth Quorum had been composed of those area seventies serving in the North America West and Utah areas, with the Sixth Quorum composed of the North America Central, North America Northeast, North America Southeast, and North America Southwest areas. The Seventh Quorum included those serving in the Brazil and South America South areas, while the Eighth Quorum was composed of area seventies serving in the Asia, Asia North, Philippines, and Pacific areas.

Subsequently, effective June 1, 2020, four new Quorums of the Seventy were created, and the geographical distribution of the ten quorums of area seventies were constituted in the following manner:

- Third Quorum–Africa Central, Africa South, and Africa West areas.
- Fourth Quorum–Asia and Asia North areas.
- Fifth Quorum–Brazil Area.
- Sixth Quorum–Caribbean, Central America, and Mexico areas.
- Seventh Quorum–Eurasian, Europe Central, Europe North, and Middle East/Africa North areas.
- Eighth Quorum–Philippines and Pacific areas.
- Ninth Quorum–South America Northwest and South America South areas;
- Tenth Quorum–North America Central, North America Northeast, and North America Southeast areas.
- Eleventh Quorum–North America Southwest and North America West Areas.
- Twelfth Quorum–Utah Area.

=== Seventies who became apostles or members of the First Presidency ===
	Name	Dates as a seventy	Specific quorum or position as a seventy	Dates in other position(s)
	George A. Smith	1835–39	First Quorum of the Seventy	Quorum of the Twelve Apostles (1839–68); First Presidency (1868–75)
	Richard L. Evans	1938–53	First Council of the Seventy	Quorum of the Twelve Apostles (1953–71)
	Bruce R. McConkie	1946–72	First Council of the Seventy	Quorum of the Twelve Apostles (1972–85)
	Neal A. Maxwell	1974–81	First Council of the Seventy (1974–76); Presidency of the Seventy (1976–81)	Quorum of the Twelve Apostles (1981–2004)
	James E. Faust	1976–78	Presidency of the Seventy	Quorum of the Twelve Apostles (1978–95); First Presidency (1995–2007)
	Alvin R. Dyer	1970–1977	First Quorum of the Seventy (only person to be ordained a seventy after being ordained an apostle)	Apostle (1967–77); First Presidency (1968–70)
	M. Russell Ballard	1976–85	First Quorum of the Seventy; Presidency of the Seventy (1980–85)	Quorum of the Twelve Apostles (1985–2023)
	Robert D. Hales	1976–85	First Quorum of the Seventy	Quorum of the Twelve Apostles (1994–2017)
	Joseph B. Wirthlin	1976–86	First Quorum of the Seventy; Presidency of the Seventy (1986)	Quorum of the Twelve Apostles (1986–2008)
	Richard G. Scott	1977–88	First Quorum of the Seventy; Presidency of the Seventy (1983–88)	Quorum of the Twelve Apostles (1988–2015)
	Jeffrey R. Holland	1989–94	First Quorum of the Seventy	Quorum of the Twelve Apostles (1994–)
	Henry B. Eyring	1992–95	First Quorum of the Seventy	Quorum of the Twelve Apostles (1995–2007); First Presidency (2007–)
	D. Todd Christofferson	1993–2008	First Quorum of the Seventy (1993–2008); Presidency of the Seventy (1998–2008)	Quorum of the Twelve Apostles (2008–2025); First Presidency (2025- )
	Neil L. Andersen	1993–2009	First Quorum of the Seventy (1993–2009); Presidency of the Seventy (2005–09)	Quorum of the Twelve Apostles (2009–)
	Dieter F. Uchtdorf	1994–2004	Second Quorum of the Seventy (1994–96); First Quorum of the Seventy (1996–2004); Presidency of the Seventy (2002–04)	Quorum of the Twelve Apostles (2004–08,2018–); First Presidency (2008–18)
	Quentin L. Cook	1996–2007	Second Quorum of the Seventy (1996–98); First Quorum of the Seventy (1998–2007); Presidency of the Seventy (2007)	Quorum of the Twelve Apostles (2007–)
	David A. Bednar	1997–2004	Area seventy; Fifth Quorum of the Seventy	Quorum of the Twelve Apostles (2004–)
	Ronald A. Rasband	2000–15	First Quorum of the Seventy (2000–15); Presidency of the Seventy (2005–15)	Quorum of the Twelve Apostles (2015–)
	Dale G. Renlund	2000–15	Fifth Quorum of the Seventy (2000–09); First Quorum of the Seventy (2009–15)	Quorum of the Twelve Apostles (2015–)
	Gary E. Stevenson	2008–12	First Quorum of the Seventy (2008–12)	Presiding Bishop (2012–15); Quorum of the Twelve Apostles (2015–)
	Gerrit W. Gong	2010-2018	Presidency of the Seventy (2015–2018); First Quorum of the Seventy (2010–2018); Area seventy, Fifth Quorum of the Seventy (2009–10)	Quorum of the Twelve Apostles (2018–)
	Ulisses Soares	2005-2018	Presidency of the Seventy (2013–2018); First Quorum of the Seventy (2005–2018)	Quorum of the Twelve Apostles (2018–)
	Patrick Kearon	2010-2023	Presidency of the Seventy (2017-2023); First Quorum of the Seventy (2010-2023)	Quorum of the Twelve Apostles (2023- )
	Gérald Caussé	2008-2012	First Quorum of the Seventy (2008-2012); Presiding Bishopric Counselor (2012-2015); Presiding Bishop (2015-2025)	Quorum of the Twelve Apostles (2025- )
84x84	Clark G. Gilbert	2021-2026	General Authority Seventy (2021-2026)	Quorum of the Twelve Apostles (2026- )

=== Other noteworthy seventies ===
Name	Dates as a general, area, or local Seventy (Note: Members called to the seventy continue to hold the priesthood office of seventy after being released from a specific quorum or position. Time as an emeritus general authority not included in this date range.)	Specific quorum or position as a seventy	Significance
Elijah Abel	1836–84	Local seventy	First black seventy
Ángel Abrea	1981–2003 (Note: Released, but retains general authority emeritus status.)	First Quorum of the Seventy (1981–2003); Emeritus general authority (2003–2021)	First resident of Latin America general authority
Joseph Anderson	1976–78	First Quorum of the Seventy (1976–78); Emeritus general authority (1978–92)	Second oldest-lived general authority in LDS Church history (102)
Eduardo Ayala	1990-1995	Second Quorum of the Seventy (1990-1995)	First Chilean general authority and first from western South America
Merrill J. Bateman	1992–94; 1995–2007	Second Quorum of the Seventy (1992–94); First Quorum of the Seventy (1995–2007); Presidency of the Seventy (2003–07); Emeritus general authority (2007–)	Presiding Bishop of the church (1994–95); President of Brigham Young University (1996–2003)
Samuel O. Bennion	1933–46	First Council of the Seventy	
Gladden Bishop	1837–42 (approx)	Local seventy	Abandoned the church in 1842 and established his own Latter Day Saint sect after 1844
Helio R. Camargo	1985-1990	First Quorum of the Seventy	First Brazilian general authority
Clayton M. Christensen	2002-2009	Area Seventy; Sixth Quorum of the Seventy	Professor at Harvard Business School
Kim B. Clark	2007–14; 2015–2019	Area Seventy; Fifth Quorum of the Seventy (2007–14); First Quorum of the Seventy (2015–19)	President of Brigham Young University–Idaho (2005–15); Former dean of Harvard Business School
Massimo De Feo	2013–	Area Seventy; Third Quorum of the Seventy (2013–16); General Authority Seventy (2016–)	First Italian general authority.
Charles A. Didier	1975–2009	First Quorum of the Seventy; Presidency of the Seventy (1992–95; 2001–07); Emeritus general authority (2009-)	First European general authority
Edward Dube	2013–	First Quorum of the Seventy (2013–); Presidency of the Seventy (2024- )	First Zimbabwean and second black African general authority
Paul H. Dunn	1964–89	First Council of the Seventy (1968–76); First Quorum of the Seventy (1964–89); Presidency of the Seventy (1976–80); Emeritus general authority (1989–98)	in 1991, publicly admitted to falsifying and embellishing stories of personal experiences in past sermons and books
John H. Groberg	1976–2005	First Quorum of the Seventy (1976–2005); Presidency of the Seventy (2004–05); Emeritus general authority (2005–)	2001 film The Other Side of Heaven is based on his missionary experiences in Tonga
Zenas H. Gurley	1840–44 (approx)	Local seventy	Led a group of dissenters after 1844 and in 1853 became an apostle in the Reorganized Church of Jesus Christ of Latter Day Saints
James J. Hamula	2008–2017	General Authority Seventy	Most recent General Authority to be excommunicated
Han In Sang	1991–96	Second Quorum of the Seventy (1991–96)	First Korean general authority
Milton R. Hunter	1945–75	First Council of the Seventy	co-author of Ancient America and the Book of Mormon
Jon Huntsman Sr.	1996–2011	Area Seventy; Fifth Quorum of the Seventy	American businessman and philanthropist
W. Rolfe Kerr	1996–2007	Second Quorum of the Seventy (1996–97); First Quorum of the Seventy (1997–2007); Emeritus general authority (2007–)	Commissioner of Church Education (2005–08)
Yoshihiko Kikuchi	1977–2011	First Quorum of the Seventy; Emeritus general authority (2011–)	First resident of Asia general authority
J. Golden Kimball	1892–1938	First Council of the Seventy	Legendary general authority wit
Adney Y. Komatsu	1976–93	First Quorum of the Seventy (1976–93); Emeritus general authority (1993–2011)	First general authority of Asian descent
George P. Lee	1975–89	First Quorum of the Seventy	First Native American general authority; tenure ended due to excommunication.
Augusto A. Lim	1992–97	Second Quorum of the Seventy (1992–97)	First Filipino general authority
Gerald N. Lund	2002–08	Second Quorum of the Seventy	Author of The Work and the Glory novels
J.W. Marriott Jr.	1997–2011	Area Seventy; Sixth Quorum of the Seventy	American hotelier and businessman
Hugo E. Martinez	2009–	Area Seventy (2009–14); Second Quorum of the Seventy (2014–)	First Caribbean general authority and first Puerto Rican general authority
Helvécio Martins	1990–2005	Second Quorum of the Seventy (1990–95)	First general authority of black African descent
James O. Mason	1994–2000	Second Quorum of the Seventy (1994–2000)	Acting Surgeon General of the United States from 1989 to 1990
A. Roger Merrill	2000–2004	Area seventy	General President of the Sunday School (2004–09)
Joseph White Musser	1892–1921	Local seventy	Early leader in the Mormon fundamentalist movement after being excommunicated in 1921
Robert C. Oaks	2000–09	Second Quorum of the Seventy; Presidency of the Seventy (2004–07)	Former commander of Air Training Command and United States Air Forces in Europe
Warren Parrish	1835–37	First Quorum of the Seventy	Scribe for Joseph Smith; apostatized in 1837
Rafael E. Pino	2008–	First Quorum of the Seventy	The first Venezuelan general authority.
Zera Pulsipher	1838–62	First Council of the Seventy	A missionary who preached to Wilford Woodruff; excommunicated in 1862; rebaptized the same year
George Reynolds	1866–1909	Local seventy (1866–90); First Council of the Seventy (1890–1909)	Secretary to the First Presidency; party to U.S. Supreme Court polygamy case Reynolds v. United States
B. H. Roberts	1877–1933	Local seventy (1877–88); First Council of the Seventy (1888–1933)	Prominent Mormon historian and apologist
Cecil O. Samuelson	1994–2011	First Quorum of the Seventy; Presidency of the Seventy (2001–03); Emeritus general authority (2011–)	President of Brigham Young University (2003–14)
Joseph W. Sitati	2004–	Area seventy (2004–09); First Quorum of the Seventy (2009–)	First black African general authority of the church; second general authority of black African descent
Edward Stevenson	1847–97	Local seventy (1847–94); First Council of the Seventy (1894–97)	Widely traveled Mormon missionary
William W. Taylor	1875–84	Local seventy (1875–80); First Council of the Seventy (1880–84)	Son of John Taylor; Mormon politician
Jose A. Teixeira	1997–	Area seventy (1997–2005); First Quorum of the Seventy (2008–)	First Portuguese general authority
Earl C. Tingey	1990–2008	First Quorum of the Seventy; Presidency of the Seventy (1996–2008)	Senior member of the Presidency of the Seventy (2001–08)
John Van Cott	1847–83	Local seventy (1847–62); First Council of the Seventy (1862–83)	Missionary to Scandinavia
W. Christopher Waddell	2011-2015	First Quorum of the Seventy(2011-2015)	Served as second and then first counselor in Presiding Bishopric and since 2025 Presiding Bishop
Benjamin Winchester	1835–44	First Quorum of the Seventy	Editor of first independent Mormon periodical; became a Rigdonite apostle after 1844; ultimately repudiated Mormonism
Richard B. Wirthlin	1996–2001	Second Quorum of the Seventy (1996–2001)	Chief strategist and pollster for Ronald Reagan
Kevin J Worthen	2010–	Area Seventy	President of Brigham Young University (2014–2023)
Joseph Young	1835–81	First Council of the Seventy	Senior and Presiding President of the Seventy from 1835 to 1881 (a position subsequently held by his son Seymour B. Young, grandson Levi E. Young, and great-grandson S. Dilworth Young)

== Current organization ==
As of 2021, the Quorums of the Seventy are organized into twelve quorums with a presidency of seven. The seventy act as emissaries of the Quorum of the Twelve Apostles and First Presidency of the church in organizing, training, proselytizing, and administering to millions of people scattered all across the globe. The seventy are the layer between local church administration and general church administration.

In general, seventies must first be at least elders in the Melchizedek priesthood, but in practice most have previously been ordained to the office of high priest. Seventies, being equal in authority, act under the direction of the First Presidency and the Quorum of the Twelve Apostles as they labor in their apostolic ministry. Members of the LDS Church understand that being "equal in authority" (D&C 107:26) means they preside over the church when the First Presidency and the Quorum of the Twelve are not constituted.

This means that the seventies have the power to do anything required to organize and administer the church, as long as they do so under the direction of the First Presidency or the Quorum of the Twelve (D&C 107:33–34). They do not, as quorums, preside over the church by their own authority unless the First Presidency and Quorum of the Twelve are no longer in existence. Apart from the seven presidents of the seventy, seventies do not hold priesthood keys but are delegated the necessary keys to perform their duties. Seventies hold apostolic authority in the sense of being "especial witnesses of Christ". and the Quorums of the Seventy may become the presiding authority over the church if the First Presidency and the Quorum of the Twelve cease to exist.

=== Presidency of the Seventy ===
Historically, seven members of the First Quorum of the Seventy were called to serve as the Presidency of the Seventy. This precedent was broken, however, when in 2004 Robert C. Oaks of the Second Quorum of the Seventy was sustained to fill the vacancy created by Dieter F. Uchtdorf's call to the Quorum of the Twelve Apostles. The church now states that the seven presidents are drawn from General Authority Seventies.

Historically, members of the Presidency of the Seventy would often serve as heads of various church ecclesiastical departments. This practice changed in 2004, when area presidencies in the United States and Canada were dissolved; these areas were put directly under the jurisdiction of the Presidency of the Seventy.

In April 2018, church leaders announced that, effective August 1, 2018, three-man presidencies composed of General Authority Seventies would once again oversee areas in the US and Canada. These areas will continue to be administered from church headquarters. The church indicated this will enable the Presidency of the Seventy to more fully assist the Quorum of the Twelve Apostles and to fill other assignments as needed.

The Presidency of the Seventy is unique in the church in that not only are there seven members but all seven hold the priesthood "keys" of presidency. The man with the longest tenure of uninterrupted service in the presidency is called to preside over the other six as the presiding president or senior president of the seventy.

- Carl B. Cook (March 31, 2018, Senior President January 17, 2024).
- Marcus B. Nash (January 17, 2024)
- Michael T. Ringwood (August 1, 2024)
- Arnulfo Valenzuela (August 1, 2024)
- Edward Dube (August 1, 2024)
- Kevin R. Duncan (August 1, 2025)
- Benjamin M. Z. Tai (August 1, 2026)

=== First Quorum of the Seventy ===
The First Quorum of the Seventy are general authorities, meaning they have authority throughout the church. They usually serve until their 70th birthday or until their health fails them, at which time they are given emeritus status and released from active service as a general authority.

Members of the First Quorum of the Seventy serve under the direction of the Quorum of the Twelve and the Presidency of the Seventy. They do not generally visit local units of the church, teach or give sermons in church meetings except when given specific assignment. Often, members of this quorum will accompany the Twelve on their visits to missions and stakes throughout the church. Other times, they will be sent to act in behalf of the Quorum of the Twelve to stake conferences and to provide training and support to stakes, missions, areas, and temples. As general authorities, members of the First Quorum are often asked to speak at church general conferences.

=== Second Quorum of the Seventy ===
Members of the Second Quorum of the Seventy serve in the same role to that of the First Quorum. They are general authorities, which means they have authority throughout the church and are frequently asked to speak in general conference. They are typically called to serve for approximately five to six years. Prior to October 2015, upon their release, these men ceased to be general authorities or members of the Second Quorum of the Seventy. However, although no specific change in policy or practice was announced, at the church's general conference in October 2015, those released from the Second Quorum of the Seventy were designated as emeritus general authorities for the first time. One of these men, Bruce A. Carlson, is not 70 years old, having it appear the practice may continue to be related to length of service for their release and emeritus designation, rather than specifically age. Also in October 2015, some former members of the Second Quorum of Seventy who had been released in prior years, received letters from the church's First Presidency designating them as emeritus general authorities. In all cases, they retain the priesthood office of seventy.

=== General Authority Seventies no longer identified by quorum affiliation ===
In 2015, the church stopped publicly differentiating between members of the First and Second Quorums of the Seventy, using the more generic term "General Authority Seventies".

In April 2016, eleven men were called to be General Authority Seventies. However, they were not sustained to a specific quorum.

By April 2016, biographies of all members of both quorums used only the generic designation. Though all general authority seventies still serve in one of those two quorums (First or Second), such affiliations are now no longer publicized, which constituted an official change in church practice.

=== Emeritus general authorities ===
Although no longer fully functioning general authorities, emeritus general authorities may be asked to be temple presidents or mission presidents. Prior to October 2015, with the exception of Eldred G. Smith (Patriarch to the Church) and three other men (who were formerly in the Presiding Bishopric) all emeritus general authorities in church history had served as members of the First Quorum of the Seventy. Although no specific change in policy or practice was announced, at the church's general conference in October 2015, those released from the Second Quorum of the Seventy were designated as emeritus general authorities for the first time. They remain general authorities until their deaths, but an emeritus general authority is not a member of a seventies quorum. John K. Carmack, the former head of the Perpetual Education Fund and W. Rolfe Kerr, a former Church Commissioner of Education, are both emeritus general authorities. Jacob de Jager served as a bishop after he was given emeritus status. In the general conference meeting in which Ezra Taft Benson was first sustained as president of the church, the emeritus general authorities were sustained. However, when Howard W. Hunter was sustained as president of the church the emeritus general authorities were not mentioned in the list of church officials that were sustained.

=== Area Seventies Quorums formed (Third–Twelfth Quorums) ===
Members of the Third through Twelfth Quorums of the Seventy are not general authorities, and generally maintain their non-religious vocations. Unlike apostles and members of the First and Second quorums, they do not relocate to Salt Lake City in order to be close to church headquarters. Members of these quorums are area seventies. As assigned, they carry out the duties typically carried out by members of the First and Second quorums of Seventy, which include reorganizing and creating stakes, training stake presidencies, presiding at stake conferences, serving in area presidencies, touring missions, and training mission presidents. They serve in their callings for approximately six to ten years. Upon their release, they cease to be area seventies and members of a quorum of the seventy, but retain the priesthood office of seventy. They live and serve in the respective areas of the church shown below.

- Third Quorum–Africa Central, Africa Southeast, and Africa West areas.
- Fourth Quorum–Asia and Asia North areas.
- Fifth Quorum–Brazil area.
- Sixth Quorum–Caribbean, Central America, and Mexico areas.
- Seventh Quorum–Europe, Europe East, and Middle East/Africa North areas.
- Eighth Quorum–Pacific and Philippines areas.
- Ninth Quorum–South America Northwest and South America South areas.
- Tenth Quorum–North America Central, North America Northeast, and North America Southeast areas.
- Eleventh Quorum–North America Southwest and North America West areas.
- Twelfth Quorum–Utah area.

=== Sealing power ===
Members of the First and Second Quorums of Seventy receive the sealing power which authorizes them to seal husbands to wives, and children to their parents, in any of the church's temples. Members of the other Quorums of the Seventy do not receive this as part of their calling. The authority was first given to members of the First Council of the Seventy on 12 June 1964 under church president David O. McKay and expanded to other General Authority Seventies upon their calling to that office on 3 October 1975.
