= Quentin L. Cook =

American religious leader

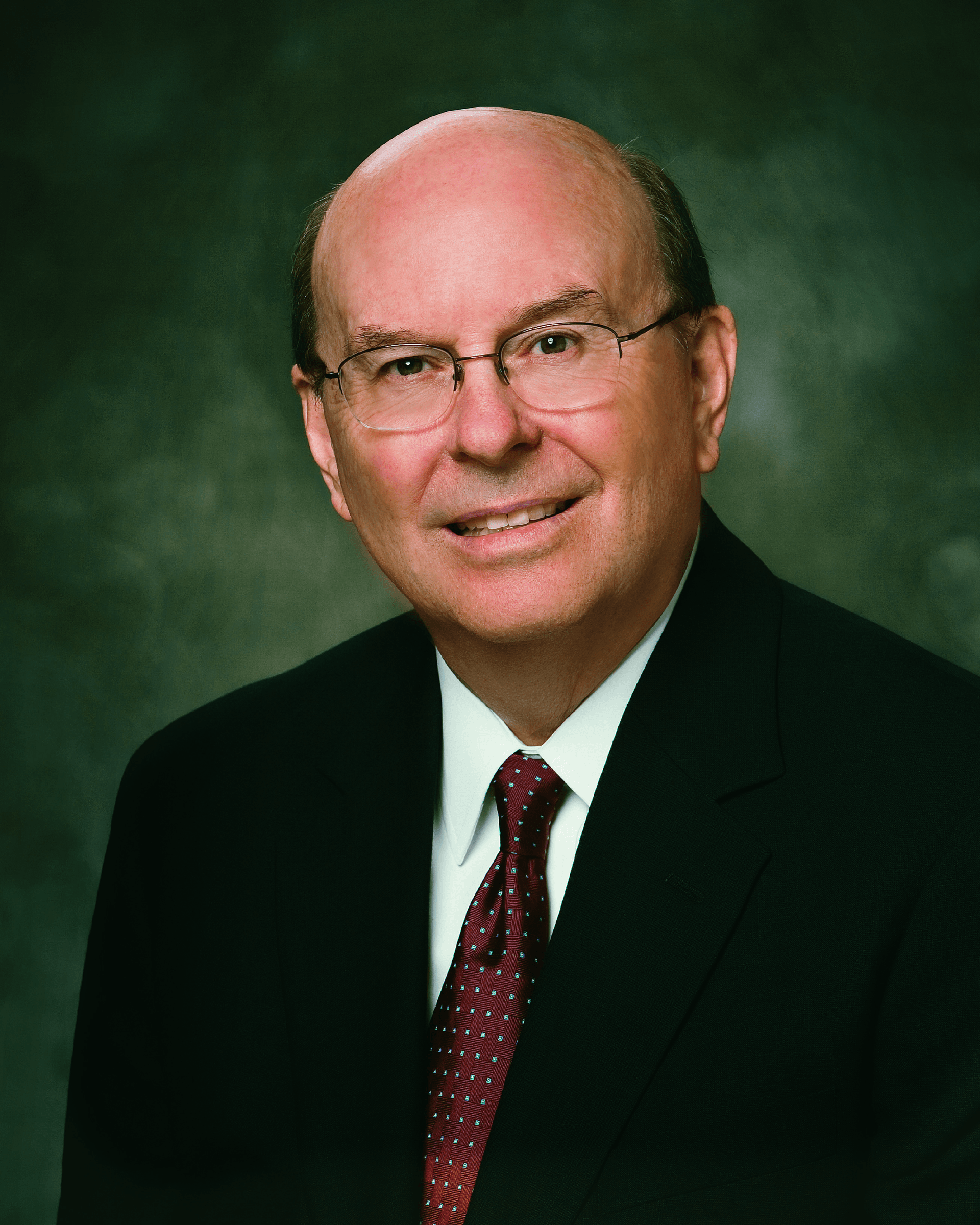

Quorum of the Twelve Apostles
- October 6, 2007

LDS Church Apostle
- October 11, 2007
- Called by: Gordon B. Hinckley
- Reason: Death of James E. Faust; Henry B. Eyring added to First Presidency

Presidency of the Seventy
- August 1, 2007 – October 6, 2007
- End reason: Called to the Quorum of the Twelve Apostles

First Quorum of the Seventy
- April 5, 1998 – October 6, 2007
- End reason: Called to the Quorum of the Twelve Apostles

Second Quorum of the Seventy
- April 6, 1996 – April 5, 1998
- End reason: Transferred to the First Quorum of the Seventy

Personal details
- Born: Quentin LaMar Cook; September 8, 1940 (age 85); Logan, Utah, United States
- Education: Utah State University (B.S.); Stanford University (J.D.)
- Spouse(s): Mary Gaddie (m. 1962)
- Children: 3

Quentin LaMar Cook (born September 8, 1940) is a member of the Quorum of the Twelve Apostles in the Church of Jesus Christ of Latter-day Saints (LDS Church). Currently, he is the fifth most senior apostle in the church. Prior to his calling as an Apostle, he worked as a lawyer and business executive.

== Biographical background ==
Born in Logan, Utah, Cook is among three children of Bernice Kimball and J. Vernon Cook. He is a great-great grandson of LDS Church apostle Heber C. Kimball and great-grandson of David Patten Kimball.

Raised in Logan, Cook attended Logan High School, where he participated in many sports, including football, basketball, baseball, and track. At Logan High, he was a teammate of future NFL great Merlin Olsen.

From 1960 to 1962, Cook served as an LDS Church missionary in England, where he and Jeffrey R. Holland served as companions, with Marion D. Hanks as mission president. After his return, he married his high school sweetheart, Mary Gaddie, in the Logan Utah Temple on November 30, 1962. He graduated from Utah State University in 1963 with a bachelor's degree in political science and from Stanford Law School in 1966.

The Cooks moved to Hillsborough, California, where they had three children. Cook worked for 27 years as a corporate attorney, becoming a managing partner of Carr, McClellan, Ingersoll, Thompson and Horn in the San Francisco Bay area. Later in his career, he served as president and chief executive officer of California Healthcare System (CHS) for three years and then as vice chairman of Sutter Health System. Cook did pro bono work as a city attorney for 14 years.

During his legal and executive career in California’s healthcare sector, Cook was involved in hospital privatization efforts that drew some public criticism at the time.

== LDS Church service ==
Within the LDS Church, Cook has served as a bishop, counselor in a stake presidency, president of the church's San Francisco California Stake, regional representative, and area seventy.

Cook was called as a general authority and member of the Second Quorum of the Seventy on April 6, 1996. He was transferred to the First Quorum of the Seventy on April 5, 1998. He was appointed as a member of the Presidency of the Seventy on August 1, 2007. As a general authority, Cook served in the presidency in the church's Philippines Area, as president of the Pacific and North America Northwest areas, and as executive director of the Missionary Department.

On October 6, 2007, Cook was sustained as a member of the Quorum of the Twelve Apostles, filling a vacancy created by Henry B. Eyring being appointed to the First Presidency, following the death of James E. Faust. As a member of the Quorum of the Twelve, Cook is accepted by the church as a prophet, seer, and revelator.

== Works ==
- "Partnering with Our Friends from Other Faiths", Future of Mormonism, Patheos, 9 August 2010

== See also ==
- Council on the Disposition of the Tithes

== Notes ==
The Church of Jesus Christ of Latter-day Saints titles
Preceded by David A. Bednar	Quorum of the Twelve Apostles; October 6, 2007 –	Succeeded by D. Todd Christofferson
