= William Henry Kimball =

General William Henry Kimball
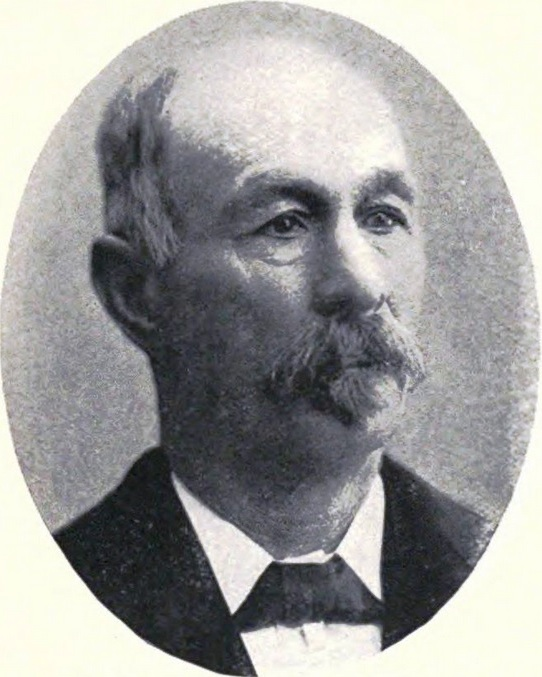

Military career
- Service/branch: Utah militia
- Rank: Brigadier-general

Personal details
- Born: William Henry Kimball; April 10, 1826; Mendon, New York, United States
- Died: December 30, 1907 (aged 81); Coalville, Utah, United States
- Resting place: brigadier-general of Utah militia.
- Spouse(s): 5
- Children: 25
- Parents: Heber C. Kimball; Vilate Murray

William Henry Kimball (April 10, 1826 – December 30, 1907) was a Mormon pioneer and was the oldest son of Heber C. Kimball, an early Latter-day Saint leader.

Kimball was born in Mendon, New York. He earned his place in Latter-day Saint pioneer history for his bravery and gallantry in defending his family and the Latter-day Saints. Kimball served as a general in the Utah Militia and led his men in the Indian wars and handcart pioneer rescue. As one of "Brigham's Boys", he was on call to serve whenever and wherever Brigham Young and the other Latter-day Saint leaders needed minutemen to protect the pioneers. Kimball settled in Parley's Park, where his stage station and hotel gained notoriety with travelers, including Mark Twain. Like many early Latter-day Saints, Kimball practiced plural marriage and had five wives and twenty-five children. (He was eventually divorced from two of his wives.) His house and barn stand to this day at Kimball's Junction near Park City, Utah.

Kimball was a missionary for the Church of Jesus Christ of Latter-day Saints in England from 1854 to 1856.

Kimball died in Coalville, Utah.
