= Richard Ian Kimball =

American sports historian

Richard Ian Kimball is a professor of history at Brigham Young University (BYU). He is a leading expert on the history of sports, especially as it relates to the Latter-day Saints. His book Sports in Zion: Mormon Recreation 1890-1940 was published by the University of Illinois Press and has been reviewed by such widely recognized journals as the Western Political Quarterly and the American Historical Review. Essentially the same book has also been marketed by Deseret Book under the title To Make True Latter-day Saints: Mormon Recreation in the Progressive Era.

Kimball's Sports in Zion has been viewed by some as a misnamed book. It studies much more than sports, but all non-religious movements by the Latter-day Saints during the age. It covers such things as the movement to adopt the Boy Scouting movement by the LDS Church, including the support of such by Eugene Roberts and the initial opposition by B. H. Roberts, who was persuaded to support the adoption of the Boy Scouts by Eugene Roberts' arguments.

Kimball is the son of James L. Kimball Jr., who for 25 years was an employee of the LDS Church History Department, and is the grandson of J. LeRoy Kimball, who was the first president of Nauvoo Restoration, Inc. and a leading figure in the rebuilding of the historic buildings of Nauvoo. Kimball is also a descendant of Heber C. Kimball.

Kimball received his bachelor's degree from BYU in American Studies and then received a master's degree and Ph.D. both in history from Purdue University. He has been a professor at BYU since 1998.

Although Kimball has heavily studied Mormon sport history, he has also studied other facets of Mormon social history and has done studies of sport history not related to Mormons. He along with Gary Daynes produced a documentary and wrote the article "By Their Fruits Ye Shall Know Them: A Cultural History of Orchard Life in Utah Valley" which was published in the Western Historical Quarterly. In addition they produced the film The Best Crop specifically about the orchards of Orem, Utah. He also wrote an article for BYU Studies entitled All Hail To Christmas: Mormon Pioneers Holiday Celebrations.

In his writings Kimball has dealt with how sports and race relations interplay in Utah history.

Kimball has also contributed articles to such publications as the Nine: The Journal of Baseball History and Culture and Chicago Sports.

In 2017 his work Legends Never Die: Athletes and their Afterlives in Modern America was published by the Syracuse University Press. It was described as a "highly engaging book".

Kimball is a Latter-day Saint.
