= Joseph Young =

Early Mormon leader (1797–1881)

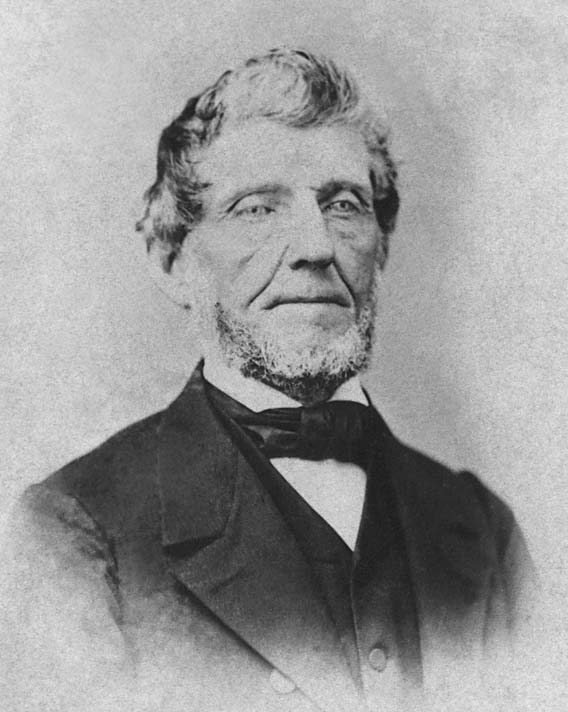

First Seven Presidents of the Seventy
- March 1, 1835 – July 16, 1881
- Called by: Joseph Smith

Personal details
- Born: April 7, 1797; Hopkinton, Massachusetts, United States
- Died: July 16, 1881 (aged 84); Salt Lake City, Utah Territory, United States
- Resting place: Salt Lake City Cemetery; 40.777°N 111.858°W
- Spouse(s): Jane Adeline Bicknell; Lucinda Allen; Lydia Caroline Hagar; Mary Ann Huntley; Sarah Jane Snow; Elizabeth Stevens
- Children: 21 (11 with first wife and 10 with plural wives)
- Parents: John Young; Abigail Nabby Howe

Joseph Young (April 7, 1797 – July 16, 1881) was an early convert to the Latter Day Saint movement and was a missionary and longtime general authority of the Church of Jesus Christ of Latter-day Saints (LDS Church). He was an elder brother of Brigham Young.

== Early life ==
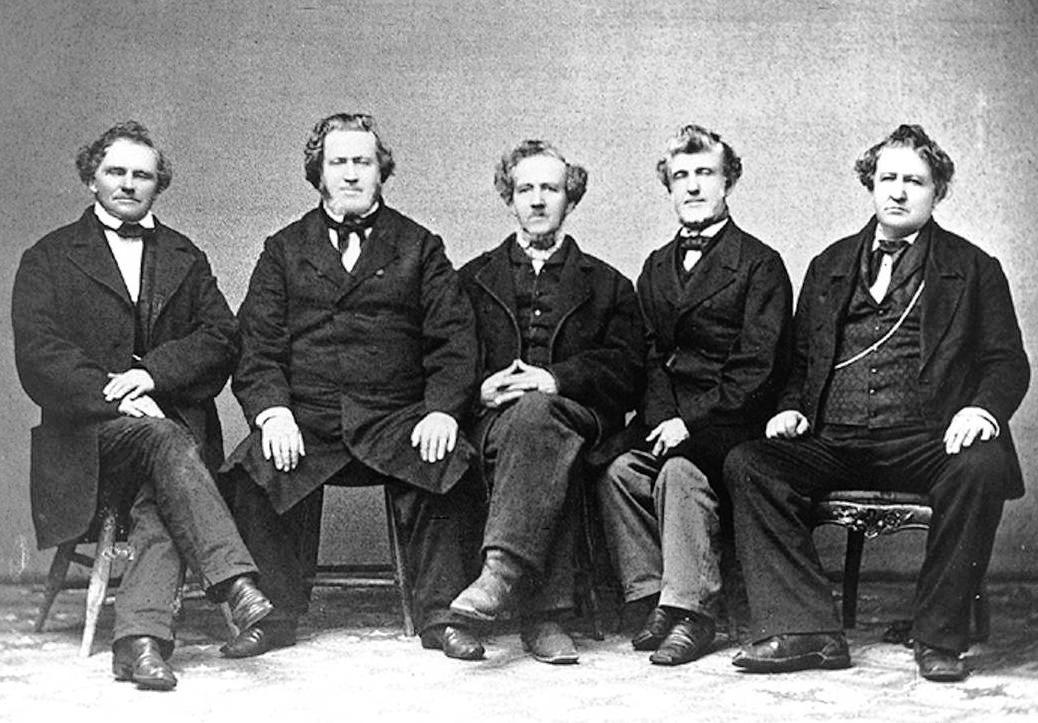
The five sons of John and Nabby Young From left to right: Lorenzo Dow, Brigham, Phineas H., Joseph, and John.

Young was born in Hopkinton, Massachusetts, on April 7, 1797, the seventh child born to John Young and Abigail Howe.

In 1830, while he was a preacher for the Methodist Church in Upper Canada, Young was introduced to the doctrine of the Church of Christ by his younger brother Brigham. Joseph eventually abandoned the Methodist faith and was baptized a member of the Church of Christ by Daniel Bowen in Columbia, Pennsylvania, on April 6, 1832; Brigham followed his brother and became a member of the church one week later. Later in April 1832, Joseph was ordained to the priesthood office of elder by Ezra Landon. Immediately following his ordination, Young began a mission for the church, preaching in Canada in the spring and summer of 1832 with his brother Phineas for four months.

== Missions ==
In the fall of 1832, Young joined the gathering of Latter Day Saints in Kirtland, Ohio, where he met Joseph Smith, the founder of the church. Shortly after arriving in Kirtland, Smith asked Young to depart on another mission for the church to Upper Canada, which he served over the winter months of 1832 and 1833 with his brother Brigham.

On February 18, 1834, Young married Jane Adeline Bicknell in Geneseo, New York. The couple would eventually have eleven children, including daughters Jane Adeline, Julia Ann Vilate, and Chloe Eliza, as well as sons Joseph Bicknell, Seymour Bicknell, and Marcus LeGrand.

=== Seventy ===
Young accompanied Joseph Smith and others in a journey to Independence, Missouri, in 1834 as part of Zion's Camp. In 1835, Smith selected Young to be one of the leaders of the Seventy of the church. Young was ordained to the Seventy on February 28. He then became a president of the First Quorum of the Seventy on March 1, 1835. After it was discovered that the senior president of the Seventy, Hazen Aldrich, had previously been ordained to the office of high priest, Aldrich surrendered his position in the quorum. As a result, Young became the senior or seventh president of the Seventy. He would retain this position in the church from 1835 until his death.

As a Seventy, Young served several more missions for the church, including one to New York and Massachusetts with Burr Riggs in 1835 and one to his relatives in the eastern United States with his brother Brigham in 1836.

Young participated in many significant events in early Latter Day Saint history. He was present at the dedication of the Kirtland Temple in 1836 and participated in the Kirtland Safety Society. Young was also present at Haun's Mill, Missouri, when it was attacked by those who opposed the Mormon presence in Missouri. He left Missouri with the Latter Day Saints in consequence of the extermination order which had been issued by Lilburn W. Boggs. Young relocated Quincy, Illinois, for a brief time before settling in Nauvoo, Illinois, in 1840, where he worked as a painter. Young also joined the Nauvoo Legion in 1842.

Young received his endowment in Nauvoo on February 3, 1844, just months before Joseph Smith was killed. He was selected by Smith as an inaugural member of the Council of Fifty on March 1, 1845. At the time Smith was killed, Young was campaigning on behalf of Smith's bid for the presidency of the United States.

Like many early Latter Day Saints, Young practiced plural marriage. On January 16, 1846, he was married to Lucinda Allen and Lydia Caroline Hagar, in the Nauvoo Temple. Soon to follow was Mary Ann Huntley on February 6, 1846. Later, on 7 April 1868 he married Sarah Jane Snow, and Elizabeth Stevens on November 28, 1868. Young would eventually father a total of twenty-one children.

=== Later life in Utah ===
Young and his four wives left Illinois in 1846 and settled in Winter Quarters, Nebraska, and later Carterville, Iowa. He and his wives left Carterville in 1850 to join the Latter Day Saints who had followed his brother Brigham to the Salt Lake Valley in Utah Territory. Young arrived in Salt Lake City in September 1850. The Youngs travelled in the William Snow/Joseph Young Company, with Young acting as a captain of the group.

In 1870, Young served a final mission for the church to the British Isles. He also served in the Utah Territorial legislature. He died in Salt Lake City on July 16, 1881, at the age of 84. At the time of his death, Young had served as a general authority or a missionary of the church for nearly fifty years.

== See also ==
- S. Dilworth Young: great-grandson
- Seymour B. Young: son
