= J. Golden Kimball =

American Church of Jesus Christ of Latter-day Saints leader

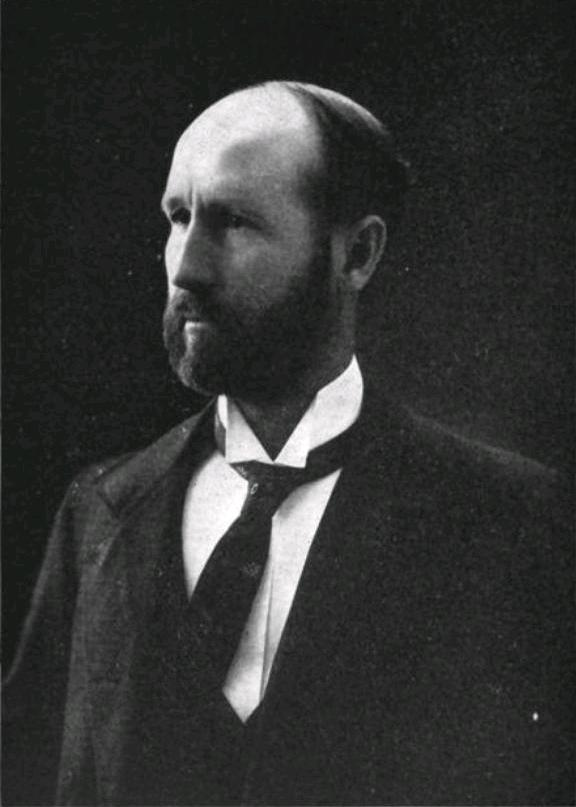

First Council of the Seventy
- April 5, 1892 – September 2, 1938
- Called by: Wilford Woodruff

Personal details
- Born: Jonathan Golden Kimball; June 9, 1853; Salt Lake City, Utah Territory, United States
- Died: September 2, 1938 (aged 85); Nevada desert, United States
- Resting place: Salt Lake City Cemetery; 40°46′37.92″N 111°51′28.8″W
- Parents: Heber C. Kimball; Christeene Golden Kimball

Jonathan Golden Kimball (June 9, 1853 – September 2, 1938) was a leader of The Church of Jesus Christ of Latter-day Saints (LDS Church), serving as a member of the First Council of the Seventy from 1892 until his death in 1938. He is considered one of the most colorful and beloved of the church's general authorities. In the years since his death, "Uncle Golden" has become a near legendary character among church members, possibly comparable to what Will Rogers or Mark Twain are to the general American public.

== Early life ==
Kimball was born in Salt Lake City, Utah Territory, the son of apostle Heber C. Kimball and Christeene Golden Kimball. He was one of sixty-five children fathered by Heber C. Kimball, a practitioner of the early LDS doctrine of plural marriage. Kimball was one of the first generation of Latter-day Saints to be born after the Mormon pioneers' exodus to Utah in 1847, and was familiar with the pioneer experience and the expansion of Latter-day Saint settlements in the Intermountain Region.

Kimball was the oldest of his mother's three children and was fifteen when his father died. To support the family, he left school and became a mule driver. His mother kept boarders as well as sewing for Zion's Co-operative Mercantile Institution or ZCMI, one of the first department stores in the United States. In 1876, he and his brother, Elias, established a horse and cattle ranch in Meadowville, Rich County, and moved there with their immediate family. He cut timber during the winter for use in the construction of the church's Logan Utah Temple and also worked as superintendent of a lumber mill. After hearing an 1881 speech by educator Karl G. Maeser, the Kimball brothers decided to leave their ranch and return to school. They attended Brigham Young Academy in Provo, receiving certificates in Bookkeeping and Commercial Arithmetic (commercial program diplomas) in June 1881.

== Service as a missionary ==
After completing his education, Kimball was called as a missionary to the southern United States on April 6, 1883, by LDS Church president John Taylor. Kimball remembered that he:

... left Chattanooga, Tennessee, with twenty-seven elders assigned to the Southern States. There were all kinds of elders in the company—farmers, cowboys, few educated—a pretty hard-looking crowd, and I was one of that kind. The elders preached, and talked, and sang, and advertised loudly their calling as preachers. I kept still for once in my life; I hardly opened my mouth. I saw a gentleman on the train. I can visualize that man now. I didn't know who he was. He knew we were a band of Mormon elders. The elders soon commenced a discussion and argument with the stranger, and before he got through they were in grave doubt about their message of salvation. He gave them a training that they never forgot. That man proved to be (LDS Mission) President B. H. Roberts.

For the first year of his mission Kimball served in Virginia.

Kimball served in a time of great persecution and some violence in the South. He was serving in the mission office in Chattanooga, as mission secretary, when three LDS elders were killed by a mob as they held services on Sunday, August 10, 1884. Although he developed a case of malaria, which troubled him for many years, Kimball remained active in the mission until his release in the spring of 1885.

Kimball returned to ranching in the Bear Lake Valley and married Jennie Knowlton, a daughter of John Q. and Ellen Smith Knowlton. The couple had six children, three boys and three girls. While living in the Bear Lake area, Kimball served as a home missionary, somewhat like modern ward missionaries. Shortly later, Kimball was made the head of the Young Men's Mutual Improvement Association for the Bear Lake Stake (which included the far South-east corner of Idaho, as well as some of Rich County, Utah). A short time later, Kimball, along with his brothers, Newel and Elias, set up a business called Kimball Brothers with branches in Montpelier, Idaho and Logan, Utah and at this time Kimball moved to Logan.

In 1891, he was called to return as president of the Southern States Mission. In a conference address in 1927, he summarized his experiences in the southern states:

I was in the South three years, presiding over the mission, under the greatest hardships and the greatest difficulties I have ever endured in all my life ... yet I have had the greatest joy and the greatest peace and happiness.

== Service as a Seventy ==
In 1892, while still serving as mission president, Kimball was called to be a general authority and member of the First Council of Seventy. He humorously attributed his new position to his father's influence:

Some people say a person receives a position in this church through revelation, and others say they get it through inspiration, but I say they get it through relation. If I hadn't been related to Heber C. Kimball I wouldn't have been a damn thing in this church.

Kimball served as a general authority for forty-six years. During the time, it was customary for church leaders to frequently travel to Mormon communities in the western territories and states. Kimball gave hundreds of sermons, sparkling with humor and wit. A tall lean man, his voice was described as high and rasping. He was well known for swearing good naturedly from the pulpit, sprinkling "damns" and "hells" into his speeches. Although the habit was of concern to other church leaders, and subjected him to counsel from church president Heber J. Grant on many occasions, this common touch made Kimball one of the most beloved leaders in the church's history. Asked how he could get away with the way he spoke, Kimball is said to have replied: Hell, they can't excommunicate me. I repent too damned fast.

This "folksy" style was backed by intelligence and deep spirituality, and Latter-day Saints would travel long distances to hear him speak at conferences.

"J. Golden" stories have become a type of folklore for members of the LDS Church. One of the best known has LDS Church president Grant writing a "clean" radio speech for Kimball and ordering him to read it. However, once on the air, Kimball struggled with Grant's handwriting and finally exclaimed, Hell, Heber, I can't read this damn thing. Most of these stories are apocryphal.

J. Golden was the one high dignitary who could keep any audience from sleep. They called him the Will Rogers of the Church. That was a mistake. He should never have been compared with anyone, because J. Golden was an original. Throughout the Mormon Country he is already a legend. Anecdotes and stories float through every Mormon hamlet, and there is even a kind of fraternity of storytellers specializing in J. Golden stories. But like all originals, he defies transcription. He was himself, no less, no more, and nobody knew it better than he.

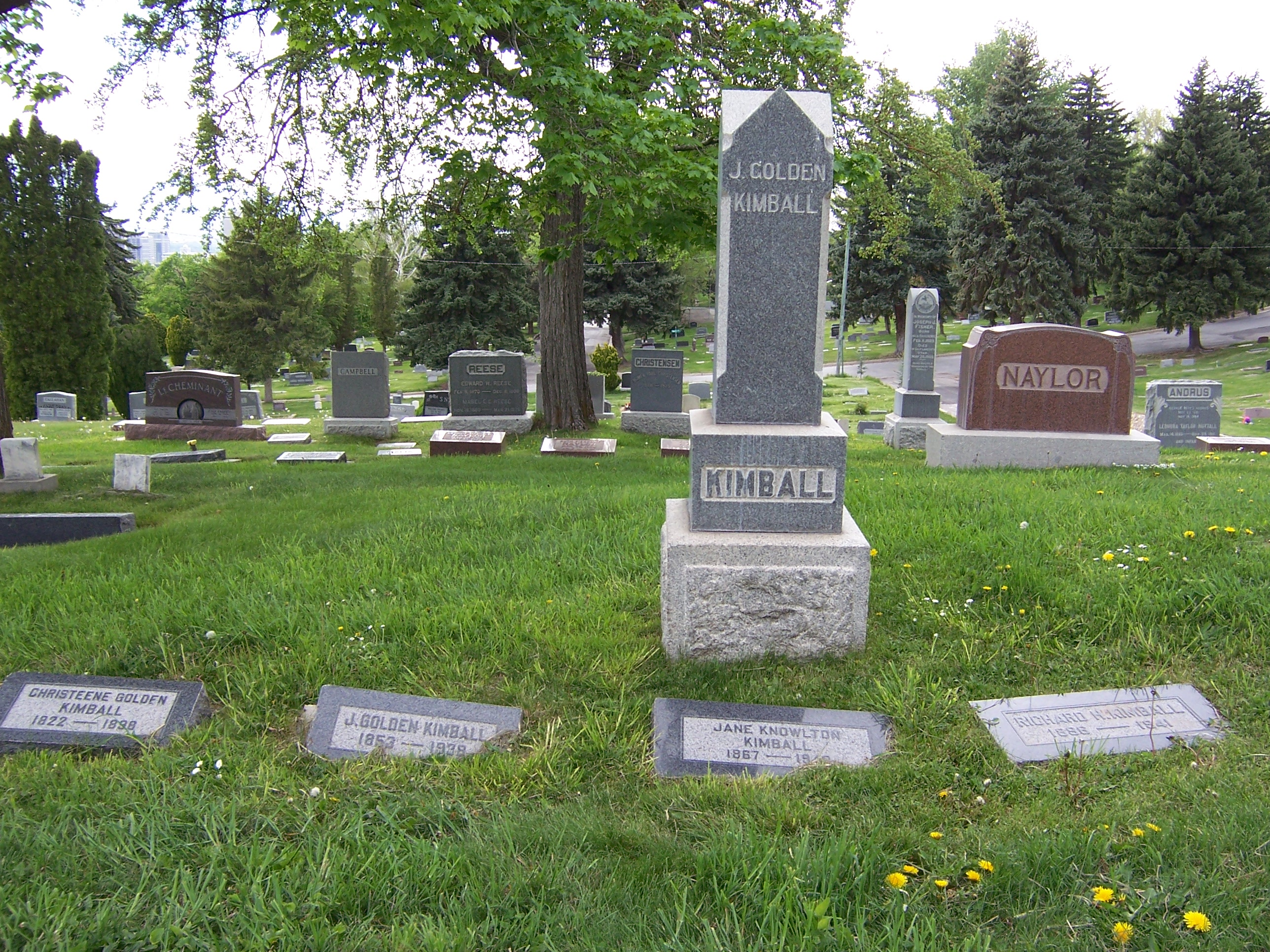
Grave marker of J. Golden Kimball. See also headstone:

Following the death of B. H. Roberts in 1933, Kimball became the senior President of the Seventy. He still held this position when he was killed in 1938, at the age of eighty-five, in a single-vehicle automobile accident in the Nevada desert 50 miles (80 km) east of Reno. He was buried at Salt Lake City Cemetery.

== See also ==
- Mormon folklore
