= Seymour B. Young =

American physician

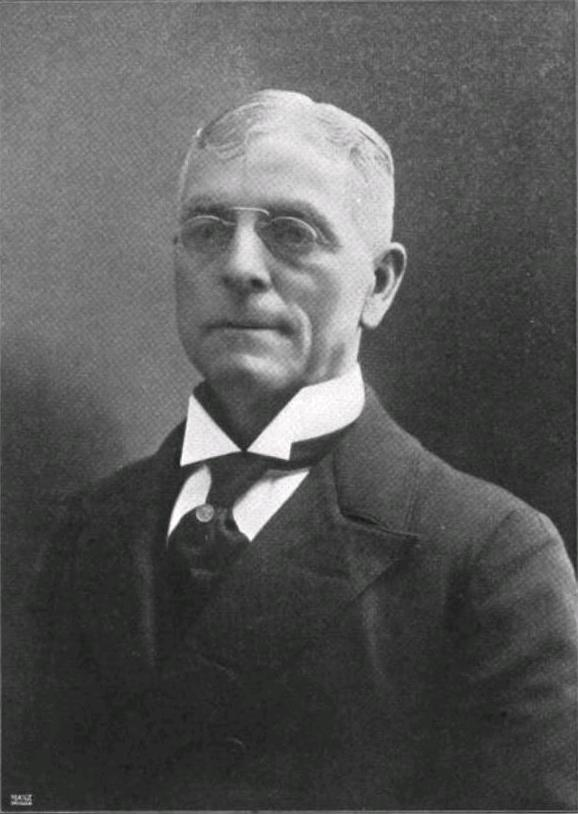

First Seven Presidents of the Seventy
- October 14, 1882 – December 15, 1924
- Called by: John Taylor

Personal details
- Born: Seymour Bicknell Young Sr. October 3, 1837; Kirtland, Ohio, United States
- Died: December 15, 1924 (aged 87); Salt Lake City, Utah, United States

Seymour Bicknell Young Sr. (October 3, 1837 – December 15, 1924) was a general authority of the Church of Jesus Christ of Latter-day Saints from 1882 until his death.

== Biography ==
Young was born to Latter Day Saint converts Joseph Young and Jane A. Bicknell in Kirtland, Ohio. His uncle was Latter Day Saint apostle Brigham Young. As an infant, Seymour Young was present with his mother at the Haun's Mill massacre. He moved with his family to Nauvoo, Illinois in 1839 and then to the Salt Lake Valley as Mormon pioneers in 1850.

From 1857 to 1858, Young served as a Mormon missionary in England, working primarily in Yorkshire and Lincolnshire. He was called home to Utah Territory prematurely because of the Utah War. In 1870 and 1871 Young accompanied his father on a mission to England and Scotland; the two also preached in and visited relatives in Ohio and New York.

In 1874, Young graduated with a medical degree from University Medical College in New York City; shortly thereafter, he began practicing medicine in Salt Lake City.

In 1882, Young became a member of the First Seven Presidents of the Seventy. He became the senior president of the seven-man council in 1892, and retained this position until his death. He also became a member of the general board of the Deseret Sunday School Union.

On October 9, 1884, Young became one of the last individuals added to the church's Council of Fifty. Young practiced plural marriage and was married to two wives and was the father of 13 children.

Young died of nephritis in Salt Lake City, Utah.

== See also ==
- Clifford E. Young : son
- S. Dilworth Young : grandson
