= List of members of the Council of Fifty =

In 1844, Joseph Smith, president of the Church of Jesus Christ of Latter Day Saints, established the Council of Fifty, a Latter Day Saint organization, in order to symbolize and represent a future theocratic or theodemocratic "Kingdom of God" on the earth. Following Smith's death, his successor, Brigham Young, as President of the Church of Jesus Christ of Latter-day Saints (LDS Church), hoped to continue the Council of Fifty in order to create this Kingdom in preparation for the Millennium and the Second Coming of Jesus. The political Kingdom of God, organized around the Council of Fifty, was meant to be a force of peace and order in the midst of this chaos.

Following the death of Smith, some members of the council continued on as members of the Council of Fifty, under the leadership of Brigham Young and within the Church of Jesus Christ of Latter-day Saints, while some members left to join or form various other sects in the Latter Day Saint movement.

== Church of Jesus Christ of Latter Day Saints ==
This table includes individuals who joined the Council of Fifty prior to June 27, 1844, under the leadership of Joseph Smith, president of the Church of Jesus Christ of Latter Day Saints (as named in 1844). However, all the included individuals are regarded as early leaders of the church by the Church of Jesus Christ of Latter-day Saints, the Reorganized Church of Jesus Christ of Latter Day Saints (now the Community of Christ) and other Latter Day Saint sects.

Members of the Council of Fifty of the Church of Jesus Christ of Latter Day Saints
Name	Birth	Death	Admitted	Released/Dropped	Notes
George J. Adams	ca. 1811	May 11, 1880	Between Mar. 14 and Apr. 11, 1844	February 4, 1845	After Joseph Smith's death, Adams joined with James Strang and the Church of Jesus Christ of Latter Day Saints (Strangite). He broke away from Strang and formed the Church of the Messiah, a sect that traveled to and settled in Palestine in the late 1850s.
Almon W. Babbitt	October 9, 1812	September 7, 1856	Between Mar. 14 and Apr. 11, 1844	September 7, 1856	Babbitt was the first secretary and treasurer of the Territory of Utah. He was killed in a raid by Cheyenne Native Americans in Nebraska Territory while traveling on government business between Utah and Washington, D.C.
Alexander Badlam	November 28, 1809	December 1, 1894	March 11, 1844	February 4, 1845	Readmitted to Council and attended its 1851 meetings. Dropped again in 1867–1868 period.
Samuel Bent	July 19, 1778	August 16, 1846	March 19, 1844	August 16, 1846	Bent also served as a colonel in the Nauvoo Legion.
John M. Bernhisel	June 23, 1799	September 28, 1881	March 11, 1844	September 28, 1881	Was a Delegate to U.S. House of Representatives from Utah twice, from March 4, 1851 – March 3, 1859 and March 4, 1861 – March 3, 1863
Edward Bonney	August 26, 1807	February 4, 1864	Between Mar. 14 and Apr. 11, 1844	February 4, 1845	One of only three members of the Council who was not a member of the Latter Day Saint movement. Known for his investigation of the "Banditti of the Prairie", which resulted in an investigation of the torture-murder of George Davenport.
Uriah Brown	May 9, 1784	March 22, 1853	March 19, 1844	February 4, 1845	One of only three members of the Council who was not a member of the Latter Day Saint movement. After his expulsion from the Quorum, he returned to Utah in the 1850s and demonstrated an invention of "liquid fireworks" to the Council of fifty.
Reynolds Cahoon	April 30, 1790	April 29, 1861	March 10, 1844	April 29, 1861	Attended provisional meeting of March 10, 1844
William H. Clayton	July 17, 1814	December 4, 1879	March 11, 1844	December 4, 1879	Attended provisional meeting on March 10, 1844, and appointed clerk. Officially reappointed Clerk of the Kingdom on March 13, 1844.
Joseph W. Coolidge	May 31, 1814	January 13, 1871	April 18, 1844	After 1848	
Alpheus Cutler	February 29, 1784	June 10, 1864	March 11, 1844	Possibly 1848–1849	Attended provisional meeting of March 10, 1844
Marenus G. Eaton	March 15, 1808	September 1861	Between Mar. 14 and Apr. 11, 1844	February 4, 1845	One of only three members of the Council who was not a member of the Latter Day Saint movement.
James Emmett	February 22, 1803	December 28, 1852	March 13, 1844	February 4, 1845	
Amos Fielding	July 16, 1792	August 5, 1875	March 11, 1844	August 5, 1875	Attended provisional meeting of March 10, 1844
Joseph Fielding	March 26, 1797	December 19, 1863	Between Mar. 14 and Apr. 11, 1844	December 19, 1863	
Jedediah M. Grant	February 21, 1816	December 1, 1856	May 6, 1844	December 1, 1856	
John P. Greene	September 3, 1793	September 20, 1844	March 26, 1844	September 20, 1844	
Peter Haws	February 17, 1795	February 1, 1860	March 11, 1844	After November 13, 1846	
David S. Hollister	June 4, 1808	October 1851	April 18, 1844	Possibly December 25, 1846	
Orson Hyde	January 8, 1805	November 28, 1878	March 13, 1844	November 28, 1878	
Samuel James	January 18, 1806	after 1880	March 19, 1844	February 4, 1845	
Benjamin F. Johnson	July 28, 1818	November 18, 1905	Between Mar. 14 and Apr. 11, 1844	November 18, 1905	
Heber C. Kimball	June 14, 1801	June 22, 1868	March 11, 1844	June 22, 1868	Attended provisional meeting of March 10, 1844
Cornelius P. Lott	September 22, 1798	July 6, 1850	Between Mar. 14 and Apr. 11, 1844	July 6, 1850	
Amasa M. Lyman	March 30, 1813	February 4, 1877	Between Mar. 14 and Apr. 11, 1844	February 4, 1877	Possibly dropped after January 25, 1867; otherwise technically remained a member until death.
William Marks	November 15, 1792	May 22, 1872	March 19, 1844	February 4, 1845	
George Miller	November 25, 1794	August 27, 1856	March 10, 1844	After December 26, 1846	Attended provisional meeting of March 10, 1844
John D. Parker	November 22, 1799	February 27, 1891	March 19, 1844	June 24, 1882	Released due to old age
W. W. Phelps	February 17, 1792	March 7, 1872	March 11, 1844	March 7, 1872	Attended provisional meeting of March 10, 1844
Orson Pratt	September 19, 1811	October 3, 1881	March 11, 1844	October 3, 1881	Attended provisional meeting of March 10, 1844
Parley P. Pratt	April 12, 1807	May 13, 1857	March 11, 1844	May 13, 1857	Attended provisional meeting of March 10, 1844
Charles C. Rich	August 21, 1809	November 17, 1883	Between Mar. 14 and Apr. 11, 1844	June 24, 1882	Released due to old age
Levi Richards	April 14, 1799	June 18, 1876	March 11, 1844	June 18, 1876	
Willard Richards	June 24, 1804	March 11, 1854	March 11, 1844	March 11, 1854	Attended provisional meeting on March 10, 1844, and appointed chairman. Released as provisional chairman and made recorder on March 13, 1844.
Sidney Rigdon	February 19, 1793	July 14, 1876	March 19, 1844	February 4, 1845	
O. Porter Rockwell	June 28, 1813	June 9, 1878	March 19, 1844	June 9, 1878	
Elias Smith	September 6, 1804	June 24, 1888	Between Mar. 14 and Apr. 11, 1844	June 24, 1888	
George A. Smith	June 26, 1817	September 1, 1875	March 11, 1844	September 1, 1875	Attended provisional meeting of March 10, 1844
Hyrum Smith	February 9, 1800	June 27, 1844	March 11, 1844	June 27, 1844	Attended provisional meeting of March 10, 1844
John Smith	July 16, 1781	May 23, 1854	Between Mar. 14 and Apr. 11, 1844	May 23, 1854	Uncle to Joseph Smith Jr. Later Ordained Patriarch to the Church.
Joseph Smith	December 23, 1805	June 27, 1844	March 11, 1844	June 27, 1844	Attended provisional meeting on March 10, 1844. Appointed standing chairman March 13, 1844. Ordained and anointed Prophet, Priest, and King over Israel on Earth on April 11, 1844.
William Smith	March 13, 1811	November 13, 1893	April 25, 1844	After September 9, 1845	
Erastus Snow	November 9, 1818	May 27, 1888	March 11, 1844	May 27, 1888	
Orson Spencer	March 14, 1802	October 15, 1855	March 19, 1844	October 15, 1855	
John Taylor	November 1, 1808	July 25, 1887	March 11, 1844	July 25, 1887	Attended provisional meeting on March 10, 1844. Elected standing chairman April 10, 1880. Anointed and ordained as King, Priest, and Ruler over Israel on Earth on February 4, 1885.
Ezra Thayre	October 14, 1791	September 6, 1862	Between Mar. 14 and Apr. 11, 1844	After April 22, 1845	
Lorenzo D. Wasson	1819	July 28, 1857	March 11, 1844	February 4, 1845	Attended provisional meeting of March 10, 1844
Newel K. Whitney	February 5, 1795	September 24, 1850	March 11, 1844	September 24, 1850	Attended provisional meeting of March 10, 1844
Lyman Wight	May 9, 1796	March 31, 1858	May 3, 1844	February 4, 1845	Was voted on April 18, 1844
Wilford Woodruff	March 1, 1807	September 2, 1898	March 13, 1844	September 2, 1898	
Lucien Woodworth	April 3, 1799	1868	March 11, 1844	After 1848	
David D. Yearsley	March 3, 1808	October 11, 1849	Between Mar. 14 and Apr. 11, 1844	October 11, 1849	
Brigham Young	June 1, 1801	August 29, 1877	March 11, 1844	August 29, 1877	Attended provisional meeting on March 10, 1844. Appointed standing chairman February 4, 1845. Anointed and ordained King, Priest, and Ruler over Israel on Earth, probably in 1848–1849 period.

== The Church of Jesus Christ of Latter-day Saints ==
This table includes individuals who joined the Council of Fifty following after June 27, 1844, and under the leadership of Brigham Young, president of the LDS Church. Generally they are only regarded as early leaders of the church by the LDS Church.

Members of the Council of Fifty of the Church of Jesus Christ of Latter-day Saints
Name	Birth	Death	Admitted	Released/Dropped	Notes
Ezra T. Benson	February 22, 1811	September 3, 1869	December 25, 1846	September 3, 1869	Benson was a member of the Quorum of the Twelve Apostles from July 16, 1846, to September 3, 1869.
William Budge	May 1, 1828	March 18, 1919	April 10, 1880	March 18, 1919	Considered April 10, 1880. Was voted on June 24, 1882. A member of the Idaho Legislature.
Thomas Bullock	December 23, 1816	February 10, 1885	December 25, 1846	June 24, 1882	Released due to old age. Reporter for the Council meetings from 1848. Was a clerk in the Church Historian's Office of the Church of Jesus Christ of Latter-day Saints.
Robert T. Burton	October 25, 1821	November 11, 1907	January 25, 1867	November 11, 1907	A member of the presiding bishopric and a principal officers in the Nauvoo Legion during its Utah reconstitution (including the Utah War) and led the territorial militia against the Morrisites during the 1862 Morrisite War.
John Thomas Caine	January 8, 1829	September 20, 1911	April 8, 1881	September 20, 1911	A delegate to the United States House of Representatives from the Territory of Utah.
Abraham H. Cannon	March 12, 1859	July 19, 1896	October 9, 1884	July 19, 1896	A member of the Quorum of the Twelve Apostles from October 7, 1889, to July 19, 1896.
Angus M. Cannon	May 17, 1834	June 7, 1915	April 10, 1880	June 7, 1915	Cannon was the appellant in the case of Cannon v. United States, which was decided by the United States Supreme Court after Cannon was convicted under the Edmunds Act of unlawful cohabitation and sentenced to six months' imprisonment and a $900 fine.
George Q. Cannon	January 11, 1827	April 12, 1901	January 23, 1867	April 12, 1901	Elected recorder January 23, 1867. George Q. Cannon was early member of the Quorum of the Twelve Apostles and a member of First Presidency under four Presidents of the church.
John Q. Cannon	April 19, 1857	January 14, 1931	October 9, 1884	January 14, 1931	Editor-in-chief of the Deseret News in Salt Lake City, Utah and Second Counselor in the Presiding Bishopric.
Albert Carrington	January 8, 1813	September 19, 1889	April 18 or 22, 1845	September 19, 1889	Reporter for Council meetings in 1848.
Hiram B. Clawson	November 7, 1826	March 29, 1912	June 27, 1882	March 29, 1912	
Jeter Clinton	February 17, 1813	May 10, 1892	January 25, 1867	May 10, 1892	
William W. Cluff	March 8, 1832	August 21, 1915	April 10, 1880	August 21, 1915	
John Van Cott	September 7, 1814	February 18, 1883	October 12, 1880	February 18, 1883	
Lewis Dana	January 1, 1805	June 8, 1885	March 1, 1845	After 1848	
Cyrus Daniels	September 12, 1803	1846	March 11, 1845	1846	
Jonathan Dunham	January 14, 1800	July 28, 1845	March 1, 1845	July 28, 1845	
Horace S. Eldredge	February 6, 1816	September 6, 1888	December 9, 1848	September 6, 1888	
John W. Farnham	December 5, 1794	August 16, 1846	April 18 or 22, 1845	August 16, 1846	
Lorin Farr	July 25, 1820	January 12, 1909	October 12, 1880	January 12, 1909	
Lucian R. Foster	November 12, 1806	March 19, 1876	March 1, 1845	November 12, 1846	
David Fullmer	July 7, 1803	October 21, 1879	March 1, 1845	October 21, 1879	
John S. Fullmer	July 21, 1807	October 8, 1883	April 18 or 22, 1845	June 24, 1882	Released due to old age
George F. Gibbs	November 23, 1846	March 10, 1924	June 24, 1882	March 10, 1924	Appointed reporter, but not member, on April 5, 1882.
George D. Grant	September 10, 1812	September 20, 1876	September 9, 1845	September 20, 1876	
Heber J. Grant	November 22, 1856	May 14, 1945	Jun. 27 or Oct. 10, 1882	May 14, 1945	Was voted on June 26, 1882
Leonard W. Hardy	December 31, 1805	July 31, 1884	June 27, 1882	July 31, 1884	
Abram C. Hatch	January 3, 1830	December 3, 1911	June 29, 1883	December 3, 1911	
Joseph L. Heywood	August 1, 1815	October 16, 1910	December 6, 1848	June 24, 1882	Released due to old age
William H. Hooper	December 25, 1813	December 30, 1882	October 10, 1867	December 30, 1882	
Edward Hunter	June 22, 1793	October 16, 1883	January 25, 1867	October 16, 1883	Was voted on January 23, 1867
William Jennings	September 13, 1823	January 15, 1886	April 10, 1880	January 15, 1886	
Heber P. Kimball	June 1, 1835	February 8, 1885	April 5, 1867	February 8, 1885	Was voted on January 23, 1867
Charles S. Kimball	January 2, 1843	December 2, 1925	January 25, 1867	December 2, 1925	Was voted on January 23, 1867
David P. Kimball	August 23, 1839	November 21, 1883	January 25, 1867	November 21, 1883	Was voted on January 23, 1867
Christopher Layton	March 8, 1821	August 7, 1898	June 29, 1883	August 7, 1898	
John D. Lee	September 12, 1812	March 23, 1877	March 1, 1845	March 23, 1877	Acted as council clerk 1846 meetings.
Feramorz Little	June 14, 1820	August 14, 1887	April 1880	August 14, 1887	
Francis M. Lyman	January 12, 1840	November 18, 1916	April 10, 1880	November 18, 1916	
Isaac Morley	March 11, 1786	June 24, 1865	March 1, 1845	June 24, 1865	Was voted on March 1, 1845.
John R. Murdock	September 13, 1826	November 12, 1913	April 10, 1880	November 12, 1913	Considered April 10, 1880
L. John Nuttall	July 6, 1834	February 23, 1905	April 10, 1880	February 23, 1905	Elected clerk April 10, 1880
John Pack	May 20, 1809	April 4, 1885	March 1, 1845	After December 26, 1846	Released due to old age
John E. Page	February 25, 1799	October 14, 1867	March 1, 1845	November 12, 1846	
Charles W. Penrose	February 4, 1832	May 16, 1925	June 26, 1882	May 16, 1925	
Canute Peterson	May 13, 1824	October 14, 1902	October 10, 1882	October 14, 1902	Was voted on June 27, 1882.
Parley P. Pratt, Jr.	March 25, 1837	August 25, 1897	January 25, 1867	August 25, 1897	
William B. Preston	November 24, 1830	August 2, 1908	April 10, 1880	August 2, 1908	
George Reynolds	January 1, 1842	August 9, 1909	April 8, 1881	August 9, 1909	
Joseph C. Rich	January 16, 1841	October 17, 1908	January 25, 1867	October 17, 1908	
Franklin D. Richards	April 2, 1821	December 9, 1899	March 17, 1849	December 9, 1899	
Franklin S. Richards	June 20, 1849	September 4, 1934	April 10, 1880	September 4, 1934	
Heber J. Richards	October 11, 1840	May 12, 1919	January 23, 1867	May 12, 1919	
Phinehas H. Richards	November 15, 1788	November 25, 1874	December 6, 1848	November 25, 1874	
Albert P. Rockwood	June 5, 1805	November 25, 1879	March 1, 1845	November 25, 1879	
Shadrach Roundy	January 1, 1789	July 4, 1872	March 1, 1845	July 4, 1872	
John Sharp	November 9, 1820	December 23, 1891	January 25, 1867	December 23, 1891	
Charles Shumway	August 1, 1806	May 21, 1898	April 18 or 22, 1845	June 24, 1882	Released due to old age
Lewis W. Shurtliff	July 24, 1835	May 2, 1922	April 10, 1883	May 2, 1922	
John Henry Smith	September 18, 1848	October 13, 1911	April 10, 1880	October 13, 1911	Grandson of (Uncle) John Smith. Made an Apostle in 1880.
Joseph F. Smith	November 13, 1838	November 19, 1918	Jan. 25 or Apr. 5, 1867	November 19, 1918	Was voted on January 23, 1867
Silas S. Smith	October 26, 1830	October 11, 1910	April 10, 1880	October 11, 1910	
William R. Smith	August 11, 1826	January 15, 1894	April 10, 1880	January 15, 1894	
Abraham O. Smoot	February 17, 1815	March 22, 1895	January 25, 1867	March 22, 1895	
Lorenzo Snow	April 3, 1814	October 10, 1901	March 10, 1849	October 10, 1901	
Willard Snow	May 6, 1811	August 21, 1853	December 6, 1848	August 21, 1853	
Daniel Spencer	July 20, 1794	December 8, 1868	March 18, 1845	December 8, 1868	Was voted on March 1, 1845
Hosea Stout	September 18, 1810	March 2, 1889	January 25, 1867	March 2, 1889	
George J. Taylor	January 31, 1834	December 15, 1914	January 25, 1867	December 15, 1914	
John W. Taylor	May 15, 1858	October 10, 1916	1884	October 10, 1916	
William W. Taylor	September 11, 1853	August 1, 1884	April 10, 1880	August 1, 1884	Elected assistant clerk on April 10, 1880.
George Teasdale	December 8, 1831	June 9, 1907	Jun. 27 or Oct. 10, 1882	June 9, 1907	Was voted on June 26, 1882
Moses Thatcher	February 2, 1842	August 21, 1909	April 10, 1880	August 21, 1909	
Theodore Turley	April 10, 1801	August 18, 1871	March 1, 1845	June 12, 1870	
Daniel H. Wells	October 27, 1814	March 24, 1891	December 6, 1848	March 24, 1891	
Junius F. Wells	June 1, 1854	April 15, 1930	April 10, 1880	April 15, 1930	
John R. Winder	December 11, 1821	March 27, 1910	April 8, 1881	March 27, 1910	
Brigham Young, Jr.	December 18, 1836	April 11, 1903	January 23, 1867	April 11, 1903	
John M. Young	May 27, 1791	April 27, 1870	February 9, 1849	April 27, 1870	Brother of Brigham Young
John W. Young	October 1, 1844	February 12, 1924	October 5, 1867	February 12, 1924	
Joseph Young	April 7, 1797	July 16, 1881	March 1, 1845	July 16, 1881	
Joseph A. Young	October 14, 1834	August 5, 1875	January 23, 1867	August 5, 1875	
Phineas H. Young	February 16, 1799	October 10, 1879	April 15, 1845	October 10, 1879	"Fellowship" in the council was challenged on August 22, 1851, but reconciled with the council on that date
Seymour B. Young	October 3, 1837	December 15, 1924	October 9, 1884	December 15, 1924	
