= 1st Utah Territorial Legislature =

The 1st Utah Territorial Legislature was convened on September 22, 1851, and ended on March 6, 1852.

== Sessions ==
- General Session: September 22, 1851 - February 18, 1852
- Special Session: February 19, 1852 - March 6, 1852

== Members ==
Name	County	Office	Notes
Territorial Council:
Ezra T. Benson	Salt Lake		Resigned September 24, 1851
Charles R. Dana	Weber		
Lorin Farr	Weber		
John S. Fullmer	Davis		
Jedediah M. Grant	Salt Lake		Resigned September 23, 1851
Edward Hunter	Salt Lake		Elected November 15, 1851
Aaron Johnson	Utah		
Heber C. Kimball	Salt Lake		
Isaac Morley	San Pete		
Orson Pratt	Salt Lake		Elected November 15, 1851
Willard Richards	Salt Lake	President	
George A. Smith	Iron		
Orson Spencer	Salt Lake		
Daniel H. Wells	Salt Lake		
Alexander Williams	Utah		
Territorial House of Representatives:
George W. Brimhall	Iron		Elected November 15, 1851
James Brown	Weber		
John Brown	Salt Lake		Elected November 15, 1851
James G. Browning	Weber		
Gideon Brownell	Davis		
David B. Dille	Weber		
David Evans	Utah		
Nathaniel H. Felt	Salt Lake		
David Fullmer	Salt Lake		
Elisha H. Groves	Iron		
Levi W. Hancock	Utah		
Benjamin F. Johnson	Salt Lake		
Andrew L. Lamoreaux	Davis		
William Miller	Utah		
William W. Phelps	Salt Lake	Speaker	
Phinehas Richards	Salt Lake		
Albert P. Rockwood	Salt Lake		
John Rowberry	Tooele		
Henry G. Sherwood	Salt Lake		
Charles Shumway	San Pete		
Willard Snow	Salt Lake		Resigned September 24, 1851
Daniel Spencer	Salt Lake		
John Stoker	Davis		
Hosea Stout	Salt Lake		
Wilford Woodruff	Salt Lake		
Edwin D. Woolley	Salt Lake		
Joseph Young	Salt Lake		
