= Shumway =

Shumway may refer to:

== Places ==
- Shumway, Arizona, a populated place in Navajo County, Arizona
- Shumway, Illinois, a village Effingham County, Illinois

== People ==
- Bettie Shumway (1924–2007), American politician
- Charles Shumway (1806–1898), American politician
- Deborah Shumway (1955–2022), American cyclist
- DeVan L. Shumway (1930–2008), American publisher and Nixon aide
- Eric B. Shumway (born 1939), American former college president
- F. Ritter Shumway (1906–1992), American figure skater
- Henry Colton Shumway (1807–1884), American soldier and artist
- James Shumway (1939–2003), American politician
- John Shumway, American journalist
- Lee Shumway (1884–1959), American actor
- Matt Shumway (born 1978), American visual effects artist
- Margot Shumway (born 1979), American rower
- Naomi M. Shumway (1922–2004), American church executive and writer
- Nehemiah Shumway (1761–1843), American composer
- Norman Shumway (1923–2006), pioneering American heart surgeon
- Norman D. Shumway (1934–2022), U.S. Representative from California
- Perley J. Shumway (1810–1863), American politician
- R. H. Shumway (1842–1925), American businessman and botanist
- Robert H. Shumway (1936–2025), American statistician
- Randy Shumway (born 1971), American CEO
- Walter Shumway (1884–1965), American actor

== Other uses ==
- Shumway (software), an open source Adobe Flash player built upon JavaScript and HTML5
- Gordon Shumway, the fictional title character of the TV series ALF
- Julia Shumway, a fictional character in the TV series Under the Dome
- Shumway Block, historic building in Webster, Massachusetts
- C.W. Shumway & Sons, former foundry in Batavia, Illinois
