= Charles Shumway =

American politician

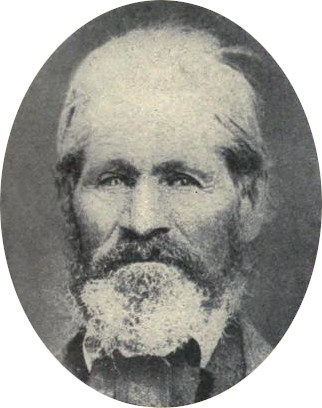
- Born: August 2, 1806; Oxford, Massachusetts
- Died: May 21, 1898 (aged 91); Shumway, Arizona
- Known for: Founder of Shumway, Arizona

Charles Shumway (1806–1898) was an early member of the Church of Jesus Christ of Latter-day Saints who served as a member of the Council of Fifty and was part of the Utah Legislature for one term in 1851.

== Early life ==
Shumway was born in Oxford, Massachusetts to Parley Shumway and his wife the former Polly Johnson. By his mid-teens he had moved to Brimfield, Massachusetts. In 1832 he married Julie Ann Hooker in Sturbridge, Massachusetts. He moved to Illinois in 1837 where in 1841 he was baptized a member of The Church of Jesus Christ of Latter-day Saints by Elisha H. Groves.

== Nauvoo ==
That same year he moved to Nauvoo, Illinois. The following year he served a mission to the Cherokee Nation along with Phineas Young. He later served for a time as a policeman in Nauvoo. Also during his residence in Nauvoo he went on a mission to Massachusetts with Daniel Spencer. In 1845 he was sent on assignment by the Council of Fifty to meet with a council of Native American leaders, but the meeting did not happen as planned. In 1846 he was involved in the organization of Winter Quarters, Nebraska.

In 1846 Shumway was one of the members of the first group of Latter-day Saints to enter the Salt Lake Valley, under the leadership of Brigham Young. He was the captain of the Sixth Ten company that headed west, and lead the first wagons across the Mississippi River. After crossing the river, Shumway's team lead his company several miles away to Sugar Creek, Iowa, to wait for President Brigham Young and other leaders to arrive several days later.

== Utah ==
In 1849 he led the group that founded Manti, Utah where he served as the first bishop. He also built the first sawmill in that county. In 1851 he was in the Utah legislature.

In 1854 he constructed a sawmill in Payson, Utah but later that year relocated to Murray, Utah. In 1857 he served a mission for the Church to Canada. He moved further north in Utah in 1859 settling in Wellsville, Utah. A short time later he moved to Mendon, Utah also in Cache County, Utah. When a branch of ZCMI was organized in that community in 1869 he was on the board of directors.

In 1877 he moved to Kane County, Utah in southern Utah. He then moved to Taylor, Arizona in 1879 and a short while later to Shumway, Arizona. In Shumway he built a gristmill. He served as a member of the high council of the Snowflake Stake and as a patriarch of that stake.

Kenneth Godfrey a descendant, would later write a biography of Shumway.

== Family ==
Charles Shumway married Julia Ann Hooker on 26 March 1832 in Sturbridge, Worcester, Massachusetts, USA. Together they had four children:

- Andrew Purley Shumway (1833-1909)
- Mary Eliza Shumway (1836-1932)
- Charles Samuel Shumway (1840-1841)
- Harriet Shumway (1844-1846)

== Sources ==
- Joseph Smith Papers Project bio of Shumway
