= Alexander Badlam =

American Mormon leader (1809–1894)

First Quorum of the Seventy
- February 28, 1835 – c.1855
- Called by: Joseph Smith

Member of the Council of Fifty
- 1851 – c.1868
- Called by: Brigham Young

Member of the Council of Fifty
- March 11, 1844 – February 4, 1845
- Called by: Joseph Smith

Personal details
- Born: November 28, 1809; Dorchester, Massachusetts, United States
- Died: December 1, 1894 (aged 85); San Francisco, California, United States
- Resting place: Saint Helena Public Cemetery; 38.4926°N 122.4766°W
- Spouse(s): Mary Ann Brannan
- Parents: Ezra Badlam; Mary Lovis

Alexander Badlam Sr. (November 28, 1809 – December 1, 1894) was an early leader in the Latter Day Saint movement and a Mormon pioneer.

Badlam was born in Dorchester, Massachusetts. He was a coachmaker by trade. In 1833, Badlam married Mary Ann Brannan in York County, Maine. The couple became members of Joseph Smith's Church of Christ and moved to the Kirtland, Ohio, region.

In 1834, Badlam was a member of the Zion's Camp expedition that traveled from Lake County, Ohio, to Jackson County, Missouri. On February 28, 1835, Badlam became one of the inaugural members of the First Quorum of the Seventy. In 1835, he settled in Missouri and became a member of the church's Missouri high council.

In 1839, after the "extermination order" was issued, Badlam fled Missouri with the other Latter Day Saints was issued and settled in Nauvoo, Illinois. Badlam was admitted as a member of the Council of Fifty on March 11, 1844, but was dropped from the council on February 4, 1845.

In 1847 and 1848, Badlam presided over the branch of the church in Boston, Massachusetts. In 1849, he traveled from Boston by ship to Sacramento, California, to participate in the California Gold Rush. In 1850, he returned to Boston and he and his family traveled by ship to Utah Territory via California as Mormon pioneers. After arriving in Utah, Badlam was readmitted to the Council of Fifty.

By 1855, Badlam had abandoned the Church of Jesus Christ of Latter-day Saints, and by 1860 he had moved back to Sacramento. By 1880, he was living in San Francisco, where he died.

Badlam was the brother-in-law to Samuel Brannan, California's first millionaire.
