= Glorification =

Christian term

Glorification may have several meanings in Christianity. The Nicene Creed states that God the Father, the Son and the Holy Spirit are glorified. From the Catholic canonization to the similar sainthood of the Eastern Orthodox Church to salvation in Christianity in Protestant beliefs, the glorification of the human condition can be a long and arduous process.

== Catholicism ==
The Catholic Church associates the resurrection of Jesus with his glorification, and teaches that "at the end of time, the Kingdom of God will come in its fullness. After the universal judgment, the righteous will reign for ever with Christ, glorified in body and soul. The universe itself will be renewed. [...] The visible universe, then, is itself destined to be transformed, 'so that the world itself, restored to its original state, facing no further obstacles, should be at the service of the just', sharing their glorification in the risen Jesus Christ."

The act of canonization, which the Catholic Church does not normally call glorification (as theologically, God is the one who glorifies), is something reserved in the Latin Church and Eastern Catholic Churches to the Apostolic See. This occurs at the conclusion of a long process requiring extensive proof a candidate for canonisation lived and died in an exemplary and holy way. The Church’s official declaration of a person or persons' sanctity implies them as presently in Heaven enjoying the Beatific Vision, and thus may be publicly invoked. Canonisation is therefore the act wherein the Church recognises and declares someone is a saint, and not the common misnomer that it is the "making" of a saint.

Canonization also decrees the name of the saint be inscribed in the Roman Martyrology, and that veneration may be given to the saint throughout the universal Church. Veneration within the liturgy is regulated by the norms of each individual liturgical rite: on weekdays of the year with no assigned particular solemnity, feast, or obligatory memorial, the Roman Rite allows celebration of the Mass of any Saint listed in the Martyrology for that day.

Beatification is a similar decree permitting public veneration of a person or group recognised as holy, only within a limited geographical area or in certain communities, such as a religious institute.

== Eastern Orthodox Church ==
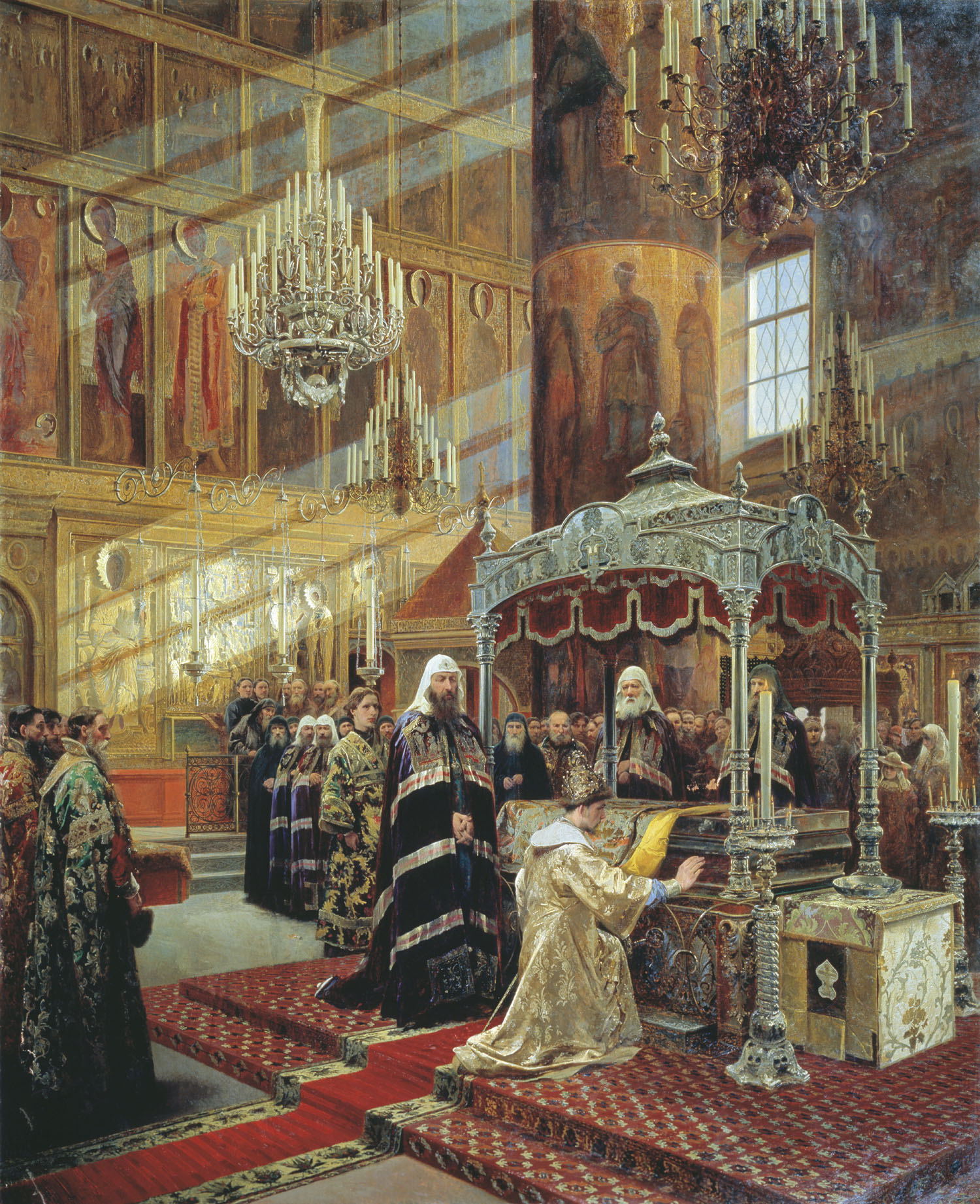
Tsar Alexis of Russia (reigned 1645–1676) praying before the relics of Metropolitan Philip of Moscow (in office 1566–1568) in the Presence of Patriarch Nikon

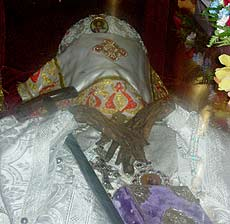
The incorrupt Relics of St. John (Maximovitch) at the time of his glorification in San Francisco in 1994

The Eastern Orthodox Church, as, for instance, the Orthodox Church in America, uses the term "glorification" to refer to the official recognition of a person as a saint of the Church. The Greek Orthodox church avoids using the term "canonization" because it is a Latin Church term.

The Russian Orthodox Church uses the terms канонизация ("canonization"), прославление ("glorification"), and the act of "numbering among the saints".

== Oriental Orthodox Church ==
The Oriental Orthodox Churches also hold a doctrinal tradition similar to the Eastern Orthodox Churches whereby martyrs are not in need of any formal glorification. With time, the greatness of their sanctity which is venerated by the faithful is recognized by the Church. In the words of Armenian Patriarch H. H. Karekin II,

The Armenian Church doesn't sanctify. It recognizes the sanctity of saints or of those people that is already common among people or has been shown with evidence.

This is in conformity with the tradition of other Churches in the Oriental Orthodox family such as Coptic Orthodox Church, Syriac Orthodox Church, Ethiopian Orthodox Church and Indian Orthodox Church. The instances of glorification of the 21 Coptic martyrs in 2015 or the victims of Armenian genocide of 1915 simply serve as official recognition given by the hierarchs to the steadfast faith of those who laid down their lives in defense of their Christian identity.

== Reformed Churches ==
There are two events that occur during glorification, these are "the receiving of perfection by the elect before entering into the kingdom of heaven", and "the receiving of the resurrection bodies by the elect".

Glorification is the third stage of Christian development, the first being justification, then sanctification, and finally glorification. (Romans 8:28-30) Glorification is the completion, the consummation, the perfection, and the full realization of salvation.

=== Receiving of perfection ===
Glorification is the means by which the elect are delivered from their sins before entering into the kingdom of Heaven. According to Reformed Christians, glorification is a continuous, flowing process, whereby believers in Jesus the Christ, who have either died or who are raptured alive (called up into heaven), receive glorified, perfect bodies and souls, sinless and Christlike. It is not a painful process.

Jerry L. Walls and James B. Gould have likened that process to the core or sanctification view of purgatory. "Grace is much more than forgiveness, it is also transformation and sanctification, and finally, glorification. We need more than forgiveness and justification to purge our sinful dispositions and make us fully ready for heaven. Purgatory is nothing more than the continuation of the sanctifying grace we need, for as long as necessary to complete the job".

Glorification is the Reformed alternative to purgatory. According to the theologies of most major Protestant groups, purgatory is a doctrine of the Catholic Church, a holding place for those whose lives were dominated by venial sins but not guilty of mortal sins.

=== Receiving of the resurrection bodies ===
After the final judgement, all the righteous dead shall arise and their bodies will be perfected and will become a glorified body. Only then can they enter heaven. To paraphrase C. S. Lewis's Weight of Glory: "If we were to see them in their glorified forms we would be tempted to bow down and worship them."
