= Shadrach Roundy =

Latter Day Saint leader

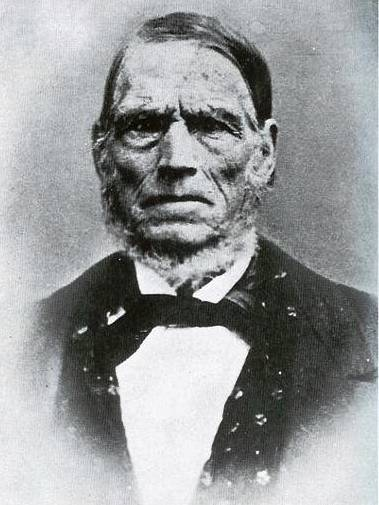

Member of the Council of Fifty
- March 1, 1845 – July 4, 1872
- Called by: Brigham Young

Personal details
- Born: January 1, 1789; Rockingham, Vermont, United States
- Died: July 4, 1872 (aged 83); Salt Lake City, Utah Territory, United States
- Resting place: Salt Lake City Cemetery; 40.777°N 111.858°W
- Known For: Early Mormon Pioneer
- Spouse(s): Betsy Quimby
- Children: 10
- Parents: Uriah Roundy; Lucretia Needham

Shadrach Roundy (January 1, 1789 – July 4, 1872) was an early Latter Day Saint leader born in Rockingham, Vermont. Roundy was the second oldest (59) member of Brigham Young's Company, which arrived in the Salt Lake Valley in 1847, and was one of the advance party which arrived in the valley ahead of the main party in order to start planting crops. He was one of the three men who, on July 23, 1847, were the first Mormon pioneers recorded to plow soil in what became Utah. He is also mentioned in Doctrine and Covenants 124:141 and was a bodyguard of Joseph Smith.

He was a bishop in Winter Quarters, Nebraska, a member of the first High Council organized in the Salt Lake Valley, again a bishop in Salt Lake City, a senator in the first legislature of the provisional State of Deseret.

== Role during Mormon expulsion from Missouri ==
Roundy played a very important part in the removal of the Latter Day Saints from Missouri. So much of the Mormons' property had been either destroyed or taken over by mobocrats that a number of destitute refugees found it impossible to move themselves and families to safety. The timing of the expulsion during the winter of 1838-39 also greatly aggravated conditions, but the more fortunate promised to assist those in need. Quoting from a meeting held at Far West on January 29, 1839:

On motion of President Brigham Young, it was resolved that we this day enter into a covenant to stand by and assist each other to the utmost of our abilities in removing from this State, and that we will never desert the poor who are worthy, till they shall be out of the reach of the exterminating order of General Clark, acting for and in the name of the State. Thereupon the proposed covenant was drawn up and signed by three hundred and eighty of the stalwarts of the Mormon group.

Roundy was the ninth to sign the covenant, which bound the signers to give freely of all their "available property, to be disposed of by a committee who shall be appointed for the purpose of providing means for the removing from this State of the poor and destitute who shall be considered worthy, till there shall not be one left who desires to remove from the State." Accordingly, a committee composed of Roundy and six others directed the removal of the exiles, and provided means of conveyance, food, clothing, and temporary shelters for the destitute.

== Nauvoo Years (1839–46) ==
After their removal from Missouri, the majority of Latter Day Saints fled to Western Illinois, eventually concentrating at Commerce (renamed Nauvoo), Hancock County, Illinois. Although the Latter Day Saints were only in Hancock County for seven years, it provided a home where they experienced many changes and developments. During this time period Roundy was active in both civil and ecclesiastical affairs. Roundy was a member of the Nauvoo Police force beginning in 1843. He was also one of twelve men on the Board of Control for the Nauvoo Agricultural and Mechanical (or Manufacturing) Association. Roundy protected Joseph Smith on at least two occasions. Once, while a group of men led by William Law tried to enter the Smith home Roundy held them back with his cane. On another occasion he accompanied Smith to Monmouth, Illinois, for a trial. Roundy helped prepare the Red Brick Store for some of the first endowments performed in Nauvoo. Shortly before the exodus from Nauvoo, Roundy was assigned to explore California (apparently the plan was never carried out) as an option for settlement in the West opposed to the Great Basin.

== Latter life in Utah ==
Roundy was bishop of the 16th Ward in Salt Lake City from 1849 until 1856. Roundy died in Salt Lake City. His name is listed as one of the original pioneers on Cyrus Dallin's Brigham Young Monument in Temple Square.

Roundy is the 3rd great-grandfather of The Real Housewives of Salt Lake City cast member Whitney Rose.
