= Joseph L. Heywood =

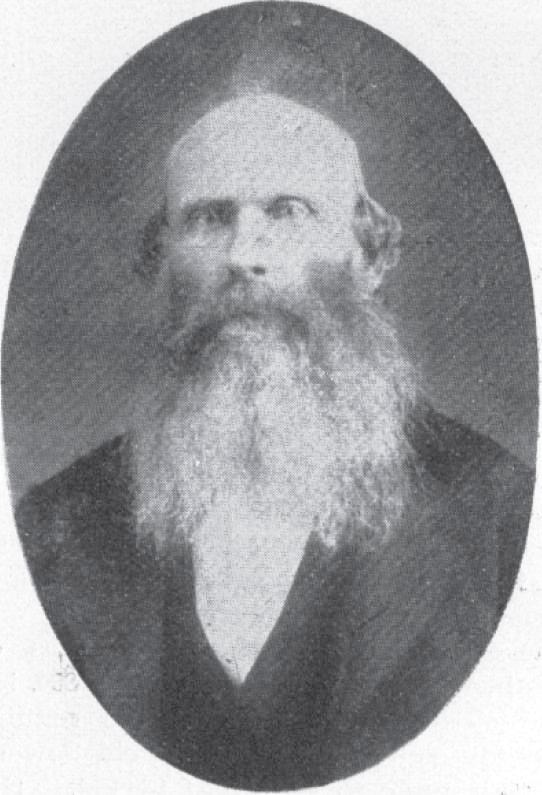

Personal details
- Born: August 1, 1815; Grafton, Massachusetts, United States
- Died: October 16, 1910; Panguitch, Utah, United States

Joseph L. Heywood (August 1, 1815 – October 16, 1910) was a local leader of the Church of Jesus Christ of Latter-day Saints in the 19th century, and the founder of Nephi, Utah.

Heywood was born in Grafton, Worcester County, Massachusetts. In 1839 he moved to Quincy, Illinois where he was a merchant. It was here that he first met the Mormons, and later joined The LDS Church on a visit to Nauvoo. Heywood was baptized by Orson Hyde. While still in Nauvoo Heywood was called as a bishop.

In 1846 when the Latter-day Saints left Nauvoo, Heywood was appointed a trustee to sell property of the LDS Church along with Almon Babbitt and John S. Fullmer.

Later in Utah Heywood served as the first bishop of the 17th Ward in Salt Lake City. Heywood was the first US Marshall for the territory of Utah.

In addition to supervising the settlement of Nephi, Utah he accompanied Orson Hyde in setting up the first LDS settlement in the Carson Valley of Nevada at Mormon station in Genoa. From 1861 Heywood lived primarily in Panguitch. He served as an LDS patriarch in that area. Heywood's house in Salt Lake City, which was on the block where the Conference Center is today, was still identified with him after his move to southern Utah, and it was John Morgan's first residence on coming to Utah.

== Notes ==
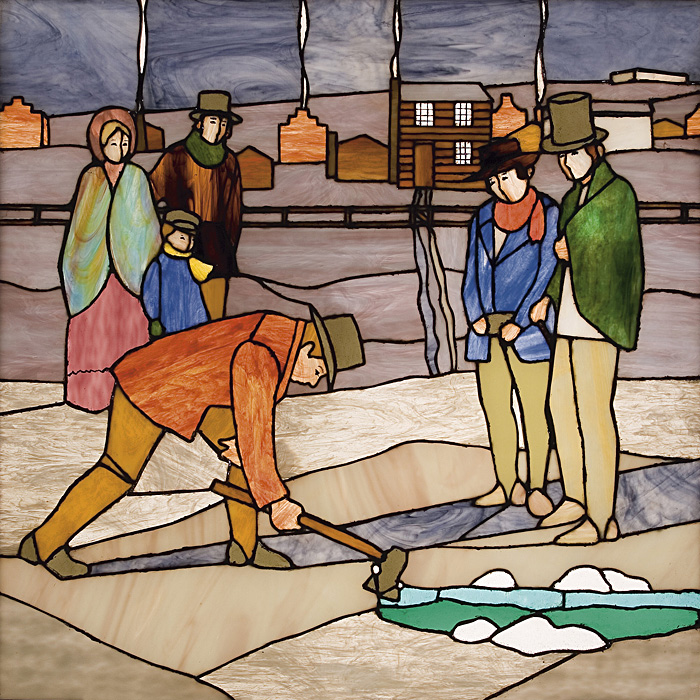
