= Almon W. Babbitt =

American politician

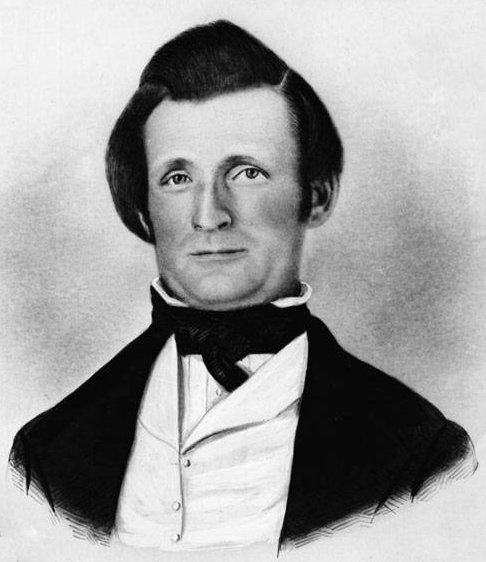
Almon W. Babbitt

Almon Whiting Babbitt (9 October 1812 – c. 7 September 1856) was an early leader in the Latter Day Saint movement, a Mormon pioneer, and the first secretary and treasurer of the Territory of Utah. He was killed in a raid by Cheyenne Native Americans in Nebraska Territory while travelling on government business between Utah and Washington, D.C.

== Early life and church service ==
Babbitt was born in Cheshire, Massachusetts to Ira and Nancy Babbitt. He graduated from Ohio State University at Cincinnati and became licensed to practice law in six states. He married Julia Ann Johnson on 23 November 1833 and is thought to have joined the Latter Day Saint church sometime in 1833. In 1834, he was a member of Zion's Camp, and on 28 February 1835 he was ordained as one of the first seventies in the church by Joseph Smith, Jr. Babbitt later became a high priest in the church.

In 1837 and 1838, Babbitt was a missionary for the church in Upper Canada. He attempted to move to Missouri in 1838 but was among the Latter Day Saints who were driven out by unfriendly residents, eventually settling in Nauvoo, Illinois. At a conference of the church in May 1839, Babbitt, Robert B. Thompson, and Erastus Snow were appointed to be a traveling committee that was charged with "gather[ing] up and obtain[ing] all the libelous reports and publications which had been circulated against the Church."

In 1841, Babbitt was appointed as the president of the church's Kirtland Stake, where he was charged with shepherding the Latter Day Saints who did not have the financial resources to move to Nauvoo. In 1843, Babbitt's tenure ended in Kirtland and he began actively practicing law in Nauvoo; he was frequently employed to defend Latter Day Saints in legal disputes. While in Nauvoo, Babbitt was also selected by Joseph Smith, Jr. to become a member of two select groups: the Anointed Quorum and Council of Fifty.

In 1844, Babbitt was elected to the Illinois House of Representatives. In February 1846, Babbitt, Joseph L. Heywood and John S. Fullmer were together given charge over the affairs of the church in Nauvoo after the departure of the church apostles. After the Battle of Nauvoo in September 1846, Babbitt and the two other men signed the treaty that "surrendered" the city of Nauvoo's charter.

== Utah political leader ==
In 1848, Babbitt emigrated to Utah Territory to join the gathering of the Church of Jesus Christ of Latter-day Saints (LDS Church), led by Brigham Young. In Utah, Babbitt, a Democrat, became involved in politics. In 1849, he was selected by the provisional General Assembly of the State of Deseret to travel to Washington, D.C., and petition for statehood on behalf of the Assembly. Instead, the federal government created the Territory of Utah and in 1853 Babbitt was appointed secretary and treasurer of the territory. In this position, Babbitt had frequent clashes with Brigham Young, the territorial governor and the president of the LDS Church. These clashes have been attributed in part to Babbitt's tendency to view himself as a representative of the United States federal government rather than an enabler of Young's pro-LDS Church policies.

Babbitt led a company of Mormon pioneers to Utah in 1851.

== Conflict with Latter Day Saint leaders ==
In addition to his clashes with Brigham Young, Babbitt was involved in a number of conflicts with Latter Day Saint leaders from his early days in the church. On 27 December 1833, Babbitt and his wife were summoned before a disciplinary council on an unspecified complaint; however, when the accusers failed to appear at the council, the charges were dismissed. On 19 August 1835, Babbitt brought before the church's high council on charges that included "not keeping the Word of Wisdom." Babbitt admitted the offence of breaking the Word of Wisdom and stated "that he had taken the liberty to break the Word of Wisdom, from the example of President Joseph Smith, Jun., and others, but acknowledged that it was wrong." The council "reproved" him and "instructed him to observe the Word of Wisdom, and commandments of the Lord in all things".

On 28 December 1835, Joseph Smith, Jr. submitted a complaint before the church's high council that Babbitt had been "misrepresenting" him to a number of Latter Day Saints. Babbitt claimed that Smith was angry with him because he had bested him in a debate. The council decided that Babbitt had spoken falsehoods against Smith; Babbitt confessed that he had "done wrong", but refused to confess that he had lied, and the matter was closed.

Later, Babbitt was disfellowshipped from the church four separate times, in 1839, 1841, 1843, and 1851, but each time was restored to fellowship shortly thereafter. In an 1841 revelation to Joseph Smith, Babbit is singled out for reproof for "aspir[ing] to establish his counsel ... [and] sett[ing] up a golden calf for the worship of my people." This was likely a result of Babbitt encouraging Latter Day Saints to settle and remain in the old church headquarters of Kirtland, where he was stake president, as opposed to encouraging Saints to move to Nauvoo, which had been designated by Smith as the new gathering place.

The day before Joseph Smith, Jr. was killed in Carthage Jail, Smith instructed his uncle John Smith to "tell Almon W. Babbitt I want him to come and assist me as an attorney at my expected trial". Upon delivering the message a few hours later, Babbitt told John Smith that "You are too late, I am already engaged on the other side."

== Murder victim ==
In April 1856, Babbitt left Salt Lake City for Washington, D.C., on his twenty-second trip on government business from Utah to the capital. On August 31, 1856, Babbitt set out from Florence, in Nebraska Territory, for Salt Lake City. When he arrived at Ft. Kearny (not to be confused with present-day Ft. Kearny), Babbitt learned that his freight train of personal property had been attacked and looted by Cheyenne Native Americans; two wagon drivers and a child were killed in the raid, and a Mrs. Wilson was taken hostage. Mrs. Wilson was killed almost immediately after being taken hostage because she was unable to ride horseback and keep up with her captors. Babbitt "stopped a week to gather up what could be found of the scattered property, purchased other teams, obtained drivers and start[ed] the train again".

Babbitt traveled ahead of the team in a carriage with "two attendants", Frank Roland and a Mr. Sutherland. About 120 miles west of Ft. Kearny—at Ash Hollow on the Oregon Trail—the three men were attacked on about August 10. On August 4, 1856, and 12 miles east of Ash Hollow near Pawnee Swamp and Rattlesnake Creek, a group of defecting Latter-day Saints—the Margettses and Cowdys—had also been attacked and murdered by Cheyenne. Zelphia Noble Sheffield Margetts was taken hostage and never redeemed. The Cheyenne claimed that they did not kill her, rather she escaped with a nearby government mapping party. Babbitt's obituary in the newspaper he had founded—the Council Bluffs Bugle—described how he was killed by a blow to the head by a tomahawk swung by a Cheyenne Indian. Because all three of Babbitt's party were killed, the information regarding his death came only from the Cheyenne Peace Chiefs who visited Indian Agent Thomas Twiss several times at Dripp's Trading Post after the series of Platte River Road raids in September 1856. Although rumors blamed Brigham Young, there is no shadow of any doubt that the Cheyenne killed Babbitt and his traveling companions. Upon hearing of his death, Brigham Young commented that Babbitt had "lived like a fool and died like a fool", causing some to suspect that Young or the Mormon Danites were somehow responsible for Babbitt's death. However, it is possible that Young was simply continuing to express his long-standing dislike of Babbitt: in December 1856, Young told the Utah Territorial Legislature, "If Almon Babbitt were here—thank God he is not—he would have found fault with everything."

== Family ==
Babbitt and his wife Julia were the parents of six children, four of which survived to adulthood. Babbitt also practiced plural marriage.
