= Joseph W. Coolidge =

Member of the Council of Fifty (1814–1871)

- Born: Joseph Wellington Coolidge; May 31, 1814; Bangor, Maine, U.S
- Died: January 13, 1871 (aged 56); Glenwood, Iowa, U.S
- Burial place: Glenwood Cemetery, Glenwood, Iowa
- Spouse: Elizabeth Buchannan
- Children: 2
- Parents: John Kittridge Coolidge (father); Rebecca Stone Wellington (mother)

Joseph Wellington Coolidge (May 31, 1814 – January 13, 1871) was a member of the Church of Jesus Christ of Latter-day Saints and the administrator of Joseph Smith's estate. He was also one of the members of the Council of Fifty in Nauvoo alongside Wilford Woodruff.

== Early life ==
Coolidge was born on May 31, 1814, in Bangor, Maine. He was the son of John Kittridge Coolidge and Rebecca Stone Wellington. He married Elizabeth Buchannan on December 17, 1834, and later moved to Kentucky in the mid-1830s. By the end of January 1838, Joseph and his wife joined the Latter-day Saints at Far West, Missouri. However, they were forced out due to the Mormon War that occurred at the end of that year.

In 1843, Coolidge moved to Nauvoo, where he then bought a $300 plot of land from Joseph Smith.

== Death ==
Coolidge died on January 13, 1871, at the age of 56 in Glenwood, Iowa. He was buried at Glenwood Cemetery.
