= James Emmett =

James Emmett (February 22, 1803 – December 28, 1852) was an early American Latter Day Saint and for a time claimed to be the rightful successor to Joseph Smith, the founder of the Latter Day Saint movement.

Emmett was born in Boone County, Kentucky. He was baptized into the Church of Christ in 1831 and in August 1832 he moved to Jackson County, Missouri to live with the gathering of Latter Day Saints there. He was a missionary for the church in Illinois, Indiana, Kentucky, Ohio, and Missouri.

In 1843, Emmett was living in Nauvoo, Illinois and was a bodyguard and close associate of Joseph Smith. In February 1844, Smith selected Emmett to explore the western United States and to select a location that the Latter Day Saints could settle in. Emmett was added to Smith's Council of Fifty in March 1844.

When Smith was killed later in 1844, Emmett claimed that he had been empowered by Smith to lead the Latter Day Saints away from Nauvoo to a new settlement. Brigham Young and the other church apostles attempted to convince Emmett that Young should lead the church, but Emmett gathered approximately 100 followers and the party made its way to present-day Vermillion, South Dakota. Young and the other apostles dropped Emmett from the ranks of the Council of Fifty in 1845.

By 1846, Emmett returned to Young and pledged to follow his leadership. In 1849, Emmett traveled to Utah Territory, but shortly thereafter he left the Latter Day Saint church and moved to Tuolumne County, California where he died.
