= Phineas Young =

American Mormon missionary

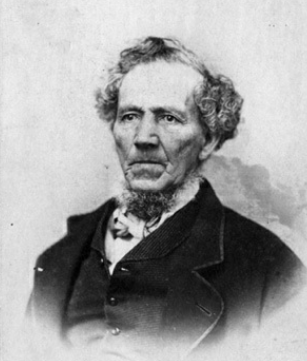

Personal details
- Born: Phineas Howe Young; February 16, 1799; Hopkinton, Massachusetts, United States
- Died: October 10, 1879 (aged 80); Salt Lake City, Utah Territory, United States
- Resting place: Salt Lake City Cemetery; 40.7772°N 111.8580°W
- Spouse(s): Clarissa Hamilton; Lucy P. Cowdery; Sarah A. Hollister; Phebe Clark; Maria E. James; Elizabeth Rea; Harriet A. Little; Constantia E. C. Langdon; Lavina Clark
- Parents: John Young; Abigail N. Howe

Phineas Howe Young (also found as Phinehas) (February 16, 1799 – October 10, 1879) was a prominent early convert in the Latter Day Saint movement and was later a Mormon pioneer and a missionary for the Church of Jesus Christ of Latter-day Saints (LDS Church). Phineas Young was an older brother of Brigham Young, who was the president of the LDS Church and the first governor of the Territory of Utah.

== Life ==
Young was born in Hopkinton, Massachusetts, the seventh child of John Young and Abigail Howe. Early in his life, Phineas was a Methodist preacher.

In 1830, Young was contacted by Samuel H. Smith, a missionary in the recently established Latter Day Saint movement. Smith sold Young a copy of the Book of Mormon and told him that it had been translated from ancient records by his brother Joseph Smith. Young undertook a careful study of the book and eventually passed it on to others in his family, including his brothers Brigham, Joseph and John.

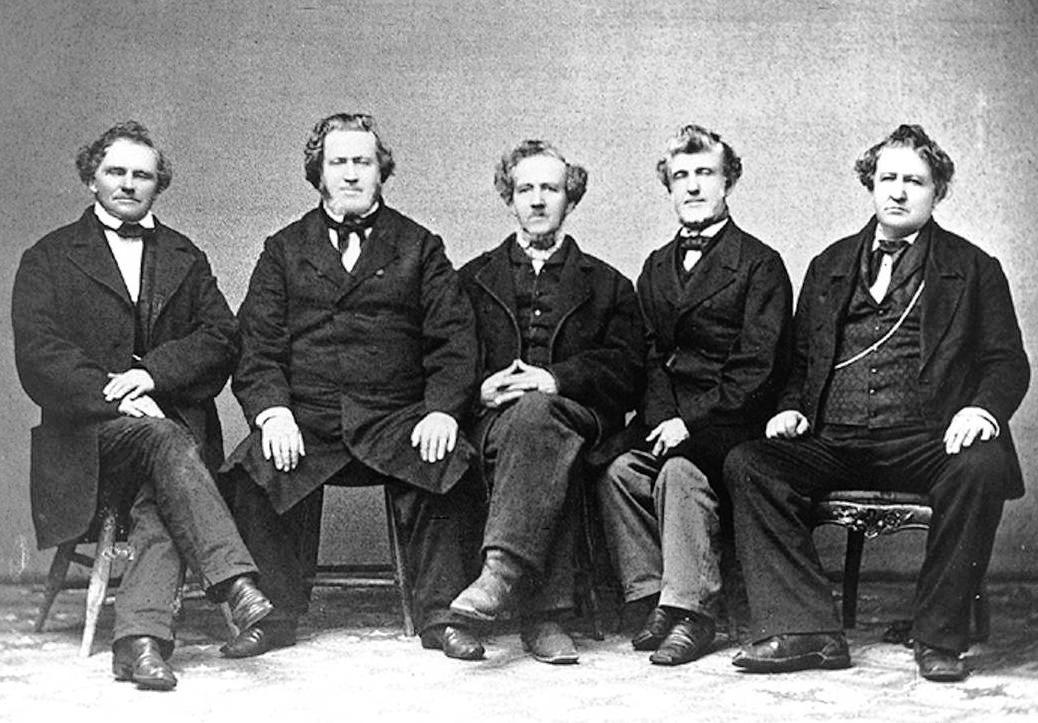
The five sons of John and Nabby Young From left to right: Lorenzo Dow, Brigham, Phineas H., Joseph, and John.

On April 15, 1832, Young and his brother John were baptized into the Latter Day Saint Church of Christ. His brother Joseph was baptized the next day and Brigham Young was baptized approximately one week later. Phineas' wife Clarissa was also baptized about this same time. Shortly after their baptisms, Phineas Young and Joseph Young became ordained elders in the church began preaching as missionaries in New York and Upper Canada.

While not on missions, Young lived with the Latter Day Saints in Kirtland, Ohio and Far West, Missouri. In 1835, the Three Witnesses selected Young as one of the inaugural members of the Quorum of the Twelve. However, church president Joseph Smith insisted that his brother William Smith be selected in place of Young.

In 1840, Young moved to Scott County, Illinois when the Latter Day Saints were expelled from Missouri. By 1841 he had relocated to Nauvoo. Later in 1841, Young served a mission to Cincinnati and its environs with Franklin D. Richards.

Young was married to Lucy, the half-sister of Oliver Cowdery. After Cowdery was excommunicated from the church in 1838, Young wrote him several letters pleading with him to come back into the church. Young was present in Richmond, Missouri when Cowdery died. Young testified that Cowdery's last statements were on the truth of Mormonism as revealed through Joseph Smith.

After Joseph Smith was killed in 1844, Young joined the majority of Latter Day Saints in accepting the leadership of Brigham Young and the Quorum of the Twelve Apostles. Phineas Young was among the first Mormon pioneer company to reach the Salt Lake Valley in July 1847. In this company, Young served as a captain of ten.

Young settled in Salt Lake City. He went on to become a missionary in England. In 1853, he became the second counselor to David Fullmer in the presidency of the Salt Lake Stake of the church. In 1855, he was elected to a term in the House of Representatives of the Utah Territorial Legislature.

From 1864 through 1871 Young served as the bishop of the Salt Lake City 2nd Ward. In Utah Territory, Young worked as a printer, saddler and contractor.

Young died in Salt Lake City, Utah Territory at the age of 80.
