= Phinehas Richards =

American politician

Phinehas H. Richards
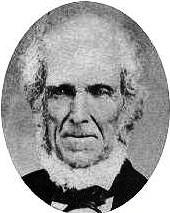
- Born: November 15, 1788; Framingham, Massachusetts
- Died: November 25, 1874 (aged 86)
- Occupation(s): Religious leader, City councilman (Nauvoo), Territorial legislator (Utah)

Phinehas Howe Richards (November 15, 1788 – November 25, 1874) was an early leader in the Church of Jesus Christ of Latter-day Saints (LDS Church) and in the Utah Territory. His first name is also spelled Phineas in some records.

Richards was born in Framingham, Middlesex County, Massachusetts. He was a brother of Willard Richards and the father of Franklin D. Richards. He married Wealthy Dewey in 1818. In, 1825 he was appointed county coroner. His oldest son, George Spencer Richards, died at age 15 at the Haun's Mill Massacre in 1838.

Richards joined the Church of the Latter Day Saints in 1837. He was a member of high councils at Kirtland, Nauvoo, Winter Quarters, and Salt Lake City. He also served as a member of the Nauvoo City Council. As a member of the Nauvoo City Council he cited the condition of his dead son in arguing why he viewed the Nauvoo Expositor as a nuisance that the city should protect.

In Utah he was part of the 1st territorial legislature, where he was also the chaplain. In 1844, Richards published an appeal to the citizens of Massachusetts asking them to take action on the matter of the wrongs Missouri had inflicted upon the Latter-day Saints.
