= Shumway Block =

- U.S. National Register of Historic Places
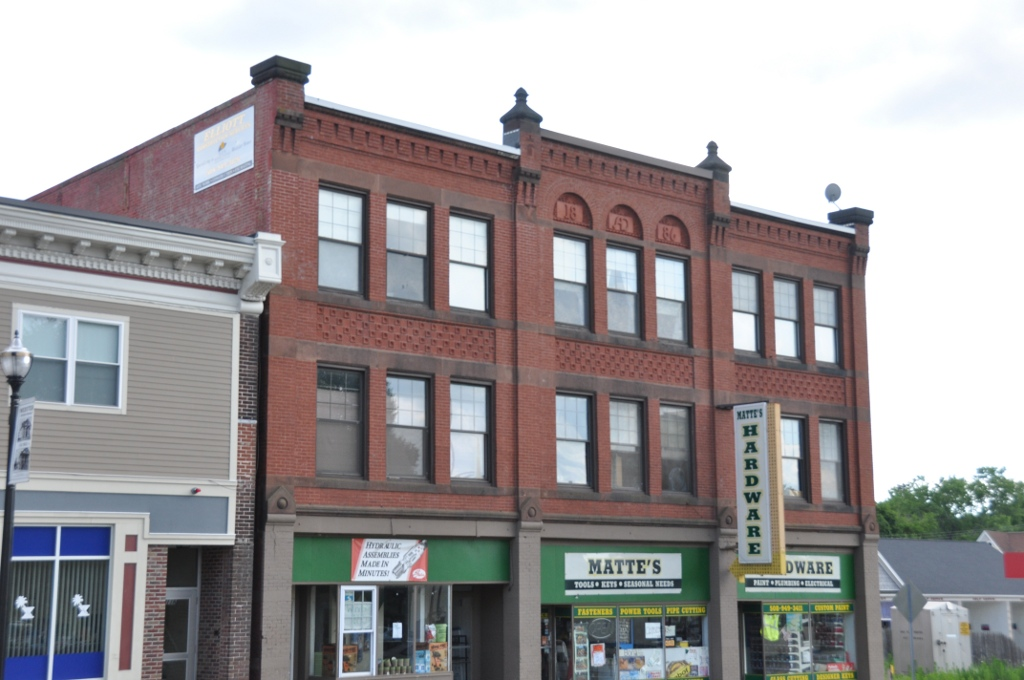

- Location within Massachusetts Location within the United States
- Location: 112–116 Main Street, Webster, Massachusetts
- Coordinates: 42°2′55″N 71°53′7″W
- Built: 1886
- Architectural style: Gothic, Queen Anne
- NRHP reference No.: 80000468
- Added to NRHP: December 3, 1980

The Shumway Block is a historic commercial building in Webster, Massachusetts. Built in 1887, it is a well-preserved local example of late Victorian commercial brick architecture, and has played a prominent role in the business economy of the Webster downtown's west end. The block was listed on the National Register of Historic Places in 1980.

== Description and history ==
The town of Webster's downtown area extends along Massachusetts Route 12, roughly from the French River and the railroad tracks running north-south just to its east, eastward toward Lake Street. The Shumway Block is located on the south side of the Street, just east of the railroad tracks. This area was not originally the center of Webster's economic activity, but became an important area when the railroad was built through the area. A wood-frame commercial building stood here for many years, and was a fixture of economic activity related to the railroad. It burned down in 1886, and the present Shumway Block was built on the site by Oscar Shumway, who had purchased the building in 1872.

The block is a three-story brick structure, nine bays wide, with a flat roof. Its facade is divided into three sections, articulated by stone piers on the first floor and brick pilasters on the upper levels. Each section has a commercial storefront on the first floor, with glass display windows and recessed entrances. Windows on the upper floors are grouped in threes, with stone lintels and sills. Decorative brick panelwork is found between the second and third floors, and there are half-round terra cotta panels above the three windows in the center section third floor. A band of corbelled brickwork runs below the roofline, and the central section has a parapet flanked by square posts with urns at the ends.

== See also ==
- National Register of Historic Places listings in Worcester County, Massachusetts
