= Theodemocracy =

Theocratic political system described by Joseph Smith

Theodemocracy is a theocratic political system proposed by Joseph Smith, the founder of the Latter Day Saint movement. According to Smith, a theodemocracy is a fusion of traditional democratic-republican principles under the US Constitution with theocratic rule.

Smith described it as a system under which God and the people held the power to rule in righteousness. Smith believed that to be the form of government that would rule the world upon the Second Coming of Christ. The polity would constitute the "Kingdom of God," which was foretold by the prophet Daniel in the Old Testament. Theodemocratic principles played a minor role in the forming of the State of Deseret in the American Old West.

== Political ideal ==
Early Latter Day Saints were typically Jacksonian Democrats and were highly involved in representative republican political processes. According to the historian Marvin S. Hill, "the Latter-day Saints saw the maelstrom of competing faiths and social institutions in the early 19th century as evidence of social upheaval and found confirmation in the rioting and violence that characterized Jacksonian America." Smith wrote in 1842 that earthly governments "have failed in all their attempts to promote eternal peace and happiness.... [Even the United States] is rent, from center to circumference, with party strife, political intrigues, and sectional interest."

Smith believed that only a government led by a deity could banish the destructiveness of unlimited factions and bring order and happiness to the earth. Church Apostle Orson Pratt stated in 1855 that the government of God "is a government of union." Smith believed that a theodemocratic polity would be the literal fulfilment of Christ's prayer in the Gospel of Matthew: "Thy kingdom come, Thy will be done in earth, as it is in heaven."

Further, Smith taught that the Kingdom of God, which he called the restored gospel of Jesus Christ, would hold dominion in the last days over all other kingdoms, as foretold in the Book of Daniel. Smith stated in May 1844, "I calculate to be one of the instruments of setting up the kingdom of Daniel by the word of the Lord, and I intend to lay a foundation that will revolutionize the world.... It will not be by sword or gun that this kingdom will roll on: the power of truth is such that all nations will be under the necessity of obeying the Gospel."

In 1859, Church President Brigham Young equated the terms "republican theocracy" and "democratic theocracy" and expressed his understanding of them when he taught, "The kingdom that the Almighty will set up in the latter days will have its officers, and those officers will be peace. Every man that officiates in a public capacity will be filled with the Spirit of God, with the light of God, with the power of God, and will understand right from wrong, truth from error, light from darkness, that which tends to life and that which tends to death.... They will say... '[T]he Lord does not, neither will we control you in the least in exercising your agency. We place the principles of life before you. Do as you please, and we will protect you in your rights....'"

The theodemocratic system was to be based on principles extant in the US Constitution and held sacred the will of the people and individual rights. Indeed, the United States and its Constitution in particular were revered by Smith and his followers.

However, in a theodemocratic system, God was to be the ultimate power and would give law to the people, who would be free to accept or reject, presumably based on republican principles. Somewhat analogous to a federal system within a theodemocracy, sovereignty would reside jointly with both the people and with God. Christ would be the "king of kings" and "lord of lords" but will only intermittently reside on Earth, and the government will largely be left in the hands of mortal men to govern themselves according to His teachings.

Young explained that a theodemocracy would consist of "many officers and branches... as there are now to that of the United States." It is known that the Council of Fifty, which Smith organized in Nauvoo, Illinois, in 1844, was meant to be the central municipal body within such a system. The council was led by Smith and included many members of the church's central leadership. However, it also included several prominent non-members. Full consensus was required for the council to pass any measures, and each participant was commanded to fully speak their minds on all issues brought before the body. The debate would continue until a consensus could be reached. However, if consensus could not be reached, Smith would "seek the will of the Lord" and break the deadlock through divine revelation.

On the day of the council's organization, John Taylor, Willard Richards, William W. Phelps, and Parley P. Pratt were appointed to a committee to "draft a constitution which should be perfect, and embrace those principles which the constitution of the United States lacked." Smith and other council members criticized the US Constitution for not protecting liberty with enough vigour. After the council's committee reported its constitution draft, Smith instructed the board to "let the constitution alone." He then dictated a revelation: "Verily thus saith the Lord, ye are my constitution, and I am your God, and ye are my spokesmen. From henceforth, do as I shall command you. Saith the Lord."

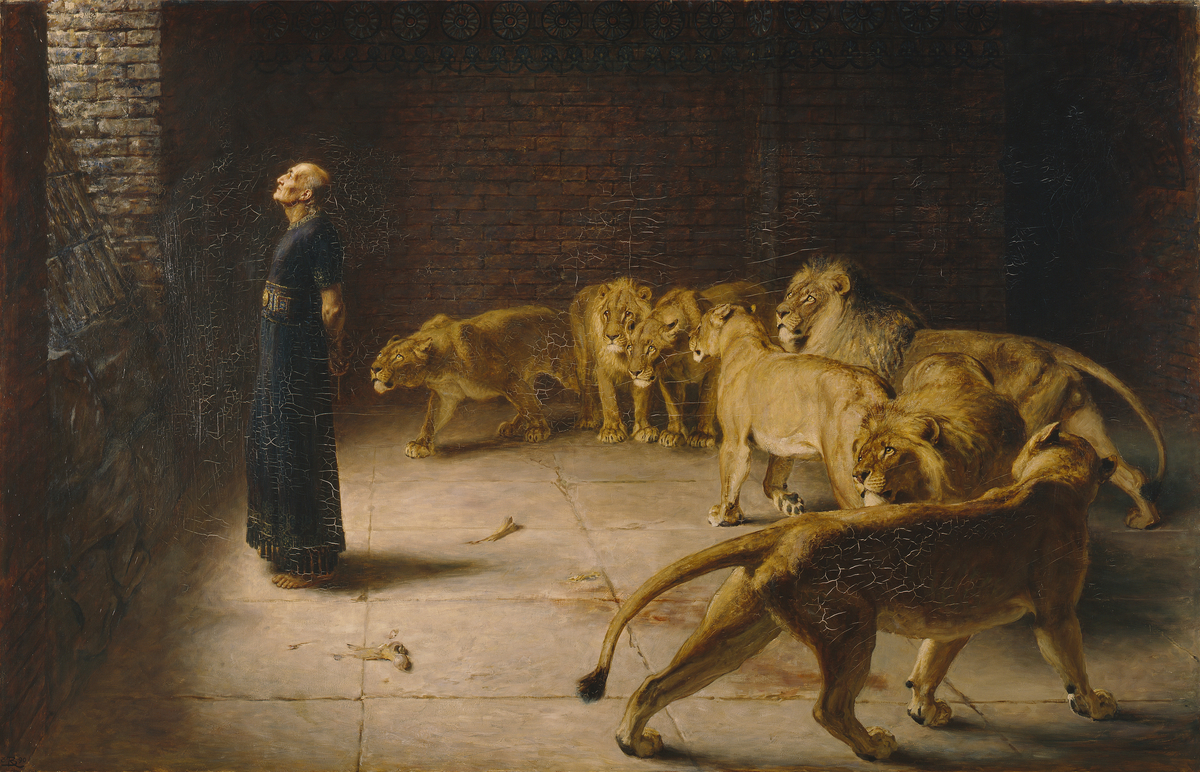
Daniel the Prophet. "And in the days of these kings shall the God of heaven set up a kingdom, which shall never be destroyed: and the kingdom shall not be left to other people, but it shall break in pieces and consume all these kingdoms, and it shall stand for ever." Daniel 2:44

Although theodemocracy was envisioned as a unifying force that would minimize faction, it should not be viewed as a repudiation of the individualistic principles underlying American liberalism. According to James T. McHugh, church theology was "comfortable... with [the] human-centric vision of both the Protestant Reformation and the liberal Enlightenment...." Smith's political ideal still held sacred church beliefs in the immutability of individual moral agency, which required, most importantly, religious freedom and other basic liberties for all people.

Therefore, such a government was never meant to be imposed on the unwilling or to be monoreligious. Instead, Smith believed that theodemocracy would be freely chosen by all, whether or not they were Latter Day Saints. That would be especially true when secular governments had dissolved and given way to universal anarchy and violence in the days preceding the Millennium. Smith and his successors believed that in the religiously pluralistic society that would continue even after Christ's return, theodemocracy demanded the representation of non-members by non-members.

Theodemocracy is a separate concept from the ideal Latter Day Saint community of Zion, which was not itself a political system but rather an association of the righteous. Theodemocracy, in turn, was not a religious organization but a governmental system that would potentially include people of many religious denominations and be institutionally separate from the Church of Jesus Christ of Latter-day Saints. Even in a government led by God, Smith seemed to support separation of function between church and state. Civil and ecclesiastical governments were meant to retain their individual and divided spheres of power in a theodemocratic system, but leaders of the Church would have important and even dominant secular roles within the political superstructure.

== History ==
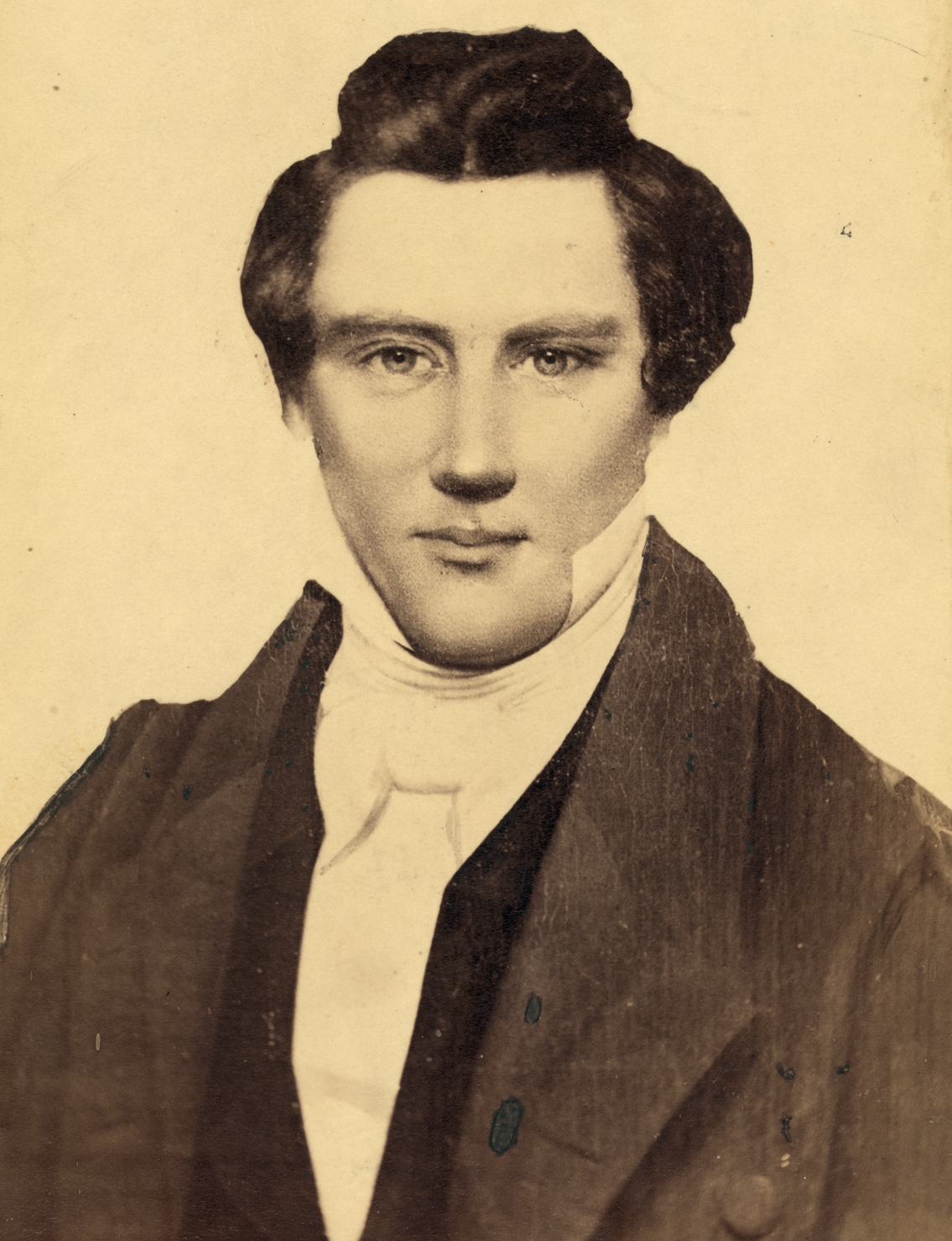
Joseph Smith coined the term "theodemocracy" and organized the Council of Fifty in 1844.

Smith first coined the term "theodemocracy" while he was running for President of the United States in 1844. It is also clear that the concept lay behind his organization of the Council of Fifty that same year, but it is uncertain whether Smith believed that he could or should form a functioning theodemocratic government before the advent of the Second Coming and the destruction of worldly political systems.

Once formed, the Council of Fifty had little actual power and was more symbolic of preparation for God's future kingdom than a functioning political body. The town of Nauvoo, where Smith organized the council, was governed according to a corporate charter received from the state of Illinois in 1841. The Nauvoo Charter granted a wide measure of home rule, but the municipality that it created was strictly republican in organization. Such an arrangement may reflect the Mormon history of persecution, with the form of the Nauvoo government developing as a practical self-defense mechanism, rather than as an absolute theological preference.

However, later critics labeled the town a "theocracy," mostly because of the position of many church leaders, including Smith, as elected city officials. That was a serious charge, as in Jacksonian America, anyone accused of theocratic rule was immediately suspect and deemed an antirepublican threat to the country. Suspicions about Mormon rule in Nauvoo, combined with misunderstandings about the role of the Council of Fifty, resulted in hyperbolic rumors about Smith's "theocratic kingdom." That, in turn, added to the growing furor against the Latter Day Saints in Illinois and eventually led to Smith's assassination in June 1844 and the Mormons' expulsion from the state in early 1846.

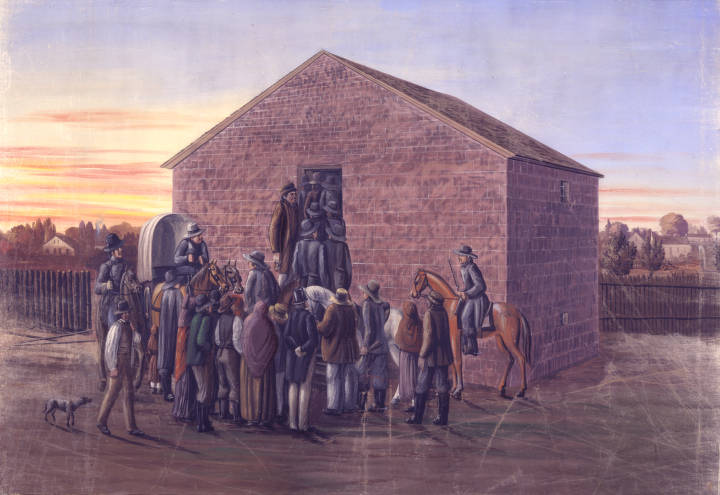
Liberty Jail, Missouri. Joseph Smith was jailed here during the winter of 1838–1839 on charges of "treason" that stemmed from the Mormon War of 1838 but were also due to Smith's belief in a political Kingdom of God.

Even before coining the term "theodemocracy," Smith's teachings about a political Kingdom of God had caused friction with non-Mormons, even before the Nauvoo period. As early as 1831, Smith recorded a revelatory prayer, which stated that "the keys of the kingdom of God are committed unto man on the earth.... Wherefore, may the kingdom of God go forth, that the kingdom of heaven may come...."

Smith believed that it was necessary for the Mormons at least to lay the foundations for the Kingdom of God before the Second Coming could occur. It remains unclear what he felt that those foundations must entail. Unfortunately, a lack of precise definitions sometimes exacerbate confusion on the issue. For instance, in another 1831 revelation, the "Kingdom" seems to be synonymous with the "Church." However, many LDS leaders went to great lengths to distinguish between the "Church of God," which was a spiritual organization that included both social and economic programs, and the "Kingdom of God," which was fully political and had yet to be fully organized.

In an 1874 sermon, Brigham Young taught that what the Mormons commonly called the "Kingdom of God" actually implied two structures. The first was the Church of Jesus Christ of Latter-day Saints, which had been restored through the prophet Joseph Smith. The second was the political kingdom described by Daniel, a theodemocratic polity that would one day be fully organized and, once initiated, would "protect every person, every sect, and all people upon the face of the whole earth, in their legal rights."

Nevertheless, the very concept of political power enforced by God through any human agency was rejected as obnoxious and highly dangerous by contemporary society. When Smith was arrested in connection with the Mormon War of 1838, he was closely questioned by the presiding judge on whether he believed in the kingdom that would subdue all others as described in the Book of Daniel. Smith's attorney, Alexander Doniphan, announced that if belief in such teachings were treasonous, the Bible must be considered a treasonable publication.

The development of theodemocracy was continued along with the development of Smith's community. Nauvoo was governed by a combination of church leaders and friendly non-Mormons who had been elected to serve in civil office might mark the city as a theodemocracy in embryo. Furthermore, Smith had anticipated that the Mormons would move west long before his murder, and he may have believed that he could create a theodemocratic polity somewhere outside of the United States in anticipation of Christ's return to earth. Smith's "last charge" to the Council of Fifty before his death was to "bear... off the Kingdom of God to all the world."

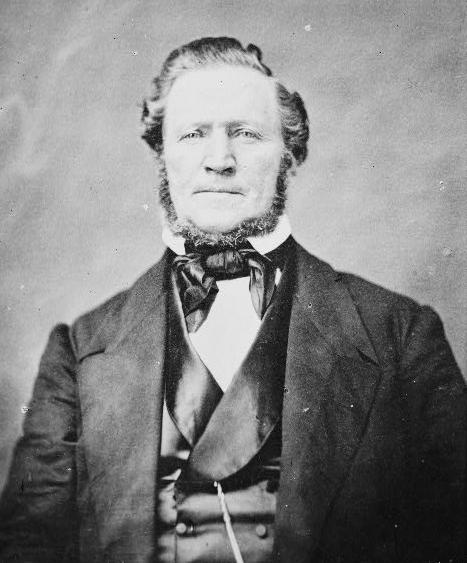
Brigham Young governed Utah influenced by theodemocratic principles

After Smith's death, the banner of theodemocracy was carried by his successor Brigham Young to Utah in 1847. Young's early conception of the State of Deseret was no doubt based on theodemocratic principles, but its practical application was severely hampered after Utah was made a territory in 1850 and was further eroded when Young was replaced as territorial governor after the Utah War of 1857–1858. However, even at an early stage, the Utah government never fully implemented Smith's theodemocratic vision. Like in Nauvoo, theodemocratic principles were mainly expressed by the election of church leadership to territorial office through republican processes. As before, the Council of Fifty remained essentially a "government in exile" with little real power. In 1855, one LDS Apostle explained that a "nucleus" of God's political kingdom had been formed, but that in no way challenged their loyalty to the government of the United States.

Mormon belief in an imminent Second Coming continued throughout the 19th century, and the expectation of the violent self-destruction of governments seemed to be confirmed by such events as the American Civil War. Orson Pratt taught that "not withstanding that it has been sanctioned by the Lord... the day will come when the United States government, and all others, will be uprooted, and the kingdoms of this world will be united in one, and the kingdom of our God will govern the whole earth... If the Bible be true, and we know it to be true." Thus, the LDS sincerely proclaimed in loyalty to the United States throughout the period but also expected its unavoidable collapse, along with other worldly governments. That, in turn, would require the Latter-day Saints to bring order to the resultant chaos and to "save the Constitution" by implementation of a true theodemocracy.

By the turn of the 20th century, Mormon expectations of an imminent Apocalypse had largely dissipated, and Utah's admission to the Union in 1896 required the removal of the last vestiges of theodemocracy from the local government. The Council of Fifty had not met since the 1880s, and it was technically extinguished when its last surviving member, Heber J. Grant, died in 1945. Thus, theodemocracy within the LDS church has slowly receded in importance. Mormons still believe that the Kingdom of God maintains the bifurcated definition espoused by Brigham Young, with both church and millennial government, but its political implications are now rarely alluded to. Rather, the kingdom predicted by the Prophet Daniel is commonly identified simply with the Church of Jesus Christ of Latter-day Saints. Theodemocracy has become a principle that, when discussed at all, is relegated to an indefinite future on which secular governments have already fully collapsed in the turbulent times before the Second Coming. Until then, injunctions within the church to "build up the Kingdom of God" refer purely to spiritual matters such as missionary work, and Joseph Smith's political ideal bears little weight in contemporary LDS political theory or objectives.

== See also ==
- Automatic theocracy
- Baháʼí administrative order
- Christian democracy, a political movement blending social democracy, social conservatism, Catholic social teaching and Neo-Calvinist principles
- Christian Reconstructionism, a Neo-Calvinist theonomic movement
- Christian republic
- Christian state, an officially Christian country
- Deseret Nationalism, an associated concept within alt-right LDS groups online.
- Dominion Theology
- Islamic democracy, a similar concept used by some political Islamists
- Kingdom of God: Latter-day Saints
- Postmillennialism
- Velayat-e Faqih, a similar concept used by the Islamic Republic of Iran
- White Horse Prophecy
