= Orson Spencer =

American Mormon leader (1802–1855)

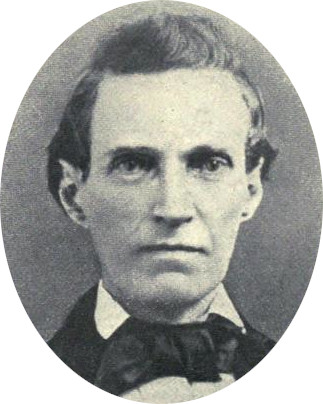
- Born: March 14, 1802; West Stockbridge, Massachusetts
- Died: October 15, 1855 (aged 53); St. Louis, Missouri

Orson Spencer (March 14, 1802 – October 15, 1855) was a prolific writer and prominent member of the Church of Jesus Christ of Latter-day Saints. He served in several highly visible positions within the church and left an extensive legacy of theological writings. Orson Spencer is one of the examples William Mulder cites of highly educated people becoming Mormons during the time of Joseph Smith

== Early life and education ==
Born in West Stockbridge, Berkshire County, Massachusetts, Spencer was generally esteemed a bright boy. At age twelve he contracted a fever that nearly killed him and left him with a permanent limp. At age fifteen, the town sheriff was so struck by him that he offered to finance Spencer's education. That same year he entered Lenox Academy. In 1824, Spencer graduated with honors from Union College at Schenectady, New York.

In 1825 Spencer took a job as a school teacher in Washington, Wilkes County, Georgia. While in Georgia he also began the study of law.

In 1827, Spencer joined the Baptist church and decided to become a pastor. He attended the theological college at Hamilton, New York (now known as Colgate University), and graduated as class valedictorian in 1829. Spencer served as pastor at three congregations throughout New England between 1829 and 1841.

== Religious conversion ==
Spencer was introduced to the Church of Jesus Christ of Latter-day Saints by his brother Daniel and was baptized by the same in spring 1841, necessitating the discontinuation of Orson's Baptist ministry. During his time of investigating the faith, Spencer obtained as much information as he could about Solomon Spalding and other items that called into question the divine origin of the Book of Mormon, but he was still convinced of its truthfulness by reading it.

News of Spencer's conversion reached many of his Baptist colleagues. Reverend William Crowell sent a letter inquiring about his conversion and the Mormon faith in general. Spencer's responses to this and other epistles were published and remain of interest to many Latter-day Saints today.

== Church service ==
Shortly after his conversion, Spencer and his family moved to Nauvoo, Illinois. Spencer served as the head of the University of Nauvoo. He also served as an alderman in Nauvoo. In April 1843 Spencer was sent on a mission to New Haven, Connecticut.

Spencer was elected mayor of Nauvoo in 1845, but he appears to not have served due to the revocation of the city charter. He would have succeeded his brother Daniel Spencer in this office. Prior to this he served as an alderman of the city of Nauvoo. As such he also served as a member of Nauvoo's municipal court. After the Nauvoo Charter was revoked Spencer served as an alderman of the much smaller town of Nauvoo.

Spencer served as president of the British Mission from early 1847 until the summer of 1848. During that time he also served as editor and publisher of the Millennial Star. In 1848 he was replaced by Orson Pratt, who found that the mission had had much success under Spencer's administration.

Spencer was the president of one of the five Mormon pioneer companies in 1849. This company consisted of about 100 wagons. In 1850, when the Deseret News began publication in Salt Lake City, Spencer served as assistant editor under Willard Richards.

Spencer was a member of the first legislative council of Utah Territory.

On August 28, 1852, Brigham Young commissioned Spencer to travel, together with Jacob Houtz, to Prussia. After reaching Berlin in late January 1853, he and his companion discovered that every step they took was observed by the Prussian secret police. After only one week, at the command of Karl Otto von Raumer—Secretary of Cultural Affairs—Spencer and Houtz were forced by the police to leave Berlin without having had any visible missionary success. They were the first Mormon missionaries to preach in Germany since Orson Hyde's visit in 1841.

Spencer served as an editor and writer on many newspapers from his conversion and was named the first chancellor of the University of Deseret in 1850.

Spencer went on a mission to Cincinnati in 1854. After being there a year he went to St. Louis where he replaced Erastus Snow as the regional church leader and editor of the St. Louis Luminary. He shortly afterward went on a mission to the Cherokee Nation, during which he contracted malaria. He then returned to St. Louis where he succumbed to this disease, dying on October 15, 1855, at the age of 53.

== Contributions to theology ==
Spencer's writings were an influential force in the formation of 19th-century Latter-day Saint theology. His statements about God the Father having a distinct place of dwelling but spreading forth his presence through the Holy Ghost were among the leading exposisitons of this Latter-day Saint view in the 1840s.

== Family ==
Spencer's first wife was Catherine Curtis (1811-1846). They had eight children. In January 1846, he married Eliza Ann Dibble (born August 16, 1829) in Nauvoo as a plural wife. Eliza was 16 years old when Orson married her. Catherine died in March 1846 while crossing Iowa. While presiding over the British Mission, Spencer married Martha Knight (born May 18, 1826). He later also married Margaret Miller, Jane T. Davis and Mary Hill as plural wives.

In 1855, shortly after his death, Spencer's daughter Catherine Curtis Spencer (named after her mother) married Brigham Young, Jr.

Spencer was the father of Aurelia Spencer Rogers, who in 1878 founded the Primary Association, the official organization of the LDS Church for children.

== Works remembered ==
A collection of his letters entitled Spencer's Letters was among the items placed in the capstone of the Salt Lake Temple.

== Sources ==
- Spencer, Orson. (1853). The Prussian Mission of The Church of Jesus Christ of Latter-Day Saints. Report of Elder Orson Spencer, A.B., to President Brigham Young. Liverpool: S.W.Richards
- Encyclopedia of Latter-day Saint Church History, p. 1173-1174.

Academic offices
Preceded by New Title	President of the University of Utah; 1850 – 1852	Succeeded by David O. Calder
