= Kingdom of God (Christian denominational variations) =

Christian denominational views on the Kingdom of God

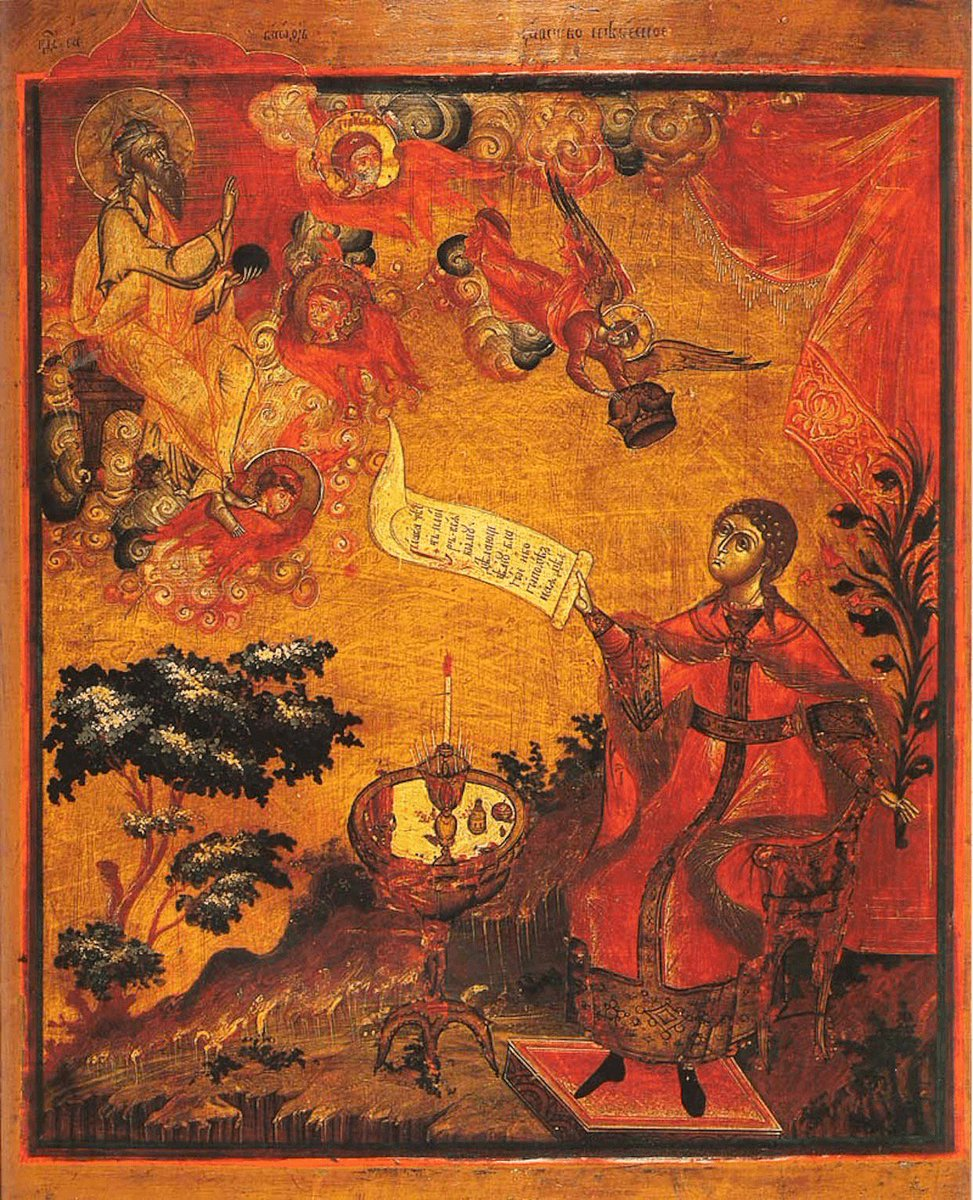
19th century Russian icon of Kingdom of Heaven

The Kingdom of God has different meanings in different Christian denominations and they interpret its meaning in distinctly different ways. While the concept of Kingdom of God may have an intuitive meaning to lay Christians, there is hardly any agreement among theologians about its meaning in the New Testament, and it is often interpreted to fit the theological agenda of those interpreting it.

As new Christian denominations have emerged, experiments linking personalism with ideas about the sharing of property found in the Acts of Apostles have produced eschatological perspectives that include social and philanthropic issues in the religious interpretation of the Kingdom of God.

== Overview ==
Given no general agreement on the interpretation of the term "Kingdom of God", significant diversity exists in the way Christian denominations interpret it and its associated eschatology. Over the centuries, as emerging Christian denominations introduced new concepts, their teachings and experiments with the linking of personalism with new notions of Christian community often involved new interpretations of the Kingdom of God in various socio-religious settings.

Thus the denominational attempt at incorporating the ideals expressed in the Acts of Apostles regarding the sharing of property within the Christian community came to interact with the social issues of the time to produce various interpretations regarding the establishment of the Kingdom of God on earth. Eschatological perspectives that emphasized the abandonment of the utopian visions of human achievement and the placement of hope in the work of God whose Kingdom were sought thus resulted in the linking of social and philanthropic issues to the religious interpretations of the Kingdom of God in ways that produced distinct variations among denominations.

== Specific interpretations ==
=== Anabaptists, Early Unitarians, Dissenters ===
In the Reformation the Radical Reformation of Anabaptists and Early Unitarians, and later Dissenters combined Christian mortalism with eschatological views emphasizing the future aspect of the kingdom of God and the Second Coming. For example, John Disney in his Reasons for quitting the Church of England (1873) speaks of "the future everlasting kingdom of God". Anabaptist descendants including the Amish, Old Order Mennonites, and Conservative Mennonites believe in the two kingdom concept which "essentially" views the Church as the Kingdom of God.

=== Catholics ===
The emblem of the Holy See includes the Keys of Heaven which Catholics interpret as those given to Saint Peter in Matthew 16:18

The Catechism of the Catholic Church (CCC) teaches that the coming Reign of God will be a kingdom of love, peace, and justice. Justice is defined as a virtue whereby one respects the rights of all persons, living in harmony and equity with all. The kingdom of God began with Christ's death and resurrection and must be further extended by Christians until it has been brought into perfection by Christ at the end of time.

Catholics do this by living the way Christ lived, by thinking the way Christ thought, and by promoting peace and justice. This can be accomplished by discerning how the Holy Spirit (God) is calling one to act in the concrete circumstances of one's life. Christians must also pray, asking God for what is necessary to cooperate with the coming of God's kingdom. Jesus gathered disciples to be the seed and the beginning of God's Reign on earth, and Jesus sent the Holy Spirit to guide them. Jesus continues to call all people to come together around him and to spread the kingdom of God across the entire world.

However, the ultimate triumph of Christ's kingdom will not come about until Christ's return to earth at the end of time. During Christ's second coming, he will judge the living and the dead. Only those who are judged to be righteous and just will reign with Christ forever. Christ's second coming will also mark the absolute defeat of all evil powers, including Satan. Until then, the coming of the kingdom will continue to be attacked by evil powers as Christians wait with hope for the second coming of their Savior.

=== Eastern Orthodoxy ===
Within the theological tradition of the Eastern Orthodox Church the kingdom of God is the present and future of all mankind and the created world. Eastern Orthodox Christians believe that the Kingdom of God is present within the Church and is communicated to believers as it interacts with them.

=== Jehovah's Witnesses ===
Jehovah's Witnesses believe that the kingdom of God is the central theme of the Bible, of Jesus' message while on earth, and of their own door-to-door preaching. They believe their door-to-door preaching is part of a "sign" before God's kingdom destroys the world's governments, in order to have God's will done on earth as it is in heaven.

God's kingdom is said to be an actual government, set up by God in heaven, that will rule over the earth after removing all human governments at Armageddon. Jesus Christ initially rules as king of the kingdom, with all authority in heaven and on earth delegated to him by God, with only God himself having more authority. Jesus rules along with 144,000 humans raised to heaven. These are said to be part of the "First Resurrection", as immortal spirit creatures. Jehovah's Witnesses believe that Jesus began ruling as king of God's kingdom in 1914.

Jesus' rule of the kingdom is to last for one thousand years, during which time earth will be transformed into a paradise. During that time, righteous and unrighteous humans—excluding those who died at Armageddon or other specific judgments by God—will be resurrected in perfect human bodies, which they call the "Second Resurrection". Jehovah's Witnesses believe that Satan will be imprisoned during the thousand-year reign, unable to influence humans. Perfect humans on earth will not get sick or age, but will not be immortal, and will need to eat and breathe in order to keep living.

=== The Church of Jesus Christ of Latter-day Saints ===
The Church of Jesus Christ of Latter-day Saints (LDS Church) takes a combined political/eschatological approach to the kingdom of God, emphasizing a physical reign of Jesus Christ on earth after the Second Coming of Christ. It also places special emphasis on the role of a restored kingdom of Israel.

The LDS Church considers the church itself as the kingdom of God on the earth. However, this is limited to a spiritual or ecclesiastical kingdom until the Millennium when Christ will also establish a political kingdom of God. This will have worldwide political jurisdiction when the Lord has made "a full end of all nations". However, Latter-day Saints believe that this theocratic "kingdom" will in fact be quasi-republican in organization (theodemocracy), and will be freely chosen by the survivors of the millennial judgments rather than being imposed upon an unwilling populace.

== See also ==
- Apocalypse
- Christian eschatology
- Christ the King
- Divine presence
- Eschatology
- Heaven (Christianity)
- Kingdom of heaven (Gospel of Matthew)
- Kingship and kingdom of God
- Queen of Heaven
- Sermon on the Mount
