= David Fullmer =

American politician

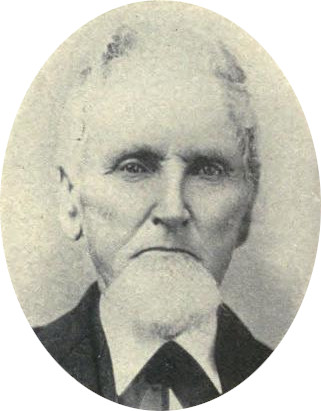
- Born: July 7, 1803; Chillisquaque, Pennsylvania
- Died: October 21, 1879 (aged 76); Salt Lake City, Utah
- Burial place: Salt Lake City Cemetery
- Occupations: Religious leader, City councilman (Nauvoo), Territorial legislator (Utah)

David Fullmer (July 7, 1803 – October 21, 1879) was an American politician, church leader, and farmer, born in Chillisquaque, Pennsylvania. He was the older brother of John S. Fullmer, another politician. Fullmer was a person of some importance in the early Latter Day Saint movement.

== Early childhood and career ==
David Fullmer was born on July 7, 1803, in Chillisquaque Creek, Northumberland County, Pennsylvania, to Peter Fullmer and Susannah Zerfoss. He spent his childhood and early adult years on his family's farm in Chillisquaque. By 1820, the Fullmers had moved to Huntingdon, Pennsylvania. In 1835, the family moved from Pennsylvania to Jefferson Township, Richland County, Ohio, where he learned about the Church of Christ.

Fullmer was brought up on a farm and received a common-school education. In addition to farming, he also taught school and went into merchandising.

On September 18, 1831, Fullmer married Rhoda Ann Marvin. Fullmer was baptized September 16, 1836, by Henry G. Sherwood.

== Involvement in early Mormonism ==
In 1836, Fullmer traveled to Kirtland, Ohio, where he met Joseph Smith for the first time. Shortly afterward, on February 22, 1837, he was ordained an elder under the hands of Reuben Hedlock in Kirtland. He also received a patriarchal blessing from Patriarch Joseph Smith, Sr.

In September 1837, he removed to Caldwell County, Missouri, to be near the site that Joseph Smith had revealed as the principal gathering place of the Saints. In the spring of 1838 he moved to Daviess County in the same state. The following summer he had a severe attack of sickness which threatened his life, but his health was restored.

With mounting opposition between the newcomer Latter-day Saints and the "old settlers" of Missouri, and after Missouri Governor Lilburn W. Boggs issued Missouri Executive Order 44, Fullmer was compelled with the rest of the Saints to leave his home and possessions in Missouri. With the Saints, he went to the state of Illinois, where he left his family and then continued to Ohio to assist in moving his father to Illinois. He and his family eventually settled in Nauvoo, Illinois. During this time, Fullmer was ordained to the office of high priest in 1839 and appointed to the high council in the Nauvoo Stake. He also joined the Nauvoo Masonic Lodge. His sister, Desdemona Wadsworth Fullmer Smith, married Joseph Smith as one of his plural wives during this time.

In 1844, Fullmer was appointed to be one of the electioneering missionaries in behalf of Joseph Smith's candidacy for President of the United States. He was engaged in this labor and in preaching in the state of Michigan when he received news of the martyrdom of Joseph Smith. Fullmer immediately returned to his home in Nauvoo and attended the general meeting of the Church, at which the claims of Sidney Rigdon to be guardian of the Church were rejected by vote of the conference, and the Twelve Apostles, with Brigham Young presiding, were sustained as the pro temp leaders of the Church. In the ensuing schism, Fullmer, along with a majority of the Saints, would side with Brigham Young as the rightful successor to the presidency and prophetic mantle of Joseph Smith.

== Plural marriage ==
After having been married for fourteen years to Rhoda Marvin, Fuller entered into polygamist marriages with Margaret Phillips and Sarah Oysterbanks in Nauvoo. On January 19, 1846, all three wives were sealed to him, for eternity, in the then-newly completed Nauvoo Temple.

Fullmer divorced Margaret Phillips in 1848, without the two having had any known children. With his other two wives, however, Fullmer had twenty children altogether: eleven with Rhoda Marvin, and nine with Sarah Oysterbanks.

== Civic, theocratic, and ecclesiastical engagements ==
Fullmer was a member of the Nauvoo City Council, and later, after the Illinois Legislature repealed the Nauvoo city charter, he was elected to the Nauvoo town council. He was also a member of the Council of Fifty, a theocratic representation of and preparation for what Joseph Smith perceived as the impending Millennial Kingdom of Jesus Christ.

== Expulsion and trek to Utah ==
In the winter of 1846, with the Saints threatened with expulsion from Nauvoo, Brigham Young led church members into the western frontier to find a new home for the Saints. Fullmer was appointed "captain" over a company of one hundred pioneers, Brigham Young organizing the traveling Saints after the camp of Israel described in the Book of Exodus.

In 1846, it was decided that a temporary settlement was needed as a resting place for the rear company of Saints and all those who, from lack of means, were unable to proceed further. To this end, Garden Grove, Iowa, was established, with Samuel Bent appointed as president and Fullmer as his first counselor. Here the exiled Saints made a large farm and worked together to raise grain. There were many poor among them who were destitute for food and clothing. When President Bent died shortly after the settlement was established, the presidency passed to Fullmer. In his capacity, he sent "missionaries along the great rivers to solicit aid for the poor."

The company moved to another temporary settlement called Winter Quarters, Nebraska, on the Missouri River. Fullmer served on the "vigilance committee" at Winter Quarters before making his way to present-day Utah.

After arriving to the main settlement then known as Great Salt Lake City in 1848, Fullmer was appointed first counselor to Daniel Spencer, president of the Salt Lake Stake, in 1849. He also served on the State of Deseret legislature. At this time, when Church leaders also served as community leaders, there was a fusion of church and state, Fullmer continuing his role in the theocratic government known as the Council of Fifty.

Fullmer continued his overland travels in service to his church and people. For five months during the winter, he journeyed south with an exploring expedition, serving as counselor to Parley P. Pratt. Fullmer would later serve as captain over a relief company, traveling east to Independence Rock to assist a company of Saints who were journeying westward.

When the territory of Utah was created, Fullmer was elected a member of the legislature for Salt Lake County. He also served as treasurer pro temp of Salt Lake County, treasurer of Salt Lake City, a delegate to one of the early territorial conventions, and director of the Agricultural Society.

== Stake president ==
In 1852, stake president Daniel Spencer was called on a mission to Great Britain, and Fullmer became acting president of the stake (1852–56). In the general church conference held April 7, 1853, David Fullmer was formally sustained as the fourth president of the Salt Lake Stake. A special conference was convened under the direction of President Brigham Young on August 13, 1853, at which time Thomas Rhoads and Phineas H. Young were sustained as Fullmer's counselors.

When community problems arose they were often solved by the local church leaders. For example, a resolution of the brethren of the Mill Creek Ward passed on January 29, 1853, explained the necessity of calling a general meeting for discussion of uniform prices for agricultural products and standard wages for mechanical labor and related services. Such a meeting was subsequently held on February 3, 1853, where the "Deseret Agricultural Society" was formed for the purpose of carrying out the resolutions of the farmers.

During the three and a half years President Fullmer presided over Salt Lake Stake he organized two new wards: 5th Ward (previously authorized, but not made an active ward until 1853) and the Sugar House Ward in 1854. The stake then had a total of twenty-nine wards when President Spencer returned. None of the wards had been transferred or discontinued. President Fullmer appointed four members of the high council during his presidency and twenty new bishops.

As the officers of Salt Lake Stake were presented during the semiannual conference of the Church held October 8, 1853, as was the usual practice, it was reported that there were three members of the First Presidency and nine members of the Council of the Twelve who resided and had their membership in Salt Lake Stake. Members of the Council of the Twelve attended the annual meeting of the 14th Ward on December 26, 1853. After certain matters of business were attended to and some spiritual talks given, dancing and social activities were enjoyed by all.

== Later life, death ==
Several years before his death, Fullmer was ordained a patriarch.

David Fullmer died in Salt Lake City on October 21, 1879. He was 76 years of age. His funeral was on Thursday, October 23, 1879, in the Salt Lake Sixth Ward Chapel, at 1 pm, with several prominent members of the LDS Church in attendance. He was buried in the Salt Lake City Cemetery in the Family Plot.
