= Shumway, Arizona =

Census-designated place in Navajo County, Arizona, United States

- Census-designate place
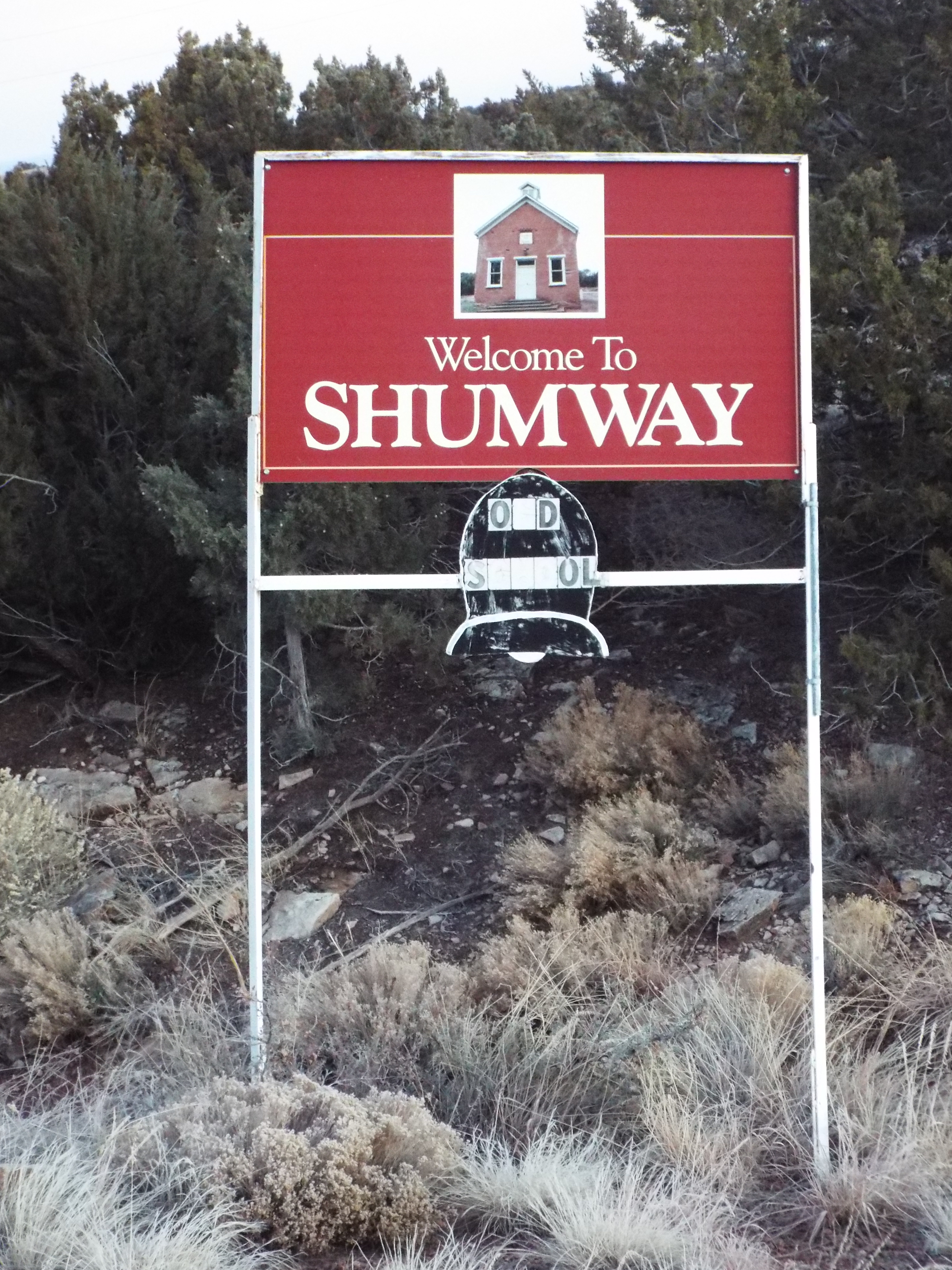
- Welcome to Shumway

- Location within the state of Arizona Shumway (the United States)
- Coordinates: 34°24′52″N 110°03′54″W
- Country: United States
- State: Arizona
- County: Navajo

Area
  - Total: 2.94 sq mi (7.61 km^{2})
  - Land: 2.94 sq mi (7.61 km^{2})
  - Water: 0 sq mi (0.00 km^{2})
- Elevation: 5,863 ft (1,787 m)

Population (2020)
  - Total: 347
  - Density: 118/sq mi (45.6/km^{2})
- Time zone: UTC-7 (Mountain (MST))
  - Summer (DST): UTC-7 (MST)
- Area code: 928
- FIPS code: 04-66540
- GNIS feature ID: 2805228

Shumway, also known as Shumay, is a census-designated place (CDP) in Navajo County, Arizona, United States. It was named after Charles Shumway, a member of the Church of Jesus Christ of Latter-day Saints, who settled the location.

== Demographics ==
Historical population
Census	Pop.	Note	%±
2020	347		—
U.S. Decennial Census

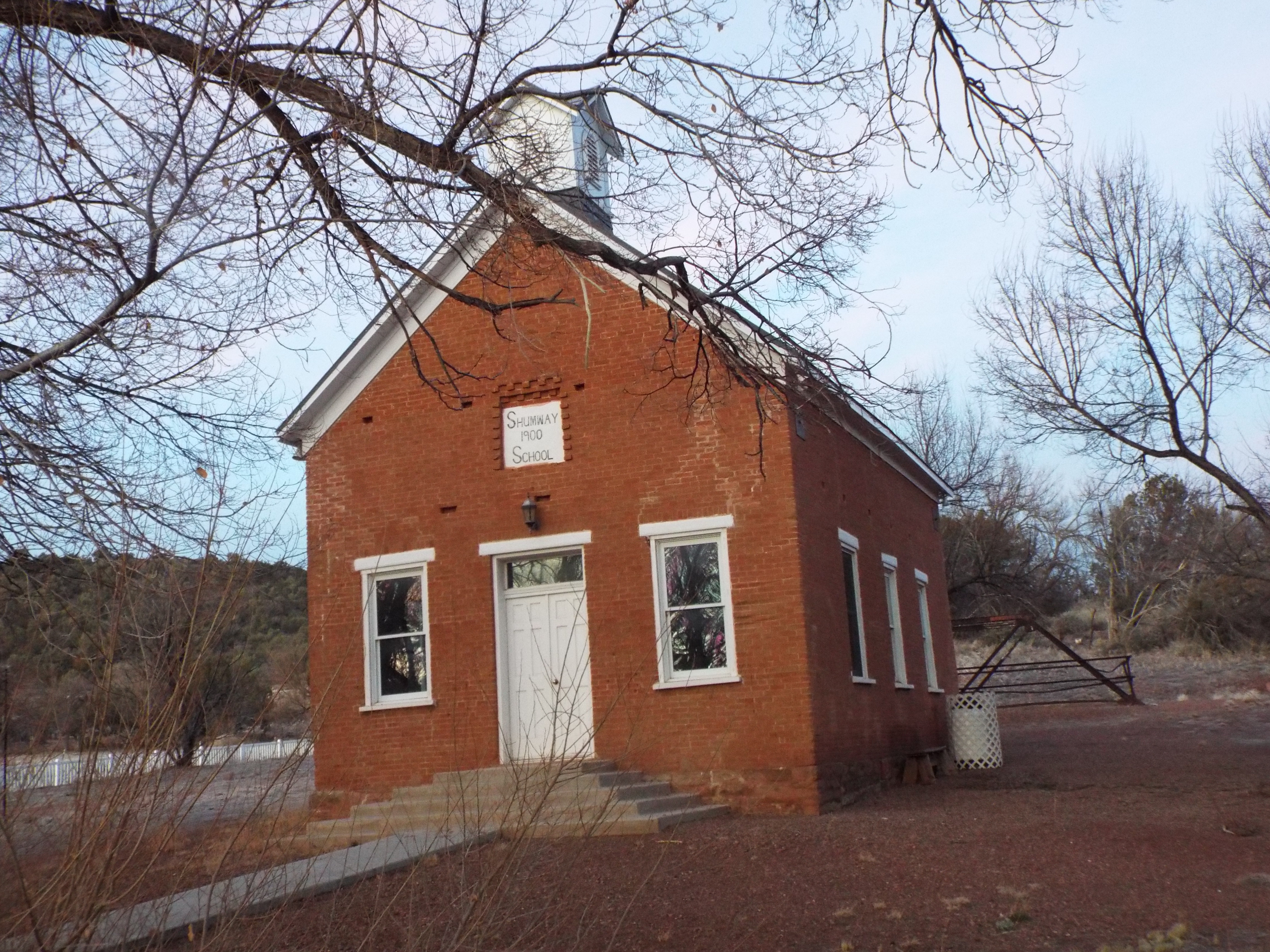
The historic Shumway Schoolhouse

== See also ==
- List of census-designated places in Arizona
