= John S. Fullmer =

American politician

John Solomon Fullmer
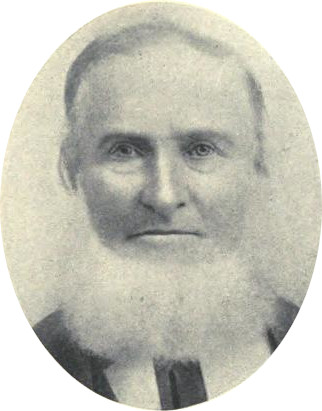
- Born: July 21, 1807; Huntington, Pennsylvania
- Died: October 8, 1883 (aged 76); Springville, Utah
- Occupation: Politician
- Known for: Was a member of the Council of Fifty and an American politician who served in the Utah Territorial House of Representatives from Davis County.
- Spouse: 3
- Children: 33

John Solomon Fullmer (July 21, 1807 – October 8, 1883) was an American politician and farmer, born in Huntington, Pennsylvania. He was the younger brother of David Fullmer, another politician, and Desdemona Wadsworth Fullmer Smith, a plural wife of Joseph Smith, the founder of the Latter Day Saint movement.

== Early childhood and career ==
Fullmer spent his childhood and early adult years on his family's farm in Huntington, Pennsylvania. In 1830, his father, Peter, moved the family from Pennsylvania to Jefferson Township, Richland County, Ohio. In 1832, John left Ohio for Nashville, Tennessee, where he intended to study for the Baptist Ministry. However, after arriving in Nashville, John took a job at the "Banner" newspaper and became an established and respected member of the Nashville community. Fullmer established Fullmer and Mitchell, a mercantile business, with a partner in 1836 and was married to Mary Ann Price, the daughter of a wealthy planter, on May 24, 1837, in Nashville.

== Religion and Nauvoo years ==
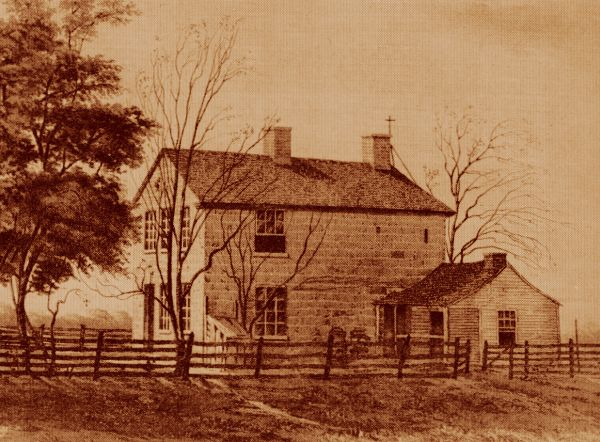
An etching of the Cartage Jail, c. 1885, where John S. Fullmer had stayed with Joseph Smith and where Smith was killed on June 27, 1844

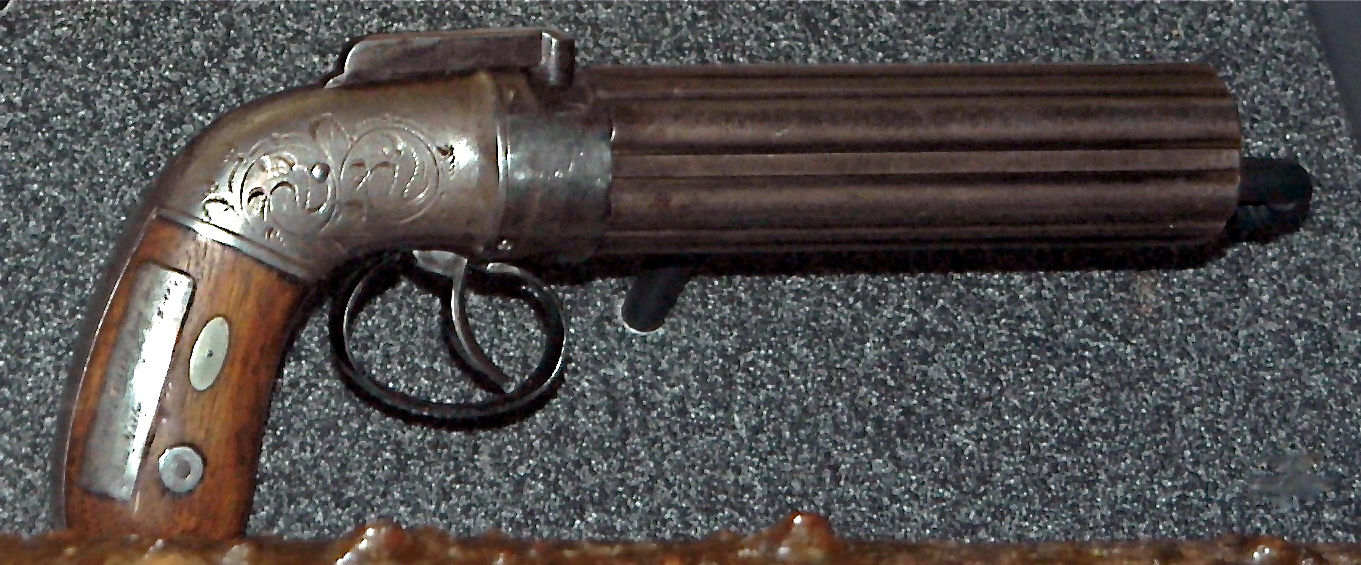
Gun used in Carthage jail defense

The Fullmers heard about the Latter Day Saint movement and became members while living in Jefferson Township. Fullmer visited his family, who had moved from Ohio, in Nauvoo, Illinois, in 1839 and was baptized by Smith on July 29, 1839, before returning to Nashville to assist his wife and their two daughters, Lavina Elizabeth and Johanna, in moving to Nauvoo. While living in Nauvoo, Fullmer was closely associated with Smith and served for a while as his private secretary. While living in Nauvoo, Fullmer left to serve as a missionary to Pennsylvania in 1842 and Vermilion County, Illinois, in 1845.

Fullmer had been living on a farm four miles from Nauvoo when, on June 25, 1844, Smith and his brother, Hyrum Smith, were arrested. As an officer in the Nauvoo Legion, he had been on duty during the time the city was under martial law. Because of his friendship with the brothers, Fullmer was one of those who accompanied the Smiths to Carthage Jail. He spent the day and night before the martyrdom with them there. On the morning of the day they were assassinated, June 27, he was sent on an errand by Joseph and he left his gun with them. Hyrum used the gun to defend himself later that day.

Fullmer wrote that when the Smiths had first been jailed, they had been incarcerated on a riot charge and bail had been set at $500 each, which was about two and one half times as much as normal bail. Fullmer said "It was evident that the magistrate intended to outreach the pile of the brethren, so as to imprison those on trial for want of bail; but it happened that there was strength to cover the demand. I went to the full extent of my worth; so did others – and the prisoners were all released. But Joseph and Hyrum having been arrested in the first instance on two charges, one for riot, the other for treason, were now not suffered to enjoy their liberty after the first examination and release; and were almost immediately taken in charge by a constable."

Fullmer told of lying on the floor next to Joseph during the night before the assassination. "He laid his right arm out for me to lay my head upon it..... After the brethren were all quiet and seemed asleep, excepting myself, he talked with me a little about the prospects of his deliverance. He did not say he knew that he had to die, but he inferred as much, and finally said he 'would like to see his family again," and he 'would to God that he could preach to the saints once more in Nauvoo".

The next morning, Joseph sent Fullmer to Nauvoo to assist in obtaining witnesses for a treason hearing scheduled for June 29. Fullmer obtained a change of clothes so that he could be dressed properly when attending the hearing. When he returned to the jail later that day, he was refused admission by the guards and, as a result, missed the mob's attack on the jailhouse. Fullmer later stated that had this not happened, there was a hundred chances to one that he would have shared the same fate as the Smiths.

Fullmer remained in Nauvoo until 1847 and was appointed to act as a trustee of the church, including handling church business such as disposing of property for the Mormons during and after their exodus from Nauvoo. He served in this capacity with Almon W. Babbitt, Joseph L. Heywood, Henry W. Miller, and John M. Bernhisel.

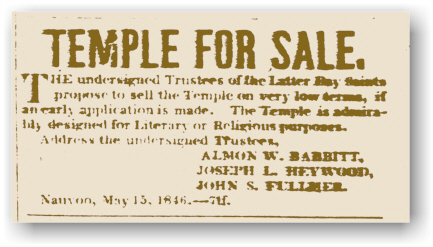

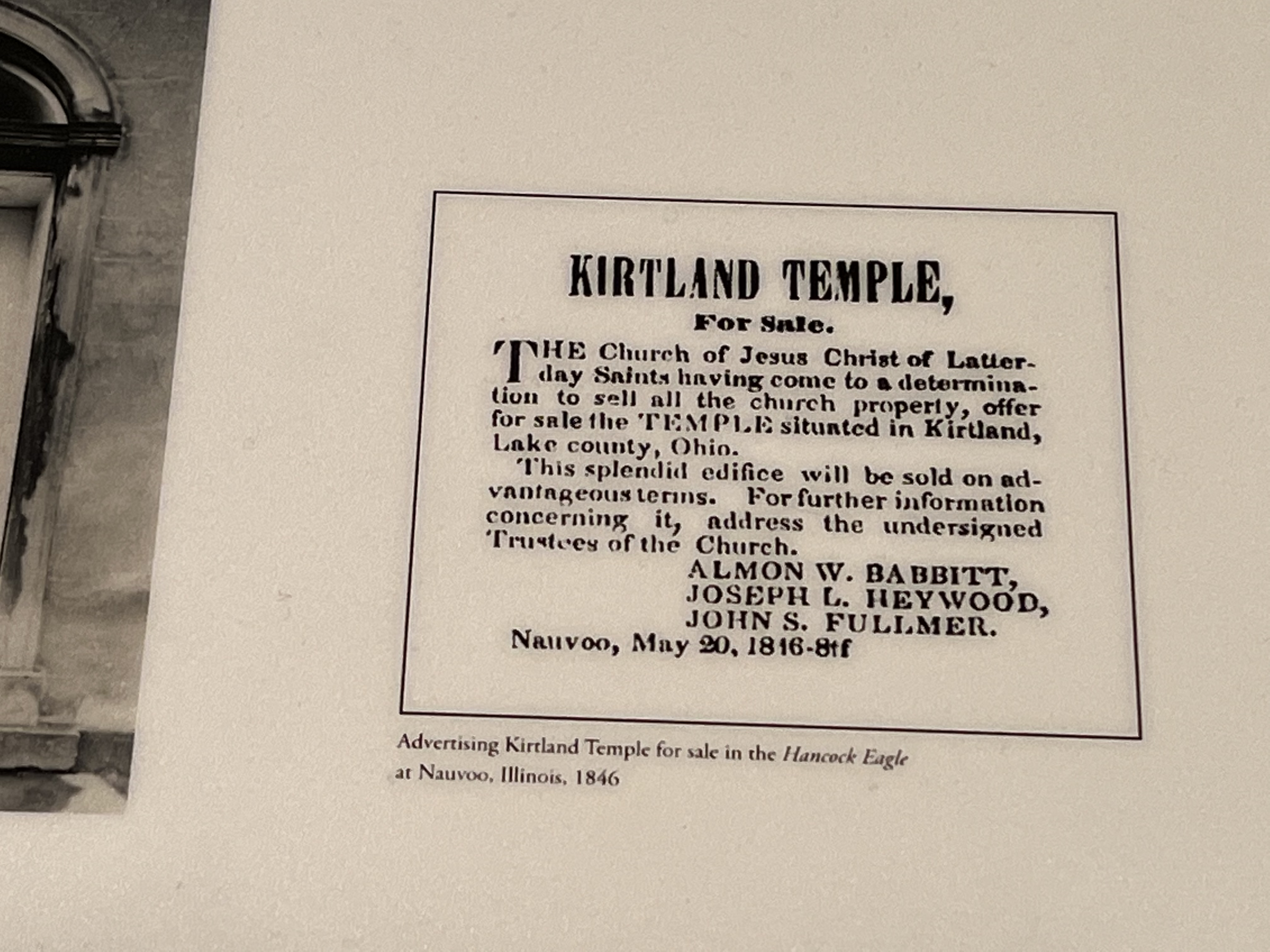

Fullmer married Olive Amanda Smith Cook on January 21, 1846, in Nauvoo, Illinois. She was Fullmer's second wife under the early practice of plural marriage.

== Utah years ==
Fullmer crossed the plains to Utah with his family in 1848 and settled in Davis County, where he was actively involved in the political affairs of the territory and assisted in the drafting of a constitution for the provisional State of Deseret and the Utah Territory. Fullmer briefly served in the Utah Territorial House of Representatives from Davis County, while his brother, David, served in the House for Salt Lake County. Fullmer again served as a missionary from 1852 to 1855, this time to England. After his return, Fullmer married his third wife, Sarah Ann Stevenson, on October 12, 1856, in Salt Lake City, Utah.

After returning to Utah, he moved his family to Springville, Utah, where he lived until his death on October 8, 1883. He is buried in the Springville Evergreen Cemetery with his first wife, Mary Ann, who died on November 29, 1897. Fullmer had a thirty-three children with his three wives. The three wives did not share the same household, however, but lived approximately 30 miles apart.

== See also ==
- Battle Creek, Utah
