= Elisha H. Groves =

American politician

Elisha Hurd Groves (November 5, 1797 – December 29, 1867), at times misidentified as Elisha B. Groves, was a 19th century mid-level leader in the Church of Jesus Christ of Latter-day Saints (LDS Church) and a member of the first Utah Territorial Legislature. He spent most of his life working as a farmer.

Groves was a native of Madison County, Kentucky. By the time he was 22 he had moved to Indiana. In 1825, he married Sarah Hogue. They divorced in 1833. At that time, he was a Presbyterian. On March 1, 1832, he was baptized into the LDS Church by Calvin Beede in Greene County, Indiana.

Groves joined the LDS Church in the early 1830s and was involved in missionary work in Kentucky, Tennessee, and Missouri. He served as a missionary with Morris Phelps in Calhoun County, Illinois in 1834, where they baptized 16 people. In 1836, Groves married Lucy Simmons. When not on missions, Groves lived in Kirtland, Ohio for a time and then moved to Caldwell County, Missouri in 1836 and to Davies County, Missouri in 1838.

In 1839 Groves settled at Columbus, Illinois. He served a mission in northern Illinois later that year.

In 1840, Groves was one of the earliest LDS Church missionaries to serve in Wisconsin Territory. He moved to Nauvoo, Illinois in 1842. He continued to often serve missions in various parts of Illinois until 1844. He was involved in the settlement of Mount Pisgah, Iowa in 1846.

He arrived in Utah in 1848 moving southward to Iron County, Utah in 1850 and settling at New Harmony, Utah in what is now Washington County, Utah in 1853.

In Utah Territory, Groves not only served in the territorial legislature but also as the patriarch of the stake in Iron County, Utah.
