= Daniel Spencer (Mormon) =

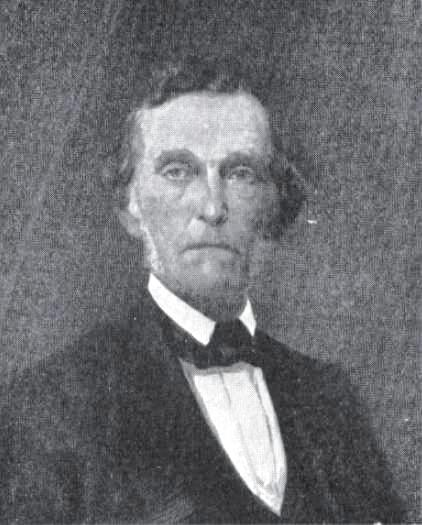

Daniel Spencer (July 20, 1794 – December 8, 1868) was the last mayor of Nauvoo, Illinois prior to the revocation of its first charter.

Spencer was born in West Stockbridge, Massachusetts. In 1840, he joined the Church of Jesus Christ of Latter Day Saints. He soon after baptized his brother Orson Spencer.

Spencer served as a missionary to Canada in 1841.

Spencer left Nauvoo in February 1846. In Winter Quarters, Nebraska he served as a bishop. He arrived in the Salt Lake Valley in 1847 with the Perrigrine Sessions Mormon pioneer company.

From 1852 to 1856 Spencer served as a missionary in the British Isles.

From 1849 to 1868 he served as president of the Salt Lake City Stake of the LDS Church. He served in the Utah Territorial House of Representatives in 1851.
