= Council of Fifty =

Former Latter Day Saint organization symbolizing Zion on earth

- Title page from the 1844 Council of Fifty meetings minutes book
- Formation: 1844
- Founder: Joseph Smith
- Founded at: Nauvoo, Illinois
- Dissolved: 1884
- Purpose: To symbolize and represent a future Latter-day Saint theocratic or theodemocratic "Kingdom of God" on the earth, as a legislative body, and to assist in Joseph Smith's 1844 campaign for President of the United States
- Headquarters: Nauvoo, Illinois Salt Lake City, Utah
- 1st President of the Church Council: Joseph Smith (1844)
- 2nd President of the Church Council: Brigham Young (1847-1877)
- 3rd President of the Church Council: John Taylor (1880-1884)
- Key people: Joseph Smith Brigham Young John Taylor
- Parent organization: The Church of Jesus Christ of Latter-day Saints

"The Council of Fifty" (also known as "the Living Constitution", "the Kingdom of God", or its name by revelation, "The Kingdom of God and His Laws with the Keys and Power thereof, and Judgment in the Hands of His Servants, Ahman Christ") was a Latter Day Saint organization established by Joseph Smith in 1844 to symbolize and represent a future theocratic or theodemocratic "Kingdom of God" on the earth. Smith prophetically claimed that this Kingdom would be established in preparation for the Millennium and the Second Coming of Jesus.

The Kingdom of God, organized around the Council of Fifty, was meant to be a force of peace and order in the midst of this chaos. According to Latter-day Saint teachings, while Jesus himself would be king of this new world government, its structure was in fact to be quasi-republican and multi-denominational; therefore, the early Council of Fifty included both members and non-members of The Church of Jesus Christ of Latter-day Saints. Although the Council played a significant role during the last few months of Joseph Smith's life, particularly in his campaign for President of the United States, the Council's role was mostly symbolic throughout the 19th century within The Church of Jesus Christ of Latter-day Saints. This was largely because the Council was primarily meant for a time when secular governments had ceased to function. Regular meetings of the Council ended in 1884 after the church publicly abandoned its theocratic aspirations. Some contend that the organization was technically extinguished when member Heber J. Grant died in 1945.

== Establishment ==
In early Mormonism, God's Kingdom was thought of as an amalgamation between two distinct yet intimately related parts. The first is the Spiritual Kingdom of God which is represented on earth by the Church of Christ. This, latter-day saints believe, was described in the Book of Daniel 2:44–45 as the stone "cut out of the mountain without hands" that will roll forth to fill the whole earth. In Daniel, this kingdom was never to "be destroyed; and the kingdom shall not be left to other people, but it shall break in pieces and consume all these kingdoms, and it shall stand forever." However, in conjunction with this Spiritual Kingdom, Joseph Smith and other early Latter Day Saint leaders believed that Jesus would establish a Political Kingdom of God in the turbulent times leading up to His second coming. God's Political Kingdom was to be centered around the Council of Fifty.

Like many in the mid-19th century, the Latter-Day Saints believed that the second coming of Jesus was imminent, and would be attended by great destruction. After this destruction occurred, some structure would be necessary to politically organize the survivors. Joseph Smith said he received a revelation on April 7, 1842 calling for the establishment of an organization called the Living Constitution, or later the Council of Fifty. This would serve as the foundation for the establishment of Christ's Millennial government.

Initially, the Council of Fifty organized to discuss potential plans for resettling Latter-day Saints somewhere further West if departing Nauvoo became necessary; they also coordinated Smith's presidential campaign.

On March 26, 1844, Smith may have conferred the keys of ecclesiastical authority on the Twelve Apostles during a meeting of the Council of Fifty.

== Composition and organization ==
Unlike other purely religious organizations formed by Joseph Smith, members of the Council of Fifty were not necessarily Latter Day Saints. At its formation, there were three non-Mormon members: Marenus G. Eaton, who had revealed a conspiracy against Smith by Nauvoo dissenters; Edward Bonney, whose brother was a Mormon but who later acted as prosecutor against Smith for his role in the destruction of the Nauvoo Expositor; and Uriah Brown. Their admittance reflected Mormon teachings that the Millennial theocracy would be multi-denominational, though Jesus himself would be king. Although Brigham Young did not admit non-Mormons to the Council during his administration, he invited both Mormons and non-Mormons to be part of the theocracy, and even part of the theocratic government. All three nonmembers would be expelled in early 1845 once Brigham Young became chairman of the council.

The Council of Fifty met irregularly for most of its forty-year existence, including March–June 1844, 1845–1846, more regularly from 1848 to 1850, then only a handful of times between 1851 and 1868. The council was reconstituted under President John Taylor in April 1880 and met more regularly for another five years.

Alpheus Cutler referred to an executive council within the Council of Fifty, which he termed the "Quorum of the Seven". Willard Richards served as historian/recorder from 1844 to his death in 1854. George Q. Cannon was the final recorder for the Council and served from 1867 to his death in 1901. William Clayton served as clerk of the Kingdom from 1844–1879. In 1880, he was followed in office by L. John Nuttall. John Taylor's son William Whittaker Taylor was assistant clerk from 1880-1884.

There are forty-six known members of the Council of Fifty prior to Joseph Smith's violent death. It included all members of the Quorum of the Twelve Apostles at the time in which it was active both in Nauvoo and in Utah. Notably, it did not include the two counselors to the First Presidency in Nauvoo, Sidney Rigdon and William Law. Other members included:

- John Milton Bernhisel
- William Clayton
- Alpheus Cutler
- David Fullmer
- Benjamin F. Johnson
- John D. Lee (Scribe)
- Cornelius P. Lott
- William Marks
- Isaac Morley
- John E. Page
- W.W. Phelps
- Charles C. Rich

== Role of the Council in Joseph Smith's administration ==
While much of the rhetoric in Council of Fifty meetings focused on the council's millennial reign, in practice, the council performed two duties during its brief existence under Joseph Smith. First, it sought out territorial lands for Mormons to settle, primarily in Texas and Oregon territory. The council sent emissary and council member Lucien Woodworth to meet with Sam Houston and the Texas government, then an independent nation. The council also sent emissaries to Washington, D.C. to meet with members of Congress in the hopes of passing a resolution to allow Joseph Smith to be appointed General and march 100,000 volunteers to Oregon Territory.

The second duty of the Council was to assist in Joseph Smith's 1844 campaign for President of the United States. Smith ran on a platform among church members of bringing restitution for land and property lost in Missouri, eliminating slavery, compensating slave-owners with the sale of public lands, reducing the salaries of members of Congress, eliminating debt imprisonment, etc. Members of the Council campaigned throughout the United States. Besides sending out hundreds of political missionaries to campaign for Smith throughout the U.S., they also appointed fellow members of the Fifty as political ambassadors to Russia, the Republic of Texas, Washington D.C., England, and France. However, Smith was murdered by a large mob in the midst of his presidential campaign. The campaign was meant to draw greater attention to the plight of the Mormons, who had received no state or federal restitution for hundreds of thousands of dollars' worth of property lost to mob violence in relation to the 1838 Mormon War. However, the Nauvoo Expositor incident, Smith's Presidential campaign, and even hyperbolic and inaccurate rumors about the Council of Fifty helped create the local unrest that led to his assassination.

== Role of the Council in the Utah Territory and state of Utah ==
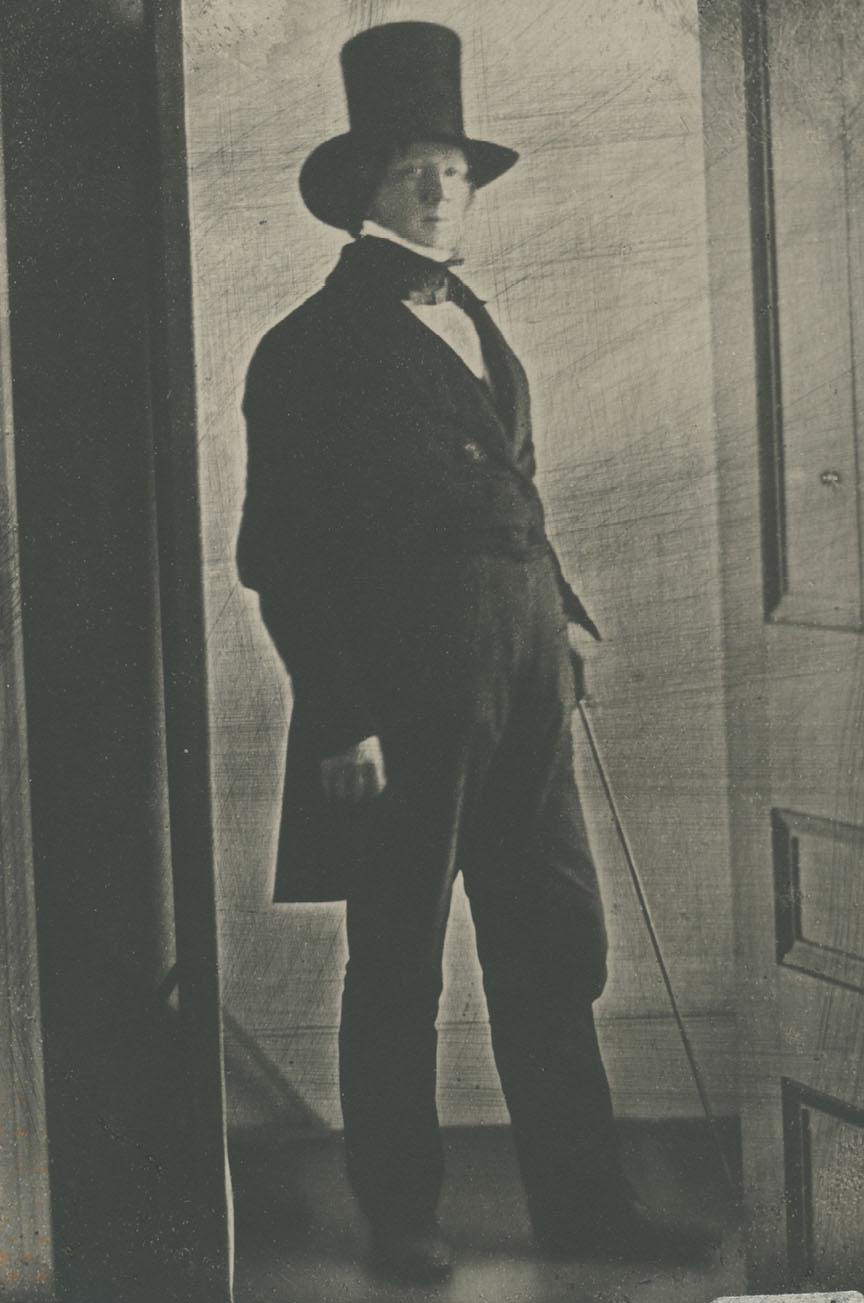
Brigham Young (daguerreotype circa 1846)

After Smith's death, the Council anointed Brigham Young its leader, and as the "king and president" of the Kingdom of God. Under Young, the council helped organize the trek west from Nauvoo in 1846, and it largely governed the unorganized territory of Utah until Congress granted territorial status in 1850.

The Council assisted in the Mormon Exodus from Nauvoo, Illinois and the eventual migration to the Great Basin area of what is now Utah. Young relied upon the results of scouting missions by members of the Council in choosing the Great Basin as a destination for their exodus from Nauvoo, over several alternate possibilities including Texas, California, Oregon, and Vancouver Island.

The council was to act as a legislative body in the Kingdom of God, and in Utah, the Council became a provisional legislative body in the government. This continued until September 1850 when Congress organized the Utah Territory upon petition by the church. After Utah became a territory, the American expectation for a separation between church and state sharply diminished the Council's official role in government. The Council then suspended meetings in October 1851. The council met again only briefly in 1867 and 1868 and voted for the establishment of Zion's Co-operative Mercantile Institution (ZCMI).

The Council resurfaced during the administration of John Taylor, to combat federal involvement in overseeing Utah elections. The Council's last recorded meeting was in 1884.

== Publication of minutes ==
In 2013, the First Presidency of the LDS Church approved the publication of the minutes of the Council of Fifty as one of the upcoming volumes of the ongoing Joseph Smith Papers project. The minutes were published in September 2016.

== See also ==
- Anointed Quorum
- Confederate Nations of Israel: a Mormon fundamentalist organization founded in 1977 and patterned after the Council of Fifty
- List of members of the Council of Fifty
