= Life of Joseph Smith =

After growing up in New York, Joseph Smith founded a church and moved to Kirtland, Ohio. Facing bank fraud charges, he fled to Far West, Missouri. Jailed for treason against Missouri, Smith escaped to Illinois and founded the city of Nauvoo.

The life of Joseph Smith began in Sharon, Vermont in 1805, and ended in 1844 with a violent death by gunshot in the jail in Carthage, Illinois. In that time, Smith founded a religion, published religious texts, built a movement, and engendered controversy.

After Joseph Smith's birth, he moved with his family to the western region of New York State, following a series of crop failures in 1816. Living in an area of intense religious revivalism during the Second Great Awakening, Smith reported experiencing a series of visions. The first of these was in 1820, when he saw "two personages" (whom he eventually described as God the Father and Jesus Christ). In 1823, he said he was visited by an angel who directed him to a buried book of golden plates inscribed with a Judeo-Christian history of an ancient American civilization. In 1830, Smith published the Book of Mormon, which he described as an English translation of those plates. The same year he organized the Church of Christ, calling it a restoration of the early Christian Church. Members of the church were later called "Latter Day Saints" or "Mormons".

In 1831, Smith and his followers moved west, planning to build a communal Zion in the American heartland. They first gathered in Kirtland, Ohio, and established an outpost in Independence, Missouri, which was intended to be Zion's "center place". During the 1830s, Smith sent out missionaries, published revelations, and supervised construction of the Kirtland Temple. Because of the collapse of the church-sponsored Kirtland Safety Society, violent skirmishes with non-Mormon Missourians, and the Mormon extermination order, Smith and his followers established a new settlement at Nauvoo, Illinois, of which he was the spiritual and political leader. In 1844, when the Nauvoo Expositor criticized Smith's power and his practice of polygamy, Smith and the Nauvoo City Council ordered the destruction of its printing press, inflaming anti-Mormon sentiment. Fearing an invasion of Nauvoo, Smith rode to Carthage, Illinois, to stand trial, but was killed when a mob stormed the jailhouse.

== Early years (1805–1827) ==
Joseph Smith was born on December 23, 1805, in Vermont to Joseph Smith Sr. and Lucy Mack Smith. One of eleven children, Smith was a descendent of the influential colonial minister John Lothropp (1584–1653). Joseph's maternal grandfather, Solomon Mack (1732 – 1820), self-published a memoir about his own conversion experience.

Smith's childhood was marked by hardship. Joseph Sr.'s drunkenness was a source of embarrassment. When seven-year-old Joseph Jr. underwent painful surgery for a leg bone infection, the boy refused alcohol. He used crutches for three years and walked with a slight limp thereafter. After Joseph Sr. fell for a ginseng swindle followed by years of crop failures, the Smiths lost the family farm and were forced to travel 300 miles (480 km) west to frontier Western New York, where they took out a mortgage on a small farm.

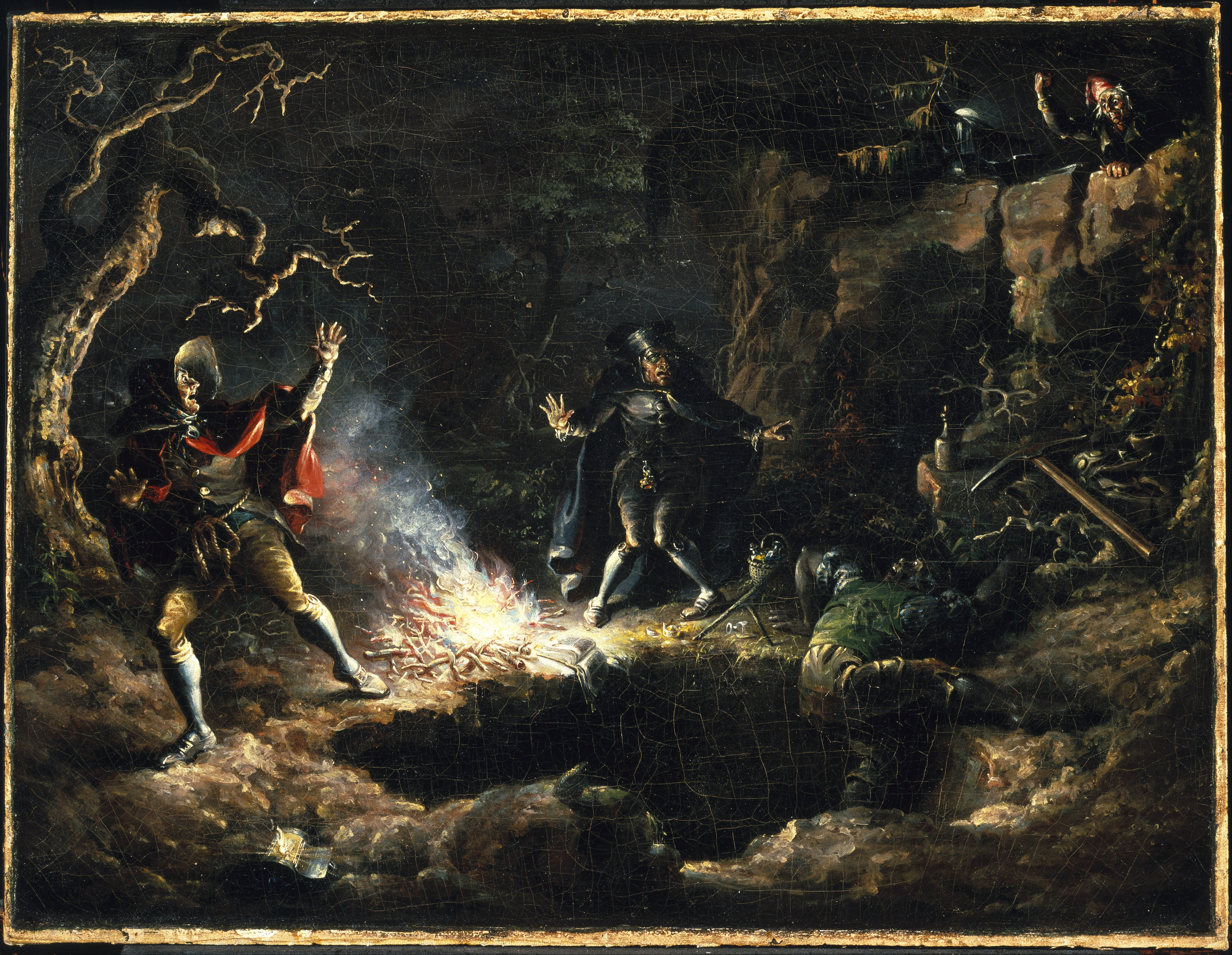
Night-time treasure digs were a common practice in New England, as shown in "The Money Diggers" (1832) by artist John Quidor.

The Smiths engaged in folk magic, a relatively common practice in that time and place. Joseph, his father, and his older brother Alvin hunted for treasure under the direction of a seer named Luman Walters. Before Walters left professing he lacked sufficient power, he singled out young Joseph Smith as the young man who might be able to find the treasure. After Walters left, the Smiths continued using folk magic and a seer stone to look for buried treasure.

Joseph, his family, and his acquaintances consistently listed September 21, 1823, the equinox, as a pivotal night in his life; the next day, he told his father that he had been visited in the night by a supernatural being who revealed the location of a nearby treasure. The Smith family believed in prophetic dreams or visions; both parents and his maternal grandfather had previously reported such dreams.

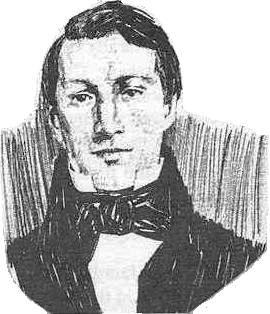
Joseph's older brother Alvin died in 1823.

Just weeks later, Alvin complained of stomach pains and called for a doctor who treated him with mercury salts. The substance lodged in Alvin's digestive system, and multiple other doctors were helpless to dislodge it. Alvin, only 25, died from mercury poisoning due to medical error. Joseph Sr. and Jr.'s trust in authorities was further shaken when the Presbyterian minister presiding over the funeral suggested Alvin had gone to hell. The family became divided by faith: Joseph and his father refused to join the church, while Joseph's mother and siblings joined.

One year after Joseph's dream, the Smiths reportedly attempted and failed to obtain the treasure. On September 29, 1824, Joseph Sr. published a notice in the paper announcing that he had briefly disinterred Alvin's body to confirm it had not been removed. Rumors spread that the Smiths had exhumed Alvin's body for use in magical treasure-seeking.

In the wake of Alvin's death, the family faced further financial hardships and worked odd jobs. Smith and his father achieved a reputation as treasure seers for hire. In 1825, Joseph's friend Josiah Jr. told his father Josiah Stowell about the two Smiths, and Josiah Sr. hired them to locate for a lost mine he believed might be on his property in Pennsylvania. While boarding in Pennsylvania, Smith met Emma Hale, his future wife. After about a month in Pennsylvania, the company disbanded and Smith returned to Chenango, New York where he worked for Stowell and his friend Joseph Knight Sr., along with making trips to court Emma Hale.

In New York, Smith directed further treasure digs for Knight and Stowell until March. That month, Josiah Stowell's nephew Peter Bridgeman filed a complaint against Joseph Smith, alleging he was taking advantage of the elder Stowell by engaging in "glass-looking", or using fortune-telling to attempt to find treasure. Smith was arrested and taken to trial, where Josiah Stowell testified that he believed Smith had the ability to find treasures by use of a seer stone. While the precise result of the proceeding remains unclear, Smith was freed and returned home to Palmyra.

Smith and Emma eloped and married on January 18, 1827, over the objections of her father Isaac Hale who regarded Smith as a charlatan. The couple began boarding with Smith's parents in Manchester, but after Smith promised to abandon treasure seeking, Hale offered to let the couple live on his property in Harmony and help Smith get started in business.

Josiah Stowell and Joseph Knight, Smith's patrons, travelled to Palmyra for the anticipated recovery of the treasure on September 22, 1827. Smith, with Emma, left home that night, returning with a report that treasures had been recovered, but that he had hidden them inside a hollow log for safekeeping. Days later, he returned home with a set of plates which could be hefted but not viewed. Smith explained he had been commanded not to show the plates to anyone else.

Upon hearing Smith had obtained a treasure, Smith's former treasure-seeking partners believed he had double crossed them and kept all the treasure to himself. After they ransacked places where they believed the plates might have been hidden, Smith decided to leave Palmyra.

== Writing a book and founding a church (1827–1830) ==
In October 1827, Smith and Emma permanently moved to Pennsylvania, funded by a relatively prosperous neighbor, Martin Harris in exchange for a share in Smith's upcoming book. There, Smith began dictating a text to wife Emma until April 1828, when Martin Harris took over dictation.

The process broke down after Smith allowed Harris to take possession of the only copy of the first 116 pages of manuscript, which were subsequently lost. Smith ended the dictation process, explaining that an angel had taken away the plates as punishment for having lost the manuscript pages.

On June 15, Emma and Joseph's first child, a son, was born but died the same day. Joseph joined his wife's church, the Methodists, becoming an "exhorter" for the group. He continued as a Methodist until one of his wife's cousins objected to inclusion of a "practicing necromancer" on the Methodist class roll, and Smith left the group.

Smith's first revelation, which he and followers interpreted as a direct communication from God, announced that the material covered in the lost pages, which had been translated from the plates of Lehi, would be replaced by new translation drawn from the plates of Nephi. Smith resumed dictation of the book to Emma in September 1828, In April 1829, he was joined by Oliver Cowdery, a distant cousin from Vermont who had also dabbled in folk magic. The two worked on the manuscript, later moving into the home of Cowdery's friend Peter Whitmer, where they completed it.

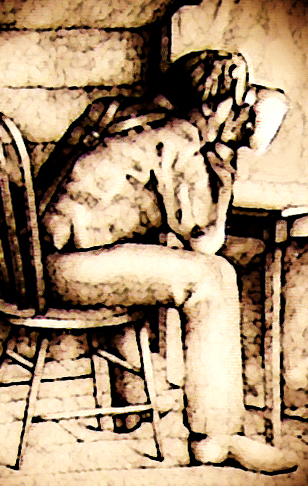
Smith dictated most of the Book of Mormon by looking into a seer stone placed in a stovepipe hat.

Smith dictated by using the same chocolate-colored seer stone he had used previously for treasure hunting placed in a hat. (Note: Quinn (1998, pp. 171–73)) Dictation was completed about July 1, 1829. The completed work, titled the Book of Mormon, was published in Palmyra and first advertised for sale on March 26, 1830.

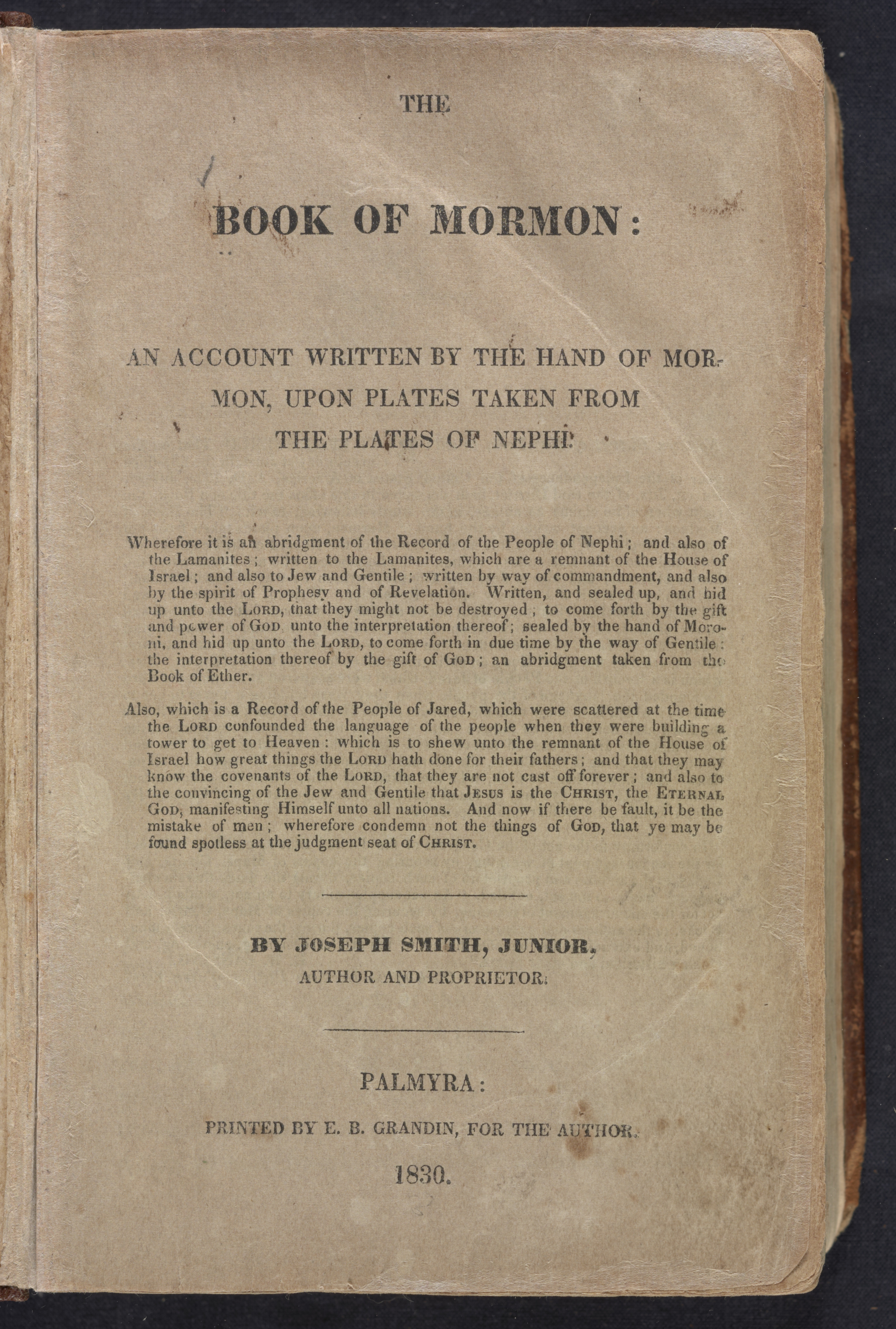
Cover page of the Book of Mormon, original 1830 edition

Less than two weeks later, on April 6, 1830, Smith and his followers formally organized the Church of Christ, and small branches were established in Manchester, Fayette, and Colesville, New York. As in 1826, he was arrested and charged with being a "disorderly person". Although he was acquitted, he was again arrested, this time transported to Broome County, where he was again acquitted by a three-judge panel. He and Cowdery fled to escape a gathering mob.

Cowdery, Peter Whitmer, and others traveled west on mission to proselytize to the Native Americans.

== Success and schism in Ohio (1831–1838) ==
Church co-founder Oliver Cowdery and others left New York for Ohio. There they encountered the hugely-popular Campbellite minister Sidney Rigdon. Rigdon, who had long preached a Restoration of the true church, converted to the new movement, bringing along over a hundred followers. Rigdon's conversion dramatically swelled the ranks of the new organization. Rigdon visited New York, where he had extensive personal conversations with Smith. With growing opposition in New York, Smith announced a revelation that his followers should gather at Kirtland, Ohio.

Smith moved to Kirtland in January 1831. There, many of Rigdon's followers practiced Christian communism by sharing "From each according to his ability, to each according to his needs". In 1831, Smith began to privately teach the practice of polygamy, according to a variety of sources including apostles Brigham Young, Orson Pratt, and Lyman E. Johnson. Levi Lewis, Emma's cousin who had known Smith and Harris in Harmony, accused Smith of trying to seduce local girl Eliza Winters. According to Lewis, he had heard both Smith and Harris say that "adultery is no crime". That year, Smith told twelve-year old Mary Rollins that God had commanded him to take her as a wife; she would later be recognized by the church as one of Smith's plural wives in February 1842 at the age of 23.

The John Johnson family was baptized into Smith's church, including fifteen-year-old Marinda Johnson. For seven months, Smith and Rigdon lived at the Johnson farm. On March 24, 1832, a mob dragged Smith and Rigdon from their beds, beat them badly, and then tarred and feathered them. Simonds Ryder, writing in the 1860s, argued the attack was precipitated by recent converts having learned their property was to be placed under the church's control, a motivation corroborated in by S.F. Whitney.

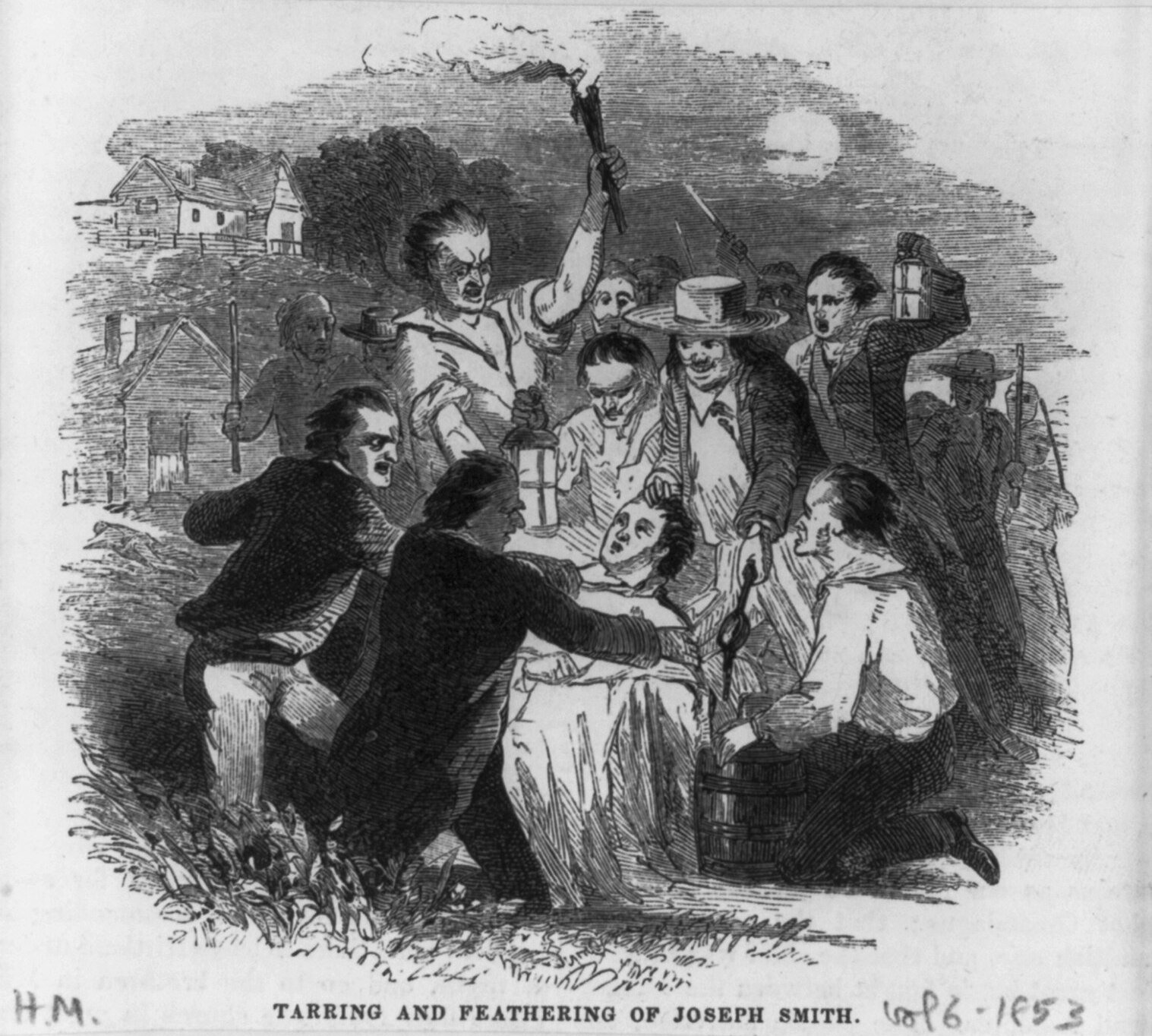
A mob tarred and feathered Smith and Rigdon on March 24, 1832. Smith was beaten, tied, stripped, scratched, burned, poisoned and almost castrated. His infant son died of measles soon thereafter, which the Smiths attributed to exposure to cold air during the attack.

Unlike Rigdon, Smith was tied to a board and stripped naked so a doctor could perform a castration. When the doctor refused to go through with the procedure, the mob tried to force poison down Smith's throat, chipping a tooth in the process. Despite the attack, Smith preached to his congregation the following morning and performed baptisms. His infant adopted son Joseph Murdock died of measles, the fourth child the Smiths had lost; his family linked his death to him being exposed to the cold during the attack.

In the 1880s, minister Clark Braden repeated a rumor that claimed Smith practiced polygamy in Kirtland and was intimate with Marinda, a claim later popularized by Fawn Brodie in her psychobiography of Smith. Though the theory has largely been rejected by later scholarship, Mormon polygamy historian Todd Compton speculates on the timing of the 1832 attack: "The castration attempt might be taken as evidence that the mob felt that Joseph had committed a sexual impropriety... they had planned the operation in advance, as they brought along a doctor to perform it. The first revelations on polygamy had been received in 1831... Also, Joseph Smith did tend to marry women who had stayed at his house or in whose house he had stayed." In 1842, Marinda, age 26, became one of Smith's wives.

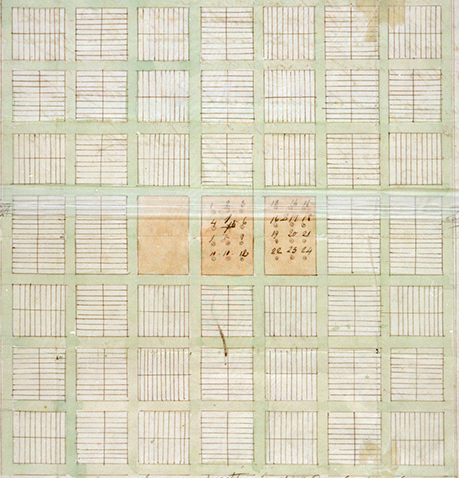
Joseph Smith drew up a comprehensive city plan for Zion (Independence), calling for 24 Mormon temples and a grid of streets along cardinal directions.

Converts poured into Kirtland. By the summer of 1835, there were fifteen hundred to two thousand members in the vicinity, many expecting Smith to lead them shortly to the Millennial kingdom.

In July 1831, Smith visited Independence, Jackson County, Missouri, and announced a revelation that the frontier hamlet was the "center place" of Zion. Smith visited Missouri again in early 1832 to prevent a rebellion of prominent church members who believed the church in Missouri was being neglected.

We are daily told, and not by the ignorant alone, but by all classes of them, that we...of this county are to be cut off, and our lands appropriated by them for inheritances.

— Address of Jackson County citizens

In Jackson County, existing Missouri residents resented the Latter Day Saint newcomers for both political and religious reasons. Additionally, their rapid growth aroused fears that they would soon constitute a majority in local elections, and thus "rule the county". Tension increased until July 1833, when non-Mormons forcibly evicted the Mormons and destroyed their property. Smith advised his followers to bear the violence patiently until after they had been attacked multiple times, after which they could fight back. Armed bands exchanged fire, killing one Mormon and two non-Mormons, until the old settlers forcibly expelled the Mormons from the county.

After petitions to the Missouri governor were unsuccessful, in May 1834 Smith organized and led a 200-man paramilitary expedition, called Zion's Camp, to aid church members in Jackson County, Missouri. As a military endeavor, the expedition was a failure. The men of the expedition were disorganized, a cholera outbreak killed 14, and they were severely outnumbered. By the end of June, Smith deescalated the confrontation, sought peace with Jackson County's residents, and disbanded Zion's Camp. Nevertheless, Zion's Camp transformed Latter Day Saint leadership because many future church leaders came from among the participants.

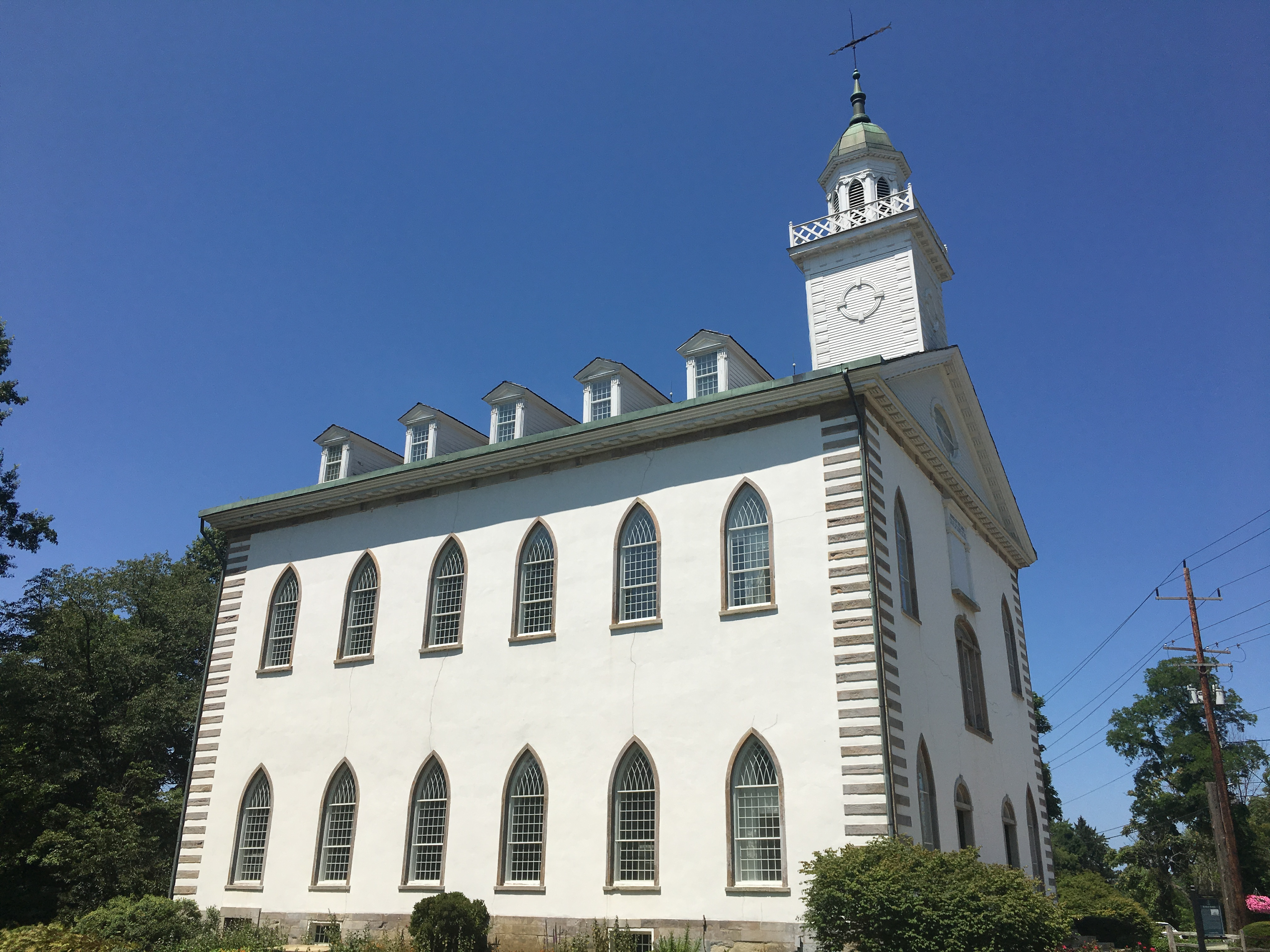
In 1836, Smith dedicated the House of the Lord in Kirtland, later known as Kirtland Temple.

After the Camp returned to Ohio, Smith drew heavily from its participants to establish various governing bodies in the church. He gave a revelation announcing that in order to redeem Zion, his followers would have to receive an endowment in the Kirtland Temple, which he and his followers constructed. In March 1836, at the temple's dedication, many who received the endowment reported seeing visions of angels and engaged in prophesying and speaking in tongues.

In 1836, Smith traveled to Salem, Massachusetts, to search for a trove of coins there. Smith announced a revelation that God had "much treasure in this city". After a month, he and his companions returned to Kirtland empty-handed.

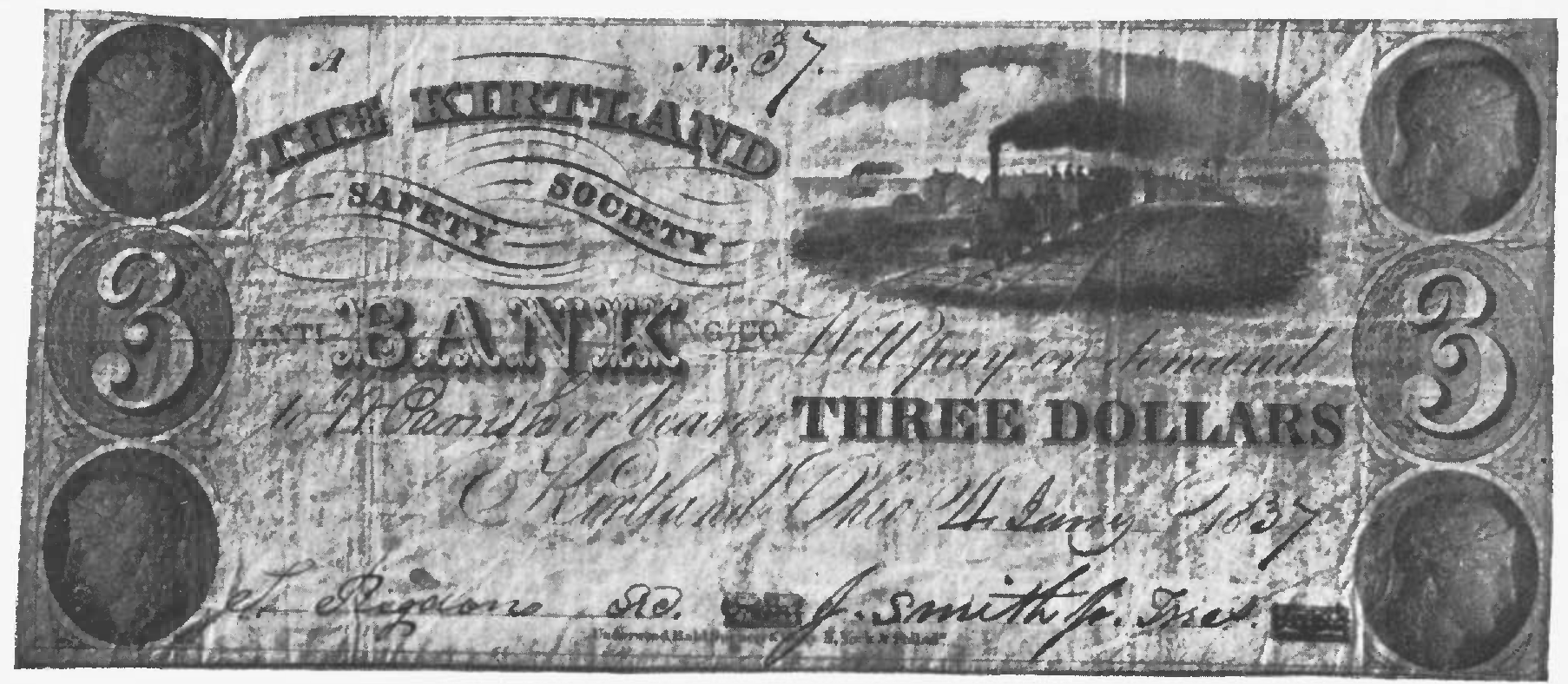
Note issued by the Kirtland Safety Society Anti-Banking Company

In 1837, a series of internal disputes led to the demise of the Kirtland community. In 1836, church apostle Orson Hyde was sent to the Ohio legislature to request a bank charter, while Oliver Cowdery went to Philadelphia and acquired plates to print notes for the proposed bank. On January 2, Hyde returned to Kirtland empty-handed, unable to persuade any legislator to sponsor a bill for a bank charter; Smith and other bank leaders proceeded with their plans, calling their organization an 'anti-banking society' and issuing bank notes. "Anti" and "ing" were engraved before and after "Bank"—in smaller typeface—on the printing plates Cowdery had previously purchased in Philadelphia. Smith encouraged his followers to buy the notes, in which he invested heavily himself. The bank failed within a month. Historian Robert Kent Fielding argues:

There was never the slightest chance that the Kirtland Safety Society anti-Bank-ing Company could succeed.... a gigantic company capitalized at four million dollars, when the entire capitalization of all the banks in the state of Ohio was only nine and one third million... Stock was to be paid in by subscription but that the amount of payments were left to the discretion of the company managers. Furthermore, total issuance of notes was not prescribed, nor was the relation of notes to capital and assets... To a banker, the articles fairly shouted: 'this is a wildcat, beware!'

As a result of the bank failure, Mormons in Kirtland suffered losses and intense pressure from debt collectors. Smith was held responsible for the failure, and there were widespread defections from the church, including many of Smith's closest advisers. Construction of the Kirtland Temple had only added to the church's debt, and Smith was hounded by creditors. Smith and Rigdon were charged with illegally operating a bank; both were found guilty and fined.

In June 1837, Smith was arrested on a charge that he had conspired to have critic Grandison Newell murdered. Solomon Denton and Orson Hyde testified for the prosecution. Smith was acquitted.

Also in 1837, Oliver Cowdery, who was then assistant president of the church, accused Smith of engaging in a sexual relationship with a teenage servant in his home, Fanny Alger. Smith, who was married to Emma at the time, said little of the relationship, but he did specifically deny being guilty of adultery. Indeed, contemporaries of Smith agree that he had likely married Alger as a polygamous wife. Cowdery was subject to excommunication proceedings for "seeking to destroy the character of President Joseph Smith, Jun., by falsely insinuating that he was guilty of adultery", but in 2014 the LDS church admitted Smith had had a marital relationship with Alger.

By 1838, Smith was facing widespread dissension from high-profile church leaders, accusing him of being a fallen prophet, as well as mounting lawsuits. That night, he and Sidney Rigdon fled Kirtland to join up with the Mormons in Far West, Missouri. Smith's critics in Kirtland took control of the temple, but many Kirtland Mormons eventually followed Smith to Missouri.

== Strife and war in Far West, Missouri (1838–39) ==
By 1838, Smith had abandoned plans to reclaim the city of Independence and instead declared the town of Far West as the new "Zion". In Missouri, the church also took the name "Church of Jesus Christ of Latter Day Saints", and construction began on a new temple. In the weeks and months after Smith and Rigdon arrived at Far West, thousands of Latter Day Saints followed them from Kirtland. Smith encouraged the settlement of land outside Caldwell County, instituting a settlement in Adam-ondi-Ahman, in Daviess County.

Since 1830, Smith's claims about the golden plates had been corroborated by statements from the Three Witnesses: Oliver Cowdery, Martin Harris, and David Whitmer. In December 1837, Harris was excommunicated after denouncing Joseph Smith as a financial fraudster over the bank scandal, while Whitmer and Cowdery were excommunicated for dissent in April 1838. In June 1838, a secret group called the Danites was formed to deal with dissenters who had split with Smith. A letter was addressed specifically to the principal dissenters: Oliver Cowdery, David Whitmer, John Whitmer, William Wines Phelps, and Lyman E. Johnson. The letter demanded the dissenters vacate the county, warning "depart, or a more fatal calamity shall befall you." The letter — later known as the "Danite Manifesto" — displayed the signatures of eighty-three Mormons, including that of Joseph Smith's brother, and fellow member of the First Presidency, Hyrum, but not Joseph or Rigdon. The letter had the desired effect, and the few named dissenters quickly fled the county. That July, Smith wrote in his diary that the Danites were a force to "put to right that which is not right, and to clense the Church of every great evil".

Beginning in 1838, Smith told followers that, as a teen, he had been visited by "two personages" that he identified as God and Jesus. According to his 1838 account, the young Smith asked the personages which church was correct and was told that all were wrong.

Political and religious differences between old Missourians and newly arriving Latter Day Saint settlers provoked tensions between the two groups, much as they had in Jackson County. By this time, Smith's experiences with mob violence led him to believe that his faith's survival required greater militancy against anti-Mormons. Tensions between the Mormons and the native Missourians escalated quickly until, on August 6, 1838, non-Mormons in Gallatin, Missouri, tried to prevent Mormons from voting, and a brawl ensued. The election day scuffles initiated the 1838 Mormon War. Non-Mormon vigilantes raided and burned Mormon farms, while Danites and other Mormons pillaged non-Mormon towns.

In the Battle of Crooked River, a group of Mormons attacked the Missouri state militia, mistaking them for anti-Mormon vigilantes. Governor Lilburn Boggs then ordered that the Mormons be "exterminated or driven from the state". On October 30, a party of Missourians surprised and killed seventeen Mormons in the Haun's Mill massacre.

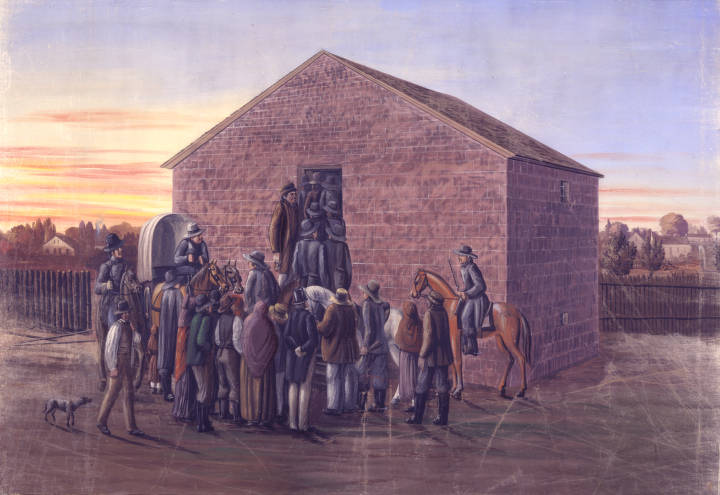
Smith was held for four months in Liberty jail.

The following day, the Mormons surrendered to 2,500 state troops and agreed to forfeit their property and leave the state. Smith was immediately brought before a military court, accused of treason, and sentenced to be executed the next morning, but Alexander Doniphan, who was Smith's former attorney and a brigadier general in the Missouri militia, refused to carry out the order. Smith was then sent to a state court for a preliminary hearing, where several of his former allies testified against him. Smith and five others, including Rigdon, were charged with treason, and transferred to the jail at Liberty, Missouri, to await trial.

During his imprisonment, Smith wrote a personal defense and an apology for the activities of his followers. Though he directed his followers to collect and publish their stories of persecution, he also urged them to moderate their antagonism toward non-Mormons. On April 6, 1839, after a grand jury hearing in Daviess County, Smith and his companions escaped custody, almost certainly with the connivance of the sheriff and guards.

== Rule in Nauvoo, Illinois (1839–1844) ==
Many American newspapers criticized Missouri for the Haun's Mill massacre and the state's expulsion of the Mormons. Illinois then accepted Mormon refugees who gathered along the banks of the Mississippi River, where Smith purchased high-priced, swampy woodland in the hamlet of Commerce. He attempted to portray the Mormons as an oppressed minority and unsuccessfully petitioned the federal government for help in obtaining reparations.

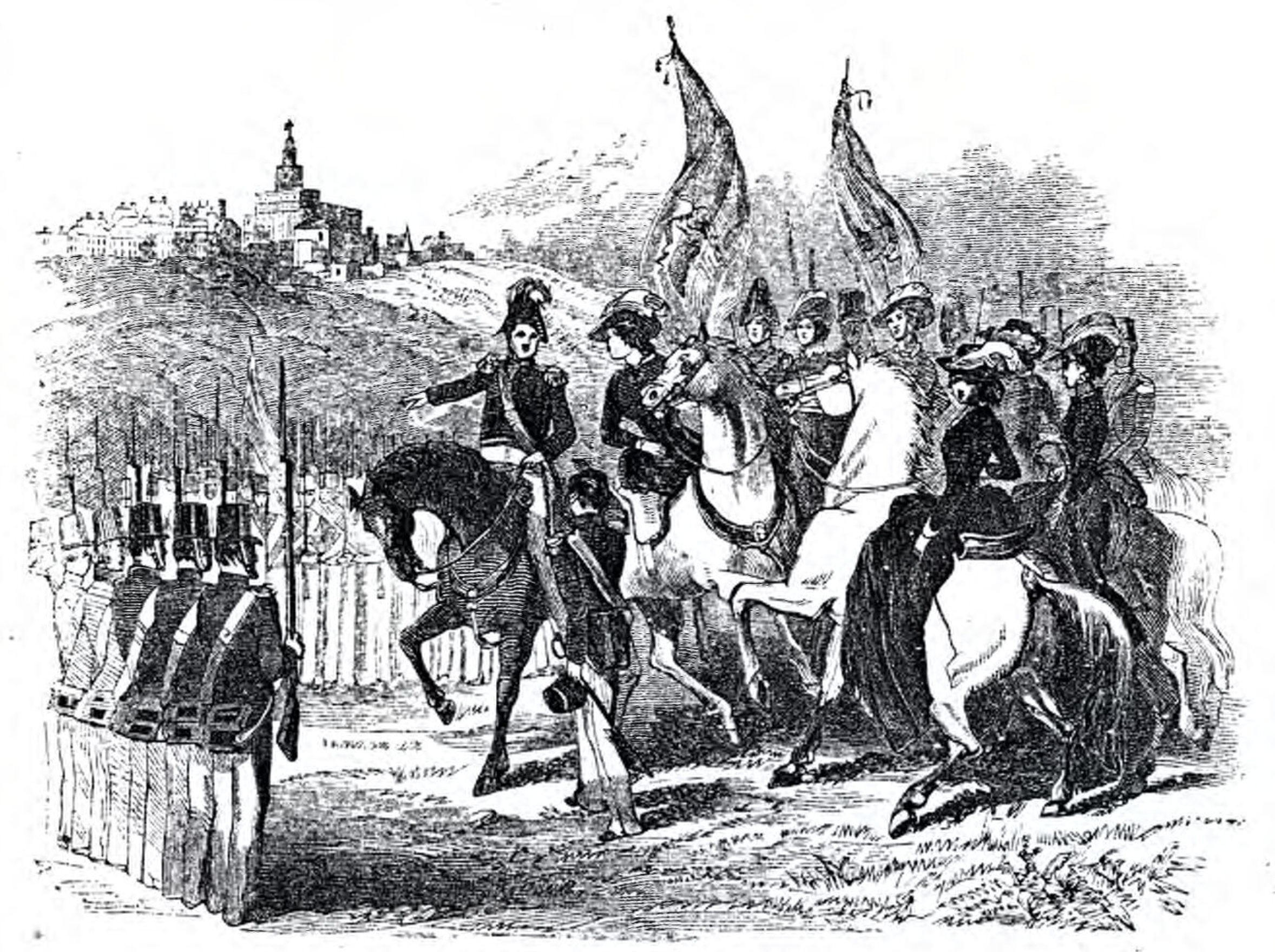
Smith inspecting the Nauvoo Legion

Smith also attracted a few wealthy and influential allies, including John C. Bennett, the Illinois quartermaster general. Bennett used his connections in the Illinois state legislature to obtain an unusually liberal charter for the new city, which Smith renamed "Nauvoo". The charter granted the city virtual autonomy, authorized a university, and granted Nauvoo habeas corpus power—which allowed Smith to fend off extradition to Missouri. Though Latter Day Saint authorities controlled Nauvoo's civil government, the city guaranteed religious freedom for its residents. The charter also authorized the Nauvoo Legion, a militia whose actions were limited only by state and federal constitutions. Bennett and Smith became its commanders, and were styled Major General and Lieutenant General respectively. As such, they controlled by far the largest body of armed men in Illinois. Smith appointed Bennett as Assistant President of the Church, and Bennett was elected Nauvoo's first mayor.

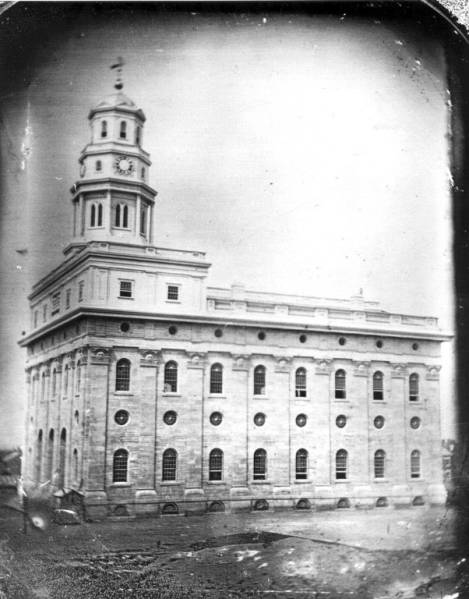
Smith planned the construction of the Nauvoo Temple, which was completed after his death.

The early Nauvoo years were a period of doctrinal innovation. Smith introduced baptism for the dead in 1840, and in 1841 construction began on the Nauvoo Temple as a place for recovering lost ancient knowledge. An 1841 revelation promised the restoration of the "fullness of the priesthood"; and in May 1842, Smith inaugurated a revised endowment or "first anointing". The endowment resembled the rites of Freemasonry that Smith had observed two months earlier when he had been initiated "at sight" into the Nauvoo Masonic lodge. At first, the endowment was open only to men, who were initiated into a special group called the Anointed Quorum. For women, Smith introduced the Relief Society, a service club and sorority within which Smith predicted women would receive "the keys of the kingdom". Smith also elaborated on his plan for a Millennial kingdom; no longer envisioning the building of Zion in Nauvoo, he viewed Zion as encompassing all of North and South America, with Mormon settlements being "stakes" of Zion's metaphorical tent. Zion also became less a refuge from an impending tribulation than a great building project. In the summer of 1842, Smith revealed a plan to establish the millennial Kingdom of God, which would eventually establish theocratic rule over the whole Earth.

In Nauvoo, Smith secretly practiced plural marriage. He introduced the doctrine to a few of his closest associates, including Bennett. When rumors of polygamy (called "spiritual wifery" by Bennett) got abroad, Smith forced Bennett's resignation as Nauvoo mayor. In retaliation, Bennett left Nauvoo and began publishing sensational accusations against Smith and his followers.

By mid-1842, popular opinion in Illinois had turned against the Mormons. After an unknown assailant shot and wounded former Missouri governor Lilburn Boggs in May 1842, anti-Mormons circulated rumors that Smith's bodyguard, Porter Rockwell, was the gunman. In July, the recently excommunicated John C. Bennett published a letter claiming Smith had admitted sending Rockwell to 'fulfill prophecy' by killing Boggs; Bennett's claims were widely viewed as an attempt at vengeance for his recent excommunication, with even Gov. Ford later writing that Bennett "everywhere accounted the same debauched, unprincipled and profligate character". Though the evidence was circumstantial, the new governor of Missouri petitioned Illinois for Smith's extradition, and Illinois Governor Carlin issued an arrest warrant. Certain he would be killed if he ever returned to Missouri, Smith went into hiding twice during the next five months, until the U.S. Attorney for Illinois argued that his extradition would be unconstitutional. Rockwell was later freed after a Missouri grand jury declined to indict him for the shooting.

In May 1843, Smith married Helen Mar Kimball, age 14, the daughter of apostle Heber C. Kimball, who himself had two wives at that time and had encouraged his daughter to accept the marriage.

In June 1843, Illinois Governor Thomas Ford issued a warrant to extradite Smith to Missouri on the outstanding charge of treason. Two law officers arrested Smith but were intercepted by a party of Mormons before they could reach Missouri. Smith was then released on a writ of habeas corpus from the Nauvoo municipal court. The events caused significant political fallout in Illinois.

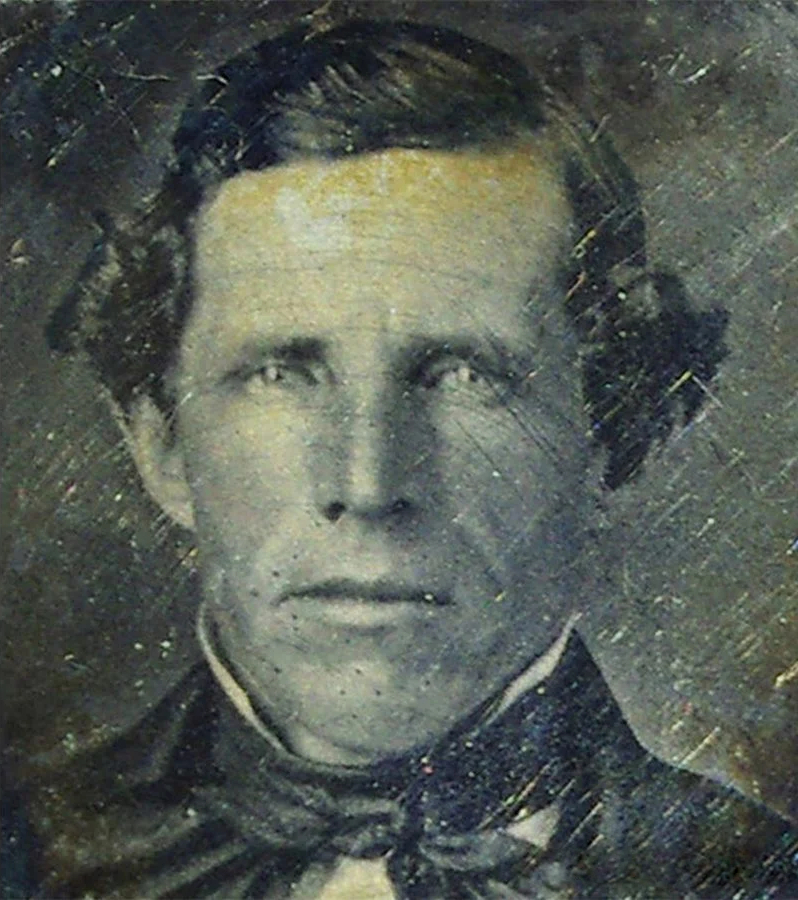
According to researchers Ronald Romig and Lachlan Mackay, Smith posed for a daguerreotype by Lucian R. Foster sometime in 1844; the photograph was published in 2022 in the John Whitmer Historical Association Journal.

On July 12, 1843, Joseph Smith dictated a revelation about polygamy; Hyrum read the revelation to the High Council on August 12, dividing the hierarchy into polygamist and anti-polygamist factions. On August 1, Smith assaulted County assessor Walter Bagby; Smith pleaded guilty, a fine was imposed, and it was paid. In September, Smith was charged with assault and battery against a Warsaw resident by the name of Bennett [not John C. Bennett]; arriving in Nauvoo with a warrant for Smith's arrest, Constable James Charles was informed that Smith had been tried and acquitted by the Nauvoo municipal court.

On November 5, Smith became ill and suspected he had been poisoned, perhaps by wife Emma. In December 1843, Smith petitioned Congress to make Nauvoo an independent territory with the right to call out federal troops in its defense. Smith then wrote to the leading presidential candidates, asking what they would do to protect the Mormons. After receiving noncommittal or negative responses, he announced his own independent candidacy for president of the United States, suspended regular proselytizing, and sent out the Quorum of the Twelve and hundreds of other political missionaries. Smith launched a presidential campaign in 1844 on a platform which proposed gradually ending slavery, protecting the liberties of Latter Day Saints and other minorities, reducing the size of Congress, reestablishing a national bank, reforming prisons, and annexing Texas, California, and Oregon.

== Arrest and death at hands of a mob ==
By early 1844, a rift developed between Smith and a half dozen of his closest associates. Robert D. Foster, a physician and general in the Nauvoo Legion, returned home to find Smith with his wife Sarah; She later confessed that Smith had preached polygamy and attempted to seduce her. After Joseph Smith made similar proposals to William Law's wife Jane, Law threatened to expose Smith unless he went before the High Council to confess and repent. On January 8, 1844, Smith removed Law from the First Presidency.

In March 1844, Smith secretly organized the Council of Fifty and tasked it with deciding which national or state laws Mormons should obey, establishing its own government, and finding a site where Mormons could live under theocratic law beyond the control of other governments—perhaps in Texas, Oregon, or Mexican-controlled California. On March 9, Smith preached a sermon on the plurality of gods—a doctrine the dissenters regarded as polytheistic blasphemy. On April 18, the Council unanimously elected Smith as "Prophet, Priest, and King".

"What a thing it is for a man to be accused of committing adultery, and having seven wives, when I can only find one. I am the same man, and as innocent as I was fourteen years ago; and I can prove them all perjurers."

— Joseph Smith
May 26, 1844.

Also on April 18, Smith excommunicated the dissenters from the church, alleging they were plotting to kill him. In response, Law and others formed the True Church of Jesus Christ of Latter Day Saints, which taught Smith was once a true prophet but had since fallen into sin. On May 23, Law and Foster testified before the grand jury in Carthage, which issued indictments against Smith for "adultery, fornication, and perjury". On May 26, Smith responded with another public denial.

On June 7, the dissidents published the first issue of the Nauvoo Expositor, a four-page tract which "exposed" Smith's secret practice of polygamy and his intention to establish a theocracy. The paper similarly decried Smith's recent doctrines of many Gods". Arguing the Expositor would provoke a new round of violence against the Mormons, the Nauvoo City Council declared the newspaper a public nuisance, and Smith ordered the Nauvoo Legion to assist the police force in destroying its printing press. During the council debate, Smith vigorously urged the council to order the press destroyed, not realizing that destroying a newspaper was more likely to incite an attack than any of the newspaper's accusations. On June 11, a warrant was issued for Smith's arrest on the charge of inciting a riot resulting in the destruction of the Expositor. Destruction of the newspaper provoked a strident call to arms from Thomas C. Sharp, editor of the Warsaw Signal and longtime critic of Smith.

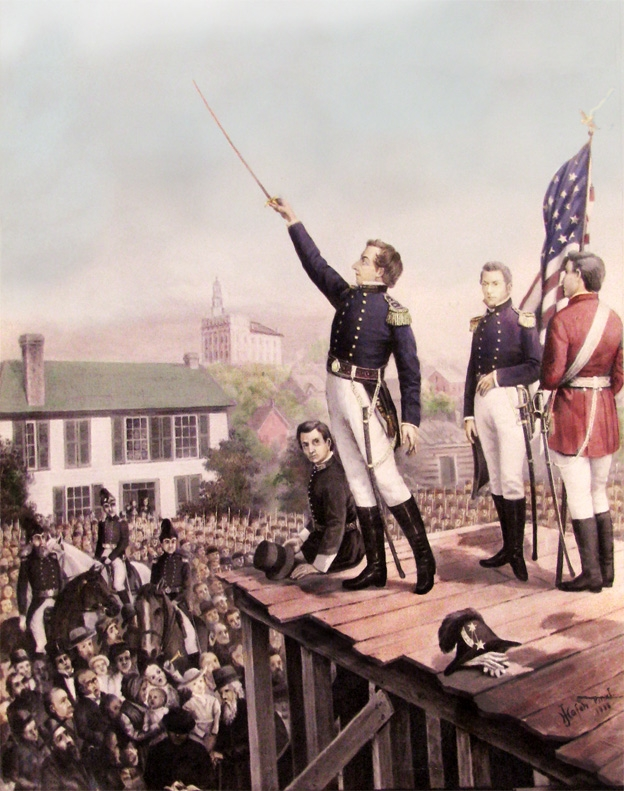
Lt. General Joseph Smith's last public address was on June 18, to the Nauvoo Legion.

On June 12, Constable David Bettisworth arrived in Nauvoo to place Joseph Smith under arrest and convey him to Carthage, but Smith was again freed by the municipal court. Bettisworth left but promised to return. Fearing further arrest attempts and mob violence, Smith mobilized the Nauvoo Legion on June 18 and declared martial law.

Officials in Carthage responded by mobilizing a small detachment of the state militia, and Governor Ford intervened, threatening to raise a larger militia unless Smith and the Nauvoo City Council surrendered themselves. Smith initially fled across the Mississippi River to avoid arrest, but shortly returned and surrendered to Ford after he was given assurances of his safety. On June 25, Smith and his brother Hyrum arrived in Carthage to stand trial for inciting a riot. Once the Smiths were in custody, the charges were increased to treason, preventing them from posting bail. John Taylor, Willard Richards, Dan Jones, John S. Fullmer, and Stephen Markham voluntarily joined the Smiths in the Carthage Jail. John S. Fullmer and Cyrus H. Wheelock visited the prisoners in jail, smuggling two pistols to Joseph in the process.

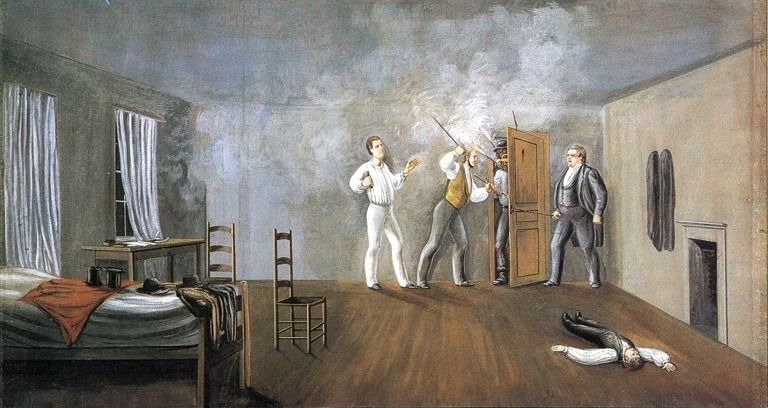
A 19th-century painting depicting the mob attack inside Carthage Jail

On June 27, 1844, Smith and the other prisoners were staying in the jailer's bedroom, which did not have bars on the windows. Although Smith both faced death threats and had a history of successful jailbreak, he and the other prisoners were left guarded by only six men. Upon learning that Smith was relatively unguarded, an armed mob with blackened faces stormed the jail. Smith, mistaking the mob for the Nauvoo Legion, initially told a jailer: "Don't trouble yourself ... they've come to rescue me." The guards reportedly feigned defense of the jail by firing shots or blanks over the attackers' heads, and some of the Greys even reportedly joined the mob, who rushed up the stairs. The mob first attempted to push the door open to fire into the room, though Smith and the other prisoners pushed back and prevented this.

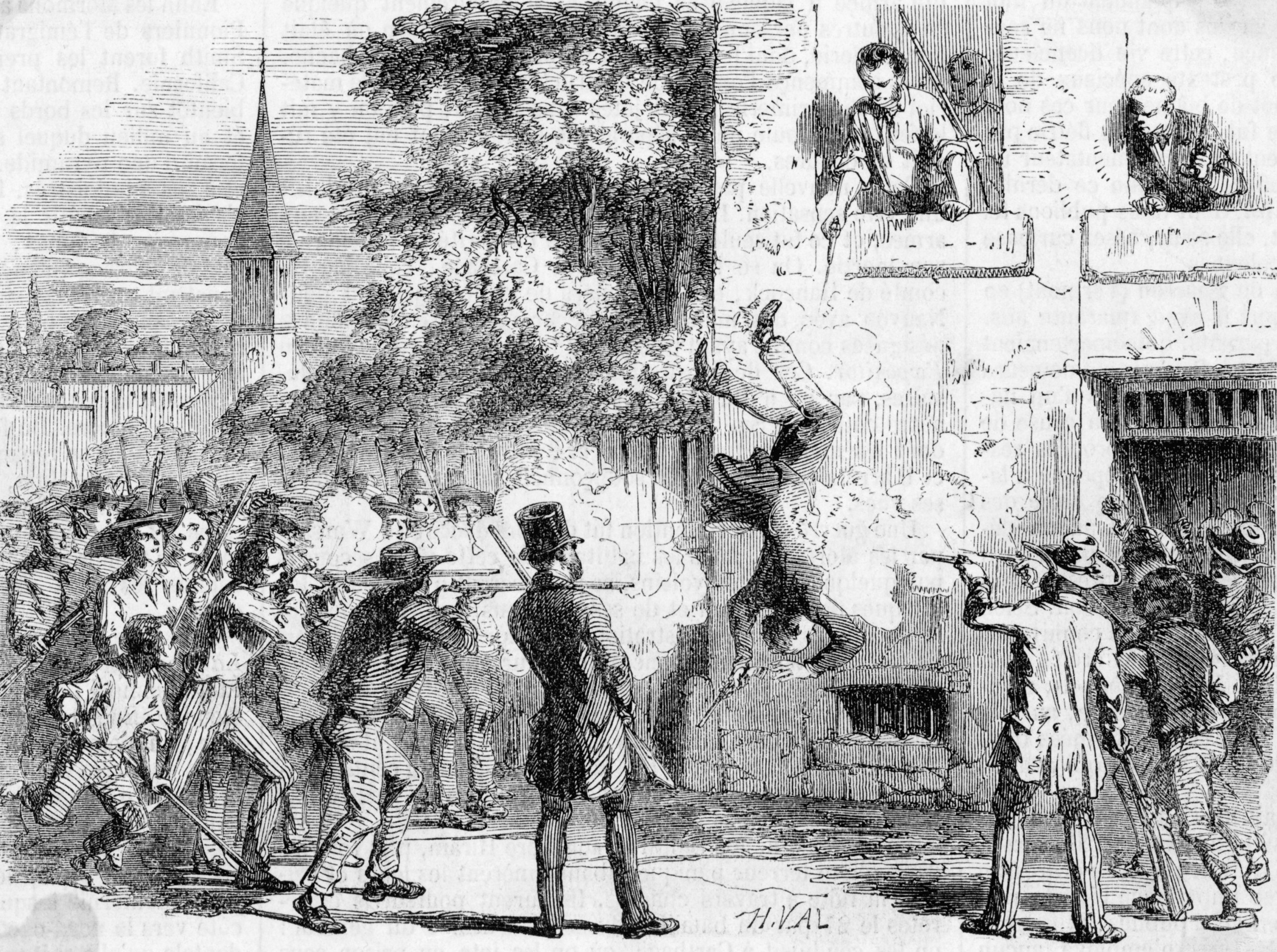
Smith was shot multiple times before and after falling from the window.

Hyrum, who was trying to secure the door, was killed instantly with a shot to the face. Smith fired three shots from the smuggled pepper-box pistol, wounding three men, before he sprang for the window. He was shot multiple times before falling out of the window, crying, "Oh Lord my God!" He died shortly after hitting the ground, but was shot several more times by an improvised firing squad before the mob dispersed. Smith was the first U.S. presidential candidate to be assassinated.

=== Immediate aftermath and burial ===
Immediately following Smith's death, non-Mormon newspapers were nearly unanimous in portraying Smith as a religious fanatic. Conversely, within the Latter Day Saint community, Smith was viewed as a martyred prophet.

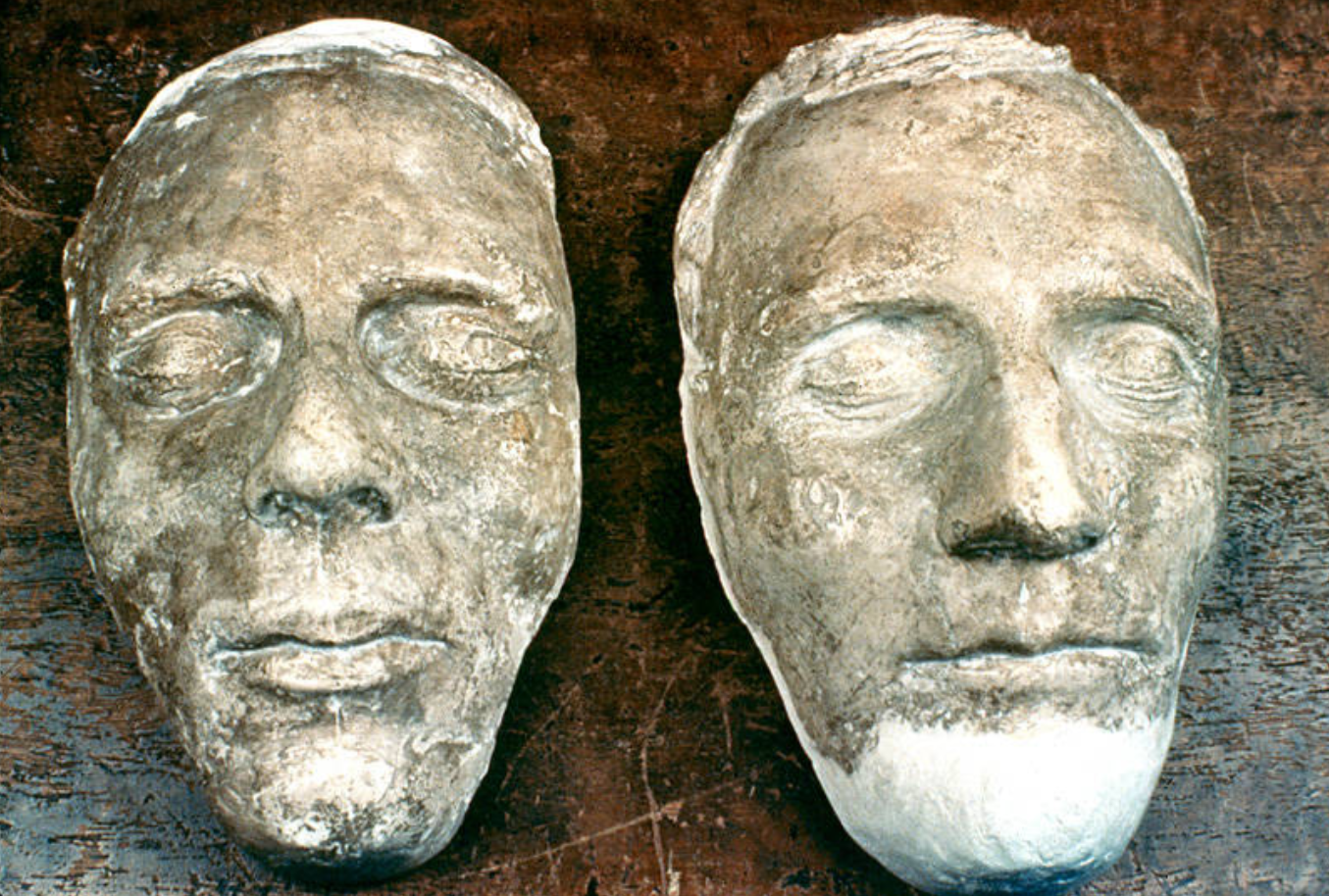
The death masks of Joseph Smith (left) and Hyrum Smith (right)

After a public funeral and viewing of the deceased brothers, Smith's widow—who feared hostile non-Mormons might try to desecrate the bodies—had their remains buried at night in a secret location, with substitute coffins filled with sandbags interred in the publicly attested grave. The bodies were later moved and reburied under an outbuilding on the Smith property off the Mississippi River. Members of the Reorganized Church of Jesus Christ of Latter Day Saints (RLDS Church), under the direction of then-RLDS Church president Frederick M. Smith (Smith's grandson), searched for, located, and disinterred the Smith brothers' remains in 1928 and reinterred them, along with Smith's wife, in Nauvoo at the Smith Family Cemetery.

== See also ==
- Criminal charges against Joseph Smith
- History of the Latter Day Saint movement
- Mormonism in the 19th century
- Outline of Joseph Smith
- Smith family (Latter Day Saints)
