= 1844 Mormon National Convention =

- 1844 presidential election

Convention
- Date(s): July 13, 1844
- City: Baltimore, Maryland

Candidates
- Presidential nominee: none
- Vice-presidential nominee: none

1844 Mormon National Convention was held July 12, 1844 in Baltimore, Maryland. A presidential nominating convention called for by the Mormon Church for the purposes of nationally nominating the presidential campaign of its founder Joseph Smith, it met without selecting a nominee due to Smith having been killed two weeks before the convention.

Prior to his death, Smith had been nominated in May 17 at a Illinois state convention in Nauvoo. Holding a national convention in Baltimore was hoped to generate a perception that the party was of similar importance as other national tickets that were holding their national conventions in Baltimore that year.

== Background ==
Mormonism founder Joseph Smith launched a campaign for president in the 1844 United States presidential election. The Quorum of the Twelve had voted to have Mormons nominate Smith for president. Smith, at the time, was mayor of Nauvoo, Illinois. An informal political caucus was held January 29, 1844, inside of the mayor's office in Nauvoo, featuring the Quorum of the Twelve and others, during which it was moved and voted, "we will have an independent electoral ticket, and that Joseph Smith be a candidate for the next Presidency; and that we use all honorable means in our power to secure his election". Smith published a campaign platform pamphlet that was first publicly read on February. His candidacy was reported upon by the Nauvoo Neighbor on February 14.

On March 11, a secret but official organization known as the "General Council" (also known as the "Council of Fifty") was formed, which appears to have thereafter become the main steering body for Smith's presidential campaign. At a meeting on April 9, the church's ecclesiastical leaders had called for state conventions to be held in all states both for the purposes of nominating Smith for state ballots and selecting electors for a later national convention.

On March 4, Smith had written in his journals of intending to have James Arlington Bennett serve as his vice presidential running mate on the ticket, but on March 8 Willard Richards informed Smith of his inaccurate belief that Bennett would not qualify to serve as vice president. That same day, Mormonism's First Presidency and the Twelve had Wilford Woodruff write to Solomon Copeland to ask him to be Smith's running mate. On March 21, the Council of Fifty approved of Woodruff's letter to Copeland inviting him to be Smith's running mate. Copeland declined. The Council of Fifty instead chose Sidney Rigdon on May 6 to be Smith's running mate.

== May 17 Illinois state nominating convention in Nauvoo ==
An Illinois state nominating convention was held May 17, 1844 in Nauvoo, Illinois, during which Smith was formally nominated for president and Sidney Rigdon was formally nominated for vice president. The convention also selected delegates to attend the ticket's national convention, to be held in Baltimore, Maryland. Nauvoo was the main center of Mormonism at the time. Few were in attendance at the convention from outside of Nauvoo and the immediate surrounding area of Hancock County, Illinois, which organizers blamed on "heavy rains" making travel from other counties "entirely impossible".

At the Illinois state convention, Smith was nominated for president, and a list of delegates (from various states) selected to serve at the upcoming national convention was announced. Despite a number of delegates named at there meeting being named to represent states besides Illinois at the convention, these were actually individuals that had relocated from other states Nauvoo.

Two of the speakers at the state convention were non-Mormon supporters of Smith.

Announced as delegates selected for national convention
Name	State	County
J. Hawae	Alabama	
Capt. Hathaway	Arkansas	
A. Johnson	Connecticut	Middlesex
E. M. Sanders	Delaware	
E. F. Sheets	Delaware	
Abraham Williams	Georgia	
A. Badlock	Illinois	Jo Daviess
S. Brown	Illinois	Brown
Johnathan Browning	Illinois	Adams
G. W. Goforth	Illinois	St. Clair
W. Green	Illinois	
W. B. Idle	Illinois	Sangamon
F. Merryweather	Illinois	
J. Myers. Esq.	Illinois	Adams
W. W. Phelps	Illinois	Hancock
Ebenezer Robinson	Illinois	
J. Sene	Illinois	Adams
Henry G. Sherwood	Illinois	
John Taylor	Illinois	
L. Wight	Illinois	Crawford
J. C. Wright	Illinois	Scott
Mr. Hunt	Indiana	Switzerland
D. J. Patton	Iowa	
J. Houston	Kentucky	Madison
Hosea Stout	Kentucky	Mercer
L. B. Lewis	Massachusetts	
Willard Richards	Massachusetts	Berkshire
Col. Cowan	Maine	Oxford
L. N. Scovil	Maryland	
Dr. Shenask	Michigan	
J. A. Mikesell	Missouri	
J. Harman	Mississippi	Monroe
Mr. Palman	Mississippi	
J. S. Swiss	New Hampshire	
E. Dougherty	New Jersey	Essex
J. Horner	New Jersey	Monmouth
Thomas Atkins	New Jersey	Burlington
W. Richardson	New Jersey	Burlington
J. M. Bernhisel	New York	
Mr. Dorlan	New York	Kings
L. R. Foster	New York	New York
Hugh Herinshaw	New York	Westchester
William Miller	New York	Livingston
S. A. Perry	New York	
E. Reece	New York	Erie
John Reid	New York	
E. Swakhammer	New York	New York
E. Thompson	New York	
Younger Maccauslin	North Carolina	Randolph
Dusten Arne	Ohio	
C. Brooks	Ohio	Lake
J. Coltrin	Ohio	Cuyahoga
W. W. Dryer	Ohio	Lorain
Thomas Martin	Ohio	Hamilton
W. G. Ware	Ohio	Hamilton
Edwin D. Woolley	Ohio	Columbiana
P. Bowen	Pennsylvania	Chester
E. Hunter	Pennsylvania	Chester
J. H. Newton	Pennsylvania	Philadelphia
W. Smith	Pennsylvania	Philadelphia
Dr. L. Richards	Rhode Island	Providence
Melvin Wilbur	Rhode Island	
Randolph Alexander	South Carolina	Union
M. Anderson	Tennessee	Rutherford
J. Hatch	Vermont	
J. Houston	Vermont	
W. Vanaudell	Virginia	

William G. Ware, listed as an Ohio delegate, had recently relocated from Ohio to Nauvoo at the time of the state convention and participated in the convention. In June, Ware (as a citizen of Nauvoo) signed a complaint against Smith and others over the riot that resulted in the destruction of the Nauvoo Expositor, contributing to Smith being tried in court.

== Other state conventions ==
A Massachusetts state convention was organized, held on July 1, by which time Smith had already been killed. At the Massachusetts state convention, Brigham Young appointed delegates to the Baltimore convention. Both the Massachusetts state convention and a state convention in Tennessee turned into riots. Ezra T. Benson and Norton Jacob reported on appointing delegates to attend state conventions in New Jersey and Michigan.

== National convention logistics ==
It was decided to hold the Mormon national convention in Baltimore, Maryland, because in 1844 that city was also to host the Democratic and Whig national conventions, and the meeting of the third-party "[John] Tyler Party". It was hoped that by staging a similar convention, the Mormons could produce the impression that their ticket was of similar importance to the leading political forces.

Two weeks prior to the convention, Smith was killed by a mob on June 27, while awaiting trial. Several delegates had already arrived in Baltimore in advance of the convention before word of Smith's death had yet to reach the city.

== National convention proceedings ==
The national convention convened as scheduled on July 13, in low spirits due to Smith's murder. It was decided that, in light of Smith's deaths, the convention should not nominated a ticket.

Without a candidate to nominate, the convention adjourned sine die without making a nomination.
