= James Arlington Bennet =

American journalist

James Arlington Bennet (December 21, 1788–December 25, 1863) was an attorney, newspaper publisher, educator and author.

Bennet was born in New York on December 21, 1788. Bennet was the proprietor of Arlington House, a Long Island educational institution. Bennet was appointed inspector-general of the Nauvoo Legion in April 1842, and was baptized into the Church of Jesus Christ of Latter Day Saints by Brigham Young on August 30, 1843. He was invited to be Joseph Smith's running mate in the presidential campaign of 1844, but the invitation was withdrawn due to a misunderstanding regarding Bennet's supposed birth in Ireland, which would have made him ineligible for the presidency under the Constitution's natural-born-citizen clause. Bennet died in Brooklyn, New York, on December 25, 1863.
