= Salaries of members of the United States Congress =

Salaries of US elected office-holders

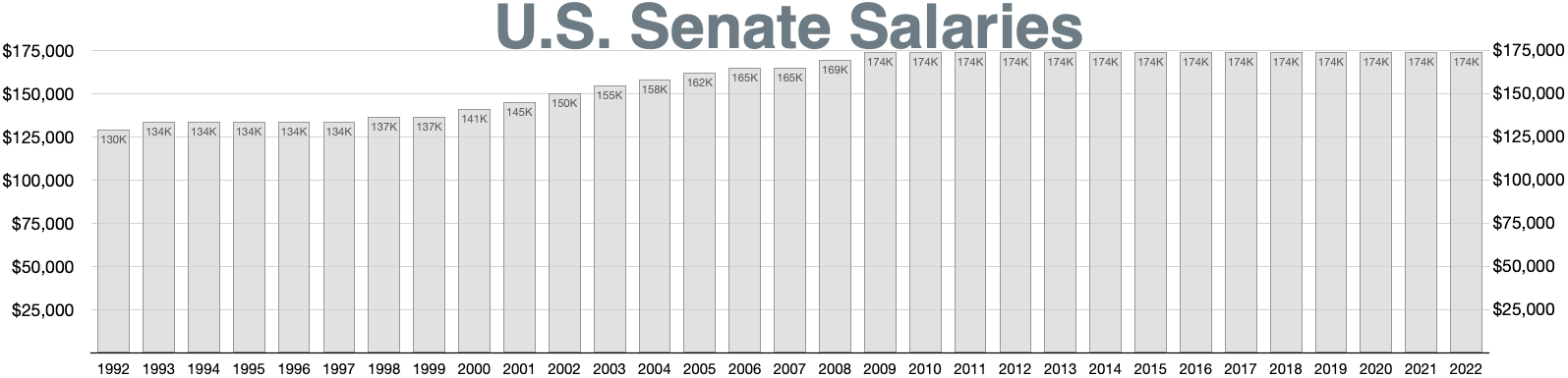
Senate salaries

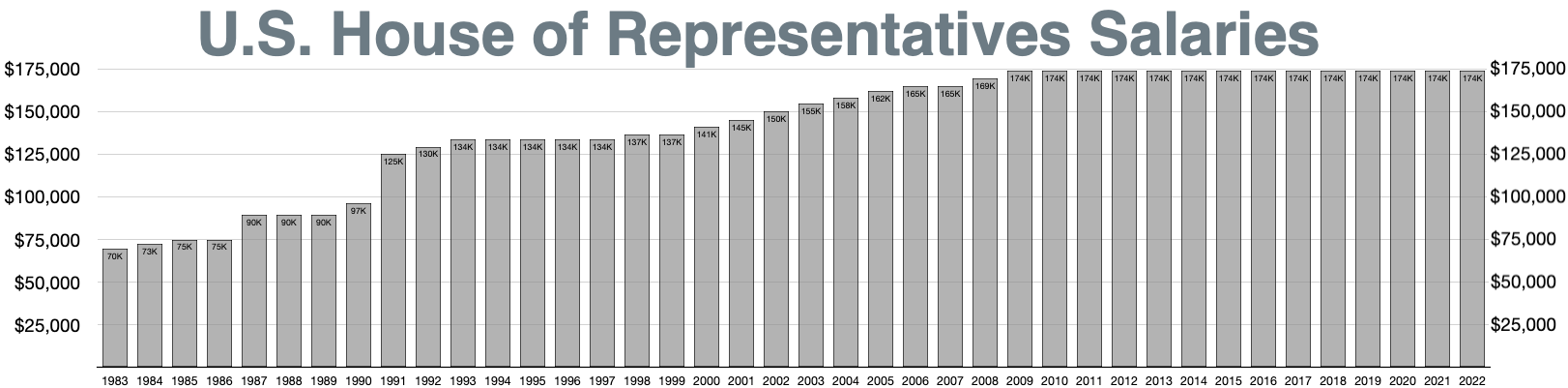
House of Representatives salaries

This chart shows historical information on the salaries that members of the United States Congress have been paid. The Government Ethics Reform Act of 1989 provides for an automatic increase in salary each year as a cost of living adjustment that reflects the employment cost index. Since 2010 Congress has annually voted not to accept the increase, keeping it at the same nominal amount since 2009. The Twenty-seventh Amendment to the United States Constitution, ratified in 1992, prohibits any law affecting compensation from taking effect until after the next election.

== For all members of the House of Representatives and Senate ==
Year	Salary	Per diem/annum	Auto COLA adj.	In 2023 dollars (when instituted)	In 2023 dollars (year prior to next increase)
1789	$6	per diem		$147	$118
1795	$7	per diem		$121	$228
1855	$3,000	per annum		$94,221	$56,132
1865	$5,000	per annum		$95,587	$115,711
1871	$7,500	per annum		$183,208	$183,208
1874	$5,000	per annum		$129,324	$162,852
1907	$7,500	per annum		$235,554	$128,068
1925	$10,000	per annum		$166,869	$192,429
1932	$9,000	per annum		$193,039	
1933	$8,500	per annum		$192,157	
1934 (2/1)	$9,000	per annum		$196,881	
1934 (7/1)	$9,500	per annum		$207,818	
1935	$10,000	per annum		$213,447	$150,068
1947	$12,500	per annum		$163,823	$136,214
1955	$22,500	per annum		$245,795	$212,302
1965	$30,000	per annum		$278,585	$252,459
1969	$42,500	per annum		$339,152	$252,190
1975	$44,600	per annum		$242,556	$229,364
1977	$57,500	per annum		$277,680	$257,987
1979	$60,652.50	per annum		$244,597	$195,266
1982	$69,800	per annum only Representatives		$211,662	
1983	$69,800	per annum only Senators		$205,086	
1984	$72,600	per annum		$204,499	
1985	$75,100	per annum		$204,341	$200,495
1987 (1/1)	$77,400	per annum		$199,372	
1987 (2/4)	$89,500	per annum		$230,540	$211,292
1990 (2/1)	$96,600	per annum only Representatives		$216,378	
1990 (2/1)	$98,400	per annum only Senators		$220,410	
1991 (1/1)	$125,100	per annum only Representatives		$268,783	
1991 (1/1)	$101,900	per annum only Senators		$218,937	
1991 (8/14)	$125,100	per annum only Senators		$268,783	
1992	$129,500	per annum	3.5%	$270,055	
1993	$133,600	per annum	3.2%	$270,647	$243,549
1998	$136,700	per annum	2.3%	$245,435	$240,140
2000	$141,300	per annum	3.4%	$240,114	
2001	$145,100	per annum	2.7%	$239,806	
2002	$150,000	per annum	3.4%	$244,052	
2003	$154,700	per annum	3.1%	$246,098	
2004	$158,100	per annum	2.2%	$244,949	
2005	$162,100	per annum	2.5%	$242,888	
2006	$165,200	per annum	1.9%	$239,810	$233,152
2008	$169,300	per annum	2.5%	$230,112	
2009	$174,000	per annum	2.8%	$237,344	$199,161
2020	$174,000	per annum	0	$196,754	$187,911
2022	$174,000	per annum	0	$174,000	
2023	$174,000	per annum			
2024	$174,000	per annum			
2025	$174,000	per annum			
2026 (present)	$174,000	per annum			

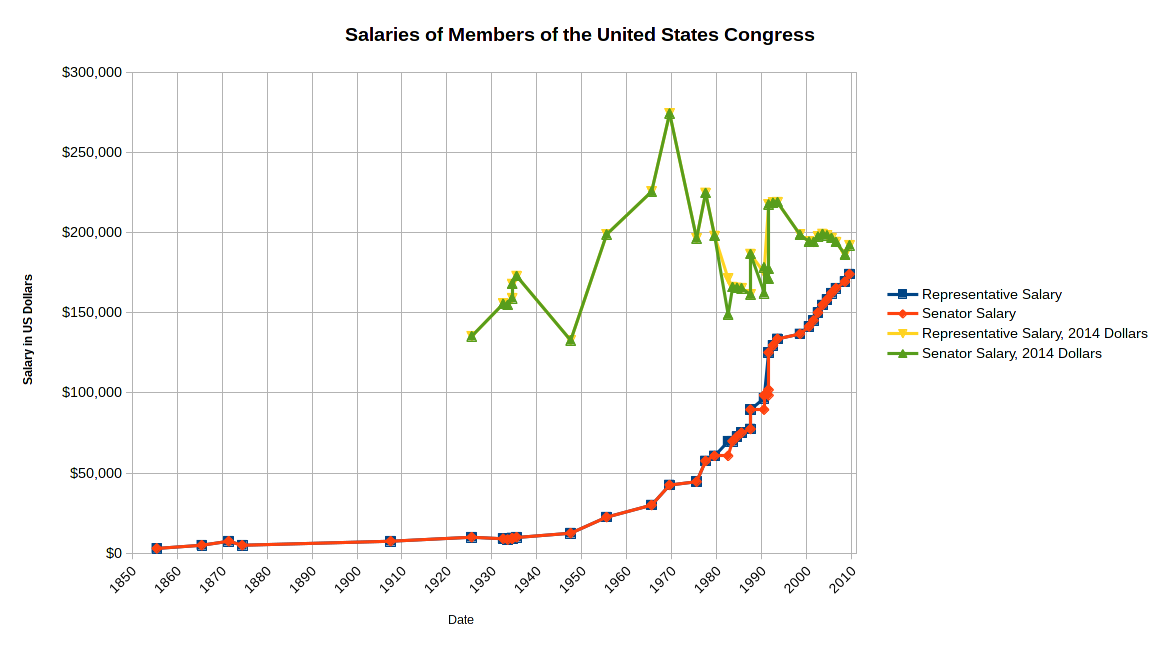
Salaries, shown for US Senators and US Representatives. Also shown: salaries adjusted to 2014 US Dollars.

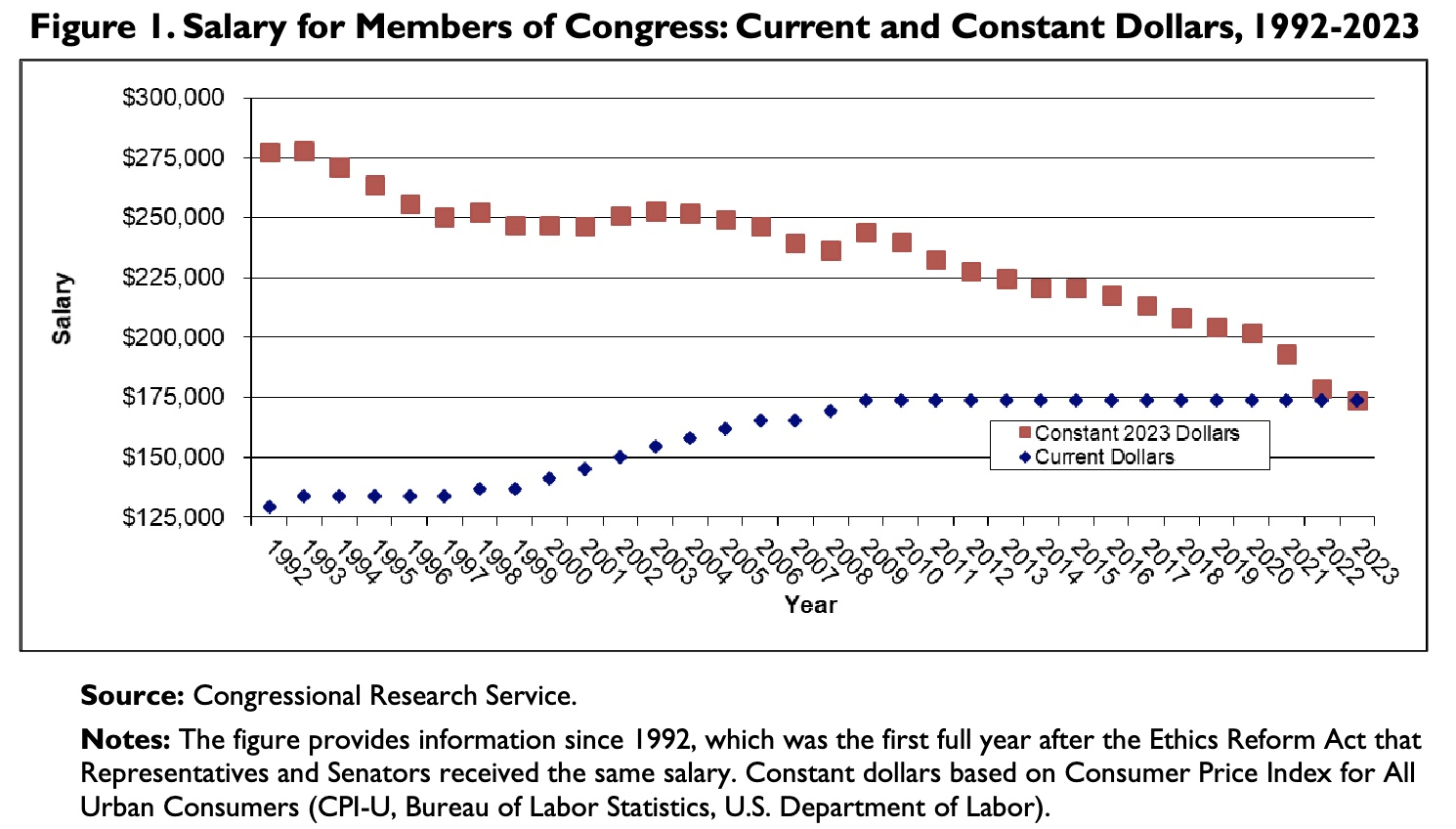
Graph of US Congressional Salaries 1992-2023 in actual and constant 2023 dollars

== Leadership and other positions ==
Additional pay schedule for the Senate and House positions:

Schedule 6—Vice President and Members of Congress, per Executive order 14113, effective for 2024.

Position	Salary
Vice President	$284,600
Senators and House Representatives	$174,000
Resident Commissioner from Puerto Rico	$174,000
President pro tempore of the Senate	$193,400
Majority leader and minority leader of the Senate	$193,400
Majority leader and minority leader of the House of Representatives	$193,400
Speaker of the House of Representatives	$223,500

== Debates over congressional salaries ==
Starting in the 19th century, there has been debate around raising congressional salaries, with views in Congress regularly split and not always across party lines.

When Congress members raise the topic of congressional salary increases, this is generally frowned upon by the public and seen as a form of corruption or self-dealing.

At the same time, arguments have been made that an increased salary for members of congress would accomplish: a) Making the position more accessible, especially for people from lower socioeconomic backgrounds; b) Making congress members more impervious to corruption, as a higher income would diminish the effectiveness of bribes from lobbyists and Political Action Committees (PACs). In turn, some proponents also argue that tools other than a salary cap are better positioned to reduce opportunities for self-dealing, such as: banning Congress members from becoming lobbyists after their terms are over, banning members of Congress from trading in individual stocks, and making the finances of those in public office completely transparent.

Many members of Congress continue to advocate for a salary raise as a simple, but effective solution. Notably, Rep. Alexandria Ocasio-Cortez called for this reform in 2021, and salary raises have been a part of Rep. Ro Khanna's plan for anti-corruption congressional reform.

== See also ==
- Salaries of Members of Congress: Congressional Votes, 1990-2023 (Report). Congressional Research Service. August 29, 2023. 97-615.
- Salaries of Members of Congress: Recent Actions and Historical Tables (Report). Congressional Research Service. August 29, 2023. 97-1011.
