= Solomon Copeland =

American farmer and business investor

Solomon Copeland (1799-184?) was a Tennessee farmer and business investor. He was elected surveyor of Henry County, Tennessee, in 1831 and 1839 and also served as Henry County estate administrator and court commissioner. Henry County voters elected Copeland, a Democrat, to represent them in the Tennessee General Assembly from 1841 to 1843.

Although not a member of the Latter Day Saint movement, Copeland was offered an opportunity to be Joseph Smith's running mate in his 1844 presidential campaign, but he declined. Copeland's connection to the Latter Day Saints came through his wife Sarah and two of the men he enslaved, Lewis and Robert.
