= Lucian R. Foster =

Lucian Rose Foster (12 November 1806 – 19 March 1876) was a photographer, accountant, bookkeeper, and clerk who was a member of the Latter Day Saint movement.

== Biography ==
Foster was born in New Marlboro, Massachusetts, to Nathaniel Foster and Polly. He joined the Church of Jesus Christ of Latter Day Saints by December 1840, and was appointed clerk of church conference on 4 December 1840. He also became a branch president in New York City from 1841 to 1844. He would later serve as member of the central correspondence committee for Joseph Smith's 1844 presidential campaign, and was also admitted to the Council of Fifty on 1 March 1845.

Foster moved to Nauvoo, Illinois, around 27 April 1844, bringing the daguerreotype shortly after its introduction with him, setting up a daguerreotype studio on Fulton Street in August 1844. The Mormon photojournalist and writer Nelson B. Wadsworth speculated that Foster learned how to daguerreotype under Samuel F. B. Morse, although this has been disputed for lack of evidence. Foster released his first advertisement in the Nauvoo Neighbor on 14 August 1844 which said that he could produce "an image of the person, as exact as that formed by the mirror transferred to, and permanently fixed upon a highly polished silver through the agency of an optical instrument." He went on to produce the first photographic images of Nauvoo and its citizens from 1844 to 1846. However, some of the photographs attributed to him are, properly speaking, of unknown authorship. He was present in the grand jury of Nauvoo during the May 1845 term, along with four other Mormons: Daniel Spencer, Hiram Kimball, Samuel Bent, and Peter Hawes (1796–1860). He was also a member of the Nauvoo Masonic Lodge.

Foster had four wives by proxy sealing: Harriet Eliza Burr, Mary Ann Graham, Ann Mariah Still, and Eliza Leeman Ulrich.

In 1846, he was excommunicated by the nascent LDS Church and began affiliating with James Strang's breakaway Church of Jesus Christ of Latter Day Saints (Strangite) from 1846 to 1849 after having moved back to New York City. Foster was among those early Mormons who opposed the polygamous practice of plural marriage; after Parley P. Pratt took another plural wife, Phoebe Elizabeth Soper, Pratt visited Phoebe's father Samuel in Long Island, from whom he learned that Foster had reportedly told "the Old gentleman and Others that I have got Phebe and have now come for" Samuel's other daughters. He also disappears from Church records after the Nauvoo era. Foster moved to Brooklyn by 1870, but apparently died in Salt Lake City, only about six years later in 1876.

Some daguerreotypes attributed to Lucian R. Foster

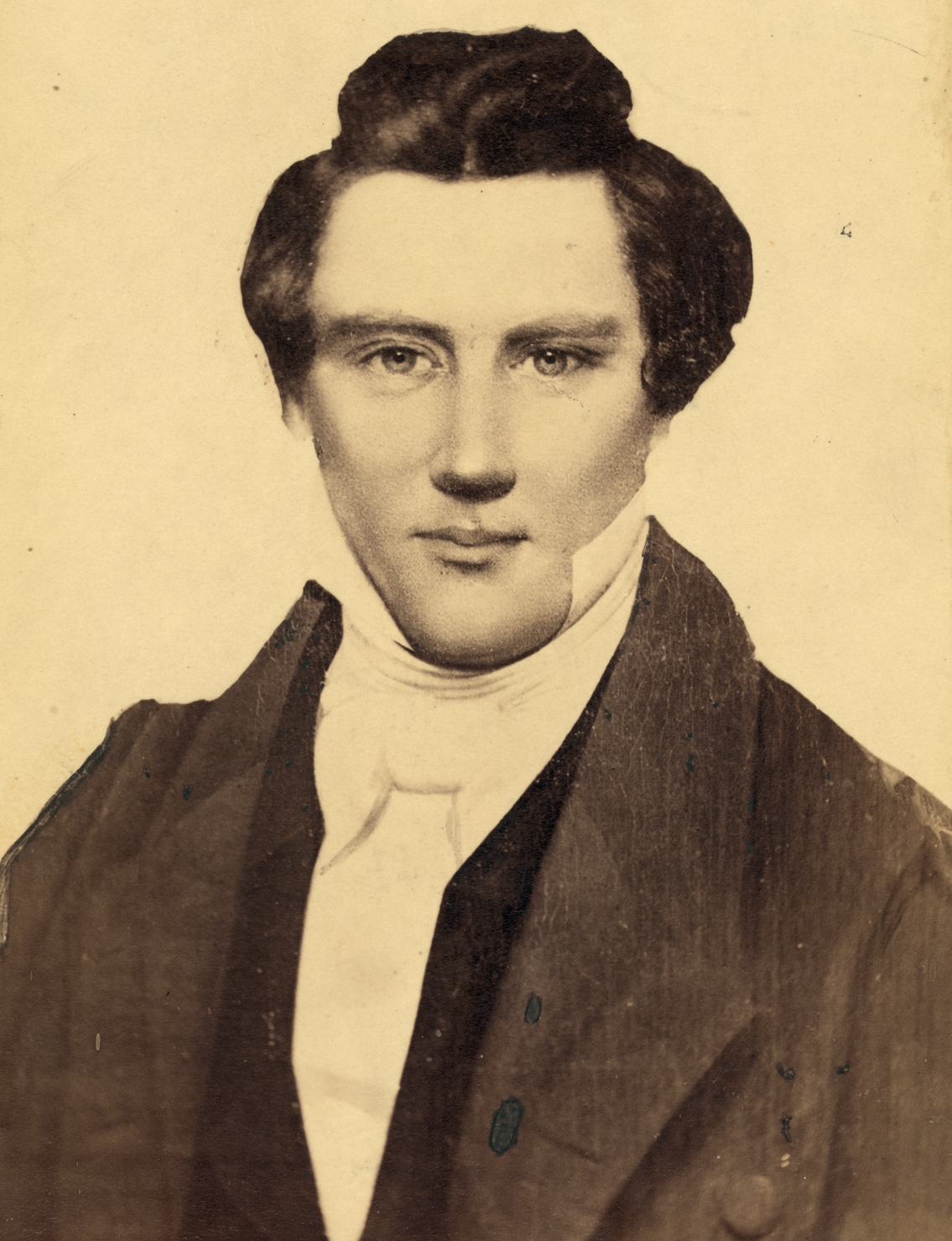
Joseph Smith, 1843

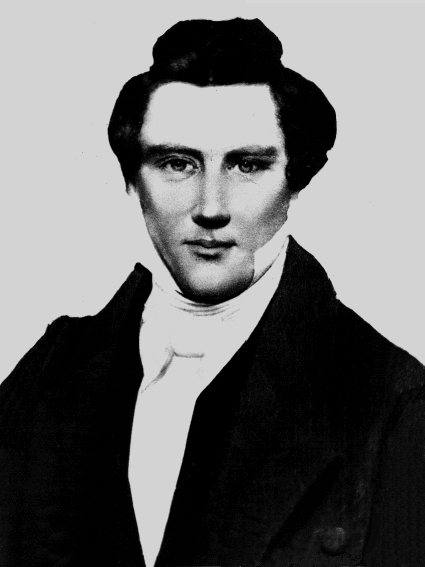
Joseph Smith, 1843

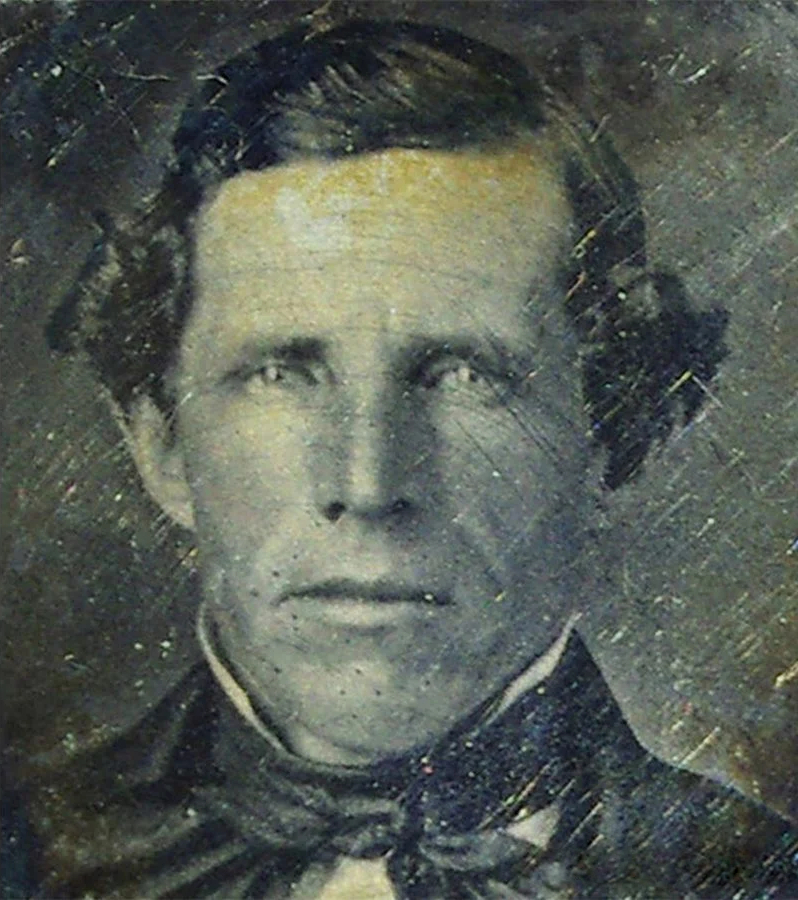
Joseph Smith, 1844

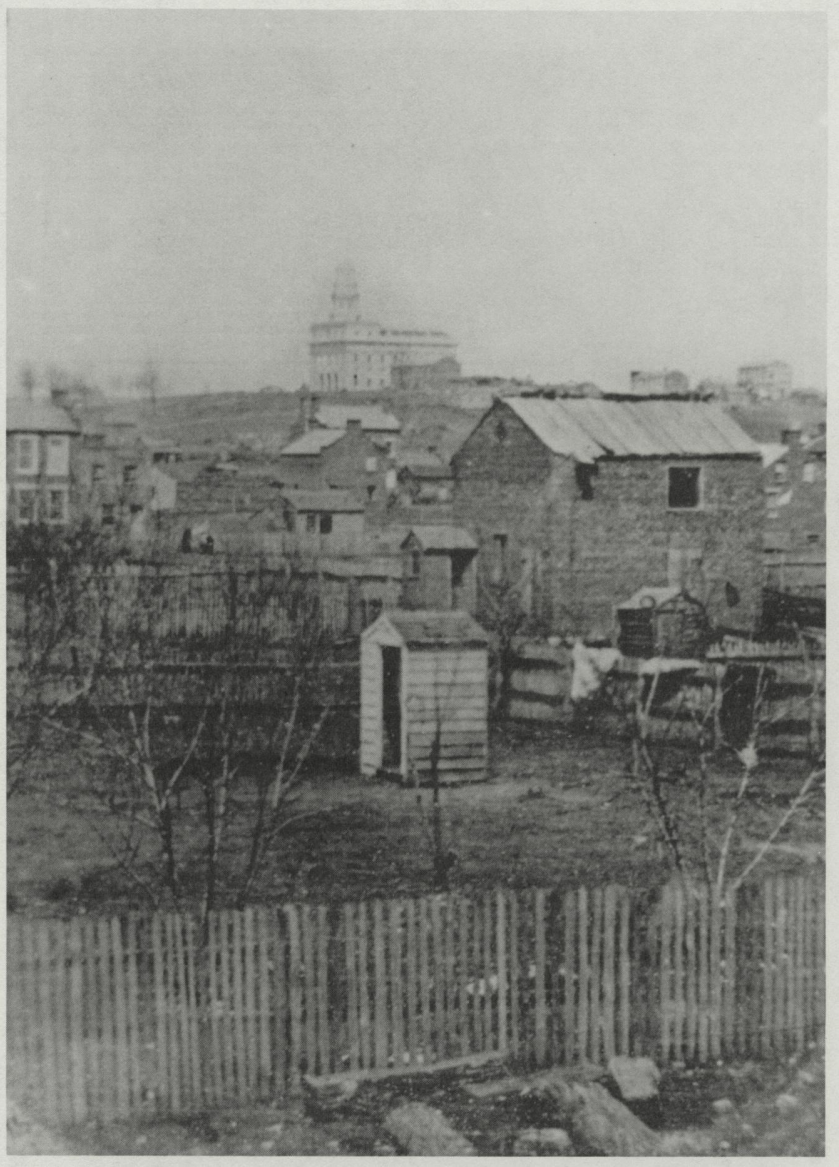
Nauvoo Temple, c. 1846

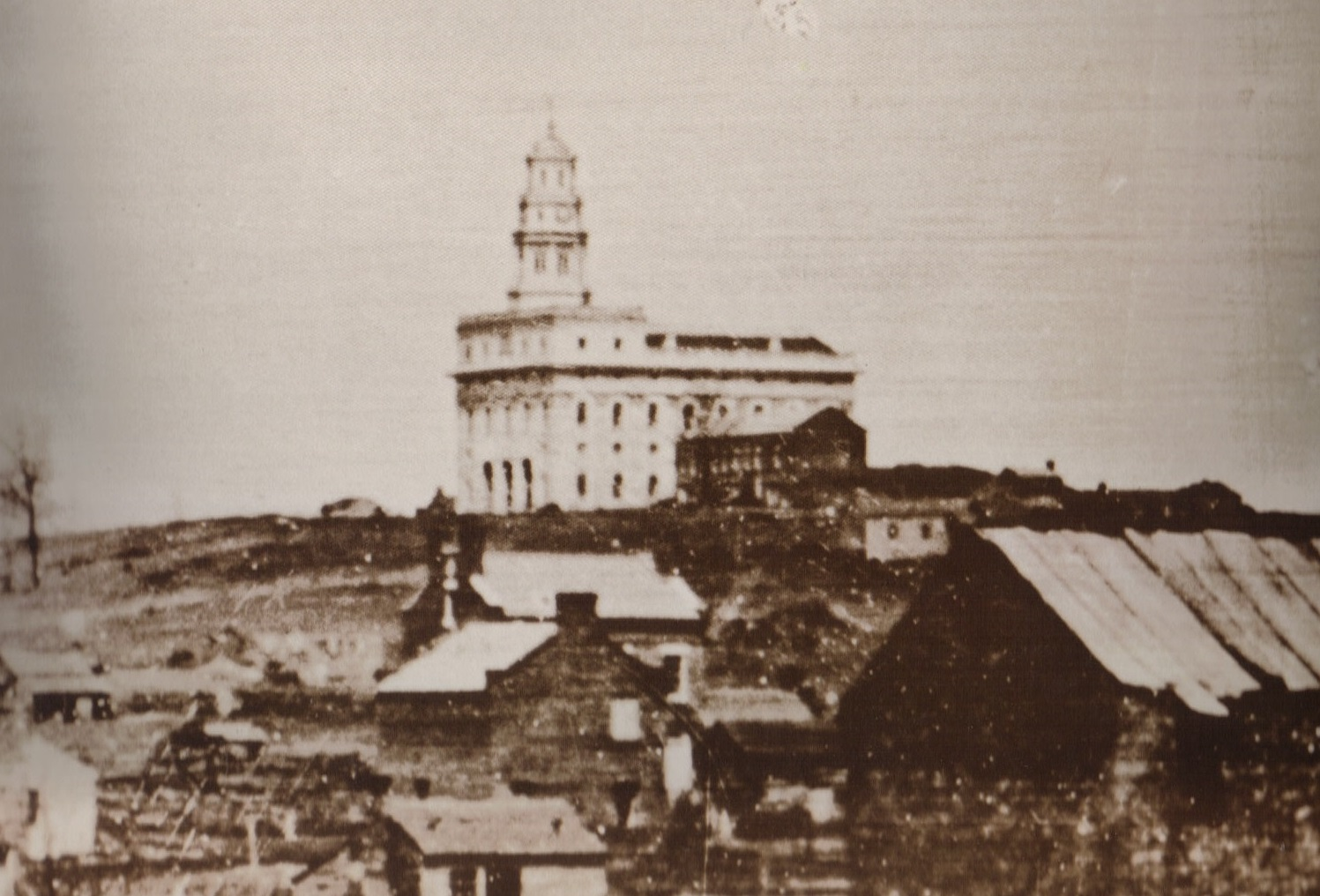
A zoomed-in version of the Nauvoo Temple daguerreotype

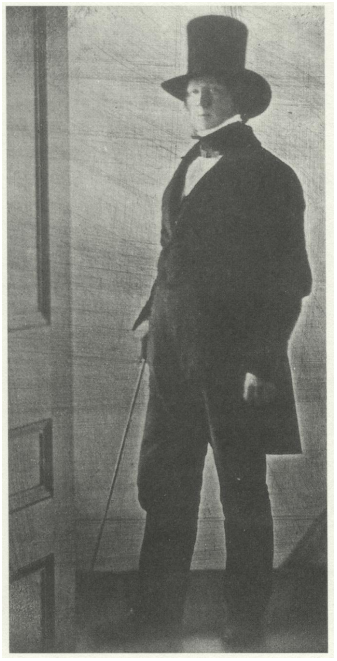
Brigham Young, c. 1846
