= Anti-Mormon Party (Illinois) =

- Founder: Thomas C. Sharp
- Founded: July 1841
- Dissolved: June 1844
- Ideology: Anti-Mormonism

The Anti-Mormon Party was a short-lived political party in Illinois in the early 1840s that espoused anti-Mormonism. The party was formed in Hancock County to oppose the political power Joseph Smith held in Nauvoo, Illinois, as the mayor of the city, head of the Nauvoo Legion, and prophet to the city's Latter Day Saint residents.

The party was organized in July 1841 by Thomas C. Sharp, editor of the Warsaw Signal. The June 23 edition of the Warsaw Signal printed a report that delegates had been elected to the "Anti-Mormon Convention" that was to be held on June 28. The meeting also resolved "[t]hat it is expedient to hold a county convention, for the purpose of nominating candidates for the offices of School and County Commissioners, in opposition to Mormon influence and dictation."

In 1841, the party nominated Richard Wilton for Hancock County School Commissioner and Robert Miller for County Commissioner. Neither candidate was elected in the August 1841 elections. By 1844, the party was being referred to as the "Central Anti-Mormon Committee" of Hancock County; the committee was led by Sharp, William N. Grover, and Henry Stephens.

The party continued its existence until it gradually died out after June 1844, when Joseph Smith was killed by an armed mob and the majority of Latter Day Saints subsequently made it known that they intended on leaving Illinois. The five men who were tried and acquitted of murdering Smith—Sharp, Grover, Mark Aldrich, Jacob C. Davis, and Levi Williams—were all members of the Anti-Mormon Party.

== See also ==
- American Party (Utah)
- Liberal Party (Utah)
