= Nauvoo Legion =

City militia, Illinois, U.S., 1841–1845

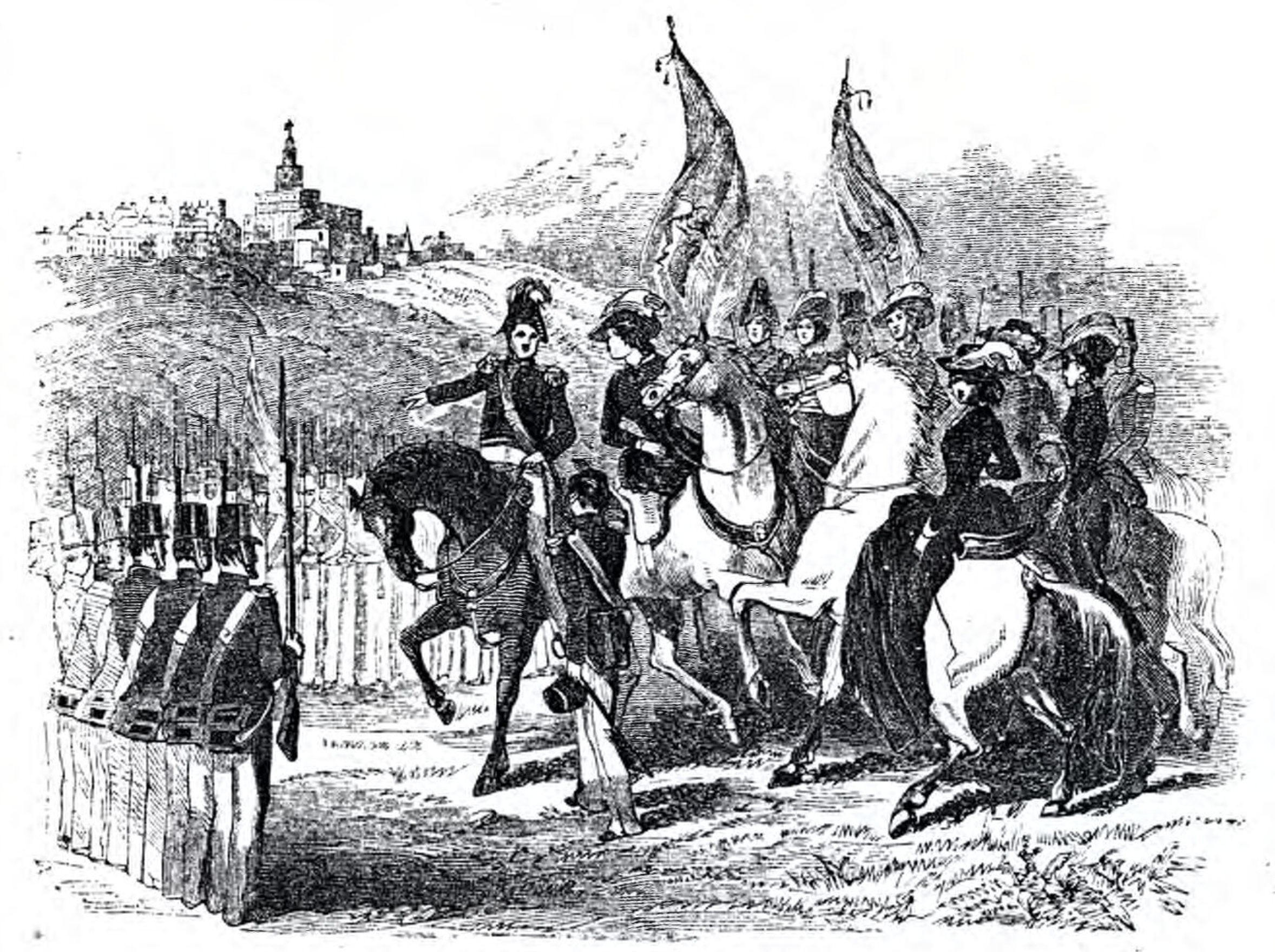
- Joseph Smith inspecting the Nauvoo Legion
- Active: 1841–1845
- Country: United States
- Allegiance: United States: Illinois; Mayor of Nauvoo
- Branch: Illinois State Militia (1841–1845)
- Type: Militia
- Role: Protect Mormon settlers from domestic and foreign enemies
- Size: Illinois State Militia (2,500)
- Engagements: Illinois Mormon War (1844–1846); Battle of Nauvoo (1846)

Commanders
- Notable commanders: Lieutenant General Joseph Smith; Lieutenant General Brigham Young; Major General John C. Bennett; Major General Wilson Law; Major General Charles C. Rich; Daniel H. Wells; Hosea Stout

The Nauvoo Legion was a state-authorized militia of Nauvoo, Illinois, United States from February 4, 1841, until January 29, 1845. Its main function was the defense of Nauvoo and surrounding Latter Day Saint settlements, but it was also occasionally used as local law enforcement and paraded at ceremonies such as the laying of the cornerstone for the Nauvoo Temple. The Nauvoo Legion was unique among contemporary militias for its chain of command structure, its expanded functions of the court martial, and for operating at a city level.

The Legion's presence was a significant factor in tensions between Nauvoo and its neighbors. The militia received criticism for its loyalty to Joseph Smith, founder of the Latter Day Saint movement and mayor of Nauvoo. In 1843, Legion members controversially helped Smith avoid extradition into Missouri. In 1844, Joseph Smith ordered the Nauvoo Legion to destroy the Nauvoo Expositor newspaper. Smith was charged with inciting a riot and placed in Carthage Jail where he was killed by a mob.

In 1845 the Legion lost its official sanction as an arm of the Illinois militia, though activities continued under command of Brigham Young until the expulsion of the Latter-day Saints from the state. The final conflict in Illinois involving remaining Legion members occurred in September 1846.

== Formation in Nauvoo ==
In 1839, Joseph Smith relocated his followers from a hostile environment in Missouri to Commerce, Illinois, which he renamed Nauvoo. Aiming to win the Mormon voting bloc, Illinois Democrats and Whigs (including Abraham Lincoln) passed a bipartisan city-state charter for Nauvoo in 1840. On December 16, 1840 Governor Thomas Carlin approved the charter, which was certified by then Secretary of State Stephen A. Douglas. In February 1841 the law went into effect, granting Smith and the city of Nauvoo broad powers including the authority to create a militia. This military force was a militia similar to the Illinois State Militia, and it became known as the "Nauvoo Legion". The Legion was organized into two brigades (called cohorts) of artillery/infantry and one of cavalry. A few light cannons were also attached. The names "cohort" and "legion" were uncommon designators for militia, and were chosen to emulate ancient Roman units of the same name.

By April 1841, over 600 men had enrolled in the Legion. By the end of 1841 that number had grown to around 1,500. At its peak, the militia had, by conservative estimates, at least 2,500 troops, in comparison to the approximately 8,500 troops within the entire United States Army as of 1845. On March 12, 1842 the growing city of Nauvoo was divided into four military districts (aligning with the four city wards), with four corresponding companies that would comprise the fourth regiment of the second brigade. On June 13, 1842, Charles C. Rich organized a fifth regiment of the second cohort.

The Legion was unique among American militia organizations for its disproportionate number of high-ranking officers to regular soldiers. At one point there were 13 major-generals and an even higher number of brigadier-generals. Other ranks commissioned for the Nauvoo Legion included Judge Advocate, Assistant Chaplain, and Herald and Armour-Bearer. Although the United States army and other contemporary militias held no office higher than a major-general, Joseph Smith held the rank of lieutenant-general, an honor that had not been bestowed on any American since George Washington. Historian Harold Schindler argues that the rank of Lieutenant General was granted to Smith by the State of Illinois in exchange for the Latter Day Saint vote in upcoming elections. Brigham Young remarked, "If the war [with Mexico] broke out, he would have become commander-in-chief of the United States armies."

== Organizational chain of command ==
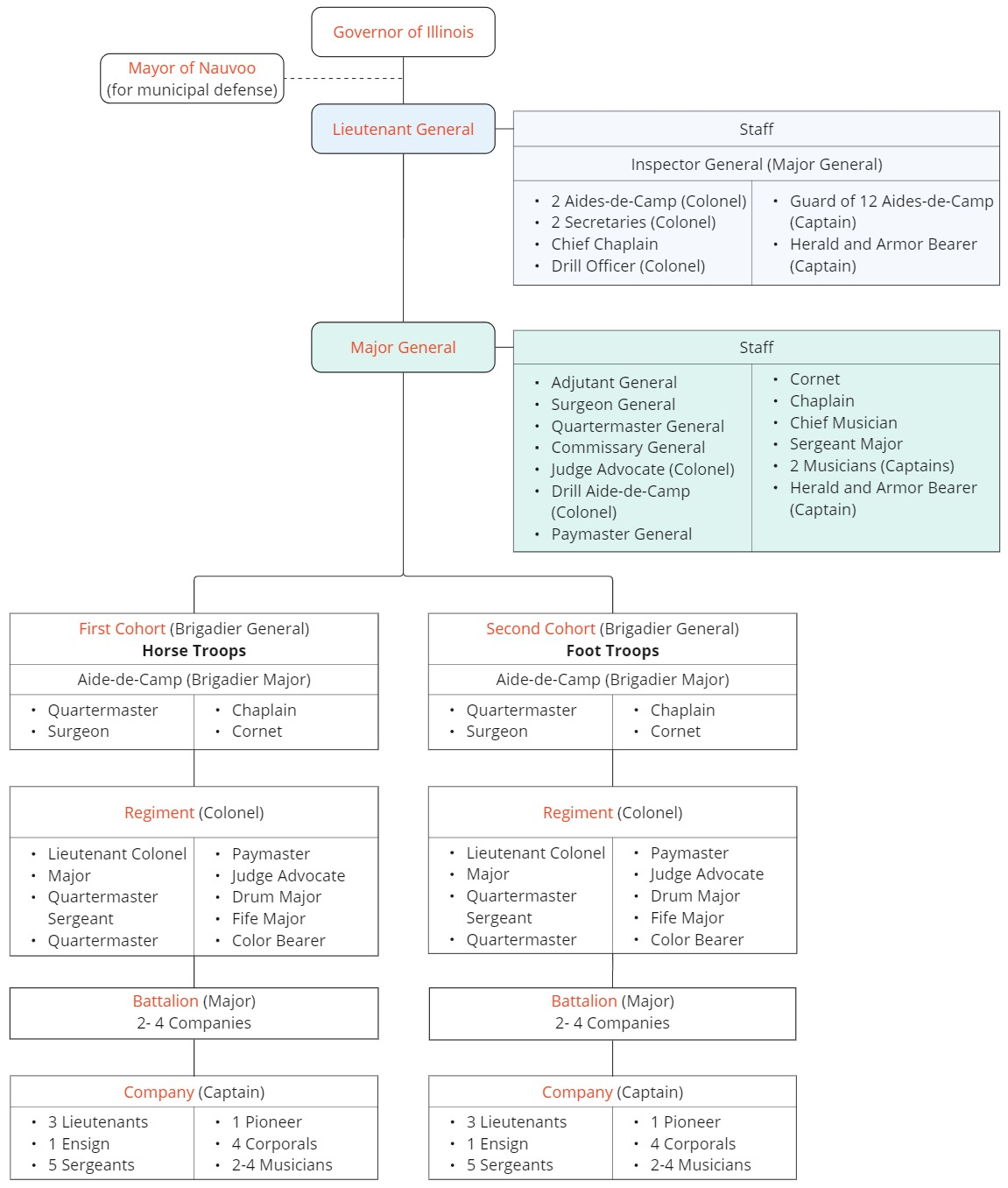
Nauvoo Legion chain of command. For comparison, see typical state militia.

Nauvoo forming a city militia was uncommon, as typical militias of the time were formed within the county or state. The Nauvoo Legion was a regular unit of the Illinois state militia. The state, rather than the county militia, provided arms to the legion, and service in the legion exempted members from mandatory service in the state or county militia. Officers in the legion were elected by the legion itself, but officers received their commission from the governor of the state.

The state governor or the President of the United States had the power to call on the Nauvoo Legion for public defense of the state and country. Uncommon for the time, the power to call upon the Legion extended to the mayor of Nauvoo for municipal defense, creating a measure of independence from the county militia and state government. Joseph Smith himself was Nauvoo's second mayor, and the Nauvoo court martial also appointed him as highest-ranking officer of the Legion, a Lieutenant General. Gardner et al. argue that Joseph Smith's use of this power was one of the direct causes for the later suppression of the Legion.

=== Role of the court martial ===
The Nauvoo Legion court martial differed in several ways from contemporary militias. Typical American courts-martial are exclusively judicial entities, created to try military personnel in accordance with military law. The state legislature granted the Nauvoo Legion additional legislative and executive powers: 1) the Nauvoo Legion court martial was granted the power to make, ordain, establish, and execute laws and ordinances and 2) The Nauvoo Legion was placed at the disposal of the city mayor to enforce city laws. (Note: John C. Bennett had previously been instrumental in the formation of a militia in Fairfield Illinois, the "Invincible Dragoons", that also granted legislative powers to the court martial, and this may have been the inspiration for a similar function being granted to the Nauvoo Legion.)

On February 8, 1841, in accordance with the city charter, the Nauvoo City Council further expanded the executive power of the court martial to internally nominate officers for original commissions and promotions at a municipal level. This was also a departure from typical procedure in contemporary state militias. Officers were chosen by popular election, and then commissioned at the state level. At the same time, it granted the court martial the legislative duty to mirror the United States army "so far as applicable" in terms of discipline, drill, uniform, rules, and regulations.

== Activities in Nauvoo ==
=== Laying of the cornerstone of the Nauvoo Temple ===
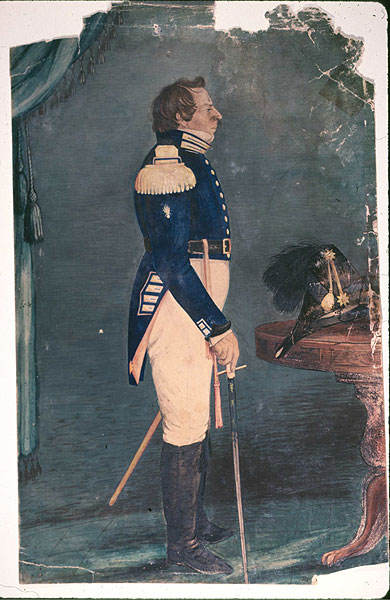
Joseph Smith dressed for official functions and ceremonies of the Nauvoo Legion, painted by Sutcliffe Maudsley

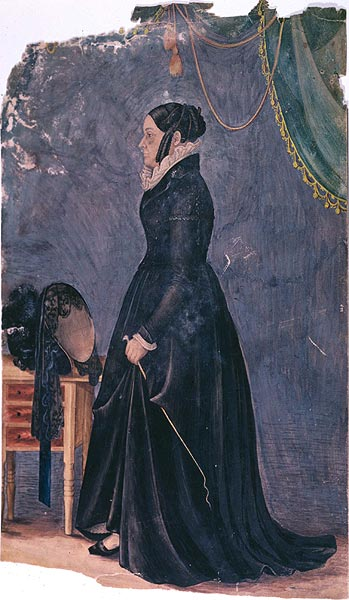
Emma Smith and other women of Nauvoo would sometimes accompany the Nauvoo Legion on horseback, painted by Sutcliffe Maudsley

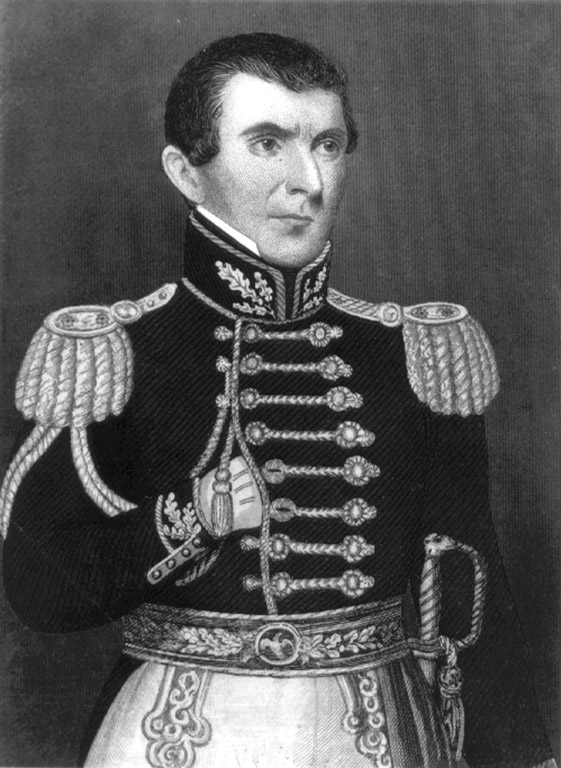
Major General John C. Bennett

On April 6, 1841 the Nauvoo Legion paraded in a full military display as part of the temple's cornerstone ceremony. Nauvoo's fourteen companies and two volunteer Mormon cohorts marched from assigned points to the temple grounds, led by Brigadier Generals William Law and Don Carlos Smith. Their entrances were marked by artillery fire. At 9:30 am, Lieutenant General Joseph Smith reviewed the Legion, surrounded by guard, staff, and field officers. His entrance was marked by distant cannon fire. He appeared on horseback in full military suit – a black cap with a red plume, a black coat, a red sash, and white pants, edged down the sides with red stripes. Emma Smith rode sidesaddle next to him, followed by a number of women on horseback; during the ceremonies Emma presented Joseph with a silk American flag. They were joined on stage by Major General John C. Bennett.

The ceremonies included religious services, public singing, dedicatory prayers, speeches by Sidney Rigdon and Joseph Smith, after which temple architects lowered the southeast corner stone into place. A hollow space in the cornerstone was filled with items such as a Bible, a Book of Mormon, a hymn book and silver money that had been coined that year. The ceremonies concluded with music from the military band and choir.

Local newspaper owner Thomas C. Sharp attended the ceremonies as a visiting dignitary. This event, combined with John C. Bennett's appointment by Stephen Douglas to Master in Chancery in Hancock County, led Sharp to become a leading opponent of Joseph Smith. Sharp reflected a growing sentiment in Illinois that the combined military and religious Latter Day Saint community posed a threat to the democratic values of individual freedom and separation of church and state, writing, "Every thing they say or do seems to breathe the spirit of military tactics. Their prophet appears, on all great occasions in his splendid regimental dress.... Truly fighting must, be a part of the creed of these Saints!"

=== Junior Legion and Benjaminites ===
Up to 600 boys from Nauvoo decided to form a military unit in imitation of their fathers, and would parade and drill whenever their fathers did so. Their mothers made uniforms for them; white pants, colorful blouse and a palm hat. Joseph Smith III as a boy carried a wooden sword and a banner that read, "Our fathers we respect; our mothers we'll protect." Other boys also had wooden guns. At one point, they decided to conduct a raid on Nauvoo, mustering outside of town and then rushing into the city. They used pots and pans to make noise as they marched in, causing the horses to panic. According to Joseph Smith III, Joseph Smith rode forward on his horse and the boys scattered.

Additionally, older men in Nauvoo organized into a group they called the "Benjaminite Company", at one point asking the privilege of assembling with the Legion, writing to the court martial, "we still feel the spirit of seventy-six burning in our bosom, and are willing to grasp the sling and hurl the stone like David of Old."

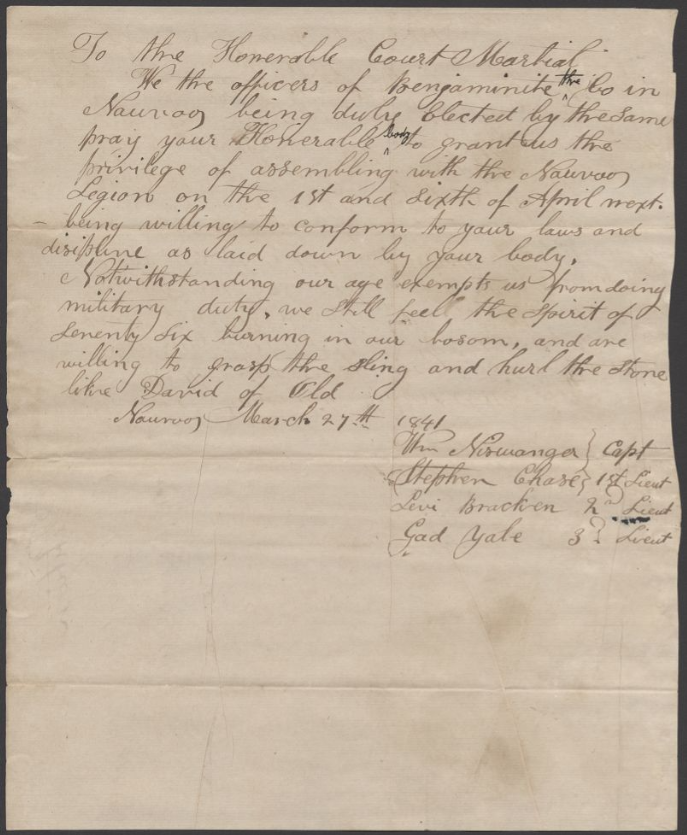
Letter written by the Benjaminites to the Nauvoo Legion

=== Usage as local law enforcement ===
Prior to 1843 Nauvoo did not have a police force, and the Nauvoo Legion was used as local law enforcement. According to John Lee Allaman, "Prophet Joseph Smith and the Nauvoo City Council often used the legion as a primary agent for law and order."

On October 30, 1841, the city council ordered two companies of the Nauvoo Legion to destroy a local grog shop that was declared a public nuisance.

On December 15, 1841, the Nauvoo Times and Seasons reported the city watch was disbanded and reorganized as a Legion assignment.

From May to October 1842, Joseph Smith in his role as mayor established a night watch consisting of 8–16 members of the Nauvoo Legion. They maintained a shift from 6 pm–6 am and reported directly to the mayor.

On August 14, 1842, Smith ordered Major General Wilson Law to "preserve the peace of the city of Nauvoo" in any emergency situation.

Governor Ford forbade the Legion from acting as a police force on December 12, 1843, leading to an expansion of the official police force, and limiting further police activities by the Nauvoo Legion.

=== Removal of John C. Bennett as Major General ===
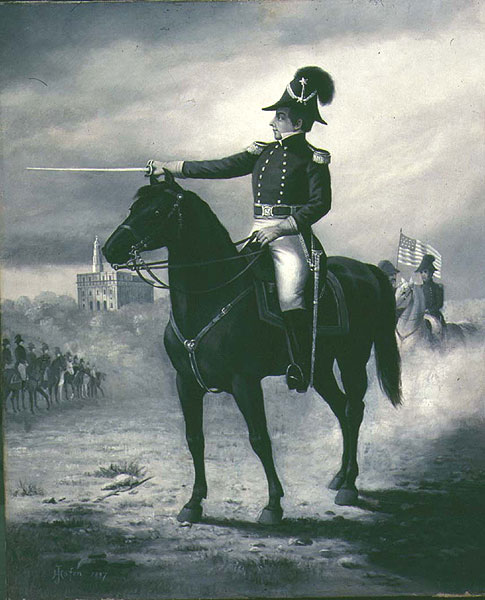
Painting of Smith directing the Legion

The Nauvoo Legion would sometimes perform theatrical military displays to garner local support. On May 7, 1842 the Nauvoo Legion mustered as part of a “Programme Militaire.” They performed a sham battle and Joseph Smith gave an address. Special guests, including Judge Stephen A. Douglas, attended and were invited to Smith's home for dinner. This event marked a breaking point in the strained relationship between Joseph Smith and John C. Bennett.

During the sham battle, Bennett had asked Joseph to move to the rear of the cavalry without his usual guards; Albert Rockwood, commander of the prophet's bodyguards, objected and Smith chose a different spot. Rumors spread that Bennett had attempted to assassinate Smith during the demonstration. Although not the only factor in the dissolution of their collaboration, by the end of the month Bennett resigned from office of mayor, was removed from leadership in the Nauvoo Legion, was expelled from the Nauvoo Masonic Lodge, and was excommunicated from the church. On August 3, 1842, Wilson Law won a close election with Lyman Wight, and became the Major General of the Nauvoo Legion.

=== Thwarted extradition of Joseph Smith ===
On June 17, 1843, a warrant for Joseph Smith's arrest was jointly issued by Illinois Governor Thomas Ford and Missouri Governor Thomas Reynolds on grounds of treason. On June 23 Joseph Smith was arrested in the town of Dixon and preparations made to extradite him to Missouri. In response, the Nauvoo City council enacted what amounted to martial law and Nauvoo Legion troops organized and waited for instruction.

On June 25, Joseph Smith sent a letter to Major General Wilson Law, asking him to bring a force to prevent his “being kidnapped into Missouri.” In all, between 100–300 men left Nauvoo to rescue Joseph Smith. On June 27, Nauvoo Legion scouts intercepted the arresting party and Joseph Smith told his captors, “I am not going to Missouri this time. These are my boys!”

On June 29, Generals Wilson and William Law, 60 of the Nauvoo cavalry, and 100 additional men escorted the party to Nauvoo, where Joseph Smith was released by the municipal court. Smith spent the next few days greeting volunteer units of the Nauvoo Legion as they returned home, blessing them for their loyalty and efforts, and recounting the story of his kidnapping and triumphant return.

==== Missouri response ====
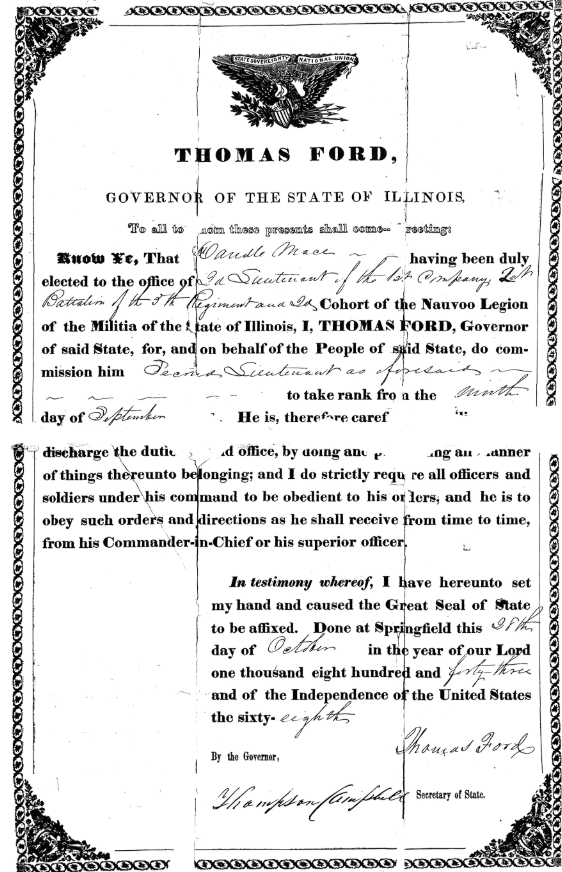
Commissioning document of Wandle Mace in 1843.

Reaction to the failed extradition from Missouri was swift and negative. Missouri Governor Thomas Reynolds felt the Legion had overreached its authority and demanded Illinois Governor Ford to call out the state militia to arrest Joseph Smith and extradite him to Missouri. Governor Ford did not comply, which increased tension between the two states and infuriated many of the non-Mormon residents of Hancock County. The Warsaw Signal published, "It will be but a small matter to raise volunteers enough here to raze the city of Nauvoo to the ground; if the governor of Illinois fears to deliver up Jo Smith, there will be something serious between the two states."

In September 1843, a conference in Carthage, Illinois was organized to oppose growing Mormon political power. The conference believed that Smith had too much power over the Legion and Municipal Court. The conference resolved to resist "peaceably if we can, but forcibly, if we must"; to call on the Missouri Governor to once again demand the extradition of Joseph Smith, and to oppose any politician from any party that would "truckle to the heads of the Mormon clan."

In Nauvoo, the Legion responded by drilling more intensely, requesting Governor Ford to provide more arms to the Legion, and a renewed recruitment push. In direct response to the Carthage conference, the citizenry of Nauvoo passed a resolution affirming Joseph Smith's role as the General, Mayor and Prophet stating, "if he has equals, he has no superiors." The resolution affirmed the professionalism of the Legion as a "well disciplined and faithful band of invincibles" and praised Governor Ford for not extraditing Smith.

==== Impact on 1843 election ====
Smith's attorney, Congressional Whig candidate Cyrus Walker, had agreed to represent him in return for the Mormon vote. However, Smith later told his followers that while he would keep his word and vote for Walker, his brother Hyrum Smith had a revelation they should vote for the opponent Joseph Hoge. The Mormon bloc vote was a deciding factor and Hoge won the district by a margin of 547 votes. This was interpreted as a "bait-and-switch maneuver", "a flimsy ruse" and a "betrayal." It weakened Nauvoo's political support from the Whigs, and curtailed attempts from all parties to court the Mormon vote. This reneged promise, along with Smith's use of the Legion to avoid extradition, became the basis for growing anti-Mormon sentiment and a bipartisan political movement to revoke the Nauvoo Charter.

=== Arrest of Daniel and Philander Avery ===
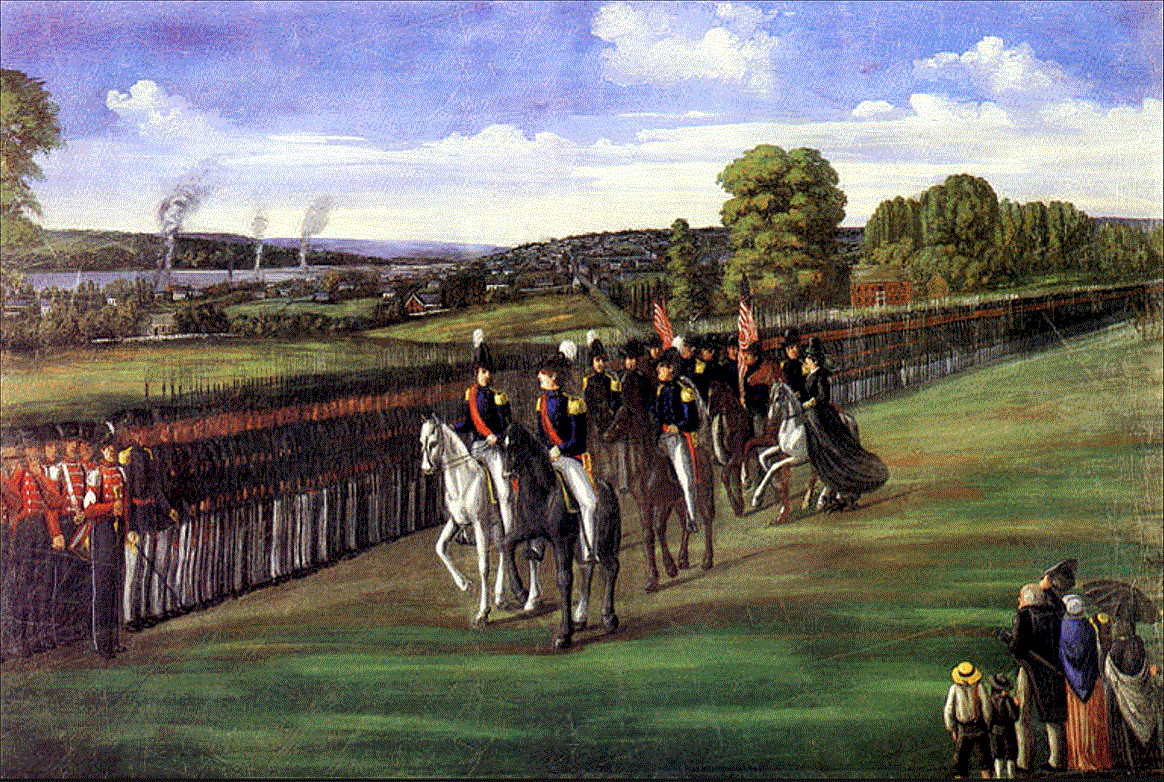
Joseph Mustering the Nauvoo Legion (C. C. A. Christensen, 1912)

On November 19, 1843 individuals from Missouri arrested Philander Avery and then on December 2, 1843 arrested his father Daniel Avery on charges of horse theft. With the assistance of Hancock County Illinois residents, they were taken to a Monticello, Missouri jail. The arrest was viewed as a kidnapping in Nauvoo generating a nervous atmosphere in the city of Nauvoo. Joseph Smith made a request to Governor Ford to call out the Legion, which was denied by Governor Ford in a letter dated December 12, who feared conflict with Missouri writing, "I would advise your citizens to be strictly peaceable torwards the people of Missouri." On the same day, December 12, the Nauvoo City Council enacted an ordinance allowing for a municipal police force with Hosea Stout as its Chief of Police, greatly expanding an earlier "city watch" that had been created on January 30, 1843. The police force was under the authority of the city council, and could be ordered into action by the Mayor of Nauvoo, rather than the governor.

On December 18 Smith ignored the order from Governor Ford and called out both the city police force and members of the Legion to prepare against a rumored mob forming to the south in Warsaw, Illinois, tasking them to prepare to rescue the two men. The situation was defused when Philander Avery escaped, and on December 25 when Daniel Avery was released due to a writ of Habeas Corpus.

=== Nauvoo under Mormon martial law ===
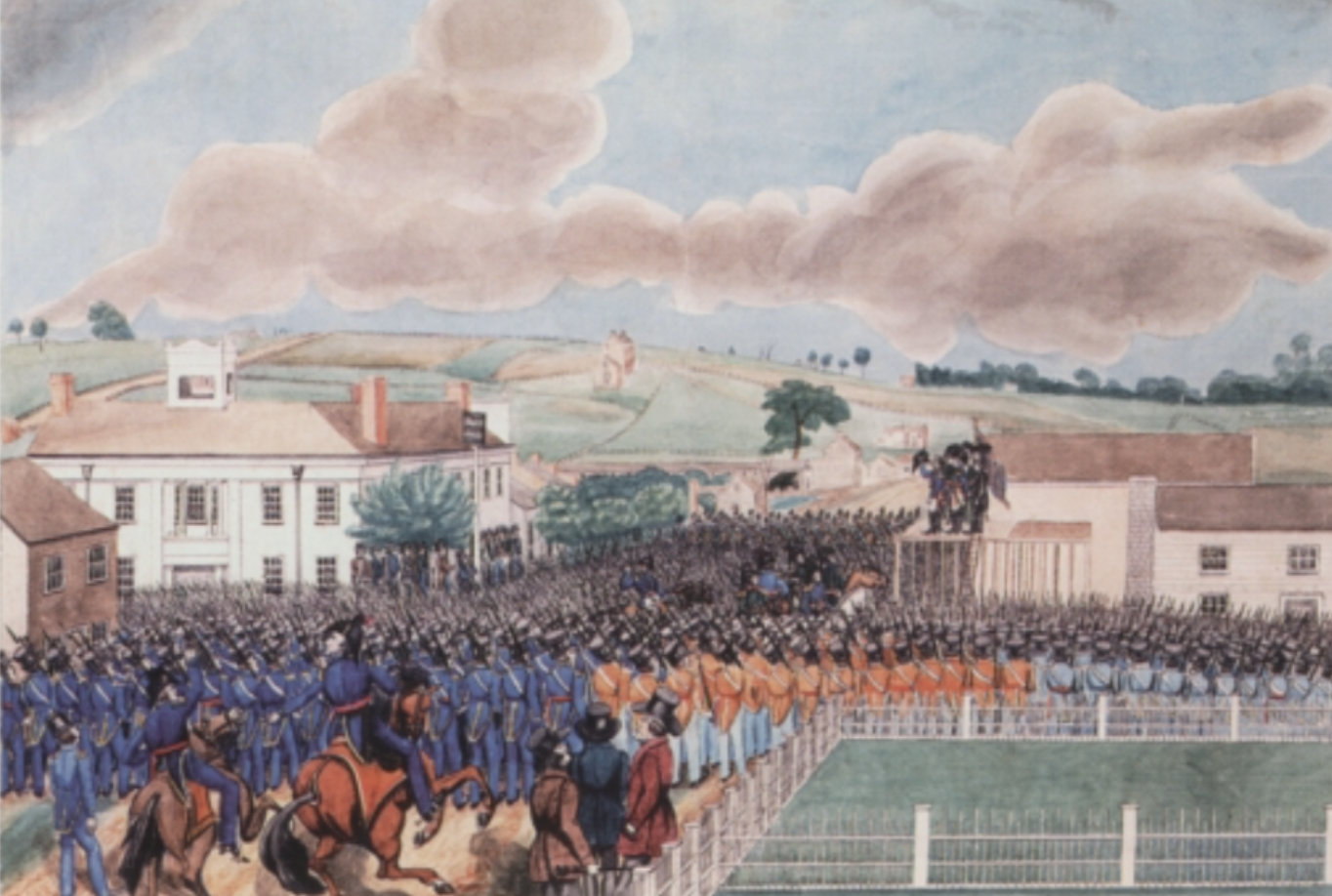
Smith addressing the Legion. This was a preliminary sketch done in 1845 for a panorama painting of the Legion to be hung in the Nauvoo temple, though it was never used.

Tensions between Nauvoo and surrounding non-Mormon settlements peaked by the summer of 1844, in part because the Legion came to be regarded as Smith's private army. Governor Thomas Ford called the militia "a military force at their own command." Tensions were further exacerbated by defectors from the Church of Jesus Christ of Latter Day Saints, including Wilson Law, who was the Legion's ranking Major General. Wilson Law was excommunicated from the church on April 18 over his opposition to the doctrine of plural marriage and a court martial was held that expelled Law from the Legion on April 29. At the same time on April 29, Charles C. Rich was ordered to take command of the Legion. For a while over the next months, Jonathan Dunham filled in for Rich as Major General while Rich was away in Michigan.

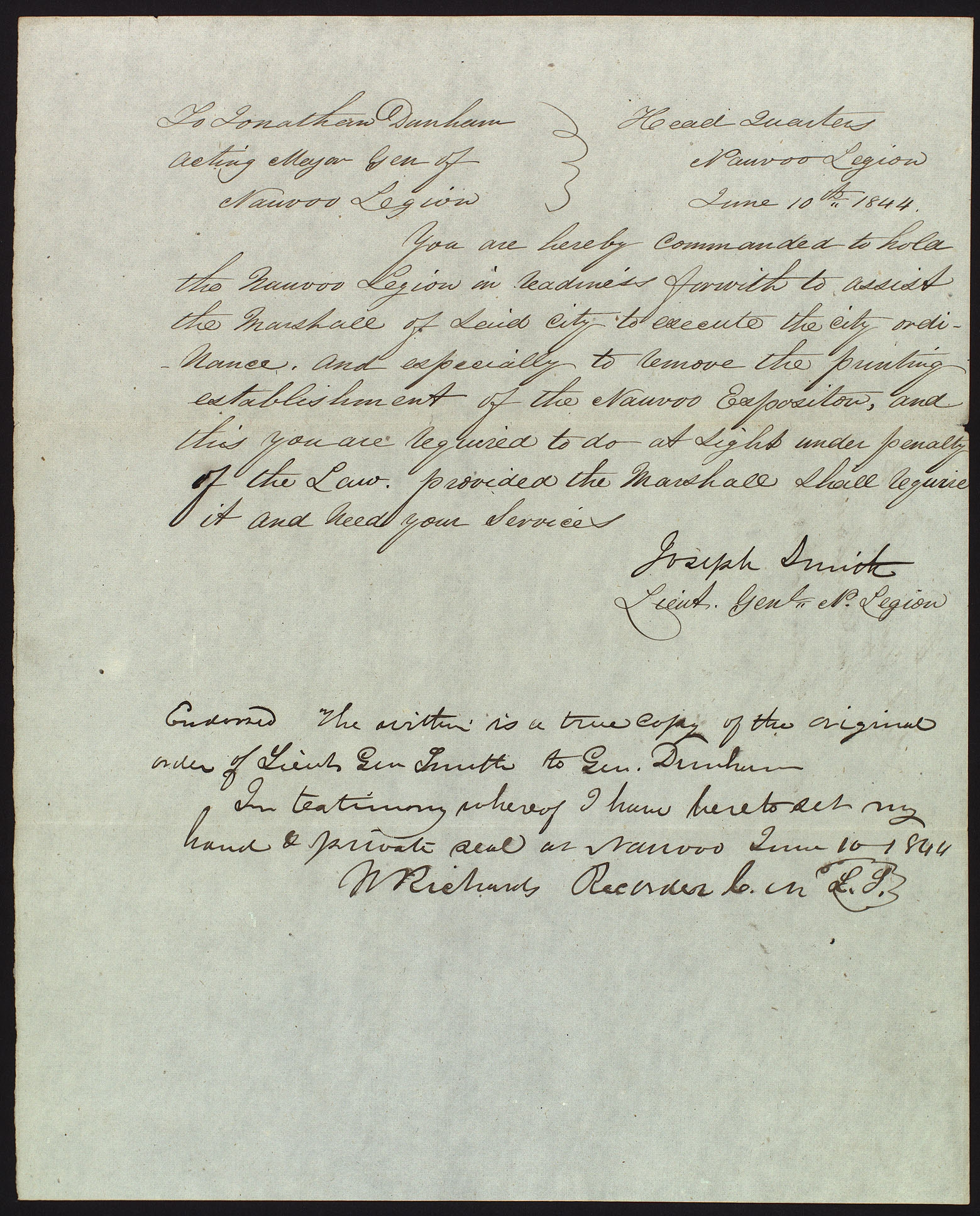
Smith's order to the Legion to remove the Nauvoo Expositor

Wilson Law and his brother William Law were key in starting the Nauvoo Expositor, a newspaper critical of Smith and his doctrines of plural marriage. On June 10, 1844, the Nauvoo City council declared the Nauvoo Expositor to be a public nuisance. Smith, acting as mayor, ordered the city marshal to destroy the printing press and materials.

Acting as Lieutenant General, Smith ordered Major General Jonathan Dunham to use the Legion to assist the city marshal. Non-Mormons claimed the Legion was instrumental in destroying the press and called for the arrest of Smith and other members of the city council for riot. They were arrested but released by the Nauvoo city court on a writ of habeas corpus.

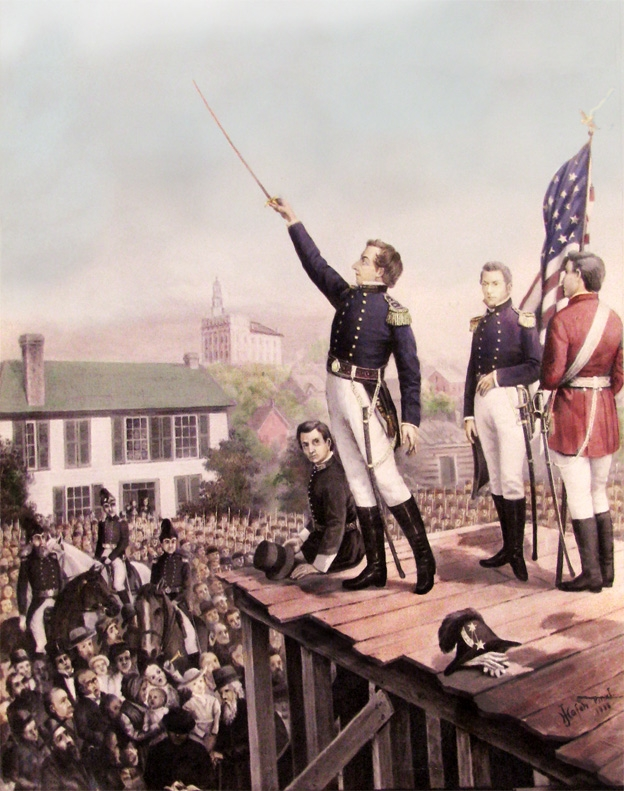
Last Public Address of Lieutenant General Joseph Smith (John Hafen, 1888)

On June 18, 1844, Smith spoke to the Legion from the platform of a partially constructed building across from the Nauvoo Mansion. He stood in full military dress and spoke for an hour and a half to a group of about 4000. Raising his sword, he said:

"I call God and angels to witness that I have unsheathed my sword with a firm and unalterable determination that this people shall have their legal rights, and be protected from mob violence, or my blood shall be split upon the ground like water, and my body consigned to the silent tomb."

He declared martial law and afterwards marched the troops through Main Street, deploying them across the city to protect from water or land invasions.

=== Arrest and killing of Joseph Smith ===
In response to Nauvoo's military activity, an opposing force of armed Illinois Militia gathered, numbering between 1600–1800 men. Governor Ford offered protection to Joseph Smith and his brother Hyrum Smith if they surrendered, but threatened to call out the state militia against Nauvoo if they did not. They agreed to submit to arrest on charges of inciting a riot and were taken to Carthage, Illinois. The judge in Carthage revoked bail based on a claim that the Mormons had tried to use the Nauvoo Legion against the state militia. Ford called off most of the Illinois militia and recalled state-issued arms in Nauvoo. In the late afternoon of June 27, 1844 the Carthage Jail where Joseph Smith and Hyrum Smith were held was attacked and they were killed.

About two thirds of the Legion had assembled in Nauvoo at noon on the day of the killing, but disbanded after an emissary from the Governor indicated that there was no danger to the Smiths. As word reached Nauvoo, the full Legion assembled on the parade grounds at 10:00 am on June 28, 1844, and accompanied the bodies of Joseph and Hyrum Smith to the Nauvoo Mansion. Leaders preached calm, and the Legion was not used at that time to avenge the deaths.

== Legion survival after death of Joseph Smith ==
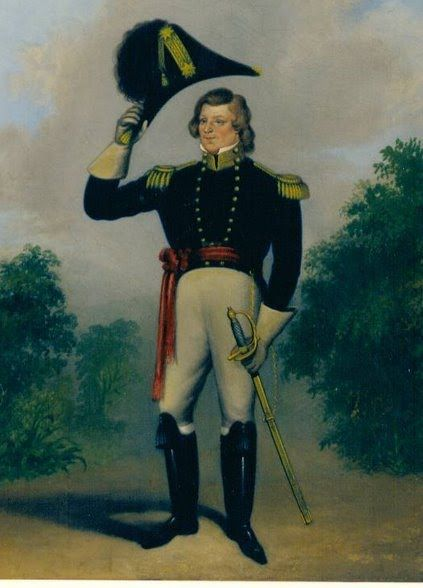
Brigham Young in military uniform

The death of Joseph Smith caused a succession crisis over who would lead the Church going forward. Brigham Young began to take on the roles Joseph Smith previously had, and on August 31, 1844 he was elected as the Legion's "Lieutenant General". Previously, Young had been an assistant chaplain. On September 27, Charles C. Rich was commissioned as the Major General of the Nauvoo Legion.

=== Wolf Hunt and Legion parade without arms ===
Tensions did not ease that summer between Mormon and anti-Mormons; while the Nauvoo City council issued writs against men accused of murdering the Smith brothers, plans were made to rid Hancock county of all Mormons. Distributed flyers invited all armed men to participate in a “wolf hunt” in Warsaw on September 26 and 27. Under the guise of a common practice to flush out animals along the prairie, this “wolf hunt” was a plan to attack Nauvoo.

Forced to respond, Governor Ford called on Brigadier General John J. Hardin and Whig Major Edward D. Baker to lead five hundred volunteers from nine counties surrounding Hancock towards Nauvoo. This movement was intended to 1) disperse the wolf hunt militia, 2) attempt arrests of men connected to the killing of the Smith brothers, and 3) gather the Nauvoo Legion for military inspection. Hardin effectively dispersed the gathering militias, however their leaders escaped to Missouri and otherwise evaded arrest. Ford noted, "The Carthage Greys fled almost in a body, taking their arms with them.”

On September 28, Brigham Young reviewed the Legion with General Hardin and Governor Ford in the audience. Many of the officers paraded without weapons, to remind Ford that he had recalled state-issued arms prior to the events at Carthage.

Throughout the fall of 1844 the Legion would occasionally parade and conduct sham battles.

=== Repeal of the Nauvoo Charter ===
On December 19, the Illinois Senate voted to repeal the Nauvoo Charter, and on January 24 the Illinois House passed its own version of legislation. On January 29, 1845, the Illinois council of revision signed the repeal, and the Nauvoo Legion was no longer recognized as state militia.

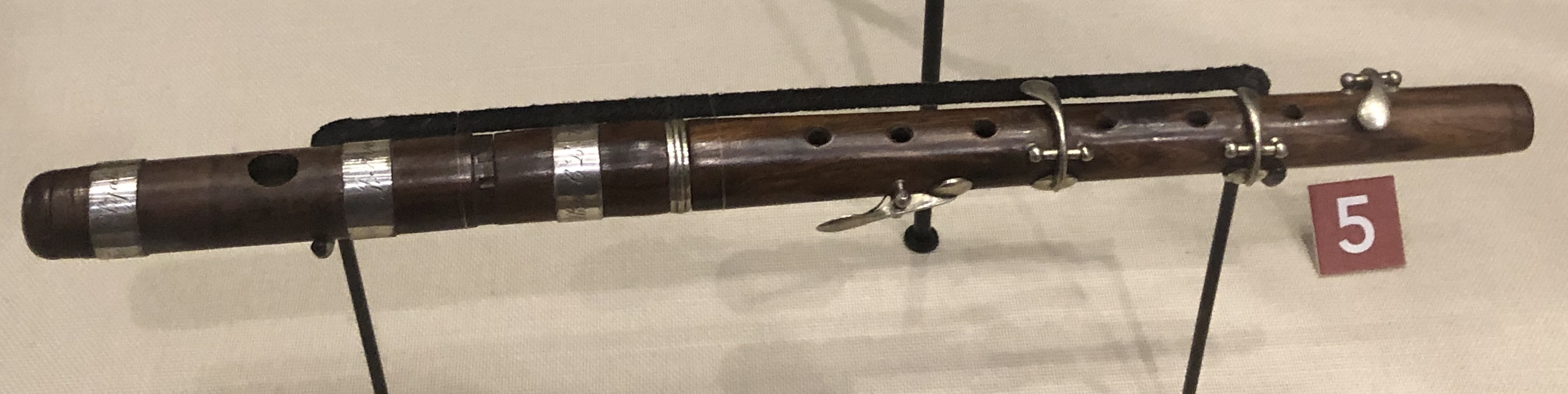
Fife owned by Elisha Averett of the Nauvoo Legion band, which performed during parades and military drills.

=== Whistling and Whittling Brigade ===
With the repeal of the Nauvoo Charter, the city was left without an official militia or police force. In response, in March 1845 Brigham Young organized the Bishops and Deacons to 1) "take care of the poor" and 2) guard the city at night, to keep everything straight.” Out of these efforts came an organization known as the Whistling and Whittling Brigade who used legal, nonviolent means to monitor apostates, strangers, "Gentiles," or enemies and encourage them to leave town. Members would surround and follow suspicious individuals without engaging in conversation; They whittled pieces of wood, casting shavings in the person's direction, all while whistling, gathering more members of the group. The organization lasted for less than two months and was phased out as Nauvoo regained law enforcement. Initially composed of adult men, the group attracted more and more youth until by April, boys as young as twelve took on active roles as Whittlers. This shift in demographic corresponded with increased criticism from within and without Nauvoo.

=== Nauvoo arsenal ===
After the recall of state-issued arms, the Legion rearmed themselves privately. While plans for an official arsenal had been discussed since at least June 10, 1843, it was not until September 16, 1844 that Lieutenant General Brigham Young dedicated a site near the temple "to the God of the armies of Israel" and broke ground. Prior to this point, the Nauvoo Masonic Hall had been used as a commissary and to store arms. Construction of the arsenal, in connection with construction of a gunsmith's shop and a powder magazine, continued despite the repeal of the Nauvoo Charter and the recall of state-issued arms. According to Prince, "On June 23, 1845 [Hosea Stout] wrote of going to see the arsenal, which is a clear inference that the Legion was storing weapons and military equipment."

The arsenal was funded in part through non-attendance fines. Nauvoo Legion Association Scrip was also issued in $5 quantities. Records in the Nauvoo Legion Arsenal Account book indicate that local merchants were sometimes paid to procure and ship arms and ammunition for the Legion.

Front of the Nauvoo Arsenal. Tower and porch were added later.

Back side of the Nauvoo Arsenal.

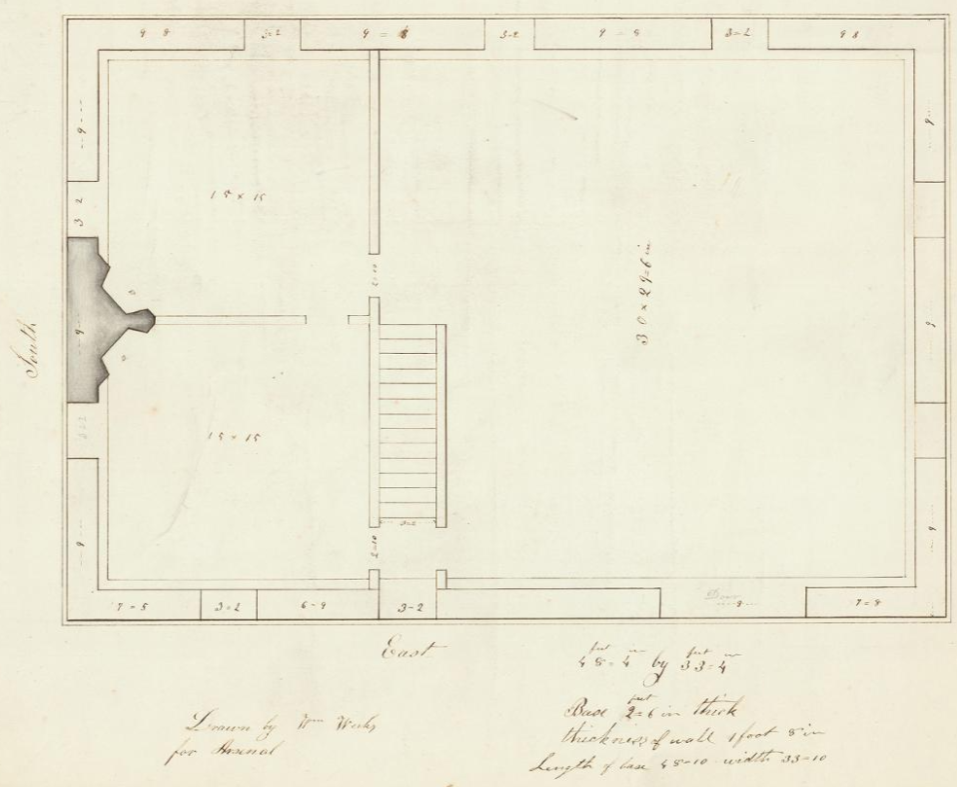
Floorplan of the Nauvoo Arsenal, designed by William Weeks.

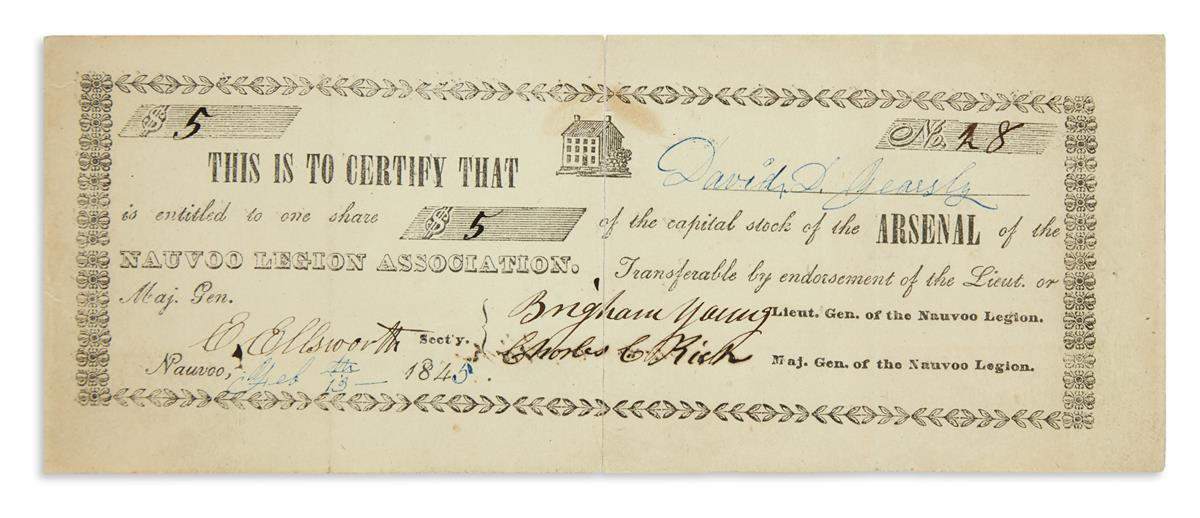
Nauvoo Legion Association Scrip was sold to raise funds for the Nauvoo Arsenal

=== Rising tensions ===
Although no longer sanctioned, the Legion continued to function as though it still had authorization, including drills, parades, and new military appointments. Major General Rich stopped using his military rank and took on the title "President of the Organized Quorums of the Church of Jesus Christ of Latter-day Saints in Hancock County."

At a September 9, 1845 meeting of the Anti-Mormon party, members were fired upon. In retaliation a group led by Levi Williams set fire to the Mormon settlements of Yelrome, Morley, and Lima and destroyed forty four homes. The morning of September 16, Lieutenant Frank Worrell of the nearby Carthage militia was shot and killed by Orrin Porter Rockwell after refusing an order to stop by non-Mormon Sherriff William Backenstos. Worrell had been the sergeant of the guard at Carthage when the Smiths were assassinated.

Backenstos and Rockwell went to Nauvoo and found Brigham Young, asking for assistance. Young offered 2,000 legionnaires to be commanded by Backenstos, who went through Hancock county burning "Gentile" property, and driving anti-Mormons from their homes, many of who fled across the border to Missouri and Iowa. Governor Ford wrote that "they sallied forth and ravaged the country, stealing and plundering whatever was convenient to carry or drive away."

Governor Ford sent an army of 400 troops along with Judge Stephen A. Douglas to stop the violence on both sides. The army searched for bodies of two men believed to be murdered by Mormons, and after pressure from the Anti-Mormon party, arrested Sherriff Backenstos for the murder of Worrell (Rockwell went into hiding).

== Departure from Nauvoo ==
On October 1, 1845 Brigham Young announced the Latter-day Saints would leave Nauvoo and travel west. On February 4, 1846 the first group of Latter-day Saints crossed the Mississippi River, with plans to evacuate the entire city by the fall of that year.

Sometime in the late winter or spring Governor Ford stationed a small militia unit in Nauvoo to preserve order as Mormons prepared to leave the city. He removed the unit on May 1, 1846, because of the expense and being outnumbered by those hostile and ready to attack the city.

On April 30, 1846 the Legion stood guard as the Nauvoo Temple was dedicated.

=== Battle of Nauvoo ===
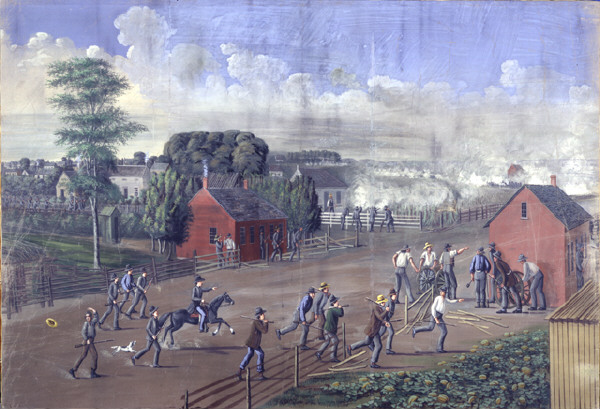
Depiction of the Battle of Nauvoo by C.C.A. Christensen

On September 10, 1846, 1,000 members of the anti-Mormon party marched on Nauvoo to expel the remaining several hundred Mormon citizens. In response, 150 men of Nauvoo gathered to defend themselves while women and children sheltered near the Temple. They were divided into the Spartan Band – remnant members of the Nauvoo Legion – and the Kill Devil Company – a group of non-Mormon New Citizens who were weary of anti-Mormon antagonism and hoped to defend their newly purchased property. Over the next five days the band of 150 withstood the siege of 1,000 men through methods such as guerrilla warfare, placing mines called a “hell's half acre”, and building up bulwarks. A steamboat shaft was turned into a makeshift cannon. Some women “gleaned” fields by collecting the anti-Mormon's discharged cannonballs to be reused in Mormon cannons. Three Mormons were killed and several injured on both sides.

On September 16, 1846, the Mormons surrendered, knowing that they could not withstand the siege indefinitely. They agreed to leave Nauvoo within five days. Even with the treaty terms, anti-Mormon militia members harassed the Mormons by ordering some out of the city at the point of a bayonet, entering the temple and shouting obscenities from the belltower, interfering with the burials, and searching departing wagons to remove weapons and goods.

== Legacy ==
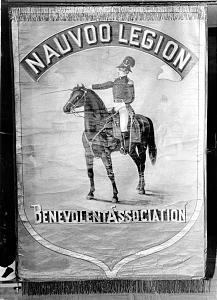
Banner carried during a Pioneer Day celebration in Utah ca 1903 by Dan Weggeland

The Mormon Battalion was a US military unit during the Mexican–American War formed in 1846 of 500 Mormon volunteers, many of whom had served in the Nauvoo Legion.

Many Mormon Battalion members would go on to become leaders in the Utah Territorial Militia organized in 1852 by the Provisional State of Deseret and the Territory of Utah law. This force was called the Nauvoo Legion interchangeably, out of respect to their heritage.

The Nauvoo Legion in Utah participated in the Black Hawk War and the Walker War.

On April 1, 1857 the Nauvoo Legion in Utah was reorganized, dividing the Utah Territory into thirteen military districts, in preparation to battle against the United States in the Utah War. In September the Iron County district (which included several former members of the Illinois Nauvoo Legion) participated in the Mountain Meadows Massacre.

Two cavalry units of the Nauvoo Legion were used by the federal government to protect mail and freight lines during the Civil War.

In 1887 the Nauvoo Legion in Utah was disbanded by the Edmunds–Tucker Act.

== Weapons and equipment ==
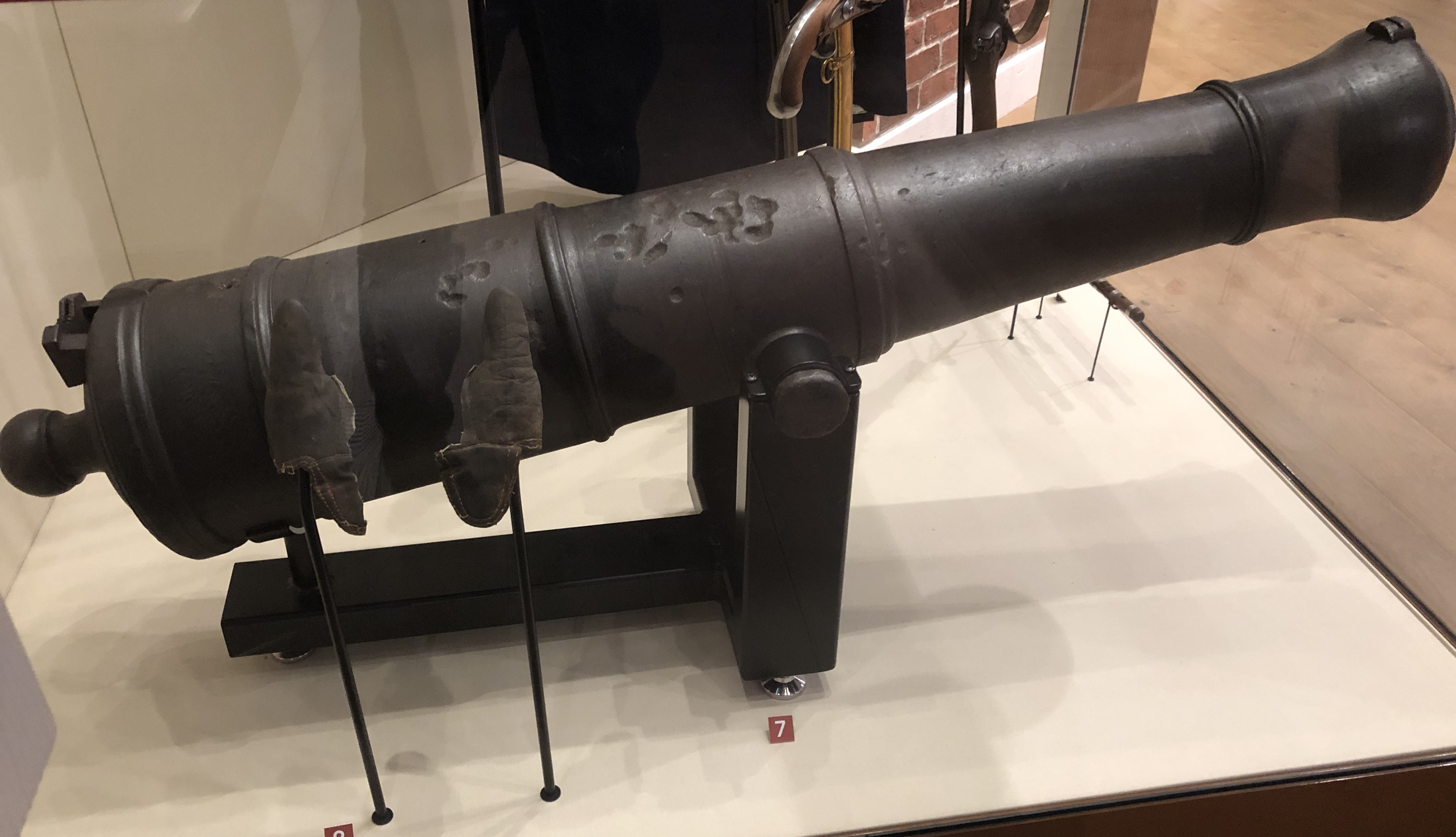
12-Pound Carronade located at the Church History Museum. Used by the Nauvoo Legion in Nauvoo.

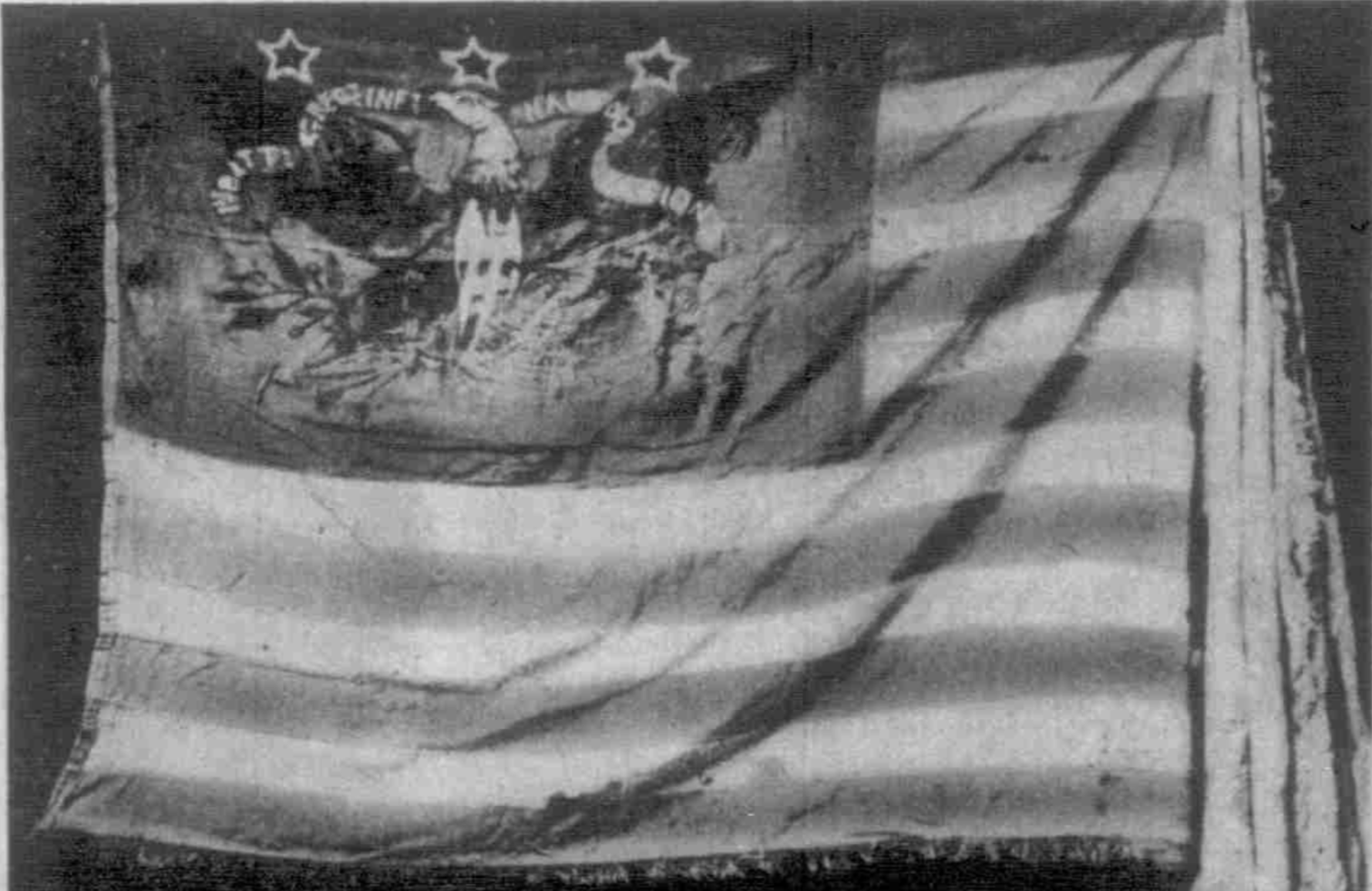
Unique American flag carried by the 3rd infantry regiment from 1840-1866.

Records are sparse regarding military readiness of the Nauvoo Legion in terms of uniforms, equipment, discipline, and armaments, making an accurate state difficult to ascertain.

As was common among militias at the time, members were generally equipped with personally owned firearms. Its estimated the state of Illinois provided the Legion with three pieces of cannon, and around 250 small arms. While it is unknown what type of rifles were issued, it was most likely Model 1817 common rifle. An effort by Hosea Stout in September 1843 to obtain more from the state was unsuccessful. In 1989 a document surfaced detailing the personnel and materiel readiness of the second cohort as it stood early 1844. At that time the second cohort had been provided by the state 2 cannons, 4 pistols, 98 swords, 133 rifles and 6 muskets. After the destruction of the Nauvoo Expositor and subsequent arrest of Joseph Smith, the legion was ordered to return its state issued arms, and surrendered three pieces of cannon and 220 small arms.

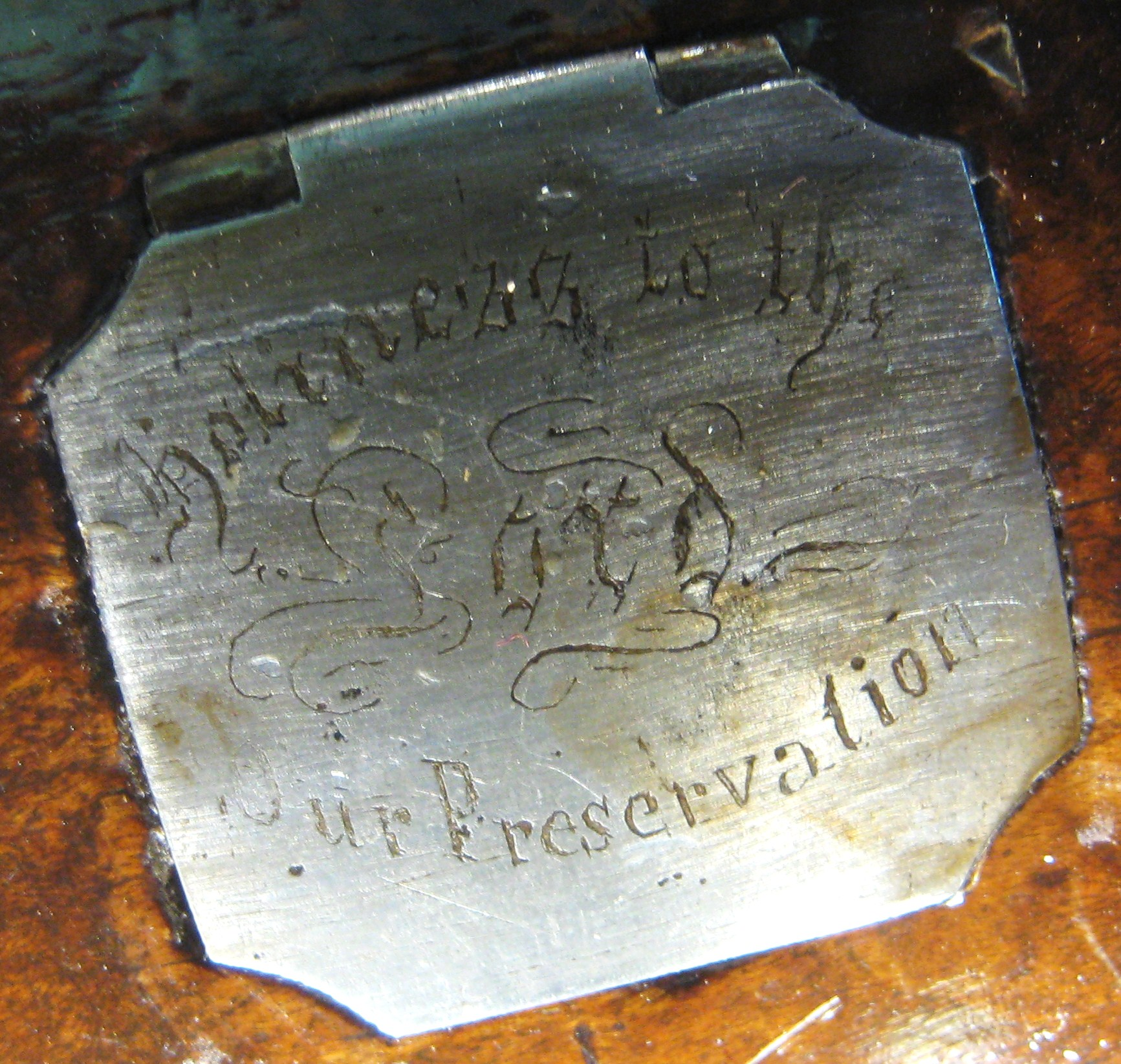
Plate on gun engraved with "Holiness to the Lord Our Preservation." Built by Nauvoo gunsmith Jonathan Browning between 1842–1846.

Nauvoo was home to a gunsmith shop run by inventor Jonathan Browning, who repaired and built guns for citizens of Nauvoo and surrounding region. Browning invented a harmonica rifle around 1844, that became a sought after model by local Latter Day Saints.

After the forced return of arms to the state, the church began to acquire arms that it referred to as "public arms". Brigham Young noted in his journal in September 1844 that "some arms and ammunition" had been received from St. Louis. Tithing money was used to purchase a six pound cannon in April 1845. Also in 1845 John Steele mentioned moving "forty stands of muskets" and a cannon "Old Sow" to the temple to be repaired. "Old Sow" was taken over the plains to Utah and is on display at the Church History Museum in Salt Lake City.

In October 1845 the Legion purchased 100 muskets. In November 1845 Orson Pratt used tithing money to purchase four hundred dollars' worth of Allen's revolving six shooter pistols (pepperboxes). William Hickman remembered in a memoir that there were four artillery pieces and five hundred stands of small arms. A 12-pound howitzer carronade, a ship cannon, was purchased by the Legion in Nauvoo, to go along with one three-pounder and two six-pounder cannons. At least one cannon was drilled out by John Kay. For the final battle of Nauvoo five cannons were made out of hollow steamboat shafts.

== See also ==
- Utah Territorial Militia
- Army of the Republic of Texas
- California Republic (Bear Flaggers)
- Green Mountain Boys
- Nauvoo Brass Band
- Texas Navy
- Texian Army
- Utah Army National Guard
- Zion's Camp
