= William N. Grover =

American lawyer (1817–1899)

William N. Grover (July 17, 1817 – August 25, 1899) was an American judge and United States Attorney for the eastern district of Missouri. He was one of five defendants tried and acquitted in Illinois for the murder in 1844 of Joseph Smith, founder of the Latter Day Saint movement.

== Murder trial ==
Joseph Smith and his brother Hyrum Smith had been killed by an armed mob during their imprisonment in Carthage Jail on June 27, 1844. As a captain in command of the Warsaw Cadets in the Illinois militia, Grover was accused of having ordered his men to storm the jail and attack the Smiths. Grover had been a leader of the Anti-Mormon Party in Hancock County. At trial, a jury acquitted Grover and four other defendants (Note: Thomas C. Sharp, Mark Aldrich, Jacob C. Davis, and Levi Williams.) of the murders.

== Law practice ==
In 1852, after an unsuccessful bid for election to the Illinois General Assembly, Grover moved from Hancock County, Illinois to St. Louis, Missouri. In 1863 he was appointed as a United States Attorney for the eastern district of Missouri. By 1871, he had moved back to Warsaw, Illinois, where he lived until his death in 1899.
