= William Grover =

William Grover may refer to:

- William N. Grover, American attorney acquitted of murdering Joseph Smith, Jr.
- William Grover-Williams (born William Charles Frederick Grover), British-French racing driver and World War II spy
