= Daniel Avery =

Daniel Avery may refer to:

- Daniel Avery (politician) (1766–1842), American politician from New York
- Daniel Avery (Latter Day Saints) (1798–1851), American Mormon leader
- Daniel Avery (musician) (born 1986), English electronic musician
