= Daniel Avery (Latter Day Saints) =

Early Mormon leader

Daniel Avery (July 1, 1798 – October 16, 1851) was an early leader in the Latter Day Saint movement and was a leader of the Church of Jesus Christ of Latter Day Saints (Strangite) after the succession crisis of 1844.

== Background ==
Avery was born at Edson Corners, Oswego, New York, on 1 July 1797. The date of his baptism into the early Latter Day Saint church is unknown, but he was present with the Latter Day Saints in Missouri when they began to be driven out of that state in 1838. In December 1839, movement founder Joseph Smith called on Avery to organize a quorum of elders in Montrose, Iowa. On January 4, 1840, Avery was ordained president of the elders quorum in Montrose by Abraham O. Smoot.

On December 2, 1843, Avery was kidnapped at Bear Creek Precinct, Hancock County, Illinois, by a group which included Levi Williams, John Elliott, and others, who accused him of stealing a horse and colt about four years earlier. Avery spent several weeks in a Missouri prison at Monticello, Lewis County, Missouri, but was released on December 25 after a successful habeas corpus petition.

After the death of Joseph Smith, Avery became one of the carpenters charged with finishing the construction of the Nauvoo Temple. When Brigham Young announced that he would lead the Latter Day Saints to the Salt Lake Valley, Avery chose instead to follow the leadership of James J. Strang, who was gathering Latter Day Saints in Voree, Wisconsin. From 1846 to 1848, Avery was a member of the high council at Voree for Strang's Church of Jesus Christ of Latter Day Saints.

Avery died on 16 October 1851 at Camden, Illinois.
