= Levi Williams =

American minister and militia officer (1794-1860)

Levi Williams (1794–1860) was an American Baptist minister and a member of the Illinois militia. He was active in opposing the presence of the Latter Day Saints in Hancock County, Illinois, during the 1840s. He is one of five defendants who were tried and acquitted of the 1844 murder of Joseph Smith, founder of the Latter Day Saint movement.

In the early 1830s, Williams, his wife (Mary "Polly" Reid), and three sons John Reid Williams, Henry Clay Williams and Rice Williams moved from Kentucky to Hancock County, Illinois. Southeast of Warsaw, in Green Plains, Williams became a farmer and a cooper. He also occasionally worked as a Baptist minister. Williams served as a county commissioner to establish roads.

In 1835, he was commissioned a captain in the 59th Regiment of the Illinois militia and in 1840 was commissioned colonel and commanding officer of the same regiment. Williams was a veteran of the War of 1812, and was the son of a veteran of the American Revolutionary War who served in Virginia.

When Latter Day Saints began settling in Hancock County in the late 1830s and early 1840s, Williams became a fierce opponent of their presence. In 1843, Williams led a militia that captured Mormon Daniel Avery and his son and threatened them with guns and knives before releasing them in Missouri.

== Murder trial ==
After Joseph Smith and his brother Hyrum were killed at Carthage Jail on June 27, 1844, Williams was accused of having ordered his 59th Regiment to take part in the storming of the jail. At trial, Williams and four other defendants were acquitted of the murders by a jury.

According to "Wild Bill" Hickman, Williams told him that because the Mormons "ruled the county [and] elected whom they pleased ... the old settlers had no chance". Killing the Smiths, Williams claimed, "was the only way they could get rid of them."

Williams served as postmaster of Green Plains, Illinois, after his acquittal. He died of a stroke on November 20, 1860, at his farm in Green Plains. Previously a member of the Whig Party, Williams joined the Republican Party before his death.
