= Thomas C. Sharp =

American journalist (1818–1894)

Thomas C. Sharp

Thomas Coke Sharp (September 25, 1818 – April 9, 1894) was a prominent opponent of Joseph Smith and the Latter Day Saints in Illinois in the 1840s. Sharp promoted his anti-Mormon views largely through the Warsaw Signal newspaper, of which he was the owner, editor, and publisher. Sharp was one of five defendants tried and acquitted of the murders of Smith and his brother Hyrum.

== Early life ==
Sharp was born in Mount Holly Township, New Jersey, the son of prominent Methodist preacher Solomon Sharp. He attended Dickinson College in Carlisle, Pennsylvania, and was admitted to the legal bar of Cumberland County, Illinois, in April 1840. However, Sharp was partially deaf, which made it difficult for him to function in courtrooms. He gave up his Illinois legal practice after a few months.

== Warsaw Signal and anti-Mormonism ==
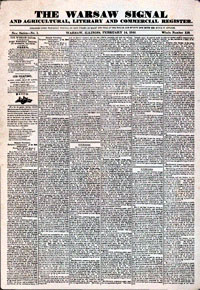

Sharp moved to Warsaw, Illinois, in September 1840. Approximately 18 months earlier, Latter Day Saints had begun to arrive in the same county and settle in the town of Commerce, which by 1840 had been renamed Nauvoo. In November, Sharp and a business partner purchased a Warsaw newspaper entitled Western World, which they renamed Warsaw Signal in 1841. Sharp used the paper to promote his opposition to the Mormon presence in Hancock County.

Within a few months, "Old Tom Sharp," as he was called, had become an opponent of the Latter Day Saints. Sharp and some associates formed the Anti-Mormon Party to oppose Mormon influences in Hancock County. Sharp also opposed non-Mormons who assisted or were sympathetic to the Latter Day Saints, dubbing them "Jack Mormons". Due to financial losses, Sharp was forced to sell the Signal to its original owner in 1842.

In 1842, Sharp ran as a candidate for the Hancock County seat in the Illinois House of Representatives as a representative of the Whig Party. His principal opponent was William Smith, a Mormon apostle who ran for the Democratic Party. Smith won the election easily as a result of overwhelming support from Mormon voters in Nauvoo.

In February 1844, Sharp resumed ownership of the Warsaw Signal. The Signal was vigorously anti-Mormon in its editorial stance. In a June 11, 1844 editorial, Sharp wrote:

War and extermination is inevitable! Citizens ARISE, ONE and ALL!!!—Can you stand by, and suffer such INFERNAL DEVILS! to ROB men of their property and RIGHTS, without avenging them. We have no time for comment, every man will make his own. LET IT BE MADE WITH POWDER AND BALL!!!

In a June 14, 1844, extra edition, the Signal published the minutes of a meeting of Warsaw residents organized by Sharp; those in attendance condemned Smith's destruction of the printing press of the anti-Mormon Nauvoo Expositor and resolved that "the Prophet [Smith] and his miscreant adherents, should ... be demanded at their [the Latter Day Saints'] hands, and if not surrendered, a war of extermination should be waged to the entire destruction, if necessary for our protection, of his adherents."

Joseph Smith and his brother Hyrum were arrested and jailed on charges of destruction of the presses of the Nauvoo Expositor. They were killed at the jail by a mob on June 27, 1844.

Sharp editorialized in the July 10 edition:

Joe and Hiram [sic] Smith, at the time their lives were taken, were in the custody of the officers of the law; and it is asked by those who condemn the act, why the law was not first allowed to take its course before violence was resorted to? We answr [sic] that the course of law in the case of these wretches would have been a mere mockery; and such was the conviction of every sensible man.

== Arrest and trial ==
On September 25, 1844, a deputy sheriff attempted to arrest Sharp as a suspect in the murders of Joseph and Hyrum Smith. Sharp refused to go with the sheriff, arguing that his fellow citizens of Warsaw would not want him to surrender. Two days later, Illinois governor Thomas Ford issued a proclamation offering a reward of two hundred dollars for the arrest of Sharp. Soon afterward, Sharp crossed the Mississippi River and went into hiding in Alexandria, Missouri.

By October 1, Sharp agreed to surrender on condition that he would be tried at Quincy, Illinois, as opposed to Nauvoo, and that the governor would instruct the courts to release Sharp on bail pending his trial. The next day, Sharp was indicted for the murders and released on $2000 (about $81,250.00, in 2023) bail. At trial, Sharp and four other accused persons were acquitted by a jury of the murders of the Smiths.

== Later life ==
Sharp gave up ownership and editorship of the Warsaw Signal in 1846. He was an elected delegate to the Illinois state constitutional convention in 1847 and was elected to three successive terms as the mayor of Warsaw beginning in 1853. He ran unsuccessfully as a Republican candidate for an Illinois seat in the U.S. House of Representatives in 1856. In 1865, Sharp was elected as a judge in Hancock County. Later, he served as a school principal and eventually returned to the newspaper publishing business with ownership of the Carthage Gazette. He died in Carthage, Illinois, at the age of 75.
