= Warsaw Signal =

American newspaper

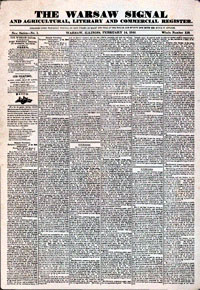
- Publisher: David N. White, 1840; Sharp & Gamble, 1840–1842; Gregg & Skinner, 1843–1844; Sharp and Head, 1844–1845; Sharp & Galloway, 1845–1850; Th. Gregg, 1851–1853
- Founded: 1840
- Political alignment: Whig
- Language: English
- Headquarters: Warsaw, Illinois, USA
- OCLC number: 11423480

The Warsaw Signal was a newspaper edited and published in Warsaw, Illinois during the 1840s and early 1850s. For most of its history, the Signal's editorial stance was one of vigorous anti-Mormonism and the advancement of the policies of the Whig Party.

== Names and incarnations ==
The newspaper was founded as the Western World, with its first edition published on May 13, 1840. In its May 12, 1841 edition, noting that Western World was a title that was "too extensive in its signification", the paper, which had been purchased by Thomas C. Sharp, changed its name to Warsaw Signal. On January 7, 1843, the name was changed to Warsaw Message after Sharp sold the newspaper, but on February 14, 1844 the name reverted to Warsaw Signal when it was repurchased by Sharp. In 1850, it was purchased by James McKee who renamed it Warsaw Commercial Journal. In 1855, McKee merged the Commercial Journal with the Journal of the People to create the Warsaw Express and Journal, which published until the late 1850s. In 1975, a new paper began publishing under the name Warsaw Signal, but its existence was short-lived.

== Anti-Mormonism ==
The Signal was vigorously anti-Mormon in its editorial stance. During the two separate periods of time when it bore the name Warsaw Signal, the owner and editor of the newspaper was Thomas C. Sharp, a leader in opposing Joseph Smith and the Latter Day Saint presence in Illinois. Upon hearing news of the city-ordered destruction of neighboring, Mormon-critical press Nauvoo Expositor with assistance from an armed pro-Mormon mob, Sharp editorialized:

War and extermination is inevitable! Citizens ARISE, ONE and ALL!!!—Can you stand by, and suffer such INFERNAL DEVILS! To ROB men of their property and RIGHTS, without avenging them. We have no time for comment, every man will make his own. LET IT BE MADE WITH POWDER AND BALL!!!

In a June 14, 1844 extra edition, the Signal published the minutes of a meeting of Warsaw residents organized by Sharp whereby those in attendance condemned Smith's destruction of the printing press of the Nauvoo Expositor and resolved that "the Prophet [Smith] and his miscreant adherents, should ... be demanded at their [the Latter Day Saints'] hands, and if not surrendered, a war of extermination should be waged to the entire destruction, if necessary for our protection, of his adherents."

After Smith and his brother Hyrum were killed by a mob on June 27, Sharp editorialized in the July 10 edition:

Joe and Hiram [sic] Smith, at the time their lives were taken, were in the custody of the officers of the law; and it is asked by those who condemn the act, why the law was not first allowed to take its course before violence was resorted to? We answer that the course of law in the case of these wretches would have been a mere mockery; and such was the conviction of every sensible man.

After the majority of the Latter Day Saints left Illinois under the leadership of Brigham Young, the Signal continued to report on the Mormons and their progression west and remained editorially opposed to the presence of Latter Day Saints in Illinois and surrounding states, particularly those who chose to follow James Strang.

== Mark Twain connection ==
Some literary historians have suggested that Mark Twain, then known by his birth name Samuel Langhorne Clemens, was a type-setter and contributor to the Warsaw Signal for a few weeks in late 1855 or early 1856. In a January 1856 edition of the newspaper, an article attributed to "Thomas Jefferson Sole" entitled "Learning Grammar" appeared on the fourth page of the publication. Historians have noted that the article resembles much of Twain's later writings and that Twain would later use the pseudonyms "Thomas Jefferson Snodgrass" and "Soleather" before settling on "Mark Twain".
