= Killing of Joseph Smith =

1844 assassination of Latter Day Saint founder in Carthage, Illinois

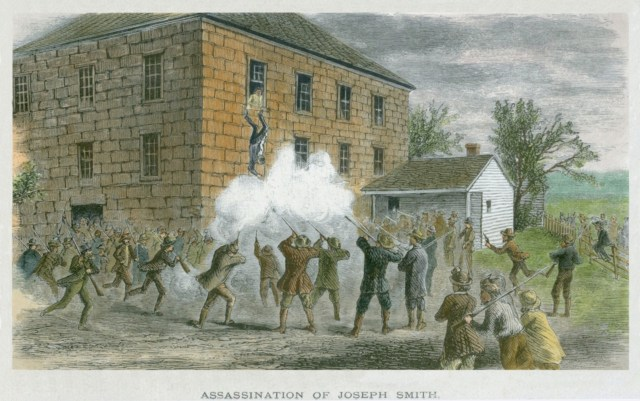
- Location: Carthage, Illinois, U.S.
- Date: June 27, 1844; 182 years ago
- Target: Joseph and Hyrum Smith
- Attack type: Assassination by shooting
- Weapon: Firearms
- Deaths: 2 (Joseph and Hyrum Smith)
- Injuries: 4 (John Taylor and three mobs)
- Perpetrator: Anti-Mormon mobs
- No. of participants: 150–200
- Defenders: Thomas C. Sharp, Mark Aldrich, William N. Grover, Jacob C. Davis, Levi Williams
- Motive: see below
- Accused: 5
- Verdict: Acquitted

Joseph Smith, the founder and leader of the Latter Day Saint movement, and his brother, Hyrum Smith, were killed by a mob in Carthage, Illinois, United States, on June 27, 1844, while awaiting trial in the town jail on charges of treason.

As a result of the 1838 Mormon War and a state executive order by Missouri Governor Lilburn Boggs, a large group of Mormons, including Smith and his brother, had to flee Missouri. In 1839, the group settled in Commerce, Illinois, where Smith soon became mayor and which he renamed Nauvoo.

In 1844, a group of ex-Mormons who opposed polygamy and who had recently been excommunicated from the Church of Jesus Christ of Latter Day Saints established the Nauvoo Expositor newspaper. On June 7, 1844, the newspaper published its first (and only) issue, which criticized Smith and other church leaders, reporting that Smith was practicing polygamy, marrying the wives of other men, teaching a "plurality of Gods", and alleging that he intended to set himself up as a theocratic king. After a vote of the Nauvoo City Council, Smith, as mayor, ordered the Expositor's printing press destroyed.

The destruction of the press led to broader public outrage in the communities surrounding the city. The Smith brothers and other members of the Nauvoo City Council were charged by the state of Illinois with inciting a riot. Joseph Smith was apprehended, but freed by the Nauvoo municipal court. Smith declared martial law and called for the Nauvoo Legion to help keep the peace. After failing and briefly fleeing Illinois, Smith received a personal statement from the governor of Illinois, Thomas Ford, who "pledged his faith and the faith of the state (Illinois) to protect him while he underwent a legal and fair trial", convincing Smith and Hyrum to return to Illinois and face trial voluntarily. When the brothers arrived at the county seat of Carthage to surrender to authorities, they were charged with treason against Illinois for declaring martial law.

The Smith brothers were detained at Carthage Jail awaiting trial when an armed mob of 150–200 men stormed the building, their faces painted black with wet gunpowder. Hyrum was killed almost immediately when he was shot in the face, shouting as he fell, "I am a dead man!" After emptying his pistol towards the attackers, Joseph tried to escape from a second-story window, but was shot several times and fell to the ground, where he was again shot by the mob.

Five men were indicted for the killings, but all were acquitted at a jury trial. At the time of his death, Smith was also running for president of the United States, making him the first U.S. presidential candidate to be assassinated. Smith's death marked a turning point for the Latter Day Saint movement.

== Background ==
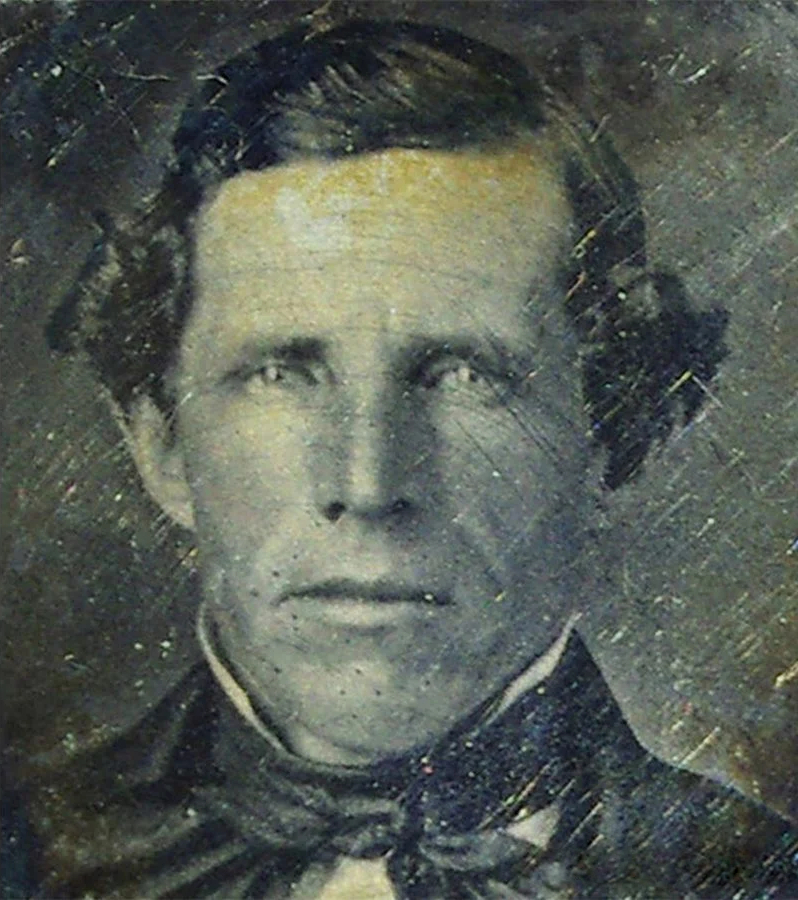
Alleged daguerreotype of Joseph Smith, c. 1844

In 1830, Joseph Smith, aged 24, published the Book of Mormon, which he described as an English translation of ancient golden plates he received from an angel. The same year he organized the Church of Christ, calling it a restoration of the early Christian Church. Members of the church were later called "Latter Day Saints" or "Mormons". Smith and his followers sought to assemble together in a theocratic community under Smith's leadership, or "Zion", first in Kirtland, Ohio, and later in Independence, Missouri.

In 1833, a mob of settlers attacked a Mormon newspaper's printing office, destroyed the press, and tarred and feathered two Mormon leaders. Mormons were violently driven from Jackson county. After losing the 1838 Mormon War, Smith was jailed and his followers were forced out of Missouri.

After Smith escaped custody, he fled to Illinois, where he founded a new settlement that he named Nauvoo, then traveling on to Washington, D.C., to meet with President Martin Van Buren, seeking intervention and compensation for lost property. Van Buren said he could do nothing to help. Smith returned to Illinois and vowed to join the Whig Party. Most of his supporters switched with him to the Whig party, adding political tensions to the social suspicions in which Smith's followers were held by the local populace.

=== Polygamy divides Smith's followers ===
Despite public denials of polygamy, Joseph Smith had a practice of secretly being sealed to his female followers. As early as 1838, Smith had faced accusations of polygamy. On April 18, anti-polygamists William Law, Wilson Law, Jane Law, and Robert Foster were excommunicated. On May 10, a prospectus announcing the Expositor was circulated.

On May 23, a grand jury from the Hancock County Circuit Court issued a criminal indictment against Smith on the charges of perjury based on the statements of Joseph Jackson and Robert Foster. A second indictment, for "fornication and adultery", was issued based on the statements of William and Wilson Law who swore Smith had been living with Maria Lawrence "in an open state of adultery" since the prior October 12.

=== Destruction of the Nauvoo Expositor ===
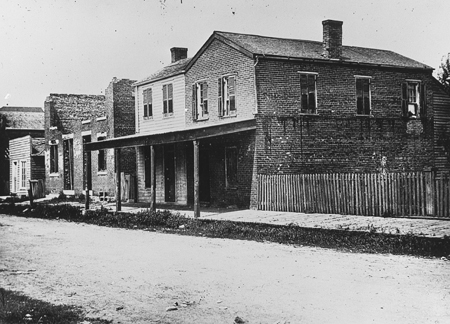
The Nauvoo Expositor building in Nauvoo, Illinois.

In 1844, in the city of Nauvoo, Illinois, where Smith was mayor, several anti-polygamist Mormons, recently excommunicated from Smith's church, joined to publish a newspaper called the Nauvoo Expositor. It put out its first and only issue on June 7, 1844. Based on sworn statements, the Expositor alleged that Smith practiced polygamy, marrying at least eight other men's wives, and he had tried to marry the wives of some of the Expositor's publishers.

In response to public outrage generated by the Expositor, the Nauvoo City Council passed an ordinance declaring the newspaper a public nuisance which had been designed to promote violence against Smith and his followers. They reached this decision after some discussion, including citation of William Blackstone's legal canon, which defined a libelous press as a public nuisance. According to the council's minutes, Smith said he "would rather die tomorrow and have the thing smashed, than live and have it go on, for it was exciting the spirit of mobocracy among the people, and bringing death and destruction upon us."

Under the council's new ordinance, Smith, as Nauvoo's mayor, in conjunction with the council, ordered the city marshal to destroy the Expositor and its printing press on June 10, 1844. By the city marshal's account, the destruction of the press type was carried out orderly and peaceably. However, Charles A. Foster, a co-publisher of the Expositor, reported on June 12 that not only was the printing press destroyed, but that "several hundred minions ... injured the building very materially".

Smith's critics said that the action of destroying the press violated freedom of the press. Some sought legal charges against Smith for the destruction of the press, including charges of treason and inciting a riot. Violent threats were made against Smith and the Latter Day Saints. On June 12, Thomas C. Sharp, editor of the Warsaw Signal in Warsaw, Illinois, a newspaper hostile to the church, editorialized:

War and extermination is inevitable! Citizens ARISE, ONE and ALL!!!—Can you stand by, and suffer such INFERNAL DEVILS! To ROB men of their property and RIGHTS, without avenging them. We have no time for comment, every man will make his own. LET IT BE MADE WITH POWDER AND BALL!!!

=== Arrest attempt and martial law ===
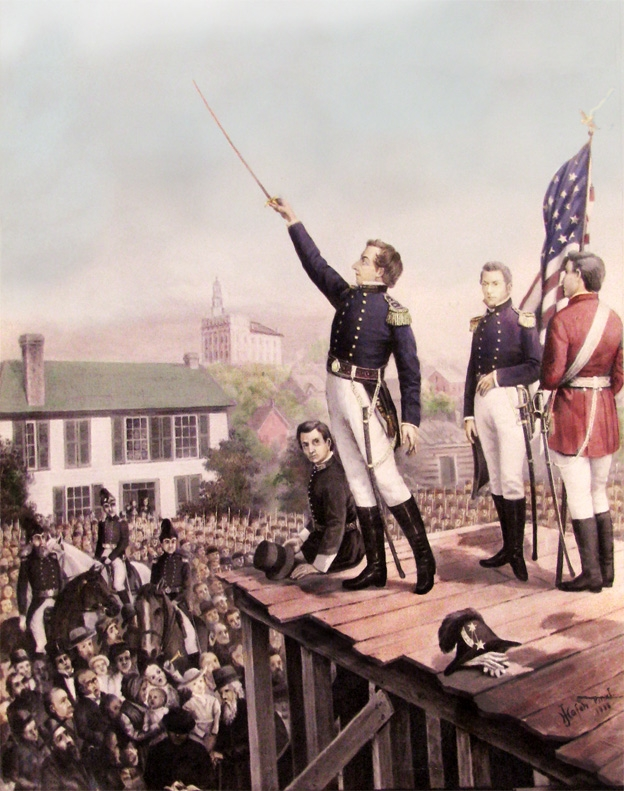
Lt. General Joseph Smith's last public address was to the Nauvoo Legion.

Warrants from outside Nauvoo were brought in against Smith for the charge of riot. On June 12, Smith was arrested by David Bettinger, constable of Carthage. Bettinger sought to convey Smith to the Hancock County Court that issued the warrant, but Smith was freed when the charges were dismissed in Nauvoo municipal court on a writ of habeas corpus. Smith declared martial law on June 18 and called out the Nauvoo Legion, an organized city militia of about 5,000 men, to protect Nauvoo from outside violence.

In response to the crisis, Illinois governor Thomas Ford traveled to Hancock County, and on June 21 he arrived at the county seat in Carthage. On June 22, Ford wrote to Smith and the Nauvoo City Council, proposing a trial by a non-Mormon jury in Carthage and guaranteeing Smith's safety. Smith fled the jurisdiction to avoid arrest, crossing the Mississippi River into the Iowa Territory. On June 23, a posse under Ford's command entered Nauvoo to execute an arrest warrant, but they were unable to locate Smith.

=== Smith surrenders ===
After briefly fleeing Illinois, Smith received a personal statement from Governor Ford, who "pledged his faith and the faith of the state (Illinois) to protect him while he underwent a legal and fair trial", convincing Joseph Smith along with Hyrum to return voluntarily. He was reported to have said, "If my life is of no value to my friends it is of none to myself." He reluctantly submitted to arrest. He was quoted as saying, "I am going like a lamb to the slaughter; but I am calm as a summer's morning; I have a conscience void of offense towards God, and towards all men. I shall die innocent, and it shall yet be said of me—he was murdered in cold blood." During the trip to Carthage, Smith reportedly recounted a dream in which he and Hyrum escaped a burning ship, walked on water, and arrived at a great heavenly city. On June 25, 1844, Smith and his brother Hyrum, along with the other fifteen Council members and some friends, surrendered to Carthage constable William Bettisworth on the original charge of riot. Upon arrival in Carthage, almost immediately the Smith brothers were charged with treason against the State of Illinois for declaring martial law in Nauvoo, by a warrant founded upon the oaths of A. O. Norton and Augustine Spencer. At a preliminary hearing that afternoon, the Council members were released on $500 bonds, pending later trial. The judge ordered the Smith brothers to be held in jail until they could be tried for treason, which was a capital offense.

=== Incarceration at Carthage Jail ===
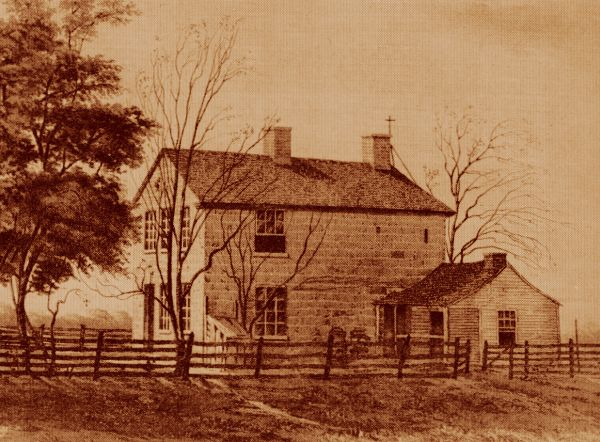
An etching of the Carthage Jail, c. 1885

The Smith brothers were detained at Carthage Jail, and were soon joined by Willard Richards, John Taylor and John S. Fullmer. Six other associates accompanied the Smiths: John P. Greene, Stephen Markham, Dan Jones, John S. Fullmer, Dr. Southwick, and Lorenzo D. Wasson.

Ford left for Nauvoo not long after Smith was jailed. The anti-Mormon "Carthage Greys", a local militia, were assigned to protect the brothers. Jones, who was present, relayed to Ford several threats against Joseph made by members of the Greys, all of which were dismissed by Ford.

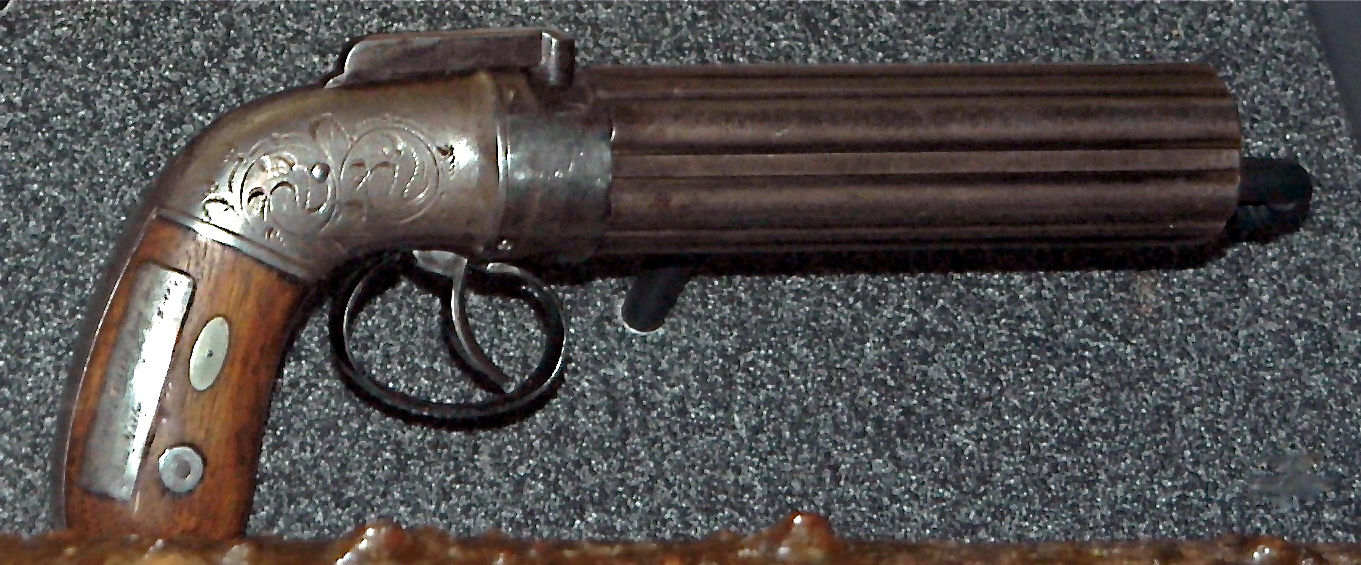
This smuggled gun was used by Smith to shoot Wills, Vorhease, and Gallaher.

On Thursday morning, June 27, church leader Cyrus Wheelock, having obtained a pass from Ford, visited Smith in jail. The day was rainy, and Wheelock used the opportunity to hide a small pepper-box pistol in his bulky overcoat, which had belonged to Taylor. Most visitors were rigidly searched, but the guards forgot to check Wheelock's overcoat, and he was able to smuggle the gun to Smith. Smith took Wheelock's gun and gave Fullmer's gun to his brother Hyrum.

== Attack ==
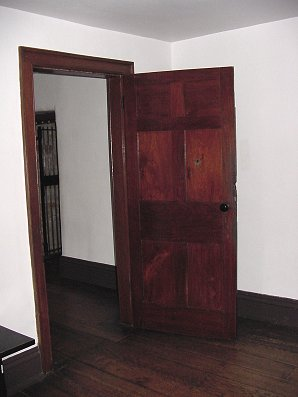
The mob shot a bullet hole through the door in Carthage Jail.

Before a trial could be held, a mob of about 200 armed men, their faces painted black with wet gunpowder, stormed Carthage Jail in the late afternoon of June 27, 1844. Early on June 27, Smith authored an order to Nauvoo Legion commander Jonathan Dunham instructing him to bring the Legion to Carthage and stage a jailbreak. In a final letter to his wife, Smith wrote "I just learn[ed] that the Governor is about to disband his troops, all but a guard to protect us ... This is right as I suppose." Smith and the other prisoners were guarded only by six members of the Carthage Grays, led by Sgt. Frank Worrell.

A division of militia began marching away from Carthage, but soon received orders from the Governor to disband. Learning that the Governor had dismissed the troops, a group from Warsaw set out to Carthage to see the Governor. En route, a messenger informed the group that the Governor had gone to Nauvoo and "there is nobody in Carthage [that] you can [depend on]". When the group approached the building, jailers became alarmed, but Smith, mistaking the mob for the Nauvoo Legion, told a jailer: "Don't trouble yourself ... they've come to rescue me." Smith did not know that Jonathan Dunham, major general of the Nauvoo Legion, had not dispatched the unit to Carthage to protect him. Allen Joseph Stout later contended that by remaining inactive, Dunham disobeyed an official order written by Smith after he was jailed in Carthage.

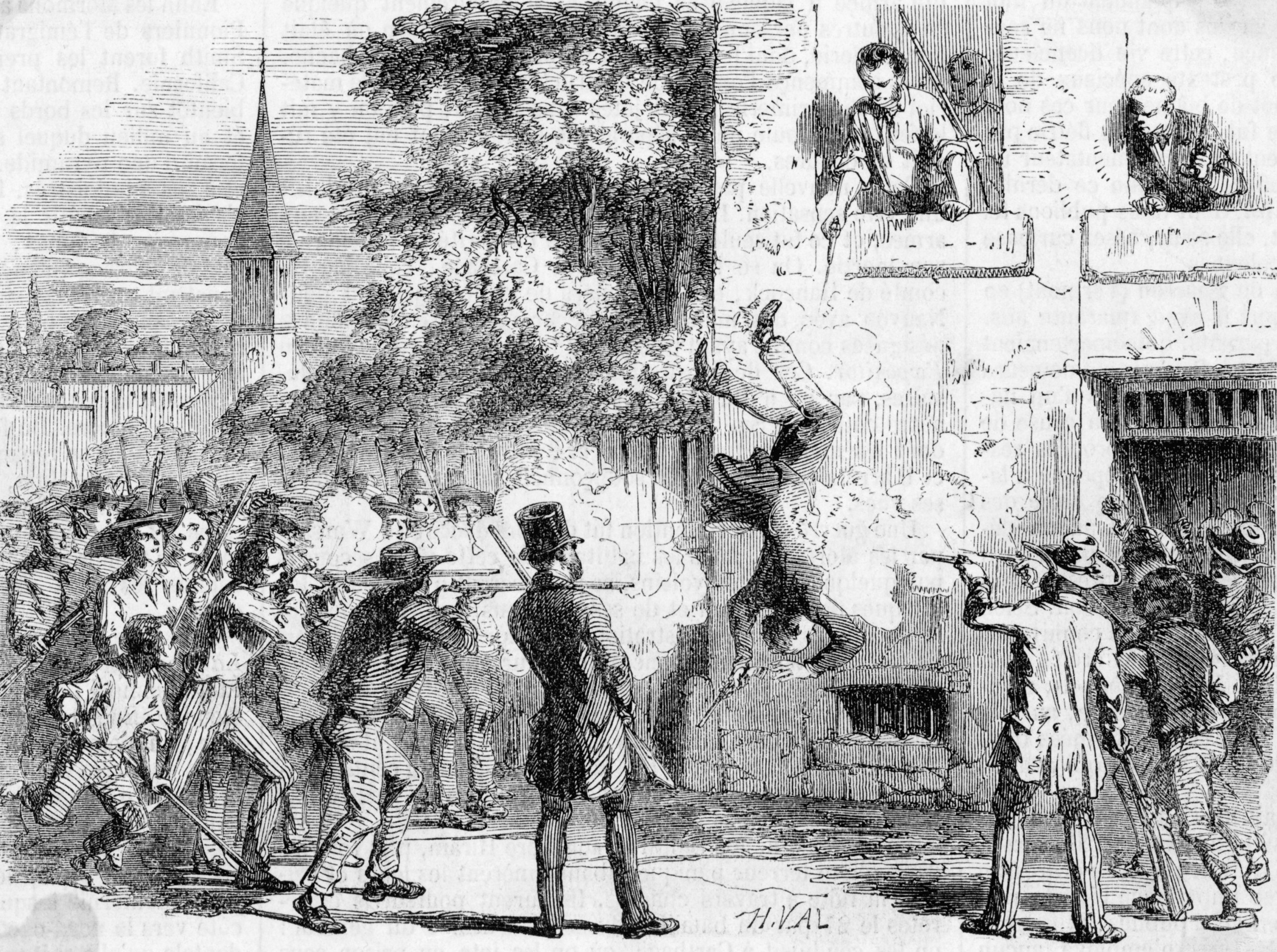
Hit by a ball, Smith fell from the second story window.

The Carthage Greys reportedly feigned defense of the jail by firing shots or blanks over the attackers' heads, and some of the Greys even reportedly joined the mob, who rushed up the stairs. The mob first attempted to push the door open to fire into the room, though Smith and the other prisoners pushed back and prevented this. A member of the mob fired a shot through the door. Hyrum was shot in the face, just to the left of his nose, which threw him to the floor. He cried out, "I am a dead man!" and collapsed. He died immediately.

Smith, Taylor, and Richards attempted to defend themselves. Taylor and Richards used a long walking stick in order to deflect the guns as they were thrust inside the room, from behind the door. Smith fired Wheelock's pistol. Three of the six barrels misfired, but the other three shots are believed to have wounded three of the attackers.

Taylor was shot four or five times and was severely wounded, but survived. It has been popularly believed that his pocket watch stopped one shot. The watch is displayed in the LDS Church History Museum in Salt Lake City, Utah; the watch was broken and was used to help identify the time of the attack. In 2010, forensic research by J. Lynn Lyon of the University of Utah and Mormon historian Glen M. Leonard suggested that Taylor's watch was not struck by a ball, but rather broke against a window ledge. Columbia University historian Richard Bushman, the author of Joseph Smith: Rough Stone Rolling, also supports this view.

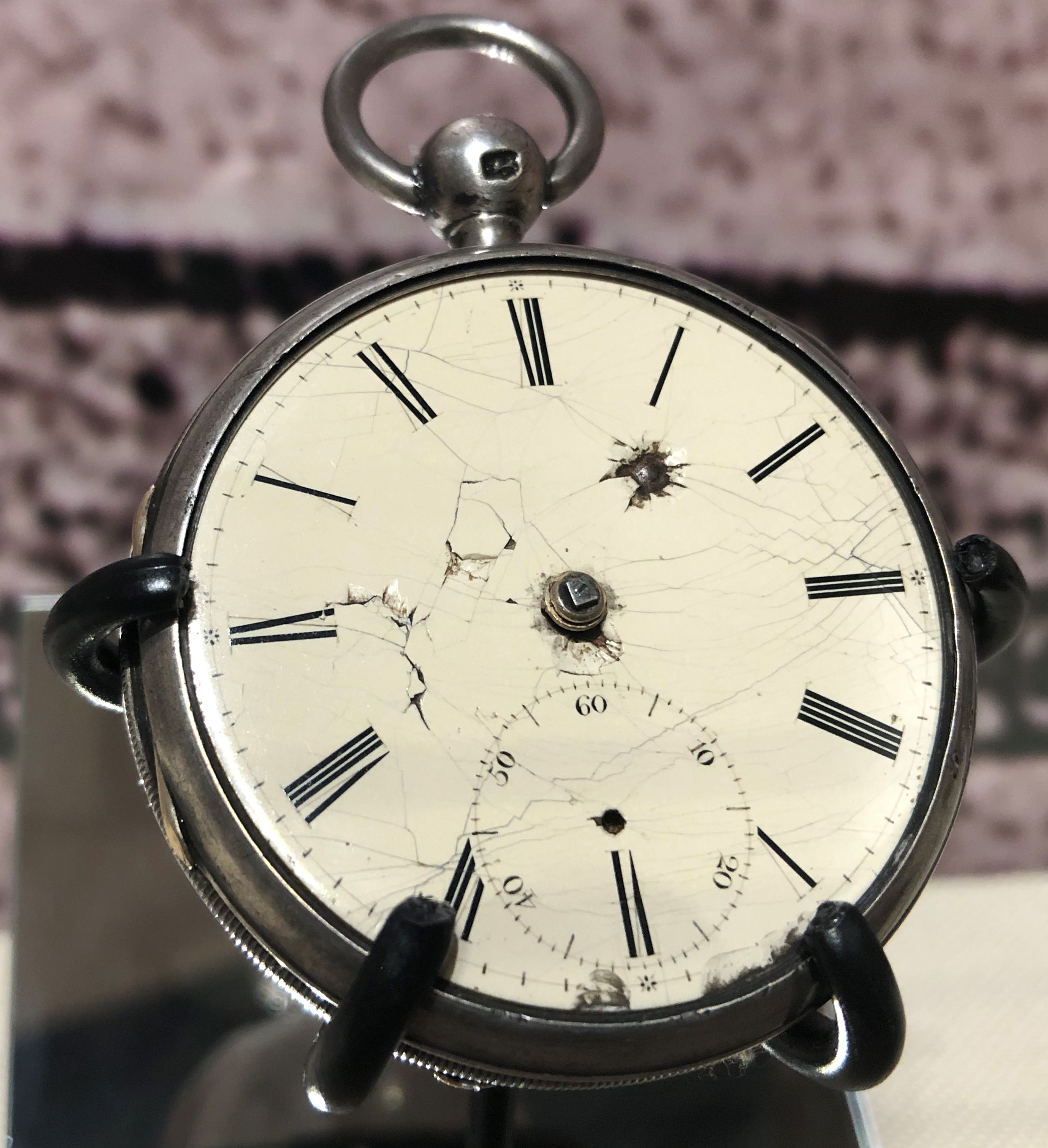
This pocket watch was worn by John Taylor during the killings of Joseph and Hyrum Smith.

Richards, physically the largest of Smith's party, escaped unscathed; Lyon speculates that after the door opened, Smith was in the line of sight and Richards was not targeted.

After using all of the shots in his pistol, Smith made his way towards the window. As he prepared to jump down, Richards reported that he was shot twice in the back and that a third bullet, fired from a musket on the ground outside, hit him in the chest. Taylor and Richards' accounts both report that as Smith fell from the window, he called out, "Oh Lord, my God!" Some have alleged that the context of this statement was an attempt by Smith to use a Masonic distress signal.

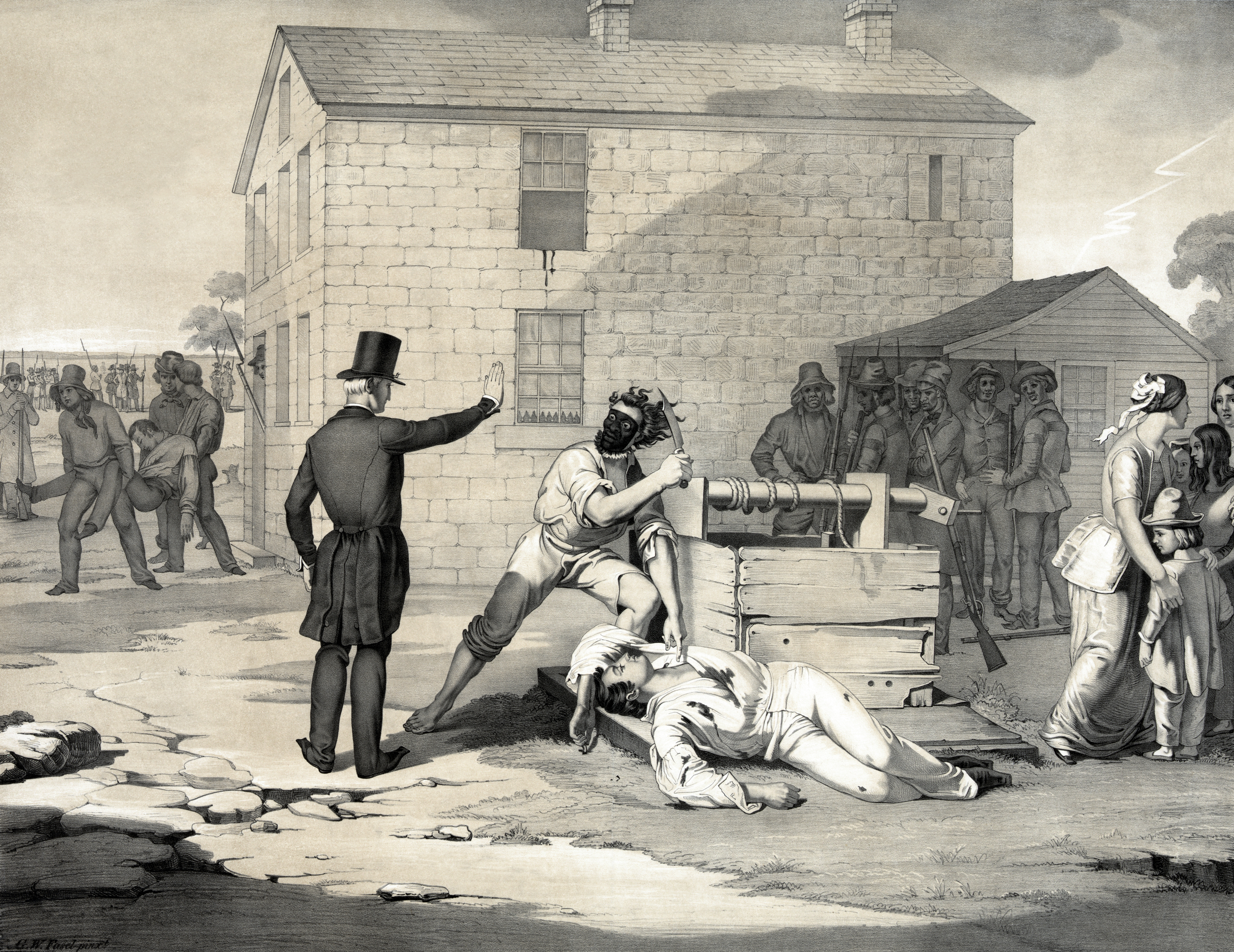
1851 lithograph of Smith's body being mutilated. (Library of Congress)

There are varying accounts of what happened next. Taylor and Richards' accounts state that Smith was dead when he hit the ground. Eyewitness William Daniels wrote in his 1845 account that Smith was still alive when members of the mob propped his body against a nearby well, assembled a makeshift firing squad, and shot him before fleeing. Daniels' account also states that one man tried to decapitate Smith for a bounty but was prevented by divine intervention, an affirmation later denied. Additional reports said that thunder and lightning frightened off the mob. Mob members fled, shouting, "The Mormons are coming," although there was no such force nearby.

After the attack was over, Richards, who was trained as a medical doctor, went back to see if anyone besides himself had survived, and found Taylor lying on the floor. Richards dragged Taylor into the jail cell (they had not been held in the cell, but in the guard's room across the hallway). He dragged Taylor under some of the straw mattress to put pressure on his wounds and slow the bleeding and then went to get help. Both Richards and Taylor survived. Taylor eventually became the third president of the Church of Jesus Christ of Latter-day Saints (LDS Church). Richards had escaped all harm except for a bullet grazing his ear.

Joseph and Hyrum's younger brother Samuel Harrison Smith had come to visit the same day and, after evading capture from a group of attackers, is said to have been the first Latter Day Saint to arrive and helped attend the bodies back to Nauvoo. He died thirty days later, possibly as a result of injuries sustained avoiding the mob.

=== Injuries to mob members ===
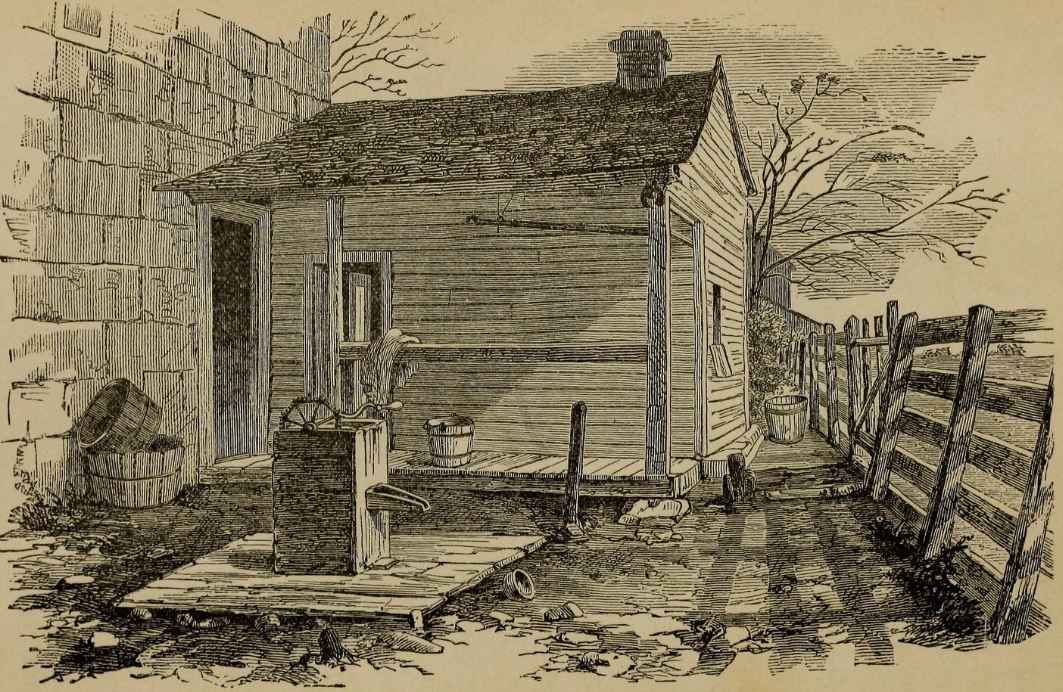
This side of Carthage Jail has the well, c. 1890.

There have been conflicting reports about injuries to members of the mob during the attack, and whether any died. Shortly after the events occurred, the account published by Daniels asserts that two of the attackers died when Smith shot them with his pistol. Most accounts seem to agree that at least three attackers were wounded by Smith's gunfire, but there is no other evidence that any of them died as a result. John Wills was shot in the arm, William Vorhease was shot in the shoulder, and William Gallaher was shot in the face. Others claimed that a fourth, unnamed man was also wounded. Wills, Vorhease, Gallaher, and a Mr. Allen (possibly the fourth man) were all indicted for the murder of the Smith brothers. Wills, Vorhease, and Gallaher, perhaps conscious that their wounds could prove that they were involved in the mob, fled the county after being indicted and were never brought to trial. Apart from Daniels' account, there is no evidence that Wills, Vorhease, Gallaher, or Allen died from their wounds.

== Interment ==
Joseph and Hyrum Smith's bodies were returned to Nauvoo the next day. The bodies were cleaned and examined, and death masks were made, preserving their facial features and structures.

A public viewing was held on June 29, 1844, after which empty coffins weighted with sandbags were used at the public burial to prevent theft or mutilation of the bodies. The coffins bearing the actual bodies of the Smith brothers were initially buried under the unfinished Nauvoo House, then disinterred and reburied deep under an out-building on the Smith homestead.

In 1928, Frederick M. Smith, president of the Reorganized Church of Jesus Christ of Latter Day Saints (RLDS) and grandson of Joseph Smith, feared that rising water from the Mississippi River would destroy the gravesite. He authorized civil engineer William O. Hands to conduct an excavation to find the Smiths' bodies. Hands conducted extensive digging on the Smith homestead and located the bodies, as well as the remains of Joseph's wife, Emma, who was buried in the same place. The remains—which were badly decomposed—were examined and photographed, and then reinterred close by in Nauvoo.

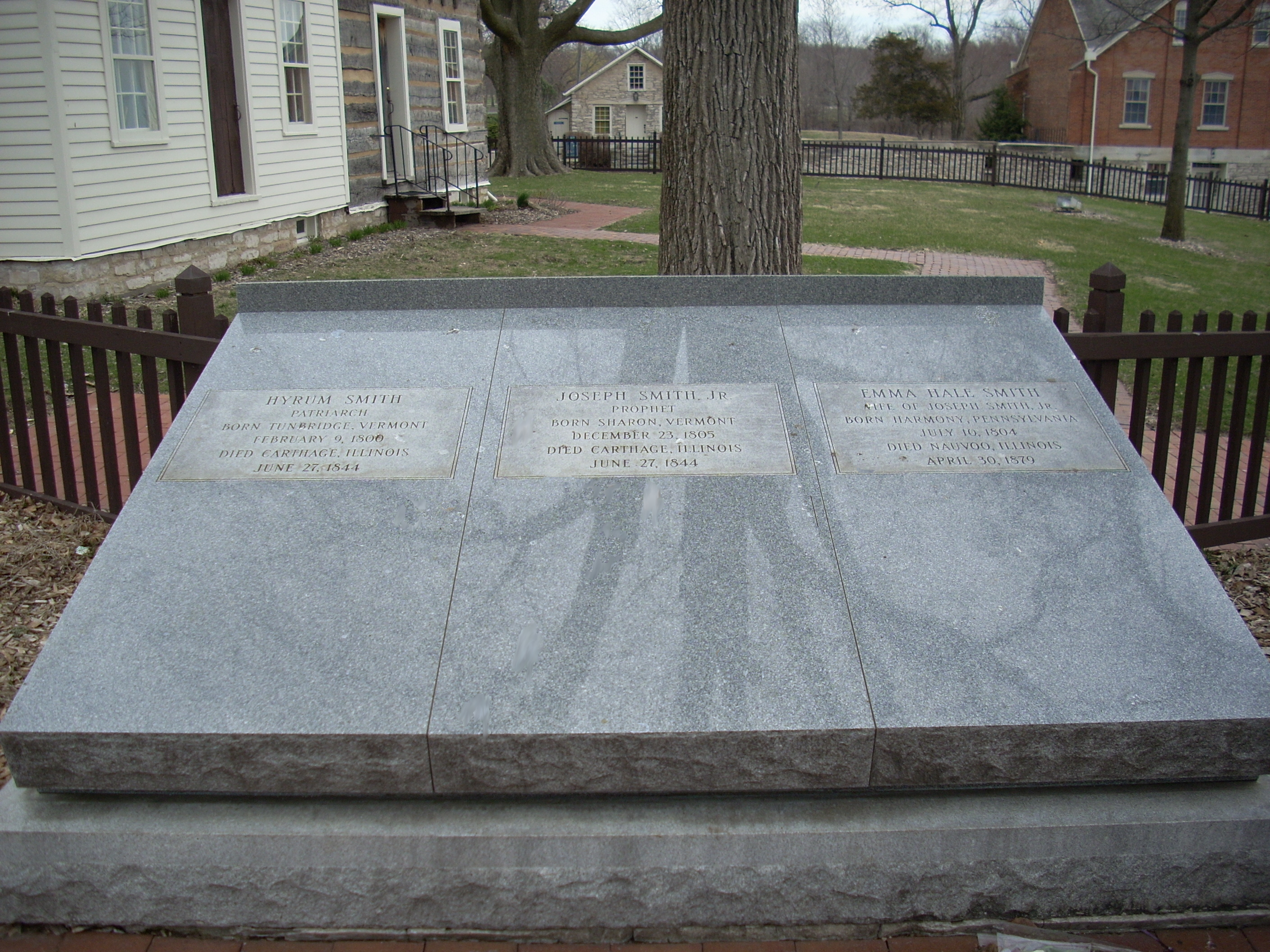
Current gravesite of Joseph, Hyrum, and Emma Smith

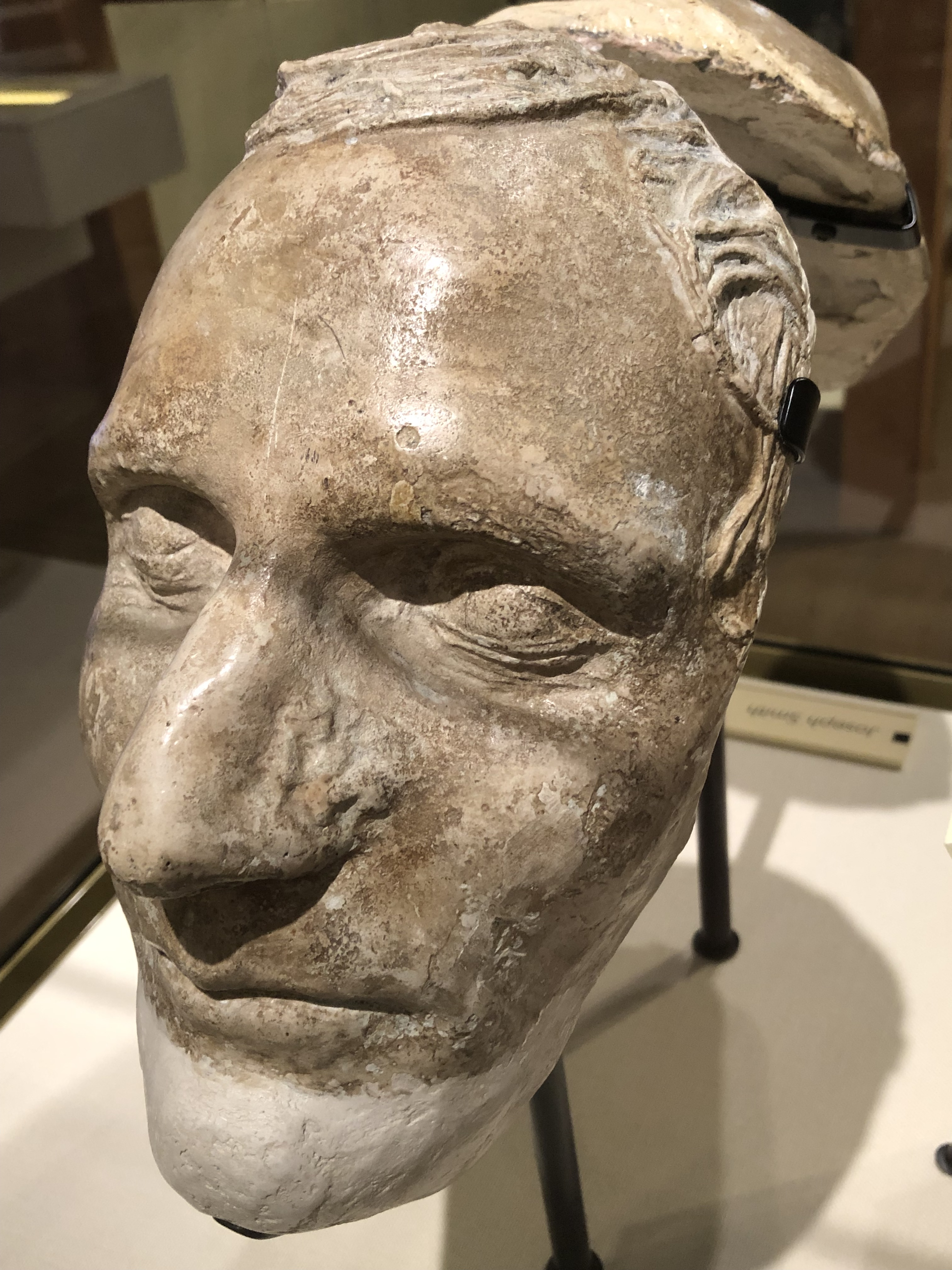
Hyrum Smith's death mask has a bullet hole to the left of his nose.

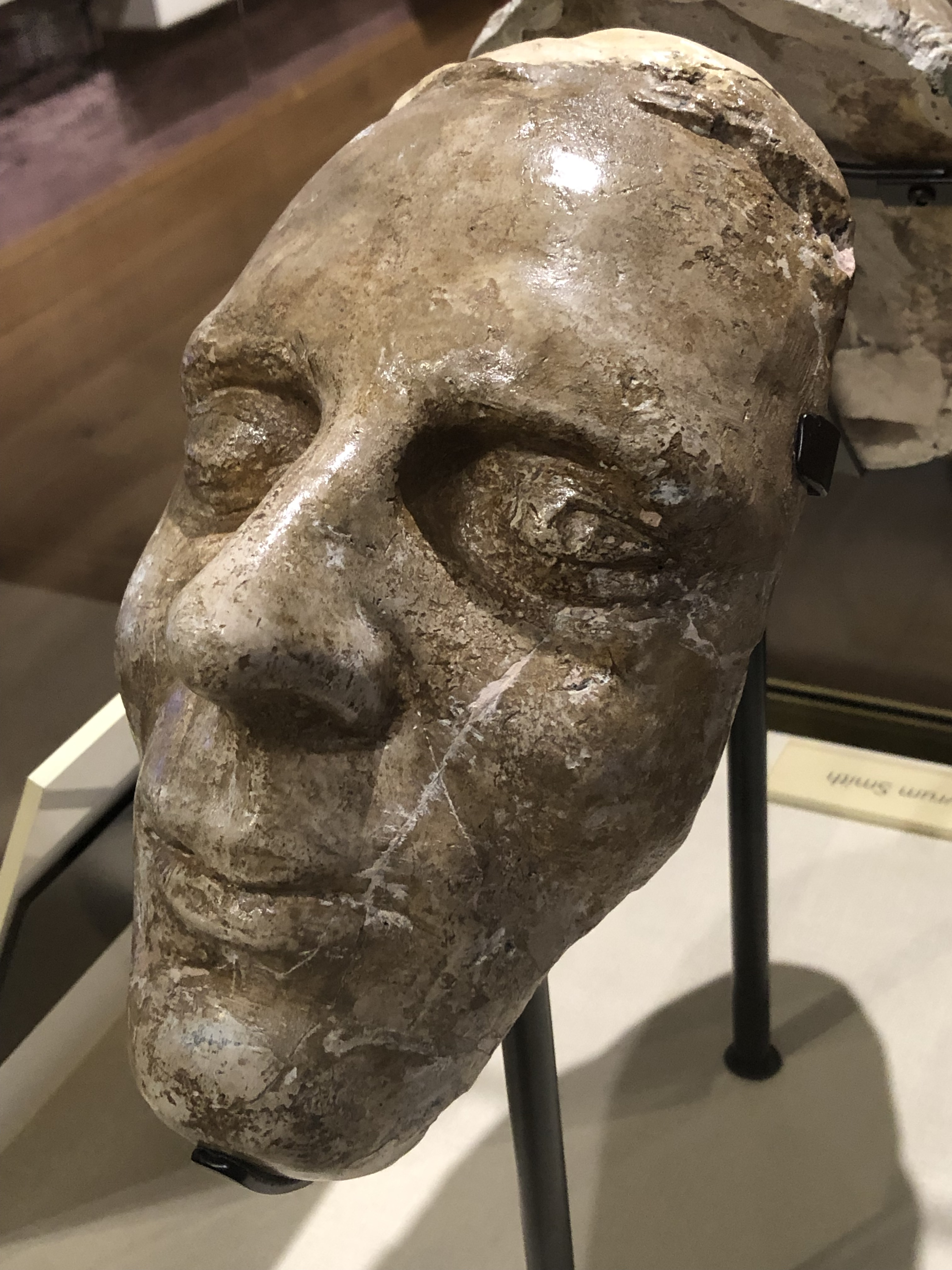
Death mask of Joseph Smith

== Responsibility and trial ==
After the killings, there was speculation about who was responsible. Ford denied accusations that he knew about the plot to kill Smith beforehand, but later wrote that it was good for Smith's followers to have been driven out of the state and said that their beliefs and actions were too different to have survived in Illinois. He said Smith was "the most successful impostor in modern times," and that some people "expect more protection from the laws than the laws are able to furnish in the face of popular excitement."

Ultimately, five defendants—Thomas C. Sharp, Mark Aldrich, William N. Grover, Jacob C. Davis and Levi Williams—were tried for the murders of the Smith brothers. All five defendants were acquitted by a jury, which was composed exclusively of non-Mormon members after the defense counsel convinced the judge to dismiss the initial jury, which did include Mormon members. The defense was led by Orville Hickman Browning, later a United States senator and cabinet member.

== Consequences in the Latter Day Saint movement ==
After the killing of Smith, a succession crisis occurred in the Latter Day Saint movement. Hyrum Smith, the Assistant President of the Church, was intended to succeed Joseph as President of the Church, but because he was killed alongside his brother, the proper succession procedure became unclear.

Initially, the primary contenders to succeed Smith were Sidney Rigdon, Brigham Young, and James Strang. Rigdon was the senior surviving member of the First Presidency, a body that had led the Latter Day Saint movement since 1832. At the time of Smith's death, he was estranged from Smith due to differences in doctrinal beliefs. Young, president of the Quorum of the Twelve, claimed authority was handed by Smith to the Quorum. Strang claimed that Smith designated him as the successor in a letter that was received a week before his death. Later, others came to believe that Smith's son, Joseph Smith III, was the rightful successor under the doctrine of lineal succession.

A schism resulted, with each claimant attracting followers. The majority of Latter Day Saints followed Young; these adherents later emigrated to what became Utah Territory and continued as the LDS Church. Rigdon's followers were known as Rigdonites, some of which later established The Church of Jesus Christ (Bickertonite). Strang's followers established the Church of Jesus Christ of Latter Day Saints (Strangite). In the 1860s, those who felt that Smith should have been succeeded by Joseph Smith III established the RLDS Church, which later changed its name to the Community of Christ.

Modernly, Joseph Smith is known to have married women who were already married as well as girls as young as 14. Some accounts say Smith may have had sexual relations with one wife, who later in her life stated that he fathered children by one or two of his wives, however DNA evidence does not support this. Some Mormons, especially those belonging to splinter groups such as the Community of Christ continue to deny that Joseph ever practiced polygamy in any sense. However, in 2014, LDS church spokesman Eric Hawkins said "(The church) publicly asserted Joseph Smith's practice of polygamy over a century and a half ago, especially in debate with other faith groups who traced their origin to Joseph Smith and who asserted that he did not practice plural marriage". Mainstream Mormons on the other hand tend to accept that he practiced polygamy, but emphasize the sealings as a spiritual bonding ritual which was platonic and intended to unify the human race into one family.

== See also ==
- List of lynchings and other homicides in Illinois
- Latter Day Saint martyrs
- Oath of vengeance
- "A Poor Wayfaring Man of Grief"
- "Praise to the Man"
