= Carthage Jail =

- U.S. National Register of Historic Places
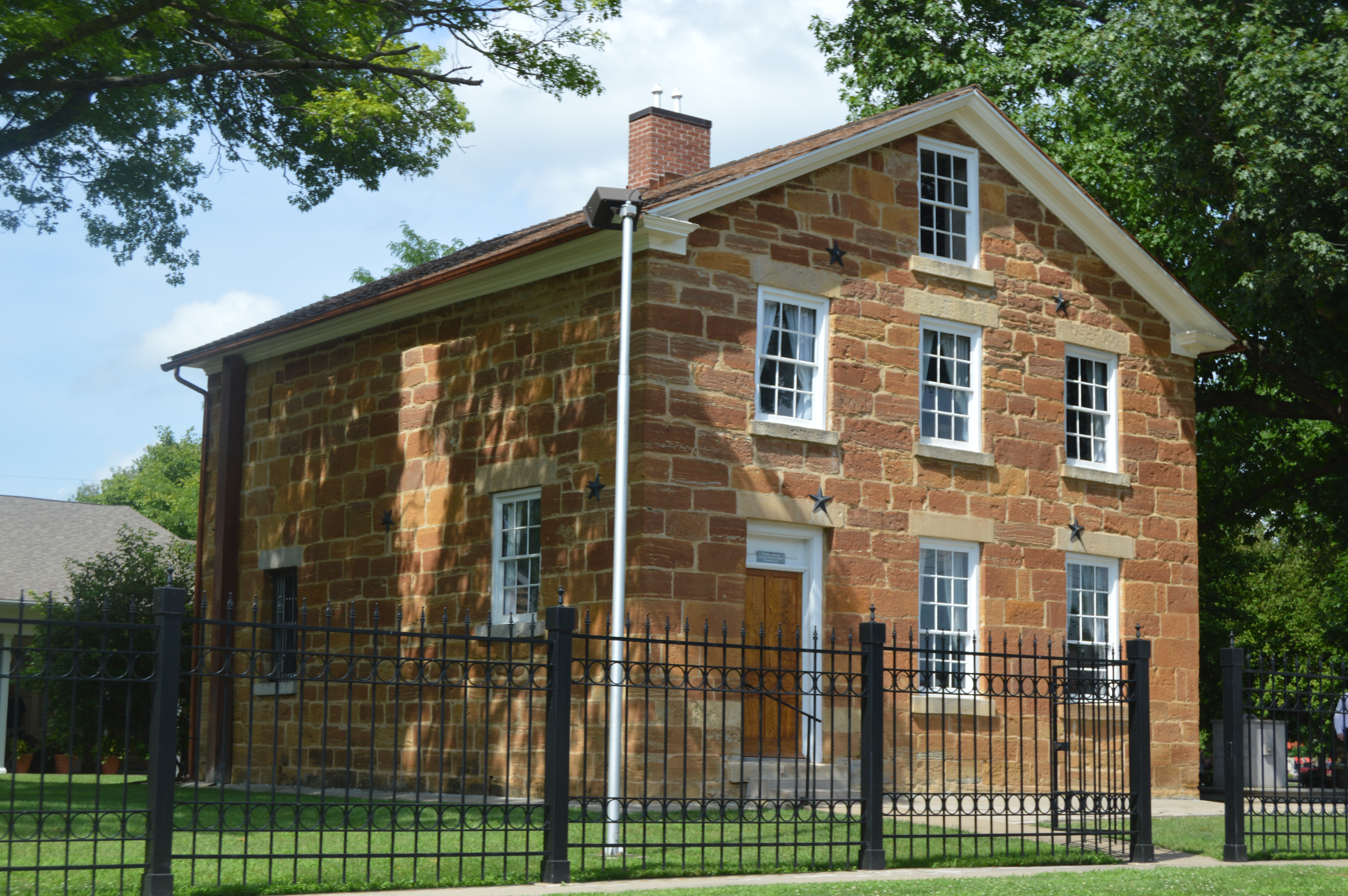
- Front and western side

- Location within Illinois Location within the United States
- Location: Walnut and N. Fayette Sts., Carthage, Illinois
- Coordinates: 40.41572°N 91.13884°W
- Area: 0.8 acres (0.32 ha)
- Built: 1839
- NRHP reference No.: 73000703
- Added to NRHP: March 30, 1973

Carthage Jail is a historic building in Carthage, Illinois, listed on the National Register of Historic Places (NRHP). It was built in 1839 and is best known as the location of the 1844 killing of Joseph Smith, founder of the Latter Day Saint movement, and his brother Hyrum, by a mob of approximately 84 men. It was added to the NRHP in 1973 and is operated by the Church of Jesus Christ of Latter-day Saints (LDS Church) as a historic site with an adjacent visitors' center.

== History ==
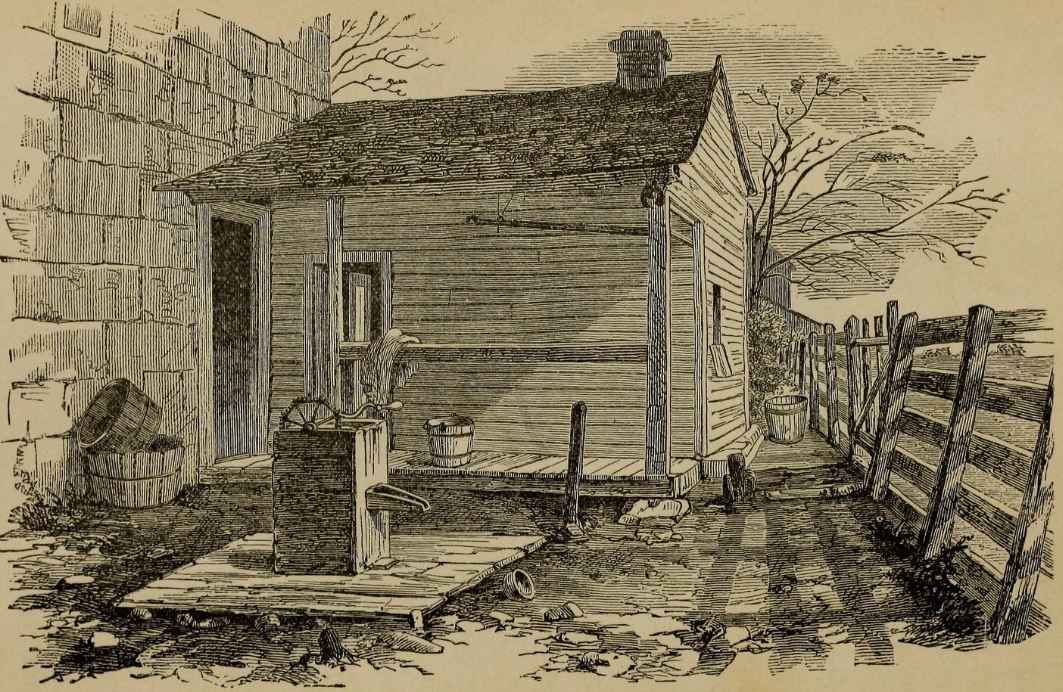
Side of Carthage Jail, showing well

The jail was built in 1839, constructed of red limestone quarried nearby. The building is rectangular and measures 29 feet (8.8 m) by 35 feet (11 m). It is a gable-front building has two stories and an attic. Like other county jails built during the same period, Carthage Jail was built to incarcerate petty thieves and debtors and as a temporary holding place for violent criminals. The first floor contained a debtor's room in the northwest corner, and a dungeon, or "criminal cell", was located on the north side of the second floor. The living area for the jailer's family included a kitchen and dining room on the first floor and a bedroom on the second floor. A small "summer kitchen" was added later.

In June 1844, Smith came to the jail to face charges relating to his ordering the destruction of facilities producing the Nauvoo Expositor, a newspaper whose only edition had been critical of the Smiths' religious teachings. He was joined by his brother, Hyrum, and fellow Latter Day Saints John Taylor and Willard Richards. On June 27, a mob stormed the upper room of the prison and killed the Smiths. Taylor was badly wounded and Richards was scathed, but not seriously injured. Hyrum Smith was 44 years old in February 1844 and Joseph Smith was 38 in December 1843.

=== Restoration ===
The building continued to be used as a jail until 1866 and was afterwards used as a private residence. It was acquired by the LDS Church in 1903 and a partial restoration was completed in 1935. It was added to the NRHP on March 30, 1973. The church fully restored the jail in 1989, returning the building to its 1844 appearance. The restoration also included an expansion of the visitors' center and renovations to the entire block. Ezra Taft Benson, president of the LDS church at the time, spoke in front of about 3,000 at a shrine dedication of the jail.

Tours of Carthage Jail are available including the original door with a bullet hole, where the jailer and his family would have slept, and where the Smith brothers were held.

In 2020, Carthage Jail and other historic sites in the Nauvoo area were temporarily closed due to the COVID-19 pandemic. The site operates as normal as of March 2025.

== See also ==
- Latter Day Saint martyrs
