= Langton (surname) =

Langton is a surname. Notable persons with that surname include:

- Anne Langton (1804–1893), English-born Canadian landscape artist and miniaturist and writer
- Arthur Langton (1912–1942), South African cricketer
- Baden Langton, co-anchor of CTV National News
- Bennet Langton (1736–1801), English writer and friend of Samuel Johnson
- Bobby Langton (1918–1996), English footballer
- Brooke Langton (born 1970), American actress
- Charles Langton (1923–1990), English cricketer
- Christopher Langton (physician) (1521–1578), English physician
- Christopher Langton (born 1948/49), American computer scientist
- Daniel Langton, British professor of modern Jewish history
- David Langton (1912–1994), British actor
- Diane Langton (1944–2025), English actress, singer, and dancer
- Emily Langton Langton, also known as Emily Langton Massingberd (1847–1897), women's rights campaigner and temperance activist
- Huw Lloyd-Langton (1951–2012), English guitarist for Hawkwind
- Jane Langton (silk merchant), a 15th-century English silkwoman based in London
- Jane Langton (1922–2018), American writer of mysteries and children's literature
- Jerry Langton (born 1965) Cando-American author
- Jim Langton (1918–1987), Irish hurler
- John Langton (died 1337), chancellor of England and Bishop of Chichester
- John Langton (1808–1894) British-born Canadian businessman, politician and civil servant
- Marcia Langton (born 1951), Australian scholar
- Mike Langton (born 1949), American politician
- Oliver Langton (1905–1978), English international motorcycle speedway rider
- Rae Langton (born 1963) Australian / British philosopher
- Ray Langton, fictional character in British soap opera Coronation Street
- Samuel Langton (1886–1918), English cricketer
- Simon Langton (died 1248), archbishop (elect) of York, after whom both Simon Langton Grammar Schools are named
- Simon Langton (born 1941), British television and film director
- Stephen Langton (1150–1228), archbishop of Canterbury
- Steven Langton (born 1983), American bobsledder
- Thomas Langton (died 1501), archbishop (elect) of Canterbury
- Walter Langton (died 1321), bishop of Coventry and Lichfield and treasurer of England
- William Langton or William of Rotherfield; (died 1279), archbishop (elect) of York and Bishop of Carlisle
- William Langton (died 1659), English lawyer and politician
- Winifred Langton (1909–2003), communist, internationalist and activist
- Zachary Langton (1698–1788), English clergyman and writer on theological subjects
