= Thayre =

Thayre is a surname. Notable people with the surname include:

- Ezra Thayre (1791–1862), American Mormon convert and leader
- Frederick Thayre (1894–1917), British flying ace
- Thomas Thayre (fl. 1603–1625), English medical writer

== See also ==
- Thayer (name)
