= List of non-canonical revelations in the Church of Jesus Christ of Latter-day Saints =

The Church of Jesus Christ of Latter-day Saints (LDS Church) believes in continuing revelation and an open canon. Many of the revelations the church's leaders have received have achieved that status of "scripture", and are published in a book called the Doctrine and Covenants. Other revelations have also been received by leaders of the church, but have not been canonized, either because they lack broad applicability, are of dubious origin, or have not been considered yet for inclusion.

== Revelations to Joseph Smith ==
Date	Source document	Notes
circa April–June 1829	Charles L. Walker Diary July 26, 1872	Walker wrote notes from a talk by Brigham Young in St. George.
[Brigham Young] said that while Joseph And Oliver were translating the Book of Mormon, they had a revelation that the order of Patriarchal Marriage and the Sealing was right.
circa January 1830	Book of Commandments and Revelations (Revelation Book 1)	Revelation commanding to get a copyright in Canada
A Revelation given to Joseph Oliver Hyram Josiah & Joseph Knight given at Manchester Ontario C[ounty] New York Behold I the Lord am God I Created the Heavens & the Earth & all things that in them is wherefore they are mine & I sway my scepter over all the Earth & ye are in my hands to will & to do that I can deliver you out of ev[e]ry difficulty & affliction according to your faith & dilligence & uprightness Before me & I have covenanted with my Servent [Joseph Smith Jr.] that earth nor Hell combined againsts him shall not take the Blessing out of his hands which I have prepared for him if he walketh uprightly before me neither the spiritual nor the temporal Blessing & Behold I also covenanted with those who have assisted him in my work that I will do unto them even the same Because they have done that which is pleasing in my sight yea even all save M[ar]tin [Harris] only it be one only Wherefore be dilligent in Securing the Copy right of my work upon all the face of the Earth of which is known by you unto my Servent Joseph & unto him whom he willeth accordinng as I shall command him that the faithful & the righteous may retain the temperal [temporal] Blessing as well as the Spirit[u]al & also that my work be not destroyed by the workers of iniquity to their own distruction [destruction] & damnation when they are fully ripe & now Behold I say unto you that I have covenanted & it Pleaseth me that Oliver Cowderey Joseph Knight Hyram Page & Josiah Stowel shall do my work in this thing yea even in securing the Copy right & they shall do it with an eye single to my Glory that it may be the means of bringing souls unto Salvation through mine only Begotten Behold I am God I have spoken it & it is expedient in me Wherefor[e] I say unto you that ye shall go to Kingston seeking me continually through mine only Begotten & if ye do this ye shall have my spirit to go with you & ye shall have an addition of all things which is expedient in me & I grant unto my servent a privelige [privilege] that he may sell a copyright through you speaking after the manner of men for the four Provinces if the People harden not their hearts against the enticeings of my spirit & my word for Behold it lieth in themselves to their condemnation or to their salvation Behold my way is before you & the means I will prepare & the Blessing I hold in mine own hand & if ye are faithful I will pour out upon you even as much as ye are able to Bear & thus it shall be Behold I am the father & it is through mine only begotten which is Jesus Christ your Redeemer amen
early 1830	David Whitmer's pamphlet, An Address to All Believers in Christ	According to Whitmer, Smith received this revelation after the failure to obtain a copyright for the Book of Mormon in Canada.
Some revelations are of God: some revelations are of man: and some revelations are of the devil.
May 15, 1831	Book of Commandments and Revelations	Given to Joseph Smith Sr. and Ezra Thayre. Was crossed out with notation, "This Commandment is not to be printed".
Commandment May 15, 1831 given to Ezra Thayer & Joseph Smith Sen concerning a farm &c. Hearken unto my words & behold I will make known unto you what ye shall do as it shall be pleasing unto me for verily I say unto you it must needs be that ye let the bargain stand that ye have made concerning those farms until it be so fulfilled Behold ye are holden for the one even so likewise thine advisary is holden for the other wherefore it must needs be that ye pay no more money for the present time until the contract be fulfilled. & let mine Servent Joseph & his family go into the House after thine advisary is gone & let my Servent Ezra board with him & let all the Brethren immediately assemble together & put up an house for my Servent Ezra & let my Servent Frederick's family remain & let the house be repaired & their want be supplied & when my Servent Frederick be secured unto him by deed or bond & thus he willeth that the Brethren reap the good thereof let my servent Joseph govern the things of the farm & provide for the families & let him have help in as much as he standeth in need let my servent Ezra humble himself & at the conference meeting he shall be ordained unto power from on high & he shall go from thence (if he be obedient unto my commandments) & proclaim my Gospel unto the western regions with my Servents that must go forth even unto the borders by the Lamanites for Behold I have a great work for them to do & it shall be given unto you to know what ye shall do at the conference meeting even so Amen" [Question] "What shall the Brethren do with their money?" [Answer] "Ye shall go forth & seek diligently among the Brethren & obtain lands & save the money that it may be consecrated to purchase lands in the west for an everlasting enheritance even So Amen"
July 17, 1831	W. W. Phelps wrote Smith's revelation in a letter to Brigham Young in 1861.	Ziba Peterson also made reference to this revelation (see also: origin of Latter Day Saint polygamy).
Revelation W. W. Phelps said Joseph Smith received in 1831 Verily, verily, saith the Lord your Redeemer, even Jesus Christ, the light and the life of the world, ye can not discerne [discern] with your natural eyes, the design and the purpose of your Lord and your God, in bringing you thus far into the wilderness for a trial of your faith, and to be especial witnesses, to bear testimony of this land, upon which the zion of God shall be built up in the last days, when it is redeemed. Verily, inasmuch as ye are united in calling upon my name to know my will concerning who shall preach to the inhabitants that shall assemble this day to learn what new doctrine you have to teach them, you have done wisely, for so did the prophets anciently, even Enoch, and Abraham, and others: and therefore, it is my will that my servant Oliver Cowdery should open the meeting with prayer; that my servant W. W. Phelps should preach the discourse; and that my servants Joseph Coe and Ziba Peterson should bear testimony as they shall be moved by the Holy Spirit. This will be pleasing in the sight of your Lord. Verily I say unto you, ye are laying the foundation of a great work for the salvation of as many as will believe and repent, and obey the ordinances of the gospel, and continue faithful to the end: For, as I live, saith the Lord, so shall they live. Verily I say unto you that the wisdom of man in his fallen state, knoweth not the purposes and the privileges of my holy priesthood. but ye shall know when ye receive a fulness by reason of the anointing: For it is my will, that in time, ye should take unto you wives of the Lamanites and Nephites, that their posterity may become white, delightsome and Just, for even now their females are more virtuous than the gentiles. Gird up your loins and be prepared for the mighty work of the Lord to prepare the world for my second coming to meet the tribes of Israel according to the predictions of all the holy prophets since the beginning; For the final desolation, and decrees upon Babylon: For, as the everlasting gospel is carried from this land, in love for peace, to gather mine elect from the four quarters of the earth, for Zion,— even so shall rebellion follow after speedily, with hatred for war until the consumption decreed hath made a full end of all the kingdoms and nations that strive to govern themselves by the laws and precepts, and force and powers of men under the curse of sin, in all the world. Verily I say unto you, that the day of vexation and vengeance is nigh at the doors of this nation, when wicked, ungodly and daring men will rise up in wrath and might, and go forth in anger, like as the dust is driven by [a] terrible wind; and they will be the means of the destruction of the government, and cause the death and misery of man[y] souls, but the faithful among my people shall be preserved in holy places, during all these tribulations. Be patient, therefore, possessing your souls in peace and love, and keep the faith that is now delivered unto you for the gathering of scattered Israel, and lo, I am with you, though ye cannot see me, till I come: even so. Amen.
Sometime between 4 and 20 March 1832	Revelation Book 1	See also Criticism of the Book of Abraham#Pure language project
A Sample of pure Language given by Joseph the Seer as copied by Br Johnson Question What is the name of God in pure Language Answer Awmen. Q The meaning of the pure word A[w]men A It is the being which made all things in all its parts. Q What is the name of the Son of God. A The Son Awmen. Q What is the Son Awmen. A It is the greatest of all the parts of Awmen which is the Godhead the first born. Q What is man. A This signifies Sons Awmen. the human family the children of men the greatest parts of Awmen Sons the Son Awmen Q What are Angels called in pure language. A Awmen Angls-men Q What are the meaning of these words. A Awmen's Ministering servants sanctified who are sent forth from heaven to minister for or to Sons Awmen the greatest part of Awmen Son. Sons Awmen Son Awmen Awmen
January 1841	McIntire Minute Book	see also Phrenology and the Latter Day Saint Movement
Regarding phrenology, Smith said he had "the Lord Rebuking him sharply in Crediting such a thing; & further said there was No Reality in such a science But was the works of the Devil
September 15, 1841	William Clayton Journal	William Clayton wanted to marry a sister (Lydia) of two of his wives. Joseph Smith received this revelation that prohibited it, and then asked for Clayton's assistance in marrying Lydia himself, which she refused.
President Joseph told me he had lately had a new item of law revealed to him in relation to myself. He said the Lord had revealed to him that a man could only take 2 of a family except by express revelation and I had said I intended to take Lydia he made this known for my benefit. To have more than two in a family was apt to cause wrangles and trouble. He finally asked if I would not give L[ydia] to him. I said I would so far as I had anything to do in it. He requested me to talk to her.
14 March 1844	Council of Fifty Minutes	See also Council of Fifty
Verily thus saith the Lord, this is the name by which you shall be called, The Kingdom of God and his Laws, with the keys and power thereof, and judgement in the hands of his servants. Ahman Christ.
25 April 1844	Council of Fifty Minutes	A committee had been writing a constitution for the Theocracy being developed. This revelation ended further discussion of a written constitution. see also Council of Fifty
Verily thus saith the Lord, ye are my constitution, and I am your God, and ye are my spokesmen. From henceforth do as I shall command you. Saith the Lord.

== Revelations to Brigham Young ==
Date	Source document	Notes
January 30, 1846	Brigham Young Journal	
Thus saith the Lord unto Reuben Miller through Brigham Young: that Strang is a wicked & corrupt man & that his revelations are as false as he is. Therefore, turn away from his folly & never let it be said of Reuben Miller, that he ever was led away and entangled by such nonsense.
February 17, 1847	Brigham Young office files	
in my dream I went to See Joseph he set in a large window in a south west direction leand back in his chair, with his feet on the lower round. I took him by the right hand and kist him meney times he looked perfically natureal, I asked him why it was that we could not be together as we used to live he had ben from us a long time and we wanted his Society and I due not like to be Seprated from him. he rose up from his chair looked at me with an ernest and plesent countenece, Spoak in his usual way [“]it is all right.[“] I then Said to him [“]I due not like to be a way from you.[“] [“]it is wright[,”] he replied [“]we cannot be together yet we Shall by en by but you will have to due with out me a while and then we Shall be together again. I then descoverd there was a hand raile betweene us. he Staid by the window, and I was in twile light to the north of me it was verry dark to the Southwest of him, it was verry light. I then Said to Br Joseph [“]the Bretheren you know well better then I due you raised them up, and braught the Preasthood to us. the Bretheren have grate anxiety to understand the law of adoption or Seeling principles[,”] <and I Said [“]if you have a word of counsel for me I shall be glad to receive it[.”]> Joseph Stept toards me looked verey ernest yet plesent and commenced his instruction [“]tell the People to be humble and faithful and Sure to keep the Spirit of the Lord and it will lead them right. be careful and not turne away the Smal Still voice it will teach how to due and where to goe it will yeald the fruits of the Kingdom [Page 2] tell the Bretheren keep there harts open to conviction So that when the Holy Ghost comes to them there harts will be reddy to recive it they can tell the Spiret of the Lord from all other Spirets. it will whisper peace and joy to there Soles and it will take males [malice] hatred enving Strife and all evel from their harts and their hole desire will be to due good bring forth Richeaness and build up the Kingdom of God. tel the Brethren if they will follow the Spiret of the Lord and if they will they <will> find them Selves jest as they ware organ[ized] <by our Father in Heven> before they came into the world. [“]Our Father in heven organized the human family but they are all disorganized and in grate confusion.[“] then he Shewed me the patern how they ware in the beginning this I cannot describe but Saw it and where the Preasthood had ben taken from the Earth and how it must be join[e]d together So there would be a perfict chane from Father Adam to his latest posterity he Said [“]tel the people to be sure to Keep the Spiret of the and fallow it and it woud lead them jest right[.”] Brigham Young Febury <the> 17 <about 12 a.m.> the 1847
February 1874	Copied from talk by Thomas Haddon	Only source is Haddon's notes.
The word of the Lord that was revealed to his People, by his servant the Prophet sear and Revelator, President Brigham Young, February 1874. He speak unto the people saying, Thus saith the Lord it is my will that this people should enter into A Holy united order, by concentrating their labour, there time, and their means together for the interest of my Kingdom, and for their own mutual benefit, And I the Lord will bless them abundantly, they shall get along with less labour, and less means, And become a great deal richer, and happier, and be enabled to do a great deal more good, And if not the curse of the Lord will be upon them, for we are got as far as we can get in our present position, for the time is fully come that we should enter into this Holy Order, the Lord is saying come, and Holy angles are saying come, and all good men are saying come, and I say come let us enter into this Holy Order, that the Kingdom of Heaven may continue to advance, till it fill the whole earth with the knowledge and love of God, Hear this oh Israel, I tell you the Kingdom of God cannot advance one step further until we enter into this Holy Order.

== Revelations to Heber C. Kimball ==
Date	Source document	Notes
27 Mar 18[rest of date is unknown]	Heber C. Kimball Memobook	
9 oclock in the Evning the Lord said to H. C. Kimball The division would take place between the North and South within Six years and much Blo[o]d would be spilt on the ocation [occasion] and I should live to see it. The Word of the Lord to Me HCK.
February 3, 1852	Heber C. Kimball Memobook	
The Spirit said I should devot[e] my time to the Church of Jesus Christ of Latter day Saints and I should not be under the Law of Lawless women anny more in time as I have fulfilled the Law [and] and [am] now free from Such Spirrits, and the said time shall be devoted to the humble and obed[i]ent and those that shall listen to my council and shall have faith in my council and shall listen to his [Kimball's] law for he is my Servent and I will stand by him and those that will not build him up shall not prosper. I mean those of his house shall not prosper and peas [peace] shall not be with them. They shall see sorrow Except they repent. HCK
February 3, 1852	Heber C. Kimball Memobook	
My Son Heber he shall devote his entire time to the caus[e] of God and to the Church of Jesus Christ of Latter day Saints and he shall not be under the law of Lawless women any more in time as he has fulfilled the law and is now free from such Spirrits and the said time shall be devoted to the humble and obedent and those that shall listen.
February 23, 1859	Heber C. Kimball Memobook	see Utah War
The word of the Lord to me that the Army will leave this year or most of them.
March 6, 1859	Heber C. Kimball Memobook	
In the Evning the Lord told me there would [be] much Sickness the coming summer and cause the people to mourn. Which was so. Word to me HCK
January 4, 1862	Heber C. Kimball Memobook	
It was revealed to me that the United States would make war with this people the Saints with in three years from this time. In the Evening of the 7 of January the Lord told me the United States would make war on this people soon to test the people to see if they would stand by Him. In the Evening of 10 January the Lord Said [my] prairs ware hurd and I sould be blest before the Saints in a powerful manner.
January 21, 1862	Heber C. Kimball Memobook	
In the evning it was told me by the /Lord God/ that Congress of the United States would reject the Saints and would not admit us as a State government and forse [force] those officers on us by thare power. HCK.
March [day is missing], 1862	Heber C. Kimball Memobook	
This night the Lord told me the time was near I Heber should be lifted up on high in favor of Israel and my Servent Daniel Wells sould see Sorrow even as my Servent Heber had to his full becaus he, Daniel, had pressed my servent Heber and held him at a distance in stead of doing him good as he might, when he had the power in his hands. These words are true and shall come to pass in the Name of Jesus Christ, Amen.
March 10, 1862	Heber C. Kimball Memobook	
The Lord told me the time was near when I Heber would be esteemed by His Servant Brigham more than any man that lives in the flesh.
March 12, 1862	Heber C. Kimball Memobook	
That I Heber should live 25 years if I desired it and should become a mighty man of God in the house of Israel and His power should increase on me more and more.
March 29, 1862	Heber C. Kimball Memobook	
It was told me the time was near when I Heber should be lifted up in the Eyes of Israel and Daniel H. Wells should see sorrow Even as he had caused sorrow to come on his servent HCK becaus he sat on me and oppressed me when he had power to do me good. Even so Amen. HCK.
December 27, 1864	Heber C. Kimball Memobook	
I was told by the Lord that those that had Saught my hurt and had caused me to be cast off by His Servent Brigham should see sorrow and be removed out of their place. Daniel H. Wells, Albert Carrington, Joseph A. Young and others and they should be spoiled in all there Evil designs.

== Revelations to John Taylor ==
Date	Source document	Notes
November 19, 1877	George Q. Cannon collection	Revelation concerning the Brigham Young estate
I have been asking the LORD to show me how to adjust the property of the church held in the name of the late President Brigham Young, so as to do justice to his estate; and yet not wrong the Church, and have received the following: You have asked of Me, and others of the Twelve have asked of Me, that wisdom might be given to you to adjust these property matters of the church. Thus saith the LORD: Be one, be united, be honest, act upon the principles of justice and righteousness to the living and the dead, and to My church, and I the LORD will sustain you and acknowledge your labors. Amen.
June 25 and 26, 1882	John Taylor Revelations	Revelation concerning plural marriage.
Question: Is the law of Celestial Marriage a law given to this nation or to the world? Answer: No—in no other sense than as the gospel is given and in accordance with the laws thereof. So far as it is made known unto men, it is made known unto them as the gospel is made known unto them, and is part of the New and Everlasting Covenant and it is only those who receive the gospel that are able to, or capable of, entering into this covenant. Have I not said through My servant Joseph Smith that all kingdoms are governed by law? And if they receive not the law of the gospel, they cannot participate in the blessings of Celestial marriage, which pertains to Mine elect. No person or people or nation can enter into the principle of Celestial marriage unless they come in by Me, saith the LORD, and obey the law of My gospel through the medium of him who is appointed unto this power as made known unto My people through My servant Joseph in a Revelation on the eternity of the marriage covenant, including the plurality of wives. I have therein stated that, "all those who have this law revealed unto them must obey the same. For behold, I reveal unto you a New and an Everlasting Covenant; and if ye abide not that covenant, then are ye damned; for no one can reject this covenant and be permitted to enter into My glory" [D&C 132:3–4]. Furthermore, "And as pertaining to the New and Everlasting Covenant, it was instituted for the fullness of My glory; and he that receiveth a fullness thereof must and shall abide the law, or he shall be damned, saith the Lord God" [D&C 132:6]. It is again written that, "all kingdoms have a law given” [D&C 88:36]. The Celestial kingdom, including the promise of Eternal Life, pertains to, "the church of the Firstborn, even of God, the holiest of all, through Jesus Christ, His Son" [D&C 88:5]. Therefore, such must be sanctified from all unrighteousness, that they may be prepared for the Celestial glory. "For he who cannot abide the law of a Celestial kingdom, cannot abide a Celestial glory; and he who cannot abide the law of a terrestrial kingdom cannot abide a terrestrial glory. And he who cannot abide the law of a telestial kingdom cannot abide a telestial glory; therefore, he is not meet for a kingdom of glory. Therefore, he must abide a kingdom which is not a kingdom of glory" [D&C 88:22–24]. Each of the persons inhabiting these several kingdoms shall be quickened by the same power that pertains to the kingdom that they are destined to inherit, whether Celestial, terrestrial, or telestial; and shall receive of their respective glories. And again it is written, “And again, verily I say unto you, that which is governed by law is also preserved by law, and perfected and sanctified by the same. That which breaketh a law, and abideth not by law, but seeketh to become a law unto itself, and willeth to abide in sin, cannot be sanctified by law, neither by mercy, justice, nor judgment" [D&C 88:34–35]. It is further written, speaking of Celestial marriage, "And verily I say unto you, that the conditions of this law are these: All covenants, contracts, bonds, obligations, oaths, vows, performances, connections, associations, or expectations that are not made and entered into, and sealed by the Holy Spirit of Promise, of him who is anointed, both as well for time and for all eternity, and that too most holy, by revelation and commandment, through the medium of Mine anointed, whom I have appointed on the earth to hold this power (and I have appointed unto My servant Joseph to hold this power in the last days, and there is never but one on the earth at a time on whom this power and the keys of this priesthood are conferred) are of no efficacy, virtue, or force in and after the resurrection from the dead; for all contracts that are not made unto this end have an end when men are dead" [D&C 132:7]. This law is a Celestial law, and pertains to a Celestial kingdom. It is a New and Everlasting Covenant, and appertains to thrones, principalities, powers, dominions, and eternal increase in the Celestial kingdom of God. You are not now sent to proclaim this principle to the United States, nor to the world, nor to urge it upon them. It is not for them as a nation or nations, only as many as accept the law of My gospel, and are governed thereby. Behold, if you were to preach this principle unto them, and they said, we accept it, could you then administer it unto them? Verily I say unto you, nay. Have I not said, "Behold, Mine house is a house of order, saith the Lord God, and not a house of confusion. Will I accept of an offering, saith the LORD, that is not made in My name? Or will I receive at your hands that which I have not appointed? And will I appoint unto you, saith the LORD, except it be by law, even as I and My Father ordained unto you, before the world was? I am the LORD thy God, and I give unto you this commandment: that no man shall come unto the Father but by Me or by My word, which is My law, saith the LORD. And everything that is in the world, whether it be ordained of men, by thrones, or principalities, or powers, or things of name, whatsoever that may be, that are not by Me, saith the LORD, shall be thrown down, and shall not remain after men are dead, neither in nor after the resurrection saith the LORD your God. For whatsoever things remain are by Me, and whatsoever things are not by Me shall be shaken and destroyed. Therefore, if a man marry him a wife in the world, and he marry her not by Me nor by My word, and he covenant with her so long as he is in the world and she with him, their covenant and marriage are not of force when they are dead, and when they are out of the world; therefore, they are not bound by any law when they are out of the world" [D&C 132:8–15]. You ask, what shall we do? Thus saith the LORD, obey My law and seek not to become a law unto yourselves, nor trust to outside influences; but seek in the way appointed to the Lord your God. Ye are My spokesmen, I am your God; and as I have before said, I now again say: Henceforth do as I shall command you. Concerning the course taken by the United States, they have a right to reject this law themselves, as they have a right to reject the gospel; but it is contrary to the provisions of the Constitution, which is the supreme law of the land, for them to prohibit you from obeying it. Therefore, abide in My law which I have revealed unto you, saith the Lord God, and contend for your rights by every legal and constitutional method and in accordance with the institutions, laws, and Constitution of the United States. Be humble, be faithful, be diligent; seek unto Me and it shall be made know unto you from time to time what My will is pertaining to this matter. I am the Lord your God, hearken to Me, and obey My law, and your enemies shall be confounded, and My kingdoms shall be victorious. Even so, Amen.
June 27, 1882	John Taylor Revelations	Revelation addressed to the Council of Fifty.
Verily, thus saith the LORD, I have instituted My kingdom and My laws, with the keys and power thereof. And have appointed you as My spokesmen and My constitution, with President John Taylor at your head, whom I have appointed to My church and My kingdom as Prophet, Seer, and Revelator, unto My church and unto My kingdom—and to preside over My church and over My kingdom, and to be My mouthpiece unto My church and unto My kingdom. And I will honor him, and he shall speak forth the words that I will reveal unto him from time to time by the whispering of My Spirit, by the revelation of My will and My word, or by Mine own voice as I will, saith the LORD. And ye shall listen to his words as My words, saith the Lord your God. Thus saith the Lord God who rules in the heavens above, and in the earth beneath: I have introduced My kingdom and My government, even the kingdom of God that My servants have heretofore prophesied of— and that I taught My disciples to pray for, saying, "Thy kingdom come, Thy will be done on earth as it is in heaven." For the establishment of My rule, for the introduction of My law, for the protecting of My church, and for the maintenance, promulgation, and protection of civil and religious liberty in this nation and throughout the world. And all men of every nation, color, and creed shall yet be protected and shielded thereby; and every nation, kindred, and people, and tongue shall yet bow the knee to Me, and acknowledge Me to be Ahman Christ, to the glory of God the Father. And My law, and My rule, and My dominion shall extend over the whole earth, and no one shall stay My hand, or question my authority; for I rule by right, in the heavens above and in the earth; and My right, and My rule and My dominion shall yet be known and extended to all people. And now behold, I speak unto you through My servant John, whom you have acknowledged and shall acknowledge as My spokesman: Thus saith the Lord God, the Maker of heaven and earth, the ruler of the universe, whose right it is to rule in the heavens above, and in the earth beneath. Behold, I raised up My servant Joseph Smith to introduce My gospel, and to build up My church, and establish My kingdom on the earth. And I gave unto him wisdom, and knowledge, and revelation, and intelligence pertaining to the past, the present and the future, even to that extent which was not known among men. And I endowed him with power from on high, and conferred upon him the priesthood of Aaron, and also the Priesthood of Melchizedek, which is after the order of the Son of God, even the holiest of all, and after the power of an endless life and administereth forever in this world and the world to come. He was called and ordained to this office before the world was; he was called by Me, and empowered by Me, and sustained by Me to introduce and establish My church and kingdom upon the earth—and to be a Prophet, Seer, and Revelator to My church and kingdom; and to be a King and Ruler over Israel. He was slain for the testimony of Jesus, and for the word of God; but he yet lives, and is with Me where I am. And now I speak unto you who are members of this council, and of My kingdom, and I say unto you, as I said unto My disciples of old: Ye have not chosen Me, but I have chosen you. I called you by My servant Joseph, and by My servant Brigham, and by My servant John. You did not teach and instruct Me; but I have taught and instructed you, and organized you according to My eternal laws. Ye are My constitution, and I am your God. And I will be acknowledged; and My will, and My word, and My law shall bear rule in My kingdom, saith the LORD. If it does not, then it is not My kingdom, and then are ye not My spokesmen; for if it is by the wisdom of man, by the intelligence of man, and under the direction of man, then it is a kingdom of man, and it is not of Me, and I will not acknowledge it, saith the Lord God. Have I not instructed you in all that you know, and is not this kingdom organized and directed by revelation from Me? Is it not called the Kingdom of God? If therefore it is not My kingdom, why do you make use of My name, and invoke My authority and My aid? Is this kingdom not called, “The Kingdom of God, and His laws, with the Keys and Powers Thereof, and Judgment in the Hands of His Servant Ahman Christ"? And because I am kind and beneficent to all peoples, and because I have given to man his free agency, and have always maintained that free agency among all peoples, and have treated all men alike among all nations, and made the sun to shine on the evil and the good, on the just and the unjust, and have never controlled the consciences of men, think ye, therefore, that I have no rights, and will yield up all My authority to the dictates and caprices of wicked and corrupt men? Verily I say unto you, Nay. Behold, Satan sought to take away the free agency of man in the beginning, for which he was thrust out of heaven, and has sought to introduce the same principles upon the earth, which principles are opposed to Me, to My institutions, and My laws, and to the freedom, the welfare, and happiness of man—and by which principles the government of the United States sought to deprive My people of their free agency. And because men have been under the influence and power and dominion of Lucifer, and because tyranny and oppression and evil have abounded by him, and not by Me, saith the Lord your God, shall righteousness and justice, and judgment, and truth, and virtue, and holiness be forever trampled under foot? And the principles of tyranny, oppression, and misrule, and anarchy, deception, and fraud forever prevail? Verily I say unto you, Nay. And for this cause have I introduced My church and My kingdom, that pure and righteous principles might be inculcated, and man by his free agency yield a willing obedience to My law. For after this testimony and the rejection thereof, I will sweep the earth of evil doers as with the besom of destruction. For this is My right; and while man has free agency, judgment belongs to Me, saith the LORD. And I will come out of My hiding place and vex the nations of the earth because of their iniquities, their misrule, their tyranny, their oppression, their corruption, their murders, their adulteries and fornications, and all their abominations. And because My servant Joseph, whose soul was pained because of their cruelties and oppressions, the injustice, fraud, and corruption, and the inhumanity of men, proclaimed himself the advocate of human rights, the advocate of liberty, and the friend of man. And because, according to My eternal decrees, the free agency of man should be guaranteed to all men, I moved upon him to introduce into My kingdom certain parties not in My church—for the purpose of exhibiting into My kingdom that I would still maintain the free agency of man, and that I hold inviolate that principle, and will still maintain it to the end—Think ye, therefore, that because they are thus admitted to a share in My government and My laws that they shall be permitted to break their covenants, violate their obligations, and reject Me and My laws and authority, and seek to overthrow the kingdom of God, and deprive My people who are contending for freedom, and who shall yet maintain it, of their agency, and of My laws? Verily I say unto you, Nay. They shall be admitted to the rights of representation in the manner appointed, after subscribing to My covenants and commandments, and have a full and free opportunity of presenting their views, interests, and principles, and enjoying all the free and rights of this council; but they shall acknowledge Me and My laws in this council, saith the Lord God. For My people's rights, and immunities, and free agency shall be acknowledged as well as those of all other people. And My laws and government shall be sustained, or I will not acknowledge you, saith the LORD. I have invested you with the keys and power of My kingdom, and they cannot be bartered away to others. Shall all men be free? Yes, free to do right, free to express their sentiments and opinions, and have a full, fair, and free representation; but no man shall violate his covenants, pervert My laws, subvert others free agency, and trample upon Mine authority in this council, saith the Lord your God. Again I say unto you, as I said before: Henceforth do as I shall command you, saith the Lord your God. Even so, Amen.
June 28, 1882	“Revelations given to John Taylor, 1882–1884”	Revelation addressed to the Council of Fifty
Am I not King of kings, and Lord of lords? Do I not rule in the heavens above and in the earth beneath, as I will, saith the LORD? And though men do not acknowledge Me, yet do I control them; and I will control them according to My will and purposes; and I will make use of the kings of the earth, and the rulers and powers of the earth to accomplish My purposes, saith the Lord God your Redeemer—and none shall stay My hand. And I will build up My kingdom as I have heretofore decreed and made known through the mouth of Mine holy prophets, so far as they have declared My purposes pertaining thereto; and I have many other things to make known and to proclaim relative to My church, and to My kingdom, and to the building up of My Zion on the earth. Behold, you are My kingdom, and rulers in My kingdom, and then you are also, many of you, rulers in My church according to your ordinations therein. For are you not of the First Presidency, and of the Twelve Apostles, and some Presidents of Stakes, and some bishops, and some high priests and some seventies and elders therein? And are ye not all of My church, and belong to My holy Priesthood? And then are ye not all of My kingdom, and do you not belong to My kingdom, and are ye not the representatives thereof, even My constitution? And am I not your God, even your Redeemer and your King? Behold, I have told you to do as I command you, and have I not a right to dictate in the affairs of My kingdom? And is it not incumbent upon you to obey Me as your LORD, your lawgiver, and your King? Behold thus saith the LORD, I will be obeyed by My council, and if they do not acknowledge Me, I will not acknowledge them, saith the Lord of Hosts, the God and King of the whole earth. Speaking of My church, behold I established My church that I might reveal unto them My word, and My will, and the law of the Gospel, and the order of the Holy priesthood. And I set in order My priesthood, even the Aaronic and Melchizedek; and I have sent forth Mine elders to the world to preach this gospel of the kingdom to all people and to gather Mine elect from among all nations. That a people might be prepared through My gospel, through the manifestation of My Spirit, even the Spirit of Truth, the Gift of the Holy Ghost, the Comforter, and through the teachings of My holy priesthood, and the revelations of My will, to comprehend the law of My gospel; to be one with each other, and to be one with Me as I am one with the Father. To comprehend and obey the principles of righteousness, virtue, holiness, purity, and the love and fear of God; and to assist in building My Zion unto Me, saith the Lord of Hosts, and to prepare for the salvation and redemption of the world, even the living and the dead. And again, it required this gospel, this priesthood, this revelation, this unity, this Spirit, to introduce the kingdom of God, the law of God, the authority and dominion of God, that the will of God might be done on earth as it is done in heaven. I rule now among the nations, but not by their consent, and the rulers of the earth do not know Me or My law, nor recognize My authority. They have their free agency and use it; so have also My people, and they use their agency through My gospel to serve Me, to obey My law, and to build up My church and kingdom. For outside of My church there is no people on the earth who will listen to My law. And if there was no people who would listen to My law, how could I have a kingdom, and how could I be their ruler? I have established My kingdom to be a shield and protection to My church, to learn and comprehend My law, and to carry out My purposes, that My will may be done on earth as it is done in heaven; the church through the law and Spirit of the gospel to preserve the virtue and purity of the kingdom. And the kingdom to preserve and protect the church from the aggressions of the wicked and ungodly. And behold, I do not want My own will, but the will of My Father; the same is My Father and My God, and your Father and your God, and we are One: I in Him, and you in Me. Am I and My Father with the church? Yes. Am I not your God, your Ahman Christ? You so acknowledge Me. My Father is King of kings, and Lord of lords. I rule as My Father directs Me, and if ye rule and direct according to My will, under the direction of My servant who is your President and head, are we not one, and is it not the rule and government of God? And any kingdom, or government, or dominion that is not under My direction, and does not acknowledge Me, I will not acknowledge, saith the Lord of Hosts; and if they fight against Me and My laws, and My church, and My kingdom, they shall be overthrown in Mine own due time, for I have so decreed. Even so, Amen.
October 13, 1882	Messages of the First Presidency	
Thus saith the LORD to the Twelve, and to the Priesthood and people of My Church: Let My servants George Teasdale and Heber J. Grant be appointed to fill the vacancies in the Twelve, that you may be fully organized and prepared for the labors devolving upon you, for you have a great work to perform; and then proceed to fill up the presiding quorum of Seventies, and assist in organizing that body of My Priesthood who are your co-laborers in the ministry. You may appoint Seymour B. Young to fill up the vacancy in the presiding quorum of Seventies, if he will conform to My law; for it is not meet that men who will not abide My law shall preside over My Priesthood; and then proceed forthwith and call to your aid any assistance that you may require from among the Seventies to assist you in your labors in introducing and maintaining the Gospel among the Lamanites throughout the land. And then let High Priests be selected, under the direction of the First Presidency, to preside over the various organizations that shall exist among this people; that those who receive the Gospel may be taught in the doctrines of My Church and in the ordinances and laws thereof, and also in the things pertaining to My Zion and My Kingdom, saith the LORD, that they may be one with you in My Church and My Kingdom. Let the Presidency of My Church be one in all things; and let the Twelve also be one in all things; and let them all be one with Me as I am one with the Father. And let the High Priests organize themselves, and purify themselves, and prepare themselves for this labor, and for all other labors that they may be called upon to fulfill. And let the Presidents of Stakes also purify themselves, and the Priesthood and people of the Stakes over which they preside, and organize the Priesthood in their various Stakes according to My law, in all the various departments thereof, in the High Councils, in the Elders Quorums, and in the Bishops and their Councils, and in the Quorums of Priests, Teachers and Deacons; that every Quorum may be fully organized according to the order of My Church; and, then, let them inquire into the standing and fellowship of all that hold My Holy Priesthood in their several Stakes; and if they find those that are unworthy let them remove them, except they repent; for My Priesthood, whom I have called and whom I have sustained and honored, shall honor Me and obey My laws, and the laws of My Holy Priesthood, or they shall not be considered worthy to hold My Priesthood, saith the Lord. And let my Priesthood humble themselves before Me, and seek not their own will but My will; for if My Priesthood whom I have chosen, and called, and endowed with the spirit and gifts of their several callings, and with the powers thereof, do not acknowledge Me I will not acknowledge them, saith the Lord; for I will be honored and obeyed by My Priesthood. And, then, I call upon My Priesthood, and upon all of My people to repent of all their sins and shortcomings, of their covetousness and pride and self will, and of all their iniquities wherein they sin against Me; and to seek with all humility to fulfill My law, as My Priesthood, My Saints, and My people; and I call upon the heads of families to put their houses in order according to the law of God, and attend to the various duties and responsibilities associated therewith, and to purify themselves before Me, and to purge out iniquity from their households. And I will bless and be with you, saith the Lord; and ye shall gather together in your holy places wherein ye assemble to call upon Me, and ye shall ask for such things as are right, and I will hear your prayers, and My Spirit and power shall be with you, and My blessing shall rest upon you, upon your families, your dwellings and your households, upon your flocks and herds and fields, your orchards and vineyards, and upon all that pertains to you; and you shall be My people and I will be your God; and your enemies shall not have dominion over you, for I will preserve you and confound them, saith the LORD, and they shall not have power nor dominion over you; for My word shall go forth, and My work shall be accomplished, and My Zion shall be established, and My rule and My power and My dominion shall prevail among My people, and all nations shall yet acknowledge Me. Even so, Amen. Gardo House, Salt Lake City Friday morning, 13 October 1882
April 14, 1883	"To the Seventies"	A Revelation given through President John Taylor, at Salt Lake City, Utah Territory, on Saturday, April 14, 1833, in answer to the question: “Show unto us Thy will, O Lord, concerning the organization of the Seventies.” It was published together with a document outlining the plans Church leaders had for the Seventies.
What ye have written is my will, and is acceptable unto me: and furthermore, Thus saith the Lord unto the First Presidency, unto the Twelve, unto the Seventies an unto all my holy Priesthood, let not your hearts be troubled, neither be ye concerned about the management and organization of my Church and Priesthood and the accomplishment of my work. Fear me and observe my laws and I will reveal unto you, from time to time, through the channels that I have appointed, everything that shall be necessary for the future development and perfection of my Church, for the adjustment and rolling forth of my kingdom, and for the building up and establishment of my Zion. For ye are my Priesthood and I am your God. Even so. Amen.
April 28, 1883	John Taylor Revelations	
You have asked Me why your mind was confused and dull within the last two days. Verily thus saith the LORD, by the whisperings of His Spirit, and the still small voice, that the arrangement which you have contemplated with My servant Thomas is not acceptable to Me. He should have listened to your offer, which would have been profitable to himself and acceptable to Me. When you rejected his offer, you did right, and My Spirit was with you. But when you, in your zeal to show that you had faith in Me and in My word, accepted propositions and assumed responsibilities which were not in accordance with the order that I showed you, you did wrong, and I withdrew My Spirit. For it is forbidden My Presidency to go into debt unless I, the LORD, command it; for these things lead to confusion and bondage. Besides, have I not shown unto you, My servant John, a way to raise a fund which should be at your disposal for the accomplishment of My purposes? And by which the rights and properties of My people should be preserved in all of these matters? You must abide by this principle. My servant Thomas does not understand this matter. Confer with him on this subject, and if he can see these things and follow counsel, he shall assist you in the developments contemplated. For you, nor My servant George Q. Cannon, cannot attend to these details; but if he, Thomas, cannot enter freely into this matter without restraint, then shall you arrange with him according to wisdom, and withdraw from the consummation of the contemplated arrangement. Behold, I have shown unto you many things, and I will continue to make know unto you My will, from time to time, on things temporal as well as spiritual; things pertaining to My church, My kingdom, and My Zion. And you shall be My mouthpiece, saith the LORD, and I will greatly bless you, and lift you up, and exalt you, saith the LORD. For your words and works are acceptable unto Me, and I know of your zeal and integrity in My cause, and you shall be made a blessing to My people, and your name shall be honored in Israel, and in this nation, and among the nations of the earth; for they that honor Me, I will honor. And I will also greatly bless My servant George Q. Cannon, who is acceptable before Me, and who is exceedingly desirous to do My will. And I will also bless My servant Joseph F. Smith, whose heart and spirit are right before Me, and who is also desirous to fulfill My law. And these your counselors shall be greatly blessed with you; and you shall be My mouthpiece unto them, and I will show unto them My will from time to time. And you shall be one in spiritual things and also in temporal things in due time. And I will show unto My people, and unto the world, that this world is Mine, and that I created it by My power—and the gold and silver and copper and brass and iron and riches and precious things thereof, and all that pertains thereunto are Mine—and My people shall know that they are Mine, and that they live in Me, and move and exist in Me, and have their being from Me, and that all which they possess is Mine, and is obtained of Me, and that they are, and can only be, stewards over that which I have given unto them to possess, and which they could not have only of Me and by Me; whether it relates to this earth and the fullness thereof—to wives, children, and friends, to gold, silver, houses, lands, riches and possessions pertaining thereto—or to thrones, principalities, powers, dominions and exaltations in My eternal kingdoms. And My Presidency shall be one, and the Twelve shall be one, and the Presidencies of Stakes and the High Councils shall be one. And all of My holy priesthood in their several quorums, standings, offices, and positions shall be one, and all of My priesthood shall be united as one. And they shall be one with My people, and My people shall be one with them. And I will be one with them, and be their God. Let every person, therefore, be diligent and act in their several positions, callings or priesthood, and honor and magnify the same, and honor and obey Me, the Lord their God, and respect and obey the counsels of My holy priesthood, and I will honor and exalt them, saith the LORD, in time and throughout eternity. And as it regards My servant John Taylor, it is not necessary for him to attend to the minutia or details of either spiritual or temporal things, but only to give general directions, or as I may manifest from time to time. And his counselors are to be his assistants—and the First Presidency shall call upon the Twelve, the presidents of stakes, the bishops, and others to assist in these duties. And I will raise up wise and prudent men, from time to time, to assist in temporal as well as spiritual things, for they are all one with Me. And then let the Twelve call upon the Seventies, and let the high priests, the councils, the elders, and bishops and the lesser priesthood, and all who labor for Zion, be diligent and obedient. And let every man put in his sickle and reap, and fulfill and magnify his calling, office or Priesthood. These things belong to My priesthood, but more properly to the School of the Prophets. Let the School of the Prophets be organized, even all such as are worthy. But if they are found unworthy, they shall not have a place in My school—for I will be honored by My priesthood. And let My laws be made known unto them as may be deemed expedient.
May 1884	“Revelations given to John Taylor, 1882–1884”	The Logan Utah Temple had just been officially dedicated, and President Taylor sought the Lord's will concerning the furnishings and dedication of the House of the Lord.
As thou hast asked Me concerning this temple, thus saith the LORD: I accept this house which thou hast built; and also the labors of the Committee, the Superintendent, and the Architect thereof, and of those who have in anywise contributed to the building or beautifying the same, by their labor or by their means; and inasmuch as it shall be preserved pure and not by defiled, My presence shall be there, even the power of My Spirit, the Gift of the Holy Ghost; which shall in this house hereafter be more fully understood; and I will acknowledge the ordinances which shall be administered therein, both for the living and the dead; and My blessings shall attend the administration of the ordinances, and shall rest upon those who administer therein, inasmuch as they comply with the order of My house, and act with purity and singleness of heart before Me, according to My word, My ordinances and My law; and this house shall be a house of prayer, a house of learning, a house of God, wherein many great principles pertaining to the past, to the present, and the future shall be revealed. And My word and My will be made known, and the laws of the universe, pertaining to this world and other worlds be developed; for in these houses which have been built unto Me, and which shall be built, I will reveal the abundance of those things pertaining to the past, the present, and the future—to the life that now is, and the life that is to come, pertaining to law, order, rule, dominion, and government; to things affecting this nation and other nations. The laws of the heavenly bodies in their times and seasons, and the principles or laws by which they are governed, and their relation to each other, and whether they be bodies Celestial, Terrestrial, or Telestial shall all be made known as I will, saith the LORD. For it is My will and My purpose to place My people in closer communion with the heavens, inasmuch as they will purify themselves and observe more diligently My law; for it is in Mine heart to greatly bless and exalt My people, and to build up, exalt, and beautify My Zion, inasmuch as they shall observe My law. Even so, Amen.
December 25, 1884	John Taylor Revelations	
There are some things that ought to be put right. Some time ago there was word given for the brethren and their families to put themselves in order before the LORD. And it is necessary that these things should be carried out, for there has been a negligence in some of these matters. And if My people and priesthood desire My blessing and guidance and protection, they must and shall be subject to My law. And it is necessary that the various quorums of the Priesthood should place themselves right before Me, saith the LORD. And that as individuals they should place themselves in that position, for if they do not they have no claim upon My blessing or My protection. A day of trouble and anxiety and sorrow and judgment will soon overtake this nation, and other nations—it is nigh at hand. And the inhabitants of Zion must purge themselves from iniquity, folly, covetousness, and vanity, and listen to and obey My laws, or they cannot have My protection—for I the LORD will not be mocked. But the wrongdoer shall receive the just recompense of reward; and the sinners in Zion shall be afraid; and fearfulness shall also take hold of the wicked and the ungodly that are in your midst. And if you, My people, obey My law, and keep My commandments to do them, not in name only, but in reality, I will be your shield and protector, and your strong tower—and no man shall be able to hurt you, for I will be your defense. Therefore, humble yourselves before Me, and purify yourselves that your acts and doings may be acceptable before Me. For if you do not, you will share in the condemnation of the wicked. Therefore, listen to the counsels of those whom I have appointed, and seek not your own will and way, but the will of the Lord your God. For by Him only can you be sustained in the time of trouble which is fast approaching. Even so, Amen.
September 27, 1886	Handwritten revelation	see main 1886 Revelation
Facsimile of John Taylor's handwritten revelation 1886 Revelation Given to President John Taylor September 27, 1886 My son John, you have asked me concerning the New and Everlasting Covenant how far it is binding upon my people. Thus saith the Lord: All commandments that I give must be obeyed by those calling themselves by my name unless they are revoked by me or by my authority, and how can I revoke an everlasting covenant, for I the Lord am everlasting and my everlasting covenants cannot be abrogated nor done away with, but they stand forever. Have I not given my word in great plainness on this subject? Yet have not great numbers of my people been negligent in the observance of my law and the keeping of my commandments, and yet have I borne with them these many years; and this because of their weakness—because of the perilous times, and furthermore, it is more pleasing to me that men should use their free agency in regard to these matters. Nevertheless, I the Lord do not change and my word and my covenants and my law do not, and as I have heretofore said by my servant Joseph: All those who would enter into my glory must and shall obey my law. And have I not commanded men that if they were Abraham's seed and would enter into my glory, they must do the works of Abraham. I have not revoked this law, nor will I, for it is everlasting, and those who will enter into my glory must obey the conditions thereof; even so, Amen.

== Revelations to Wilford Woodruff ==
Date	Source document	Notes
October 2, 1840	Wilford Woodruff Journal	Revelation received while Wilford Woodruff was serving in the British Mission with the Quorum of Apostles.
Elder Kimball & myself arose from our bed in the morning with the power of God resting upon us yea the Spirit of God is like fire shut up in my bones. O my God. why is thy Spirit thus upon me why is mine eyes this morning a fountain of tears what art thou about to do O my God that causes this thing. I ask the[e] father to tell it unto me in the name of Jesus Christ thy Son. Thus saith the Lord God unto thee my servant Willford this is my Spirit that resteth upon thee to enlighten thy mind to show the things to com[e] not ownly upon thee but upon all my faithful servants upon the face of the whole earth therefore lift up thy voice & spare not for I am about to perform a great work upon the face of the earth saith the Lord, mine indignation is about to be poured out without mixtur[e] upon the heads of this nation & all the nations of the earth & they shall not escape, the cry of the poor, the wedow & orphan is assending into mine ears saith the Lord & I am about to avenge the cry of mine elect by laying low the oppresser & executing the decree of mine heart upon all the ungodly from among men therefore I put my spirit upon the[e] & say unto thee lift up thy voice & spare not & call upon all men to repent that come within the sound of thy voice & many souls shall be given unto the[e] & great shall be thy reward & eternal shall be thy glory Saith the Lord.
October 19, 1855	Wilford Woodruff Journal	As Wilford Woodruff prepared for a conference in October 1855, he prayed for guidance, asking what he and his brethren should teach the people.
After retireing to bed I prayed to the Lord to show me what we should teach the People and I received for answer Let my servants obtain the Holy Ghost & keep my spirit with them & that will instruct them what to teach the people continually & instruct the people to keep my spirit with them & they will be enabled to understand the word of the Lord when it is taught them.
December 29, 1875	Deseret News	
The word of the Lord to me is that it is time for Zion to rise and let her light shine; and the testimony of the Spirit of God to me is that this whole kingdom, this great kingdom of priests, this forty thousand men: In these mountains of Israel, who have borne the priesthood, have thoroughly fulfilled one part of the parable of the ten virgins. What is that? Why, that while the Bridegroom has tarried we have all slumbered and slept; as a church and kingdom we have slumbered and slept, and the word of the Lord to me is that we have slept long enough; and we have the privilege now of rising and trimming our lamps and putting oil in our vessels. This is the word of the Lord to me. The word of the Lord to me again, is that it is time for this whole people, these forty thousand elders of Israel who dwell in these valleys of the mountains, and I believe that it is the word of the Lord to them, that we listen to the voice of the Lord through the lawgiver, and unite ourselves in temporal things, and that we labor to build up the kingdom of God, and cease to labor to build up ourselves alone, against the interests of the kingdom of God. This is the word of the Lord to me and I think it is to you.
February 23, 1877	Wilford Woodruff Journal	
While meeting at the altar I received a revelation concerning the redemption of my dead. A few days ago I went into the Cealing room whare I often go to pray for I consider there is no spot on this Ear[t]h more acceptable tha[n] this Temple and while there I went befor the Lord with this subject resting upon my mind And I prayed the Lord to open My way to see my Dead Redeemed, And while I prayed the spirit of the Lord rested upon me and conveyed the following Testimony to me. Let my servant Wilford call upon the virgins Maidens, Daughters, & Mothers in Zion and let them Enter into my ^Holy^ Temple on the 1 day of March the day that my servant Wilford has seen the time alloted to man, Three score years and Ten, and there let them received their washing and Anontings and Endowments for and in behalf of the wives who are dead and halve been sealed to my servant Wilford, or those who are to be sealed to him, and this shall be acceptable unto me Saith the Lord, and the dead of my servant shall be redeemed in the spirit world and be prepared to meet my servant at the time of his coming which shall be at the time appointed unto him, though not revealed to man in the flesh [Mark 13:32], Now go to and perform this work and all shall be accomplished according to the desire of your heart.
January 26, 1880	Wilford Woodruff Journal (December 28, 1880)	The Sunset Wilderness Revelation
A Revelation given to Wilford Woodruff in the wilderness of San Francisco Mountain in Arizona On the 26 day of Jan 1880. Thus saith the Lord unto my servant Wilford Woodruff. I have heard thy Prayers, And will answer thy Petitions. I will make Known unto thee my will concerning the Nation who encumber the land of promise. And also concerning Zion, and her inhabitants. I have already revealed my will co[nce]rning the Nation through the mouth of my servant Joseph, who sealed his Testimony with his own Blood, which Testimony has been in force upon all the world from the hour of his death. What I the Lord have revealed in that Testiment and decreed upon this Nation, and all the Nations of the Earth shall be fulfilled, saith the Lord of Hosts. I the Lord have spoken and will be obeyed. My Purposes shall be fulfilled upon this Nation, and No power shall stay my hand. The hour is at the door when my wrath and indignation shall be poured out upon the wicked of this Nation. Their murders, blasphemies, Lyings, whoredoms and abominations have come up before my face and before the heavens and the wrath of mine indignation is full. I have decreed Plagues to go forth and lay waste mine Enemies, and not many years hence they shall not be left to pollute mine heritage. The Devil is ruling over his Kingdom and my spirit has no place in the harts of the Rulers of this Nation, and the Devil stirs them up to defy my Power, and to make war upon my Saints. Tharefore let mine Apostles and mine Elders who are faithful obey my commandments which are already written for your profit and guideance. Thus saith the Lord Unto my servant John Taylor and my servant Wilford Woodruff and my servant Orson Pratt and to all the residue of mine Apostles. Have you not gone forth in my name without Purse or scrip [Doctrine and Covenants 84:78] and declared the Gospel of Life and Salvation unto this Nation and the Nations of the Earth and warned them of the judgments which are to come as you have been moved upon by the power of the Holy Ghost and the inspiration of the Lord. You have done this year by year for a whole Generation as Men count time. Tharefore your garments are clean of the Blood of this generation and Esspecially of this Nation. Tharefore as I have said in a former commandment so I the Lord say again unto mine Apostles go ye alone by your selves whether in heat or in cold and clens your feet with water pure water, it matters not whether it be by the running stream or in your clossetts but bear their testimonies befor the Lord and the Heavenly Hosts And when you have all done this Then gather yourselves to gether in your Holy places and cloth yourselves in the Robes of the Holy Priesthood and thare offer up your Prayers according to my Holy Law Let him who Presides be mouth and Kneel upon the Holy Alter and there let mine Apostles bring all these testimonies before my face and before the Heavenly Hosts and before the justified spirits made perfect. And thus saith the Lord unto you mine Apostles when you bring these testimonies before me, let them be presented by Name as far as the spirit shall present them unto you. The Presidents of the United States, The Supreme Court, The Cabinet, The Senate & House of Congress of the United States The Govornors of the States and Territories The judges & officers sent unto you and all men & persons who have taken any part in persecuting you or Bringing distress upon you or your families or have sought your lives or sought to hinder you from keeping my commandments or from Enjoying the rights which the Constitutional Laws of the Land guarantee unto you. And what I the Lord say unto you mine Apostles I say unto my servants the seventies, The High Priests The Elders and the Priests And all my servants who are pure in hart and who have born testimony unto this Nation Let them go forth & cleanse their feet in pure water and bear testimony of it unto your Father who is in heaven And thus saith the Lord unto mine Apostles and mine Elders when ye do these things with Purity of heart, I the Lord will hear your Prayers and am bound by oath and Covenant to defend you and fight your battles as I have said in a former Commandment it is not my will that mine Elders should fight the Battles of Zion for I will fight your Battle [Exodus 14:14] Nevertheless Let no Man be afraid to lay down his life for my sake for He that layeth down his life for my sake shall find it again and have Eternal life [Matthew 16:25]. The Nation is ripened in iniquity and the cup of the wrath of mine indignation is full, and I will not stay my hand in Judgment upon this Nation or the Nations of the Earth I have Decreed wars and Judgments upon the wicked and my wrath and indignation are about to be poured out upon them And the wicked and rebellious shall know that I am God. As I the Lord have spoken so will I the Lord fullfill. I will spare none who remain in babylon but I will burn them up Saith the Lord of Hosts. As I the Lord have suffered so will I put all Enemies under my feet, for I the Lord utter my word, and it shall be obeyed and the day of wrath and indignation shall come upon the wicked. And I say again wo unto that Nation or House or people, who seek to hinder my People from obeying the Patriarchal Law of Abraham which leadeth to a Celestial Glory which has been revealed unto my Saints through the mouth of my servant Joseph for whosoever doeth those things shall be damned saith the Lord of Hosts and shall be broaken up & wasted away from under Heaven by the judgments which I have sent forth and shall not return unto me void And thus with the sword and By Bloodshed and with famine & Plagues and Earthquakes and the Thunders of Heavens and the vivid lightnings shall this Nation and the Nations of the Earth be made to feel the Chastning hand of an Almighty God untill they are broaken up and Destroyed, and wasted away from under heaven, and No power can stay my hand. Therefore let the wicked tremble. Let them that blaspheme my name hold their lips, for destruction will swiftly overtake them. All that I the Lord have Spoken through the Mouth of my Prophets and Apostles since the world began concerning the Last dispensation and fulness of times, concerning my Church which has been called out of the wilderness of darkness and Error, and concerning the Zion and Kingdom of God and concerning Babylon the Great, And what I have spoken through the Mouth of My servant Joseph shall all be fulfilled And though Heaven and Earth Pass away my words shall not pass away, but shall all be fulfilled Saith the Lord [Matthew 24:35]. These revelations and testimonies you have before you. Let my Saints search the word of the Lord and treasure up wisdom and be prepared for that which is to come As I have decreed so shall my Judgments begin at the House of God. There are those in my Church who have a name among you who are Adulterers and Adulteresses and those who blasphene my name and those who love and make a lie, and those who revel and Drink with the Drunken with the drunken if they do not speedy repent of their wickedness and Abominations They shall be severed from the ordinances of my house saith the Lord. There are many who have need to repent whose hearts are set upon the things of this world, who asspire to the honors of men, and do not honor the Priestood, nor seek to build up the Kingdom of God as they should Neither do they learn or comprehend that the rights of the Priesthood are inseparably connected with the Powers of heavens, and that the powers of heaven cannot be controlled nor handled ownly upon the principles of Righteousness, such should repent and turn unto the Lord and seek for the Holy Spirit to guide them judgments will begin at my House, and from thence will they go forth unto the wicked, and the wicked cannot Escape Blessed are the pure in heart [Matthew 5:8], for my Blessings await them in this life, and Eternal Life in the world to come Thus saith the Lord unto you my servants the Apostles who dwell in the flesh fear ye not your Enemies Let not your hearts be troubled I am in your midst I am your Advocate with the Father I have given mine Angels charge concerning you, mine Eyes are upon you, And the Eyes of your Heavenly Father and the Heavenly Hosts, and all Justified spirits made perfect are a watching over you. Your works are Manifest befor the face of my servants who have sealed their Testimony with their Blood and before all of my servants of the Twelve Apostles whom I have taken unto myself. The veil is taken from off their faces and they Know your works. They await your coming when you have finished your testimony in the flesh. Therefore be ye faithful untill I come. My coming is at the Door. Call upon the Lord in mighty prayer. Ask and you shall receive whatever you agree as touching anything and ask the Father in my name it shall be given unto you seek dilligently to build Up Zion and magnify your high calling and your Enemies shall not prevail over you Zion shall not be moved out of her place. Zion shall prevail against her Enemies. My people shall not be hindered in the building of my Temples unto my Holy Name if they will harken to my voice and do as I command them. The blood of my servant Joseph & Hyrum and of mine Apostles and Elders which have been shed for the word of God & Testimony of Jesus Christ cries from the ground for vengeance upon the Nation who have shed their blood but that Blood shall spedily be avenged and shall scease to cry unto me for the hour of Gods Judgmet is fully come and shall be poured out without measure upon the wicked. But Harken & hear O ye Apostles Elders & people of my Church to the word of the Lord concerning you that for all the Blessings that I will pour out upon you and the Inhabitants of Zion, and the Judgments and destructions upon the wicked that I will be inquired of by you to ask the Father in my name to do and to perform these things for you. As I told all the House of Israel by my servant Moses that they should ask at my hand for all those blessing which I the Lord had promised Unto Israel in the Latter Days. And as I the Lord Ordained mine Apostles who were with me in my ministry, and Promised them that they should sit upon Twelve Thrones Judging the Twelve Tribes of Israel [Matthew 10:1] [Matthew 19:28] So I say unto you mine Apostles whom I have raised up in these last days that I have ordained you to bear Record of my name and of the Gospel of Jesus Christ to the Gentiles first and then to the House of Israel. I have also Ordained you to set upon Thrones and Judge the Gentiles and all of the inhabitants of the Earth unto whom you have borne testimony of my name in the day and Generation in which you live Therefore how great is your calling and Responsibility befor me. Therefore gird up the Loins of your minds and Magnify your callings in the fear of God and prepare ye for the comming of the Son of Man which is nigh at the Door. No man knoweth the day nor the hour but the Signs of Both Heaven and Earth indicate his coming as promised by the Mouth of my deciples the fig trees are leaving and the hour is nigh Therefore prepare yourselves O ye Saints of the Most High God with Oil in your Lamps, for Blessed is he that watcheth for the coming of the Son of man [Matthew 25]. Again hear ye the word of the Lord O ye mine Apostles whom I have chosen in these last Days to bear record of my Name and to Lead my People Israel untill the coming of the Son of Man I the Lord have raised up unto you my Servant John Taylor to preside over you & to be a Law Giver unto my Church He has mingled his Blood with that of the Martered Prophets Nevertheless while I have taken my servants Joseph & Hyrum Smith unto myself I have preserved My Servant John Taylor for a wise purpose in me I have also taken many others of the Apostles unto Myself, for I take whom I will take and preserve in life them whom I will preserve according to the council of my own will. And while my servant John Taylor is your President I wish to ask the rest of my servants of the Apostles the Question Although you have one to Preside over your Quorum and over the Church which is the order of God in all Generations. Do you not all of you hold the Apostleship which is the Highest Authority ever given to man on Earth? You do. Therefore you hold in common the keys of the Kingdom of God in all the world you each of you have power to unlock the Veil of Eternity and hold convers[ation] with God the Father and his Son Jesus Christ, and to have the Administration of Angels. It is your right privilege & duty to inquire of the Lord his mind & will concerning yourselves the inhabitants of Zion and their interest And whenever any one of you receive the word of the Lord Let it be written and presented in your councils and whatever by a united consent you deem wisdom to be presented unto the people let it be presented by the President my servant John Taylor as the word of the Lord, in this way you will uphold him & strengthen his hands as all the burthen [burden] should not rest upon one man. For thus saith the Lord All of mine Apostles should be full of the Holy Ghost of Inspiration and Revelation and know the mind & will of God and be prepared for that which is to come Therefore let mine Apostles keep my commandments and obey my laws And the Gates of Hell shall not prevail against you Fear not for lo I am with you intill I come I come quickly Even so Amen.
November 24, 1889	Wilford Woodruff Journal	
Revelation given to Wilford Woodruff, Sunday Nov 24, 1889. Thus Saith the Lord, to my servant Wilford, I the Lord have heard thy prayers and thy request, and will answer thee by the voice of my spirit. Thus Saith the Lord, unto my servants the Presidency of my church, who hold the Keys of the Kingdom of God on this earth, I the Lord hold the destiny of the courts in your midst, and the destiny of this nation, and all other nations of the earth in mine own hands, and all that I have revealed, and promised and decreed concerning the generation in which you live, shall come to pass, and no power shall stay my hand. Let not my servants who are called to the Presidency of my church, deny my word or my law, which concerns the salvation of the children of men. Let them pray for the Holy Spirit, which shall be given them to guide them in their acts. Place not yourselves in jeopardy to your enemies by promise, your enemies seek your distruction and the distructions of my people. If the Saints will hearken unto my voice, and the counsel of my servants, the wicked shall not prevail. Let my servants, who officiate as your counselors before the courts, make their pleadings as they are moved upon by the Holy spirit, without any further pledges from the Priesthood. I the Lord will hold the courts, with the officers of government, and the nation responsible for their acts towards the inhabitants of Zion. I, Jesus Christ, the Savior of the world, am in your midst. I am your advocate with the Father. Fear not little flock, it is your father's good pleasure to give you the Kingdom. Fear not the wicked and ungodly. Search the scriptures, for they are they which testify of me, also those revelations which I have given to my servant Joseph, and to all my servants since the world began, which are recorded in the records of divine truths. Those revelations contain the judgments of God, which are to be poured out upon all nations under the heavens, which include Great Babylon. These judgments are at the door, they will be fulfilled as God lives. Leave judgment with me, it is mine saith the Lord. Watch the signs of the times, and they will show the fulfillment of the words of the Lord. Let my servants call upon the Lord in mighty prayer; retain the Holy Ghost as your constant companion, and act as you are moved upon by that spirit, and all will be well with you. The wicked are fast ripening in iniquity, and they will be cut off by the judgments of God. Great events await you and this generation, and are nigh at your doors. Awake, O, Israel, and have faith in God, and His promises, and he will not forsake you. I the Lord will deliver my Saints from the dominion of the wicked, in mine own due time and way. I cannot deny my word, neither in blessing nor judgments. Therefore let mine Anointed gird up their loins, watch and be sober, and keep my commandments. Pray always and faint not; exercise faith in the Lord and in the promises of God; be valient in the testimony of Jesus Christ. The eyes of the Lord and the Heavenly Hosts are watching over you and your acts. Therefore be faithful until I come. I come quickly to reward every man according to the deeds done in the body. Even so, amen.
November 14, 1891	Cache Stake Conference	Discussion of the revelation that led to the Manifesto
I have had some revelations of late, and very important ones to me, and I will tell you what the Lord has said to me. Let me bring your minds to what is termed the manifesto. … The Lord has told me to ask the Latter-day Saints a question, and He also told me that if they would listen to what I said to them and answer the question put to them, by the Spirit and power of God, they would all answer alike, and they would all believe alike with regard to this matter. The question is this: Which is the wisest course for the Latter-day Saints to pursue—to continue to attempt to practice plural marriage, with the laws of the nation against it and the opposition of sixty millions of people, and at the cost of the confiscation and loss of all the Temples, and the stopping of all the ordinances therein, both for the living and the dead, and the imprisonment of the First Presidency and Twelve and the heads of families in the Church, and the confiscation of personal property of the people (all of which of themselves would stop the practice); or, after doing and suffering what we have through our adherence to this principle to cease the practice and submit to the law, and through doing so leave the Prophets, Apostles and fathers at home, so that they can instruct the people and attend to the duties of the Church, and also leave the Temples in the hands of the Saints, so that they can attend to the ordinances of the Gospel, both for the living and the dead? The Lord showed me by vision and revelation exactly what would take place if we did not stop this practice. If we had not stopped it, you would have had no use for … any of the men in this temple at Logan; for all ordinances would be stopped throughout the land of Zion. Confusion would reign throughout Israel, and many men would be made prisoners. This trouble would have come upon the whole Church, and we should have been compelled to stop the practice. Now, the question is, whether it should be stopped in this manner, or in the way the Lord has manifested to us, and leave our Prophets and Apostles and fathers free men, and the temples in the hands of the people, so that the dead may be redeemed. A large number has already been delivered from the prison house in the spirit world by this people, and shall the work go on or stop? This is the question I lay before the Latter-day Saints. You have to judge for yourselves. I want you to answer it for yourselves. I shall not answer it; but I say to you that that is exactly the condition we as a people would have been in had we not taken the course we have. … I saw exactly what would come to pass if there was not something done. I have had this spirit upon me for a long time. But I want to say this: I should have let all the temples go out of our hands; I should have gone to prison myself, and let every other man go there, had not the God of heaven commanded me to do what I did do; and when the hour came that I was commanded to do that, it was all clear to me. I went before the Lord, and I wrote what the Lord told me to write.
1893	John Lee Jones, Biography	Revelation concerning the dedication of the Salt Lake City Temple
President Wilford Woodruff told some of the Saints that our Saviour had appeared unto him in the East Room in the Holy of Holies and told him that He had accepted of the [Salt Lake City] Temple and of the dedication services. He told President Woodruff that the Lord forgave us His Saints who had assisted in any manner towards the erection and completion of the Temple, that our sins were forgiven us by the Lord Jesus Christ.… Seek for the Spirit of God and we shall triumph. He said that if the Saints would be faithful, their sins should be blotted out.
May 28, 1894	Latter-day Saints’ Millennial Star	Revelation on the Law of Adoption
You have acted up to all the light and knowledge that you have had; but you have now something more to do than what you have done. We have not fully carried out those principles in fulfillment of the revelations of God to us, in sealing the hearts of the fathers to the children and the children to the fathers. I have not felt satisfied, neither did President Taylor, neither has any man since the Prophet Joseph who has attended to the ordinance of adoption in the temples of our God. We have felt that there was more to be revealed upon this subject than we had received. Revelations were given to us in the St. George Temple, which President Young presented to the Church of God. Changes were made there, and we still have more changes to make, in order to satisfy our Heavenly Father, satisfy our dead and ourselves. I will tell you what some of them are. I have prayed over this matter, and my brethren have. We have felt, as President Taylor said, that we have got to have more revelation concerning sealing under the law of adoption. Well, what are these changes? One of them is the principle of adoption. … When I went before the Lord to know who I should be adopted to (we were then being adopted to prophets and apostles), the Spirit of God said to me, “Have you not a father, who begot you?” “Yes, I have.” “Then why not honor him? Why not be adopted to him?” “Yes,” says I, “that is right.” I was adopted to my father, and should have had my father sealed to his father, and so on back; and the duty that I want every man who presides over a temple to see performed from this day henceforth and forever, unless the Lord Almighty commands otherwise, is, let every man be adopted to his father. When a man receives the endowments, adopt him to his father; not to Wilford Woodruff, nor to any other man outside the lineage of his fathers. That is the will of God to this people. … In my prayers the Lord revealed to me, that it was my duty to say to all Israel to carry this principle out, and in fulfillment of that revelation I lay it before this people. I say to all men who are laboring in these temples, carry out this principle, and then we will make one step in advance of what we have had before. … We want the Latter-day Saints from this time to trace their genealogies as far as they can, and to be sealed to their fathers and mothers. Have children sealed to their parents, and run this chain through as far as you can get it. When you get to the end, let the last man be adopted to Joseph Smith, who stands at the head of the dispensation. This is the will of the Lord to this people, and I think when you come to reflect upon it you will find it to be true.

== See also ==
- List of prophecies of Joseph Smith
