= Thomas Thayer (disambiguation) =

Thomas Thayer may refer to:

- Thomas Thayer (1812–1886), American theologian
- Tom Thayer (born 1961), American football player
- Tommy Thayer (born 1960), American musician

== See also ==
- Thomas Thayre, English medical writer
