= 1886 Revelation =

On the permanence of polygamy, used by Mormon fundamentalists

In the Mormon fundamentalist movement, the 1886 Revelation is the text of a revelation purportedly received by John Taylor, third President of the Church of Jesus Christ of Latter-day Saints (LDS Church), on September 27, 1886, which restated the permanence of the principle of plural marriage. Along with Joseph Smith's 1843 revelation on plural marriage, the 1886 revelation is one of the primary documents used by Mormon fundamentalists to justify their continued practice of polygamy.

The LDS Church issued a "manifesto" in 1890 to end official church sanction of new plural marriages, and a second manifesto in 1904 to more forcefully terminate the practice of new plural marriages. The mainline LDS Church has often claimed that the 1886 revelation is not authentic, but also maintains that even if authentic, the revelation was never publicly announced nor adopted as binding by the full Church.

In June 2025, debate as to the authenticity and provenance of the revelation was settled, as the LDS Church History Catalog published the full text of the revelation, including facsimiles of the original materials in John Taylor's hand, which the Church has held in its archives since 1933. Along with the handwritten original revelation were further materials, including transcriptions of the revelation and a memo explaining how the First Presidency of Church came to receive the materials in 1933.

== History of the 1886 Revelation and its reception ==
=== Early discussion about the 1886 Revelation, its existence, provenance, and applicability ===
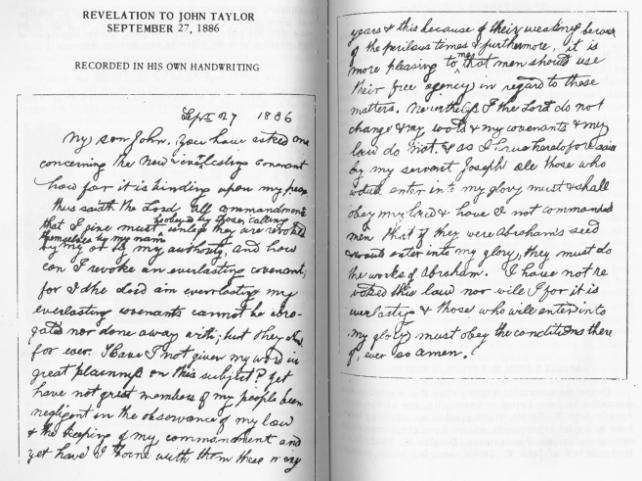
Facsimile of John Taylor's handwritten revelation

In February 1911, church leaders convened to discuss Church discipline for John W. Taylor, Taylor's son and a then-apostle who was being threatened with excommunication for opposing the church's shift in policy towards forbidding the practice of plural marriage. At this meeting, the younger Taylor told the leaders present that his father had "received a revelation which however was never presented to the Church." John W. Taylor claimed to have discovered the revelation among his father's papers, sometime after the elder Taylor's death in 1887.

As this example shows, previous to the full release of the original manuscript of the revelation in 2025, rumors, speculation, and partial releases of information about the revelation had made the rounds in the LDS and LDS fundamentalist communities.

For example, the LDS Archives' John Taylor Papers contains a copy of the original manuscript said to have been made by Joseph Fielding Smith on 3 August 1909.

LDS Apostle Melvin J. Ballard wrote in response to question from a Church member in 1934:

The pretended revelation of President John Taylor never had his signature added to it but was written in the form of a revelation and undoubtedly was in his hand writing; nevertheless it was never submitted to his own associates in the Presidency and the Twelve nor to the Church and consequently does not bind the Church in any sense.

In later decades, photographs of the original document were available, even though the existence and location of the original was unknown.

LDS historian Reed C. Durham said in informal remarks:

There was a revelation that John Taylor received and we have it in his handwriting. We've analyzed the handwriting. It is John Taylor's handwriting and the revelation is reproduced by the fundamentalists. That's supposed to prove the whole story because there was indeed a revelation. The revelation is dated September 27; that fits the account of a meeting, 1886.

Mormon historian D. Michael Quinn investigated an envelope prepared by John W. Taylor, which contained an unpublished revelation to his father on 19 November 1877 concerning the settlement of the Brigham Young estate. J. W. Taylor's handwritten note is dated to 22 October 1887 and claims that the envelope holds a number of other documents in addition to the 1877 revelation. The younger Taylor presented these documents, which supposedly included the 1886 revelation, to Wilford Woodruff in 1887. This envelope wound up in the Joseph F. Smith Papers within the Church Historian's Office, where Quinn had studied them in 1971. Quinn argues that the younger Taylor might have received back the original 1886 revelation document after leaving the Quorum of the Twelve, as they were later in the possession of his brother Frank Y. Taylor, who sent it to the First Presidency on 18 July 1933.

=== Importance of the 1886 Revelation to fundamentalist and polygamist Mormon organizers and groups ===
In 1912, Lorin C. Woolley, a Mormon fundamentalist leader, published a claim that five copies of the revelation had been made and entrusted to LDS Church apostle George Q. Cannon with the intent of preserving the practice for posterity.

According to Woolley, President Taylor was in hiding from federal marshals and in September 1886 took refuge in John W. Woolley's home in Centerville, Utah. On a Sunday afternoon, a delegation of LDS church officials visited President Taylor and urged him that the church ought to renounce plural marriage. That night, Taylor prayed on the matter and subsequently received a lengthy visitation from Jesus Christ and Joseph Smith, who instructed him to yield neither to federal nor internal pressures.

Woolley claimed he was reading Doctrine and Covenants in his room when he was "suddenly attracted to a light appearing under the door leading to President Taylor's room, and was at once startled to hear the voices of men talking there. There were three distinct voices." Woolley ran to the door out of concern for Taylor's well-being but found it bolted shut. Woolley was confused, but continued to stand by the door until morning, when Taylor emerged from his room with a "brightness of his personage." Taylor explained to him and the other men, who were all now at the door, "Brethren, I have had a very pleasant conversation all night with Brother Joseph [Smith]." Woolley questioned him about the voices and Taylor explained that the third one belonged to Jesus Christ.

Taylor then placed "each person under covenant that he or she would defend the principle of Celestial or Plural Marriage, and that they would consecrate their lives, liberty and property to this end, and that they personally would sustain and uphold the principle."

After telling these men of this experience, Taylor wrote the revelation down and had his secretary L. John Nuttall make five copies. At the urging of Taylor, all of those present entered into a "solemn covenant and promise that they would see to it that not a year should pass without plural marriages being performed and children born under the covenant."

Afterwards, Taylor set apart five individuals - John W. Woolley, Lorin C. Woolley, George Q. Cannon, Samuel Bateman, and Charles Henry Wilcken - for this calling. He also ordained all five of them save Cannon as apostles (as Cannon already was one), and then charged them with the responsibility to perpetuate plural marriage, regardless of whatever official Church practice might be.

These events, as retold by Woolley and others in attendance, became the founding basis for a number of groups that continued to practice polygamous marriage in secret. Most fundamentalist Mormon churches that continued to practice polygamy trace their origin and authority to this meeting, the 1886 Revelation, and the five individuals Taylor set apart on this occasion.

Some minor details of Woolley's story changed in the retelling, and these discrepancies form the basis of Mormon apologetic attacks on the veracity of his account and the underlying events. However, release in 2025 of the full text of the 1886 Revelation in Taylor's handwriting undermines the apologetic questions about Woolley's account. Apologetic scholars had long questioned the very existence of the revelation and authenticity of circulating copies.

Much of remainder of Woolley's account amounts to detail that he personally witnessed of the events surrounding the 1886 Revelation and which, regardless of its precise historical veracity, is accepted by many fundamentalist Mormon churches as their founding story and the ultimate basis for their existence and authority.

=== Release of facsimiles of 27 September 1886 revelation in June 2025 ===
In June 2025, the LDS Church History Catalog released facsimiles of materials held in its archives, including the full text of the 27 September 1886 revelation by John Taylor written in his own hand, along with transcriptions of the handwritten revelation and other associated materials.

Included among the materials is a statement by J. Reuben Clark explaining how the handwritten copy of the 1886 revelation had come into possession of the First Presidency in 1933 soon after the First Presidency had issued an Official Statement on subject of polygamy on June 17th.

The June 17th First Presidency statement called the 27 September 1886 revelation "pretended" and went on to say:

it should be said that the archives of the Church contain no such revelation; the archives contain no record of any such revelation, nor any evidence justifying a belief that any such revelation was ever given. From the personal knowledge of some of us, from the uniform and common recollection of the presiding quorums of the Church, from the absence in the Church archives of any evidence whatsoever justifying any belief that such a revelation was given, we are justified in affirming that no such revelation exists. Furthermore, insofar as the authorities of the Church are concerned, since this pretended revelation, if ever given, was never presented to and adopted by the Church or by any council of the Church . . . the said pretended revelation could have no validity and no binding effect and force upon Church members, and action under it would be unauthorized, illegal, and void.

The statement by J. Reuben Clark explains how, subsequent to this statement, the original copy of the revelation in John Taylor's hand was presented to the First Presidency:

After the issuance of the Official Statement of June 17, 1933 by the First Presidency, covering the matter of pretended polygamous or plural marriages, President Ivins stated to Presidents Grand and Clark that a report had come to him that Sister Nellie Taylor, one of the plural wives of John W. Taylor, was affirming that she had found among the papers of her husband, John W. Taylor, after his death, a paper on which was something written in the handwriting of the President John Taylor. Sister Taylor stated that she had turned over this paper to Brother Frank Y. Taylor.

President Grant spoke to Frank Y. Taylor about the matter . . .

About July 15, 1933 Frank Y. Taylor brought to President Grant the attached paper encased in the envelope which is attached to the paper.

This 2025 release of facsimiles of the revelation is the first acknowledgement by LDS Church leadership that the revelation was indeed authentic, written by John Taylor, and that the First Presidency has held the original handwritten revelation in its archives since 1933.

Some LDS Church leaders had, in fact, continued to maintain that the revelation is "concocted" as a "scheme" by "recalcitrant brethren," "a false revelation," only "allegedly given to President John Taylor in 1886" and not found anywhere within the LDS Church Archives - continuing these denials for decades after the revelation was in fact received in 1933.

The documents released in 2025 include the full handwritten revelation, written in John Taylor's hand, and corresponding to the text previously known and published as the 1886 revelation.

== Full text of the 1886 Revelation ==
The text of the revelation is as follows:

1886 Revelation
Given to President John Taylor September 27, 1886
My son John, you have asked me concerning the New and Everlasting Covenant how far it is binding upon my people.

Thus saith the Lord: All commandments that I give must be obeyed by those calling themselves by my name unless they are revoked by me or by my authority, and how can I revoke an everlasting covenant, for I the Lord am everlasting and my everlasting covenants cannot be abrogated nor done away with, but they stand forever.

Have I not given my word in great plainness on this subject? Yet have not great numbers of my people been negligent in the observance of my law and the keeping of my commandments, and yet have I borne with them these many years; and this because of their weakness—because of the perilous times, and furthermore, it is more pleasing to me that men should use their free agency in regard to these matters. Nevertheless, I the Lord do not change and my word and my covenants and my law do not, and as I have heretofore said by my servant Joseph: All those who would enter into my glory must and shall obey my law. And have I not commanded men that if they were Abraham’s seed and would enter into my glory, they must do the works of Abraham. I have not revoked this law, nor will I, for it is everlasting, and those who will enter into my glory must obey the conditions thereof; even so, Amen.

== See also ==
- List of non-canonical revelations in the Church of Jesus Christ of Latter Day Saints
- John Taylor revelation, 1886 September 27 (LDS Church History Library)
