= Prophecies attributed to Joseph Smith =

Joseph Smith, founder of the Latter Day Saint movement, is viewed by the movement's adherents as a prophet in the tradition of the ancient prophets recorded in the Bible. During his life, Smith made several prophecies, many documented in the Doctrine and Covenants, a book of scripture in several of the movement's denominations.

Non-Latter Day Saint sources have noted that a number of Smith's prophecies failed to come true. In 1841, Smith famously gave a public prophecy that Missouri Governor Lilburn Boggs would be violently killed within a year. Boggs was shot in an assassination attempt on May 6, 1842, but his injuries were not fatal and Boggs recovered. Boggs died years later, on March 14, 1860, of natural causes.

== Views ==
=== Latter Day Saint views ===
Members of the largest Latter Day Saint denomination, the Church of Jesus Christ of Latter-day Saints (LDS Church), regard Smith as a prophet who correctly predicted the rise of their church. They state that Smith predicted he would find "three witnesses to the word of God", and later found three men who would corroborate his story of the plates. After his loss in the 1838 Mormon War, Smith correctly predicted that he and his fellow prisoners would not be killed; the group were allowed to escape custody and flee to Illinois. Smith prophesied that Mormon enforcer Porter Rockwell would never be harmed by bullet or blade; though he violently killed others and was repeatedly charged with murder, Rockwell died in his home of natural causes.

For most of Latter Day Saint history, Smith's most famously cited prediction by adherents was an 1832 prophecy on war. Recorded on December 25, 1832, it was first published as part of the Pearl of Great Price in 1851 and formally canonized in 1876 as scripture in the Doctrine in Covenants. The prophecy stated that war would occur between the Northern states and the Southern states, beginning at South Carolina, spreading to involve Great Britain and other nations, and eventually protracting into a world war that would result in the end of all nations; in addition, it predicted slave and indigenous uprisings. At the time, South Carolina and the federal government of the United States were at odds amid the nullification crisis, but it was peacefully resolved in March 1833. A manuscript version of the revelation recorded by Oliver Cowdery in 1835 reads that the conflict will instead arise "out of rebellions like unto the one of South Carolina." In 1843, Smith restated his position that "in the Name of the Lord God... bloodshed preparatory to the coming of the son of man will commence in South Carolina." Adherents argue that the prophecy was fulfilled through the American Civil War and the attack on Fort Sumpter, however critics argue that conditions for fulfillment, such as British intervention in the Civil War, have largely not been met.

=== Non-Latter Day Saint views ===
Non-Latter Day Saint sources note many of Smith's predictions failed to come true. Smith predicted that his firstborn son would one day translate the Golden Plates; the son died in infancy. During the Winter of 1829, Smith predicted that a buyer for the Book of Mormon copyright would be found in Canada, though the trip to Canada ultimately failed to result in a buyer. Smith later reported that some revelations are "of the devil".

In 1841, Smith publicly prophesied Missouri Governor Boggs would be assassinated within the year. This event occurred within the context of heated conflict between Mormons and Missourians. Boggs was shot by an unknown assailant on the evening of May 6, 1842. He was seriously injured but survived and lived until 1860, contradicting Smith's prediction. Porter Rockwell, an associate and bodyguard of Smith, was arrested on suspicion of the crime but ultimately released as a grand jury found no evidence of his involvement. Smith confidants John C. Bennett, Joseph Jackson, and William Law later reported that Smith had ordered Boggs be murdered.

Smith taught followers that they were living in the "latter days". Smith renamed the organization the "Church of Jesus Christ of Latter Day Saints" in 1838. In 1843, Smith reported a revelation telling him "Joseph, my son, if thou livest until thou art eighty-five years old, thou shalt see the face of the Son of Man". Smith opined "I believe the coming of the Son of Man will not be any sooner than that time".

Smith also prophesied the overthrowing of the government in consequence of permitting crimes committed in Missouri.

== List of known prophecies ==
=== Prophecies from 1823 to 1830 ===
Prophecy	Source	Date	Notes
Smith spoken of for good and evil among all nations, kindreds, and tongues: Smith wrote in 1838 that previously, in the year 1823, an angel visited him and made prophetic statements regarding Smith's future. "He called me by name, and said unto me that he was a messenger sent from the presence of God to me, and that his name was Moroni; that God had a work for me to do; and that my name should be had for good and evil among all nations, kindreds, and tongues, or that it should be both good and evil spoken of among all people."	Joseph Smith–History 1:33; History of the Church 1:11–12	September 21, 1823 (reported in 1838)	Latter-day Saints state that this prophecy has been fulfilled. As evidence, the LDS Church has cited discussions of Smith by American, German and Finnish scholars, as well as the church's extensive missionary program, which leads many people around the world to speak of Smith both positively and negatively.
Three witnesses to testify of the Book of Mormon: At the request of Martin Harris, who desired to witness the golden plates containing the Book of Mormon, Joseph Smith received the revelation that "the testimony of three witnesses would be sent forth of God's word." By the time the revelation was given, neither Oliver Cowdery nor David Whitmer (the two remaining witnesses and later supporters) had met Smith.	Section 5:15	March 1829	
Jesus comes to the temple: "I am Jesus Christ, the Son of God; wherefore, gird up your loins and I will suddenly come to my temple. Even so. Amen."	Section 36:8	December 9, 1830	
Copyright sale: Hiram Page and Oliver Cowdery were to find a buyer for copyright of the Book of Mormon in Canada.	B. H. Roberts, Comprehensive History of the Church, 1:165 (1930)	Winter 1829–30	Latter Day Saints state that the conditions precedent for the fulfilment of this prophecy were not satisfied. Page argued in an 1848 letter that the revelation was therefore fulfilled.
Gather in one place: The Latter-day Saints shall be gathered in one place "against the day when tribulation and desolation are sent forth upon the wicked"	Section 29:8	September 1830	Latter Day Saints state that this prophecy was fulfilled. Adherents recognize several meanings for "gathering", stemming from their concepts of Zion. Indeed, LDS Church general authorities have stated that the concept of gathering to Zion refers to the stakes of Zion wherever they are located, and not to a single geographic and physical location.
Hour is nigh: The "hour is nigh and day soon at hand" when Jesus will return.	Section 29:9-11	September 1830	Latter Day Saints state this prophecy has yet to be fulfilled. Adherents believe that Jesus has not yet returned in his Second Coming.

=== Prophecies from 1831 to 1832 ===
Prophecy	Source	Date	Notes
Land purchase: The Latter Day Saints were to gather riches and purchase a place of refuge and safety, where the wicked would not come, and the wicked would refuse to battle the Saints.	Section 45:64-74	March 7, 1831	Richard Abanes says this was not fulfilled.
Zion in Missouri: Missouri is named as the place for the "City of Zion"; the land will be purchased for "an everlasting inheritance".	Section 57:1-5	July 20, 1831	
Strong hold in Kirtland for the space of five years: Elder Frederick G. Williams should not sell his farm because "[The Lord wills] to retain a strong hold in the land of Kirtland, for the space of five years".	Section 64:21	September, 1831	
Zion in this generation: Zion and its temple will be built at Independence, Missouri, "in this generation".	Section 84:2	September 22 or 23, 1832	
New York destroyed: New York and Boston will be destroyed if they reject the gospel. The "hour of their judgement is nigh".	Section 84:114	September 22 or 23, 1832	According to Richard Abanes, this prophecy was not fulfilled because both cities still exist.
Civil War: there will be a war between the northern states and the southern states beginning in South Carolina; the southern states will call upon Great Britain for assistance; that after this, war will be "poured out on all nations"; and that "slaves shall rise up against their masters, who shall be marshaled and disciplined for war".	Section 87	December 25, 1832	Latter-day Saints believe that the American Civil War fulfilled this prophecy, in part: it was a war between the northern and the southern states, the war began in South Carolina, and the southern states did call upon the United Kingdom for military assistance. The prediction that after this, war would "be poured out upon all nations" is disputed, but Latter-day Saints argue that the wars that have occurred since the American Civil War—which include two world wars—adequately fulfill this prophecy.

=== Prophecies from 1833 to 1834 ===
Prophecy	Source	Date	Notes
Current generation: "Not many years shall pass away" before the wicked "of this generation" will be swept off the face of the earth; and "there are those now living upon the earth whose eyes shall not be closed in death until they see all these things, which I have spoken, fulfilled".	History of the Church 1:315	January 4, 1833	Critic Richard Abanes says this was not fulfilled.
Zion built here: Promise that if the Saints are obedient in building a temple, then the City of Zion will prosper and become glorious, and that Zion cannot "be moved" out of its place.	Section 97:15-20	August 2, 1833	
Stars fall from heaven: According to Philo Dibble, while preaching in Kirtland, Ohio, Smith said, "Forty days shall not pass and the stars shall fall from heaven."		October 5, 1833	
Enemies not destroyed: If the Saints were not successful in legal action against their enemies in Missouri, God would avenge them and all their adversaries would be destroyed.	History of Church 1:455	December 10, 1833	According to Richard Abanes, this was not fulfilled.
United Order: The United Order would be "everlasting", and "immutable and unchangeable" to benefit the church until Jesus comes.	Section 104:1	April 23, 1834	According to Richard Abanes, this prophecy was not fulfilled.
Missouri victory: Speaking through Smith, God says regarding Missouri: "I will fight your battles ... the destroyer I have sent forth to destroy and lay waste mine enemies; and not many years hence they shall not be left to pollute mine heritage, and to blaspheme my name upon the lands which I have consecrated for the gathering together of my saints".	Section 105:13	June 22, 1834	Richard Abanes says this prophecy was not fulfilled.
Zion in Missouri: The Latter-day Saints should be ready to move into Jackson County, Missouri, on September 11, 1836, "the appointed time for the redemption of Zion"	History of the Church 2:145	August 16, 1834	Richard Abanes says that this was not fulfilled: the Latter-day Saints fled Missouri in 1839.
Church to fill the world: As reported by Wilford Woodruff, Joseph Smith prophesied that "this Church will fill North and South America—it will fill the world.’”	As quoted in Teachings of Presidents of the Church: Wilford Woodruff.	Spring 1834	As of 2023, nominal membership in the LDS Church and other denominations number over 17 million. Nominal church growth has slowed from prodigious growth rates seen in the later 20th century.

=== Prophecies from 1835 to 1839 ===
Prophecy	Source	Date	Notes
Wind up in 56 Years "[T]he coming of the Lord, which is nigh—even fifty-six years should wind up the scene."	History of Church 2:182	February 14, 1835	Critic Richard Abanes says this prophecy was not fulfilled because the Second Coming of Jesus did not happen within 56 years of the statement. Latter-day Saints say that this was not necessarily a prophecy because it was not contained in a revelation and that Smith may have been expressing an opinion on the timing of the Second Coming.
Wealth from Salem: Smith would receive "wealth pertaining to gold and silver" in Salem, Massachusetts.	Section 111:4	August 4, 1836	
Marsh exalted: Apostle Thomas B. Marsh would be "exalted" and would preach "unto the ends of the earth ... among ... many nations".	Section 112:3-11	July 23, 1837	Marsh was excommunicated shortly afterwards.
Oliver Granger: "And again, I say unto you, I remember my servant Oliver Granger; behold, verily I say unto him that his name shall be had in sacred remembrance from generation to generation, forever and ever, saith the Lord."	Section 117:12-15	July 8, 1838	
During this captivity [in Liberty Jail], not one of our lives shall be taken: Smith said on the morning after their capture after the 1838 Mormon War that "the word of the Lord came to me last night that ... whatever we may suffer during this captivity, not one of our lives shall be taken".	Dona Hill, Joseph Smith: The First Mormon (Doubleday and Company, Garden City, New York, 1977) p. 244.	November 1838	
Enemies punished: While in prison, God stated through Smith that "cursed are all those that shall lift up the heel against mine anointed", that Smith's enemies would be taken "in their own craftiness", and that "not many years hence ... [they] and their posterity shall be swept from under heaven, saith God, that not one of them is left to stand by the wall".	Section 121:11	March 20, 1839	The meaning of this prophecy, its referenced target, and the extent of its fulfillment has long been controversial. Although some of the known persecutors of Smith met gruesome and ugly deaths, others died peacefully of old age. Critic Richard Abanes says this prophecy was not fulfilled.

=== Prophecies from 1840 to 1844 ===
Prophecy	Source	Date	Notes
Relief Society: "I now prophecy that before ten years shall roll around, the queens of the earth shall come and pay their respects to this society" [spoken at a Relief Society meeting].	D. Michael Quinn, The Mormon Hierarchy: Origins of Power, p. 634	April 28, 1842	According to Richard Abanes, this prophecy was not fulfilled.
Saints to settle in Rocky Mountains: "I prophesied that the Saints would continue to suffer much affliction and would be driven to the Rocky Mountains, many would apostatize, others would be put to death by our persecutors or lose their lives in consequence of exposure or disease, and some of you will live to go and assist in making settlements and build cities and see the Saints become a mighty people in the midst of the Rocky Mountains."	History of the Church 5:85	August 1842	Critics Jerald and Sandra Tanner say that this alleged prophesy was inserted into Smith's History after his death and that it was written in handwriting that does not match Smith's.
Smith will not return to Missouri : When Smith was captured by Missouri agents in Illinois, he stated that he would not set foot in Missouri again either dead or alive.	History of the Church 5:216	1842	
Rising Generation: "There are those of the rising generation who shall not taste death till Christ comes."	History of the Church 5:336	April 6, 1843	Critic Richard Abanes says this prophecy was not fulfilled.
White Horse Prophecy : A lengthy discourse in which Smith reportedly said, "You will see the Constitution of the United States almost destroyed. It will hang like a thread as fine as a silk fiber ... and it will be preserved and saved by the efforts of the White Horse"; and that the temple in Jackson County, Missouri, "will be built in this generation."	Journal of John J. Roberts, March 2, 1902	May 6, 1843	The Church of Jesus Christ does not accept the White Horse Prophecy as authentic.
Government Overthrown: "I prophesy in the name of the Lord God of Israel, unless the United States redress the wrongs committed upon the Saints in the state of Missouri and punish the crimes committed by her officers that in a few years the government will be utterly overthrown and wasted, and there will not be so much as a potsherd left for their wickedness."	History of the Church 5:394	May 18, 1843	Critic Richard Abanes says this prophecy was not fulfilled.
Stephen A. Douglas to run for president: Smith stated that Stephen A. Douglas would run for the presidency of the United States. Smith also predicted that if Douglas slandered the Latter-day Saints then he would feel the weight of the hand of the Almighty upon him.	History of the Church 5:394	May 1843	This prophecy was not published until 1856, when William Clayton claimed he had recorded it in his journal. Previously that same year, Douglas had tried and failed to get the Democratic nomination. A later compilation of Clayton's journals showed no mention of the prophecy from May 1843.
Stakes established in Boston and New York: "In the great cities, as Boston, New York, etc., there shall be stakes"	History of the Church 6:319		
Government broken up: "While discussing the petition to Congress, I prophesied, by virtue of the holy Priesthood vested in me, and in the name of the Lord Jesus Christ, that, if Congress will not hear our petition and grant us protection, they shall be broken up as a government, and God shall damn them. And there shall nothing be left of them—not even a grease spot."	Millennial Star 29:455; History of the Church 6:116	December 16, 1843	Critic Richard Abanes says this prophecy was not fulfilled.
Orrin Porter Rockwell protected from enemies: "I prophesy, in the name of the Lord, that you—Orrin Porter Rockwell—so long as ye shall remain loyal and true to thy faith, need fear no enemy. Cut not thy hair and no bullet or blade can harm thee."	Sonne, Kristen (June 21, 1998), "Rockwell's colorful history recounted", Deseret News, archived from the original on October 21, 2013	December 25, 1843	Latter-day Saints contend this prophecy was fulfilled: Rockwell died of natural causes at an old age, having never been wounded by a bullet or a blade. However he did cut his hair in 1855, several years after Joseph's statement, to make a wig for Agnes Smith, the widow of Don Carlos Smith, Joseph's younger brother.
Son David: Smith prophesied that his unborn child will be named David and will be "church president and king over Israel".	D. Michael Quinn, The Mormon Hierarchy: Origins of Power, p. 644	April–May 1844	Critic Richard Abanes says this prophecy was not fulfilled, as David did not become the president of the Community of Christ or any other Latter-day Saint church.
Dr. Richards will not have hole in garment: Shortly before his imprisonment in Carthage Jail, Smith told Willard Richards that the time would come that the balls would fly around him like hail, and he should see his friends fall on the right and on the left, but that there should not be a hole in his garment.	History of the Church 6:619	More than a year before June 1844	
Joseph and Hyrum Smith to die if re-captured: Five days before his death, Smith wrote: "I told Stephen Markham that if I and Hyrum were ever taken again we should be massacred, or I was not a prophet of God"	History of the Church 6:546	July 22, 1844	
Dan Jones to serve a mission to Wales: This is commonly referred to as Smith's "last prophecy" and took place in Carthage Jail the night before Smith was killed. "Soon after Dr. Richards retired to the bed ... and when all were apparently fast asleep, Joseph whispered to Dan Jones, 'are you afraid to die?' Dan said, 'Has that time come, think you? Engaged in such a cause I do not think that death would have many terrors.' Joseph replied, 'You will yet see Wales, and fulfill the mission appointed you before you die.'"	History of the Church 6:601	July 26 or 27, 1844	

-->

== See also ==
- List of non-canonical revelations in the Church of Jesus Christ of Latter Day Saints
- Miracles attributed to Joseph Smith
- One Mighty and Strong
