= White Horse Prophecy =

Possible prophetic statement made by Mormonism founder Joseph Smith

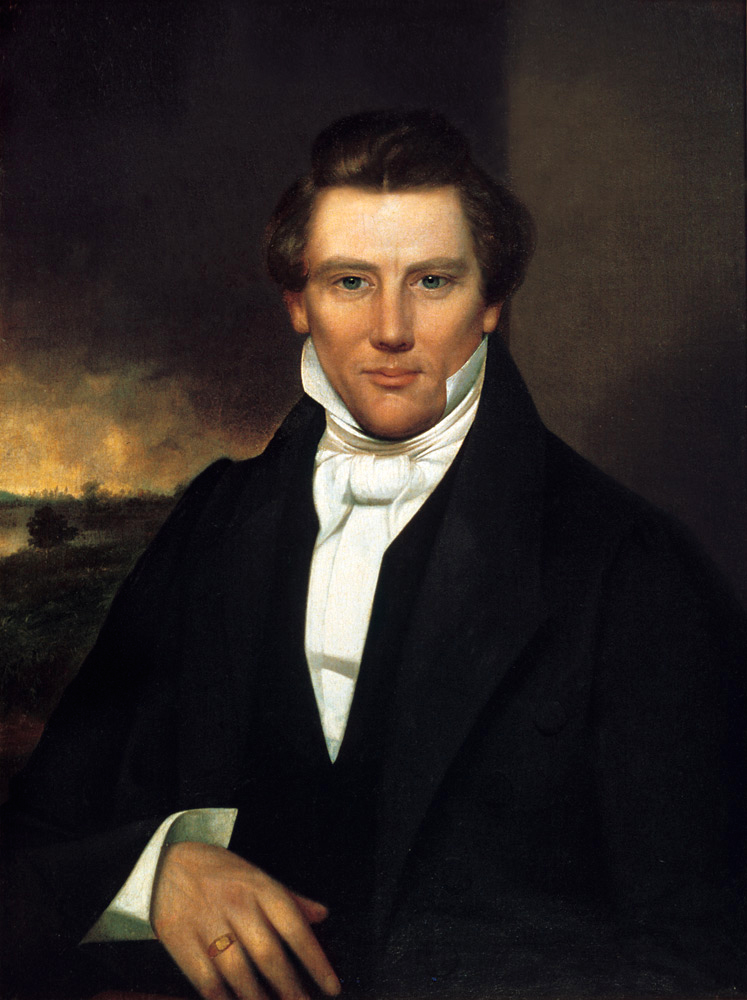
Joseph Smith, founder of Mormonism, reportedly made an 1843 statement which became known as the White Horse Prophecy.

The White Horse Prophecy is an influential, disputed version of a statement made by Latter Day Saint movement founder Joseph Smith in May 1843 on the future role of his followers in saving an endangered US Constitution. It was written down by one of Smith's adherents Edwin Rushton in an undated document, possibly ten years after, and separately recorded by follower James Burgess. Rushton's record of Smith's original statement predicts that the US Constitution will one day "hang by a thread" but be saved by members of the Church of Jesus Christ of Latter-day Saints (LDS Church), "by the efforts of the White Horse." According to Rushton's retelling of the prophecy, LDS adherents would "go to the Rocky Mountains and... be a great and mighty people," associating them with one of the biblical four Horsemen of the Apocalypse in the Book of Revelation. One source from the LDS Church's largest university Brigham Young University (BYU) believes the Rushton document was written after 1890.

On the basis of either Rushton's version or Smith's original statement, some critics of Mormonism and some Mormon folklore doctrine enthusiasts hold that Mormons should expect that the US will eventually become a theocracy dominated by the LDS Church. The idea that LDS members will at one or more times take action to save an imperiled US Constitution has since been restated by numerous top LDS leaders. Three years prior to the 1843 statement, Smith had similarly predicted the constitution would someday be "on the brink of ruin", but be saved by his followers. As to the Rushton version of the Prophecy, the Church stated in 2010 that "the so-called 'White Horse Prophecy'... is not embraced as Church doctrine". Numerous denominations within Mormon fundamentalists continue to preach the doctrine, and it remains influential in conservative Mormon political discussion, with multiple top LDS leaders citing similar teachings into modernity.

== Background ==
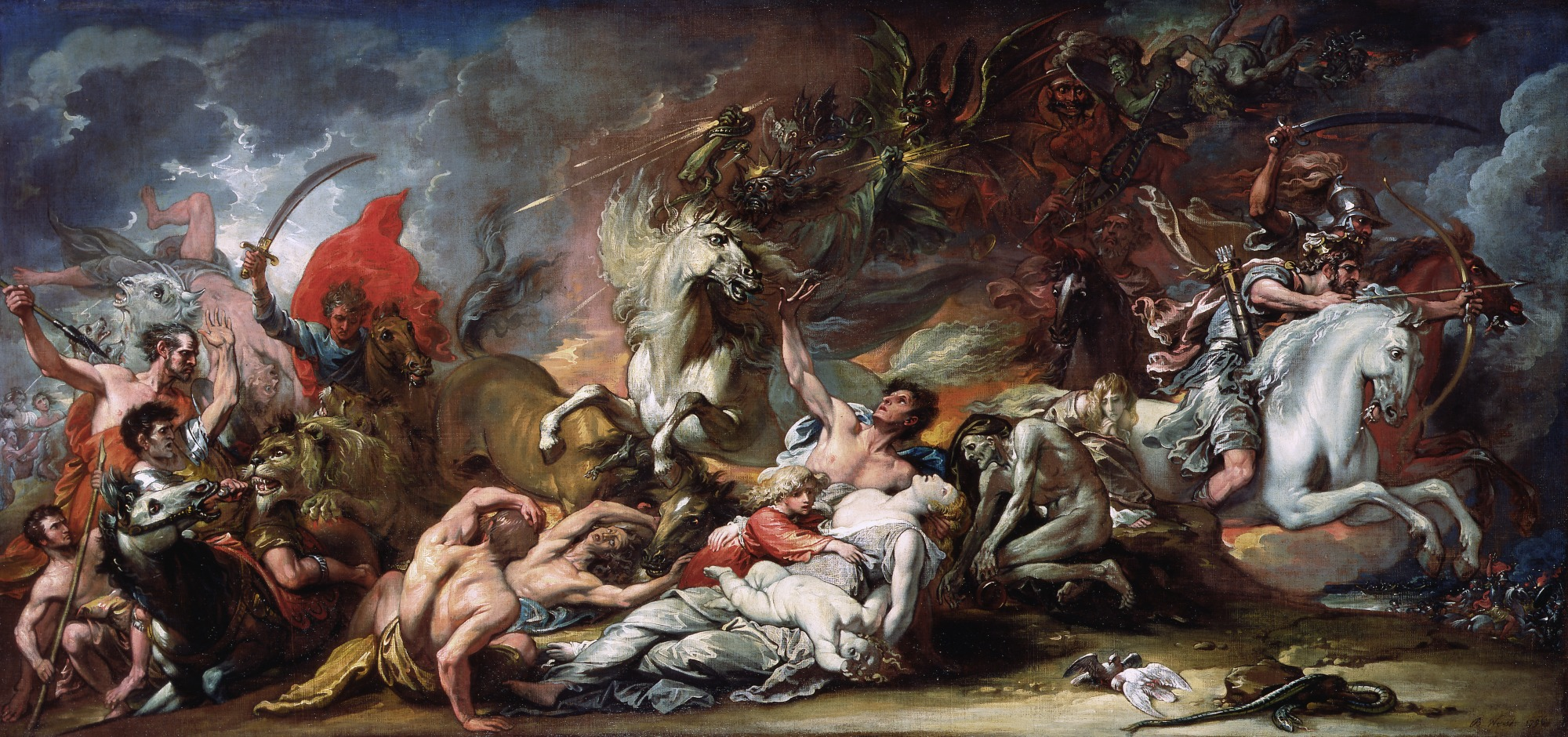
The painting Death on a Pale Horse by Benjamin West hung in Joseph Smith's reading room in 1844 for three days.

Smith went to Washington, DC, in November 1839 in an unsuccessful attempt to obtain help for his followers. Pat Bagley of the Salt Lake Tribune wrote that from then on, Smith and his followers "considered themselves the last Real Americans" and "the legitimate heirs of the pilgrims and Founding Fathers," who would be called upon one day to save the US Constitution. Smith is believed to have said in 1840 that when the Constitution hung by a thread, Latter Day Saint elders would step in "on the white horse" to save the country.

Joseph Smith is said to have made his statement in early May 1843, while his followers were headquartered in Nauvoo, Illinois. One of Smith's associates who recorded the statement was Edwin Rushton. The most complete copy of Rushton's version of Joseph Smith's statement is contained in a 1902 diary entry made by John Roberts of Paradise, Utah. That rendering asserted that in his statement, Smith had prophesied that the Mormons "will go to the Rocky Mountains and will be a great and mighty people established there, which I will call the White Horse of peace and safety." Smith added "I shall never go there" and predicted continued persecution by enemies of the church, and he reportedly said, "You will see the Constitution of the United States almost destroyed. It will hang like a thread as fine as a silk fiber.... I love the Constitution; it was made by the inspiration of God; and it will be preserved and saved by the efforts of the White Horse, and by the Red Horse who will combine in its defense." The meaning of the Red Horse is not stated in the prophecy.

According to the diary, Smith also said that Mormons would send missionaries to "gather the honest in heart from among the Pale Horse, or people of the United States, to stand by the Constitution of the United States as it was given by the inspiration of God." The account quotes Smith as predicting numerous wars involving Great Britain, France, Russia, China, and other countries, and saying that the European nobility "knows that [Mormonism] is true, but it has not pomp enough, and grandeur and influence for them to yet embrace it." He is also reported to have said that a temple that the Mormons had planned to build in Jackson County, Missouri "will be built in this generation."

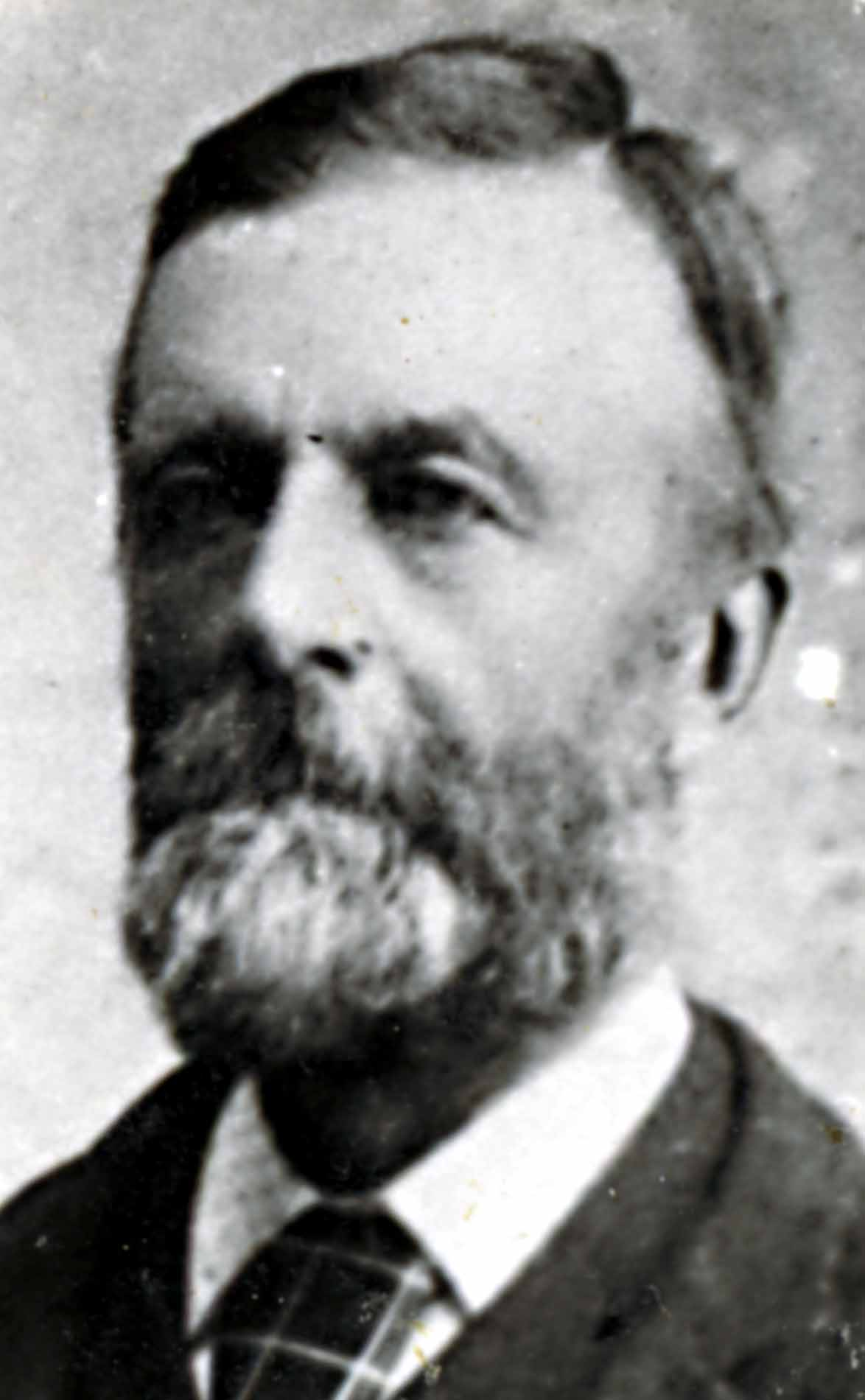
Edwin Rushton, ten years after the address, wrote down what would become known as the White Horse Prophecy.

In 1844, Smith rejected the platforms of the major candidates for president of the United States and decided to conduct his own third-party campaign which was cut short by his murder on June 27 that year. After a succession crisis in which Brigham Young was accepted as Smith's successor by the majority of Smith's adherents, the Mormon migration to the Intermountain West began, under Young's direction, in February 1846.

== Disputed authenticity ==
The authenticity of the White Horse Prophecy is much disputed. Most of its symbolistic content was not attested to during Smith's lifetime but was instead reported by Rushton years after Smith's death. Whereas a philosophical kernel in Rushton's version is confirmed by contemporary Church leaders as having been taught by Smith, Rushton's formulation, as a whole, has often been repudiated by the Church over the years since as early as 1918. An analysis of the White Horse Prophesy was included, along with mentions of its questioned authenticity in Prophecy: Key to the Future, by scriptural scholar and lay theologian Duane Crowther in 1962; and, more recently, the Prophecy has been referenced in the writings by Mormon fundamentalist Ogden Kraut.

In 1918, Joseph F. Smith, president of the LDS Church, dismissed the White Horse Prophecy as a "ridiculous story... and a lot of trash that has been circulated about... by two of our brethren who put together some broken sentences from [Joseph Smith] that they may have heard from time to time." In his 1966 book Mormon Doctrine, LDS theologian (and later apostle) Bruce R. McConkie wrote, "From time to time, accounts of various supposed visions, revelations, and prophecies are spread forth by and among the Latter-day Saints, who should know better than to believe or spread such false information. One of these false and deceptive documents that has cropped up again and again for over a century is the so-called White Horse Prophecy."

In early 2010, the LDS Church issued a statement stating that "the so-called 'White Horse Prophecy' is based on accounts that have not been substantiated by historical research and is not embraced as Church doctrine." That same year, LDS historian Don L. Penrod examined differences in two early handwritten accounts of the prophecy, reported some words and phrases that were not characteristic of Joseph Smith's speaking style or current in his time, and stated that Rushton had "in his elderly years recorded some things that [Smith] actually said, mixing in words of his own creation." It additionally noted that "memories of words and events, especially many years later, are often faulty."

== Similar statements ==
Several sources attribute to Smith the idea that the US Constitution would one day hang by a thread, and Church leaders have issued similar warnings about the Constitution.

=== Joseph Smith ===
In 1840 Smith stated the constitution would be "on the brink of ruin" and saved by his followers. Over a century later this statement was repeated by then church president Ezra Taft Benson in a 1986 BYU address and a 1987 general conference address. Smith later repeated the same idea in 1843 when he said, the Constitution would "hang by a brittle thread", but LDS adherents will save it. This statement was publicly repeated a decade later by one of his successors Brigham Young in 1854 and 1855.

=== Brigham Young ===
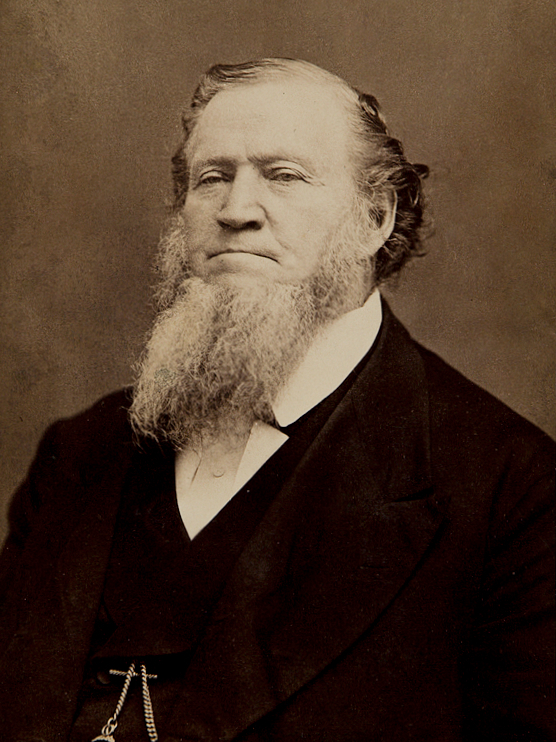
Brigham Young, one of Smith's primary successors, made similar prophecies in 1854 and 1855.

In 1854 Brigham Young quoted his predecessor stating "as Joseph Smith said, 'The time will come when the destiny of the nation will hang upon a single thread. At that critical juncture, this people will step forth and save it from the threatened destruction.' It will be so." He repeated this in 1855, predicting that "when the Constitution of the United States hangs, as it were, upon a single thread, they will have to call for the 'Mormon' Elders to save it from utter destruction; and they will step forth and do it."

=== Orson Hyde ===
In 1858, Orson Hyde, another contemporary of Smith, wrote that Smith believed "the time would come when the Constitution and the country would be in danger of an overthrow; and... if the Constitution be saved at all, it will be by the elders of Church."

=== Eliza R. Snow ===
In 1870, Eliza R. Snow, said at an LDS women's meeting, "I heard the prophet Joseph Smith say…that the time would come when this nation would so far depart from its original purity, its glory, and its love for freedom and its protection of civil and religious rights, that the Constitution of our country would hang as it were by a thread. He said, also, that this people, the sons of Zion, would rise up and save the Constitution and bear it off triumphantly."

=== Charles W. Nibley ===
In 1922, the Church's fifth presiding bishop, Charles W. Nibley, stated that "the day would come when there would be so much of disorder, of secret combinations taking the law into their own hands, tramping upon Constitutional rights and the liberties of the people, that the Constitution would hang as by a thread. Yes, but it will still hang, and there will be enough of good people, many who may not belong to our Church at all, people who have respect for law and for order, and for Constitutional rights, who will rally around with us and save the Constitution."

=== Melvin J. Ballard ===
In 1928, the apostle Melvin J. Ballard of the LDS Church remarked that "the prophet Joseph Smith said the time will come when, through secret organizations taking the law into their own hands... the Constitution of the United States would be so torn and rent asunder, and life and property and peace and security would be held of so little value, that the Constitution would, as it were, hang by a thread. This Constitution will be preserved, but it will be preserved very largely in consequence of what the Lord has revealed and what [the Mormons], through listening to the Lord and being obedient, will help to bring about, to stabilize and give permanency and effect to the Constitution itself. That also is our mission."

=== Joseph L. Wirthlin ===
In 1938 Joseph L. Wirthlin second counselor in the Church's Presiding Bishopric in the October 1938 general conference quoted Brigham Young, and then says, "We see from this prophecy, uttered by a prophet of God that there will yet devolve upon the Priesthood of this Church the responsibility of protecting the rights and the Constitution of our great country."

Then again in general conference in 1941 he says, "If our rights expire in a convulsion, the body politic now being slowly drugged by the opiate of a borrowed prosperity, will suffer a major financial operation, which will cause the death of the world's greatest democracy; and the vultures and the buzzards of some foreign "ism" will be waiting the moment to step in and devour the carcass" and then refers to the Brigham Young prophecy.

=== J. Reuben Clark ===
In 1942, J. Reuben Clark, an apostle and a member of the church's First Presidency, said that "You and I have heard all our lives that the time may come when the Constitution may hang by a thread.... I do know that whether it shall live or die is now in the balance." On the Constitution, Clark went on to cite its "free institutions," separation of powers, and the Bill of Rights. He added that "if we are to live as a Church, and progress, and have the right to worship... we must have the great guarantees that are set up by our Constitution" and "If we shall stand together we shall save the Constitution, just as has been foreseen".

=== Ezra Taft Benson ===
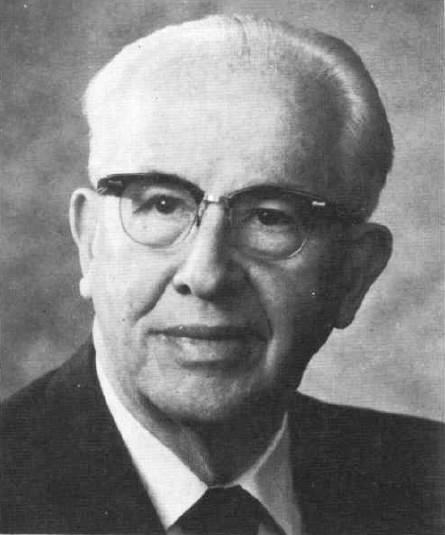
Church president Ezra Taft Benson quoted Joseph Smith's prophecy in a 1987 church-wide address stating LDS members would save the US Constitution.

In a 1986 BYU speech and 1987 general conference address, Ezra Taft Benson, then president of the LDS Church, stated, "I have faith that the Constitution will be saved as prophesied by Joseph Smith. But it will not be saved in Washington. ... It will be saved by enlightened members of this Church".

=== Dallin H. Oaks ===
In 2010, Elder Dallin H. Oaks spoke at a Constitution Day celebration and warned about the importance of preserving the US Constitution. To that end, he stated that "all citizens—whatever their religious or philosophical persuasion" should maintain several responsibilities regarding the Constitution: understand it, support the law, practice civic virtue, maintain civility in political discourse, and promote patriotism.

== Interpretation and influence ==
The prophecy remains influential in conservative Mormon political discussion, with multiple top LDS leaders citing similar teachings. Questions on LDS attitudes towards the United States government, whether they are considered on their own or as parts of the White Horse Prophecy, have arisen from time to time as prominent church members have become involved in American politics. The White Horse Prophecy has been characterized as "effectively plac[ing] believers on perpetual Red Alert for the Constitution's possible demise" and as admonishing Mormons to "come to the rescue and restore the true Constitution by any means necessary."

Writers such as Richard Abanes and Elaine Wolff stated, on the basis of the prophecy, that Mormons expect that the US will eventually become a "Mormon-ruled theocracy divinely ordained to 'not only direct the political affairs of the Mormon community, but eventually those of the United States and ultimately the world'" and that "a Mormon, if he were elected president, would take his orders from Salt Lake City." LDS member Ryan C. Bundy cited the prophecy and similar teachings as a motivation for the 2014 Bundy standoff and 2016 Occupation of the Malheur National Wildlife Refuge.

Besides many members of the Republican Party, some Democratic Party church members have also been inspired to run for office by the White Horse Prophecy.

=== Romney family ===
In 1967, US presidential candidate George W. Romney said the following on the White Horse Prophecy: "I have always felt that they meant that sometime the question of whether we are going to proceed on the basis of the Constitution would arise and at this point government leaders who were Mormons would be involved in answering that question." In 2007, US presidential candidate Mitt Romney, George's son, told the Salt Lake Tribune, "I haven't heard my name associated with [the White Horse Prophecy] or anything of that nature. That's not official church doctrine.... I don't put that at the heart of my religious belief."

=== Glenn Beck ===
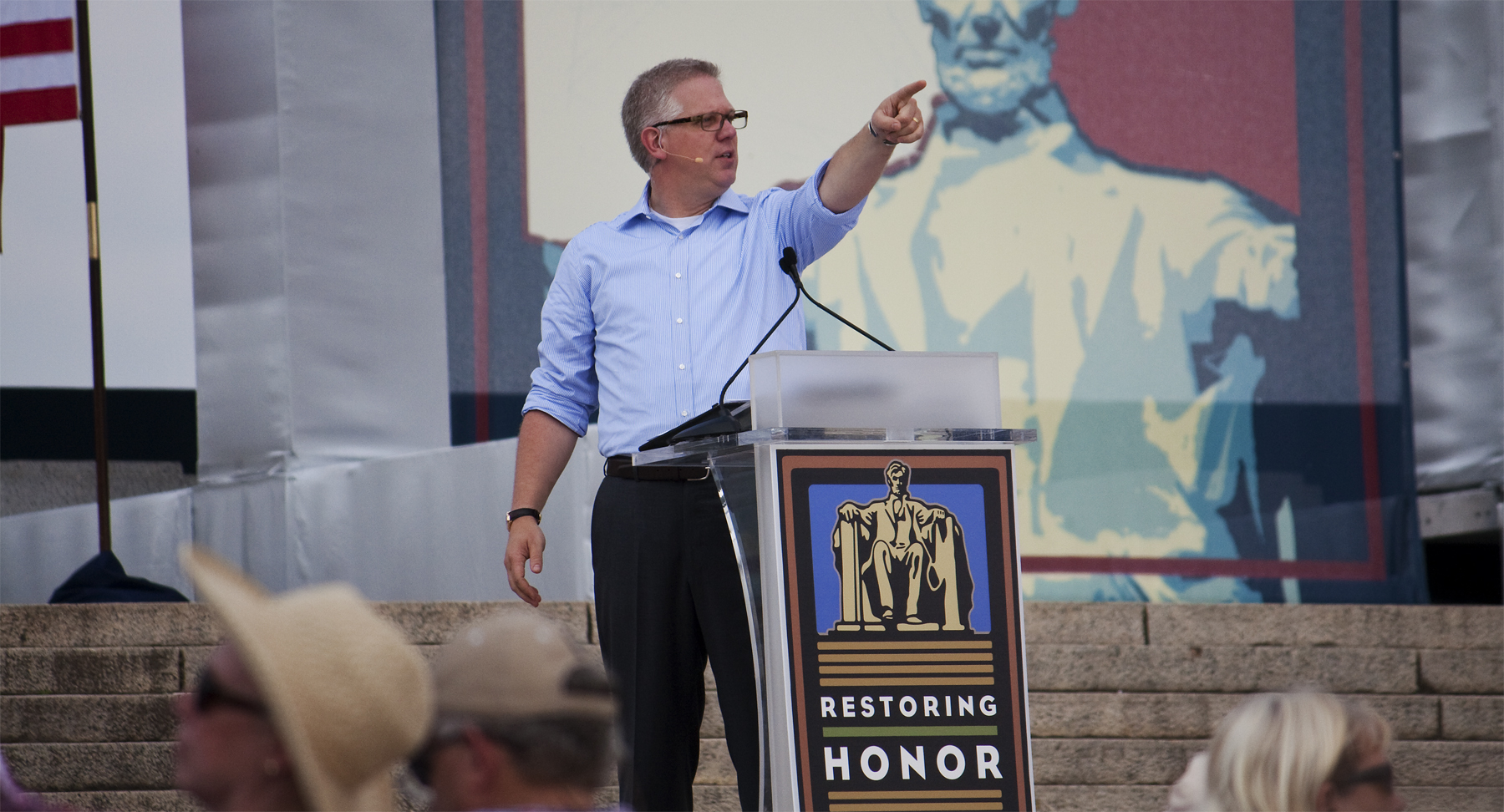
Media figure Glenn Beck, speaking at the Restoring Honor rally in 2010

Conservative media figure Glenn Beck, who joined the LDS Church in 1999, has alleged that President Barack Obama "is going to bring us to the verge of shredding the Constitution, of massive socialism." On November 14, 2008, after Obama's election, Beck appeared on Bill O'Reilly's show The O'Reilly Factor and said that "we are at the place where the Constitution hangs in the balance, I feel the Constitution is hanging in the balance right now, hanging by a thread unless the good Americans wake up." Earlier in November, while interviewing US Senator Orrin Hatch of Utah, also a Mormon, Beck had remarked, "I heard Barack Obama talk about the Constitution and I thought, we are at the point or we are very near the point where our Constitution is hanging by a thread." Hatch appeared on Beck's Fox News show in January 2009, and Beck prompted him by declaring, "I believe our Constitution hangs by a thread."

Blogger and religious commentator Joanna Brooks has said that "it is likely that Beck owes his brand of Founding Father–worship to Mormonism.... Many Mormons also believe that Joseph Smith prophesied in 1843 that the US Constitution would one day 'hang by a thread' and be saved by faithful Mormons." Washington Post journalist Dana Milbank has described Beck's views as essentially "White Horse Prophecy meets horsemen of the apocalypse," but Milbank has also observed that the White Horse Prophecy is "actually a fairly benign prophecy. They're talking about restoring law and order and peace and tranquility. It doesn't sound like a violent thing."

=== Rex Rammell ===
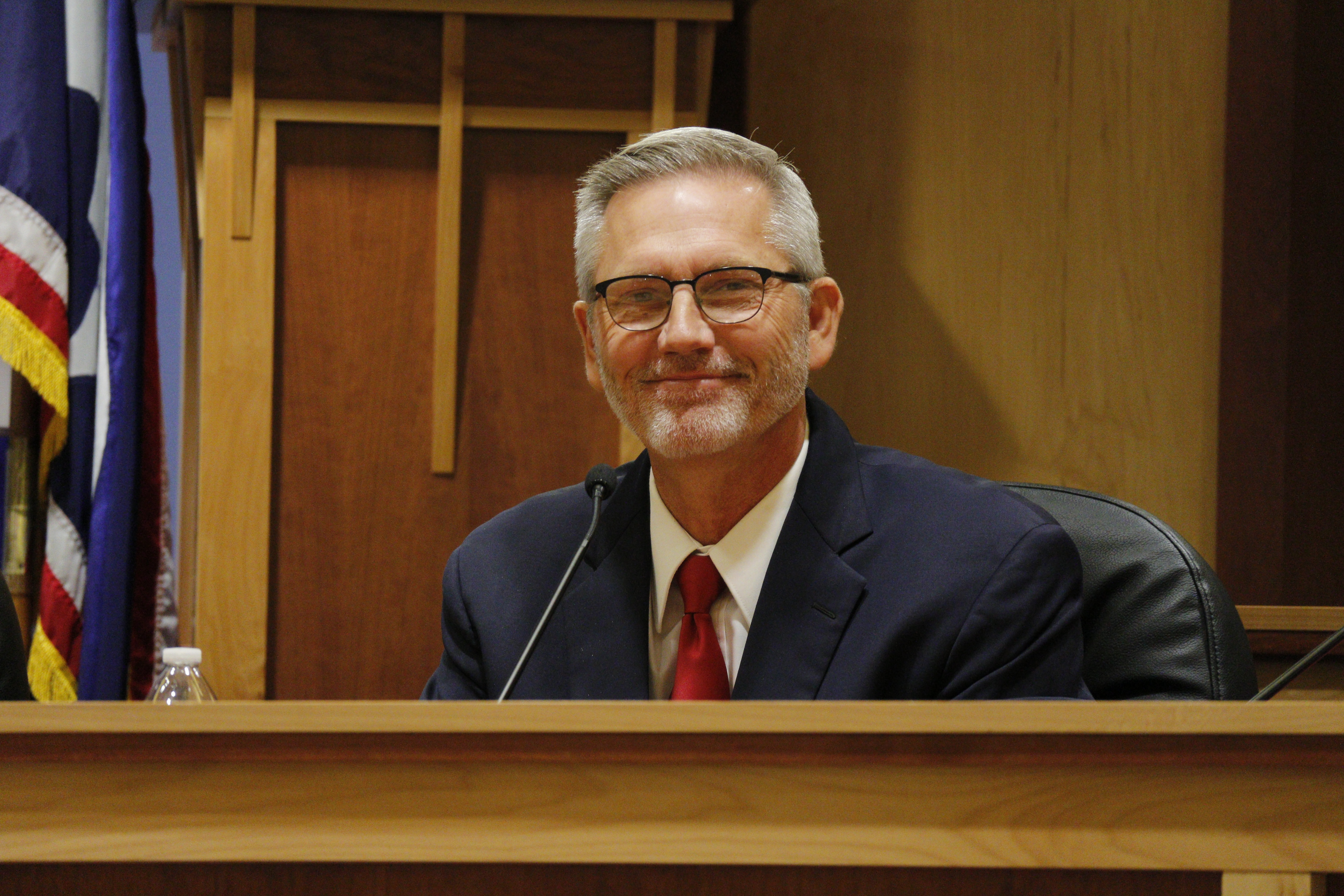
LDS candidate for Idaho state governor Rex Rammell

In 2009, Idaho gubernatorial candidate Rex Rammell announced plans to hold a series of meetings with believing Mormon men, which were to include discussion of the White Horse Prophecy. In response, the LDS Church issued a statement that said that the church is "politically neutral" and hoped that "the campaign practices of political candidates would not suggest that their candidacy is supported by or connected to the church."

Rammell later retracted his original plan to limit his meetings to LDS men and apologized to "all those citizens who are not members of the LDS faith, who have expressed a sincere interest in attending my meetings and discussing this prophecy and how we can step forward and save the United States Constitution."

== See also ==
- List of prophecies of Joseph Smith
- Mormon folklore
- Theodemocracy
- LDS Church and politics in the United States
