= Ezra Thayre =

American missionary (1791–1862)

Personal details
- Born: 14 October 1791; Randolph, Vermont, United States
- Died: 6 September 1862 (aged 70)
- Spouse(s): Relief Wales; Polly Wales
- Children: 6
- Parents: Ezra Thayre; Charlotte French

Ezra Thayre (also spelled Thayer) (October 14, 1791 – September 6, 1862) was an early convert and leader in the Latter Day Saint movement.

== Personal life ==
Ezra Thayre was born in Randolph, Vermont, to Ezra and Charlotte French Thayre. Thayre was a builder of bridges, dams, and mills in the Palmyra, New York area in the 1820s. In 1810 Thayre married Polly Wells and they had one child. After the 1822 death of Wells, Thayre then married Relief Wales and they had five children.

== Conversion to The Church of Jesus Christ of Later Day Saints ==
Thayre was an early convert to the Church of Jesus Christ of Latter-day Saints, being baptized by Parley P. Pratt on October 10, 1830 after he heard Joseph and Hyrum Smith speak about the Book of Mormon.

When Hyrum began to speak, every word touched me to the inmost soul. I thought every word was pointed to me. The tears rolled down my cheeks. When Hyrum got through, he picked up a book and said, “Here is the book of Mormon.” I said, “Let me see it.” I then opened the book, and I received a shock with such exquisite joy that no pen can write and no tongue can express. I shut the book and said, “What is the price of it?” “Fourteen shillings,” was the reply. I said, “I’ll take the book.” I opened it again, and I felt a double portion of the Spirit, that I did not know whether I was in the world or not. I felt as though I was truly in heaven.

Shortly after Thayre's baptism, Smith received a revelation that directed Thayre and Northrop Sweet to "open ye your ears and hearken to the voice of the Lord your God, whose word is quick and powerful, sharper than a two-edged sword, to the dividing asunder of the joints and marrow, soul and spirit; and is a discerner of the thoughts and intents of the heart ".

== Church service ==
On June 6, 1831, Joseph Smith received a revelation instructing Thayre to depart on a mission to Missouri with Thomas B. Marsh. In preparation for this, Thayre was ordained an elder in the church by Lyman Wight. However, due to a disagreement about property that arose among Thayre and some of the Latter Day Saints living in Thompson, Ohio, Thayre was not prepared to leave when Marsh was ready. A revelation to Smith revoked the mission call to Thayre, assigned Marsh a new companion, and instructed Thayre to "repent of his pride, and of his selfishness". Later in 1832, Thayre did serve a mission to New York with Marsh.

In 1834, Thayre joined Zion's Camp, a group of Latter Day Saints that traveled from Ohio to assist some members of the church in Missouri. However, on June 21, 1834, Thayre contracted cholera, which quickly spread to many of the other Saints in Zion's Camp. However, Thayre went on to make a full recovery.

On March 1, 1835, Thayre was ordained a seventy in the church. However, on May 2, 1835, Thayre's priesthood was suspended after an unspecified complaint of misbehavior filed by Oliver Granger. A disciplinary council was held, and Thayre was eventually restored to full fellowship in the church. In 1838, Thayre became a member of the Adam-ondi-Ahman stake high council. In 1839, he moved with the majority of Latter Day Saints to Nauvoo, Illinois.

In 1844, shortly after being made a member of the Council of Fifty, Thayre departed on a mission with Jedediah M. Grant, George A. Smith and Wilford Woodruff to campaign for Joseph Smith as President of the United States.

== Death of Joseph Smith ==
After the death of Joseph Smith in June 1844, Thayre was part of the minority of Latter Day Saints who refused to follow the leadership of Brigham Young and the Quorum of the Twelve. When the majority of Saints departed Nauvoo for the Salt Lake Valley, Thayer remained behind in Nauvoo. In 1849, Thayre moved to Michigan. Affiliated briefly with James J. Strang at Voree, Walworth Co., Wisconsin, but soon returned to New York where he was rebaptized into the LDS Church in September 1854. He became a member of the Reorganized Church of Jesus Christ of Latter Day Saints in at Galien, Berrien Co., Michigan on August 24, 1860.

== Death and confusion ==
The date of Thayre's death has had some conflicting accounts. Some sources report that he died in 1856 in Massachusetts, but these reports conflict with RLDS Church records that report him being baptized in 1860. Genealogical confusion has also resulted because Thayre's father was also named Ezra, but unlike the junior Thayre, he usually spelled his name Thayer. Other sources report Thayre's birthplace as being Randolph, Massachusetts instead of Randolph, Vermont.

The Joseph Smith Papers Project, citing a record of Ontwa Township cemeteries, gives Thayre's death date as September 6, 1862.
