= Simon Langton Grammar School =

There are two Grammar schools named after Simon Langton, both based in Canterbury, Kent:

- Simon Langton Grammar School for Boys
- Simon Langton Girls' Grammar School
