= Oliver Granger =

American Mormon leader (1794–1841)

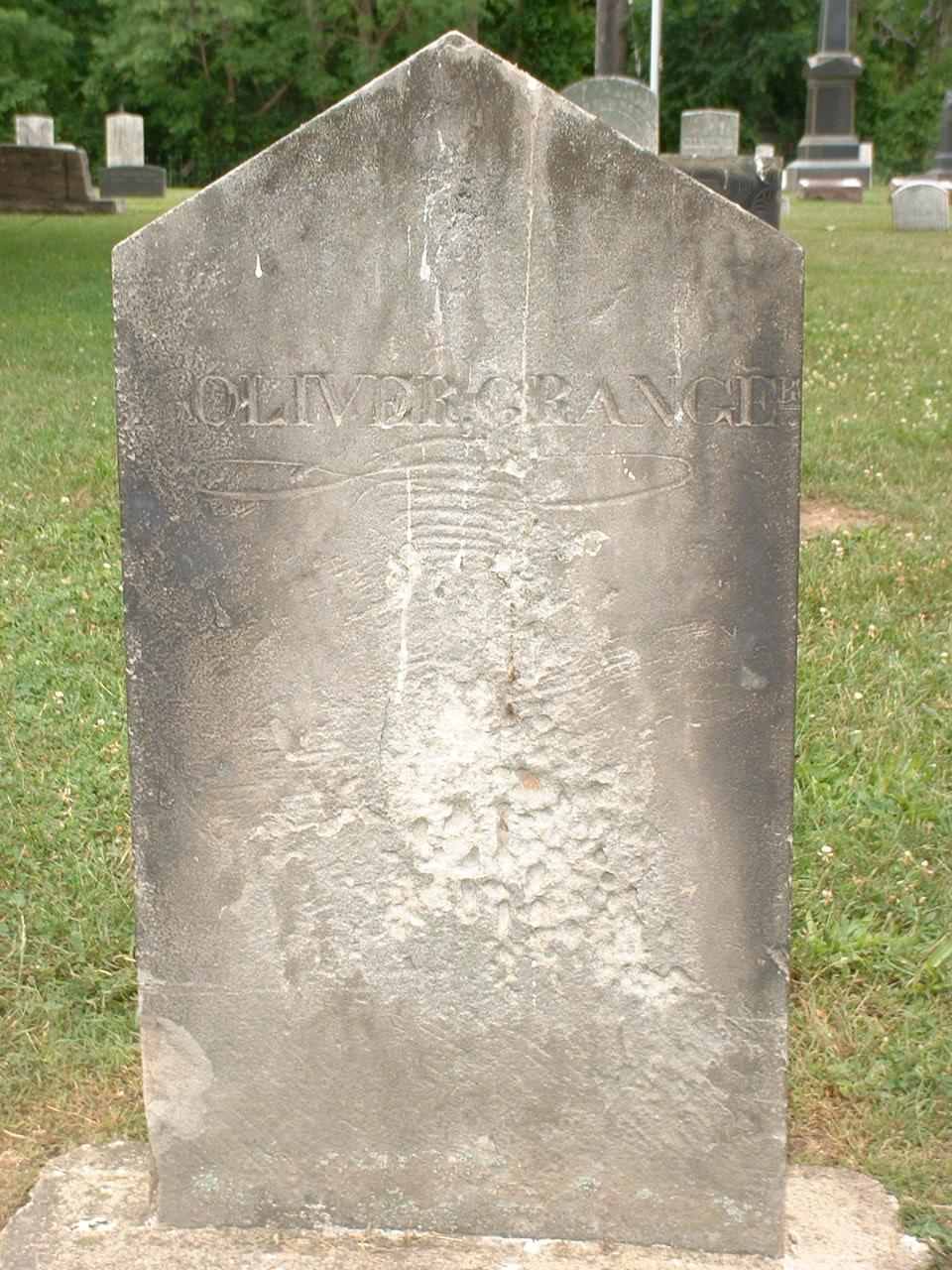
Headstone at Oliver Granger's grave in Kirtland, Ohio

Oliver Granger (February 7, 1794 – August 27, 1841) was an early leader in the Church of Jesus Christ of Latter Day Saints. He was the subject of one of the prophecies of movement founder Joseph Smith.

== Early life ==
Granger was born in Phelps, New York, to Pierce Granger and Clarissa Trumble on February 7, 1794. Before becoming a Latter Day Saint, Granger was a member of the Methodist Church and a licensed preacher. On September 8, 1818, Granger married Lydia Dibble. They had three children together: two sons and a daughter. During the 1820s, Granger was a sheriff in Ontario County, New York. In 1827, Granger lost most of his vision due to cold and exposure.

== Church of Jesus Christ of Latter Day Saints member and missionary ==
Granger and his wife became converted to the Latter Day Saint religion after they both read the Book of Mormon in 1832. According to Granger's daughter, Granger had a vision in which the angel Moroni told him that the Book of Mormon was "a true record of great worth" and that he "should hereafter be ordained to preach the everlasting Gospel to the children of men". Granger was baptized into the Church of Christ (as the Church of Jesus Christ of Latter Day Saints church was known at the time) by Brigham Young and was ordained to be an elder by Young and Joseph Smith in Wayne, New York. Almost immediately, Granger set out on a mission for the young church.

In 1833, Granger joined the gathering of the Church of Jesus Christ of Latter Day Saints in Kirtland, Ohio. He was assigned by Joseph Smith to serve another mission in the eastern United States with Samuel Newcomb. After returning to Kirtland, Granger was ordained to the priesthood office of high priest on April 29, 1836, and became a member of the Kirtland high council on October 8, 1837. In 1836, Granger was again asked by Smith to serve a mission. Granger worked mainly in New York with John P. Greene, establishing large branches of the church in Huntsburg and Perry.

== Special assignment and prophecy ==
In 1838, after most of the Latter Day Saints had left Kirtland and settled in Far West, Missouri, Granger was asked by the First Presidency to return to Kirtland to be the church's agent in settling outstanding church debts and selling property the Latter Day Saints owned in Ohio. This calling was extended to Granger in a revelation given to Smith on July 8, 1838, which is today printed as the 117th section of the LDS Church's edition of the Doctrine and Covenants. The portion of the revelation addressed to Granger reads as follows:

And again, I say unto you, I remember my servant Oliver Granger; behold, verily I say unto him that his name shall be had in sacred remembrance from generation to generation, forever and ever, saith the Lord. Therefore, let him contend earnestly for the redemption of the First Presidency of my Church, saith the Lord; and when he falls he shall rise again, for his sacrifice shall be more sacred unto me than his increase, saith the Lord. Therefore, let him come up hither speedily, unto the land of Zion; and in the due time he shall be made a merchant unto my name, saith the Lord, for the benefit of my people. Therefore let no man despise my servant Oliver Granger, but let the blessings of my people be on him forever and ever.

Granger performed this assignment with such satisfaction to the creditors involved that one of them wrote: “Oliver Granger’s management in the arrangement of the unfinished business of people that have moved to the Far West, in redeeming their pledges and thereby sustaining their integrity, has been truly praiseworthy, and has entitled him to my highest esteem, and every grateful recollection.” However, Granger was largely unsuccessful in selling the church's property, and most of it would eventually fall into the hands of others who would never pay the church any remuneration. Granger then acquired property in Lee County, Iowa for the church in 1839.

Granger remained in Kirtland until his death in 1841 at the age of 47. Even though there were few Latter Day Saints in the area at the time, his funeral was attended "by a vast concourse of people" from Kirtland and neighboring towns. He was interred in the Kirtland North Cemetery, next to the Kirtland Temple.

=== Prophecy controversy ===
Some critics of Joseph Smith and the Latter Day Saint movement have pointed to Smith's revelation to Granger as an example of a "false prophecy"; the critics allege that even though Smith's revelation stated that Granger's name would be held "in sacred remembrance from generation to generation, forever and ever", most members of The Church of Jesus Christ of Latter-day Saints are unfamiliar with Granger's name or his activities. However, the wording says nothing concerning fame or widespread recognition. A Latter-day Saint apologist has responded to these charges by stating that "the words 'sacred remembrance' most likely refer to the fact that the Lord would remember him. After all, the verse begins with the Lord saying, 'I remember my servant Oliver Granger.'" Another apologist has written:

Detractors ... imply that the Doctrine and Covenants says everyone will remember him. That is not what the revelation says. As long as we have the Doctrine and Covenants, Oliver Granger's name will be there, and therefore this declaration is fulfilled. The Bible student will find an interesting parallel in Matt. 26:13. Here the Savior states that wherever the gospel is preached, the act of the woman anointing him will be as a memorial to her. Last time the gospel was preached, did anyone tell the story about this woman? Not likely. But this doesn't detract from the truthfulness of the statement in the Bible any more than it would have regarding the Doctrine and Covenants, if that had been what D & C 117 had said. Her act was preserved in the Bible, and therefore this prophecy is fulfilled.

== Legacy ==
Granger is occasionally cited by leaders of the Church of Jesus Christ of Latter-day Saints as an example of an ordinary person who accomplished great works as a result of simple dedication and faith.

Granger is the great-great-grandfather of actor Farley Granger.

== See also ==
- Sarah Granger Kimball
