= Thomas Thayre =

English Medical writer

- Occupation: Medical writer

Thomas Thayre (fl. 1603–1625) was an English medical writer.

== Biography ==
Thayre describes himself as a ‘chirurgian’ in July 1603; but as his name does not occur among the members of the Barber-Surgeons' Company, and as he uses no such description in 1625, he was probably one of the numerous irregular practitioners of the period, and no sworn surgeon. He published in London in 1603 a ‘Treatise of the Pestilence,’ dedicated to Sir Robert Lee, lord mayor 1602–3. The cause of the disease, the regimen, drugs and diet proper for its treatment are discussed. Ten diagnostic symptoms are described, and some theology is intermixed. The general plan differs little from that of Thomas Phaer's ‘Treatise on the Plague,’ and identical sentences occur in several places [see Phaer, Thomas]. These passages have suggested the untenable view (Catalogue of the Library of the Royal Medical and Chirurgical Society of London, ii. 439) that the works are identical, and Thayre a misprint for Phayre. A similar resemblance of passages is to be detected in English books of the sixteenth century on other medical subjects, and is usually to be traced to several writers independently adopting and slightly altering some admired passage in a common source. Thayre published a second edition in 1625, dedicated to John Gore, lord mayor 1624–5. The work shows little medical knowledge, but preserves some interesting particulars of domestic life, and, though inferior in style to the writings of Christopher Langton and even of William Clowes, contains a few well-put and idiomatic expressions.
