= Zachary Langton =

Zachary Langton (1698–1788) was an English divine.

== Life ==
He was the third son of Cornelius Langton of Kirkham, Lancashire, and Elizabeth his wife, daughter of the Rev. Zachary Taylor, headmaster of the grammar school there. He was baptised at Kirkham on 24 September 1698. He was educated at Kirkham Grammar School, and, on being elected to a Barker exhibition, went to Magdalen Hall, Oxford, where he graduated B.A. on 18 December 1721, and M.A. on 10 June 1724. After his ordination he removed to Ireland, where his kinsman, Dr. Robert Clayton, was bishop of Killala, and afterwards of Clogher. He held preferments in the diocese of Killala, and was chaplain between 1746 and 1761 to the Earls of Harrington. He held the prebend of Killaraght from 5 July 1735 until 1782, and that of Errew from 6 December 1735 until his death.

In November 1761 Langton returned to England, and was present at Kirkham Church in 1769 at the recantation of William Gant, late a Roman Catholic priest. He died at Oxford on 1 February 1786. He had married Bridget, daughter of Alexander Butler of Kirkland, Lancashire, but died without issue.

== Works ==
Langton published anonymously An Essay concerning the Human Rational Soul, in Three Parts, Dublin, 1753; Liverpool, 1755; Oxford, 1764. The Oxford edition has a dedication of 166 pages addressed to the Duke of Bedford, Lord-Lieutenant of Ireland.
