= Christopher Langton (physician) =

English physician

- Born: 1521; Riccall
- Died: 1578 (aged 56–57)
- Occupation: Physician

Christopher Langton (1521 – 1578) was an English physician.

== Early life ==
Langton was born in 1521 at Riccall in Yorkshire, was educated on the foundation at Eton, and went as a scholar 23 August 1538 to King's College, Cambridge. He was admitted a fellow of King's College a week later than all the other scholars of his year, 2 September 1541, and graduated B.A. 1542. He received his last quarterage as a fellow at Cambridge at Christmas 1544, and in 1547 he describes himself as 'a lerner and as yet a yong student of physicke' (Dedication of Brefe Treatise), and in 1549 he was studying 'Galen de Usu partium.' His copy of the Paris edition of 1528, with his name, the date, and notes in his handwriting on several pages, is in the Cambridge University Library.

== Works ==
He published, 10 April 1547, in London, 'A very Brefe Treatise, orderly declaring the Principal Partes of Plysick, that is to say, thynges natural, thynges not naturall, thynges agaynst nature,' with a dedication to Edward, duke of Somerset. He describes the ancient sects in physic, and then treats of anatomy, pathology, and therapeutics according to the method of his age. He commends Pliny, quotes Hippocrates, Ætius, Paulus Ægineta, Celsus and Galen, but of mediaeval writers only Avicenna. His English style is simple, and resembles that of More, being as full of idiomatic expressions, but much easier and more refined than that of the English treatises of the surgeons of his time. He shows a fair knowledge of Greek, and wrote a good Greek hand, as his copy of Galen proves. In 1550 published, through the same printer, 'Edward Whitchurch, of Flete Street, An Introduction into Phisycke, wyth a Universal Dyct.' It is dedicated to Sir Arthur Darcye, of whose favours he speaks, and begins with an address supposed to be spoken by Physic in person. Parts of it are mere alterations of his former treatise, and the additional matter is not important.

== Later career ==
He was admitted a fellow of the College of Physicians of London on 30 Sept. 1552, having taken his M.D. degree at Cambridge, but was expelled for breach of the statutes and profligate conduct 17 July 1558, Dr. Caius being then president. On 16 June 1563, having been detected in an intrigue with two girls, he was punished by being carted to the Guildhall and through the city. Machyn (Diary, Camden Soc.), who saw him, describes his appearance in the cart. His professional ability must have been considerable, for in spite of this public disgrace he continued to have practice. Lord Monteagle gave him a pension, both Sir Thomas Smith and Sir Richard Gresham were his patients, and the latter left him a small legacy (will printed in Burgon, Life and Times of Sir T. Gresham, ii. 493). He published one other book, a 'Treatise of Urines, of all the Colours thereof, with the Medicines,' London, 1552. He died in 1578, and was buried in London at St. Botolph's Church, Bishopsgate.
