= Austin Cowles =

Mormon leader (1792–1872)

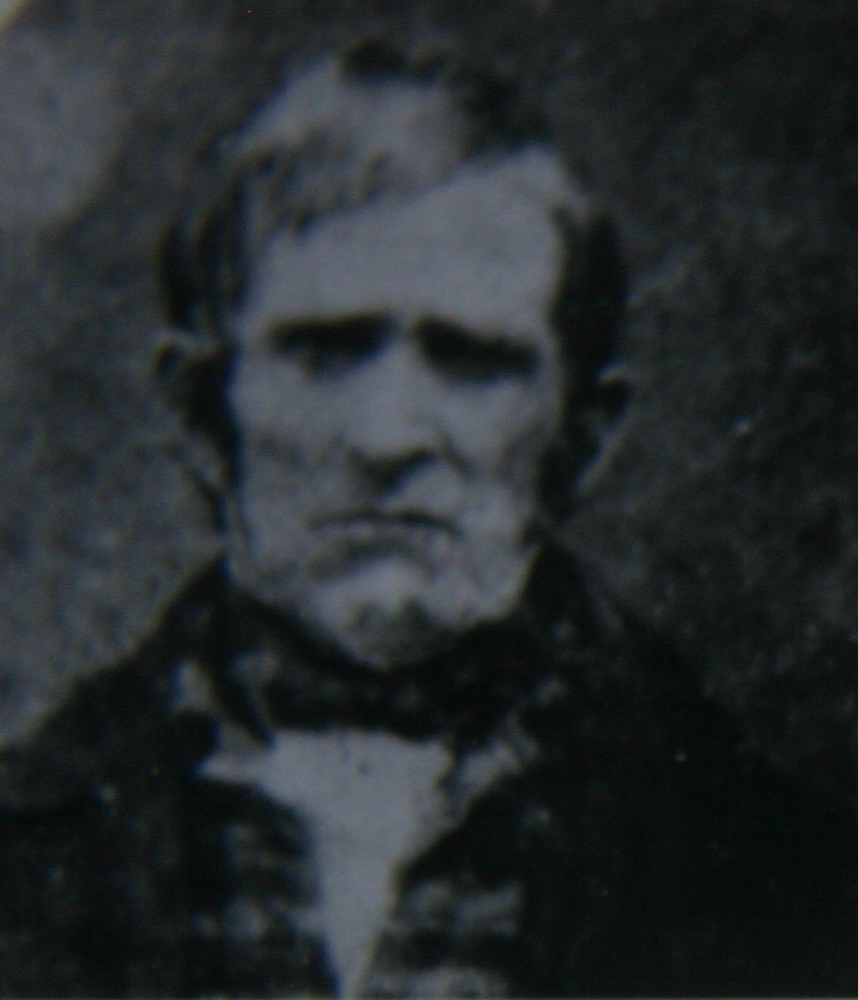
- ca. 1860

Counselor in the First Presidency of the True Church of Jesus Christ of Latter Day Saints
- April 1844 – June 1844
- Called by: William Law
- End reason: Church dissolved

Personal details
- Born: May 3, 1792; Brookfield, Vermont, U.S.
- Died: January 15, 1872 (aged 79); Hamilton Township, Iowa, U.S.
- Spouse(s): Phebe Wilbur (m. 1813–1826) Irena H. Elliott (m. 1827–1872)
- Children: 14
- Parents: Timothy Cowles; Abigail Woodworth

Austin Cowles (May 3, 1792 – January 15, 1872) was a leader and hymnwriter of the early Latter Day Saint movement. Over the course of his life, Cowles, an ardent anti-polygamist, was affiliated with Joseph Smith's Church of Christ (later the Church of Jesus Christ of Latter Day Saints), William Law's True Church of Jesus Christ of Latter Day Saints, Sidney Rigdon's Church of Christ, James Strang's Church of Jesus Christ of Latter Day Saints, James C. Brewster's Church of Christ, and Joseph Smith III's Reorganized Church of Jesus Christ of Latter Day Saints.

== Early life ==
Cowles was born on May 3, 1792, in Brookfield, Vermont, to Timothy and Abigail (Woodworth) Cowles. As a child, he lost an eye when one of his brothers accidentally shot him with an arrow.

Despite minimal education, Cowles became a schoolteacher as a young man and a Methodist Episcopal preacher at age twenty-one. In the latter capacity, he held the first formal religious services in Bolivar, New York, in a barn in 1820. In pioneering the Bolivar area, Cowles and his brother Asa taught at the first schoolhouse, kept the first store, and built the first sawmill and gristmill.

Cowles married Phebe Wilbur on January 14, 1813, and by her had eight children, five of whom survived to adulthood. Phebe died on May 1, 1826, whereafter Cowles remarried to Irena Hix Elliott on October 21, 1827. Cowles and Irena had six children.

Around 1828, Cowles contracted a disease affecting the bones of his feet, which he suffered from throughout his life.

== Latter Day Saint movement ==
Cowles became a "fervent believer" in the teachings of the restored gospel of Jesus Christ shortly after Joseph Smith's Church of Christ was established in 1830. He was baptized a member of the church in 1832 in New York and was made an Elder on September 28, 1836, in Kirtland, Ohio.

By 1840, Cowles was living in Hancock County, Illinois, near the Mormon headquarters of Nauvoo. In February 1841, he was elected "supervisor of streets" in Nauvoo.

Cowles became a member of the Nauvoo high council on February 6, 1841. A month later, on March 30, he was appointed counselor to Nauvoo stake president William Marks.

On June 1, 1843, Cowles's daughter Elvira married Joseph Smith as a plural wife. Six month earlier, on December 1, 1842, Elvira had married Johnathan Holmes.

On September 12, 1843, Cowles resigned his seat in the high council. Afterwards, Cowles "was far more outspoken and energetic in his opposition to polygamy than almost any other man in Nauvoo." Afterwards, he "was looked upon as a seceder."

On April 18, 1844, First Presidency member William Law and his wife Jane were excommunicated from the church, along with his brother Wilson Law, a Major General in the Nauvoo Legion. Also cut off were Robert D. Foster and Howard Smith.

On May 18, Cowles was excommunicated for apostasy, along with James Blakesley, Francis M. Higbee of the Nauvoo Legion, and Charles Ivins. On May 29, the high council published document purporting to show Higbee's brother Chauncey L. Higbee had also committed misdeeds.

In 1844, Cowles swore an affidavit accusing the church of teaching the doctrine of plural marriage. This statement was published along with others, in the first and only issue of the Nauvoo Expositor. After the publication, Joseph Smith ordered the press destroyed, ultimately resulting in his arrest and death.

After Smith's death, Cowles accepted the succession claims of James Strang. In 1847, Cowles was appointed by Strang to be the presiding high priest in Kirtland, Ohio.

Cowles died in Hamilton Township, Decatur County, Iowa, on January 15, 1872, aged seventy-nine. He was affiliated with the Reorganized Church of Jesus Christ of Latter Day Saints led by Joseph Smith III, and his obituary was published in the church's periodical, the Saints' Herald.

== Hymns ==
- "But Hark and Hear the Joyful Sound" (1841)
- "O God, Thou Great, Thou Good, Thou Wise" (1841)
