= Criminal charges against Joseph Smith =

Criminal charges, 1826 to 1844

Joseph Smith, the founder of the Latter Day Saint movement, was the subject of approximately twenty-one documented criminal cases between 1826 and 1844 across New York, Ohio, Missouri, and Illinois.

In New York, Smith was repeatedly charged with being a "disorderly person", a misdemeanor related to his activities as "seer". These cases resulted in one disputed outcome followed by two acquittals.

Charges in Ohio included assault, battery, and conspiracy to murder. Smith was acquitted of the assault charge, while the conspiracy charge was dismissed in a preliminary hearing.

Following the 1838 Mormon War in Missouri, Smith was indicted for treason, a capital offense. He was incarcerated in Liberty Jail for several months before escaping custody during a transfer to a different county. Smith successfully used the writ of habeas corpus to quash multiple extradition attempts to Missouri from Illinois.

In 1844, he was charged with adultery for his practice of polygamy. After Smith ordered the destruction of a critical newspaper, he was charged with inciting a riot. Rather than submit to arrest, Smith declared martial law and mobilized the Nauvoo Legion. In response, the Governor mobilized the state militia. Smith surrendered to authorities, expecting to be released on bail. Instead, Smith was charged with treason against Illinois for calling out the Legion. Because treason was a capital crime, Smith was held without bail in Carthage Jail, where he was killed by a mob on June 27, 1844, leaving several indictments legally unresolved.

== Chronology of charges ==
Joseph Smith encountered the criminal justice system in New York, Ohio, Missouri, and Illinois.

=== In New York (1817–30) ===

Smith was born in Vermont in 1805, and his family moved to New York in 1817. At age 20, Smith—described in court records as "Joseph the glasslooker"—faced his first criminal charge, a misdemeanor count of being a "disorderly person". In 1830, he faced the same charge. Smith left New York for Ohio.

==== Brawling with William Stafford ====
While in New York, Smith may have faced charges stemming from a violent encounter with neighbors. Neighbor William Stafford recalled: "a dispute arose between us, (he having drinked a little too freely) and some hard words passed between us, and as usual with him at such times, was for fighting. He got the advantage of me in the scuffle, and a gentleman by the name of Ford interfered, when Joseph turned to fighting him. We both entered a complaint against him and he was fined for the breach of the Peace". In 1843, Smith corroborated the claim, recalling a time when Stafford and "six other fellows pitched upon him [Joseph] unawares. Joseph whipped the whole of them and escaped unhurt which they swore to as recorded in Hurlburt's or Howe's Book." Quinn notes: "Not surprisingly, the official History of the Church, published in Salt Lake City, deleted this passage from the prophet's personal journal, which endorsed the accuracy of affidavits by his Palmyra neighbors".

==== 1826 Trial of Joseph Smith ====
The State of New York v. JS-A was a case in Bainbridge, Chenango County, New York brought against Joseph Smith for being a disorderly person, on account of charging money for glass looking. On March 20, 1826, Smith, age 20, was arrested by Constable Philip De Zeng and taken to court in Bainbridge, New York, on the complaint of Josiah Stowell's nephew, who accused Smith of being "a disorderly person and an imposter." An anonymous writer claimed to have been given access to an account of court proceedings, which was published in Fraser's Magazine during 1873:

[Smith said] he had a certain stone which he had occasionally looked at to determine where hidden treasures in the bowels of the earth were; that he professed to tell in this manner where gold mines were a distance under ground, and had looked for Mr. Stowel several times, and had informed him where he could find these treasures, and Mr. Stowel had been engaged in digging for them. That at Palmyra he pretended to tell by looking at this stone where coined money was buried in Pennsylvania, and while at Palmyra had frequently ascertained in that way where lost property was of various kinds; that he had occasionally been in the habit of looking through this stone to find lost property for three years, but of late had pretty much given it up on account of its injuring his health, especially his eyes, making them sore; that he did not solicit business of this kind, and had always rather declined having anything to do with this business.

In 1838, Joseph Smith stated that he had, in fact, worked for Josiah Stowell but Smith avoided mentioning the court hearing and downplayed his role by claiming to be a mere bystander. Smith said that Stowell had heard of a lost Spanish silver mine near Harmony, Pennsylvania, and wanted to find it. According to Smith, Stowell: "took me, with the rest of his hands, to dig for the silver mine, at which I continued to work for nearly a month, without success in our undertaking, and finally I prevailed with the old gentleman to cease digging after it. Hence arose the very prevalent story of my having been a money-digger."

Examined by the Justice, Joseph Smith Jr., Joseph Stowell, and Joseph Smith Sr. all acknowledged Joseph Jr. had a stone he looked at in order to find lost treasure. While the testimony actually implicated Smith as a "glass-looker", Vogel argues multiple points would have suggested leniency in the case. Smith was a minor, only 20 years of age, with his father present as a character witness. Smith had not solicited business as a seer but had instead been recruited to the job by the elder Stowell. Smith did not stand accused of fraud, Josiah Stowell spoke in Smith's defense, and Smith expressed a willingness to discontinue looking into the stone. While the outcome of the case is uncertain, Joseph Smith was freed and allowed to return home. While rumors decades later suggested he might have escaped custody, Vogel dismisses them; Joseph would revisit Bainbridge in the coming years—something he could not do were he a fugitive.

==== Disorderly person, June 1830 ====
After publishing the Book of Mormon, Smith was charged with violating the state's disorderly person statute, which included "pretending to tell fortunes, or where lost or stolen items may be found." Constable Ebenezer Hatch arrested Smith on the night of June 30, 1830, and brought him the next day before Justice Joseph P. Chamberlin on a charge of being a disorderly person. Smith was transported to South Bainbridge, Chenango County, New York. His two-day trial took place in late June, ending on July 1, 1830, and he was defended by two attorneys hired by Joseph Knight.

Smith pled the statute of limitations, since it had been over three years since his 1826 arrest. After the prosecution argued Smith had continued looking into the stone, Cowdery testified that Smith had not used the stone but had instead used "two transparent stones, resembling glass, set in silver bows". Vogel argues this testimony demonstrates "Cowdery’s willingness to alter history", as eyewitnesses uniformly report Smith had actually used the seer stone in a hat during the dictation process.

Smith was acquitted. Immediately after his release, however, he was arrested again and transported back to Colesville, Broome County, New York, for a second trial; he was acquitted again.

=== In Ohio (1831–38) ===
Kirtland, in Lake County, Ohio

In Ohio, Smith faced numerous charges, including charges of assault, illegal banking, and banking fraud. In 1838, he fled Ohio for Missouri.

==== Assault on Calvin Stoddard, April 1835 ====
State of Ohio v. JS for Assault and Battery was a trial against Joseph Smith for the alleged assault and battery of Calvin Stoddard in Kirtland, Ohio. On April 21, 1835, Smith was charged with assaulting his brother-in-law Calvin, husband of Smith's sister Sophronia. Earlier that day, the two men had entered a physical altercation over water on a plot of land. Witnesses testified that Joseph Smith knocked Stoddard to the ground and hit him (witnesses vary on the number of times). Some witnesses testified that Stoddard used a cane to threaten Smith, which Stoddard denied.

On June 16, 1835, a grand jury in the Geauga County Court of Common Pleas indicted Joseph Smith for using "force and arms" against Stoddard. Smith pleaded "guilty, unless the Court on hearing the evidence adduced shall be of opinion that he is not guilty." All parties agreed to move forward to trial without a jury.

On June 20, 1835, Judge Matthew Birchard determined Joseph Smith was not guilty. According to the Telegraph report, Stoddard testified that: "Smith then came up and struck him on the forehead with his flat hand— the blow knocked him down, when Smith repeated the blow four or five times, very hard— made him blind— that Smith afterwards came to him and asked his forgiveness— was satisfied— had forgiven him— would forgive any man who would injure him and ask his forgiveness." The Telegraph report explains that Birchard made this decision because "the injured party was satisfied" and because "the assault might perhaps be justified on principles of self-defence".

==== Assault on visiting minister, Autumn 1836 ====
In the fall of 1836, a minister who had known Joseph Smith Jr. back in New York was Smith's guest at his home in Kirtland. During the visit, Smith reportedly assaulted the minister. According to constable Luke Johnson, the minister visited the local magistrate and swore out a writ against Joseph for assault and battery. After Constable Johnson swore out a writ of his own, the minister reportedly fled the county.

On January 1, 1843, Joseph Smith recalled the anecdote of him beating the minister: "I whipped him till he begged. He threatened to prosecute me. I sent Luke Johnson the constable after him and he run him out of the County".

==== Conspiracy to murder Grandison Newell, June 1837 ====
State of Ohio v. JS for Threatening to Take Life was an 1837 trial brought against Joseph Smith over his alleged threats to kill local opponent Grandison Newell. According to Newell, Smith had conspired with Solomon Denton and Marvel C. Davis to murder him for Newell's impugning the integrity of the founders of the Kirtland Safety Society. After Newell filed this complaint on April 13 1837, Smith fled the state and stayed with Martin Harris in Palmyra, New York.

On June 3, Smith appeared before Justice Flint in a preliminary hearing. Orson Hyde testified: "Smith seemed much excited and declared that Newell should be put out of the way, or where the crows could not find him: he said destroying Newell would be justifiable in the sight of God, that it was the will of God". Denton testified that he, along with Davis, were tasked with murdering Newell. According to Denton, Smith spoke of "Newell; said he had injured the society, and that it was better for one man to suffer than to have the whole community disturbed; that it was the will of Heaven that Newell should be put out of the way, and that he would take the responsibility, for the deed was justifiable in the sight of God, and would be rewarded: but when we had killed him, he wanted his body secreted if possible." Smith was released on a $500 bond (equivalent to $14,228 in 2025.)

On June 9, Smith appeared at a hearing before the County Court, and the charges against him were dismissed.

=== In Missouri (1838–39) ===
Far West, in Caldwell County, Missouri

On January 12 or 13, 1838, Smith and Rigdon fled in the night, escaping Ohio for Missouri. Bushman explains: "The lawsuits were building up, and apostates were feared to be plotting more desperate measures." Longtime Mormon opponent Grandison Newell later claimed responsibility for the departure, explaining that he had spread rumors of a warrant for Smith's arrest.

In Missouri, Smith faced charges of threatening a public official and later, treason. He escaped custody, likely with the help of his captors, and fled to Illinois.

==== Threats to Judge Adam Black, August 1838 ====
State of Missouri v. JS and Wight for Riot was a case brought against Joseph Smith and Lyman Wight, charging them with participating in a riot outside the home of a Justice of the Peace where they threatened Black's life and forced him to sign a statement promising not to harass the Mormons. On August 8, Smith led an armed group of over a hundred and surrounded the home of Justice of the Peace Adam Black, who had been elected Judge two days earlier. William P. Peniston gave a sworn statement about the events, and on August 10, 1838, Judge King issued a warrant for the arrest of Smith and Lyman Wight. On August 28, Judge Black gave his own sworn statement of the events.

Sheriff Morgan attempted to arrest Wight, but arrived at Wight's home only to find Wight was protected by an armed force of about 100 men. Missouri newspapers reported that Wight had said "that he would not be taken alive—that the law had never protected him, and he owed them no obedience—that the whole state of Missouri could not take him".

Around August 16, Sheriff William Morgan (of Daviess County), accompanied by Judge Morin, traveled to Far West in Caldwell County, to serve the warrant on Smith. Smith refused to return to Daviess County.

On September 7, Judge King conducted a hearing and found sufficient evidence to send the case to a grand jury. Smith was released on a $500 bond (equivalent to $15,117 in 2025).

==== Treason against Missouri, November 1838–39 ====
After the surrender of Mormon forces on November 2, 1838, Smith was surrendered to authorities, arrested and imprisoned in the jail at Liberty, Missouri. On November 12, 1838, Judge King found "probable cause to believe that Joseph Smith, Jr, Lyman Wight, Hiram Smith, Alexander McRay & Caleb Baldwin are guilty of Overt acts of Treason in Daviess County". Smith and other Mormons continued to be held at Liberty Jail.

After a hearing conducted April 9–11, 1839, Smith was indicted by grand jury on the charges larceny, receipt of stolen goods, and treason.

On April 16, 1839, Smith and his companions escaped custody while they were being escorted to Boone County. Smith fled across the border to Illinois. Missouri would spend several years attempting to apprehend and extradite Smith.

=== In Illinois (1839–44) ===
Nauvoo, in Hancock County, IL

After fleeing Missouri, Smith faced attempts to extradite him to Missouri on charges of treason and conspiracy to commit murder. Illinois officials charged Smith with incitement of a riot and later, treason against Illinois.

Smith was killed by a mob while he was jailed awaiting trial.

==== Arrest for fleeing Missouri, 1841 ====
On June 5, 1841, Smith was arrested as a fugitive from Missouri justice. On June 10, he was freed by Judge Stephen A. Douglas.

==== Conspiracy to murder Governor Boggs, 1842–43 ====
On August 8, 1842, Smith and Porter Rockwell were arrested by Illinois law enforcement for their alleged roles in the attempted assassination of former Missouri Governor Lilburn Boggs. The Municipal Court of Nauvoo released Smith and Rockwell, after which they went into hiding. Smith ultimately surrendered to authorities on December 30, and on January 2, 1843, the extradition warrant was quashed by a federal judge in Springfield.

On June 6, 1843, Smith was indicted by a grand jury in the circuit court of Daviess County, Missouri, on the charge of treason against the state. On June 13, 1843, Governor Reynolds dispatched Sheriff Joseph H. Reynolds to apprehend Smith. In Illinois, Reynolds was joined by Constable Harmon T. Wilson of Hancock County, Illinois. On June 21, the two placed Smith under arrest near Dixon, Illinois.

Once they had Smith in their custody, Reynolds and Wilson were themselves placed under arrest by Sheriff Campbell of Lee County, Illinois. Campbell transported Smith, Reynolds, and Wilson to the Municipal Court of Nauvoo. On July 1, the Municipal Court of Nauvoo quashed the warrant and freed Smith.

==== Assault and battery on Walter Bagby, August 1843 ====
Amid a financial dispute, Smith was charged with assault and battery against Hancock County assessor Walter Bagby, grabbing him by the throat and striking him repeatedly. Smith and Mormon-ally J.B. Backenstos visited Hancock county Justice of the Peace Newell K. Whitney, himself an alderman in Nauvoo. Whitney imposed a fine, which was paid.

==== Assault and battery on Bennett, September 1843 ====
Smith was charged with assault and battery against a Warsaw resident by the name of Bennett [not John C. Bennett], beating him with a cane. A complaint was made to Justice Rockwell, who issued a writ for Smith. Arriving in Nauvoo, Constable James Charles, however, was informed that Smith had been tried and acquitted by the Nauvoo municipal court.

==== Adultery and fornication; perjury, May 1844 ====
On May 23, 1844, a Hancock County grand jury indicted Smith for adultery and fornication with Maria Lawrence and other unknown women. A separate indictment was issued for perjury. The charge of perjury was based on testimony by Joseph H. Jackson and Robert D. Foster, while William Law's testimony led to charges of fornication and adultery. Smith appeared before the Circuit Court and his trial was postponed until the next term of the court.

==== "Inciting a riot" destroying the Nauvoo Expositor, June 1844 ====
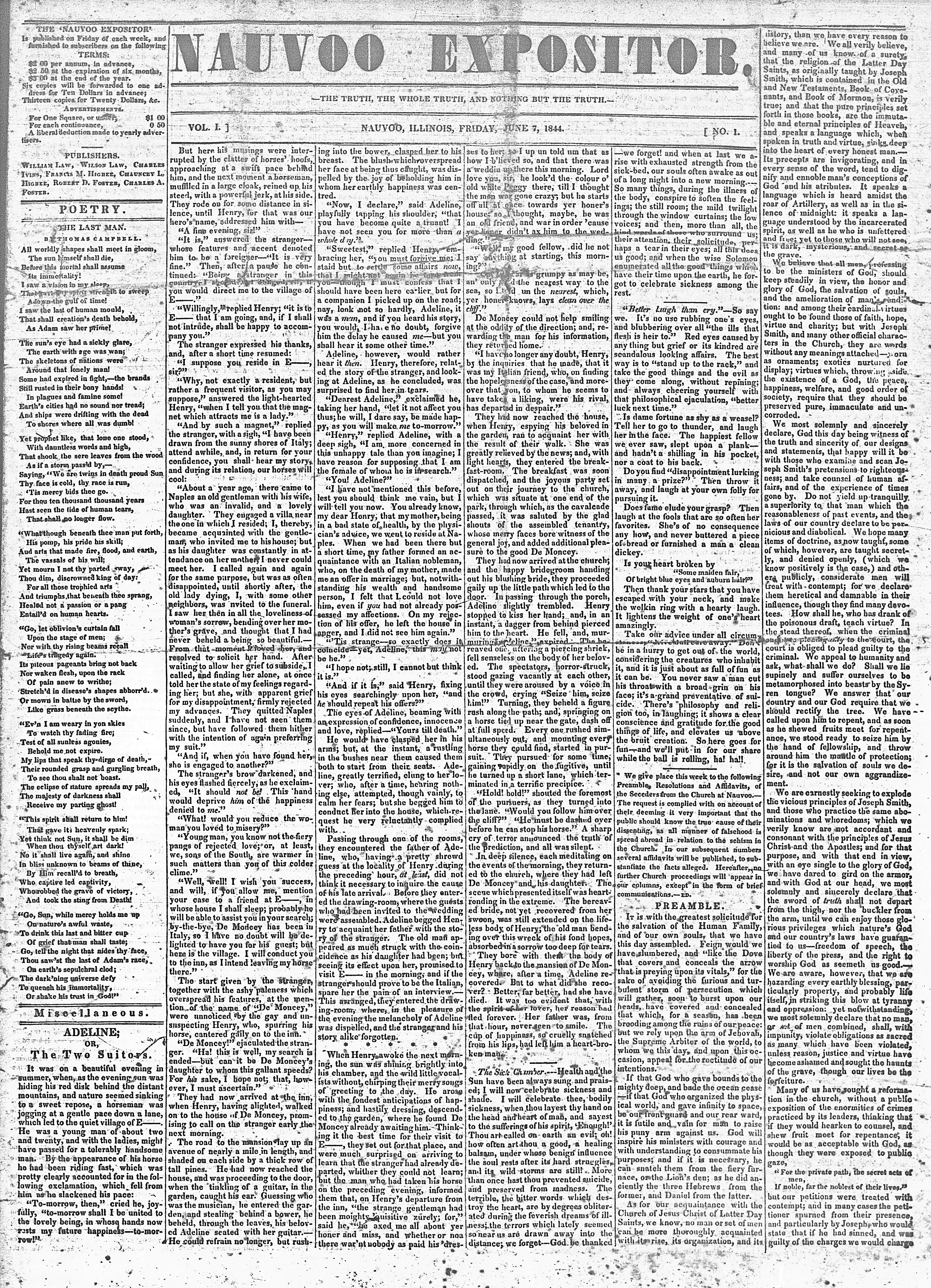
Page from the only issue of the Nauvoo Expositor

The Nauvoo Expositor was a newspaper that published only one issue, which was dated June 7, 1844. The Expositor was founded by several seceders from Smith's church and was critical of Smith and other church leaders. Those who published the Expositor espoused a belief in Mormonism, but criticized Smith for doctrines such as plural marriage and exaltation.

As mayor, Smith and the Nauvoo City Council declared the newspaper a public nuisance and ordered the press destroyed. The town marshal carried out the order that evening.

On June 11, the Hancock County Justice of the Peace issued a warrant for the arrest of Smith and 17 other individuals on charges of inciting a riot. Constable David Bettisworth was tasked with arresting Smith and conveying him to the Hancock County Court. Rather than return to court with Constable Bettisworth, Smith instead petitioned the Municipal Court of Nauvoo to dismiss the charges.

==== Treason against Illinois, June 1844 ====
Smith declared martial law in Nauvoo on June 18 and called out the Nauvoo Legion, an organized city militia of about 5,000 men. In response, Governor Ford organized a state militia to arrest Smith.

Smith fled Illinois to avoid arrest, crossing the Mississippi River into Iowa. On June 23, a posse under the command of the governor entered Nauvoo to execute the arrest warrant, but they were unable to locate Smith.

On June 25, Smith and his co-defendants surrendered to Constable Bettisworth on the original charge of inciting a riot. An arraignment was held on the rioting charge and Justice Robert F. Smith granted bail of $500 (equivalent to $17,277 in 2025) for each of the defendants.

After bail was granted under the previous charge, Augustine Spencer immediately swore out a warrant alleging that Smith had committed treason by "calling out the [Nauvoo] Legion to resist the force under the command of the Governor." On June 24, 1844, a warrant was issued charging that "Joseph Smith, late of the county aforesaid, did, on or about the nineteenth day of June. A. D. 1844, at the county and state aforesaid, commit the crime of treason against the government and people of the State of Illinois".

Bail could not be granted for a charge of treason, so Smith was placed in jail where he was accompanied by his brother, Hyrum Smith, and other associates. On June 27, Smith and Hyrum were killed by a mob in jail while they were awaiting trial.

== Table of events ==
Charge date	Warrant date	Prosecution	Charge	Outcome	Issuing judge	Co-defendants
	March 20, 1826	State of New York	Disorderly person	Disputed outcome, but freed	Albert Neely	
~June 28, 1830	June 1830	State of New York	Disorderly person	Not guilty	Joseph P. Chamberlin	
June 30, 1830	June 1830	State of New York	Disorderly person	Not guilty	Three justices forming a court of special sessions	
Between June 16-20 1835	April 1835	State of Ohio	Assault on Calvin Stoddard	Not guilty	Lewis Miller	
	Autumn 1836		Assault on visiting minister	Dismissed after complainant fled county		
April 13, 1837	June 1837	State of Ohio	Conspiracy to murder Grandison Newell	Charges dismissed	Justice Flint, Justice Humphrey	
~April 10, 1839	August 10, 1838	State of Missouri	Threatening Judge Adam Black	Fled from Missouri to Illinois	Austin A King	Lyman Wight
	November 12, 1838		Receipt of stolen goods, larceny, riot, arson, treason against Missouri, and murder	Escaped custody and fled from Missouri to Illinois	Austin A King	Lyman Wight, Hyrum Smith, Alexander McRay, Caleb Baldwin
	August 1842		Conspiracy to murder Gov. Boggs	In hiding from Aug 10 to Dec 30; surrendered and was freed by US District Court on Jan 2, 1843	Nathaniel Pope	Porter Rockwell
	June 6, 1843		Treason against Missouri	Illinois courts rejected Missouri's requests for extradition	Daviess County Grand Jury	
	August 1, 1843		Assault and battery on Walter Bagby	Guilty, fined $3-100 (Adjusted by inflation: $104-3455)	Newel K. Whitney	
	September 17, 1843		Assault and battery on Mr. Bennett of Warsaw	Acquitted by Nauvoo municipal court	George Rockwell	
	May 1844		Perjury, fornication and adultery	Killed while awaiting trial	Hancock County Grand Jury	
	June 11, 1844		Inciting a riot	Granted $500 bail (equivalent to $17,277 in 2025); killed while awaiting trial	Thomas Morrison	Samuel Bennett, John Taylor, William W. Phelps, Hyrum Smith, John P. Greene, Stephen Perry, Dimick B. Huntington, Jonathan Dunham, Stephen Markham, William Edwards, Jonathan Holmes, Jesse P. Harmon, John Lytle, Joseph W. Coolidge, Harvey D. Redfield, Porter Rockwell, and Levi Richards
	June 24, 1844		Treason against Illinois	Killed while awaiting trial	Robert F. Smith	Hyrum Smith

== Religious significance in Mormonism ==
The Church of Jesus Christ of Latter-day Saints (LDS Church) considers Smith to be a persecuted prophet. The Church website states:

Few have confronted more antagonism and trials than did Joseph Smith. He was besieged with dozens of unjustified lawsuits and was often in jeopardy of his life. He was poisoned, beaten, tarred, unjustly imprisoned, and once sentenced to die by firing squad. He and Emma seldom had a home of their own, and six of their children died in infancy. Financial difficulties continually plagued the family.

"As for the perils which I am called to pass through," Joseph reflected, "they seem but a small thing to me, as the envy and wrath of man have been my common lot all the days of my life. It all has become a second nature to me; and I feel, like Paul, to glory in tribulation; for to this day has the God of my fathers delivered me out of them all."

Mormons often liken the treatment of Smith to the persecution of other biblical figures who faced religious persecution. Smith is considered a martyr by the LDS Church due to his 1844 death at the hands of a mob while awaiting trial.
