= True Church of Jesus Christ of Latter Day Saints =

Denomination of the Latter Day Saint movement

The True Church of Jesus Christ of Latter Day Saints or True Mormon Church was a denomination of the Latter Day Saint movement. It was founded on April 21, 1844, in Nauvoo, Illinois, by leaders dissenting from the Church of Jesus Christ of Latter Day Saints.

The True Church's president was William Law, a former counselor to the movement's founder, Joseph Smith (then president of the Church). Law was joined by his brother, Wilson Law, along with Robert D. Foster, Charles A. Foster, Francis M. Higbee, Chauncey L. Higbee and Charles Ivins. Members of the True Church believed that "Mormonism" as it had been originally practiced was true, but that the practice of plural marriage in particular was a corruption. William Law did not claim to be a prophet, but merely the president of the church. The church taught that Smith was a "fallen prophet".

This group was responsible for printing the Nauvoo Expositor, which was also critical of Smith and polygamy, leading to his death and contributing to the expulsion of the Latter Day Saints from Nauvoo.
