= Attempted assassination of Lilburn Boggs =

1842 attack on former Governor of Missouri

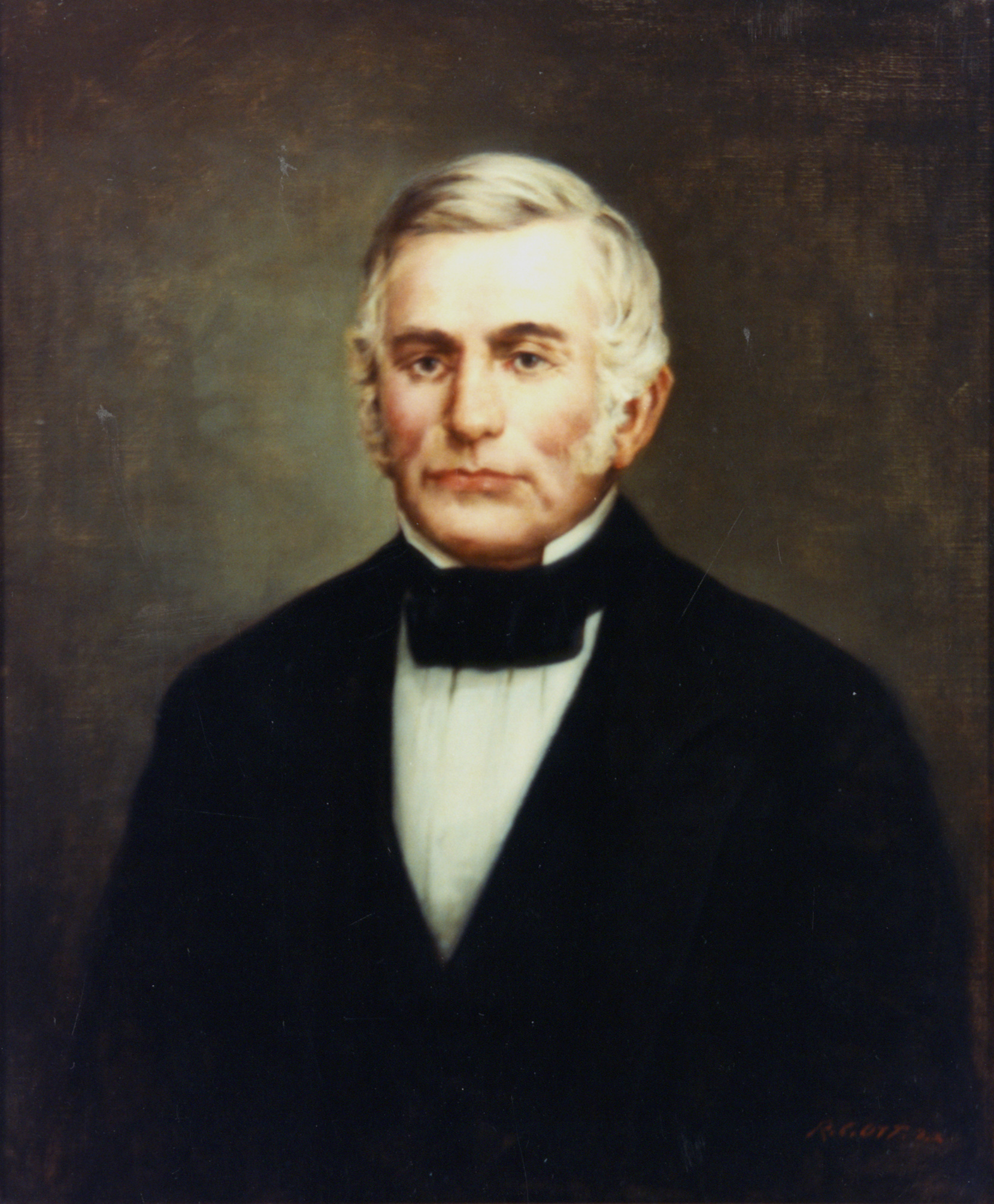
Lilburn Boggs, the target of the attempt

An attempted assassination of Lilburn Boggs occurred on May 6, 1842, when an unknown assailant fired buckshot into the home of Lilburn Boggs, striking the former Missouri Governor. Boggs was shot through a window as he read a newspaper in his study and was hit in four places: two balls were lodged in his skull, a third lodged in his neck, and a fourth entered his throat and was swallowed. Boggs was severely injured. Several doctors—Boggs's brother among them—pronounced his injuries fatal, and at least one newspaper ran an obituary. To general surprise, Boggs not only survived, but his condition gradually improved.

The crime was investigated by Sheriff J.H. Reynolds, who discovered a revolver at the scene, still loaded with buckshot. He surmised that the suspect had fired upon Boggs and lost his firearm in the dark rainy night when the weapon recoiled due to its unusually large shot. The gun had been stolen from a local shopkeeper, who identified "that hired man of Ward's" as the "most likely culprit".

== Context and aftermath ==
In the wake of the 1838 Mormon War, which saw armed conflict between the Missouri State Guard and a Mormon militia, Governor Boggs issued Missouri Executive Order 44, known by Mormons as the "Extermination Order", branding Mormons "enemies [who] must be exterminated or driven from the state if necessary for the public peace".

News of the attack reached Nauvoo around May 14.

On May 21, the Quincy Whig reported that "There are several rumors in circulation ... one of which throws the crime upon the Mormons—from the fact, we suppose, that Mr. Boggs was governor at the time, and no small degree instrumental in driving them from the State. Smith ... prophesied a year or so ago, his death by violent means."

Some Mormons saw the assassination attempt positively: An anonymous contributor to The Wasp, a pro-Mormon newspaper in Nauvoo, Illinois, wrote on May 28 that "Boggs is undoubtedly killed according to report; but who did the noble deed remains to be found out."

=== John C. Bennett's accusations ===
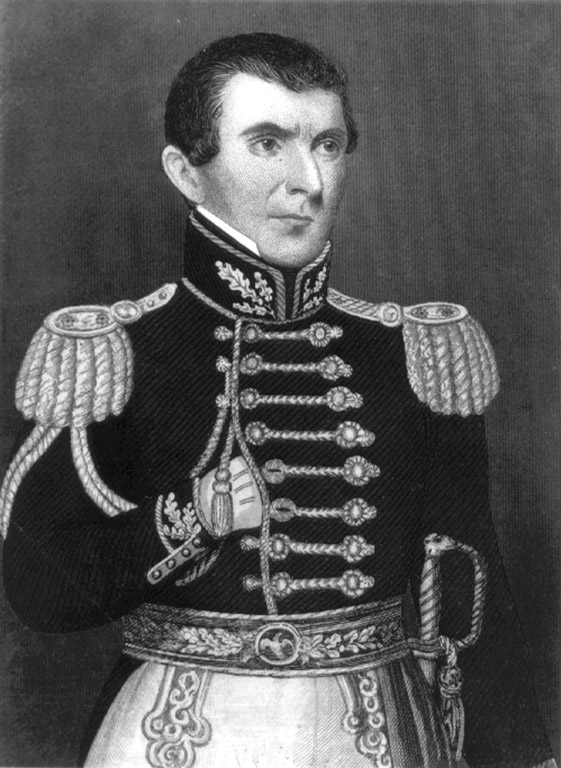
Engraving of John C. Bennett, formerly Mayor of Nauvoo and Major General of the Nauvoo Legion

The Sangamo Journal published a letter by John C. Bennett, a recently excommunicated Mormon who, prior to the assassination, had served as mayor of Nauvoo, Major General of the Nauvoo Legion, and Chancellor of the University of Nauvoo.

Bennett made a number of controversial allegations. Firstly, he claimed that Joseph Smith personally threatened him and forced him to make a false statement under oath. Bennett's letters also alleged, in detail, the practice of Mormon polygamy in Nauvoo.

Bennett implicated Smith in the assassination attempt, writing:

"In 1841, Joe Smith predicted or prophesied in a public congregation in Nauvoo, that Lilburn W Boggs, ex-Governor of Missouri, should die by violent hands within one year. From one or two months prior to the attempted assassination of Gov. Boggs, Mr. O. P. Rockwell left Nauvoo for parts unknown to the citizens at large. I was then on terms of close intimacy with Joe Smith, and asked him where Rockwell had gone? "Gone," said he, "GONE TO FULFILL PROPHECY!" Rockwell returned to Nauvoo the day before the report of the assassination reached there."

Smith and his supporters vehemently denied Bennett's account.

=== Porter Rockwell ===
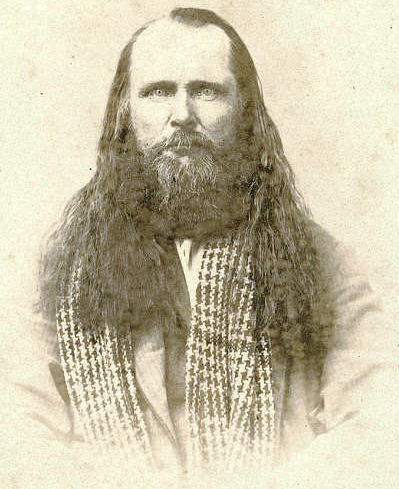
Porter Rockwell, an early and close associate of Joseph Smith, was accused of having committed the shooting.

Officials accused Orrin Porter Rockwell, one of Smith's longest and closest followers.

Rockwell was one of the first members of the Latter Day Saint movement. At 16 years old, Rockwell was baptized into The Church of Jesus Christ of Latter-day Saints on April 6, 1830, the day the church was organized; it is most likely that Rockwell was the youngest member of the first group to be baptized into the church.

Rockwell was eight years younger than Joseph Smith. When Smith was publishing the Book of Mormon, Rockwell would work by picking berries at midnight and hauling wood into town in order to help pay for the publishing of the book.

Rockwell served as a loyal personal bodyguard to both Smith and Brigham Young.

=== Arrest of Smith and Rockwell attempted ===
On July 20, Boggs issued a sworn statement saying that he "believes, and has good reason to believe from evidence and information now in his possession, that Joseph Smith, commonly called the Mormon Prophet, was accessory before the fact of the intended murder;" Current Missouri Governor Reynolds requested "the surrender and delivery of the said Joseph Smith" to Edward R. Ford. Illinois governor Thomas Carlin issued arrest warrants for Joseph Smith and Porter Rockwell.

On August 8, Smith and Rockwell were placed under arrest by Thomas King, the deputy sheriff of Adams County, and two other officers. The defendants were ordered to be freed by the Municipal Court of Nauvoo. The officers did not recognize the authority of the municipal court, and left the prisoners in the custody of the city marshal.

=== Defendants in hiding ===
On August 10, Sheriff Thomas King returned to Nauvoo and found both men had been released by the city marshal. Both Smith and Rockwell had fled to avoid arrest. Smith initially fled from Missouri to Iowa territory. He remained in hiding in various locations for months.

On September 20, Governor Carlin issued a reward of $200 for each man, describing them as "fugitives from justice". In October, Governor Reynolds of Missouri offered an additional reward of $300 each.

=== Surrender of Joseph Smith ===
On December 8, Governor Carlin's term ended and Thomas Ford became Governor of Illinois.

On December 26, Smith surrendered to church member Wilson Law and they traveled to Springfield, arriving on the 30th. Smith was granted bail in the sum of $4,000 and a hearing was scheduled for the following week.

In a hearing on January 2, 1843, Smith was defended by US District Attorney Justin Butterfield in Federal Circuit Court before Judge Nathaniel Pope. Pope quashed the warrant and ordered Smith released.

=== Arrest of Porter Rockwell ===
O.P. Rockwell was apprehended in St. Louis on March 6, 1843. In late May, Rockwell briefly escaped from the Independence jail where he was being held.

On September 30, 1843, it was reported:

"Orin Porter Rockwell, the Mormon confined in our county jail some time since for the attempted assassination of ex-governor Boggs, was indicted by our last grand jury for escaping from the cointy jail some weeks since, and sent to Clay county for trial. Owing, however, to some informality in the proceedings, he was remanded to this county again for trial. There was not sufficient proof adduced against him to justify an indictment for shooting ex-Governor Boggs; and the grand jury, therefore, did not indict him for that offence."

Though never indicted for the attempted assassination, Rockwell was tried and convicted of jailbreak. Rockwell was released on December 13, 1843—ten months after his arrest.

=== Joseph Smith's denial ===
Joseph Smith vehemently denied involvement in the assassination attempt, telling he had neither paid Rockwell to assassinate Boggs, nor prophesied of the attempt. Rockwell also denied that Smith paid him.

=== Joseph H. Jackson's accusations ===
On June 1, Joseph H. Jackson wrote a letter to the Warsaw Signal in which he publicly claimed that Joseph Smith had admitted to sending "O.P. Rockwell to Missouri to assassinate Gov. Boggs". Jackson further stated that he had tricked Smith into believing him an assassin, after which Smith purportedly offered him $3000 to "do what Rockwell had failed to do, to wit: take the life of Boggs."

=== William Law's accusation ===
In 1887, more than 40 years after the events, former Latter Day Saint William Law gave an interview to the Salt Lake Tribune in which he claimed Joseph Smith had admitted a role in the assassination; Law reported that Smith stated, "I sent Rockwell to kill Boggs, but he missed him, it was a failure; he wounded him instead of sending him to Hell."
