= Francis M. Higbee =

Early Mormon

Francis Marion Higbee (1820, Tate, Ohio – 3 June 1856, Cumberland, Rhode Island) was an early member of the Latter Day Saint movement. He attained the rank of Colonel in the Nauvoo Legion.

== Early life ==
Higbee was born in Tate, Ohio, as the son of Elias Higbee and Sarah Elizabeth Ward. He was the brother of Chauncey L. Higbee.

In 1830, Higbee moved to Fulton, Ohio.

== Baptism ==
Higbee was baptized into The Church of Jesus Christ of Latter Day Saints in 1832. In 1833, he moved to Jackson County, Missouri, and moved in 1835 to Kirtland, Ohio. The next year, he traveled back to Missouri.

In the aftermath of the 1838 Mormon War, Higbee was arraigned along with Smith, in Richmond, Missouri on November 11, 1838. He was released 18 days later.

== Conflict with Smith ==
On June 30, 1842, Higbee gave a sworn statement that "Joseph Smith told [him] that John C. Bennett could be easily put aside or drowned, and no person would be the wiser for it".

On January 15, 1844, the Nauvoo Municipal Court issued a warrant for his arrest on the affidavit of Orson Pratt.

According to History of the Church, Higbee was present at a meeting of dissenters on April 28, 1844.

On May 1, 1844, Higbee filed a legal complaint in the Fifth Judicial District of Illinois, suing Smith for slander, with requested damages of five thousand dollars. Smith was killed before the legal suit was resolved.

== Nauvoo Expositor and Smith's death ==
On May 18, 1844, the church excommunicated Higbee, Charles Ivins, and Austin Cowles of the Nauvoo High Council, for apostasy. On May 29, the High Council published a document purporting to show Higbee's brother Chauncey had also committed misdeeds.

In 1844, Higbee became an editor of the Nauvoo Expositor along with his brother Chauncey and several others. The single edition of the Expositor included statements critical of Smith and other church leaders. After the press was destroyed, Higbee swore an oath before a Hancock County, Illinois, justice that Smith had incited a riot. On the basis of this testimony, an arrest warrant was issued for Smith and 17 others.

Smith surrendered to authorities and was killed by a mob in Carthage Jail while awaiting trial.

== Later life ==
Higbee was listed as a resident of Hancock County in 1850. On November 23, 1854 he married Ann Maria Allen, in Cumberland, Rhode Island, where he died two years later.
