= Sylvester Emmons =

American politician

Sylvester Emmons (28 February 1808 – 15 November 1881) was an American attorney, local politician in Illinois, and newspaper publisher.

He was born in New Jersey.

== Life in Nauvoo, Illinois ==
Emmons moved to Illinois in 1840, and in 1843 was elected to the Nauvoo City Council, despite being a non-Mormon in an LDS-majority town.

On June 7, 1844, Emmons became editor of the Nauvoo Expositor, which published a single issue that made statements critical of then-Mayor Joseph Smith and other LDS church leaders. After Smith ordered the destruction of the press, Smith was arrested, and subsequently killed by a mob while awaiting trial.

== Later life ==
Emmons moved Beardstown, Illinois, and became the editor of the town's Gazette. He died in November 1881.
