= Robert D. Foster =

American physician and early Latter Day Saint

Robert D. Foster (14 March 1811 – 1 February 1878) was a 19th-century physician and an early member of the Latter Day Saint movement, being baptized into the Church of Christ (later renamed the Church of Jesus Christ of Latter-day Saints) sometime before October 1839.

== Early life ==
Foster was born in Braunston, England on March 14, 1811. He was the son of John Foster and Jane Knibb. He was the brother of Charles A. Foster. Foster married Sarah Phinney on 18 July 1837 at Medina County, Ohio. He and Phinney had two children: a son and a daughter. Foster was baptized into the Church of Christ, and, in October 1839, he was ordained to be an elder of the church while living in Nauvoo, Illinois.

== Latter Day Saint movement ==
After joining the church, Foster accompanied Joseph Smith, the founder of the Latter Day Saint movement, to Washington, D.C. in March 1840 to help "draft Senate Committee reports" on the Missouri redress issue. Foster was then mentioned by name in a revelation dated January 19, 1841, in which Joseph Smith states that Foster should build Smith a house in Nauvoo:

And again, verily I say unto you, if my servant Robert D. Foster will obey my voice, let him build a house for my servant Joseph, according to the contract which he has made with him, as the door shall be open to him from time to time.

And let him repent of all his folly, and clothe himself with charity; and cease to do evil, and lay aside all his hard speeches;

And pay stock also into the hands of the quorum of the Nauvoo House, for himself and for his generation after him, from generation to generation;

And hearken unto the counsel of my servants Joseph, and Hyrum, and William Law, and unto the authorities which I have called to lay the foundation of Zion;

Foster helped build and purchased stock in the resulting Mansion House.

Foster was appointed surgeon general in the Nauvoo Legion in March 1841 and he was a Regent of the University of Nauvoo from 1841 to 1844. He was also involved in the Nauvoo Masonic Lodge and the Nauvoo Agricultural and Manufacturing Association. Foster also served as Hancock County Magistrate.

In April 1843, Foster traveled to Tioga County, New York to serve a mission. However, after his return, he began to gamble and speak out against the church. Foster was excommunicated from the church on 18 April 1844, in Nauvoo for "immorality and apostacy" after Joseph Smith charged Foster with character defamation, lying, and endangering his life in the Nauvoo High Council. He was subsequently released from his position in the Nauvoo Legion.

== Nauvoo Expositor and death of Joseph Smith ==
After his excommunication, Foster became a publisher of the Nauvoo Expositor, which was critical of the church and Smith. Foster helped write the June 7, 1844 issue of the newspaper that led Smith to order the destruction of the press, leading to Smith's arrest and ultimately to his death. Foster had previously joined discussions in which the murder of Joseph Smith was planned, but never saw these efforts through himself. After Joseph and Hyrum Smith were shot and killed at Carthage Jail, Foster was "charged and acquitted of their murder."

In a conversation with Abraham Hodge, Foster expressed regret at having played a hand in Joseph's and Hyrum's deaths.

== Later life ==
Foster was an apostle in the church formed by First Presidency member William Law.

In 1850, Foster moved to Canandaigua, New York and worked there as a physician. In 1860, he moved to Loda, Illinois, where he died on February 1, 1878. He was 67 years old.
