= University of Nauvoo =

University in Illinois (1841–1845)

The University of Nauvoo was a short-lived university in Nauvoo, Illinois.

After the Church of Jesus Christ of Latter Day Saints had been expelled from Missouri, they crossed into Illinois and settled in Nauvoo in 1839. They were granted a city charter from the Illinois state legislature in December 1840, which included authorization to found a university. The school was founded in 1841 as the University of the City of Nauvoo.

Several notable leaders in the Church of Jesus Christ of Latter Day Saints acted as officials and staff. The chancellor was John C. Bennett, the registrar was William Law, and among the regents were Joseph Smith, Sidney Rigdon, Hyrum Smith, William Marks, Samuel H. Smith, Daniel H. Wells, Newel K. Whitney, Charles C. Rich, Don Carlos Smith, John P. Greene, Elias Higbee, James Adams, Robert B. Thompson, Samuel C. Bennett, and George Miller. On February 15, 1841, James Kelley (A. M., Trinity College, Dublin) was elected as university president.

The institution "probably was among the first municipal universities in the United States". A building committee was organized, though there was no campus. Many American colleges at that time were "one-building affairs" and "in fact not colleges at all, but glorified high schools or academies that presumed to offer degrees." Shortly after its organization, the Nauvoo city council delegated oversight of common schools to the university regents and chancellor.

However, the University of Nauvoo was ambitious in its plan to offer languages (German, French, Latin, Greek, and Hebrew), mathematics, chemistry, geology, literature, and history. While "the data are too scant" on the quality of the academic instruction, the faculty included Sidney Rigdon, Orson Spencer, and most notably, Orson Pratt, and were considered "considerable scholarship … a rather remarkable group to be found in a frontier city". David P. Gardner believes "it was probably superior to the average secondary [schools] of the time."

The Times and Seasons, the church newspaper in Nauvoo, in 1841 announced that "the department of English literature is now in successful operation" and advised that the university was ready to offer a "general course of mathematics, including arithmetic, algebra, geometry, conic sections, plane trigonometry, mensuration, surveying, navigation, analytical, plane and spherical trigonometry, analytical geometry, and the differential and integral calculus." Courses in philosophy, astronomy, and chemistry were also to be taught. Later, a department of music was added.

After the 1844 murder of Joseph Smith, the interest of many church leaders moved toward westward migration. In January 1845, the legislature abolished the Nauvoo Charter, disincorporating the municipality and placing its assets into receivership.
