= Joseph H. Jackson (Nauvoo Legion) =

Joseph H. Jackson was a resident of Nauvoo, Illinois in the 1840s. He played a role in Mormon founder Joseph Smith's arrest, which ultimately lead to his killing at the hands of a lynch mob.

Jackson arrived in Nauvoo on October 10, 1842. He spent the winter of 1842–1843 in Carthage, returning to Nauvoo in the Spring. On January 5, 1844, Jackson was appointed aide-de-camp to Joseph Smith in his capacity as leader of the Nauvoo Legion. On May 23, 1844, Jackson provided testimony before a grand jury that led to Smith's indictment for perjury. On May 27, Joseph Smith entered Carthage, where Charles Foster reportedly told Joseph Smith that Joseph Jackson planned to kill him.

On June 1, Jackson authored a letter to the editor of the Warsaw Signal which was published. In it he alleged that Joseph Smith had sent Porter Rockwell to assassinate Missouri governor Lilburn Boggs, offered Jackson $3000 to kill Boggs. He further accused Smith of counterfeiting.

On June 21, he swore two affidavits about recent events in Nauvoo. In August 1844, Jackson published a pamphlet about his experiences in Nauvoo. In that document, Jackson alleged that Smith has issued revelations to marry three members of his own family: his brother William's wife Caroline, his sister Lucy, and his niece Lavina.. In 1846 a book was published recalling his account.

== See also ==
- John C. Bennett, an earlier leader of the Nauvoo Legion who broke with Smith
- Nauvoo Expositor, the press that exposed Smith's polygamy, was destroyed on Smith's order, and led to his killing at the hands of a lynch mob
