= Charles A. Foster (Latter Day Saints) =

Charles A. Foster (1 September 1815 - 25 November 1904) was involved in the Latter Day Saint movement but was never a church member. He was the brother of Robert D. Foster.

== Foster-Higbee embroilment ==
The History of the Church records Foster's arrest in Nauvoo, Illinois.

The May 1, 1844, edition of the Nauvoo Neighbor contained a statement from Marshal Greene alleging that Foster "drew a double-barrel pistol on Mr. [Joseph] Smith".

The Mayor [Smith] ordered me to arrest these three men for refusing to assist me in the discharge of my duty; and when attempting to arrest them, they all resisted, and with horrid imprecations threatened to shoot.

I called for help, and there not being sufficient, the Mayor laid hold on the two Fosters at the same time. At that instant Charles A. Foster drew a double-barrel pistol on Mr. Smith, but it was instantly wrenched from his hand; and afterwards he declared he would have shot the Mayor, if we had let his pistol alone, and also he would thank God for the privilege of ridding the world of a tyrant! [...] However, the three were arrested and brought before the Mayor [...] upon which evidence the court assessed a fine of one hundred dollars to each of the above-named aggressors.

According to History of the Church, Smith said that "about May 27", Foster had informed Smith of a conspiracy against his life.

== Nauvoo Expositor and the death of Joseph Smith ==
In 1844, Foster became a publisher of the Nauvoo Expositor.

In a letter to the Warsaw Signal published June 11, 1844, Foster wrote of the destruction of the press.

Smith's order to destroy the newspaper's press ultimately led to Smith's arrest and death while awaiting trial.

== Later life ==
During the Civil War, Foster served in key roles on the medical staff of the Union Army. He oversaw the government hospital in Memphis, Tennessee, which later became the State Hospital at Natchez, and in 1864, he managed the main hospital of the Union Army located on the Jefferson Davis plantation in Mississippi. After the war, he settled in Vicksburg, Mississippi, where he gained considerable recognition. He served multiple terms as the city's mayor and was elected to the Mississippi State Legislature several times. Later, Dr. Foster moved north, practicing medicine in Auburn, New York, before eventually relocating to Canandaigua, New York.
