= Chauncey L. Higbee =

American politician

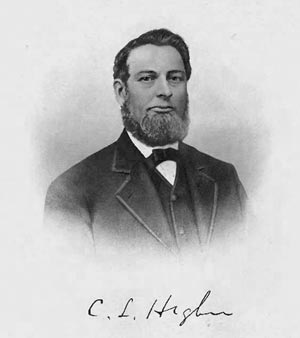
Chauncey L. Higbee

Chauncey Lawson Higbee (September 7, 1821 – December 7, 1884) was a member of the Latter Day Saint movement in Nauvoo, Illinois, and a brother to fellow Latter Day Saint Francis M. Higbee.

He later successfully ran for office, serving in the Illinois legislature. He was elected as judge, eventually serving on the state Appellant Court.

== Role in the Church of Christ ==
Chauncey Higbee joined the Church of Christ in 1832. In November 1841, he was appointed aide-de-camp to Major General John C. Bennett of the Nauvoo Legion.

== Charges of adultery ==
On May 29, 1844, the church's high council ordered the publication of testimony and affidavits which purported to be accounts of Higbee's trial before the high council two years earlier. According to the documents, Higbee had been accused of "adulterous sins" and tried on May 24, 1842. Included were statements from women claiming he had committed adultery by telling them that Joseph Smith secretly preached the practice of polygamy. In response, Higbee was excommunicated from the church.

== Nauvoo Expositor ==
In June 1844, Higbee became a publisher of the Nauvoo Expositor, a newspaper critical of church founder Joseph Smith and other church leaders. After Smith ordered the destruction of the Expositor press, he was arrested on charges of riot and treason. Smith was killed while awaiting trial.

== Later life ==
In 1854, he married Julia M. White.

Higbee was a member of the Illinois House of Representatives in 1854 and from 1858 to 1861 was a member of the Illinois Senate. In 1861, Higbee was elected to the circuit court, and he was elected to the appellate court in 1877. In 1864, he was listed as a presidential elector for George B. McClellan.

== Public honors ==
A public school in Pittsfield, Illinois, was named in honor of Chauncey L. Higbee. Higbee's widow, Julia, donated money to aid in the building's construction in honor of her late husband. The building was constructed in 1908, and Chauncey L. Higbee High School served the community until a newer building was built in 1954. In 1955, the school was repurposed as Chauncey L. Higbee Jr. High, and was open until the last student was graduated from 8th grade in 1996. The building was demolished in 2014.

A street in Pittsfield is also named for Higbee. The current Pittsfield High School (Illinois) is located at 201 E Higbee Street.
