= Nauvoo Charter =

Document establishing the city of Navoo, Illinois in 1840

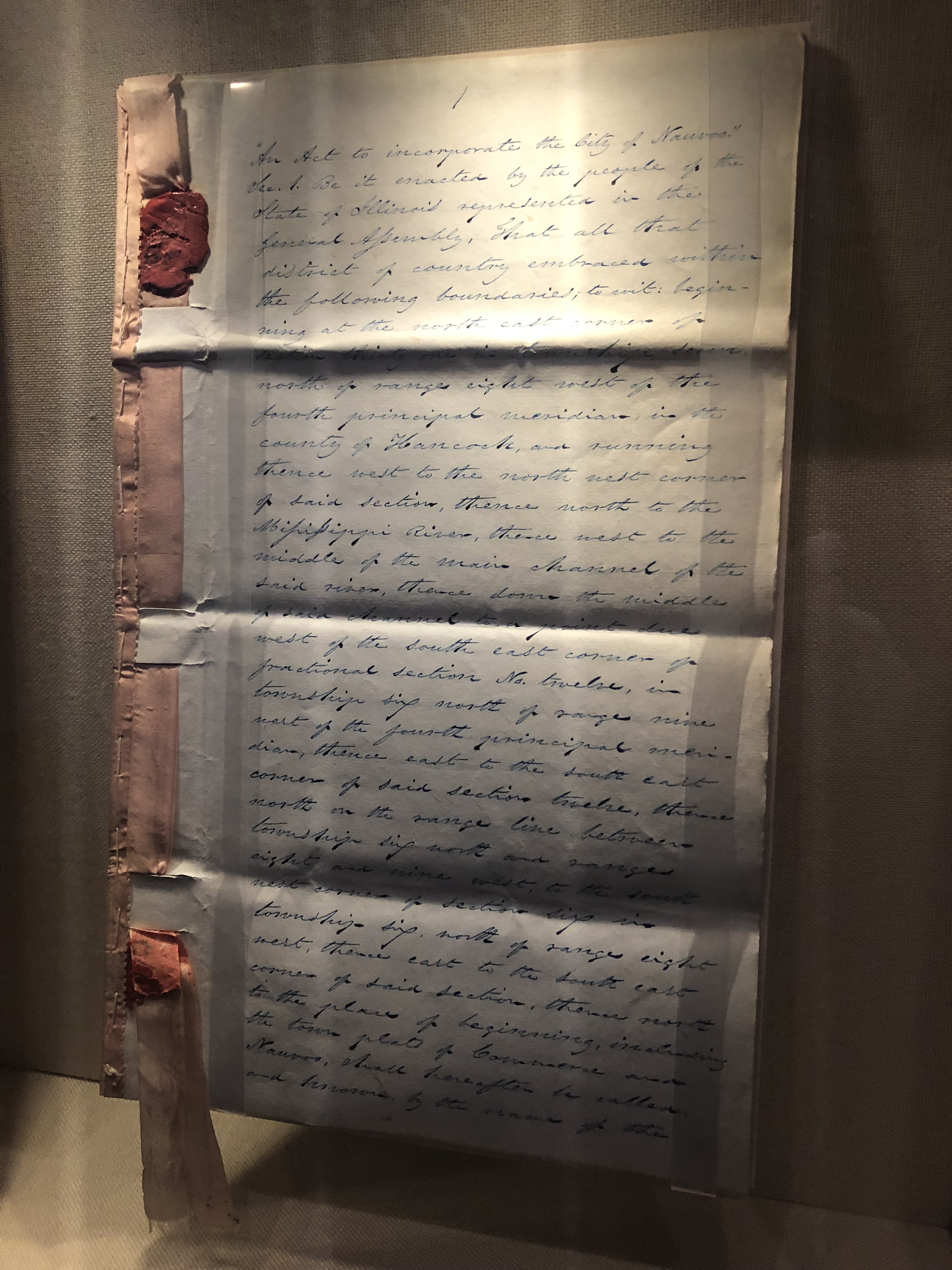
Nauvoo Charter

The Nauvoo Charter was passed by the Illinois Legislature on December 16, 1840, for the governance of the City of Nauvoo, Illinois. According to the charter, members of the City Council also sat on the Municipal Court – for example, the Mayor doubled in the role of Chief Justice. It was abolished in January 1845.

== Municipal governance ==
=== City Council ===
The Nauvoo City Council was a short-lived municipal body established through the charter for the city. The legislature established the Nauvoo City Council, consisting of the Mayor, four Aldermen, and nine Councilors. By state law, each office held a two-year term.

=== Municipal Court ===
The Municipal Court of Nauvoo was the judicial body founded by the charter. The legislature mandated that "The Municipal Court shall sit on the first Monday of every month, and the City Council at such times and place as may be prescribed by city ordinance; special meetings of which may at any time be called by the Mayor or any two Aldermen."

The Municipal Court could hear citizen appeals, with the charter saying: "Appeals may be had from any decision or judgment of said Mayor or Aldermen, arising under the city ordinances, to the Municipal Court under such regulations as may be presented by ordinance;"

The Act stated that the Municipal Court "shall be composed of the Mayor as Chief Justice, and the Aldermen as Associate Justices". According to the charter, "The Municipal Court shall have power to grant writs of habeas corpus in all cases arising under the ordinances of the City Council."

==== Notable cases ====
On August 8, 1842, the court released Smith and Rockwell after they were arrested and charged with the attempted assassination of Lilburn Boggs, former Governor of Missouri.

On July 1, 1843, the court intervened in a case against Joseph Smith. The Governor of Missouri issued a writ authorizing the arrest and extradition of Joseph Smith on the charge of treason. The Governor charged Joseph H. Reynolds with arresting and conveying Smith to Daviess County, Missouri. The Municipal Court of Nauvoo dismissed the charges against Smith.

In June 1844, the Circuit Court for Hancock County of Illinois charged Joseph Smith, Hyrum Smith, and 15 other co-defendants with inciting a "riot" in the destruction of the Nauvoo Expositor. In response, the Municipal Court of Nauvoo dismissed all State charges (despite being a municipal, not state, court).

== Abolition ==
In January 1845, the Illinois state legislature repealed the Nauvoo Charter by a vote of 25–14 in the Senate and 75–31 in the House. Nauvoo was dis-incorporated and its assets placed into a receivership.

== List of city officials ==
Chief Justice (Mayor)

1. John C. Bennett February 1, 1841 – May 17, 1842
2. Joseph Smith May 19, 1842 – June 27, 1844
3. Chancy Robison

Associate Justices (Aldermen)

- Daniel H. Wells (3 Feb. 1841 – 3 Feb. 1845)
- William Marks (3 Feb. 1841 – 6 Feb. 1843)
- Newel K. Whitney (3 Feb. 1841 – 6 Feb. 1843)
- Samuel H. Smith (3 Feb. 1841 – 23 May 1842)
- Gustavus Hills (23 Oct. 1841–6 Feb. 1843)
- Orson Spencer (23 Oct. 1841–3 Feb. 1845)
- George W. Harris (30 Oct. 1841–after 8 Feb. 1845)
- Hiram Kimball (30 Oct. 1841–6 Feb. 1843)
- George A. Smith (11 Feb. 1843–10 Aug. 1844)
- William D. Huntington (4 Sept. 1841–ca. 1846)
- Dimick B. Huntington (23 Oct. 1841–9 Apr. 1842), (23 May 1842–ca. 1846)
- William Clayton (9 Sept. 1842–ca. 1846)
- John Fullmer (4 Sept. 1841–9 Sept. 1842)
- Robert B. Thompson (3 Feb. 1841–27 Aug. 1841)
- Samuel Bennett (4 Mar. 1843– 3 Feb. 1845)

== See also ==
- Nauvoo Legion - Municipal militia authorized by the Nauvoo charter.
