= Solomon Wilbur Denton =

American Latter Day Saint

Solomon Wilbur Denton Sr. (1816–1864) was an early member of the Latter Day Saint movement.

== Early life ==
Denton was born in Fitchville, Huron County, Ohio.

== In the Latter Day Saint church ==
In 1831, Denton joined Joseph Smith's Church of Christ and moved to Independence, Missouri to join the Latter Day Saints there. On March 1, 1835, he was ordained an elder in the church. Denton worked with Don Carlos Smith in the Kirtland, Ohio printing office of the church. In 1835, he married Fanny M. Stanley (Smith's first cousin once removed). He reported "having seen a great vision during the time of the washings and the annointings" in the Kirtland Temple. Denton was also a helper in Smith's household.

In 1835, Denton issued a sworn statement claiming that he had been part of a plot to murder Grandison Newell.

== Later life ==
In 1837, Denton was excommunicated from the church for "lack of faith, non-observance of duties, and contempt of the quorum of High Priests." He moved to Pontiac, Michigan, where he was co-editor of a newspaper and later postmaster. Denton died in Pontiac.
