= Charles Ivins =

Charles Ivins (April 16, 1799 – January 29, 1875) was an early member of the Latter Day Saint movement and a publisher of the Nauvoo Expositor.

== Early life ==
Ivins was born to Israel Ivins and Margaret Woodward in Burlington County, New Jersey.

On May 1, 1823, Ivins married Elizabeth Lippencott Shinn.

== Baptized into the Latter Day Saint church ==
While living in New Jersey in February 1840, Ivins was baptized into the Church of Jesus Christ of Latter Day Saints. In Spring 1841, Ivins moved to Nauvoo, Illinois to join the main gathering of church members

On April 28, 1844, those dissenting from the leadership of Joseph Smith at Nauvoo formed their own church, appointing Ivins to the post of bishop.

== Nauvoo Expositor and the death of Joseph Smith ==
Ivins was excommunicated from the church on May 18, 1844, and subsequently became one of the publishers of the Nauvoo Expositor, a newspaper critical of Joseph Smith and other church leaders. After Smith ordered the newspaper's press destroyed, Smith was arrested and ultimately killed by a mob while awaiting trial.

== Later life ==
In 1845, a year after Smith's death, Ivins moved to Keokuk, Iowa, where he engaged in various professions, including merchant, hotelier, ferry owner, and farmer. He remained in Keokuk until his death on January 29, 1875.
