= Wilson Law =

Irish-American journalist

Wilson Law (26 February 1806 – 15 October 1876) was an Irish-American early member of the Latter Day Saint movement, known for his civic leadership roles and later dissent within the church.

== Early life and conversion ==
He was born in Ireland and emigrated with his family to the United States in 1820, settling in Mercer County, Pennsylvania. He joined the Church of Jesus Christ of Latter Day Saints in Commerce, Illinois, later Nauvoo the late 1830s. His younger brother, William Law, had joined the church a few years earlier.

== Leadership in Nauvoo ==
By 1839, Law was ordained an elder. In Nauvoo, he held several significant civic positions, including serving in the Nauvoo Legion, the Nauvoo Masonic Lodge, and the Nauvoo City Council.

== Dissent and the Nauvoo Expositor ==
In 1844, Wilson Law supported his brother in criticizing church founder Joseph Smith. Their dissent led to their excommunication on April 18, 1844. Following this, the Law brothers became publishers of the Nauvoo Expositor, a newspaper that was critical of Smith's practices. The Nauvoo City Council ordered the destruction of the press, an action that escalated tensions and ultimately contributed to Joseph Smith's arrest and subsequent death.

== Later life ==
Law married Elizabeth F. Sikes on December 25, 1842. They moved briefly to Burlington, Iowa Territory, June 1844, and then to Hampton, Illinois, by October. He ultimately relocated to Shullsburg, Lafayette County, Wisconsin. Law continued his life away from the religious conflicts that had marked his earlier years. He died on October 15, 1876, in Shullsburg.

Wilson Law's journey from a dedicated church leader to a vocal dissenter highlights the complexities and internal conflicts within the early Latter Day Saint movement.
