= John P. Greene =

American religious leader (1793–1844)

John Portineus Greene (September 3, 1793 – September 10, 1844) was an early leader in the Latter Day Saint movement.

Greene was born in Herkimer, New York. He was a Methodist minister at Mendon, New York. He was friends with Heber C. Kimball and they claimed to witness "signs in the heavens" on September 22, 1827. He later met Latter Day Saint missionary Samuel Harrison Smith, who gifted Greene a copy of the Book of Mormon. Greene joined the Latter Day Saint church in April 1832, as did the family of his wife Rhoda, which included Brigham Young.

Greene would serve a total of 11 missions for the church. In May 1834, Greene baptized three people while serving as a missionary in Villanova in Chautauqua County, New York. He was the original president of the Eastern States Mission in May 1839. He published a pamphlet about the 1838 expulsion of the members of The Church of Jesus Christ of Latter-day Saints from Missouri in 1839 entitled Facts Relative to the Expulsion of the Mormons or Latter-Day Saints from the State of Missouri, Under the Extermination Order. This was one of the first significant historical works published by a member of the Church.

In 1844, Greene was the city marshal in Nauvoo, Illinois, who supervised the destruction of the press of the Nauvoo Expositor. When Joseph Smith and his brother Hyrum submitted to incarceration in Carthage, Greene was part of a group of men that accompanied them to the Carthage Jail.

After the Smiths were killed, Greene is alleged to have supported the succession claims of James Strang, but Greene died amid the succession crisis. The Church of Jesus Christ of Latter Day Saints (Strangite) alleges that Greene was "martyred by poison ... for disclosing that James Strang was appointed by Joseph Smith." However, in addition to the lack of historical evidence for the Strangite claim, Greene's support of James Strang seems inconsistent with events surrounding the succession crisis and John P. Greene's final days. John was present at the meeting on August 8th, 1844 in which Sidney Rigdon and Brigham Young addressed the Latter-day Saints regarding the future leadership of the church. John was in full agreement with the vote of those in attendance who supported his good friend and brother-in-law, Brigham Young. On August 11, 1844, John P. Greene was in attendance with Brigham Young, Heber C Kimball and other church leaders in a prayer meeting in which he was consulted about the direction the Church should take. His son Evan writes that on September 2nd, 1844, Brigham Young visited the now deathly ill John P. Greene and attended to ordinances for him. Young's diary confirms that he performed the sealing ordinances, binding John to his first wife Rhoda Young (deceased) and his second wife Mary Eliza Nelson as he was dying.

For more information, including original documents, please see JosephSmithPapers.org
