= John C. Bennett =

American physician

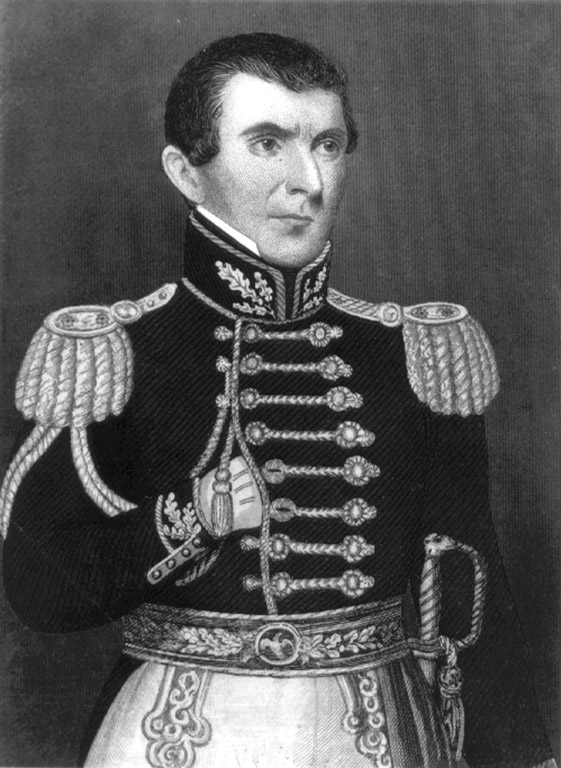
- Engraving of John C. Bennett as Major General of the Nauvoo Legion (in a hand-in-waistcoat pose)

Assistant President of the Church
- April 8, 1841 – May 11, 1842
- Called by: Joseph Smith
- End reason: Excommunicated and removed from position

1st Mayor of Nauvoo, Illinois

In office
- February 1, 1841 – May 17, 1842
- Successor: Joseph Smith

Personal details
- Born: John Cook Bennett; August 4, 1804; Fairhaven, Massachusetts, United States
- Died: August 5, 1867 (aged 63); Polk City, Iowa, United States
- Resting place: Polk City Cemetery; 41.773°N 93.702°W
- Spouse(s): Mary A. Barker (m. 1826; div. 1842); Sarah Rider (m. 1843)
- Children: 3, Mary A. Bennett, Joseph Barker Bennett, and George G. Bennett
- Parents: John Bennett; Abigail Cook
- Signature
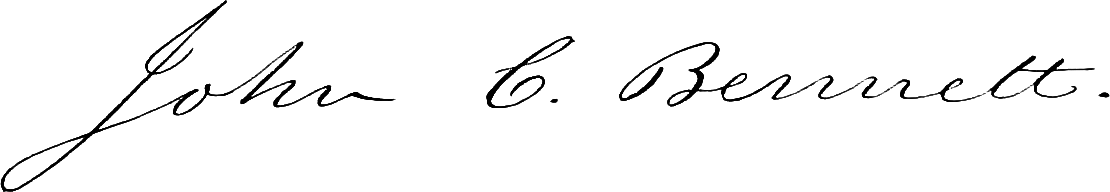

John Cook Bennett (August 4, 1804 – August 5, 1867) was an American physician and briefly a ranking and influential leader of the Latter Day Saint movement, who acted as mayor of Nauvoo, Illinois, and Major-General of the Nauvoo Legion in the early 1840s.

== Early life ==
John Cook Bennett was born on August 4, 1804, in Fairhaven, Massachusetts. He married Mary A. Barker. He worked as a physician in Ohio and helped found Willoughby Medical College.

== Early Latter-day Saint ==
Bennett's involvement in the Latter Day Saint movement came after several encounters with the community that had left him impressed. He wrote several letters to Joseph Smith in Nauvoo, Illinois, in which he declared his desire to join the Church of Jesus Christ of Latter Day Saints. He was baptized into the church in September 1840. Prior to his baptism, he had expressed his intentions to join the growing body of Latter Day Saints in Nauvoo. His wife, Mary Barker, and their children did not accompany him.

Bennett was essential to the passing of the Nauvoo city charter, the provisions of which he had helped craft, in the Illinois Legislature. He even garnered praise for his lobbying efforts from the young Abraham Lincoln.

His efforts on behalf of the Mormons and the long time he spent living in Joseph Smith's log cabin "Homestead" in Nauvoo secured Bennett the confidence of Smith. Smith was instrumental in promoting Bennett to greater civic and ecclesiastical responsibilities in Nauvoo. Bennett became a Counselor in the First Presidency, according (Times and Seasons, Vol. II., No.12, page 387) on 7 Nov. 1841, as "Assistant President, until President Rigdon's health should be restored," and the mayor of Nauvoo, General of the Nauvoo Legion, and the chancellor of University of Nauvoo.

== Leaving the Latter-day Saints ==
Bennett left the church for adultery on May 11, 1842. Rumors of adultery, homosexuality, and unauthorized polygamy emerged. Contemporary sources indicate that Bennett used his trusted position as a doctor to allay fears of women he attempted to seduce by telling them that he could cause abortions by administering medicine if they became pregnant. While Bennett was mayor, he was caught in private sexual relations with women in the city. He told the women that the practice, which he termed "spiritual wifery", was sanctioned by God and Smith and that Smith did the same. When discovered, he privately confessed his crimes, produced an affidavit that Smith had no part in his adultery, and was disciplined accordingly.

== Later life ==
After Bennett left Nauvoo in May 1842, he claimed he had been the target of an attempted assassination by Nauvoo Danites, who were disguised as women. In July 1842, he wrote a series of letters to The Sangamo Journal, accusing Smith of conspiring to assassinate former Missouri Governor Boggs.

In late 1842, Bennett published History of the Saints: Or, An Exposé of Joe Smith and Mormonism, accusing Smith and his church of crimes including treason, conspiracy to commit murder, prostitution, and adultery, with a preface that begins: "I have been induced to prepare and publish the following work by a desire to expose the enormous iniquities which have perpetrated by one of the grossest and most infamous impostors that ever appeared upon the face of the earth, and by many of his minions, under the name and garb of Religion, and professedly by the direct will and command of Almighty God." Through his newspaper writings and book, Bennett appeared to encourage Missouri's June 1843 attempt to extradite Smith to stand trial for treason. Ironically, Smith narrowly escaped extradition by virtue of the powerful Nauvoo charter for which Bennett had been a principal author.

In the fall of 1843, Bennett visited George M. Hinkle, a Mormon who was excommunicated after surrendering Smith to the Missouri Militia in 1838. Bennett's subsequent letter to the editor of the Hawk-Eye and Iowa Patriot describing the Mormon "Doctrine of Marrying for Eternity" is the first of his writings that discusses eternal marriage, as compared to the free love/spiritual wife doctrine he previously accused Smith of practicing, in which sexual relations were not in the context of committed marriage. It is unclear whether Bennett learned of eternal marriage from Hinkle or from correspondents inside Nauvoo.

Bennett briefly returned to Nauvoo in December 1843, but the sole record of that visit is a notation in Smith's daybook from his general store showing a payment of the rent Bennett owed for the 39 weeks he lived in the Mansion House in 1840 to 1841. After December 1843, Bennett is recorded to have lectured only once more against Mormonism during Smith's life in Boston during the spring of 1844. At the 1844 Boston lecture, Bennett was not well received: he was pelted with rotten eggs and chased through Boston by the "vast assemblage", which ran over several Boston police officers in the process.

After Smith was killed by a mob in Carthage, Illinois, on June 27, 1844, Bennett surprised many by returning briefly to Mormonism and joining forces first with Sidney Rigdon and then with James Strang, two of several Mormons contending for leadership of the movement. Bennett united with the "Strangites", who founded their own Mormon community on Beaver Island in Michigan. While there, he founded a short-lived Halcyon Order of the Illuminati to reinforce Strang's power over his kingdom. With Bennett's enthusiastic support, polygamy was introduced into the Michigan Mormon community (this led to the dissent of anti-polygamists from Strang's faction & was a contributing factor leading to Strang's assassination). Shortly thereafter, in 1847, amid more charges of sexual misconduct, Bennett was excommunicated from the Strangite community. Bennett did not associate with any Latter Day Saint group for the remainder of his life.

Bennett has been accused of having a part in Smith's murder, but, as his biographer Andrew F. Smith (no relation to Joseph Smith) states, based on the extant evidence, "Bennett appears to have had no influence on the events that unfolded in Carthage during June 1844."

Bennett is often credited with introducing into Mormonism the term "spiritual wifery", the term he used for both his own practice of "free love" and for the Nauvoo practice of "plural marriage". The term was occasionally used by Mormon leaders such as Brigham Young, who spoke of the shock he received when introduced by Smith to "the spiritual wife doctrine", referring to "plural marriage". One of Bennett's legacies was the conflation of "plural marriage" with "free love" in the popular imagination. The term "spiritual wifery", with its mixed connotations of polygyny and promiscuity, was frequently used in the national dialogue and in activism against Mormon polygamy.

== Legacy ==
Bennett's troubled relationship with the Mormons has overshadowed his other notable activities, including commanding a company for the Union in the American Civil War. Beginning in 1835, Bennett was an early champion of the health benefits of the tomato; a pioneer in the use of chloroform as an anesthetic, publishing his findings in 1848; and the creator of several breeds of chicken, including Plymouth Rock fowl, which he exhibited in Boston in 1849. From 1830 to 1846, Bennett worked to establish institutions of higher learning, many of which were medical colleges. Bennett's practice of "selling diplomas" clouds that achievement, and only one educational institution survived Bennett's connection with it.

Bennett left behind an extensive body of letters and published works on his various endeavors, including two books, History of the Saints and The Poultry Book. Bennett died in 1868 in Polk City, Iowa.

== Notes ==
Political offices
First	Mayor of Nauvoo, Illinois; February 1, 1841–May 17, 1842	Succeeded by Joseph Smith
Church of Jesus Christ of Latter Day Saints titles
Preceded by Hyrum Smith	Assistant President of the Church; April 8, 1841–May 11, 1842; With: Hyrum Smith	Office Discontinued (after Hyrum Smith's death in 1844)
