= William Law (Latter Day Saints) =

American religious leader

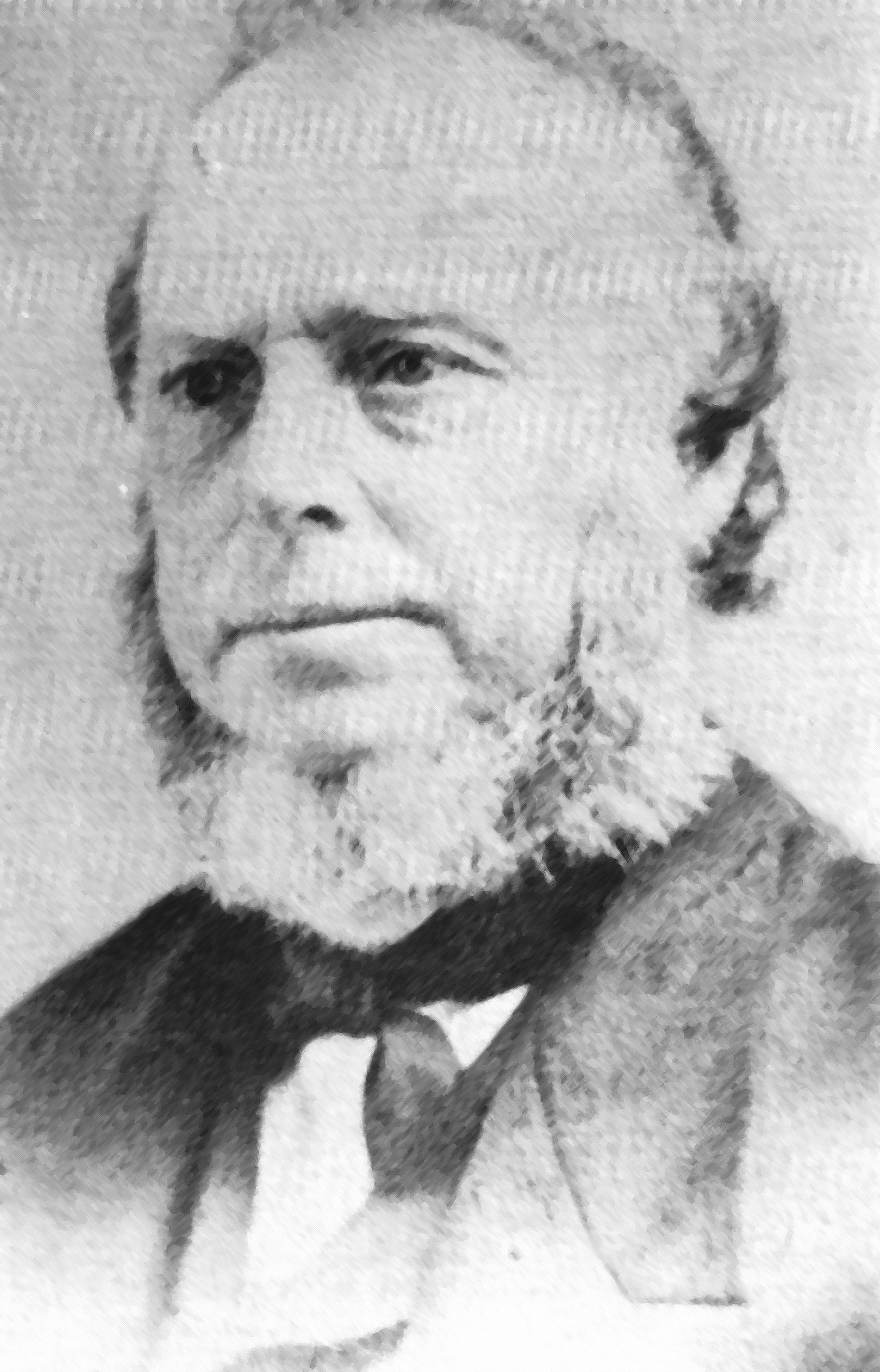

Second Counselor in the First Presidency
- January 24, 1841 – April 18, 1844
- Called by: Joseph Smith
- Predecessor: Hyrum Smith
- Successor: Disputed, possibly: Willard Richards; David H. Smith
- End reason: Excommunicated for apostasy

Personal details
- Born: September 8, 1809; County Tyrone, Ireland, United Kingdom
- Died: January 19, 1892 (aged 87); Shullsburg, Wisconsin, United States
- Resting place: Evergreen Cemetery; 42.5686°N 90.2289°W
- Spouse(s): Jane Silverthorn
- Children: 8
- Parents: Richard Law; Ann Hunter

William Law (September 8, 1809 – January 19, 1892) was an important figure in the early history of the Latter Day Saint movement, holding a position in the church's First Presidency under Joseph Smith Jr. Law was later excommunicated for apostasy from the church and was founder of the short-lived True Church of Jesus Christ of Latter Day Saints. In this capacity, he published a single edition of the Nauvoo Expositor, the destruction of which set in motion a chain of events that eventually led to Smith's death.

== Biography ==
Law was born in County Tyrone, Ireland, to Richard Law and Ann Hunter as the youngest of five children. His older brother was Wilson Law. The Law family moved to the United States around 1820. Law eventually ended up in Churchville, Upper Canada, and at the age of 24 married Jane Silverthorn, who was 19 years old. Law and Silverthorn had eight children: two daughters and six sons.

=== Church activity ===
Law and his wife joined the Church of Christ in 1836 in Canada, through the proselyting efforts of John Taylor and Almon W. Babbitt. In 1839, Law led a group of Canadian saints to Nauvoo, Illinois, and in 1841, Joseph Smith chose him to be a member of the First Presidency. He was also a member of the Nauvoo city council.

Over time, Law became troubled by certain practices of Smith. He felt Smith was confusing church and state roles in Nauvoo, by evading extradition to be tried for crimes in Missouri. He also thought Smith used his church authority to sway political outcomes. However, it was Smith's covert practice of polygamy (and his alleged advances towards Law's wife, Jane) that caused Law to completely separate himself. Rumors circulated that Smith had made several proposals to Jane under the premise that she would enter a polyandrous marriage with Smith. Law and his wife confirmed these rumors were partly true.

However, according to Alexander Neibaur, Jane Law had actually asked to be sealed to Smith after he had refused to seal her to William. According to the rumor, Smith had denied the couple because William was guilty of adultery (William had confessed his actions to Smith), though he did not tell Jane his reasons. In committing the sin, Law felt like he had transgressed against his own soul.

Years later, according to Ann Eliza Young (nineteenth wife of Brigham Young and later a critic of polygamy and Mormonism), Jane stated Smith visited her at night. He knew Law would not be home and proposed to her, suggesting it was God's will that she enter into a polyandrous marriage with him. Young's account states that Jane Law stated that Smith had "asked her to give him half her love; she was at liberty to keep the other half for her husband." She refused Smith's request to marry him as a polyandrous plural wife. In contrast to her claim, Smith stated Jane had "thrown her arms around his neck" and requested to be sealed to Smith if she could not be sealed to William Law. Smith turned down the request. Law still believed Mormonism was true, but he viewed Smith as a fallen prophet.

=== Nauvoo Expositor Incident ===
On January 8, 1844, Law was informed he was no longer a counselor to Smith in the First Presidency. He was shocked and frustrated. He demanded a rehearing of his case, because the procedures for removal from the First Presidency had not been followed. The rehearing was granted and on April 18, 1844, he was tried again. However, this time he was tried as if he were a private member and not a high-ranking church official. Once again he felt this went against church protocol. The following day he was informed of his excommunication on grounds of apostasy. At this point, he felt Smith was beyond saving, and that it was his duty to expose him to the rest of the Mormon community.

Law met privately after his excommunication with other opponents of Smith and formed a group. Shortly thereafter, Law created the True Church of Jesus Christ of Latter Day Saints and became its President. On June 7, 1844, Law and his followers published the Nauvoo Expositor, a newspaper that outlined Law's contentions against Smith, including the then-secret practice of plural marriage. The reaction to the newspaper was not what Law expected, and after two days of consultation, the printing press was ordered destroyed by Smith and the Nauvoo city council. It was destroyed later that day.

Smith was later arrested and taken to nearby Carthage, Illinois, on charges relating to the destruction of the Expositor. On June 27, 1844, Smith was killed by a mob.

For many years, Law was accused of being a member or a leader of the mob that killed Smith. Law denied that he was in Carthage, and stated in his diary that he had been there earlier in the day.

Law expressed outrage and remorse at Smith's death in his private journal.

=== Later life ===
Law's opinion was that Smith's goal "to demoralize the world, to give it to Satan, his master..... He claimed to be a god, whereas he was only a servant of the Devil, and as such he met his fate."

In 1887, Law agreed to be interviewed reflecting on his experience with Mormonism. This interview, along with three letters by Law, were published in the Salt Lake Tribune.

William Law died in 1892 at the age of 82 in Shullsburg, Lafayette County, Wisconsin. His later years were marked by a return to private life, distancing himself from the religious controversies that had once defined his public persona.

Church of Jesus Christ of Latter Day Saints titles
Preceded by Hyrum Smith	Second Counselor in the First Presidency; January 24, 1841 – April 18, 1844	Succeeded by Disputed: Possible successors include: Willard Richards (LDS Church); David H. Smith (RLDS Church)
