= Outline of Joseph Smith =

Founder of the Latter Day Saint movement (1805–1844)

The following outline is provided as an overview of and topical guide to the life and influence of Joseph Smith:

Joseph Smith (1805 – 1844) – central figure of Mormonism, whom the teachings of most sects in the Latter Day Saint movement hold to be the founding Prophet.

== Taxonomy of Joseph Smith ==
- Religion
    - Monotheism – belief that only one God exists
      - Abrahamic Religions – religions Abraham is a direct prophet
        - Christianity – monotheistic religion Jesus is the founder
          - latter day saints – the teachings of Jesus needed to be restored because all existing churches fell into a Great Apostasy.
            - Joseph Smith is the Prophet who restored many lost teachings of Jesus through Revelations.

== Life of Joseph Smith ==
=== Early life ===
- Early life of Joseph Smith
  - Place of birth Sharon, Vermont
  - Parents: Lucy Mack Smith, Joseph Smith, Sr.
  - Palmyra
  - Smith Family Farm
  - Second Great Awakening
  - Burned-over district
  - Sacred Grove (Latter Day Saints)
  - First Vision
  - Angel Moroni
  - Golden Plates
  - Urim and Thummim (Latter Day Saints)
  - Hill Cumorah
  - Alvin Smith (brother of Joseph Smith)
  - Seer stones (Latter Day Saints)
  - Joseph Smith and the criminal justice system
  - Emma Smith - first wife
  - reformed Egyptian

=== 1827 to 1830 ===
- Life of Joseph Smith from 1827 to 1830
  - Martin Harris (Latter Day Saints)
  - Anthon transcript
  - Charles Anthon
  - Lost 116 pages
  - Oliver Cowdery
  - Book of Mosiah
  - Fayette, New York
  - Peter Whitmer
  - David Whitmer
  - Three Witnesses
  - Eight Witnesses
  - Book of Mormon
  - Church of Christ
  - Confirmation (Latter Day Saints)
  - Melchizedek priesthood
  - Hiram Page
  - New Jerusalem
  - Sidney Rigdon
  - Stake (Latter Day Saints)

=== 1831 to 1837 ===
- Life of Joseph Smith from 1831 to 1837
  - United Order
  - Elder (Latter Day Saints)
  - General conference (Latter Day Saints)
  - Melchizedek priesthood (Latter Day Saints)
  - Zion (Latter Day Saints)
  - Zion's Camp
  - First Presidency
  - Apostle (Latter Day Saints)
  - Seventy (Latter Day Saints)
  - Presiding high council
  - Kirtland Temple
  - Fanny Alger
  - Kirtland Safety Society

=== 1838 to 1839 ===
- Life of Joseph Smith from 1838 to 1839
  - 1838 Mormon War
  - Anti-Mormonism
  - Sampson Avard
  - Danites
  - Salt Sermon
  - Rigdon's July 4th oration
  - Thomas B. Marsh
  - Orson Hyde
  - Battle of Crooked River
  - Lilburn Boggs
  - Missouri Executive Order 44
  - Haun's Mill massacre
  - Liberty Jail
  - Brigham Young

=== 1839 to 1844 ===
- Life of Joseph Smith from 1839 to 1844
  - Nauvoo Legion
  - John C. Bennett
  - Nauvoo, Illinois
  - Assistant President of the Church
  - plural marriage
  - baptism for the dead
  - Nauvoo Temple
  - Endowment (Mormonism)
  - Relief Society
  - Porter Rockwell
  - Thomas Ford
  - Anointed Quorum

=== Death ===
- Death of Joseph Smith
  - William Law
  - Nauvoo House
  - True Church of Jesus Christ of Latter Day Saints
  - Nauvoo Expositor
  - King Follett discourse
  - Thomas C. Sharp
  - Warsaw Signal
  - Hyrum Smith
  - John Taylor
  - Willard Richards
  - John P. Greene
  - Dan Jones
  - John S. Fullmer
  - Carthage Jail
  - Smith Family Cemetery

== Legacy ==
=== People ===
- Mormons
- ex-Mormons

=== Memorials ===
- Joseph Smith Memorial Building
- Joseph Smith Building
- Joseph Smith Birthplace Memorial

=== Churches ===
- Succession crisis (Latter Day Saints)
- List of sects in the Latter Day Saint movement
  - patrilineal succession
  - Samuel H. Smith (Latter Day Saints)
  - William Smith (Latter Day Saints)
  - Joseph Smith III
  - David Hyrum Smith
- The Church of Jesus Christ of Latter-day Saints
  - Brigham Young
  - Utah Territory
- Church of Jesus Christ (Bickertonite)
  - Rigdonite
  - Sidney Rigdon
- Church of Jesus Christ of Latter Day Saints (Strangite)
  - Letter of Appointment
  - James J. Strang
- Community of Christ
  - Joseph Smith III

== Teachings ==
- Teachings of Joseph Smith

=== Salvation ===
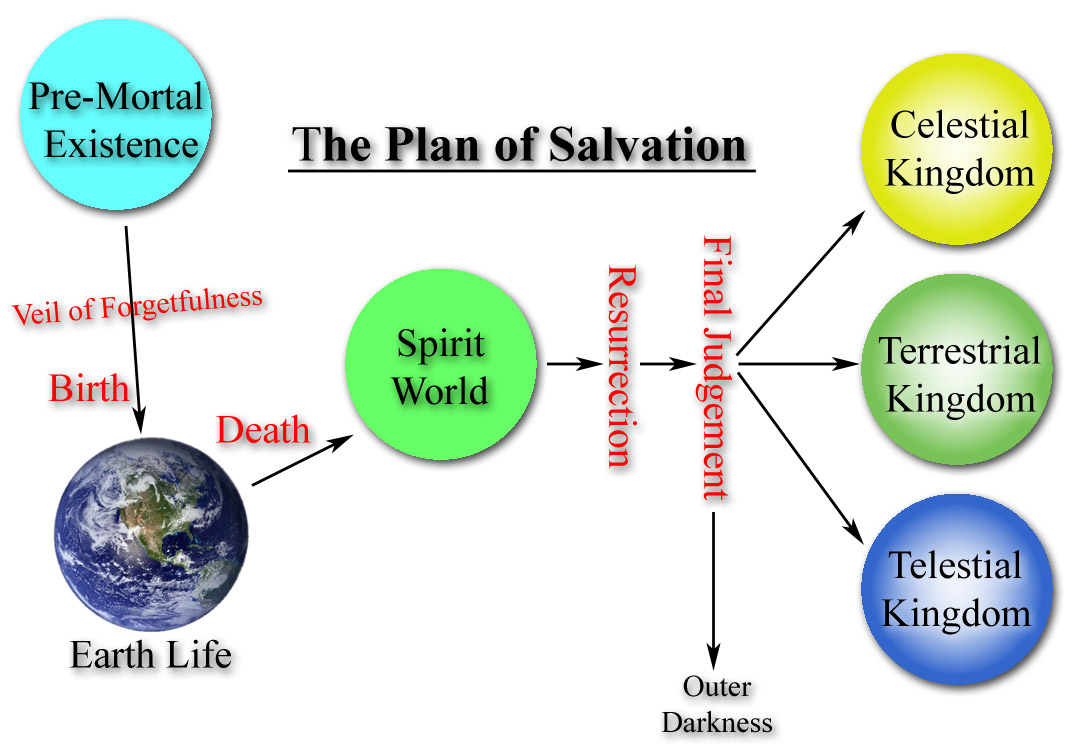
Plan of Salvation

- Mormon cosmology
- Godhead (Latter Day Saints)
- Ordinance (Latter Day Saints)
- degree of glory

=== Temple ===
- Freemasonry and the Latter Day Saint movement
- Endowment (Latter Day Saints)
- Endowment (Mormonism)
- sealing
- Celestial marriage
- Exaltation (Mormonism)

=== Church organization ===
- Church of Christ
- Restoration (Latter Day Saints)
- Great Apostasy
- Council of Fifty
- Article of Faith

=== Priesthood ===
- Priesthood (Latter Day Saints)
- Melchizedek priesthood (Latter Day Saints)
- Aaronic priesthood (LDS Church)
- Patriarchal priesthood

=== Polygamy ===
- Origin of Latter Day Saint polygamy
- Mormonism and polygamy
- Louisa Beaman

=== Prophecies ===
- List of prophecies of Joseph Smith

== Revealed Scriptures ==
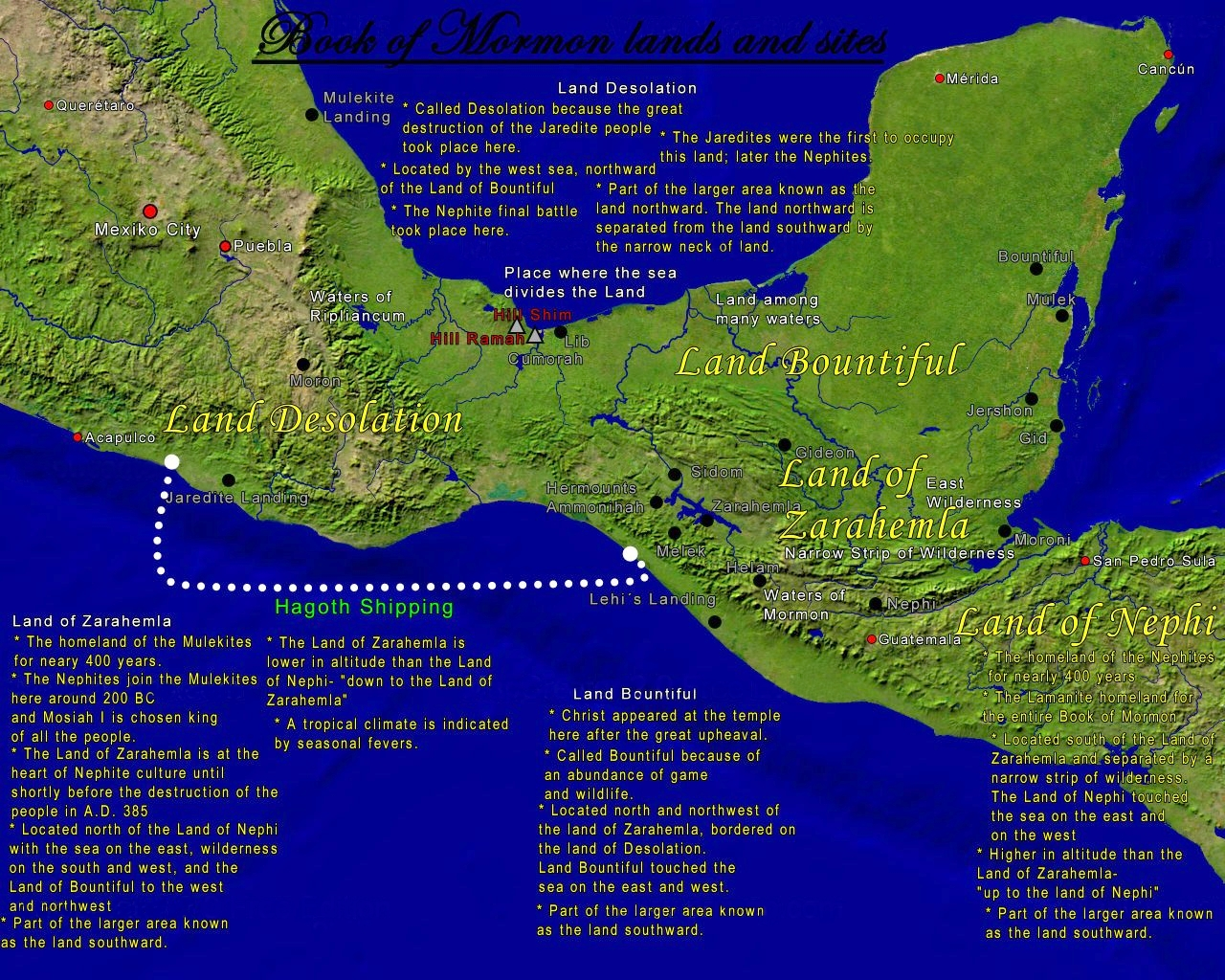
Proposed map of the lands and sites of the Book of Mormon

- Book of Mormon
- Doctrine and Covenants
- Pearl of Great Price
  - Book of Moses
  - Book of Abraham
  - Joseph Smith–Matthew
  - Joseph Smith–History
  - Articles of Faith
- Inspired Version of the Bible

=== Other texts ===
- Lectures on Faith
- King Follett discourse

== Parents and siblings ==
- Smith family (Latter Day Saints)
- Joseph Smith, Sr.
- Lucy Mack Smith
- Alvin Smith
- Hyrum Smith
- Samuel H. Smith
- William Smith
- Katharine Smith Salisbury
- Don Carlos Smith
- List of descendants of Joseph Smith, Sr. and Lucy Mack Smith

== Related Church Presidents ==
- Community of Christ
  - Joseph Smith III
  - Frederick M. Smith
  - Israel A. Smith
  - W. Wallace Smith
  - Wallace B. Smith
- Remnant Church of Jesus Christ of Latter Day Saints
  - Frederick Niels Larsen

== Family chart ==
The inter-relationship of the offices of President of the Church (also known as "Prophet-President") and Presiding Patriarch (also known a Presiding Evangelist) in the Smith family, and the doctrine of Lineal succession, of pre and post-reorganization in the Community of Christ:

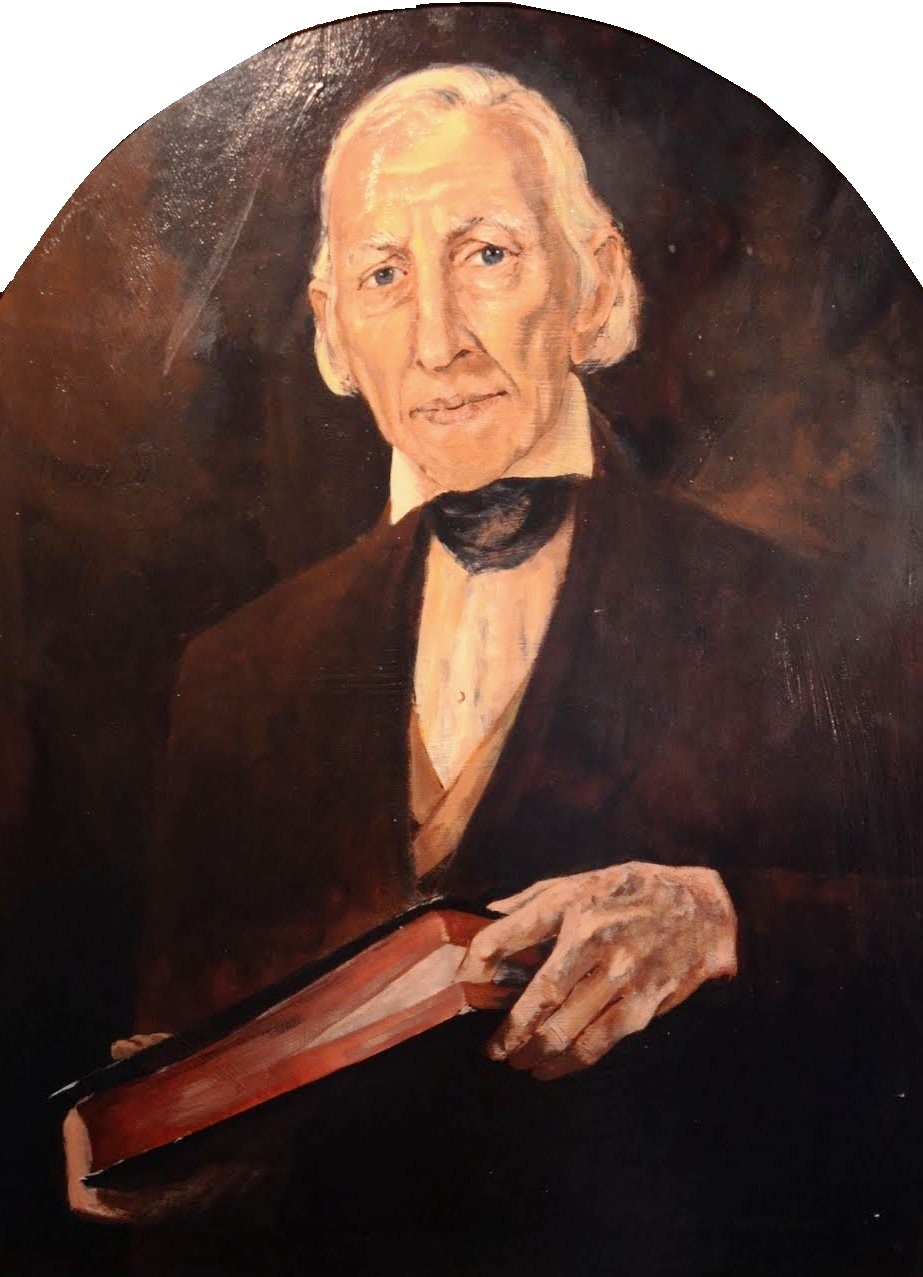
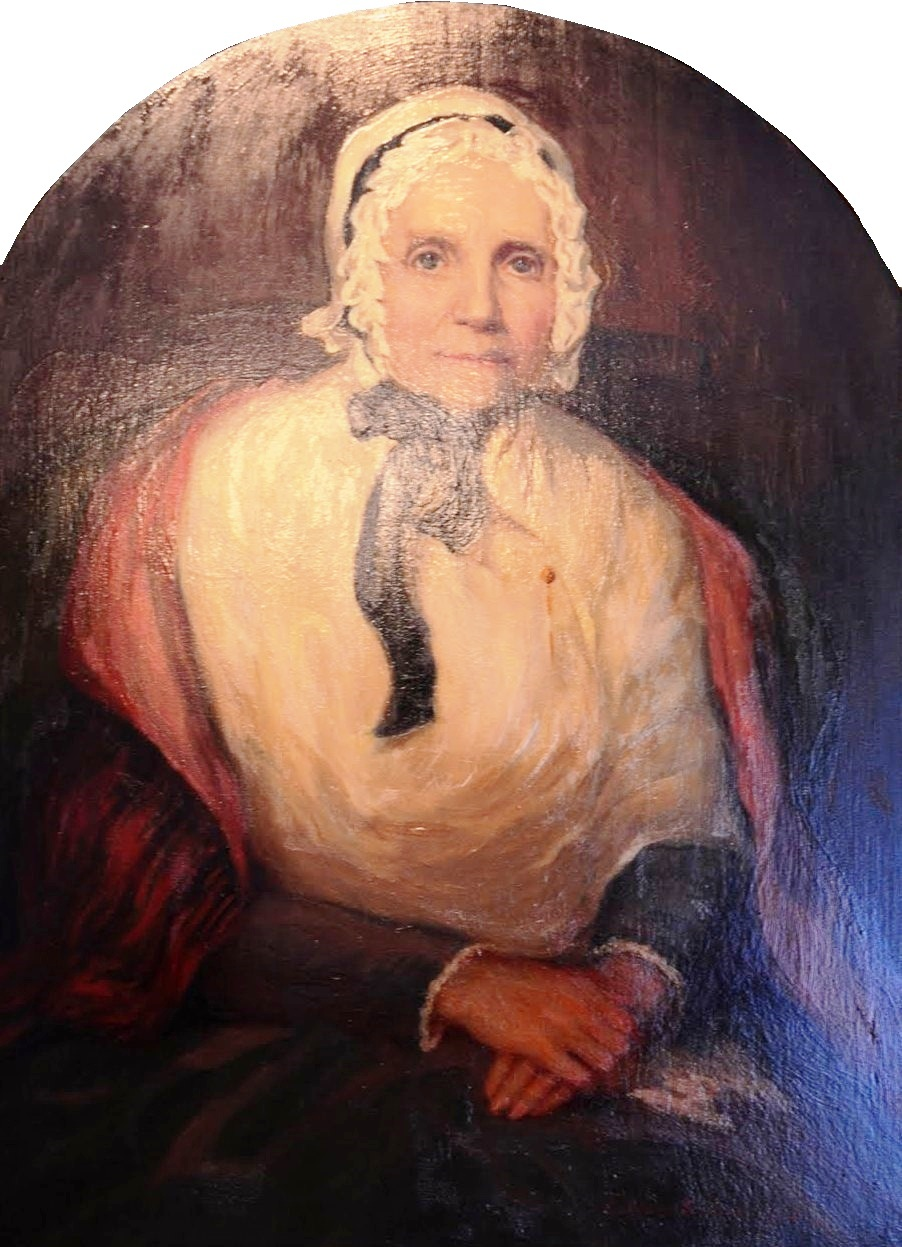
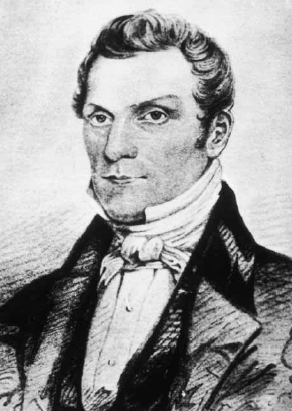
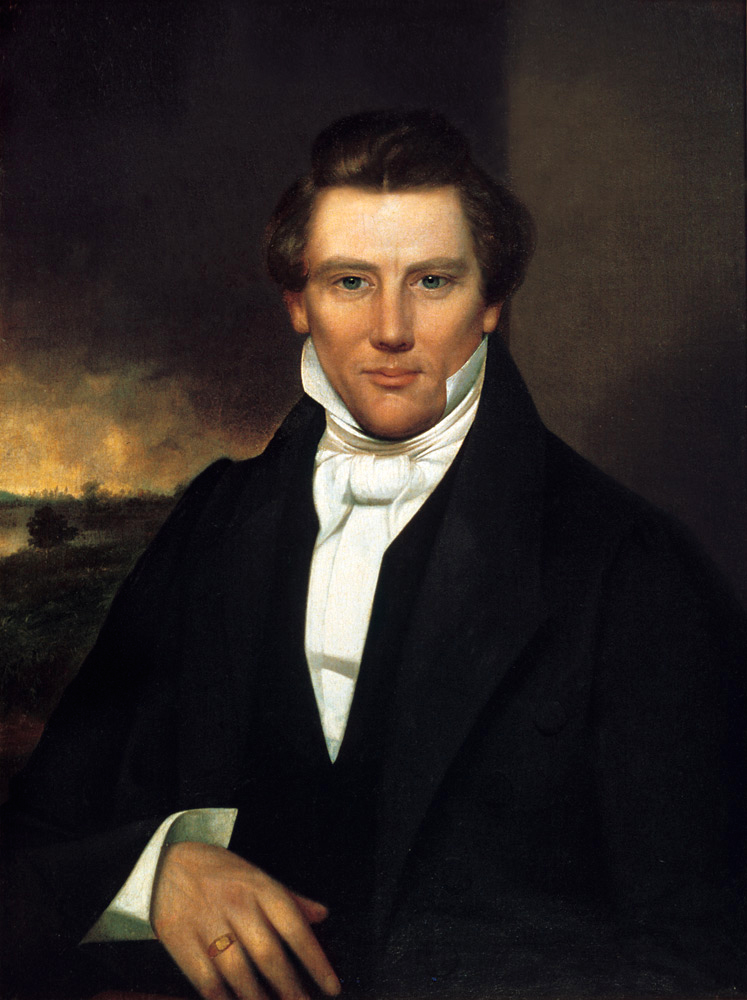
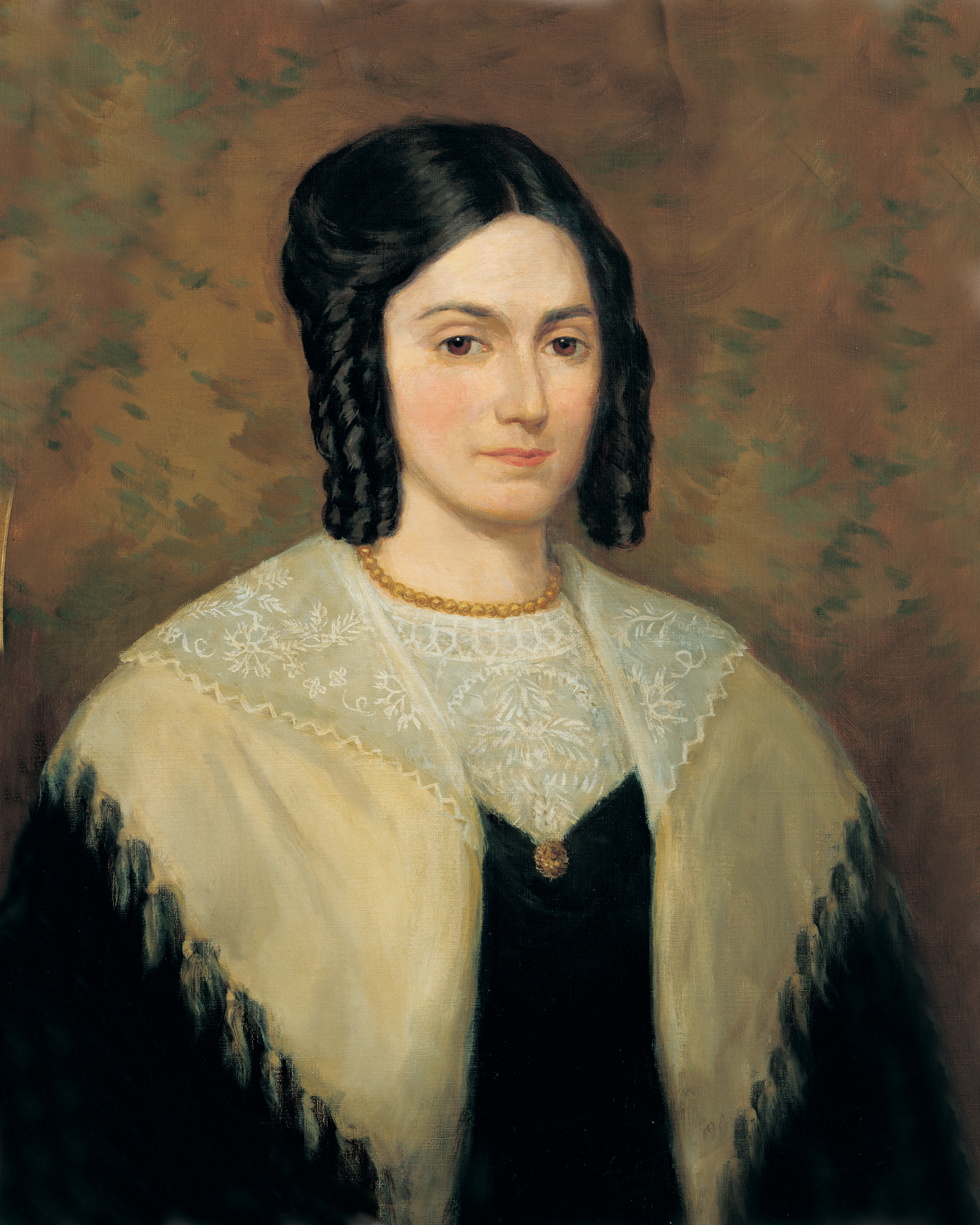
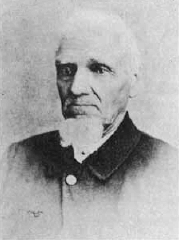
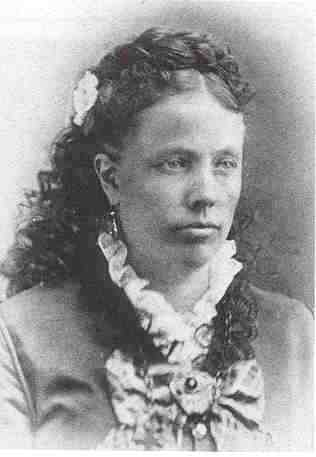
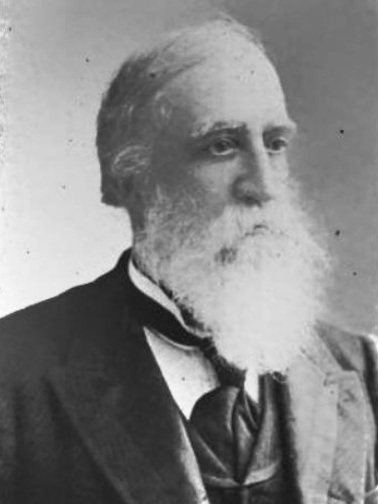
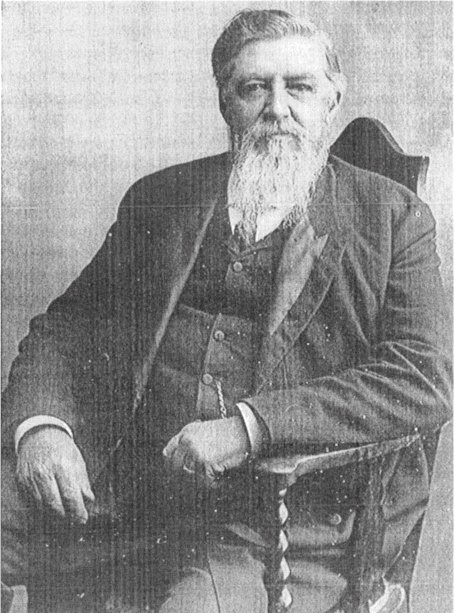
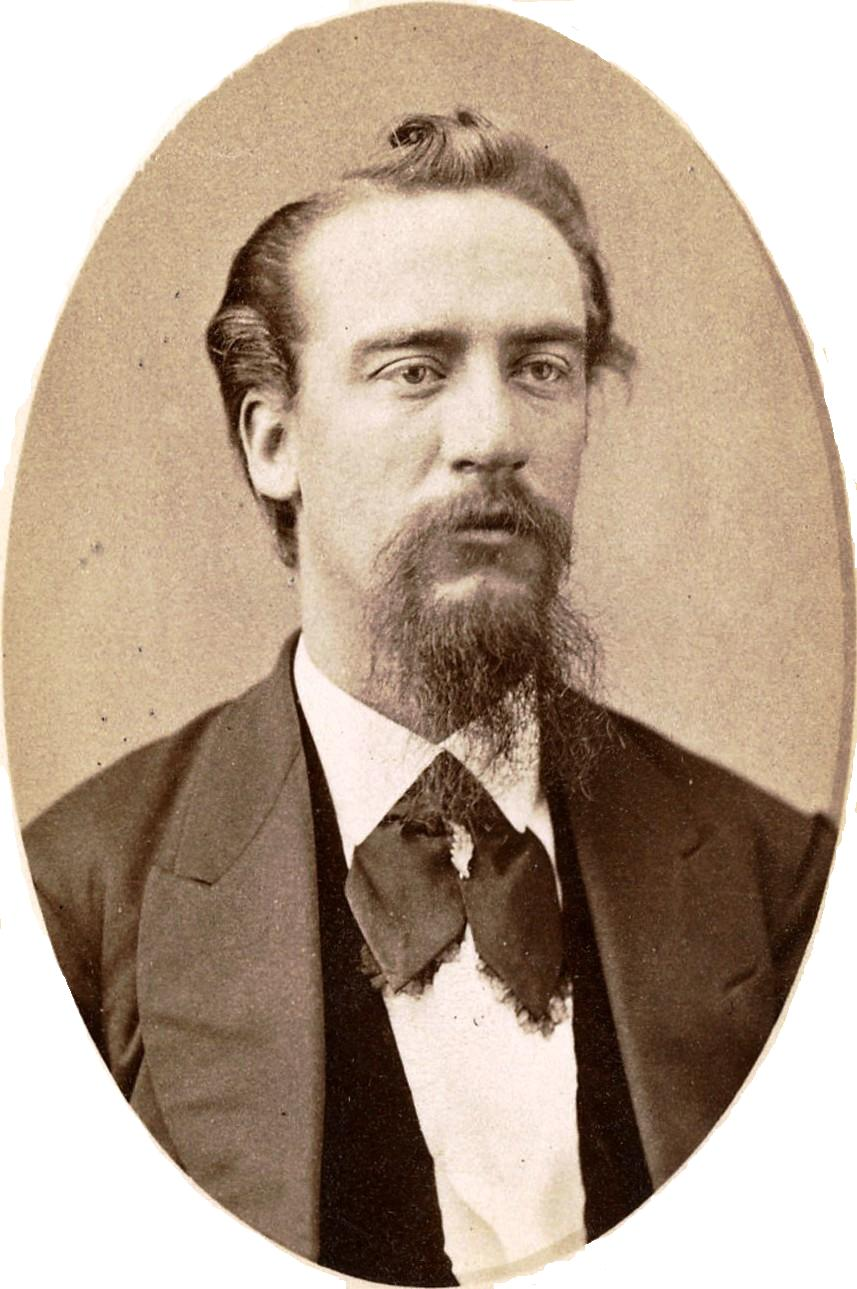
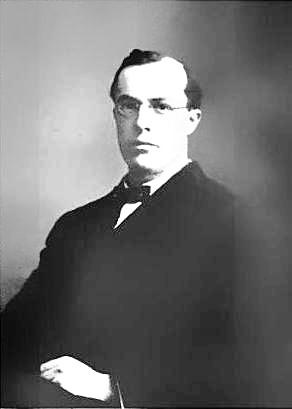
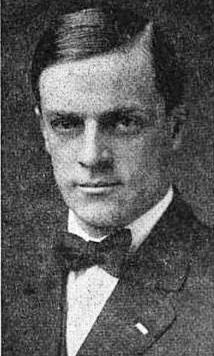
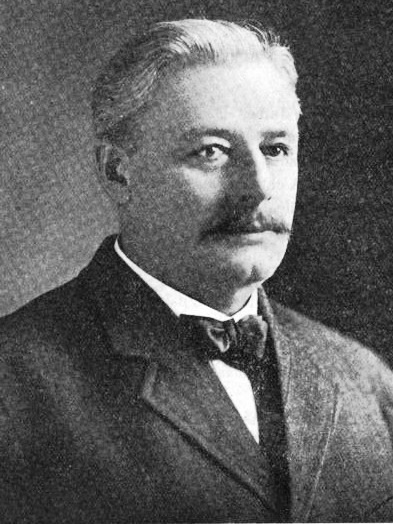
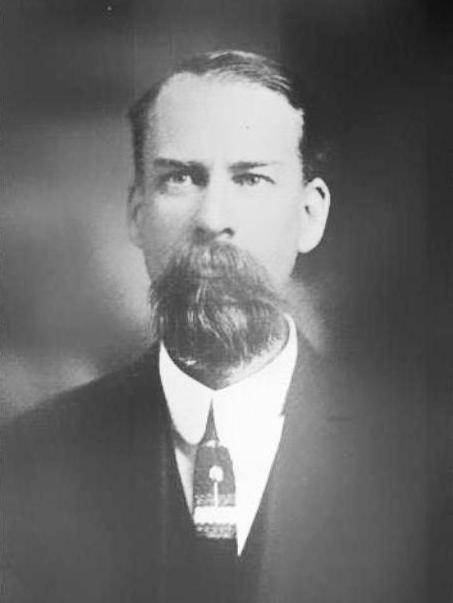
Joseph Smith, Sr. 1771–1840; Presiding Patriarch (1833–1840)	Lucy Mack Smith; 1776–1856
Hyrum Smith; 1800–1844; Presiding Patriarch (1841–1844)	Joseph Smith, Jr. 1805–1844; President of the Church (1830–1844)	Emma Hale Smith; 1804–1879; Elect Lady	William B. Smith; 1811–1893; Presiding Patriarch (1845)
Bertha Madison; 1843–1896	Joseph Smith III; 1832–1914; Prophet-President (1860–1914)	Ada Clark; 1871–1914	Alexander Hale Smith; 1838–1909; Presiding Patriarch (1897–1902)	David Hyrum Smith; 1844–1904
Frederick M. Smith; 1874–1946; Prophet–President (1914–1946)	Israel A. Smith; 1876–1958; Prophet–President (1946–1958)	W. Wallace Smith; 1900–1989; Prophet–President (1958–1978)	Frederick A. Smith; 1862–1954; Presiding Patriarch (1913–1938)	Elbert A. Smith; 1871–1959; Presiding Patriarch (1938–1958)

== Family and descendants ==
- List of the wives of Joseph Smith
- Children of Joseph Smith
- Presiding Patriarch

== Latter Day Saints in popular culture ==
Main article
Latter Day Saints in popular culture
Depictions
The 19th Wife
A Victim of the Mormons
Advise and Consent
All About Mormons
America (short story)
Angels in America (miniseries)
Around the World in Eighty Days
Bad Bascomb (film)
Bash: Latter-Day Plays
Be Happy Be Mormon
Ben Banks (film)
The Big Gundown
Big Love
The Book of Mormon (musical)
The Book of Mormon: Original Broadway Cast Recording
Burying the Past
Cannibal! The Musical
The Cremaster Cycle
Darger family
Doom novels
The Duchess and the Dirtwater Fox
Escape (Jessop and Palmer book)
The Folk of the Fringe
The Fringe (short story)
Georgia Rule
The Girl from Utah
The Great Brain
Latter Days
Lost Boys (novel)
Married to a Mormon
Messenger of Death
Millions (2004 film)
The Monkey Wrench Gang
More New Arabian Nights: The Dynamiter
The Mormons (miniseries)
Mountain Meadows massacre and the media
New York Doll
Orgazmo
The Other Side of Heaven
Pageant Wagon (short story)
Paint Your Wagon (film)
Paint Your Wagon (musical)
The Parafaith War
Polygamy, USA
Probably (South Park)
The Prophet, the Gold and the Transylvanians
Riders of the Purple Sage
Roughing It
Salvage (short story)
Secrets of a Gay Mormon Felon
September Dawn
Settling Accounts: Return Engagement
Settling Accounts: The Grapple
Sister Wives
Stolen Innocence
The Strangers (2008 film)
A Study in Scarlet
They Call Me Trinity
Trapped by the Mormons
Under the Banner of Heaven
Wagon Master
West (short story)
Documentaries
Get the Fire
Meet the Mormons
The Mountain Meadows Massacre (film)
Presidents and Prophets

== Important places ==
- Joseph Smith Birthplace Memorial
- Palmyra (town), New York
- Smith Family Farm
- Sacred Grove (Latter Day Saints)
- Cumorah
- Aaronic Priesthood Restoration Site
- Peter Whitmer log home
- Book of Mormon Historic Publication Site
- John Johnson Farm
- Zion (Latter Day Saints)
- Kirtland, Ohio
- Historic Kirtland Village
- Kirtland Temple
- Zion's Camp
- Jackson County, Missouri
- Independence, Missouri
- Far West, Missouri
- Adam-ondi-Ahman
- 1838 Mormon War
- Liberty Jail
- Nauvoo, Illinois
- History of Nauvoo, Illinois
- Nauvoo Historic District
- Joseph Smith Mansion House
- Nauvoo House
- Red Brick Store
- Nauvoo Temple
- Carthage Jail
- Smith Family Cemetery

== Works about him ==
- Works relating to Joseph Smith
- History of the Church
- History of Joseph Smith by His Mother
- Teachings of the Prophet Joseph Smith
- No Man Knows My History
- Joseph Smith: The Making of a Prophet
- An Insider's View of Mormon Origins
- Joseph Smith: Rough Stone Rolling
- The Joseph Smith Papers

== See also ==
- Index of articles related to the Church of Jesus Christ of Latter-day Saints
- Outline of the Church of Jesus Christ of Latter-day Saints
- Outline of the Book of Mormon
