= Andrew Weiner (writer) =

Canadian writer (1949–2019)

- Born: 17 June 1949; London, England, UK
- Died: 3 December 2019 (aged 70); Toronto, Ontario, Canada
- Occupation: Novelist
- Writing career
- Genre: Science fiction
- Notable work: Station Gehenna

Andrew Weiner (17 June 1949 – 3 December 2019) was a Canadian science fiction writer. He published three novels and over forty short stories.

Weiner was born in London, United Kingdom, where he graduated in social psychology from the London School of Economics. He emigrated to Canada in 1974.

== Bibliography ==
=== Novels ===
- Station Gehenna (1987)
- Getting Near the End (2004, first publication in French under the title En approchant de la fin, 2000)
- Among the Missing (2006, only published in French, under the title Boulevard des disparus)

=== Short story collections ===
- Distant Signals: And Other Stories (1989)
- This is the Year Zero (1998)

=== Anthologized short stories ===
His short story "Empire of the Sun"—his first professional sale—was included in Again, Dangerous Visions (1972) edited by Harlan Ellison, and his "Klein's Machine" appeared in Future on Ice (1998) edited by Orson Scott Card.
