= Future on Fire =

1991 science fiction anthology

- First edition
- Editor: Orson Scott Card
- Cover artist: Ron Walotsky
- Language: English
- Genre: Science fiction
- Publisher: Tor Books
- Publication date: 1991
- Publication place: United States
- Media type: Print (paperback)
- Pages: 384
- ISBN: 0-8125-1183-2
- OCLC: 23011370
- Followed by: Future on Ice

Future on Fire (1991) is a science fiction anthology edited by American writer Orson Scott Card. It contains fifteen stories written in the 1980s by different writers.

== Story list ==
The stories in this book are:

- "Rachel in Love" (1987) novelette by Pat Murphy
- "Dogfight" (1985) novelette by William Gibson and Michael Swanwick
- "A Gift from the GrayLanders" (1985) novelette by Michael Bishop
- "Fire Zone Emerald" (1986) novelette by Lucius Shepard
- "Down and Out in the Year 2000" (1986) short story by Kim Stanley Robinson
- "Angel Baby" (1982) novelette by Rachel Pollack
- "The Neighbor's Wife" (1985) poem by Susan Palwick
- "I Am the Burning Bush" (1982) short story by Gregg Keizer
- "Pretty Boy Crossover" (1986) short story by Pat Cadigan
- "Buffalo Gals, Won't You Come Out Tonight" (1987) novelette by Ursula K. Le Guin
- "All My Darling Daughters" (1985) novelette by Connie Willis
- "In the Realm of the Heart, in the World of the Knife" (1985) short story by Wayne Wightman
- "Rat" (1986) short story by James Patrick Kelly
- "Vestibular Man" (1985) novelette by Felix C. Gotschalk
- "Green Days in Brunei" (1985) novella by Bruce Sterling

== Related works ==
- Future on Ice (1998) Companion collection of 1980's stories.
