= Future on Ice =

1998 science fiction anthology

- First edition
- Editor: Orson Scott Card
- Cover artist: The Chopping Block, Inc.
- Genre: Science fiction
- Publisher: Tor Books
- Publication date: 1998
- Publication place: United States
- Media type: Print (hardback & paperback)
- Pages: 432
- ISBN: 0-312-86694-1
- Preceded by: Future on Fire

Future on Ice (1998) is a science fiction anthology edited by American writer Orson Scott Card, belated companion to Future on Fire (1991). It contains eighteen stories written in the 1980s by different writers including "The Fringe" by Card himself.

A third volume, a collection of humorous or satirical sf called Future on Hold, was contemplated by Card.

== Contents ==
Unless noted specifically, the length is short story.

- "Robot Dreams" (1986) by Isaac Asimov
- "Portraits of His Children" (1985) novelette by George R. R. Martin
- "Tourists" (1985) Lisa Goldstein
- "Blood Music" (1983) novelette by Greg Bear – 1983 Nebula Award – 1984 Hugo Award
- "Time's Rub" (1984) Gregory Benford
- "Shanidar" (1985) novelette by David Zindell
- "Speech Sounds" (1983) Octavia E. Butler
- "Snow" (1985) by John Crowley
- "Klein's Machine" (1985) by Andrew Weiner
- "Pots" (1985) novelette by C. J. Cherryh
- "Press Enter []" (1984) novella by John Varley – 1984 Nebula Award
- "Dinosaurs" (1987) novelette by Walter Jon Williams
- "Face Value" (1986) by Karen Joy Fowler
- "Cabracan" (1986) Lewis Shiner
- "Rockabye Baby" (1985) novelette by S. C. Sykes
- "The Pure Product" (1986) novelette by John Kessel
- "Out of All Them Bright Stars" (1985) Nancy Kress – 1985 Nebula Award
- "The Fringe" (1985) novelette by Orson Scott Card – 1986 Hugo Award nomination
