= Dinosaurs (short story) =

Novelette by Walter Jon Williams

Cover of the first independent publication (Pulphouse).

"Dinosaurs" is a science fiction novelette by American writer Walter Jon Williams. It was first published in Isaac Asimov's Science Fiction Magazine in June 1987 and subsequently republished in The Year's Best Science Fiction: Fifth Annual Collection (1988), The 1988 Annual World's Best SF (1988), Best New SF 2 (1988), Facets (1991), Isaac Asimov's Aliens (1991), ZomerSFeer (Dutch language, 1996), Future on Ice (1998), The Furthest Horizon: SF Adventures to the Far Future (2000), and Exploring the Horizons: Explorers, and The Furthest Horizon (2000).

Publishers Weekly described it as "bio-punk".

Williams has stated that the story is essentially about a fear of senility and senescence, applied to humanity as a whole rather than to an individual. He originally wrote the story in 1985, for a science fiction magazine that was to be published by L. Ron Hubbard; however, Hubbard died shortly after having accepted the story, and the magazine was cancelled.

== Synopsis ==
Millions of years in the future, after humanity has taken on multiple specialized forms, Ambassador Drill attempts to defuse an incipient conflict between humanity and the Shar.

== Reception ==
"Dinosaurs" was nominated for the Hugo Award for Best Novelette, the Locus Award for Best Novelette, and the Theodore Sturgeon Award.
