= Life of Joseph Smith from 1839 to 1844 =

Final years of Joseph Smith, Jr.

The life of Joseph Smith from 1839 to 1844, when he was 34–38 years old, covers the period of Smith's life when he lived in Nauvoo, an eventful and highly controversial period of the Latter Day Saint movement. In 1844, after Smith was imprisoned in Carthage, Illinois, he was shot and killed when a mob stormed the jailhouse.

== Overview ==
In April 1839, Smith rejoined his followers who, having fled east from Missouri, had spread out along the banks of the Mississippi, near Quincy, Illinois. There, for both humanitarian and political reasons, the refugees had been welcomed. Purchasing waterlogged wilderness land on credit from two Connecticut speculators (who drove a hard bargain during this period of economic recession), Smith established a new gathering place for the Saints along the Mississippi in Hancock County. He renamed the area "Nauvoo", which means "beautiful" in Hebrew. The soggy low land and river eddies were exceptional breeding grounds for mosquitoes, and the Saints suffered plagues of malaria in the summers of 1839, 1840, and 1841. (In 1841 malaria killed Joseph's brother Don Carlos and his namesake, Joseph's son Don Carlos, within a few days of one another.)

Late in 1839, Smith went to Washington to seek redress from the federal government for the Saints' losses in Missouri. He met briefly with President Martin Van Buren, but neither man seems to have thought much of the other, and the trip produced no reparations. Whatever sympathy Van Buren or Congress might have had for Mormon victims was canceled out by the importance of Missouri in the upcoming presidential election. Nevertheless, Smith shrewdly made Missouri a "byword for oppression" and "saw to it that the sufferings of his people received national publicity."

Smith sent off the Twelve Apostles to Great Britain to serve as missionaries for the new faith. All left families in desperate circumstances struggling to establish themselves in Iowa or Illinois. While Smith had been imprisoned, Brigham Young, the senior member of the Quorum of the Twelve Apostles had brought the believers out of Missouri, and the Saints "had obeyed him implicitly." But with Young and the others in Europe, Smith recovered his earlier prestige and authority. Meanwhile, the missionaries found many willing converts in Great Britain, often poor factory workers. These first trickled, then flooded, into Nauvoo, raising Smith's spirits.

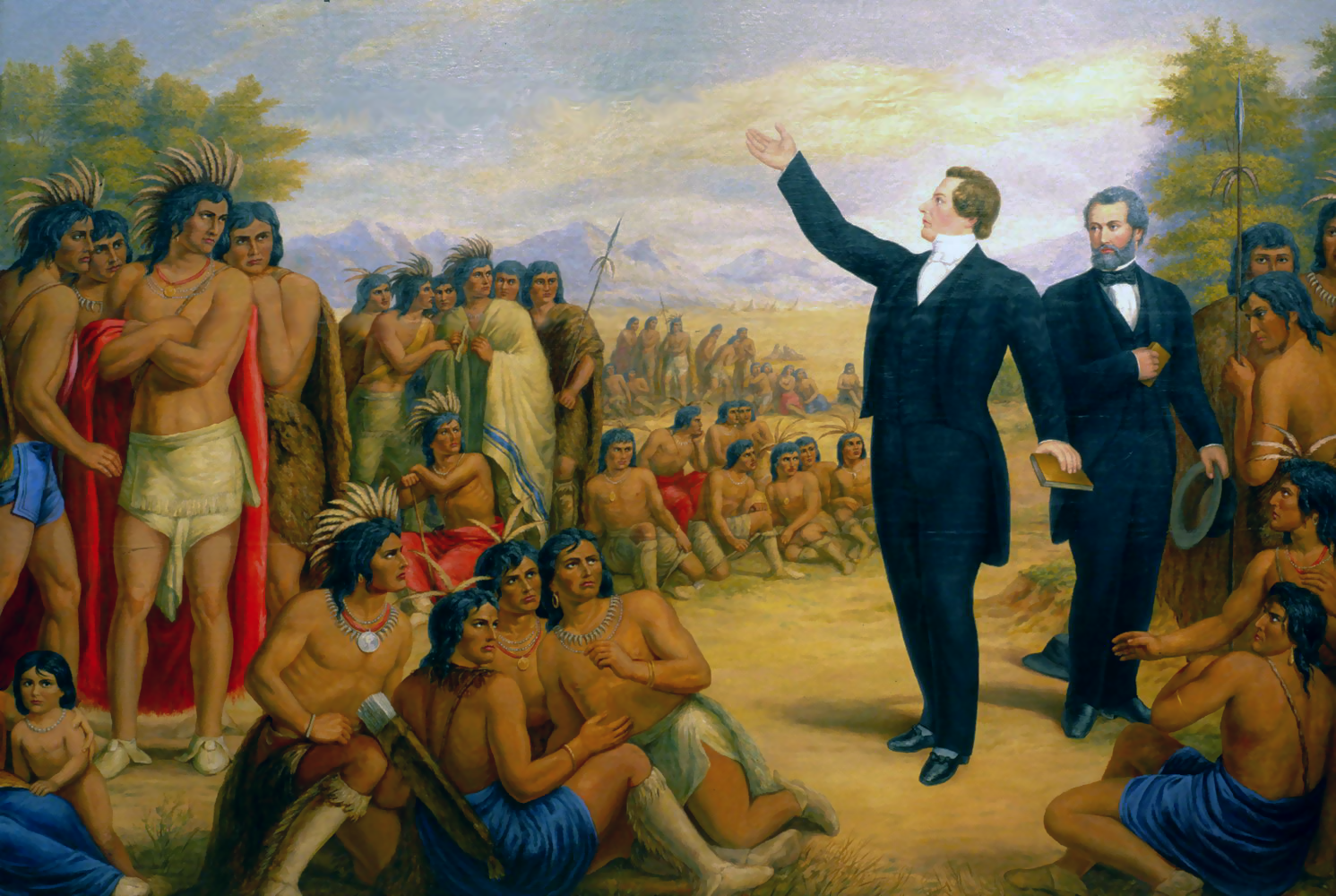
Smith preaching to the Sac and Fox Indians who visited Nauvoo on August 12, 1841.

In February 1841, Nauvoo received a charter from the state of Illinois, which granted the Latter Day Saints a considerable degree of autonomy. Smith threw himself into the work of building a new city. The charter authorized independent municipal courts, the establishment of a university, and the creation of a militia unit known as the "Nauvoo Legion." Smith dreamed of industrial projects, and even received a revelation commanding the building of a hotel, "that strangers may come from afar to lodge therein."

Work on a temple in Nauvoo began in the autumn of 1840. The cornerstones were laid during a conference on April 6, 1841. Construction took five years and it was dedicated on May 1, 1846, about four months after Nauvoo was abandoned by the majority of the citizens.

== New doctrines ==
While burdened with the temporal business of creating a city, Smith also elaborated on the cosmology of the new religion. According to Richard Bushman, Smith moved from "a traditional Christian belief in God as pure spirit to a belief in His corporeality." In other words, Smith declared that God had a body of flesh and bone and taught that "the great principle of happiness consists in having a body."

Instead of affirming that there was an eternal God who had created matter, Smith taught that matter was eternal and that it was God who had developed through time and space. God only assembled the earth from preexisting materials and then had drawn on "a cohort of spirits from the pool of eternal intelligences to place upon it." Another striking doctrine revealed to Smith after 1840 was baptism for the dead, an attempt to join "the generation of humanity from start to finish" by bringing "saving ordinances to the millions who had died without their benefits." During the same period, Smith published the Book of Abraham, his translation of what later turned out to be an ancient Egyptian Book of the Dead that he had purchased from a traveling exhibitor in 1835. The Book of Abraham, canonized by the LDS Church after Smith's death, also emphasized the plurality of gods, pre-mortal existence, and the concept that the earth had been organized out of preexisting matter.

These doctrinal expansions culminated in a renewed effort to build another temple. Smith chose a site on a bluff in Nauvoo where he blessed the cornerstones in a public ceremony on April 6, 1841. In Kirtland, Smith had instituted rituals of washing and anointing, but in Nauvoo "the ceremonies were further elaborated to include baptism for the dead, endowments, and priesthood marriages." Smith had "a green thumb for growing ideas from tiny seeds," and "portions of the temple ritual resembled Masonic rites that Joseph had observed when a Nauvoo lodge was organized in March 1842 and that he may have heard about from Hyrum, a Mason from New York days."

=== Book of Abraham ===
In 1835, Smith encouraged some Latter Day Saints in Kirtland to purchase rolls of ancient Egyptian papyri from a traveling exhibitor. He said they contained the writings of the ancient patriarchs Abraham and Joseph. Over the next several years, Smith dictated to scribes what he reported was a revelatory translation of one of these rolls, which was published in 1842 as the Book of Abraham. The Book of Abraham speaks of the founding of the Abrahamic nation, astronomy, cosmology, lineage and priesthood, and gives another account of the creation story.

The papyri associated with the Book of Abraham were thought to have been lost in the Great Chicago Fire, but several fragments were rediscovered in the 1960s. Egyptologists have subsequently determined them to be part of the Egyptian Book of Breathing with no connection to Abraham. (The papyri were prepared for the funerary rites of one Ta-Shert-Min, daughter of New-Khensu. Latter-day Saints have posited that the papyri could have inspired Smith to dictate the Book of Abraham as a revelation, even if it is not a conventional translation of the papyri's content..)

== Plural marriage ==
The early years in Nauvoo had been a time of comparative peace and economic prosperity, but by mid-1842, Smith was entangled in the conflicts that ended with his death two years later. A year previous, Missouri courts had once again tried to extradite him on old charges that stemmed from the Mormon War. Although Stephen Douglas, then a member of the Illinois State Supreme Court, declared the writ of extradition void on a technicality, Smith "realized that popular opinion was turning against the Saints after two years of sympathy." Not surprisingly, Smith's praise for the Democrat Douglas first provoked opposition to the Mormons in a Whig newspaper, the Warsaw Signal, whose young editor, Thomas C. Sharp, Joseph then unwisely offended.

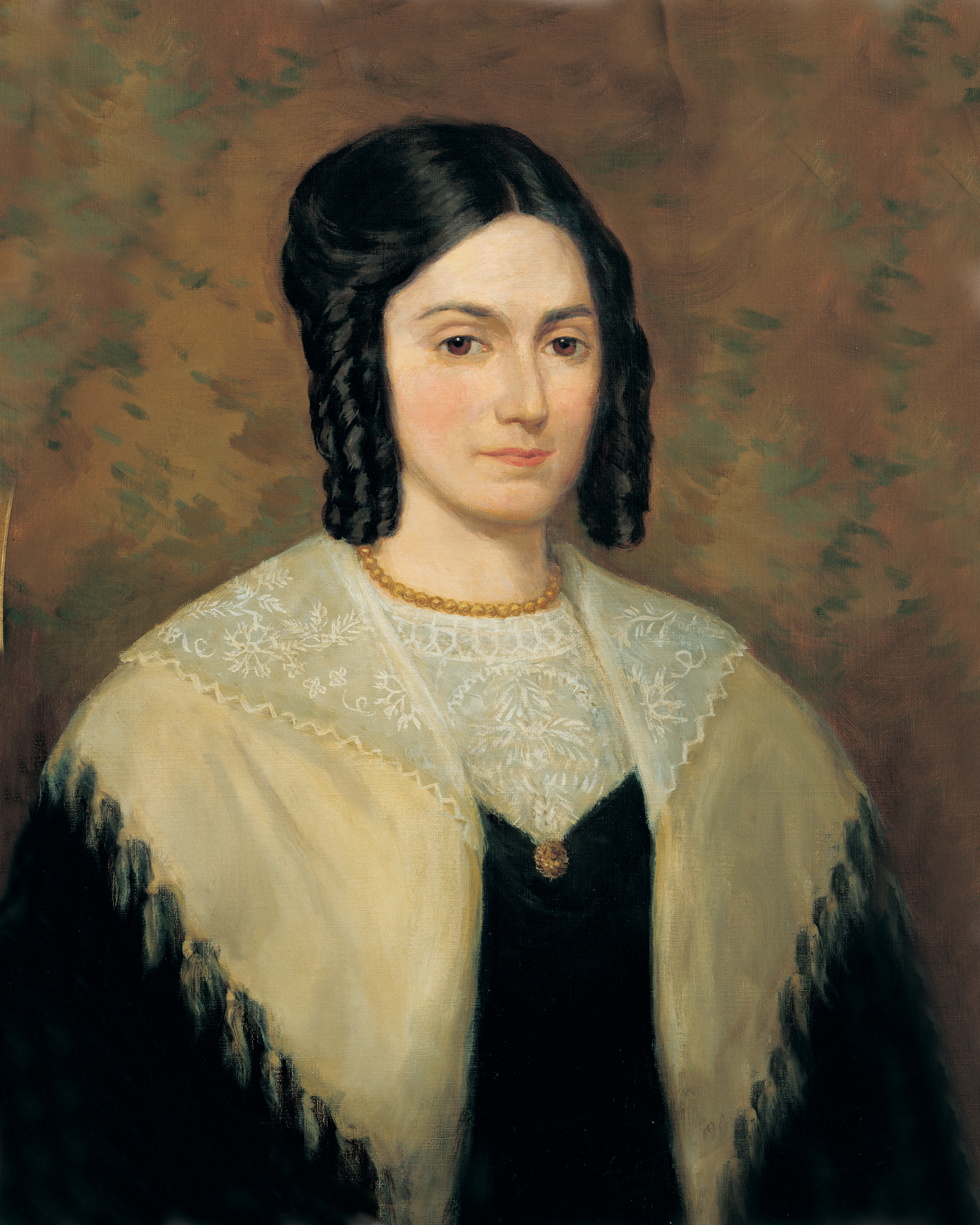
Emma Hale Smith, wife of Joseph Smith. Throughout her life, and even on her deathbed, Emma Smith denied that her husband had ever practiced polygamy.

Of all Smith's innovations during the years immediately preceding his death, the one that received the most hostile reception was his institution of plural marriage. Joseph Smith married at least twenty-eight women. In April 1841, Smith secretly wed Louisa Beaman as a plural wife, and during the next two and a half years, he may have married thirty additional women, ten of them already married to other men. About a third of Smith's plural wives were teenagers, including two fourteen-year-old girls. Smith was "a charismatic, handsome man," and in Remini's words, he "seemed cheerful and gracious" to all. Because many husbands and fathers knew about these plural marriages, Smith must have convinced them that "they and their families would benefit spiritually from a close tie to the Prophet." Smith told one prospective wife that submitting to plural marriage would "ensure your eternal salvation & exaltation and that of your father's household"; a father who gave his daughter in plural marriage was assured that the marriage would ensure "honor and immortality and eternal life to all your house both old and young." Furthermore, once sealed for eternity by priesthood authority, Smith revealed that such couples would continue to procreate in the next life, becoming, in effect, gods.

Smith surely "must have realized that plural marriage would inflict terrible damage, that he ran the risk of wrecking his marriage and alienating his followers." And for those in the larger world, plural marriage "would confirm all their worst fears" about Mormonism. "Sexual excess was considered that all too common fruit of pretended revelation."

Although Emma believed in Joseph's prophetic calling, she was displeased with his multiple marriages, especially since five of the women lived in the Smith household when he married them. Emma may have temporarily approved of Joseph's marriage to two sisters, Eliza and Emily Partridge, but even they were an "awkward selection" because Joseph had already married the sisters two months previous, and he had to go through another ceremony for Emma's benefit. Nevertheless, "from that hour," Emily later wrote, "Emma was our bitter enemy," and they had to leave the household. According to Smith's scribe, William Clayton, Joseph's brother Hyrum encouraged him to write down his revelation on plural marriage to present to Emma, and Joseph did so. When Hyrum presented Emma with the revelation, she abused him. Clayton reported that when Joseph reproved Emma for demanding from one plural wife a watch Joseph had given her, Joseph "had to use harsh measures to put a stop to [Emma's] abuse."

Throughout her life and on her deathbed, Emma Smith frequently denied that her husband had ever taken additional wives. Even when her sons Joseph III and Alexander presented her with specific written questions about polygamy, she continued to deny that their father had been a polygamist.

=== Disclosure to others ===
Although Smith's teachings about plural marriage were expressed in strict confidentiality and only to his leadership, the more men and women who participated, the more likely it became that these secret marriages would be revealed to the Nauvoo community and, of course, to the larger world. By May 16, 1842, the New York Herald reported the rumor that "promiscuous intercourse" was being practiced in Nauvoo. Yet Smith might have been able to talk down these reports along with other salacious gossip had it not been for his erstwhile second-in-command, John Cook Bennett. Smith was not always a good judge of men, and Bennett shortly became Smith's nemesis, although Smith had first predicted that Bennett was "calculated to be a great blessing to our community."

After arriving in Nauvoo in 1841, Bennett had been baptized into the new religion. Emma never trusted him, but Joseph welcomed his assistance in acquiring the Nauvoo city charter. Soon Bennett became the first mayor of Nauvoo, "assistant president," and Major General of the Nauvoo Legion. The latter Bennett threatened to use in challenging Missouri for restitution of the Saints' lost property, suggesting to skittish gentiles that Mormons intended to use force of arms to accomplish their objectives. Unfortunately Smith had an eye for women and even began marrying other members wives. Bennett was afraid he was going to give the church the reputation of a sex cult so he left the church and started a newspaper. Smith was incensed at Bennett's activities and forced Bennett's resignation as Nauvoo mayor. In retaliation, Bennett remained in the area and wrote "lurid exposés of life in Nauvoo" that were first published in various newspapers and, later that year, compiled into a book. Even contemporaries could hardly escape the conclusion that Bennett was, as Fawn Brodie called him, "a base and ignoble opportunist." But the Ostlings note that "there was just enough of a kernel of truth to arouse internal suspicion and whip up anti-Mormon sentiment elsewhere." Non-Mormons looked with increasing uneasiness not only at reports of Mormon "free wifery" but at the comparative success of Nauvoo, the competent drilling of the Nauvoo Legion, and the growing political clout of the Saints.

Smith was accused by Sarah Pratt in an 1886 interview with "vitriolic anti-Mormon journalist W. Wyl" of allowing John C. Bennett, a medical doctor, to perform abortions on polygamous wives who were officially single, which she alleged limited Smith's progeny from these wives. She based this on statements made to her by Bennett. Orson Pratt, Sarah Pratt's husband, considered Bennett a liar whereas Sarah Pratt herself said, "[I] know that the principle statements in John C. Bennett's book on Mormonism are true."

== Allegations against Smith ==
=== Boggs assassination attempt ===
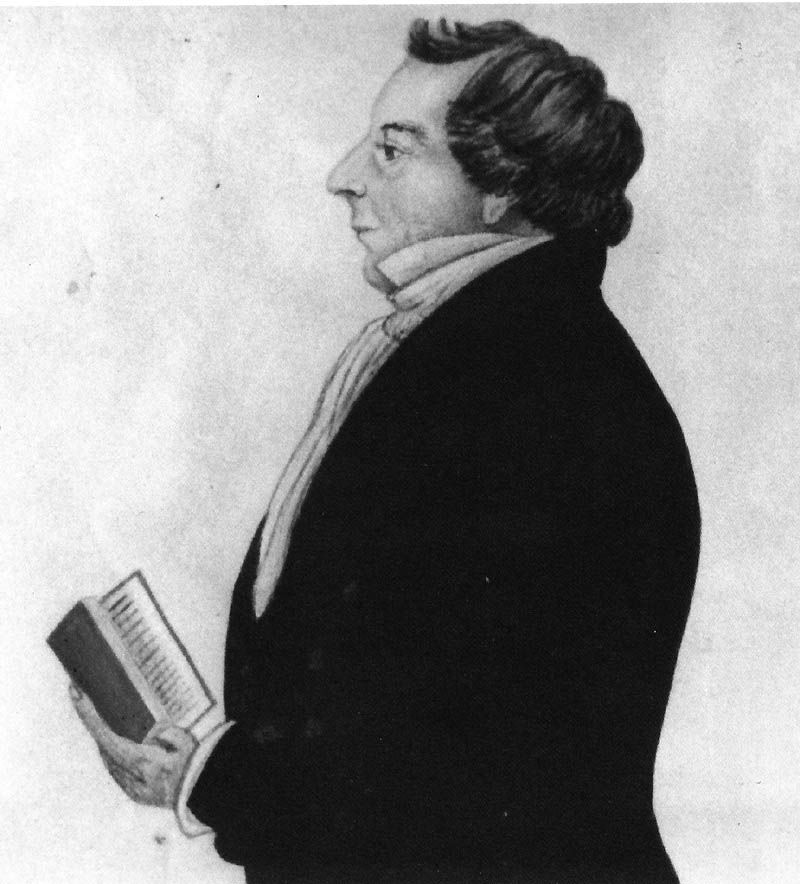
Profile of Joseph Smith (circa 1843) by Bathsheba W. Smith, first wife of Apostle George A. Smith

On May 6, 1842, an unknown assailant shot former governor of Missouri Lilburn Boggs three times in the head. Sheriff J.H. Reynolds discovered a revolver at the scene, still loaded with buckshot and surmised that the suspect lost his friend in the dark rainy night. Bennett named a rough Mormon loyalist, Porter Rockwell, as the gunman. Mormons assumed Boggs would die and considered his assassination a fulfillment of prophecy. The Nauvoo Wasp indiscreetly gloated that the person who "did the noble deed remains to be found out." Boggs did not die, however, and when he recovered, he pressed Illinois governor Thomas Carlin to extradite Smith to Missouri. Smith once again went into hiding for some months until the U. S. Circuit Court in Springfield finally ruled that the extradition order was unconstitutional.

The popular press was quick to blame Smith's friend and bodyguard Porter Rockwell for the assassination attempt. By some reports, Smith had prophesied that Boggs would die violently, leading to speculation that Smith was involved.

=== Bennett and "spiritual wifery" ===
Also at about this time, Bennett had become disaffected from Smith and began publicizing what he said was Smith's practice of "Spiritual Wifery". (Bennett, earlier a pro-polygamy activist, knew of Smith's revelation on plural marriage and encouraged Smith to advocate the practice publicly. When this was rejected by Smith, Bennett began seducing women on his own and was subsequently excommunicated for practicing "Spiritual Wifery". He stepped down as Nauvoo mayor—ostensibly in protest of Smith's actions—and also reported that Smith had offered a cash reward to anyone who would assassinate Boggs. He also reported that Smith had admitted to him that Rockwell had done the deed and that Rockwell had made a veiled threat on Bennett's life if he publicized the story. Smith vehemently denied Bennett's account, speculating that Boggs—no longer governor, but campaigning for state senate—was attacked by an election opponent.

Critics suggested that Nauvoo's charter should be revoked, and the Illinois legislature considered the proposal. In response, Smith petitioned the U.S. Congress to make Nauvoo a territory. His petition was declined.

== Kinderhook Plates ==
In April 1843, twelve men in Kinderhook, Pike County, Illinois, indicated they had found six small brass plates on the property of Robert Wiley. Wiley had indicated that he had dreamed on three consecutive nights of treasure being buried in a mound, which had caused the plates to be discovered. In reality, Wiley, W. Fugate, and a blacksmith named Whiddon had counterfeited the plates making the characters with an acid process.

A letter was sent to the Times and Seasons revealing the discovery. An editorial was published on May 3, 1843 in the Quincy Whig observing that "some pretend to say that Smith, the Mormon leader, has the ability to read them" and that "it would go to prove the authenticity of the Book of Mormon."

After a few weeks had passed the plates were brought to Joseph Smith to be translated. Several men presented themselves at Smith's home with the plates to determine if Joseph could translate them. Willard Richards records that Joseph sent William Smith for a Hebrew Bible and lexicon, seemingly in an attempt to translate the plates in a conventional process. William Clayton, in a conflicting account, wrote in his journal: "I have seen 6 brass plates... covered with ancient characters of language containing from 30 to 40 on each side of the plates. Prest J. has translated a portion and says they contain the history of the person with whom they were found and he was a descendant of Ham through the loins of Pharaoh king of Egypt, and that he received his kingdom from the ruler of heaven and earth."

After this initial meeting, no further mention was ever made by Joseph Smith regarding translation of these plates. Smith may not have sensed the fraud; however he never pursued their translation. Whiddon, Wiley, and Fugate never said anything further regarding their fraud until 1879, when one of the party signed an affidavit revealing their fabrication and their desire to ensnare Smith.

The plates were lost in the Civil War but re-discovered by a Mormon scholar in the archives of the Chicago Historical Society Museum in the 1960s. Non-destructive tests were permitted to be done in 1965 by a Mormon Physicist, George M. Lawrence. In his report Lawrence wrote: The dimensions, tolerances, composition and workmanship are consistent with the facilities of an 1843 blacksmith shop and with the fraud stories of the original participants." This conclusion was not accepted by the Church at large and the original claim of Smith's translation persisted in Church books and publications until 1980 when conclusive tests were completed that determined the plates were made from a modern alloy.

== Nauvoo Legion ==
Among the powers granted to the City of Nauvoo under its city charter was the authority to create a "body of independent militarymen." This force was a militia, and it became known as the "Nauvoo Legion". By 1842, the militia had 2,000 troops, and at least 3,000 by 1844, including some non-Mormons. In comparison, the U.S. Army had only 8,500 men in this period.

Although the charter authorizing the Nauvoo Legion created an independent militia, it could be used by the state governor, the president of the United States, or the mayor of Nauvoo. Joseph Smith himself was Nauvoo's second mayor, and Nauvoo also appointed him highest ranking officer of the legion, a lieutenant general, making him the highest-ranking military officer in the United States and first lieutenant general since George Washington.

In the last month of his life, June 1844, Smith declared martial law in Nauvoo and deployed the legion to defend the city.

== Arrest attempt ==
On June 17, 1843, a warrant for Joseph Smith’s arrest was jointly issued by Illinois governor Thomas Ford and Missouri governor Thomas Reynolds on grounds of treason. Governor Ford called on Harmon T. Wilson, the constable of Carthage, Illinois and Joseph H. Reynolds, the sheriff of Jackson County, Missouri to apprehend Smith and bring him to Missouri. On June 23, disguised as Mormon elders, the two arrested Smith at gunpoint in the town of Dixon, threatening Smith’s companion Stephen Markham in the process. The Fifth Legion, second cohort of the Nauvoo Legion immediately mustered under the direction of colonel Hosea Stout.

On June 24, among rumors of John C. Bennett forming an invading army and rumors of Governor Ford seeking to betray Joseph Smith, the Nauvoo City council enacted what amounted to martial law. Legion troops organized and waited for instruction.

On June 25, Joseph Smith sent a letter to Wilson Law, general in the Nauvoo Legion, asking him to bring a force to prevent his “being kidnapped into Missouri.” A call for volunteers was issued; Wilson Law and Charles C. Rich led 100 men out of Nauvoo that night. Dan Jones led an additional seventy-five men by boat the next morning. In all, between 100-300 men left Nauvoo to rescue Joseph Smith.

On June 27, Reynolds and Wilson, with Smith in custody, crossed the Fox River from Dixon into Monmouth, where they were greeted by Nauvoo Legion scouts. Joseph Smith told his captors, “I am not going to Missouri this time. These are my boys!” They were joined that day by the large company of the Nauvoo Legion volunteers.

On June 28, Reynolds and Wilson were arrested for threatening citizens of the state and committing false imprisonment. They began to travel towards Quincy to be reviewed by the nearest judicial court, which operated under Stephen Douglas. On June 29th they were intercepted by Generals Wilson and William Law, 60 of the Nauvoo cavalry, and 100 additional men. The destination was changed to the nearby Nauvoo Court through the efforts of criminal lawyer and Whig congressional candidate Cyrus Walker.

The group was greeted in Nauvoo by prominent members of the city, the Nauvoo Brass band, and a parade of the Nauvoo Legion, while cannons fired in the distance. Smith hosted a dinner party with Reynolds and Wilson as honored guests. After dinner, the Nauvoo municipal court convened and ultimately released Smith “for want of substance in the warrant upon which he was arrested.” Smith spent the next few days greeting various volunteer units of the Nauvoo Legion as they returned home, blessing them for their loyalty and efforts, and recounting the story of his kidnapping and triumphant return.

== Increasing tensions ==
In December 1843, Smith petitioned Congress for the right to make Nauvoo an independent federal territory with the right to call out federal troops in its defense. Then, probably unwisely, Smith also decided to desert both Whigs and Democrats, and announced his own candidacy for President of the United States. Meanwhile, he made plans to scout possible sites for a large Mormon settlement in Oregon or California.

== Council of Fifty ==
In March 1844, Smith organized a secret Council of Fifty, a policy-making body based on what Smith called "Theodemocracy" and which was in effect a shadow government. One of the council's first acts was to ordain Smith as King of the Kingdom of God. And, as if they had just organized an independent state, Smith and the council sent ambassadors to England, France, Russia, and the Republic of Texas. In April, Smith predicted "the entire overthrow of this nation in a few years."

== United States presidential campaign ==
Smith wrote to the leading presidential candidates and asked them what they would do to protect the Mormons. After receiving noncommittal or negative responses, Smith announced his own third-party candidacy for President of the United States, suspended regular proselytizing, and sent out the Quorum of the Twelve and hundreds of other political missionaries. The Anointed Quorum chose Sidney Rigdon as Smith's running mate. His top aide Brigham Young campaigned for Smith.

=== Political positions ===
Smith proposed the redemption of slaves by selling public lands and decreasing the size and salary of Congress; the closure of prisons; the annexation of Texas, Oregon, and parts of Canada; the securing of international rights on high seas; free trade; and the re-establishment of a national bank.

== Smith's death ==
=== Dissent in Nauvoo ===
Smith faced growing opposition among his former supporters in Nauvoo, and he "was stunned by the defections of loyal followers." Chief among the dissidents was William Law, Smith's second counselor in the First Presidency, who was well respected in the Mormon community. Law's disagreement with Smith was partly economic. But the most significant difference between the two was Law's opposition to plural marriage. Law and others gave testimonies at the county seat in Carthage that resulted in three indictments being brought against Smith, including one accusing him of polygamy. There is even evidence that Smith propositioned the wives of both Law and his associate Robert D. Foster. On May 26, just a few weeks before his death, Smith spoke before a large crowd of the Saints in front of the uncompleted temple and once again denied having any more than one wife.

=== Nauvoo Expositor ===
Unlike earlier dissenters Law had enough money to buy a printing press and publish a newspaper called the Nauvoo Expositor. Its only edition, published on June 7, 1844, contained affidavits testifying that the signers had heard Smith read a revelation giving every man the privilege of marrying ten virgins. The paper also attacked the attempt to "christianize a world by political schemes and intrigue" and denounced "false doctrines" such as "doctrines of many Gods," which, the paper said, Smith had recently revealed in his King Follett discourse. The newspaper also refused to "acknowledge any man as king or lawgiver to the church."

Smith declared the Expositor a "nuisance." On June 10, the Nauvoo city council passed an ordinance about libels; and Smith, as mayor, ordered the city marshal to destroy the paper. Press, type, and newspapers were dragged into the street and burned. Smith argued that destroying the paper would lessen the possibility of anti-Mormon settlers attacking Nauvoo; but he "failed to see that suppression of the paper was far more likely to arouse a mob than the libels. It was a fatal mistake."

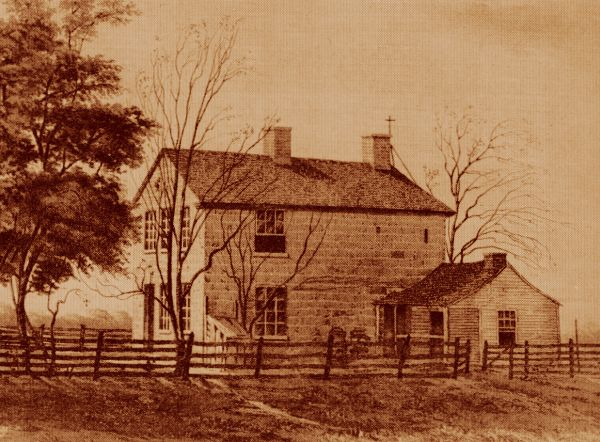
Carthage Jail (c. 1885), where Smith was killed in 1844

When the destruction of the Expositor was reported to Smith's journalistic enemy Thomas C. Sharp, his Warsaw Signal published a call to action: "Citizens arise, one and all!!! Can you stand by, and suffer such Infernal Devils! to rob men of their property and rights without avenging them. We have no time for comment, every man will make his own. Let it be made with Powder and Ball!!!"

Nauvoo Mormons feared reprisals from the non-Mormons, and non-Mormons were apprehensive about the Nauvoo Legion, especially after Smith declared martial law on June 18. Illinois governor Thomas Ford, desperately trying to prevent civil war, then mobilized the state militia. The governor promised Smith that he would provide protection if Smith would stand trial at Carthage for the destruction of the newspaper. Smith ordered the Legion to disarm but then fled across the Mississippi to Iowa. Emma warned Joseph that Nauvoo residents believed he had left due to cowardice and that they feared reprisals from local mobs. Smith returned to Illinois on June 23, gave himself up, and was taken to Carthage to stand trial.

=== Assassination ===
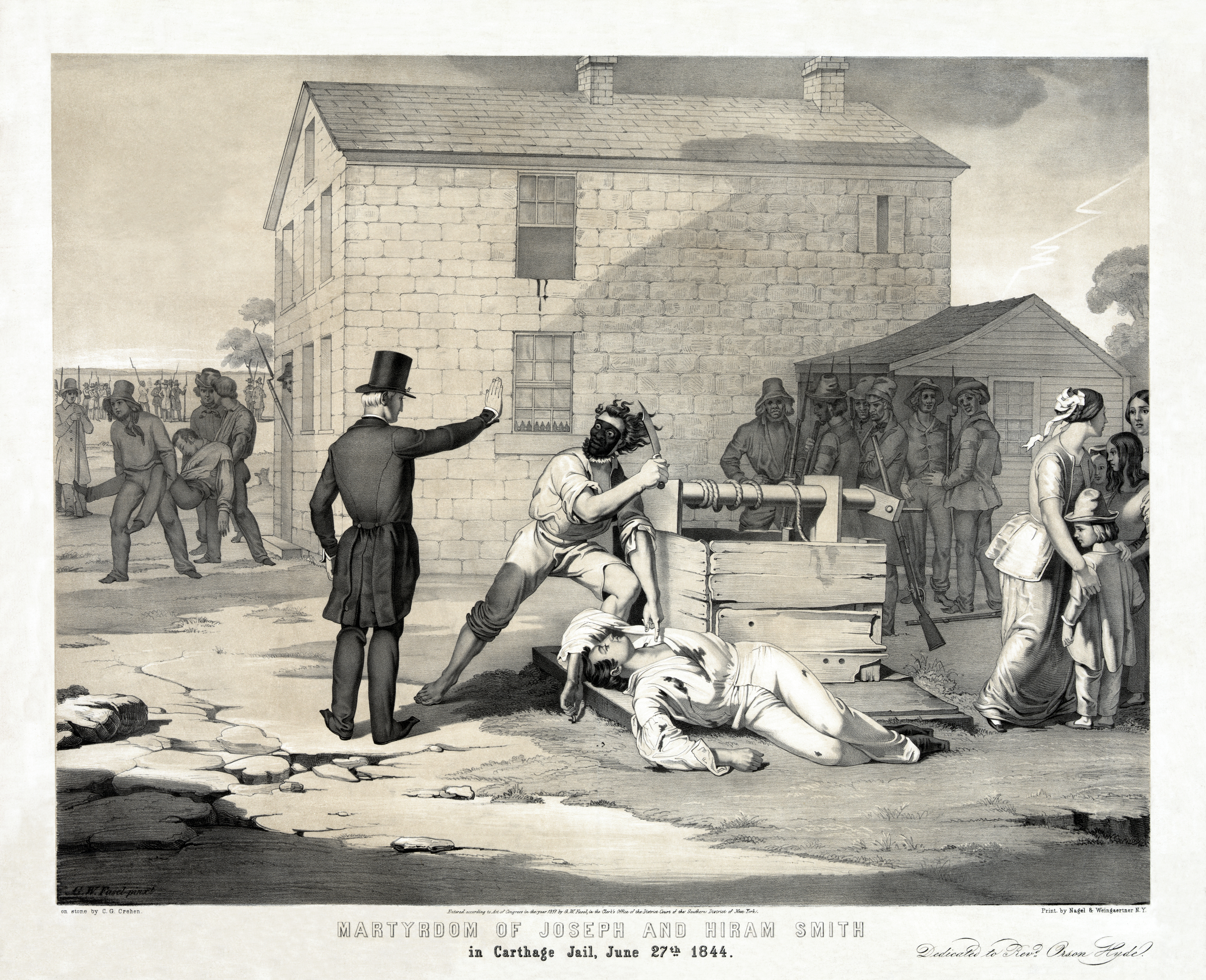
The murder of Joseph and Hyrum Smith

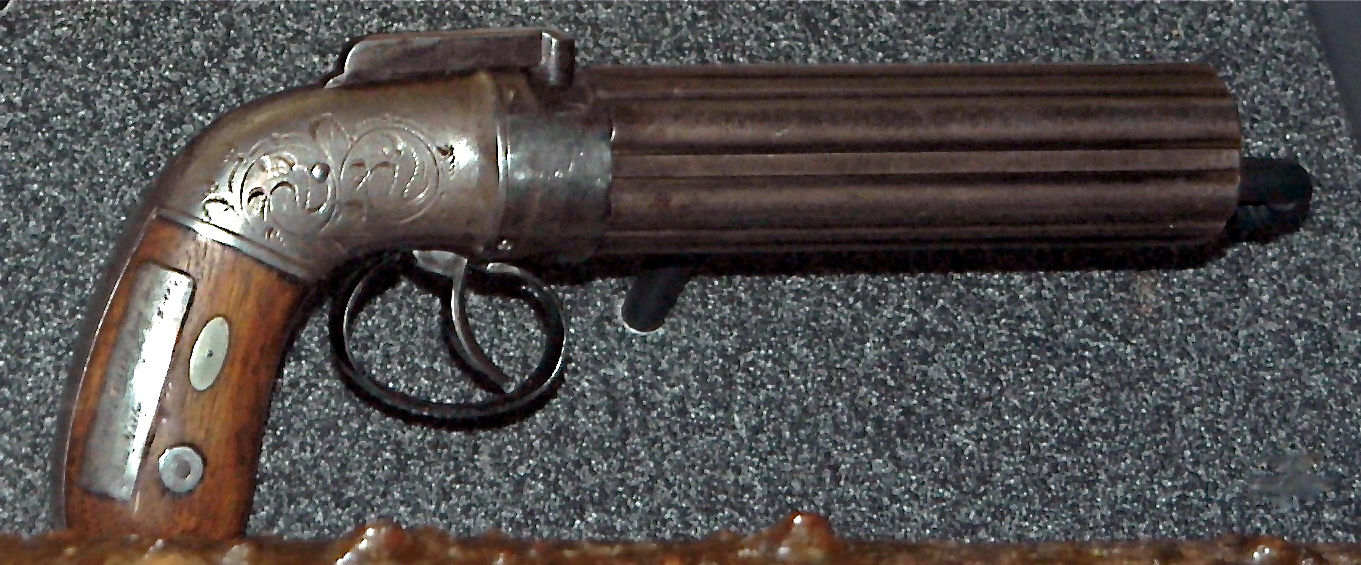
Pepper-box pistol used by Joseph Smith to defend himself on June 27, 1844

After a hearing, Smith was released but stayed in the jail at the request of Governor Dunklin as there were to be additional charges filed the following day. According to Taylor and Richards, Dunklin promised to take Smith back to Nauvoo; however, he left Carthage without him.

Smith and three other Mormon prisoners were held in Carthage Jail in an upstairs room without bars. Both Hyrum and Joseph Smith had pistols that had been smuggled in by friends. On June 27, 1844, an armed group of men with blackened faces stormed the jail. As the mob broke into the room, Hyrum was shot in the face and killed. Smith pulled the trigger of his pepper-box six times, firing into the hall and hitting three men, but the mob continued to fire at Smith and the other Mormons. Smith prepared to jump from the second floor window, but was hit by a ball from the door, causing him to fall out the window. On the ground he stirred a bit; four men fired and killed him.

=== Aftermath ===
Certain the Mormons would retaliate, the people of Carthage deserted their town by nightfall. But the bodies of Joseph and Hyrum were brought back to Nauvoo, and thousands of mourners filed by their coffins. Fearing desecration of the graves, church leaders decided to bury the men in the basement of the unfinished Nauvoo House. The coffins were filled with bags of sand and buried in the cemetery following a public funeral.

Charges were brought against five accused leaders of the mob that had killed Joseph and Hyrum Smith, and they stood trial in May 1845. The defense argued that no individuals could be held responsible because the assassins were carrying out the will of the people. The jury, which included no Mormons, acquitted the defendants.

== See also ==
- Phrenology and the Latter Day Saint Movement

== Sources ==
- Brodie, Fawn M. (1971). No Man Knows My History: The Life of Joseph Smith (2nd ed.). New York, NY: Alfred A. Knopf. ISBN 0-394-46967-4.
- Bushman, Richard Lyman (2005). Joseph Smith: Rough Stone Rolling. New York, NY: Alfred A. Knopf. ISBN 1-4000-4270-4.
- Clark, Jerome Leslie (1968), 1844: Religious Movements, vol. 1, Nashville, TN: Southern Publishing Association, p. 157, ISBN 978-1-57258-068-8
- La Rue, William Earl (1919), The Foundations of Mormonism: A Study of the Fundamental Facts in the History and Doctrines of the Mormons from Original Sources, New York: Fleming H. Revell Company, p. 215
- Marquardt, H. Michael (1999), The Joseph Smith Revelations: Text and Commentary, Signature Books, ISBN 978-1-56085-126-4.
- Marquardt, H. Michael (2005), The Rise of Mormonism: 1816–1844, Grand Rapids, MI: Xulon Press, p. 632, ISBN 1-59781-470-9
- Newell, Linda King; Avery, Valeen Tippetts (1994). Mormon Enigma: Emma Hale Smith (2nd ed.). Urbana, IL: University of Illinois Press. ISBN 0-252-06291-4.
- Roberts, Brigham Henry (1912), History of the Church of Jesus Christ of Latter-day Saints, vol. 6, Salt Lake City, UT: Deseret News, pp. 430–432.
- Smith, Andrew F. (1971), The Saintly Scoundrel: The Life and Times of Dr. John Cook Bennett, Urbana and Chicago: University of Illinois Press, ISBN 978-0-252-02282-1
- Van Wagoner, Richard S. (1992). Mormon Polygamy: A History (2nd ed.). Salt Lake City, UT: Signature Books. ISBN 978-0-941214-79-7.
- Wymetal, Wilhelm Ritter von (1886), Joseph Smith, the Prophet, His Family, and His Friends: A Study Based on Facts and Documents, Salt Lake City, UT: Tribune Printing and Publishing Company, pp. 60–61

Preceded by 1838–39	Joseph Smith; 1839–44	Succeeded by Death
