= Life of Joseph Smith from 1831 to 1837 =

The life of Joseph Smith, Jr. from 1831 to 1837, when he was 26–32 years old, covers the period of time from when Smith moved with his family to Kirtland, Ohio, in 1831, until he left Ohio for Missouri early in early January 1838. By 1831, Smith had already published the Book of Mormon, and established the Latter Day Saint movement. He had founded it as the Church of Christ, but eventually dictated a revelation to change its name to the Church of Jesus Christ of Latter Day Saints.

== Move to Kirtland, Ohio ==
After receiving what Smith described as revelations, Smith and his wife Emma Hale Smith moved to Kirtland, Ohio, early in 1831, arriving about February 3. They lived with Isaac Morley's family while a house was built for them on the Morley farm. Many of Smith's followers and associates settled in Kirtland, and also in Jackson County, Missouri, where Smith said he was instructed by revelation to build Zion.

== Tarring and feathering ==
On March 24, 1832, while living in Hiram Township at the home of John and Elsa Johnson, Joseph was dragged from his bedroom in the dead of night. His attackers strangled him, tore off his clothes, beat and scratched him, and attempted to force him to ingest poison. They then poured hot tar and feathers on his body, and left him for dead.

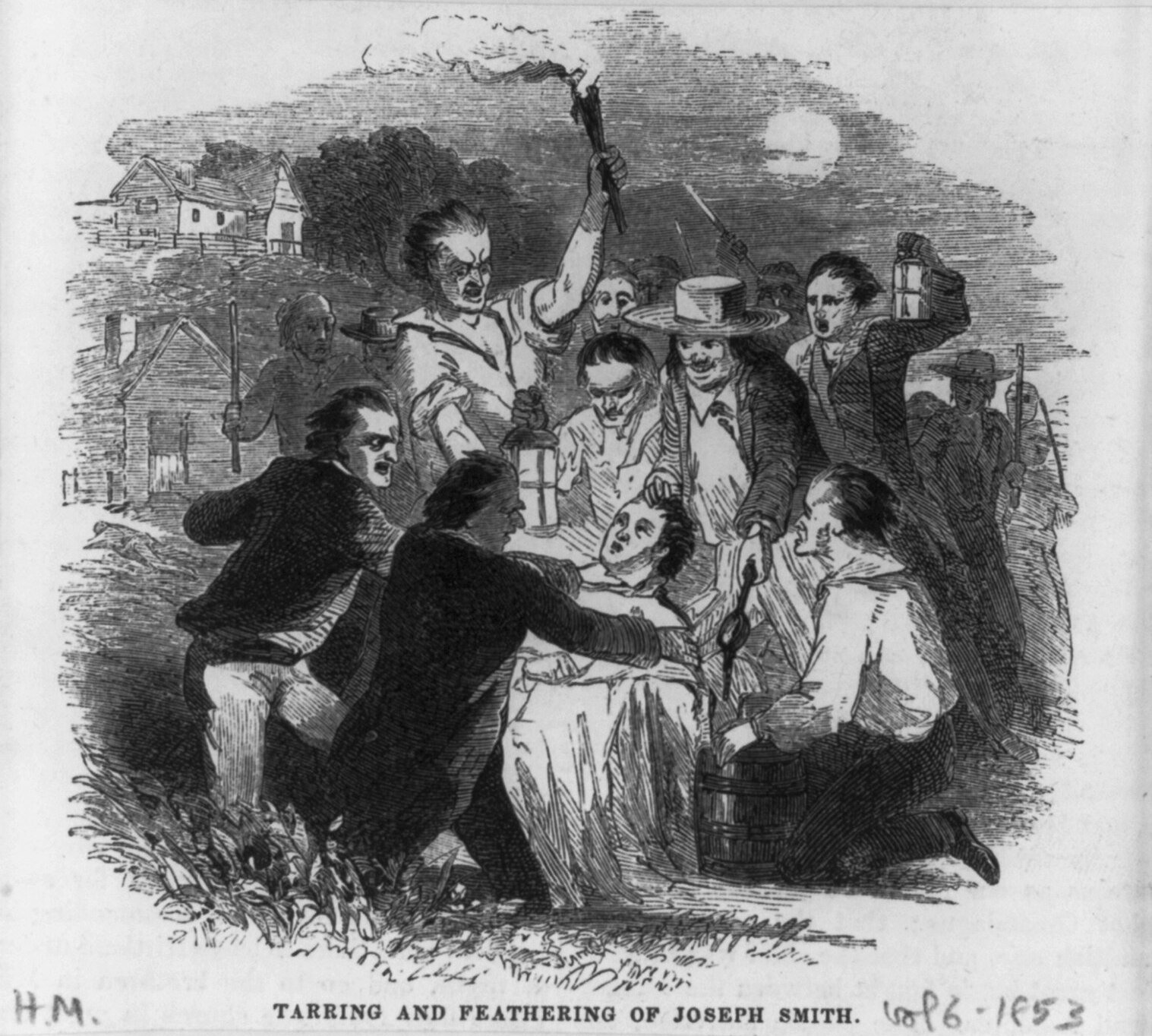
Illustration of a mob tarring and feathering Joseph Smith.

According to recorded accounts of the event, the mob broke down the front door, took Smith's oldest surviving adopted child from his arms, dragged Smith from the room, leaving his exposed child on a trundle bed and forcing Emma and the others from the house, the mob threatening her with rape and murder. The child was knocked off the bed onto the floor in the doorway of the home as Smith was forcibly removed from his home. The child, eleven months old and already weakened by the measles, developed a "severe cold" (possibly pneumonia) from the exposure and died five days later from the condition.

=== Motive ===
Most early accounts attributed the attack to opposition to Smith's and Rigdon's religious teachings, particularly the consecration of property in which church members were asked to deed their property to the church. Symonds Ryder, a participant in the mob and disaffected Mormon, wrote in 1868 that the attack stemmed from a dispute over land, claiming Smith and Rigdon attempted to take property from the Johnson family. This explanation is supported by other accounts from the period. Joseph Smith's own history, compiled in the 1830s and 1840s, emphasizes the religious hostility of local residents and the violent reaction to the Church's growing influence. Smith also identifies Symonds Ryder as a ringleader and Eli Johnson as one of the instigators.

A more controversial theory emerged in the mid-20th century, alleging that the mob was incited by rumors of sexual impropriety between Joseph Smith and Nancy Marinda Johnson, a member of the household where Smith was staying. This theory was popularized by Fawn M. Brodie in her 1945 biography of Smith. Brodie relied on an 1884 public debate in which Clark Braden, an anti-Mormon polemicist with only second-hand knowledge of the event, claimed that Eli Johnson—misidentified as Marinda's brother—led the mob in outrage and demanded Smith's castration.

Later scholarship has largely rejected the Brodie–Braden hypothesis. Modern scholar Richard Bushman explicitly rejects the sexual misconduct theory, stating that it “falls for lack of evidence.” Historian Richard S. Van Wagoner references the rumor but ultimately deems it “unlikely,” describing Braden's account as “likely apocryphal", noting the lack of corroborating evidence and the genealogical error.

== Zion's Camp ==
As early as 1831, Smith had stated that the City of Zion would be built in Jackson County, Missouri, with Independence as the centerplace for Zion. Many Latter Day Saints began to gather to that area. Many local non-Mormons in Jackson County became alarmed at the movement's rapid growth. Forming vigilante groups, many burned Latter Day Saint homes and destroyed the church print shop. Many Latter Day Saints were threatened and abused and by 1833, nearly all had fled from the county for their safety. The Mormon refugees then settled temporarily in neighboring counties, including Clay County in particular.

In 1834, Smith called for a militia to be raised in Kirtland which would then march to Missouri and "redeem Zion." About 200 men and a number of women and children volunteered to join this militia which became known as "Zion's Camp." It was agreed that Smith would be the leader of the group.

Zion's Camp left Kirtland on May 4, 1834. They had marched across the Illinois River, reached the Mississippi River, and entered Missouri by June 4. They crossed most of the state by the end of June and news of their approach caused some alarm among non-Mormons in Jackson and Clay Counties. Attempts to negotiate a return of the Latter Day Saints to Jackson County proved fruitless. Smith decided to disband Zion's Camp, rather than attempt to "redeem Zion" by force. Many members of the camp subsequently became ill with cholera.

Although the Latter Day Saints failed to achieve their goal of returning to Jackson County, Missouri's legislature later approved a compromise which set aside the new county of Caldwell specifically for their settlement in 1836.

While the march failed to return Latter Day Saint property, many of its participants became committed loyalists in the movement. When Smith returned to Kirtland, he organized the Quorum of the Twelve Apostles, and the First Quorum of the Seventy, choosing primarily men who had served in Zion's Camp.

== Doctrine and Covenants ==
During the Kirtland period, Smith's followers published a collection of his revelations, titled the "Book of Commandments," which was renamed the Doctrine and Covenants in later printings.

== Kirtland Temple ==
In Kirtland, the church's first temple was built. Work was begun in 1833, and the temple was dedicated in 1836. At and around the dedication, many extraordinary events were reported: appearances by Jesus, Moses, Elijah, Elias and numerous angels; speaking and singing in tongues, often with translations; prophesying; and other spiritual experiences. Some Mormons believed that Jesus' Millennial reign had come. Smith may have first practiced polygamy during the building of the Kirtland temple.

== In Salem, Massachusetts ==
Construction of the Kirtland Temple had only added to the church's debt, and Smith was hounded by creditors. Having heard of a large sum of money supposedly hidden in Salem, Massachusetts, Smith traveled there and announced a revelation that God had "much treasure in this city". After a month, he and his companions returned to Kirtland empty-handed.

== Kirtland Safety Society ==
By mid to late 1837, many Latter Day Saints (including some prominent leaders) became disaffected in the wake of the Kirtland Safety Society banking debacle, in which Smith and several of Smith's associates were accused of various illegal or unethical banking actions when the bank, with the charter held by Smith, collapsed just prior to a nationwide banking crisis. Many critics leveled accusations that Smith was actively misleading KSS members from the beginning of the financial enterprise as it was operating without an official Ohio bank charter and required reserves. Supporters of Smith, on the other hand, hold that the financial institution's collapse was more than partially due to state and federal financial regulations and that the charges against Smith and his associates are at best inflated.

== Move to Missouri ==
Opposition and harassment grew against Smith and those of his associates who supported him. On January 12, 1838, Smith and Rigdon left Kirtland for Far West in Caldwell County, Missouri, in Smith's words, "to escape mob violence, which was about to burst upon us under the color of legal process."

According to Brodie, writing in 1945, the pair fled "when word came" that a warrant had reportedly been issued for Smith's arrest on a charge of banking fraud; according to Ohio historian James Harrison Kennedy, the rumors that Smith had been charged with Banking Fraud turned out be false.

Writing many decades after Brodie, Bushman attributed the sudden departure to fears that Smith's enemies were "plotting more desperate measures", while Vogel reports a claim from Mormon Luke Johnson, one of the sheriffs in Kirtland, that he briefly placed Smith under arrest, so as to prevent Sheriff Abel Kimball from arresting and potentially imprisoning Smith. Smith and Rigdon successfully escaped to Missouri.

Most of the remaining church members who remained loyal to Smith left Kirtland for Missouri shortly thereafter.

== Notes ==
Preceded by 1827–30	Joseph Smith; 1831–37	Succeeded by 1838–39
