= Salvage (short story) =

- Short story by Orson Scott Card
- Country: United States
- Language: English

Publication
- Published in: Asimov's Science Fiction
- Publication type: Periodical
- Media type: Print (Magazine)
- Publication date: 1986

"Salvage" is a short story by American writer Orson Scott Card, originally published in the February 1986 issue of Asimov's Science Fiction magazine. It appears in Card's short story collection The Folk of the Fringe and was also reprinted in the anthologies Wastelands: Stories of the Apocalypse and The End of the World: Stories of the Apocalypse.

== Plot summary ==
In a post-apocalyptic America, Deaver Teague makes a living salvaging things left behind from before the war. Although he makes more money than a lot of people, he knows that he won't be able to do this job forever. When he hears a couple of truck drivers talking about some gold hidden in a Mormon temple in the now flooded Salt Lake City he decides to go and look for it. Deaver can't do this by himself so he goes to two of his friends, who are not very religious Mormons, and asks them for help. Reluctantly they agree. His friend Lehi gets some diving equipment and his friend Rain agrees to take him out to the temple in her boat. On the way Deaver tells them about how he was orphaned even though he doesn't like to talk about it because he believes that friends don't keep secrets from each other. When they arrive at the temple Deaver dives down into the building and comes up with some pieces of metal which he believes to be the hidden gold. When he gets to the surface, he finds out that they are prayers that people have scratched into flattened tin cans and thrown into the temple windows. When he discovers that his friends knew that people were coming out here and doing this, he feels betrayed because they didn't tell him and he decides to move away.

== Connection to other stories in the series ==
In Card's story "West", Deaver Teague was found by a group of traveling Mormons after his parents were killed. Since the boy had no parents, the group decided to take him along with them to Utah. At the time, he was unable to talk and they did not know his name so he was named after two of the men in the group; Jamie Teague and Brother Deaver. The story "Pageant Wagon" also features Deaver Teague. It takes place when he is in his late twenties and is the story of how he meets up with and joins a group of traveling actors.

== Influences ==
As with many of Card's other literature, a Christian/Mormon influence is present in this story.

== Characters ==
- Deaver Teague
- mechanic - unnamed
- Lehi McKay - Deaver's friend
- Lorraine "Rain" Wilson - Deaver's friend
- staring woman - unnamed
- families that live with Rain - unnamed

== See also ==
- List of works by Orson Scott Card
- Orson Scott Card
- LDS fiction
