= The Folk of the Fringe =

1989 book by Orson Scott Card

- First edition
- Author: Orson Scott Card
- Cover artist: Carl Lundgren
- Language: English
- Genre: Science fiction, post-apocalyptic fiction, LDS fiction
- Publisher: Phantasia Press
- Publication date: 1989
- Publication place: United States
- Media type: Print (hardback & paperback)
- ISBN: 0-7126-3637-4
- OCLC: 60021810

The Folk of the Fringe (1989) is a collection of post-apocalyptic stories by American writer Orson Scott Card. These stories are set sometime in the near future, when World War III has left America in ruins. The stories are about how a few groups of Mormons struggle to survive. Although all of these stories in this book were meant to stand alone, they each include at least one character from one of the other stories which helps to make them a cohesive collection.

== Contents ==
- "West"
- "Salvage"
- "The Fringe"
- "Pageant Wagon"
- "America"

This book also includes interior artwork by Glen R. Bellamy, an "Author's Note: On Sycamore Hill" by Orson Scott Card and an "Afterward: The Folk of the Fringe" by Michael Collings. The essay by Card was originally published in the 55th issue of Science Fiction Review (1985) under the title "On Sycamore Hill: A Personal View".

Many of the stories take place in, or are connected to, a fictional post-apocalyptic state of Deseret around the former Mormon areas of Utah, which was clearly inspired by the historical State of Deseret.

== Influences ==
As with many of Card's other literature, a Christian/Mormon influence is present in this book.

== Publishing information ==
=== US editions ===
- Phantasia Press 1st ed. hardcover February 1989 ISBN 0-932096-49-2
- Tor Books hardcover Copyright 1989 no ISBN printed by R.R.Donnelley & Sons Company
- Tor Books paperback August 15, 1990 ISBN 0-8125-0086-5
- Orb Books paperback August 11, 2001 ISBN 0-312-87663-7

=== UK editions ===
- Legend Books hardcover March 8, 1990 ISBN 0-7126-3637-4
- Legend Books paperback March 8, 1990 ISBN 0-7126-3638-2
- Legend Books paperback May 2, 1991 ISBN 0-09-973440-0

== See also ==
- List of works by Orson Scott Card
- Orson Scott Card
- LDS fiction
