= West (short story) =

- Short story by Orson Scott Card
- Country: United States
- Language: English

Publication
- Published in: Free Lancers: Alien Stars IV
- Publisher: Baen books
- Media type: Print (Paperback)
- Publication date: 1987

Cover of the short story collection Free Lancers: Alien Stars IV.

"West" is a short story by American writer Orson Scott Card, originally published in his short story collection The Folk of the Fringe. Card previously published a shorter version of this story in the collection Free Lancers: Alien Stars IV (1987).

== Plot summary ==
In a post-apocalyptic America, Jamie Teague is traveling from the east coast to his home in the Great Smoky Mountains. Along the way, he comes across a group of people traveling on the highway and headed straight for a group of Bushwhackers that kills anyone who tries to pass. After warning them, Jamie starts to follow them and, when the Winston highway patrol refuses to let them take an alternate route, he decides to help them get past the Bushwhackers. As they travel together, Jamie finds out that the people are Mormons and that they are headed for Utah to avoid being massacred. Knowing that they will die without his help, he agrees to take them as far as his cabin. He also agrees to let them stay with him during the winter. In the spring, Jamie tells the group about how when he was a child his mother made him keep his younger brother and sister locked in a closet until they went insane. After making this confession, Jamie gets baptized as a Mormon and decides to lead the group to Utah. When they finally arrive in Utah, they all settle down into their own homes but remain close friends.

== Connection to other stories in the series ==
During the trip from Jamie Teague’s home in the Great Smoky Mountains to Utah, the group finds a little mute boy whose parents had been killed by mobbers. They take him along with them and he is placed in foster care when they reach Utah. The short story "Salvage" by Orson Scott Card takes place about fifteen years after the events in "West". The little mute boy has grown up and been named Deaver Teague after Jamie Teague and Brother Deaver. In this story, Deaver is a young man who goes diving in a Mormon temple to try to find hidden gold. Deaver is also the main character of the story "Pageant Wagon". It takes place when he is in his late twenties and is the story of how he meets up with and joins a group of traveling actors. At the end of "West", Deaver Teague and his group meet with Sam Monson, the governor of Deseret. In the story "America", Sam met and had a baby with an American Indian woman when he was a teenager.

== Influences ==
As with many of Card's other literature, a Christian/Mormon influence is present in this story.

== See also ==
- List of works by Orson Scott Card
- Orson Scott Card
- LDS fiction
