= The Fringe (short story) =

- Short story by Orson Scott Card
- Country: United States
- Language: English

Publication
- Published in: The Magazine of Fantasy & Science Fiction
- Publication type: Periodical
- Media type: Print (Magazine)
- Publication date: 1985

"The Fringe" is a science fiction short story by American writer Orson Scott Card, originally published in the October 1985 issue of The Magazine of Fantasy & Science Fiction. It was later reprinted in his short story collection The Folk of the Fringe and in Future on Ice, a short story collection edited by Card.

== Plot summary ==
In a post-apocalyptic United States, Timothy Carpenter is a wheelchair-using teacher in a small farming community. When he discovers that the farm foreman, the bishop and some other men are stealing food from the other farmers, he reports this to the authorities. On the day that the marshals are scheduled to show up, he talks to his students about how wrong it is for people to steal. After class is over, the son of the foreman threatens Mr. Carpenter and tells him to keep his mouth shut. Later that day, the authorities show up and arrest the thieves. An hour later, their sons show up at Mr. Carpenter's house and take him out to a dry riverbed that will flood with the coming rain and dump him into it so that he will drown. Just as he is about to drown, he is rescued by a group from a traveling pageant show. When the police show up at his house, Mr. Carpenter refuses to name the boys who attacked him because he feels sorry for their families. However, when he sees them in school the next day, they behave.

== Connection to the other stories ==
After Mr. Carpenter is rescued from drowning, he learns that the acting group that saved him is called the "Sweetwater Miracle Pageant". The story "Pageant Wagon" by Orson Scott Card is about how a young man named Deaver Teague meets up with and joins that same group. Mr. Carpenter is the narrator of the story "America". In that story, he tells about how the governor of Deseret, Sam Monson, met and had a baby with an American Indian woman when he was a teenager.

== Influences ==
As with many of Card's other literature, a Christian/Mormon influence is present in this story.

== See also ==
- List of works by Orson Scott Card
- Orson Scott Card
- LDS fiction
