= America (short story) =

- Short story by Orson Scott Card
- Country: United States
- Language: English

Publication
- Published in: Asimov's Science Fiction
- Publication type: Periodical
- Media type: Print (Magazine)
- Publication date: 1987

"America" is a science fiction short story by American writer Orson Scott Card, originally published in the January 1987 issue of Asimov's Science Fiction magazine. It was reprinted in Card's short story collection The Folk of the Fringe.

== Plot summary ==
This story begins before the war that destroys America. In it, a teenage boy named Sam Monson travels to Brazil with his father. While there, he begins dreaming about a woman who lives in a nearby Indian village named Anamari. When he goes to the village, he finds the woman and begins helping her take care of the villagers. While there, he learns that she also has dreams that come true and that she is dreaming about giving birth to a boy who will become the future leader of an America that is controlled by American Indians. On his last night in Brazil, Sam sleeps with Anamari and she gets pregnant with that boy. Years after the war when Sam is the governor of the state of Deseret, Amamari comes to meet with him to negotiate a peace treaty on behalf of their son, Quetzalcoatl (named after Quetzalcoatl, a Mesoamerican deity). Sam goes, and takes with him a man named Carpenter, to whom he later tells his story.

== Connection to the other stories ==
At the end of the story "West" by Orson Scott Card, Deaver Teague and the group he is traveling with meet with Sam Monson, the governor of Deseret. In the short story "The Fringe" the main character is a teacher named Mr. Carpenter who discovers that some of the men in town are stealing from the rest of the people and reports it to the authorities.

== Influences ==
As with much of Card's other literature, a Christian/Mormon influence is present in this story.

== Characters ==
- Mr. Carpenter - narrator
- Sam Monson - becomes governor of Deseret
- Anamari Boagente - Indian from Brazil
- Baniwa villagers - unnamed
- little girl with palsy - unnamed
- Sam's father - unnamed
- Sam's mother - unnamed
- Baniwa hunter - unnamed
- oil company employees - unnamed
- chopper pilot - unnamed
- two American Indian men - unnamed
- Quetzalcoatl - Sam and Anamari's son
