= Pageant Wagon (short story) =

- Short story by Orson Scott Card
- Country: United States
- Language: English

Publication
- Published in: The Folk of the Fringe
- Publisher: Phantasia Press
- Media type: Print (Hardcover & Paperback)
- Publication date: 1989

Chronology
Salvage (short story)	—

"Pageant Wagon" is a short story by American writer Orson Scott Card. It first appeared his in his short story collection The Folk of the Fringe (April, 1989), and was followed by a release in Isaac Asimov's Science Fiction Magazine (August, 1989)

== Plot summary ==
In a post-apocalyptic America, range rider Deaver Teague is trying to get to the town of Moab because his horse died. On the way, he is picked up by the Aal family’s pageant wagon. When they arrive in the town of Hatchville, Deaver decides to help the Aals set up for the show because he likes them, he wants to see the show, and because they have a beautiful daughter named Katie. Over the course of the day, Deaver learns that the family has a lot of problems. The most serious of them is that the middle son, Ollie, wants desperately to get away from the pageant because his father won’t let him act - making him run the lights and sound board instead. When Ollie takes off with a local girl in an effort to get the family into trouble, Deaver talks the sheriff out of arresting anyone and then offers to take over Ollie’s job so that he can either leave the show or start acting.

== Connection to other stories in the series ==
In Card's story "West", Deaver Teague was found by a group of traveling Mormons after his parents were killed. Since the boy had no parents the group decided to take him along with them to Utah. At the time, he was unable to talk and they didn’t know his name so he was named after two of the men in the group; Jamie Teague and Brother Deaver. In the story "Salvage", Deaver is a young man who goes diving in a Mormon temple to try to find hidden gold. In the short story "The Fringe", the main character, Mr. Carpenter is rescued from drowning at the last minute by a group of traveling actors calling itself the "Sweetwater Miracle Pageant".

== Influences ==
As with many of Card's other literature, a Christian/Mormon influence is present in this story.

== Characters ==
=== Main character ===
- Deaver Teague

=== Sweetwater Miracle Pageant people ===
- Marshall "Marsh" Aal - father
- Scarlett Aal - mother
- Peter O'Toole "Tooilie" Aal - son
- Katie Hepburn Aal - daughter
- Laurence Olivier "Ollie" Aal - son
- Janie Aal - daughter
- Dusty Aal - son
- Parley Aal - grandfather
- Donna Aal - grandmother

=== Other characters ===
- Royal "Roy" Aal - from Royal's Riders
- town's people - unnamed
- Meech - range rider dispatcher
- secretary - in the mayor's office - unnamed
- Mayor of Hatchville - also the bishop - unnamed
- Nance Pulley
- Judge Pulley - Nance's father
- sheriff - unnamed

== See also ==
- List of works by Orson Scott Card
- Orson Scott Card
- LDS fiction
- "Pageant Wagon" by Orson Scott Card
- "West" by Orson Scott Card
- "Salvage" by Orson Scott Card
- "The Fringe" by Orson Scott Card
