= Domiciano =

The term Domiciano may refer to:

- The Latin name of Domitian (51 – 96 AD), a Roman Emperor of the Flavian dynasty
- Domiciano Cavém (1932 – 2005), a Portuguese footballer
- Liriel Domiciano (b. 1981), a Brazilian singer
- Domiciano Santana, one of the founders of the Brazilian city Avaré

== See also ==
- Domitian (disambiguation)
