= Elaine S. Dalton =

American Mormon leader

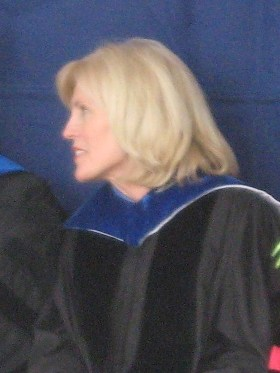
- Dalton at BYU Commencement in April 2008

13th Young Women General President
- 2008 – 2013
- Called by: Thomas S. Monson
- Predecessor: Susan W. Tanner
- Successor: Bonnie L. Oscarson

First Counselor in the Young Women General Presidency
- 2007 – 2008
- Called by: Susan W. Tanner
- Predecessor: Julie B. Beck
- Successor: Mary N. Cook

Second Counselor in the Young Women General Presidency
- 2002 – 2007
- Called by: Susan W. Tanner
- Predecessor: Sharon G. Larsen
- Successor: Mary N. Cook

Personal details
- Born: Elaine Schwartz; November 1, 1946 (age 79); Ogden, Utah, United States
- Alma mater: Brigham Young University
- Spouse(s): Stephen E. Dalton (m. 1968)
- Children: 6
- Website: Elaine S. Dalton

Elaine Schwartz Dalton (born November 1, 1946) was the thirteenth president of the Young Women organization of the Church of Jesus Christ of Latter-day Saints (LDS Church) from 2008 to 2013.

Dalton was born in Ogden, Utah. She earned a degree in English from Brigham Young University (BYU).

== LDS Church service ==
At the LDS Church's October 2002 general conference, Dalton, who had been serving on the Young Women General Board, was sustained as the second counselor to Susan W. Tanner, the newly-called general president of the Young Women organization. On March 31, 2007, Dalton became Tanner's first counselor when former first counselor Julie B. Beck was released to become the general president of the church's Relief Society. When Tanner was released on April 5, 2008, Dalton succeeded her as the president of the organization. Dalton's counselors were Mary N. Cook and Ann M. Dibb.

In 2009, Dalton spoke at the student body of BYU at their weekly devotional with an address entitled, "Zion Is the Pure in Heart". Dalton has spoken and written on the topics of modesty, chastity, and temples.

In early 2013, Dalton was criticized by some women in the church who were advocating greater church responsibilities for women (including receiving the priesthood). Consistent with current terms of service for church auxiliary presidencies, Dalton and her counselors were released at the April 2013 LDS Church general conference, with Bonnie L. Oscarson succeeding Dalton.

== Personal life ==
She married Stephen E. Dalton in the Salt Lake Temple on September 13, 1968 and they are the parents of six children. She is an avid runner and has completed more than 15 marathons.

In July 2013, Dalton was appointed as a member of the Board of Trustees of Utah Valley University and from 2015 to 2019 served as the chair.

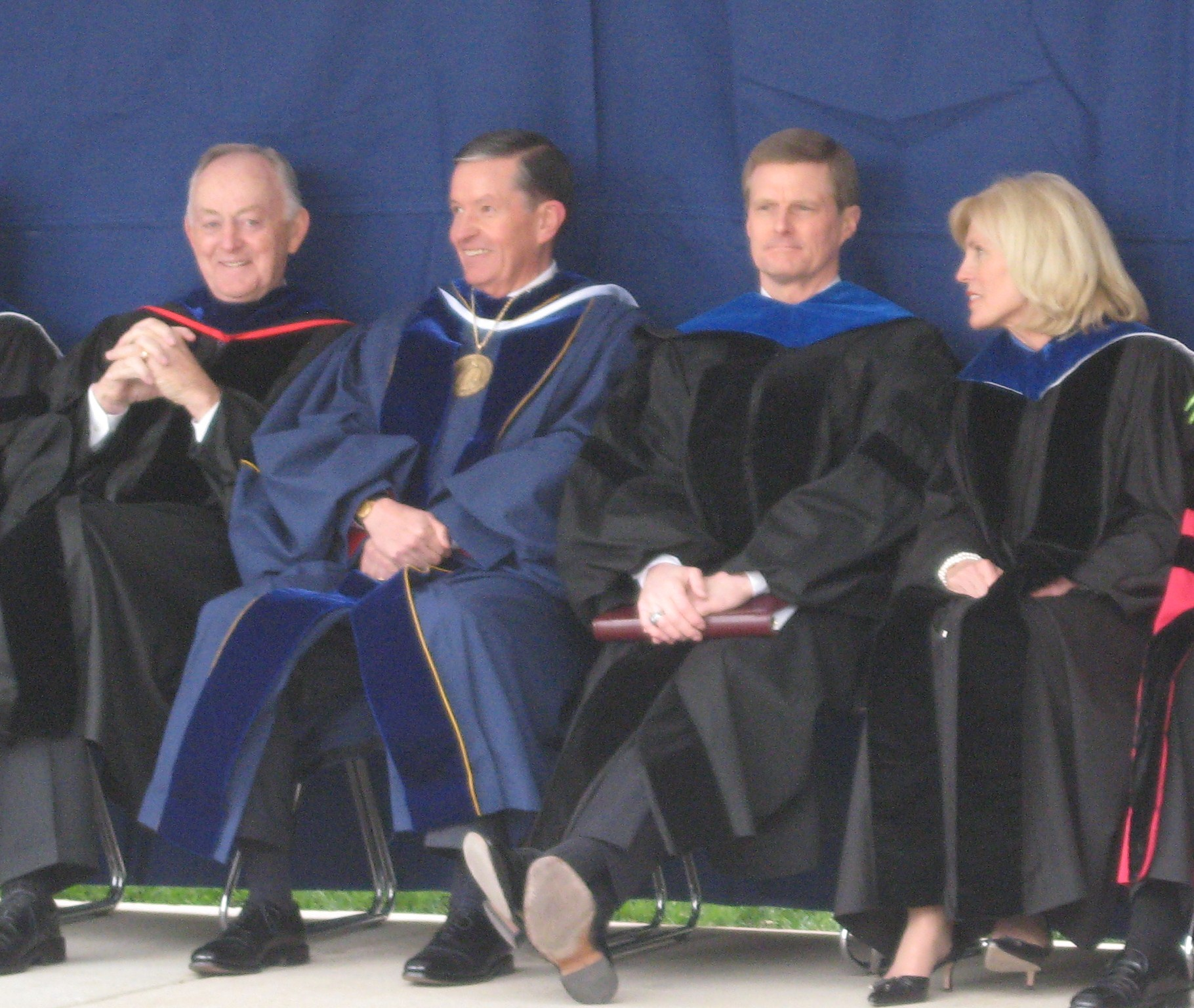
Dalton at the April 2008 BYU Commencement with Cecil O. Samuelson, W. Rolfe Kerr, and David A. Bednar.

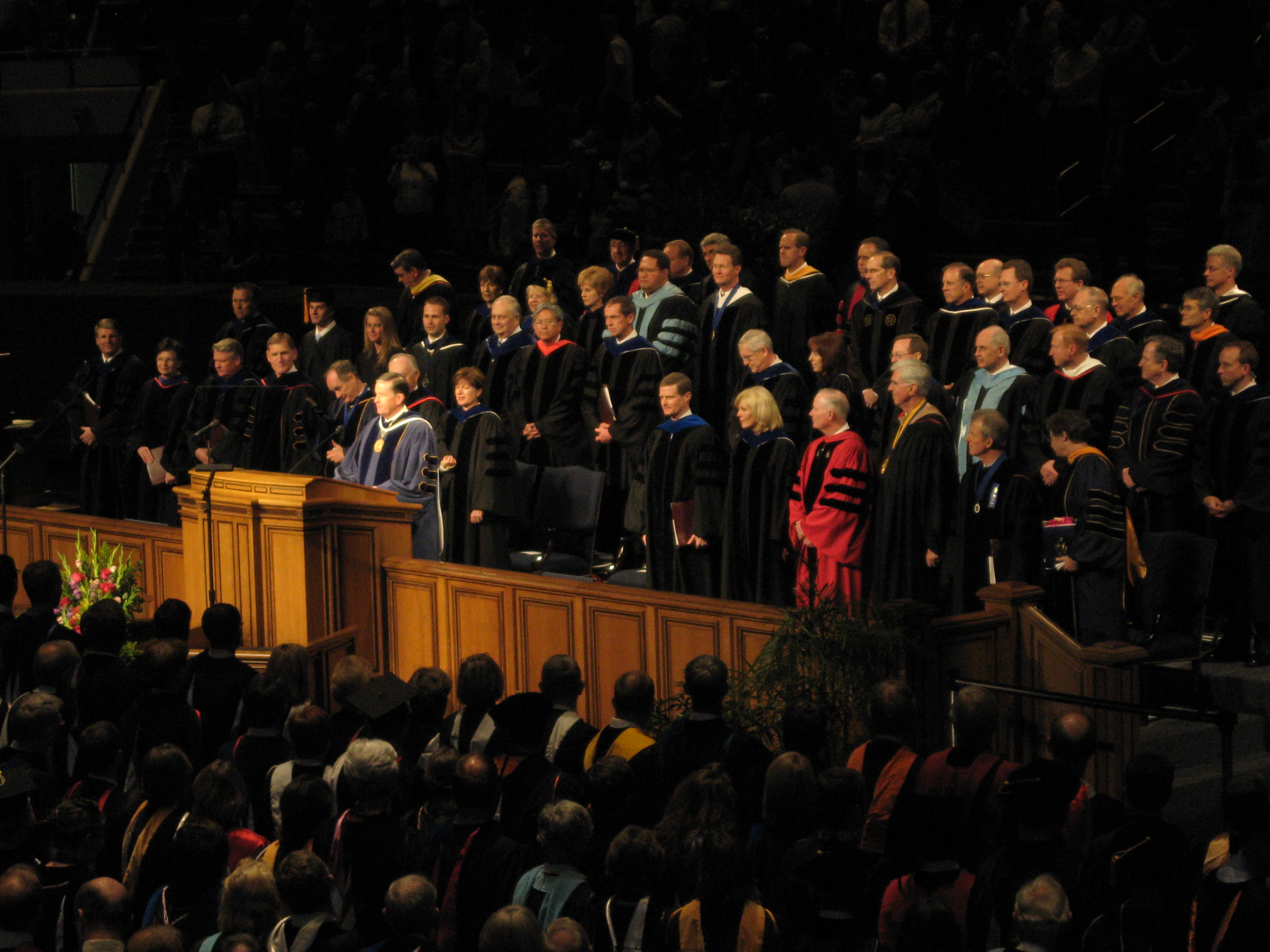
Dalton at the April 2008 BYU graduation ceremony

== Bibliography ==
- Shine (Deseret Book Company, 4 April 2016) ISBN 978-1609072247
- No Ordinary Women: Making a Difference through Righteous Influence (Deseret Book Company, 1 August 2016) ISBN 978-1629721514
- A Return to Virtue (Deseret Book Company, 20 March 2018) ISBN 978-1629724751

The Church of Jesus Christ of Latter-day Saints titles
Preceded by Susan W. Tanner	Young Women General President; 2008-2013	Succeeded by Bonnie L. Oscarson
Preceded by Julie B. Beck	First Counselor in the Young Women General Presidency; 2007–2008	Succeeded by Mary N. Cook
Preceded by Sharon G. Larsen	Second Counselor in the Young Women General Presidency; 2002–2007	Succeeded by Mary N. Cook
