= Mary N. Cook =

Mary Nielsen Cook

First Counselor in the Young Women General Presidency
- April 5, 2008 – April 6, 2013
- Called by: Elaine S. Dalton
- Predecessor: Elaine S. Dalton
- Successor: Carol F. McConkie

Second Counselor in the Young Women General Presidency
- March 31, 2007 – April 5, 2008
- Called by: Susan W. Tanner
- Predecessor: Elaine S. Dalton
- Successor: Ann M. Dibb

Personal details
- Born: Mary Nielsen; June 8, 1951 (age 75); Midvale, Utah
- Alma mater: Brigham Young University
- Spouse(s): Richard E. Cook
- Children: 4 (stepchildren)

Mary Nielsen Cook (born June 8, 1951) was a counselor in the general presidency of the Young Women organization of the Church of Jesus Christ of Latter-day Saints (LDS Church) from 2007 to 2013. She served as second counselor to Susan W. Tanner, with Elaine S. Dalton as first counselor, from March 2007 until April 2008. In April 2008, Dalton succeeded Tanner as Young Women General President and selected Cook as her first counselor.

Born in Midvale, Utah, Mary Nielsen earned undergraduate and graduate degrees from Brigham Young University in audiology, speech pathology, and education. In her professional career, she was a school administrator and a special education teacher.

On July 16, 1988, Nielsen married Richard E. Cook, whose first wife had died in 1984. Richard Cook would later serve as a general authority of the LDS Church from 1997 to 2001.

In the early 1990s, the Cooks served in Mongolia as LDS Church missionaries. In July 1995, when the church created the Mongolia Ulaanbaatar Mission, Richard Cook was asked to be the first mission president. Cook served with her husband in Mongolia until 1998. The Cooks later lived in Hong Kong, China while Richard served as a member of the presidency of the church's Asia Area.

On March 31, 2007, during the church's annual general conference, Cook was accepted as second counselor to Tanner in the Young Women General Presidency. In April 2008, Dalton succeeded Tanner as Young Women General President and selected Cook as her first counselor. She was released in April 2013, when Dalton's term ended and the presidency was reorganized.

Cook has no biological children, but is the stepmother to Richard Cook's four children.

== Speeches and publications ==
- Mary N. Cook, “Strengthen Home and Family,” Liahona, November 2007, pp. 11–13
- Richard E. Cook and Mary N. Cook, "Mongolia", Religious Liberty and the Global Church: The Challenge of Sharing, Seventh Annual Conference of the International Society (Provo, Utah: David M. Kennedy Center, Brigham Young University) 1996-08-19
- Catherine D. Montgomery and Mary N. Cook, "'Teach Me to Know': Cultivating Teaching Skills", Rise to the Divinity within You, Brigham Young University Women's Conference, (Provo, Utah: Brigham Young University) 2006-05-04

== Notes ==
The Church of Jesus Christ of Latter-day Saints titles
| Preceded by Elaine S. Dalton | First Counselor in the Young Women General Presidency; April 5, 2008-April 6, 2013 | Succeeded by Carol F. McConkie |
| Preceded by Elaine S. Dalton | Second Counselor in the Young Women General Presidency; March 31, 2007-April 5, 2008 | Succeeded by Ann M. Dibb |
