= Bonnie H. Cordon =

American church leader

15th Young Women General President
- March 31, 2018 – August 1, 2023
- Called by: Russell M. Nelson
- Predecessor: Bonnie L. Oscarson
- Successor: Emily Belle Freeman

Personal details
- Born: Bonnie Hillam; March 11, 1964 (age 62); Idaho Falls, Idaho, United States
- Education: Bachelor's degree
- Alma mater: Brigham Young University
- Spouse(s): Derek Lane Cordon (m. 1986)
- Parents: Harold Hillam, Carol Rasmussen
- Website: Bonnie H. Cordon

Bonnie H. Cordon (born March 11, 1964) was the fifteenth general president of the Young Women (YW) organization of the Church of Jesus Christ of Latter-day Saints (LDS Church) from 2018 to 2023. On October 13, 2023, Cordon was announced as the 10th president of Southern Virginia University, effective immediately.

Cordon was born in Idaho Falls, Idaho, to Harold G. Hillam and Carol Rasmussen and grew up on the family’s 80-acre farm. She attended Brigham Young University (BYU).

== LDS Church service ==
Cordon served as a full-time missionary in the Portugal Lisbon Mission. She served with her husband, Derek, while he was president of the Brazil Curitiba Mission from 2010 to 2013. She has also served in her ward and stake Primary, YW, and Relief Society organizations, and taught early morning seminary.

A new YW general presidency was announced on March 31, 2018, during the church's general conference. Cordon, along with her counselors, Michelle D. Craig and Becky Craven, replaced Bonnie L. Oscarson, Carol F. McConkie, and Neill F. Marriott. At the time of her call as YW General President, Cordon was serving as the first counselor in the Primary General Presidency. As of August 2019, Cordon has spoken once each in the church's General Women's Meeting or general conference, with titles of Trust in the Lord and Lean Not and Becoming a Shepherd.

In her assignment on the LDS Church's Missionary Executive Council, Cordon announced the rule change granting female missionaries permission to wear pants as part of their dress standard. In 2018 she visited Vanuatu in her YW's role. In 2019, she and Lisa L. Harkness, a member of the Primary General Presidency, visited the Democratic Republic of the Congo, Madagascar, South Africa, and Mozambique.

While Cordon was serving as the YW General President, the church announced changes to the YW program in October 2019, including the retirement of class names Beehive, Mia Maid, and Laurel; having local YW presidents reporting directly to the bishop; a new YW theme; there had also been a new activity program to replace Personal Progress announced previously. In 2019, Cordon participated in the first-ever 'Sister-to-Sister' question-and-answer worldwide live event as part of BYU's Women's Conference.

== Personal life ==
Cordon married Derek Lane Cordon on April 25, 1986, in the Salt Lake Temple and they are the parents of four children.

The Church of Jesus Christ of Latter-day Saints titles
Preceded by Bonnie L. Oscarson	Young Women General President; March 31, 2018 - August 1, 2023	Succeeded by Emily Belle Freeman
