= Solemn assembly =

Sacred LDS Church procedure

A solemn assembly is a formal and sacred procedure in the Church of Jesus Christ of Latter-day Saints (LDS Church) conducted to give added emphasis to the purpose of the occasion. Solemn assemblies are held at the dedications of temples and for specially-called meetings to provide instruction to church leaders. Solemn assemblies are also held for the purpose of sustaining a new church president, who church members consider to be a prophet, seer, and revelator. Such assemblies are held, in particular, to follow the law of common consent.

In 1831, a year after Joseph Smith established the Church of Christ, church members believe he was instructed by revelation to "call your solemn assembly, that your fastings and your mourning might come up into the ears of the Lord of Sabaoth." Members understand the practice to be a continuation of the Biblical solemn assemblies, held on special occasions of major religious importance in ancient Israel.

== Connected with temple dedications ==
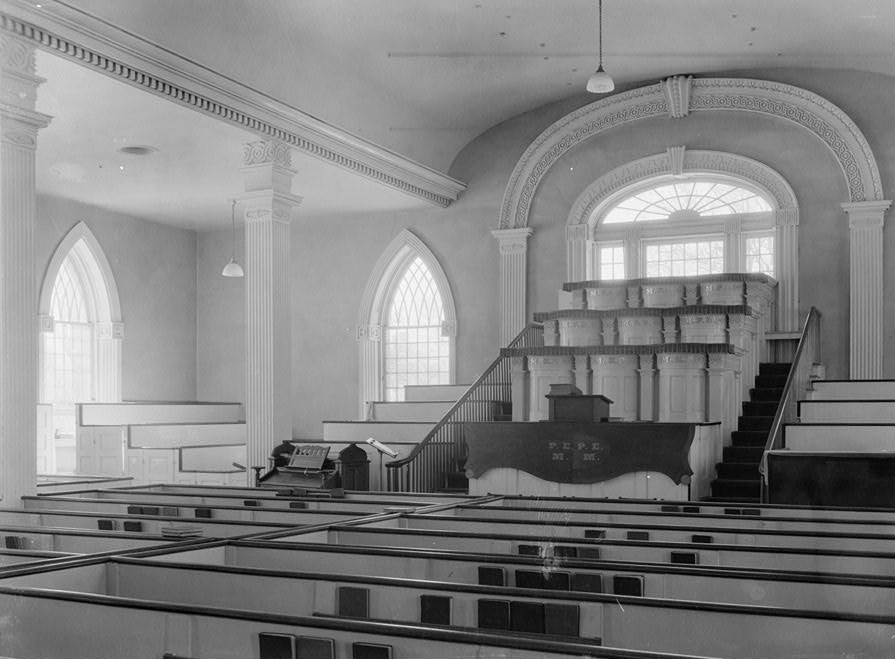
Interior of the Kirtland Temple, where the first Latter Day Saint solemn assembly was held in 1836

The first solemn assembly connected to a temple dedication in modern times was held on March 30, 1836, as part of the dedication of the Kirtland Temple, the first temple built in the Latter Day Saint movement. Prior to the dedication, Smith taught church members, "We must have all things prepared, and call our solemn assembly as the Lord has commanded us, that we may be able to accomplish His great work, and it must be done in God's own way. The House of the Lord must be prepared, and the solemn assembly called and organized in it, according to the order of the House of God." The dedication of the Kirtland Temple introduced many elements of solemn assemblies connected with temple dedications that are still used today, including the Hosanna Shout and the singing of "The Spirit of God Like a Fire Is Burning," a hymn written by W. W. Phelps. Solemn assemblies have been held in connection with the dedications of all LDS Church temples.

== Sustaining new church presidents ==
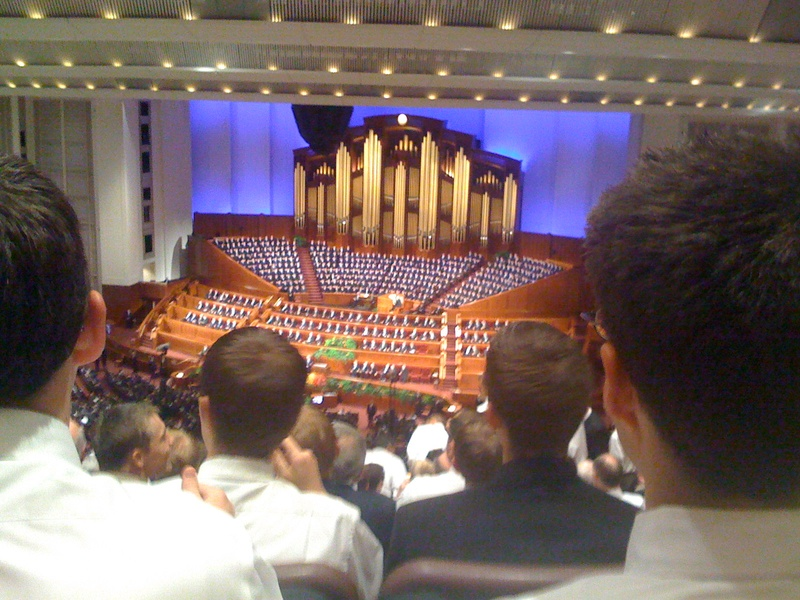
LDS General Conference at the Conference Center in 2008

At the first general conference after the death of a church president and the calling of his successor, the session at which the sustaining vote takes place is called a solemn assembly. During a solemn assembly, groups of church members are asked to stand in succession and sustain the new president, along with his counselors and the Quorum of the Twelve Apostles. Historically, the order of the sustaining groups has been: the First Presidency, the Quorum of the Twelve, the Quorums of Seventy and Presiding Bishopric, the remaining Melchizedek priesthood holders, Aaronic priesthood holders, and then all church members together. In more recent solemn assemblies, female church members aged 18 and older who constitute the Relief Society and female church members aged 12 to 18 who constitute the Young Women organization have been asked to stand and vote as distinct groups as well. The order of the April 2018 Solemn Assembly to sustain Russell M. Nelson was changed slightly. The sustaining by Melchizedek Priesthood holders was followed by the Relief Society, then the Aaronic Priesthood, the Young Women, and the church at large.

After the First Presidency votes, the other groups in turn, and then all the members of the church together, including those who have voted previously, are asked to stand wherever they may be at the time and vote in a single call to sustain, or oppose, the new president, along with his counselors and the Quorum of the Twelve. Until the spring general conference of 1973, solemn assemblies included a vote for the sustaining of the Patriarch to the Church (formerly Presiding Patriarch), which office was abolished in 1979. Local seventies were explicitly included as part of the Melchizedek Priesthood voting group as well, until the 1986 dissolution of local quorums of seventy at the stake level. The entire procedure until then had lasted a half hour, given that the voting had been done separately for each of the positions being called upon.

The sustaining vote of a solemn assembly is observed by general authorities at gatherings of church members at satellite locations on Temple Square, such as the Salt Lake Tabernacle and the Assembly Hall. The voting is observed by members of stake presidencies at local meetinghouses around the world, and observers are asked to invite those who oppose to meet with their stake president.

During the solemn assembly held on April 6, 1974, at which Spencer W. Kimball was sustained as the church's 12th president, N. Eldon Tanner described the purpose and deep spiritual meaning of such occasions for church members:

A solemn assembly, as the name implies, denotes a sacred, sober, and reverent occasion when the saints assemble under the direction of the First Presidency. Solemn assemblies are used for three purposes: the dedication of temples, special instruction to priesthood leaders, and sustaining a new President of the Church. This conference session today is a solemn assembly for the purpose of sustaining a newly called church president and other officers of the church. When we sustain the president of the church by our uplifted hand, it not only signifies that we acknowledge before God that he is the rightful possessor of all the priesthood keys; it also means that we covenant with God that we will abide by the direction and the counsel that come through His prophet. It is a solemn covenant.

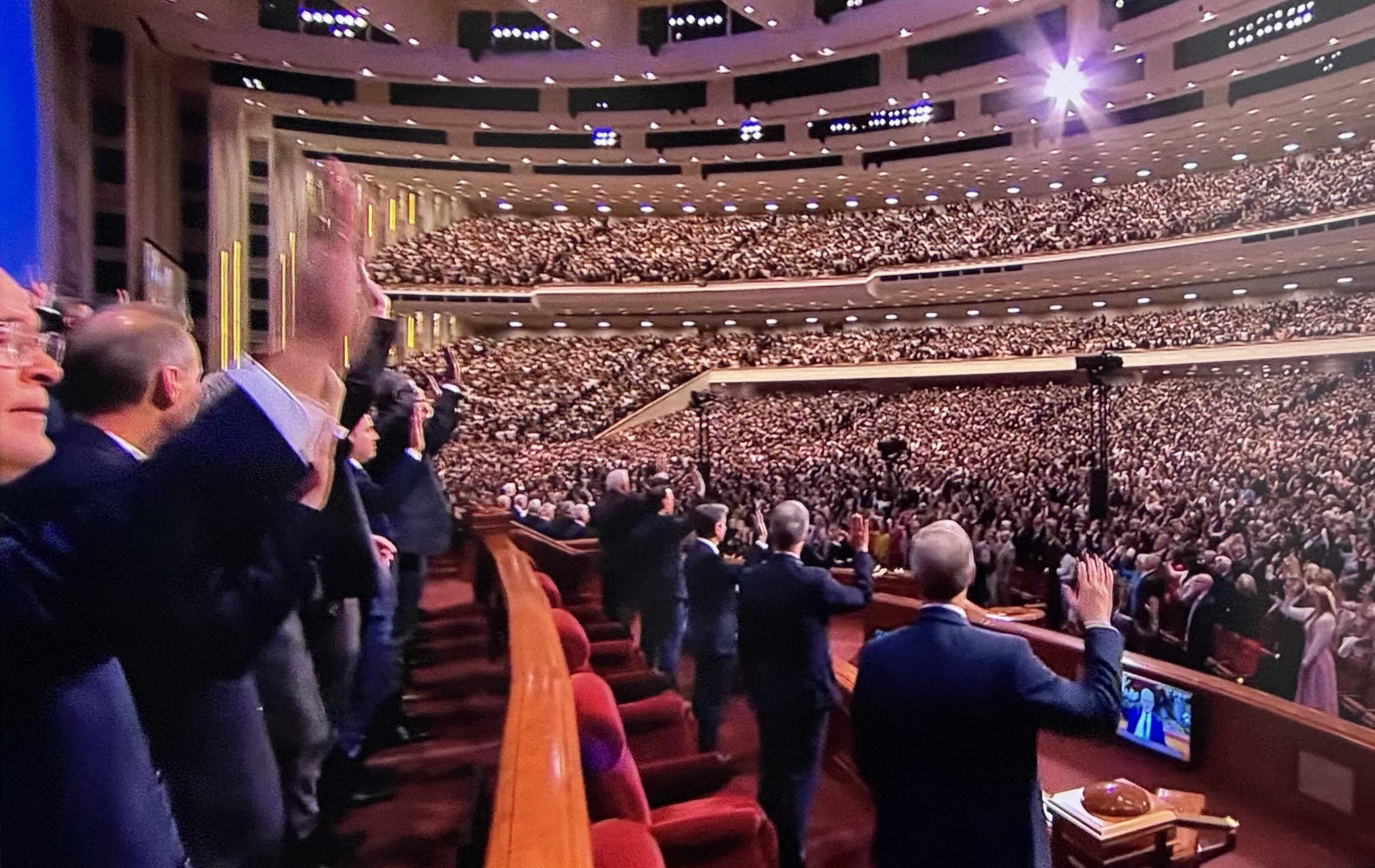
LDS Church members sustain Dallin H. Oaks as 18th church president at the Conference Center on April 4, 2026

Joseph Smith and his counselors in the original First Presidency were sustained in a solemn assembly in the Kirtland Temple on March 27, 1836, and Brigham Young was sustained in a solemn assembly on December 27, 1847, in the Kanesville Tabernacle in Council Bluffs, Iowa. The first solemn assembly sustaining to take place in the Salt Lake Tabernacle was on October 10, 1880, when John Taylor was sustained as the church's third president. Solemn assembly sustainings were held in the Salt Lake Tabernacle for the next twelve presidents of the church. The solemn assembly sustaining for Heber J. Grant, the 7th church president, was postponed to June 1, 1919, because of the worldwide flu pandemic in 1918-1919. Gordon B. Hinckley, the church's 15th president, was the last to be sustained in a solemn assembly in the Salt Lake Tabernacle on April 2, 1995. Subsequent solemn assembly sustainings have taken place in the Conference Center near Temple Square in Salt Lake City.

The most recent solemn assembly took place during the opening session of general conference on April 4, 2026, where Dallin H. Oaks was sustained as the church's 18th president. The business of the solemn assembly, including the sustaining of newly called apostles Gérald Caussé and Clark G. Gilbert, was conducted by D. Todd Christofferson, second counselor in the First Presidency.

This is the full list of solemn assemblies to sustain presidents of the LDS Church, with dates, church presidents, and locations:

- March 27, 1836 - Joseph Smith - Kirtland Temple, Kirtland, Ohio, USA
- December 27, 1847 - Brigham Young - Kanesville Tabernacle, Council Bluffs, Iowa, USA
- October 10, 1880 - John Taylor - Salt Lake Tabernacle, Salt Lake City, Utah, USA
- April 7, 1889 - Wilford Woodruff - Salt Lake Tabernacle, Salt Lake City, Utah, USA
- October 9, 1898 - Lorenzo Snow - Salt Lake Tabernacle, Salt Lake City, Utah, USA
- November 10, 1901 - Joseph F. Smith - Salt Lake Tabernacle, Salt Lake City, Utah, USA
- June 1, 1919 - Heber J. Grant - Salt Lake Tabernacle, Salt Lake City, Utah, USA
- October 5, 1945 - George Albert Smith - Salt Lake Tabernacle, Salt Lake City, Utah, USA
- April 9, 1951 - David O. McKay - Salt Lake Tabernacle, Salt Lake City, Utah, USA
- April 6, 1970 - Joseph Fielding Smith - Salt Lake Tabernacle, Salt Lake City, Utah, USA
- September 30, 1972 - Harold B. Lee - Salt Lake Tabernacle, Salt Lake City, Utah, USA
- April 6, 1974 - Spencer W. Kimball - Salt Lake Tabernacle, Salt Lake City, Utah, USA
- April 6, 1986 - Ezra Taft Benson - Salt Lake Tabernacle, Salt Lake City, Utah, USA
- October 1, 1994 - Howard W. Hunter - Salt Lake Tabernacle, Salt Lake City, Utah, USA
- April 2, 1995 - Gordon B. Hinckley - Salt Lake Tabernacle, Salt Lake City, Utah, USA
- April 5, 2008 - Thomas S. Monson - Conference Center, Salt Lake City, Utah, USA
- March 31, 2018 - Russell M. Nelson - Conference Center, Salt Lake City, Utah, USA
- April 4, 2026 - Dallin H. Oaks - Conference Center, Salt Lake City, Utah, USA

== Other occasions ==
Solemn assemblies have been held in the LDS Church on other occasions to emphasize instruction and counsel to church members, to commemorate special occasions, and to introduce new scripture. A solemn assembly was held on July 2, 1898, in the Salt Lake Temple where Lorenzo Snow, the church's 5th president, re-emphasized the need for church members to faithfully practice the law of tithing. A solemn assembly was held on April 5, 2020, to commemorate the 200th anniversary of Joseph Smith's theophany, known as the First Vision, and included a hosanna shout and singing of "The Spirit of God Like a Fire is Burning." This solemn assembly was conducted via broadcast from an almost empty auditorium in the Church Office Building in Salt Lake City because of restrictions on large gatherings during the global COVID-19 pandemic. Nearly all church members and leaders who participated in this solemn assembly did so virtually from their own residences.

== In ancient Israel ==
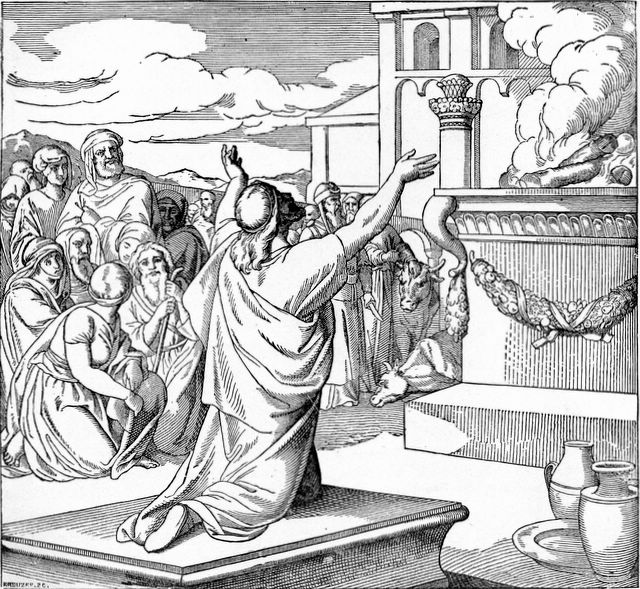
Solomon dedicates the temple

The Old Testament states that the people of Israel met in solemn assemblies on several occasions and for various purposes. A solemn assembly was most often held on the feast day at the end of Passover and the feast day at the end of the Feast of Tabernacles (Sukkot). Solemn assemblies in ancient Israel were also held for other special occasions, including at the dedication of Solomon's Temple. Joel wrote that solemn assemblies would be held in future times of great crisis. Joel's writings have been interpreted by some Christians, including the LDS Church, to be prophecies about events that will occur in the time just prior to the Second Coming of Jesus Christ. Solemn assemblies held in the LDS Church today are viewed as a part of the “restitution of all things, which God hath spoken by thy mouth of all his holy prophets since the world began” in the context of practices of ancient Israel (especially temple dedications), and as part of the fulfillment of Joel's prophecies.

== In other denominations ==
Other Christian denominations follow the Old Testament practice of holding solemn assembly gatherings. The reasons for these solemn assemblies vary, but typically involve renewing or strengthening adherents' relationship with Christ, closeness with God, or general feeling of holiness. These gatherings are not usually connected to formal procedural events like sustainings and dedications, but are more similar to the occasional solemn assemblies used in the LDS Church for instruction and worship.
