= Virginia H. Pearce =

American religious leader

First Counselor in the Young Women General Presidency
- April 4, 1992 – October 4, 1997
- Called by: Janette Hales Beckham
- Predecessor: Jayne B. Malan
- Successor: Carol B. Thomas

Personal details
- Born: Virginia Hinckley; February 8, 1945 (age 80)
- Spouse(s): James R. M. Pearce (m. 1965; died 2009)
- Children: 6
- Parents: Gordon B. Hinckley; Marjorie Pay

Virginia Hinckley Pearce (born February 8, 1945) is an author and was a member of the Young Women General Presidency of the Church of Jesus Christ of Latter-day Saints (LDS Church) from 1992 to 1997. She is the daughter of the church's 15th president, Gordon B. Hinckley.

At the church's April 1992 general conference, Pearce was sustained as first counselor to Young Women general president Janette C. Hales. She served in this capacity until 1997, when Hales was released and replaced by Margaret D. Nadauld. Pearce is a member of the board of directors of Deseret Book, a company owned by the LDS Church.

Pearce is the author and coauthor of multiple books. In 1965, she married James R. M. Pearce (died 2009) and they had six children.

== Publications ==
- Virginia H. Pearce (2013). Extending Forgiveness (Salt Lake City: Deseret Book)
- Sheri L. Dew and Virginia H. Pearce (2012). The Beginning of Better Days: Divine Instruction to Women from the Prophet Joseph Smith (Salt Lake City: Deseret Book) ISBN 978-1-60641-851-2
- Virginia H. Pearce (2011). Through His Eyes: Rethinking What You Believe About Yourself (Salt Lake City: Deseret Book) ISBN 1-60641-242-6
- Virginia H. Pearce (2006). A Heart Like His: Making Space for God's Love in Your Life (Salt Lake City: Deseret Book) ISBN 1-59038-544-6
- Virginia H. Pearce (2003). Creating Terrific Talks (Salt Lake City: Deseret Book) ISBN 1-57008-949-3
- Kathleen H. Barnes and Virginia H. Pearce (2002). I Love to See the Temple (Salt Lake City: Bookcraft) ISBN 1-57008-792-X
- Kathleen H. Barnes and Virginia H. Pearce (2001). Prayer Time (Salt Lake City: Bookcraft) ISBN 1-57345-954-2
- Kathleen H. Barnes and Virginia H. Pearce (2000). Sacrament Time (Salt Lake City: Bookcraft) ISBN 1-57345-590-3
- Virginia H. Pearce (1999). Glimpses into the Life and Heart of Marjorie Pay Hinckley (Salt Lake City: Deseret Book) ISBN 1-57345-523-7
- Virginia H. Pearce (1999). Classic Talk Series: Ward and Branch Families/The Ordinary Classroom (Salt Lake City: Shadow Mountain) ISBN 1-57345-511-3
- Virginia H. Pearce (1999). The Power of Remembering audio cassette. (Salt Lake City: Deseret Book) ISBN 1-57345-594-6
- Kathleen H. Barnes and Virginia H. Pearce (1975). What Is a Miracle? (Salt Lake City: Deseret Book) ISBN 9780877475446

== See also ==
- Patricia P. Pinegar : another counselor to Hales

The Church of Jesus Christ of Latter-day Saints titles
Preceded by Jayne B. Malan	First Counselor in the Young Women General Presidency; April 4, 1992-1997	Succeeded by Carol B. Thomas
