= D. Todd Christofferson =

American religious leader (born 1945)

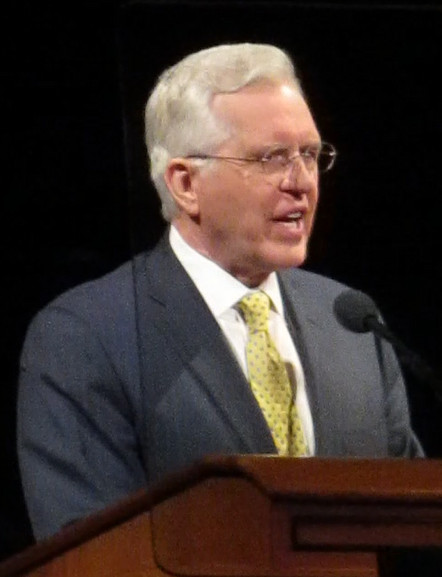

Second Counselor in the First Presidency
- October 14, 2025
- Called by: Dallin H. Oaks
- Predecessor: Henry B. Eyring

Quorum of the Twelve Apostles
- April 5, 2008 – October 14, 2025
- Called by: Thomas S. Monson
- End reason: Called as Second Counselor in the First Presidency

LDS Church Apostle
- April 10, 2008
- Called by: Thomas S. Monson
- Reason: Death of Gordon B. Hinckley; reorganization of First Presidency

Presidency of the Seventy
- August 15, 1998 – April 5, 2008
- Called by: Gordon B. Hinckley
- End reason: Called to the Quorum of the Twelve Apostles

First Quorum of the Seventy
- April 3, 1993 – April 5, 2008
- Called by: Ezra Taft Benson
- End reason: Called to the Quorum of the Twelve Apostles

Personal details
- Born: David Todd Christofferson; January 24, 1945 (age 81); American Fork, Utah, U.S.
- Education: Brigham Young University (BA); Duke University (JD)
- Spouse(s): Katherine Jacob (m. 1968)
- Children: 5

David Todd Christofferson (born January 24, 1945) is an American religious leader and former lawyer who serves as second counselor in the First Presidency of the Church of Jesus Christ of Latter-day Saints (LDS Church). He served as a member of the Quorum of the Twelve Apostles from 2008 to 2025. He has been a church general authority since 1993. Christofferson is currently the sixth most senior apostle in the church.

Christofferson grew up in Utah and New Jersey, and after high school served an LDS Church mission in Argentina. He then studied English literature at Brigham Young University (BYU) before attending law school at Duke University. After graduating from law school in 1972, Christofferson was a law clerk to Judge John Sirica of the U.S. District Court for the District of Columbia while Sirica presided over much of the legal proceedings stemming from the Watergate scandal. Christofferson then entered private practice and eventually became an in-house corporate lawyer.

== Early life and education ==
Christofferson was born on January 24, 1945, in American Fork, Utah. He grew up in Pleasant Grove, Utah, Lindon, Utah, and Somerset, New Jersey. As a young man, he served a two-year LDS Church mission in Argentina. His mission president was Richard G. Scott, with whom Christofferson would later serve in the Quorum of the Twelve Apostles. After his mission, he graduated from BYU in 1969 with a Bachelor of Arts in English literature and international relations. He then attended the Duke University School of Law, where he was an editor of the Duke Law Journal. He graduated in 1972 with a Juris Doctor.

== Legal and professional career ==
After graduating from law school, Christofferson was a law clerk to Judge John Sirica of the U.S. District Court for the District of Columbia from 1972 to 1974. Soon after Christofferson began his clerkship, Sirica was assigned to preside over the Watergate legal proceedings. Sirica and Christofferson were the first outside the White House to hear the Nixon White House tapes. "Judge Sirica and I were shocked as we heard Nixon calmly ask how much money it would take to keep the Watergate burglars quiet," Christofferson said in a June 2017 address to faculty and students at Christ Church College in Oxford, England. "The judge and I couldn't believe, didn't want to believe what we were hearing … He passed me a note suggesting we rewind the tape and listen again. Up to this point we both still hoped that the president [of the United States] was not really involved, but this was indisputable."

At the conclusion of his clerkship, Christofferson spent a year as an active duty member of the U.S. military. He then spent several years in private practice at the Washington, D.C. law firm Dow Lohnes (now part of Cooley LLP) before becoming an in-house legal counsel for a healthcare corporation and for several banking companies. At the time of his call as an LDS general authority in 1993, Christofferson worked in Charlotte, North Carolina, as an associate general counsel for NationsBank (now Bank of America).

== Personal life ==
Christofferson married Katherine Jacob in the Salt Lake Temple on May 28, 1968. They are the parents of five children.

== LDS Church service ==
Prior to becoming a general authority, Christofferson served in the LDS Church as a bishop, stake president, and regional representative. At the church's April 1993 general conference, Christofferson was called as a general authority and member of the First Quorum of the Seventy. In August 1998, Christofferson became a member of the Presidency of the Seventy.

As a seventy, Christofferson served as the executive director of the church's Family and Church History Department. While in this position he was involved in negotiations with Jewish leaders on policies on temple work for Holocaust victims, which concluded with the church stating that its members should only do such temple work for family members. He also was in charge of the department when the church completed the Freedman's Savings Bank Records project.

On April 5, 2008, during the solemn assembly session of the church's general conference when Thomas S. Monson was sustained as church president, Christofferson was sustained as a member of the Quorum of the Twelve Apostles.

On October 14, 2025, Christofferson was announced as the new second counselor to church president Dallin H. Oaks in the First Presidency, with Henry B. Eyring serving as first counselor. As a member of the First Presidency, Christofferson is regarded by church members as a prophet, seer, and revelator.

== Works ==
Articles

- —— (Spring 2004), "Lest we forget: the meaning of Kirtland's history in the present", Journal of Mormon History, 30 (1), Mormon History Association: 104–119, OCLC 367833284
- —— (July 15, 2008), "An Oral History Interview with Elder D. Todd Christofferson" (PDF), The Richard Nixon Presidential Library and Museum, interviewed by Naftali, Timothy J.

== Honors ==
- World Peace Prize (2017)

== Notes ==
The Church of Jesus Christ of Latter-day Saints titles
Preceded by Henry B. Eyring	Second Counselor in the First Presidency; October 14, 2025 - present	Succeeded by Incumbent
Preceded by Quentin L. Cook	Quorum of the Twelve Apostles; April 5, 2008 – October 14, 2025	Succeeded by Neil L. Andersen
