= Bonnie L. Oscarson =

14th Young Women General President
- April 6, 2013 – March 31, 2018
- Called by: Thomas S. Monson
- Predecessor: Elaine S. Dalton
- Successor: Bonnie H. Cordon

Personal details
- Born: Bonnie Lee Green; October 23, 1950 (age 75); Salt Lake City, Utah, United States
- Education: Bachelor's degree
- Alma mater: Brigham Young University
- Spouse(s): Paul K. Oscarson (m. 1969) (until his death)
- Children: 7
- Parents: Theo James and Jean Green
- Website: Bonnie L. Oscarson

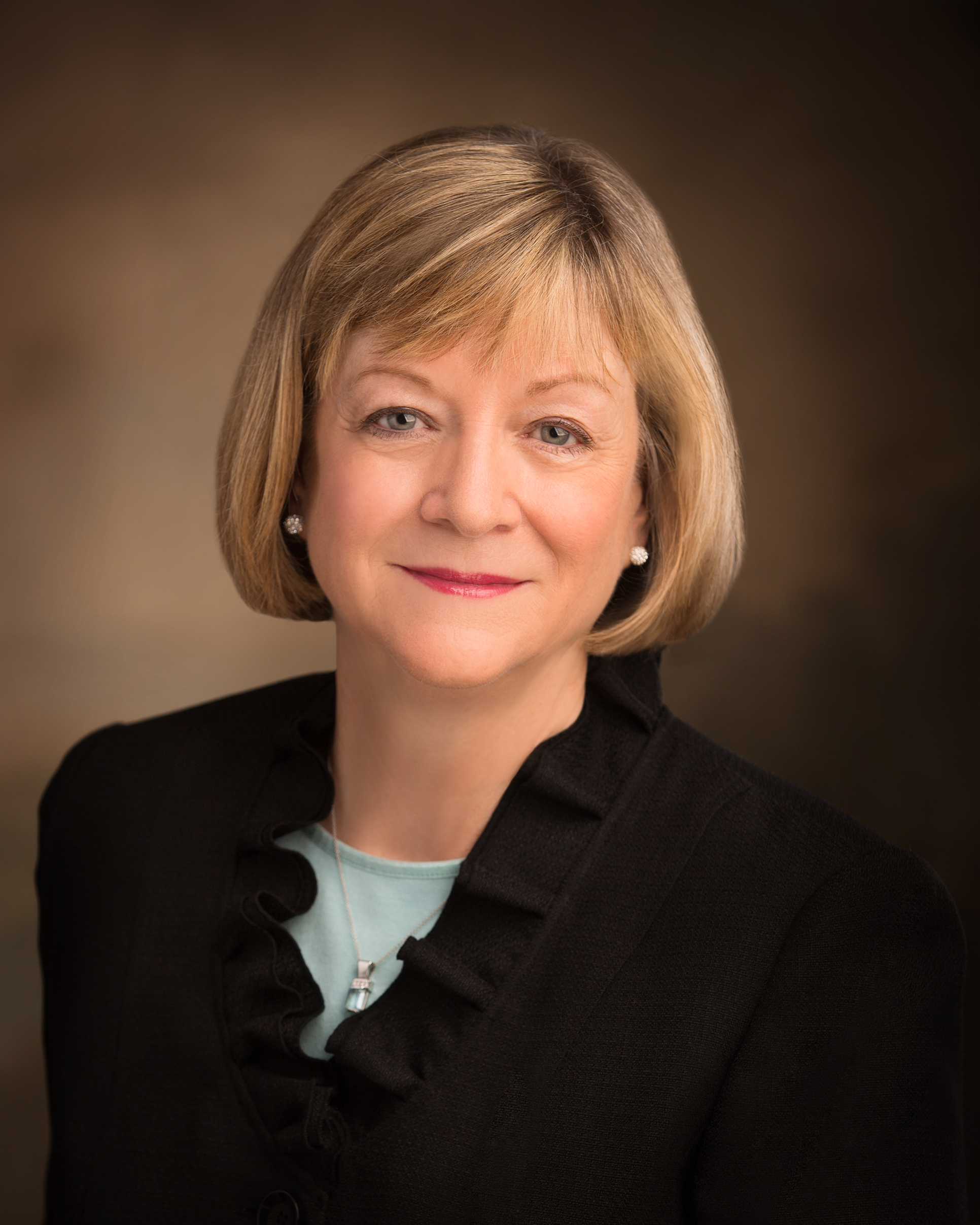
Bonnie L. Oscarson

Bonnie Lee Green Oscarson (born October 23, 1950) was the fourteenth president of the Young Women organization of the Church of Jesus Christ of Latter-day Saints (LDS Church) from 2013 to 2018.

Bonnie Lee Green was born in Salt Lake City, Utah to Theo James Green and Jean Stringham. Oscarson earned a bachelor's degree, with an emphasis in British and American Literature, from Brigham Young University. For many years she lived in St. Louis, Missouri.

== LDS Church service ==
Oscarson lived in Sweden from 1976 to 1979, where she served with her husband while he was president of the church's Sweden Gothenburg Mission, and again from 2009 to 2012 when she and her husband served as matron and president of the Stockholm Sweden Temple. She is fluent in Swedish. She has lived in New Jersey, Massachusetts, and Texas, where her husband was the first president of the Klein Texas Stake.

At the church's April 2013 general conference, Oscarson was sustained as the new general president of the Young Women organization, succeeding Elaine S. Dalton. Oscarson's appointment as general president of the Young Women was welcomed by church members in the St. Louis area. As president of the Young Women, Oscarson is an ex officio member of the church's Boards of Trustees/Education.

In 2015, Oscarson became the first female member of the LDS Church's Missionary Executive Council. These three committees "are immensely important in deciding how budgets are delegated, how programs and products are prioritized, and how church business moves forward," explained Neylan McBaine in a Washington Post article.

Oscarson was released at the church's April 2018 general conference and was succeeded by Bonnie H. Cordon.

== Personal life ==
Oscarson married Paul K. Oscarson in 1969 in the Salt Lake Temple. They have seven children. Her husband was born and raised in St. Louis. Her husband's father, Roy W. Oscarson, was the first LDS Church stake president in St. Louis.

== Notes ==
The Church of Jesus Christ of Latter-day Saints titles
Preceded by Elaine S. Dalton	Young Women General President; April 6, 2013 – March 31, 2018	Succeeded by Bonnie H. Cordon
