= Sharon G. Larsen =

American Mormon leader

Second Counselor in the Young Women General Presidency
- 1997 – 2002
- Called by: Janette C. Hales
- Predecessor: Carol B. Thomas
- Successor: Elaine S. Dalton

Personal details
- Born: February 6, 1939 (age 86); Glenwood, Alberta, Canada
- Alma mater: University of Alberta; Brigham Young University
- Spouse(s): Ralph T. Larsen
- Children: 2

Sharon Greene Larsen (born February 6, 1939) served as the second counselor to Margaret D. Nadauld in the General Presidency of the Young Women of the Church of Jesus Christ of Latter-day Saints (LDS Church) from 1997 to 2002.

Larsen was born and raised in Glenwood, Alberta, Canada. Larsen studied at the University of Alberta and then at Brigham Young University (BYU) where she earned a degree in elementary education. She taught school in St. Louis, Missouri and in Davis County, Utah.

In the LDS Church, Larsen served in a variety of callings in the Young Women and Relief Society as well as a seminary and institute teacher.

Larsen is married to Ralph T. Larsen and they are the parents of two children. Ralph is a dentist.

The Church of Jesus Christ of Latter-day Saints titles
Preceded by Carol B. Thomas	Second Counselor in the Young Women General Presidency; 1997–2002	Succeeded by Elaine S. Dalton
