= Neill F. Marriott =

Mormon leader (born 1947)

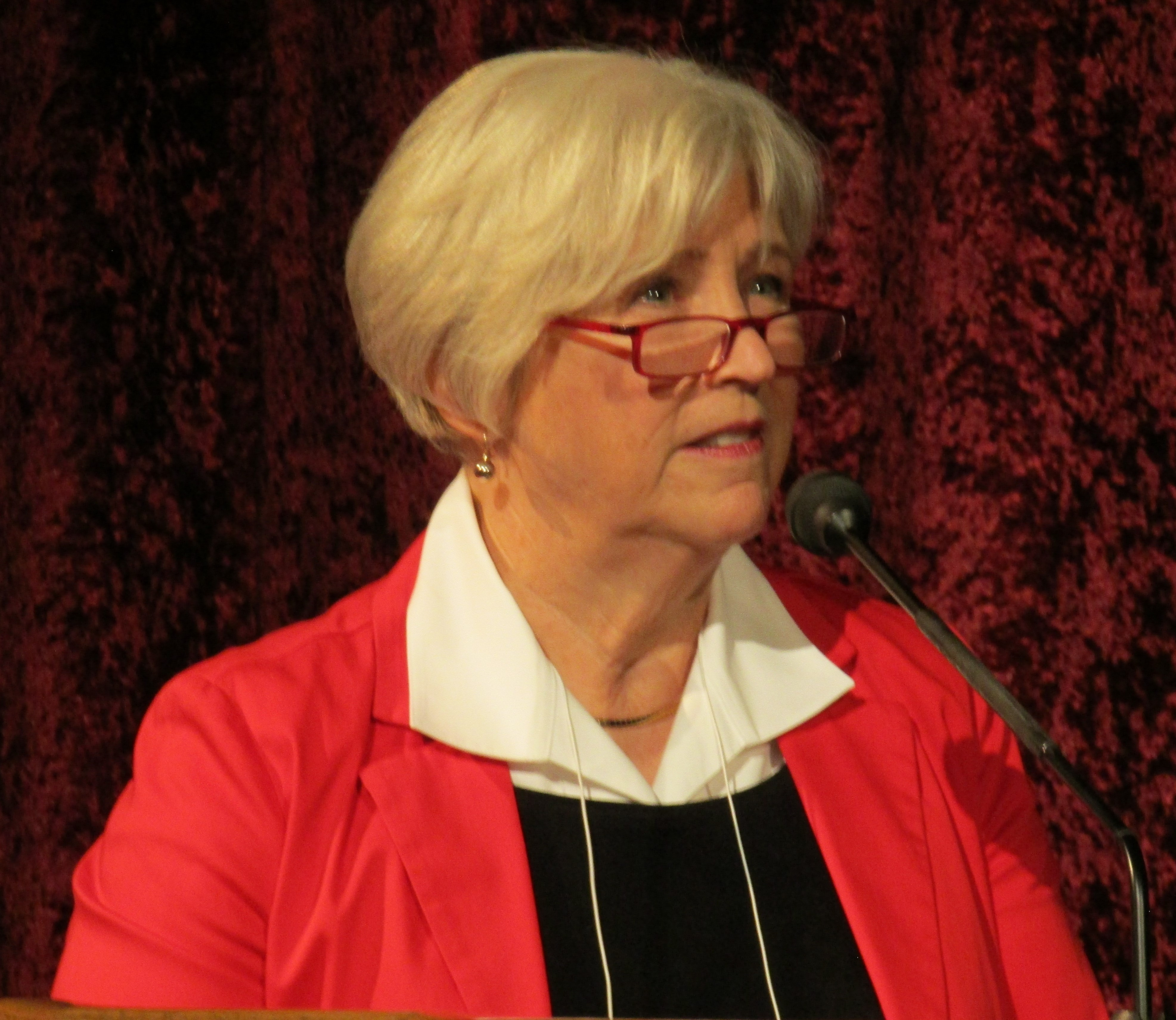
- Neill F. Marriott in 2018

Second Counselor in the Young Women General Presidency
- April 2013 – March 2018
- Called by: Bonnie L. Oscarson
- Predecessor: Ann M. Dibb
- Successor: Becky Craven

Personal details
- Born: Evelyn Neill Foote; October 16, 1947 (age 79); Alexandria, Louisiana, United States
- Alma mater: Southern Methodist University
- Spouse(s): David Marriott
- Children: 11

Evelyn Neill Foote Marriott (born October 16, 1947) is an American religious leader, who was the second counselor in the general presidency of the Young Women organization of the Church of Jesus Christ of Latter-day Saints (LDS Church) from 2013 to 2018.

== Personal life ==
She was born in Alexandria, Louisiana, has a degree in English literature from Southern Methodist University, and later worked as a secretary at Harvard University.

While at Harvard, she met David Marriott, who introduced her to the LDS Church. She was baptized into the LDS Church and about a year later began dating Marriott. They were married in the Salt Lake Temple in June 1971 and are the parents of 11 children.

== LDS Church service ==
Among other callings in the church, Marriott has served as a stake and ward Relief Society president and ward Young Women president. From 2002 to 2005, Marriott served with her husband while he was president of the church's Brazil São Paulo Interlagos Mission.

In 2013, Marriott was called as the second counselor to Bonnie L. Oscarson in the Young Women general presidency. Carol F. McConkie was first counselor, and they served until 2018. Marriott spoke in the church's General Women's Meeting three times and once in general conference included Abiding in God and Repairing the Breach and Yielding Our Hearts to God. Marriott was serving when the church changed to a General Women’s Meeting, the first time that women, young women, and girls were invited to meet together, rather than holding separate annual Young Women and Relief Society meetings. In April 2015, the General Women's Meeting officially became the General Women's Session of general conference, though that format was later changed.

In February 2015, Marriott participated with other LDS Church leaders at a press conference in favor of bills protecting people from housing and employment discrimination based on sexual orientation, while also addressing the need for protection of religious liberty. Marriott was also one of the church's representatives announcing a bill incorporating these principles being introduced to the Utah legislature in March 2015. In 2018, she presented at the International Center for Law and Religion Studies conference a talk entitled, What Can a Lay Person Do to Protect Religious Freedom? and spoke about her father, a judge, attorney, and member of the board at the First Methodist Church in Alexandria, Louisiana.

The Church of Jesus Christ of Latter-day Saints titles
| Preceded by Ann M. Dibb | Second Counselor in the Young Women General Presidency; April 2013 to March 2018 | Succeeded by Becky Craven |
