= Richard E. Cook =

American Church of Jesus Christ of Latter Day Saints leader (1930–2024)

Second Quorum of the Seventy
- April 5, 1997 – October 6, 2001
- Called by: Gordon B. Hinckley
- End reason: Honorably released

Personal details
- Born: Richard Ernest Cook; September 7, 1930; Pleasant Grove, Utah, U.S.
- Died: May 1, 2024 (aged 93); Salt Lake City, Utah, U.S.

Richard Ernest Cook (September 7, 1930 – May 1, 2024) was an American who served as a general authority of the Church of Jesus Christ of Latter-day Saints (LDS Church) from 1997 to 2001. He was also the chief financial officer for the Perpetual Education Fund. He was married to Mary N. Cook, who had served in general presidency the LDS Church's Young Women organization. Cook was the LDS Church's first mission president in Mongolia.

== Biography ==
Cook was born in Pleasant Grove, Utah, on September 7, 1930. He received a bachelor's degree from Brigham Young University and an MBA from Northwestern University. Cook spent most of his career as a financial executive with Ford Motor Company. He married Clea Searle in 1950 and they had four children. She died in 1984. He then married Mary Nielsen in 1988.

Cook served in the LDS Church as a counselor in the presidency of the Bloomfield Hills Michigan Stake. In the mid-1990s, Cook and his wife, Mary, went to Mongolia to serve as LDS Church missionaries. He later served as the first mission president in Mongolia. He was a member of the church's Second Quorum of the Seventy from 1997 to 2001. During much of this time he served in the presidency of the church's Asia Area.

From 2001 to 2012, Cook served as the chief financial officer of the Perpetual Education Fund. On October 13, 2023, Ambassador Batbayar Ulziidelger presented Cook with the Order of the Polar Star.

Cook died in Salt Lake City on May 1, 2024, at the age of 93.

== Sources ==
- “Elder Richard E. Cook Of the Seventy,” Ensign, May 1997, p. 103
- Deseret News 2008 Church Almanac (Salt Lake City, Utah: Deseret Morning News, 2007) pp. 103, 422–423
