= Mormon Miracle Pageant =

Former Latter Day Saint theatrical performance

- Written by: The Church of Jesus Christ of Latter-day Saints
- Subject: Book of Mormon, First Vision, Mormon pioneers
- Genre: Religion
- Setting: South lawn of Temple Hill, Manti Temple, Manti, Utah

Premiere
- Date: 1967
- Official website

The Mormon Miracle Pageant was a Latter-day Saint pageant held in Manti, Utah, until it was discontinued in 2019. An annual outdoor theatrical performance, it was produced by an amateur cast of over five hundred members of the Church of Jesus Christ of Latter-day Saints (LDS Church). The nightly program took place on the south lawn of temple hill at the Manti Temple, usually in June. The two-week pageant would typically draw an average of 15,000 people per night over an eight-night performance.

The 2019 pageant was the final full-scale event of its type, as part of a church-wide directive to make church events more focused on home and family and discourage all large-scale productions.

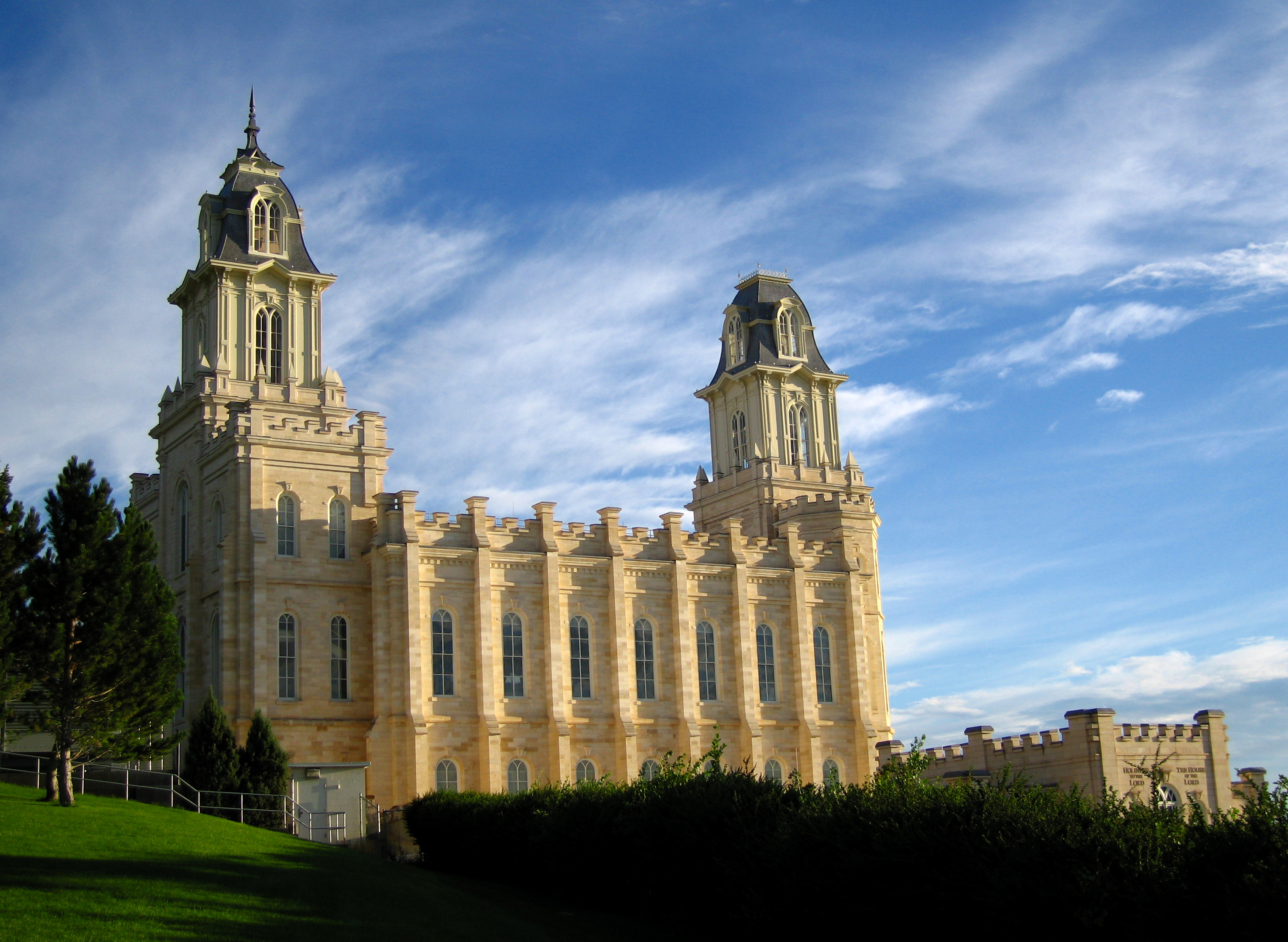
The Pageant was held on a hill adjacent to the Manti Temple.

== Content ==
For LDS Church members, the pageant was a faith-promoting family event. The pageant portrayed the relationship and chronology of three separate, but related, faith-promoting accounts. Opening with the experiences of the church's first president, Joseph Smith, during his young-adulthood in the burned-over district of New York in the 1820s. Including the recovery and translation of the Book of Mormon, the restoration of the "Church of Christ" in 1830 (which was renamed "The Church of Jesus Christ of Latter-day Saints" in 1838) and its infancy, and the death of Smith in 1844. During the dramatization of the translation of the Book of Mormon an overview of its contents it presented. The wars and contentions of the native Israelite inhabitants of North America are represented, along with their teachings of Jesus Christ, leading to his post-resurrection appearance in the first century A.D. The pageant concludes with the persecution of the Mormon pioneers in the East and their subsequent exodus to Utah, led by the church's second president, Brigham Young, and the group of pioneers sent to central Utah (now Sanpete Valley), where the Manti Utah Temple stands.

The performance began shortly after sunset, during the early summer (usually late June), with people often arriving several hours before the performance. In addition to restaurants in the town, there were special food stands for the event. Light security was provided at the performance site and the surrounding streets to ensure general order and to direct traffic.

== History ==
The pageant was first produced by the Manti Utah Stake in 1967 under the leadership of stake president Vernon Kunz. Helen and Morgan Dyreng of Manti, parents of past Young Women General President Margaret D. Nadauld, directed the production. Duane and Martha Ryan were the narrators. Although simple and unpolished in comparison to the pageant in later years, the performance was accompanied by a 25-piece orchestra. The original music directors were McLoyd Erickson, Harry A. Dean, and Evan Bean. Among the orchestra members was Richard Nibley (brother of Hugh Nibley), who had trained most of the rest of the musical group. The original script was based on the 1950 book The Mormon Miracle written by Grace Leora Johnson.

== Pageant evangelists and protesters ==
There were usually several evangelical Christian church groups, who would attempt to proselytize the largely Latter-day Saint attendees prior to the nightly event. These evangelists would typically hand out anti-Mormon (or pro-Evangelicalism) literature and engage pageant-goers in religious discussion as they would approach the site. Some evangelists would carry picket signs and wear "overtly anti-Mormon t-shirts." In addition, some local "fundamentalist Mormon" groups were known to carry picket signs in the approach area, criticizing the LDS Church's position on polygamy and abortion; the LDS Church abandoned the practice of polygamy in the 19th century, and believes that abortion should be allowed only in rare cases, such as rape or incest.

== See also ==
- List of pageants of The Church of Jesus Christ of Latter-day Saints
- Temple (LDS Church)
