= Margaret D. Nadauld =

American church leader

16th Young Women General President
- October 4, 1997 – October 6, 2002
- Called by: Gordon B. Hinckley
- Predecessor: Janette C. Hales
- Successor: Susan W. Tanner

Personal details
- Born: Margaret Dyreng; November 21, 1944 (age 80); Manti, Utah, United States
- Education: B.S. in speech and English, 1967
- Alma mater: Snow College, Brigham Young University
- Spouse(s): Stephen D. Nadauld (m. 1968)
- Children: 7 sons
- Parents: R. Morgan and Helen B. Dyreng

Margaret D. Nadauld (born November 21, 1944) was the eleventh general president of the Young Women organization of the Church of Jesus Christ of Latter-day Saints (LDS Church) from 1997 to 2002. She is also a lifelong advocate of motherhood and family.

== Biography ==
Margaret Dyreng was born and raised in Manti, Utah, and is the daughter of Helen and Morgan Dyreng, the original directors of the Mormon Miracle Pageant. She attended Snow College before transferring and graduating from Brigham Young University (BYU), where she was active in student government and dramatic productions. Following graduation, she taught high school English in Salt Lake City and Boston.

In 1968, she married Stephen D. Nadauld in the Manti Temple. The couple settled in Utah to raise their seven sons. In the church, she has as president of the Relief Society, Young Women, and Primary in her ward, and as stake Primary president.

Stephen Nadauld served as a General Authority Seventy from 1991 until 1996. One year after the end of his service, church president Gordon B. Hinckley called Margret Nadauld to serve as the Young Women General President.

== LDS Church service ==
=== Young Women general president ===
Nadauld was called as Young Women general president on October 4, 1997, during the church's general conference. Nadauld, along with her counselor Sharon G. Larsen, replaced general president Janette C. Hales, and her counselor Virginia H. Pearce, with Carol B. Thomas continuing as a counselor.

Nadauld's assignments included service on the Church Educational System's Board of Education and Boards of Trustees, traveling to 55 countries, and many other church-wide committees. She participated in the creation of the church's 8,400 acre Heber Valley Girls Camp, designed to host 6,000 girls per week, the church's largest such camp. In 1999, while serving as Young Women general president, Nadauld was a delegate and speaker at the World Congress of Families II, in Geneva, Switzerland.

Major events during Nadauld's presidency included:

- 1998: Young Women worldwide celebration, “Turning Hearts to the Family."
- 2000: Final Young Women worldwide celebration, “Stand as a Witness.”
- 2002: For the Strength of Youth revised.
- 2002: Annual Mutual theme reinstated.
- 2002: Young Women Personal Progress program revised to be more international and new Young Womanhood recognition medallion introduced.
- 2002: Words “strengthen home and family” added to the Young Women Theme.

Nadauld and her counselors were released on October 5, 2002.

=== General conference addresses ===
Nadauld spoke eight times in general conferences and the associated annual general Young Women meetings. Notable themes of her talks included being strong, standing for what one knows is right, a young woman's stewardship over her body, the magnificent blessing of womanhood, and confidence through understanding God's divine plan.

=== Other church activities ===
Nadauld has been a commencement speaker at Ensign College, a university devotional and commencement speaker at BYU, and a university devotional speaker at BYU-Idaho.

Following her service as Young Women general president, Nadauld and her husband were called as church leaders for the Switzerland Geneva Mission. After that, she was again called as a ward Relief Society president.

In 2011, Nadauld was honored for her service as Young Women General President.

In 2015, Nadauld commented favorably on the church's policy change to include women leaders as permanent members of more leading councils in the church.

== Other civic activities ==
Nadauld was first lady of Weber State College from 1985 to 1990 during the school's transition to university status. Later, Nadauld was first lady of Dixie State College from 2008 to 2014, during its transition to university status as Dixie State University, now Utah Tech University. Margaret and Stephen Nadauld endow a scholarship at the university.

In 1991 Nadauld was the Utah Vice President for American Mothers, Inc. which awards the Utah and National Mother of the Year honors. Nadauld later served as the Utah President of the Freedoms Foundation at Valley Forge, responsible for recognizing citizens for exemplary acts of service and promotion of freedoms.

== Selected works ==
=== Books ===
- Nadauld, Margaret D. (2001). Write back soon! letters of love and encouragement to young women. Salt Lake City, Utah: Bookcraft. ISBN 978-1-57345-955-6.
- ——— (2004). A Mother's Influence: Raising Children to Change the World. Salt Lake City, Utah: Deseret Book. ISBN 978-1-59038-239-4.

=== Speeches ===
- Nadauld, Margaret D. (April 1998). "Come unto Christ".
- ——— (April 1998). "Turning Hearts to the Family".
- ——— (April 1999). "Follow the Light".
- ——— (April 2000). "Stand as a Witness".
- ——— (October 2000). "The Joy of Womanhood".
- ——— (April 2001). "A Comforter, a Guide, a Testifier".
- ——— (April 2002). "Hold High the Torch".
- ——— (October 2002). "A Woman of Faith".

The Church of Jesus Christ of Latter-day Saints titles
Preceded by Janette C. Hales	Young Women General President; 1997 - 2002	Succeeded by Susan W. Tanner
