= Emily Belle Freeman =

American church leader

16th Young Women General President
- August 1, 2023
- Called by: Russell M. Nelson
- Predecessor: Bonnie H. Cordon

Personal details
- Born: Emily Belle Oswald; December 31, 1969 (age 56); Boston, Massachusetts, United States
- Alma mater: Brigham Young University (attended); University of Utah (attended); BYU-Idaho (attended)
- Spouse(s): Gregory Garth Freeman (m. 1989)
- Parents: McKinley McVichie Oswald and Leslie Anne (James) Oswald

Emily Belle Freeman (née Oswald; born December 31, 1969) is the sixteenth Young Women general president of the Church of Jesus Christ of Latter-day Saints (LDS Church). She has served in the role since August 2023.

== Early life and career ==
Born Emily Belle Oswald in Boston, Massachusetts, she was raised in Sandy, Utah, by parents McKinley McVichie Oswald and Leslie Anne (James) Oswald. Her parents were called to lead the California Ventura Mission during her senior year of high school. She has taken classes at Brigham Young University (pre-nursing major), the University of Utah, and BYU-Idaho (university studies), but has not earned a degree.

Freeman is the author of over twenty published books, including the bestselling "The Ten Virgins." She has also spoken at a variety of conferences, workshops and gatherings. She taught for many years in the Church Educational System.

In 2022, Utah Valley Magazine named Freeman "Person of the Year" for her approach to connection amidst challenges.

== LDS Church service ==
Freeman previously served as the president of both the Young Women and Relief Society organizations in her local ward.

A new Young Women general presidency was announced on April 1, 2023, during the church's general conference. On August 1, Freeman, along with her counselors, Tamara W. Runia and Andrea Muñoz Spannaus, replaced Bonnie H. Cordon, Michelle D. Craig, and Becky Craven.

As of July 2026, Freeman has spoken three times in general conference:

- An October 2023 address was entitled "Walking in Covenant Relationship with Christ."
- An October 2024 talk was entitled "Live Up to Your Privileges."
- An April 2026 talk was entitled "Best Days and Worst Days."

== Personal life ==
Freeman married Gregory Garth Freeman in the Los Angeles California Temple on December 19, 1989. They are the parents of five children, including taking in and unofficially adopting one of Greg's high school lacrosse players, Garett Bolles, who has lived as one of the family since that time. Bolles has played professional football for the Denver Broncos since 2017. Bolles compares his experience to the film, The Blind Side.

== Publications ==
- Emily Belle Freeman (2003). 12 Steps to Build Your Own Personal ARK (Salt Lake City, Utah: Sound Concepts) ISBN 9781887938662
- —— (2006). The Ten Virgins: Ten Women, Ten Stories, Ten Lessons for Our Day (Salt Lake City, Utah: Deseret Book) ISBN 9781590386224
- —— (2011). Love Life and See Good Days (Salt Lake City, Utah: Deseret Book) ISBN 9781609070083
- —— (2013). Written on Our Hearts (Salt Lake City, Utah: Deseret Book) ISBN 9781609075842
- —— (2014). The Peter Potential (Salt Lake City, Utah: Deseret Book) ISBN 9781609078492
- —— (2014). Making It Through the Middle (Salt Lake City, Utah: Deseret Book) ISBN 9781609079208
- —— (2015). Celebrating a Christ-Centered Christmas: Seven Traditions to Lead Us Closer to the Savior (Salt Lake City, Utah: Deseret Book) ISBN 9781609078997
- —— (2015). Celebrating a Christ-Centered Easter: Seven Traditions to Lead Us Closer to the Savior (Salt Lake City, Utah: Deseret Book) ISBN 9781629720234
- —— (2016). The Woman at the Well (Salt Lake City, Utah: Deseret Book) ISBN 9781629722306
- —— (2016). Creating a Christ-Centered Home: 12 Teachings of Jesus to Strengthen Our Families (Salt Lake City, Utah: Deseret Book) ISBN 9781629722245
- —— (2018). More Than Just a Star (Salt Lake City, Utah: Deseret Book) ISBN 9781639930685
- —— (2018). Closer to Christ (Salt Lake City, Utah: Deseret Book) ISBN 9781629724652
- —— (2019). The Promise of Enough (Salt Lake City, Utah: Deseret Book) ISBN 9781629725925
- —— (2020). Don't Miss This in the Book of Mormon (with David Butler) (Salt Lake City, Utah: Deseret Book) ISBN 9781629727769
- —— (2020). Don't Miss This in the Doctrine and Covenants (with David Butler) (Salt Lake City, Utah: Deseret Book) ISBN 9781629729015
- —— (2021). Don't Miss This in the Old Testament (with David Butler) (Salt Lake City, Utah: Deseret Book) ISBN 9781629729510
- —— (2021). The Unexpected Deliverer (with David Butler) (Salt Lake City, Utah: Deseret Book) ISBN 9781629728773
- —— (2021). The Gathering Home: Creating a Refuge of Goodness and Joy (Salt Lake City, Utah: Deseret Book) ISBN 9781629728223
- —— (2022). Grace to Become (Salt Lake City, Utah: Deseret Book) ISBN 9781639930050
- —— (2022). Don't Miss This in the New Testament (with David Butler) (Salt Lake City, Utah: Deseret Book) ISBN 9781639930371
- —— (2023). From Grace to Charity (Salt Lake City, Utah: Deseret Book) ISBN 9781639931217

The Church of Jesus Christ of Latter-day Saints titles
Preceded by Bonnie H. Cordon	Young Women General President; August 1, 2023 - Current	Succeeded by Current
