= Julie B. Beck =

American religious leader

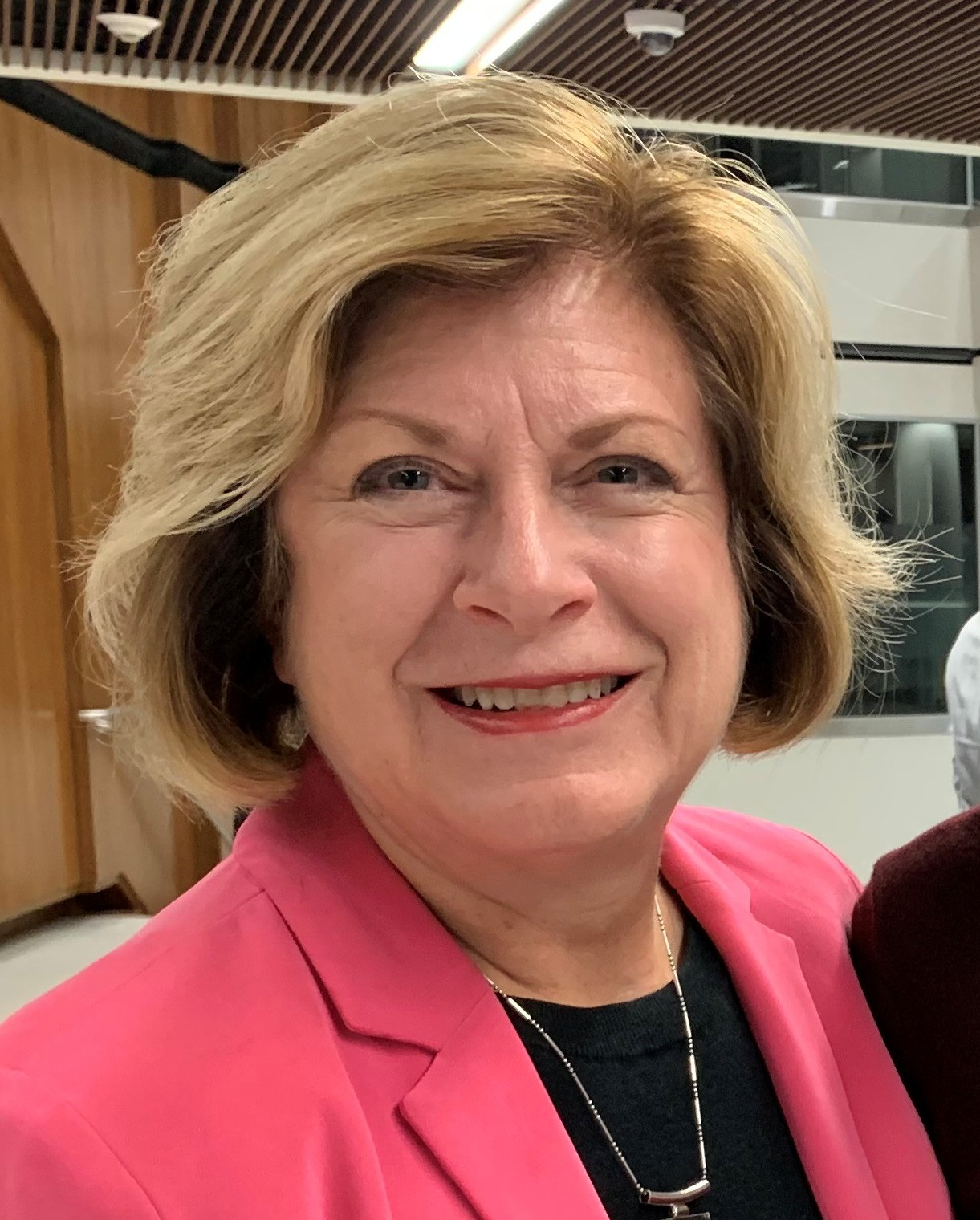

15th Relief Society General President
- March 31, 2007 – March 31, 2012
- Called by: Gordon B. Hinckley
- Predecessor: Bonnie D. Parkin
- Successor: Linda K. Burton

First Counselor in the Young Women General Presidency
- October 5, 2002 – March 31, 2007
- Called by: Susan W. Tanner
- Predecessor: Carol B. Thomas
- Successor: Elaine S. Dalton
- End reason: General President of the Relief Society

Personal details
- Born: Julie Bangerter; September 29, 1954 (age 71); Salt Lake City, Utah, United States
- Alma mater: Brigham Young University (BS)
- Spouse(s): Ramon P. Beck (1973–present)
- Children: 3

Julie Bangerter Beck (born September 29, 1954) was the fifteenth general president of the Relief Society of the Church of Jesus Christ of Latter-day Saints (LDS Church) from 2007 to 2012.

Born in Granger, Utah, to William Grant Bangerter and Geraldine Hamblin, Beck grew up in Utah and in São Paulo, Brazil, where her father served as a mission president for the LDS Church for five years. Beck's father would later serve as an LDS Church general authority. Beck is also the niece of Utah's thirteenth governor, Norman H. Bangerter, who held office from 1985 to 1993. Beck attended Dixie College and graduated from Brigham Young University with a degree in family science.

== LDS Church service ==
In October 2002, Beck was called as First Counselor to Susan W. Tanner in the Young Women general presidency of the LDS Church. Beck served in this capacity until 2007, when she succeeded Bonnie D. Parkin as the general president of the Relief Society.

Beck was the fifteenth general president of the Relief Society since its organization in 1842. In that assignment, Beck was an ex officio member of the Boards of Trustees/Education of the Church Educational System and was also a member of the executive committee of the Boards of Trustees/Education. Beck's two counselors were Silvia H. Allred and Barbara Thompson. The 2011 publication of the book Daughters in My Kingdom was described as the "crowning achievement" of Beck's five-year tenure. Beck was succeeded by Linda K. Burton.

=== Key addresses ===
At the church's October 2007 general conference, Beck delivered a sermon that caused controversy among some members of the church. In her sermon, Beck equated "nurturing" with "homemaking"—which Beck said "includes cooking, washing clothes and dishes, and keeping an orderly home"—and stated that "Latter-day Saint women should be the best homemakers in the world". A report issued a few days after Beck's speech stated that "she has caused a stir among Mormon women not seen since 1987, when President Ezra Taft Benson said unequivocally that mothers should not work outside the home except in emergencies."

Beck's second annual address to the church's women in September 2008 focused on strengthening the role of the Relief Society in each congregation throughout the world. The address was viewed as being more inclusive of single and childless women and was more enthusiastically received in the United States than previous addresses. During her time at the Church, Beck delivered 15 talks and estimated she spends between 100 and 150 hours preparing each talk. She writes that her presidency focused on "three simple concepts: faith, family and providing relief".

== Personal life ==
On December 28, 1973, she married Ramon P. Beck in the Salt Lake Temple and they are the parents of three children. In 2017 she was included in an article in The Atlantic about people with the name Julie Beck.

== Bibliography ==
- Joy in the Covenant (Deseret Book, 29 October 2018) ISBN 978-1629724683

The Church of Jesus Christ of Latter-day Saints titles
| Preceded by Bonnie D. Parkin | Relief Society General President; March 31, 2007 – March 31, 2012 | Succeeded by Linda K. Burton |
| Preceded by Carol B. Thomas | First Counselor in the Young Women General Presidency; October 5, 2002 – March 31, 2007 | Succeeded by Elaine S. Dalton |
