= June Conference =

Church Gathering

June Conference was an annual gathering of the Church of Jesus Christ of Latter-day Saints (LDS Church) for young men and women, as well as church leaders. It was held in Salt Lake City between 1888 and 1975, and included cultural festivals, training, and speeches by church leaders.

== Format ==
June Conference was held over three days. Youth planned and participated in workshops about ideas for teaching youth, as well as music, dancing, exhibits, and skits, often pertaining to a conference theme. There were also music and art festivals, banquets, camp activities, testimony meetings, and programs for both youth and parents. Youth leaders received training and learned the youth theme and program for the next year. Youth programs were often on break during summer, allowing some preparation before resuming in September. The all-Church dance festival was held at the University of Utah's Ute Stadium. The First Presidency and other General Authorities would speak at two general sessions of talks, including discussion of new youth programs.

== History ==
The first annual June Conference was held in 1888, replacing training conferences for YLMIA (later called the Young Women organization) that had been held at the time of general conference. Leaders gave training workshops in teacher improvement, music, activities, and story-telling. In 1896 the YMMIA (later called the Young Men organization) joined in the event.

=== Early features ===
Starting in 1904, the conference also included an athletic field day for various sports. In 1911 Field Day was incorporated into the conference activities, organizing outdoor games and sports. At the 1929 conference, a girl's summer camping program was launched, along with a unified magazine for both young men and young women. The conference was also known for its large dance festivals with up to 2000 participants, introduced in 1936. These large festivals would rival even the all-Church athletic competitions. These large-scale productions were the highlight for the year for the church's youth programs. At a time when nearly all LDS stakes were in the United States, about 80 percent of them sent representatives to June Conference in Salt Lake City.

=== Post-war growth ===
Over the years the conference continued to adapt and expand. During World War II, when gas-rationing limited travel, the conference was suspended, resuming in 1945. In 1946 a dance festival of three thousand celebrated the war's end. The following year, at the 1947 Utah pioneer centennial, the dance festival was moved to the University of Utah's Ute Stadium to accommodate the size of the event. In 1952, 30,000 spectators (thousands having been turned away) saw traditional, western, and Maori dances in the two-hour program. The music festival in 1949 was unusually large, with three thousand singers joining in the Salt Lake Tabernacle. To spare the growing Latter-day Saint population in California from traveling to Utah, similar conferences for youth were held in August in Los Angeles, from 1954 to 1957. The June Conference in 1969 was known for its elaborate events, international representatives, and debut of the film Pioneers in Petticoats, in honor of the YWMIA centennial.

=== Correlation changes ===
In 1971, the large-dance festival was replaced by regional festivals, with the June Conference festival limited to participants from Salt Lake City, and all-church athletic competitions were disbanded. As the church restructured its programs through correlation, the June Conference became a priesthood conference in 1973, integrating young men of the Aaronic priesthood with church president Harold B. Lee conducting.

=== Last conference ===
The final June Conference was held in 1975, at a time when the LDS Church was modernizing its growing, and increasingly international, auxiliaries. One year prior, in June 1974, annual churchwide conferences for the Primary, Sunday School, and Relief Society had also been discontinued. During this last conference, church president Spencer W. Kimball announced the conference would end as the church, experiencing increasing international growth, moved to decentralize. He emphasized that church leaders were realizing “the impracticality of concentrating our activities and learning processes in the headquarters center only.” Training and cultural activities for youth that the June Conference had once provided were instead to be conducted by local and regional church organizations. In part, this was also to encourage self-reliance and leadership within local areas. The next year, in summer 1976, BYU began the first annual Especially For Youth (EFY) event, intended to be like BYU Education Week for youth, where attendees could meet other youth from throughout the church, rather than just those at a local youth conference.

== See also ==
- General Conference (LDS Church)

== Sources ==
Embry, Jessie L. (2008), Spiritualized Recreation: Mormon All-Church Athletic Tournaments and Dance Festivals, Provo, UT: Charles Redd Center for Western Studies, Brigham Young University, OCLC 268966353, archived from the original on 2014-11-26
