= Perpetual Education Fund =

The Perpetual Education Fund (PEF) is a program of the Church of Jesus Christ of Latter-day Saints (LDS Church), first announced by church president Gordon B. Hinckley on March 31, 2001. The mission of the PEF, as stated in that address, is to provide educational opportunity (not welfare support) to members living in areas with widespread poverty, enabling and empowering them to lift themselves and establish their future lives on the foundation of self-reliance that can come from training in marketable skills. This program reflects the values and stated aims of the church around the importance of education and the duty to help and assist the poor. Anyone may donate.

== History ==
The LDS Church has made similar efforts in the past to provide for the temporal needs of its members. The program is modeled after the Perpetual Emigration Fund, which provided loans to more than 40,000 19th-century Latter-day Saint immigrants looking to settle in the Salt Lake Valley, but lacking the funds to do so. In 1903, the church established a fund to provide aspiring school teachers with loans for school expenses. A related effort, not specifically targeting education, began in 1936, when church president Heber J. Grant set up a welfare system in order to provide a means for people to earn a living during the Great Depression.

== Operation and administration ==
The Perpetual Education Fund functions as an endowment, meaning that all loans are made from interest, while the corpus (or body of the fund) remains intact. All donations made to the fund go to the fund corpus. Anyone may donate to the PEF, regardless of affiliation with the LDS Church, and donations have been made by members and non-members alike. Because the program is administered through the LDS Church, all donations go directly toward the loans. The executive director of the PEF from its inception through September 2012 was former general authority and Church Historian John K. Carmack, with Richard E. Cook, another former general authority, as the managing director. In September 2012, the church's First Presidency announced Robert C. Gay, of the First Quorum of the Seventy, as the new chairman of the fund.

The Perpetual Education Fund provides loans to members of the LDS Church seeking additional education, mainly through vocational school and technical training. In connection with the more recent PEF-B program, (and for those already part of the International Education Fund program) opportunities for university education are also available. In 2005, career training options requested included: school teacher, network administrator, computer science, systems analyst, human resource specialist, flight attendant, managerial, clinical lab technician, computer support technician, university faculty, political analyst, physician's assistant, physical and corrective therapy assistant, lawyer and judge.

Potential loan recipients first complete a short training program on personal finance, budgeting and career planning and work with a loan administrator to select viable vocational and educational options for their particular region. Recipients are encouraged to work, if possible, during their schooling to provide for their own living expenses. Loans for tuition and fees are paid directly by the fund to the educational institution, further reducing the potential for mismanagement. During the course of the loan, recipients make small, manageable payments and participate in regular progress reviews. PEF loans average about $800 and the average training program of a Perpetual Education Fund loan recipient lasts 2.6 years. More substantial payments on the loan begin 90 days after graduation and the loans are usually scheduled to be paid off, with a modest 3-4% interest, over the course of 2–6 years. Recipients are also encouraged to make further contributions to the fund as their circumstances allow. Loan repayments and subsequent donations are channeled back into the fund corpus, making it a truly "perpetual" resource.

== Progress ==
Less than 18 months after its inception, the PEF had disbursed more than 5,000 loans. Within three years (2004), approximately 10,000 young adults had received loans from the fund. By 2007, the numbers had climbed to 27,000 students in 39 different countries, and in late 2009, it was announced that over 40,000 people had received loans through the program.

The Perpetual Education Fund has made loans to students in more than 40 countries, including Bolivia, Brazil, Cambodia, Chile, Mexico, Mongolia, Peru, the Philippines, India, Fiji, Tonga, South Africa, Ghana, and Nigeria.

Starting in 2023, church members who specified the PEF as a donation recipient on their donation slips were told the fund was no longer accepting donations.

== See also ==
- Indian Placement Program
- LDS Philanthropies
