= Susan W. Tanner =

American Mormon leader

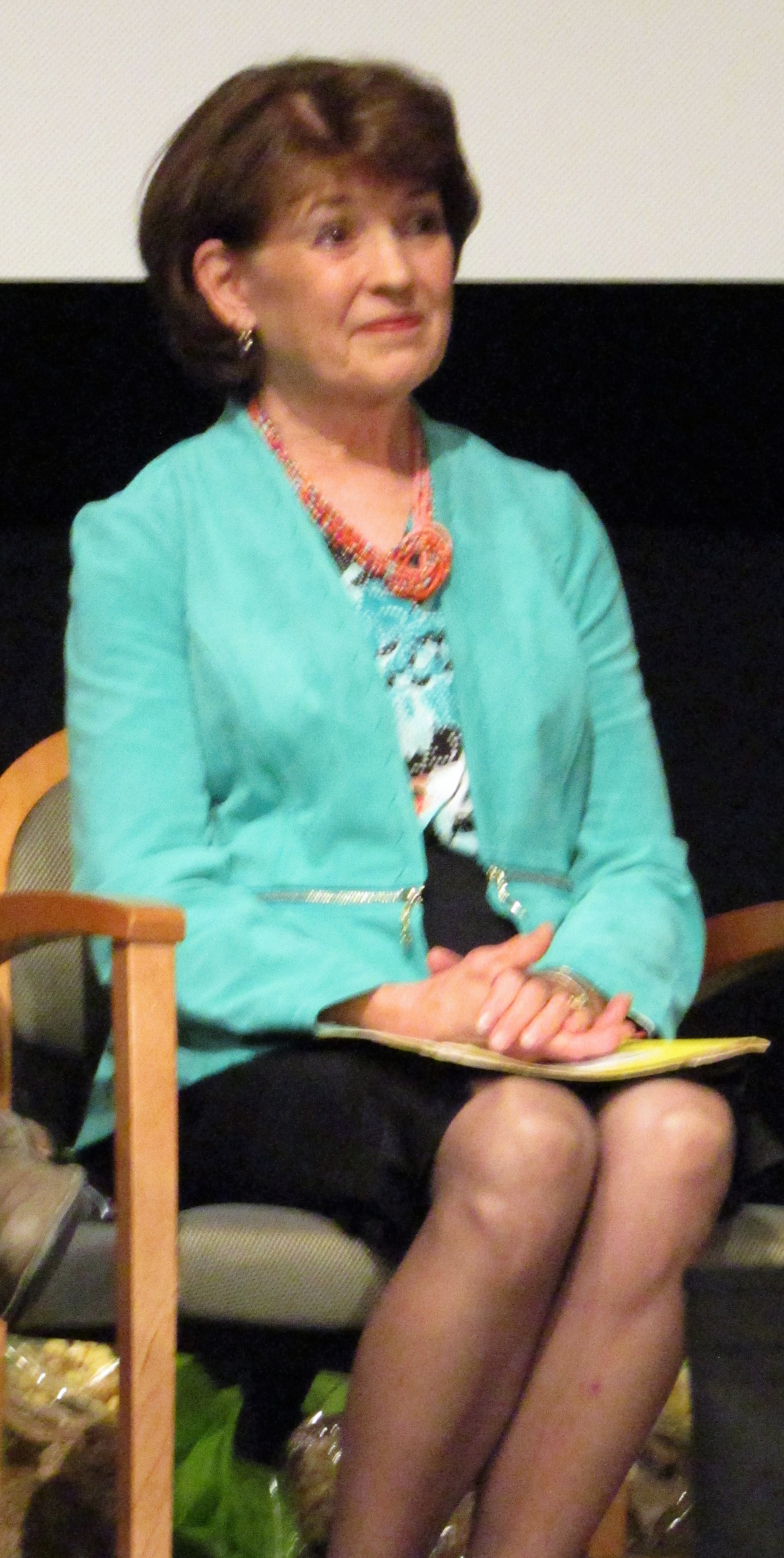
- Susan W. Tanner

12th Young Women General President
- October 2, 2002 – April 5, 2008
- Called by: Gordon B. Hinckley
- Predecessor: Margaret D. Nadauld
- Successor: Elaine S. Dalton

Personal details
- Born: January 10, 1953 (age 72); Granger, Utah
- Alma mater: Brigham Young University
- Notable works: Daughters in My Kingdom (2011)
- Spouse(s): John S. Tanner (m. 1974)
- Children: 5
- Parents: Richard W. Winder; Barbara Woodhead
- Relatives: John R. Winder; Great-great-grandfather

Susan Winder Tanner (born January 10, 1953) was the twelfth Young Women general president of the Church of Jesus Christ of Latter-day Saints (LDS Church) from 2002 to 2008.

Born in Granger, Utah, to Richard W. Winder and Barbara Woodhead, Tanner grew up on the Winder family homestead at Winder Dairy. She earned a degree in humanities from Brigham Young University. Tanner married John S. Tanner in the Salt Lake Temple in 1974. They are the parents of five children. She is a great-great granddaughter of church leader John R. Winder.

== LDS Church service ==
Tanner was called by LDS Church president Gordon B. Hinckley as the Young Women General President on October 5, 2002, succeeding Margaret D. Nadauld. As president of the Young Women, Tanner was an ex officio member of the church's Boards of Trustees/Education. From 2002 to 2007, Tanner's counselors in the Young Women general presidency were Julie B. Beck and Elaine S. Dalton. In 2007, Beck was called as the general president of the Relief Society; as a result, from 2007 to 2008, Dalton served as Tanner's first counselor, with Mary N. Cook as her second counselor. In 2008, Tanner was succeeded as president of the Young Women by Dalton.

After she was released as Young Women president at the request of the church, Tanner wrote Daughters in My Kingdom (2011), a book about the history of the Relief Society published by the LDS Church and distributed to adult women members.

From 2011 to 2014, Tanner served with her husband, while he was president of the church's Brazil São Paulo South Mission. The Tanners lived in Laie, Hawaii from 2015 to 2020 while her husband served as the 10th president of Brigham Young University-Hawaii.

The Church of Jesus Christ of Latter-day Saints titles
Preceded by Margaret D. Nadauld	Young Women General President; October 2, 2002 – April 5, 2008	Succeeded by Elaine S. Dalton
