= Domitian (disambiguation) =

Domitian was a Roman emperor of the Flavian dynasty who reigned 81–96.

Domitian may also refer to:

- Domitian II (died 271), Roman usurper for a few weeks
- Domitius Domitianus (died 297), rarely known as Domitian III, Roman usurper who ruled Egypt in 297
- Domitian of Huy (died 560), Gaulish bishop and saint
- Domitian of Melitene (c. 550–602), Archbishop of Melitene, saint and nephew of Eastern Roman Emperor Maurice
- Domitian of Carantania (died c. 802), Slavic nobleman, Catholic saint and legendary cofounder of the Millstatt Abbey

== See also ==
- Domitius (disambiguation)
