= Liriel Domiciano =

Brazilian pop star and classical singer

Liriel Domiciano (born November 26, 1981) is a Brazilian pop star and classical singer. She is a soprano. She was born in São Paulo. Along with Rinaldo Viana, she won the" "Quem Sabe Canta, Quem Não Sabe Dança" from Programa Raul Gil, the equivalent of the United States' American Idol. Their first CD, Romance, became the second-highest classical bestseller in Brazilian history. Two CDs released later also became bestsellers.

== Life ==
Liriel was discovered at a bridal fair in São Paulo. She had never taken formal singing lessons, but was singing classical arias at the age of 5. Around the age of 14, she began singing with a group called "Voices of Zion." She was applying for a job as a seamstress at the bridal fair, but auditioned instead to be a wedding singer, choosing a Puccini aria for her material. Within a short time, she was on television.

== Religion ==
Domiciano joined the Church of Jesus Christ of Latter-day Saints (LDS Church) at the age of 14. It has proven to be an important part of her life and character. During the 8 months of the Raul Gil Amateur Show, she wore a medallion that represented her faith and values. She also decided not to sign with Brazil's biggest talent agency because she has made a commitment to sing for the Church.

On April 4, 2004, Liriel became the first soloist to sing at the LDS Church's General Conference since the 1930s.

== Discography ==
=== Romance ===
1. En Aranjuez Con Tu Amor
2. Con Te Partiró
3. Tristesse
4. Tormento D´Amore
5. Solo Con Te
6. Can You Feel The Love Tonight
7. Caruso
8. Adágio De Albinoni
9. Canto Della Terra
10. Eu Nunca Mais Vou Te Esquecer
11. Panis Angelicus
12. Adeste Fideles
13. Noite Feliz

=== Tempo de Amar ===
1. Strani Amori
2. Hábito Do Amor
3. Nessun Dorma
4. Piano
5. Me Espere Até Amanhã
6. Planeta Água
7. Alta Luce Del Sole
8. Tempo De Amar
9. Here In My Heart
10. Canção Inesperada
11. Entre O Céu E O Mar
12. Se Eu Não Te Encontrasse
13. O Sonhador
14. La Bohème

=== Heaven's Eyes ===
1. March With Me
2. The Star In You
3. Monte Castelo
4. II Cuor Senza Sangue
5. Half A Chance
6. Heaven's Eyes
7. Dream A Dream
8. Someday, Somewhere
9. Cantico
10. Songs Of Lullaby
11. The Moment
12. Lift Up Your Heads
13. Everyday I Love You
14. The World In Union
