= Janette Hales Beckham =

American religious leader and politician (1933–2022)

10th Young Women General President
- April 4, 1992 – October 4, 1997
- Called by: Ezra Taft Benson
- Predecessor: Ardeth G. Kapp
- Successor: Margaret D. Nadauld

Second Counselor in Young Women General Presidency
- March 31, 1990 – April 4, 1992
- Called by: Ardeth G. Kapp
- Predecessor: Elaine L. Jack
- Successor: Patricia P. Pinegar

Utah House of Representatives

In office
- 1988 – 1991
- Political party: Republican

Personal details
- Born: Janette Callister; June 7, 1933; Springville, Utah, U.S.
- Died: March 4, 2022 (aged 88); Provo, Utah, U.S.
- Home town: Spanish Fork, Utah, U.S.
- Alma mater: Brigham Young University
- Spouse(s): Robert H. Hales (1955–1988); Raymond E. Beckham (1995–2017)
- Children: 5
- Parents: Thomas L. and Hannah C. Callister

Janette Hales Beckham, commonly known as Janette C. Hales and later, Janette Hales Beckham (née Callister; June 7, 1933 – March 4, 2022), was the tenth general president of the Young Women organization of the Church of Jesus Christ of Latter-day Saints (LDS Church) from 1992 to 1997. She was also a member of the Utah State Legislature from 1988 to 1991.

== Biography ==
Janette Callister was born in Springville, Utah, and raised in Spanish Fork, Utah. She is the daughter of Thomas Leonard Callister (1899–1966) and Hannah Carrick (1904–1993). She attended Brigham Young University (BYU) on scholarship and graduated in 1969. While at BYU, she met her future husband, Robert H. Hales. They were married in 1955 in the Salt Lake Temple. The couple lived in San Antonio, Texas, New York City, and San Francisco and raised five children.

Robert Hales was an ophthalmologist. He was a professor of medicine at the University of Utah and a professor of nursing at BYU. Robert Hales died of cancer in March 1988.

Shortly after her husband's death, Hales was appointed by Utah Governor Norman H. Bangerter to fill a vacancy in the Utah House of Representatives. In the November 1988 election, Hales was elected to the House as a Republican. Hales served in the 48th Utah State Legislature. She decided not to run for re-election in 1990 and stepped down after one term in January 1991.

In March 1990, when Elaine L. Jack was released as a counselor in the general presidency of the LDS Church's Young Women organization to become general president of the church's Relief Society, Young Women president Ardeth G. Kapp selected Hales as her new counselor. Hales served in this capacity until 1992, when Kapp was released and Hales was selected as her successor.

During her tenure as general president of the Young Women, Hales was assisted by four counselors: Virginia H. Pearce, Patricia P. Pinegar, Bonnie D. Parkin, and Carol B. Thomas. Pinegar went on to serve as general president of the church's Primary and Parkin went on to serve as the general president of the Relief Society. Hales was released in 1997 and succeeded by Margaret D. Nadauld.

In 1995, while serving as general Young Women president, Hales married Raymond E. Beckham and changed her surname to Beckham. He was a BYU professor of communication who was heavily involved in fundraising and supervising extension work, including the operations of BYU's short-lived Las Vegas center.

Beckham was a member of the LDS Church's Olympic Coordinating Committee for the Salt Lake City Winter Olympics from 1998 to 2002. In 2004, Beckham became a member of the Utah Valley State College (later Utah Valley University (UVU)) Board of Trustees and later served as the chair of the board. She left the UVU board in 2011.

Beckham has also served on the board of directors of Deseret Book Company.

== Notes ==
The Church of Jesus Christ of Latter-day Saints titles
Preceded by Ardeth G. Kapp	Young Women General President; 1992-October 4, 1997	Succeeded by Margaret D. Nadauld
Preceded by Elaine L. Jack	Second Counselor in the Young Women General Presidency; 1990–1992	Succeeded by Patricia P. Pinegar
Political offices
Preceded by	48th Utah State Legislature; 1988–1991	Succeeded by
