= Domitius =

Domitius may refer to:

- Dometius of Persia, Christian saint, d. 300s
- Dometius of Byzantium, Christian bishop, d. 200s
- Dometius, founding monk of the Monastery of the Holy Trinity, Meteora, in 1438
- Saint Domitius, a French saint
- Domitius Afer
- Domitius Alexander
- Domitius Domitianus
- Gnaeus Domitius Corbulo
- Domitius Modestus
- Gnaeus Domitius Ahenobarbus (father of Nero)
- Domitius Marsus, poet
- Domitius, a minor Roman god and one of the indigitamenta
- Domitius (spider), a genus of scaffold web spiders
- Domitia gens, an ancient Roman family
