= General conference (Latter Day Saints) =

Churchwide meeting tradition in the Latter Day Saint movement

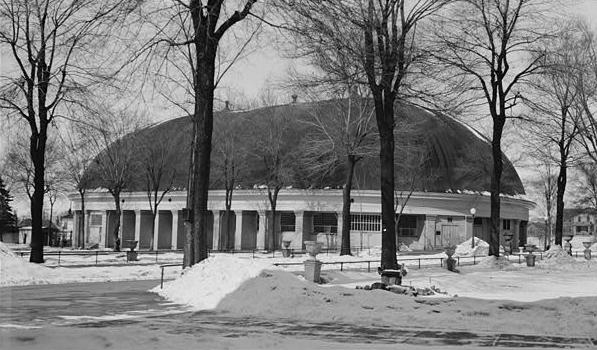
The Salt Lake Tabernacle, where LDS Church general conferences were held from 1867 until 2000.

In the Latter Day Saint movement, a general conference is a meeting for all members of the church for conducting general church business and instruction. When Joseph Smith established the Church of Christ in 1830, he was instructed by revelation that the church "are to meet in conference once in three months, or from time to time as said conferences shall direct or appoint; And said conferences are to do whatever church business is necessary to be done at the time." The church met in conferences regularly until Smith's death in 1844.

Since Smith's death, the churches of the Latter Day Saint movement have continued the tradition of meeting in regular general conferences.

== Frequency and locations ==
The first general conference of the newly formed Church of Christ was held on June 9, 1830, in Fayette, New York, presided over by Joseph Smith. It included a gathering of 27 members of the two-month-old church.

Originally, conferences of the church were held approximately every three months, as suggested by a revelation which outlined the initial organization of the church. Beginning in 1832, the conferences were held less frequently, usually to conduct special church business or to respond to special church needs. At these early conferences, Smith would occasionally receive revelations, which were later canonized as part of the Doctrine and Covenants. During this time, rather than convening a general conference, often the church would hold local conferences that were held in various locations. Once the majority of the church gathered in Nauvoo, Illinois, it settled into a more regular pattern of holding general conferences twice per year, in April and October.

The following are the dates and locations of the general conferences from the establishment of the church until Smith's death in 1844:

Date	Location	Notes
June 9, 1830	Fayette, New York	First general conference of the Church of Christ.
September 26–28, 1830	Fayette, New York	Two revelations were received by Smith.
January 2, 1831	Fayette, New York	A revelation was received by Smith.
June 3–6, 1831	Kirtland, Ohio	The office of high priest was created.
October 11, 25–26, 1831	Hiram and Orange, Ohio	The meeting on October 11 was held at Hiram, while the meetings on October 25–26 were held at Orange. Asked for further details on how the Book of Mormon was produced, Smith stated that "it was not intended to tell the world all the particulars of the coming forth of the Book of Mormon [and] that it was not expedient for him to relate these things". A revelation was received by Smith.
January 25, 1832	Amherst, Ohio	Smith was sustained as the President of the High Priesthood for the first time.
April 6, 1833	Independence, Missouri	Smith notes that "[t]his was the first attempt made by the Church to celebrate the anniversary of her birthday, and those who professed not our faith talked about it as a strange thing".
May 3, 1834	Kirtland, Ohio	A resolution was unanimously adopted "that this Church shall be known hereafter by the name of the Church of the Latter Day Saints".
May 2, 1835	Kirtland, Ohio	First general conference after the organization of the Quorum of the Twelve and the Seventy.
December 22, 1836	Kirtland, Ohio	
September 3, 1837	Kirtland, Ohio	
April 7, 1838	Far West, Missouri	
October 5–6, 1838	Far West, Missouri	First conference after the name of the church had been changed to the Church of Jesus Christ of Latter Day Saints. John Taylor sustained as a member of the Quorum of the Twelve.
October 6–8, 1839	Commerce, Illinois	
April 6–8, 1840	Nauvoo, Illinois	
October 3–5, 1840	Nauvoo, Illinois	
April 7–8, 1841	Nauvoo, Illinois	
October 2–5, 1841	Nauvoo, Illinois	
April 6–7, 1842	Nauvoo, Illinois	
August 29, 1842	Nauvoo, Illinois	Special conference to address claims about the church being spread by John C. Bennett.
April 6–9, 1843	Nauvoo, Illinois	
October 6–9, 1843	Nauvoo, Illinois	Smith expressed his dissatisfaction with Sidney Rigdon, his counselor in the First Presidency. After hearing defences from Rigdon and others, the church voted to sustain Rigdon as a counselor in the First Presidency. In response, Smith stated, "I have thrown him off my shoulders, and you have again put him on me. You may carry him, but I will not."
April 6–9, 1844	Nauvoo, Illinois	As part of the conference, Smith preached the King Follett discourse. Final general conference before Smith's death.

== After Smith's death ==
Following Smith's death and the resulting succession crisis, general conferences have been practiced in different forms by the various denominations in the Latter Day Saint movement.

=== General Conferences of The Church of Jesus Christ of Latter-day Saints ===
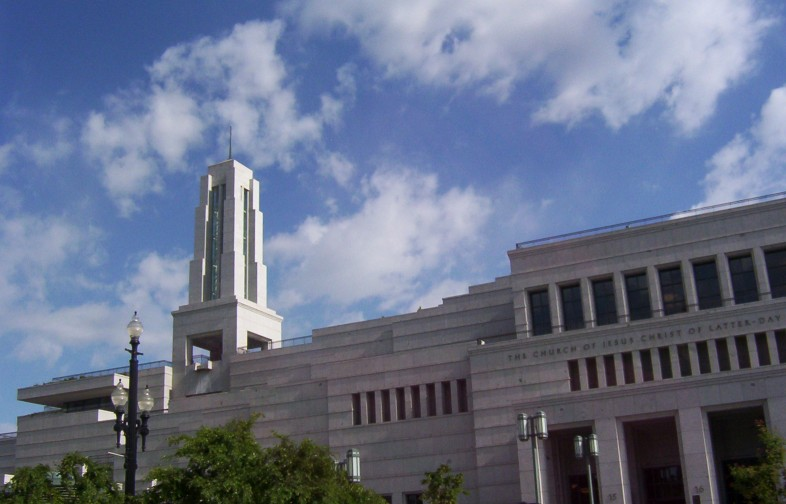
The Conference Center in Salt Lake City

In the Church of Jesus Christ of Latter-day Saints (LDS Church), general conferences are a semiannual meeting where general authorities and other church leaders preach sermons and give guidance to church members. Changes to church leadership are also proposed and sustained through the principle of common consent. General conferences are held on the weekends containing the first Sunday in April and the first Sunday in October.

The conferences have been held in Salt Lake City, Utah, since 1848; they were held in the Salt Lake Tabernacle on Temple Square from 1867 to 2000 and in the Conference Center after that.

Various speakers will generally include all members of the First Presidency and Quorum of the Twelve Apostles, along with other selected church leaders. Almost every general authority of the church is present, though outside the First Presidency and Twelve only a few speak. Non–general authority speakers may include male and female officers of church organizations.

During one session the conducting officer presents all the church's general authorities and general officers for a formal sustaining vote of the membership, and it is usually at this time that any changes among the general church leadership are announced.

Frequently, significant announcements are made at general conference, which may include building sites for new temples or the institution of new policies or programs.

The Tabernacle Choir at Temple Square along with the organist at the Conference Center generally provide the majority of the music at LDS Church general conferences.

=== World Conference in Community of Christ ===
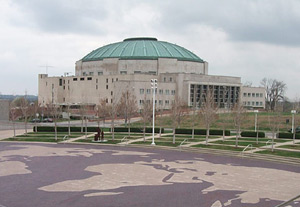
The Community of Christ auditorium

World Conference is the name given to the triennial meeting of delegates of Community of Christ. They were originally called General Conferences and were held semiannually, or as need arose.

The World Conference is the highest legislative body in the Community of Christ and is empowered to act for the entire church. Delegates to the conference are elected by Mission Center conferences. Motions are often debated vigorously and the results are sometimes controversial. World Conferences are traditionally held at Community of Christ World Headquarters, with the legislative and main worship services held in the Auditorium.

== See also ==
- We Thank Thee, O God, for a Prophet
