= Young Women (organization) =

Latter Day Saint movement women's youth organization

- Formation: November 18, 1869; 156 years ago
- Type: Non-profit
- Purpose: religious instruction; personal standards and development; adolescent female support
- Headquarters: Salt Lake City, Utah, US
- Members: 1 million+ young women turning ages 12–18
- General President: Emily Belle Freeman
- Main organ: General presidency and general board
- Parent organization: The Church of Jesus Christ of Latter-day Saints
- Affiliations: Young Men; members join Relief Society at age 18 or married
- Website: youngwomen.churchofjesuschrist.org

The Young Women (often referred to as Young Women's or Young Woman's) is a youth organization of the Church of Jesus Christ of Latter-day Saints (LDS Church). The purpose of the Young Women organization is to help each young woman "be worthy to make and keep sacred covenants and receive the ordinances of the temple".

== History ==
The first official youth association of the church—the Young Gentlemen's and Young Ladies' Relief Society—was formally organized by youth in Nauvoo, Illinois, on the advice of church founder, Joseph Smith, in March 1843. The group had held several informal meetings since late January of that year under the supervision of apostle Heber C. Kimball. The Young Women organization of the church was founded by LDS Church president Brigham Young in 1869 as the Young Ladies' Department of the Cooperative Retrenchment Association. At the organization's founding, Young set out his vision for the young women of the church:

I desire them to retrench from extravagance in dress, in eating and even in speech. The time has come when the sisters must agree ... to set an example worthy of imitation before the people of the world. ... There is need for the young daughters of Israel to get a living testimony of the truth. ... We are about to organize a retrenchment Association, which I want you all to join, and I want you to vote to retrench in ... everything that is not good and beautiful, not to make yourselves unhappy, but to live so you may be truly happy in this life and in the life to come.

From 1869 to 1880, the new Young Women organization functioned at the local ward level, without a general presidency. In 1871, the organization was renamed the Young Ladies' Retrenchment Association, or YL for short. In 1877, the organization's name was again changed to the Young Ladies' National Mutual Improvement Association (YLNMIA) as a companion organization to the church's Young Men's Mutual Improvement Association, which had been founded in 1875.

On June 19, 1880, the first general presidency of the YLNMIA with church-wide authority was organized under the direction of LDS Church president John Taylor, with Elmina Shepard Taylor as the first general president. In 1904, the name of the YLNMIA was shorted to the Young Ladies' Mutual Improvement Association (YLMIA) and in 1934 it was changed to the Young Women's Mutual Improvement Association (YWMIA).

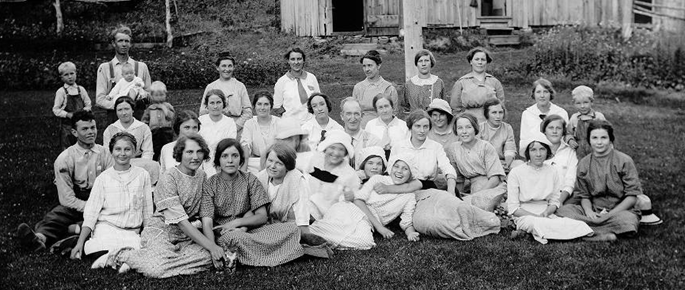
A gathering of the YLMIA in Springdell, Utah, in 1914

The "Aaronic Priesthood MIA Young Women" was the name of the LDS Church's official youth organization between 1972 and 1974. It was formed by consolidating the Young Men's Mutual Improvement Association and the YWMIA into one organization. Leadership of the organization was shared between the presiding bishopric and the general presidency of the Young Women. The combined organization was short-lived, and in 1974 the organization was again divided into the renamed Young Men and the Young Women.

From 1994 to 2013, an annual General Young Women Meeting was held in March, where typically the Young Women general presidency and a member of the church's First Presidency would speak to the young women, their mothers, and the adult Young Women leaders. The meeting was broadcast via satellite to LDS Church meetinghouses throughout the world. The proceedings of the meeting were published in the May issues of the Liahona and Ensign magazines. Video and audio of the proceedings are archived and available for downloading on the church's website. In 2014, the meeting was replaced by a semiannual general women's meeting for those eight years of age and older.

From 1959 until 2019, young women were sub-divided into three aged-based classes: Beehive (12–13 year olds), Mia Maids (14–15 year olds), and Laurels (16–17 year olds). Also at the end of 2019, the Personal Progress program was discontinued and replaced by the Church's new "Children and Youth Program".

In 2026, the church announced new age-group names for young women: Builder of Faith (11–13 year olds), Messenger of Hope (14–15 year olds), and Gatherer of Light (16–18 year olds).

== In the church today ==
"I am a beloved daughter of Heavenly Parents, with a divine nature and eternal destiny.

As a disciple of Jesus Christ, I strive to become like Him. I seek and act upon personal revelation and minister to others in His holy name.

I will stand as a witness of God at all times and in all things and in all places.

As I strive to qualify for exaltation, I cherish the gift of repentance and seek to improve each day. With faith, I will strengthen my home and family, make and keep sacred covenants, and receive the ordinances and blessings of the holy temple."

— Young Women Theme

In each ward (local congregation), all females (ages 11 to 18) are members of Young Women classes. The sub-division of each class vary based on the total number of young women in each congregation, and determined on a local level at the discretion of the young women president with the approval of the bishopric, and each group is led by a class presidency generally consisting of a president, two counselors, and a class secretary. Adult leadership for the ward consists of a Young Women President and two counselors; and the presidency may also ask an adult woman to be the secretary to the presidency. Generally, during Sunday meetings, each class will meeting separately for instruction. Young women also meeting one day during the week for an activity, and once a month they typically hold a combined activity with the young men.

Local church Young Women organizations are supported by a stake Young Women presidency, and stake and ward Young Women organizations are supported by the Young Women General Presidency.

The church advises that young women and their leaders repeat the theme during Sunday opening exercises and at other Young Women gatherings.

In addition to Sunday meetings and youth activities, most local organizations also organize an annual Young Women Camp, or Girls Camp. Young Women Camps may be held at the ward or the stake level. Also, every other year eligible young women may attend regional For the Strength of Youth conferences.

== Chronology of the general presidency of the Young Women ==
No.	Dates	General President	First Counselor	Second Counselor
1	1880–1904	Elmina Shepard Taylor	Margaret Young Taylor (1880–87); Maria Young Dougall (1887–1904)	Martha H. Tingey
2	1905–29	Martha H. Tingey	Ruth May Fox	Mae Taylor Nystrom (1905–23); Lucy Grant Cannon (1923–29)
3	1929–37	Ruth May Fox	Lucy Grant Cannon	Clarissa A. Beesley
4	1937–48	Lucy Grant Cannon	Helen S. Williams (1937–44); Verna W. Goddard (1944–48)	Verna W. Goddard (1937–44); Lucy T. Andersen (1944–48)
5	1948–61	Bertha S. Reeder	Emily H. Bennett	LaRue C. Longden
6	1961–72	Florence S. Jacobsen	Margaret R. J. Judd	Dorothy P. Holt
7	1972–78	Ruth H. Funk	Hortense H. C. Smith	Ardeth G. Kapp
8	1978–84	Elaine A. Cannon	Arlene B. Darger	Norma B. Smith
9	1984–92	Ardeth G. Kapp	Patricia T. Holland (1984–86); Maurine J. Turley (1986–87); Jayne B. Malan (1987–92)	Maurine J. Turley (1984–86); Jayne B. Malan (1986–87); Elaine L. Jack (1987–90); Janette C. Hales (1990–92)
10	1992–97	Janette C. Hales (name changed to Janette Hales Beckham in 1995)	Virginia H. Pearce	Patricia P. Pinegar (1992–94); Bonnie D. Parkin (1994–97); Carol B. Thomas (1997)
11	1997–2002	Margaret D. Nadauld	Carol B. Thomas	Sharon G. Larsen
12	2002–08	Susan W. Tanner	Julie B. Beck (2002–07); Elaine S. Dalton (2007–08)	Elaine S. Dalton (2002–07); Mary N. Cook (2007–08)
13	2008–13	Elaine S. Dalton	Mary N. Cook	Ann M. Dibb
14	2013–18	Bonnie L. Oscarson	Carol F. McConkie	Neill F. Marriott
15	2018–2023	Bonnie H. Cordon	Michelle D. Craig	Becky Craven
16	2023–present	Emily Belle Freeman	Tamara W. Runia	Andrea M. Spannaus

== See also ==
- Anticipatory socialization
- The Contributor
- Young Woman's Journal
- Improvement Era
- New Era (magazine)
- Worship services of The Church of Jesus Christ of Latter-day Saints
- June Conference
