= Common consent =

Practice in the Latter Day Saint movement

Common consent is a democratic principle established by Joseph Smith, the founder of the Latter Day Saint movement, who taught in 1830 that "all things must be done in order, and by common consent in the church, by the prayer of faith."

== The Church of Jesus Christ of Latter-day Saints ==
As it is most frequently used by the Church of Jesus Christ of Latter-day Saints (LDS Church), common consent, more commonly known as a sustaining, is the act of publicly showing one's support for a specific leader in a particular church calling or position by the uplifted right hand. The principle requires consent from all members of an organization before the action of setting apart may take place. Local leaders are typically sustained by a local congregation before they officially begin their role. If a person objects, they would typically be met with individually to share their concerns and the sustaining may be put on hold until the objection is heard. General leaders are sustained by the church at large in general, stake, and ward conferences.

New doctrine is presented to the church before being canonized as a part of the standard works.

== See also ==
- General conference (Latter Day Saints)
- General Conference (LDS Church)
- World Conference (Community of Christ)
