= General Conference (LDS Church) =

Biannual assembly of LDS Church members

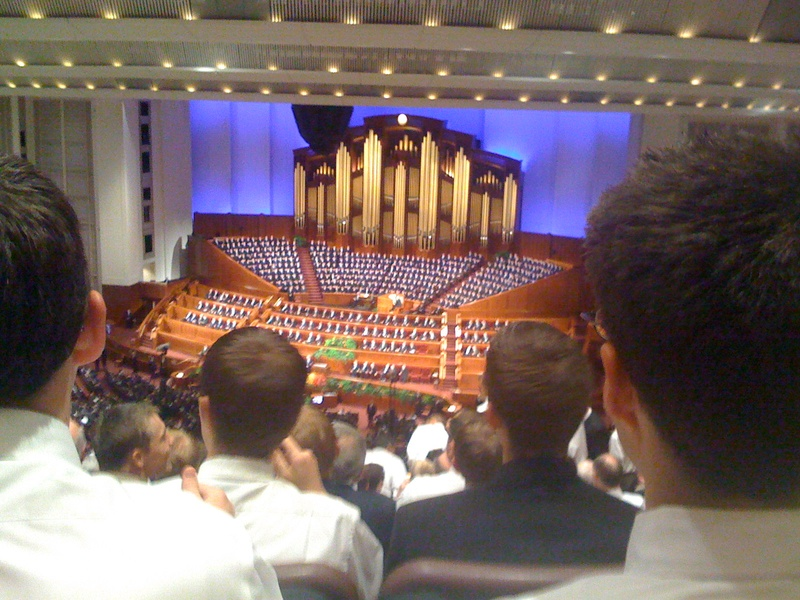
- Status: Active, bi-annual
- Genre: Religious
- Venue: Conference Center
- Location: Salt Lake City, Utah
- Country: United States
- Inaugurated: 9 June 1830
- Organizer: The Church of Jesus Christ of Latter-day Saints
- Website: churchofjesuschrist.org/general-conference

General Conference is a biannual gathering of members of the Church of Jesus Christ of Latter-day Saints (LDS Church), held every April and October at the Conference Center in Salt Lake City, Utah. During each conference, church members gather in a series of two-hour sessions to listen to the faith's leaders.

In recent history, it typically consisted of five general sessions: two each on Saturday and Sunday, along with one for holders of the priesthood on Saturday night. From April 2018 to April 2021, a session for holders of the priesthood was held during the April conference, with a General Women's Session (for females 11 years and older) held during October's conference. The Saturday evening session was changed to a general session in October 2021. In November 2025, the church announced that the Saturday evening session would be discontinued. The conference also generally includes training sessions for general and area leaders. (Note: In consideration of restrictions related to COVID-19, the church originally indicated that the April 2020 leadership sessions would be postponed until October. The planned leadership sessions in October were also subsequently postponed.) Although each general conference originates from Salt Lake City, the conference is considered an international event for the church. The sessions are broadcast worldwide in over 90 languages, primarily through local and international media outlets, and over the Internet.

== History and structure ==
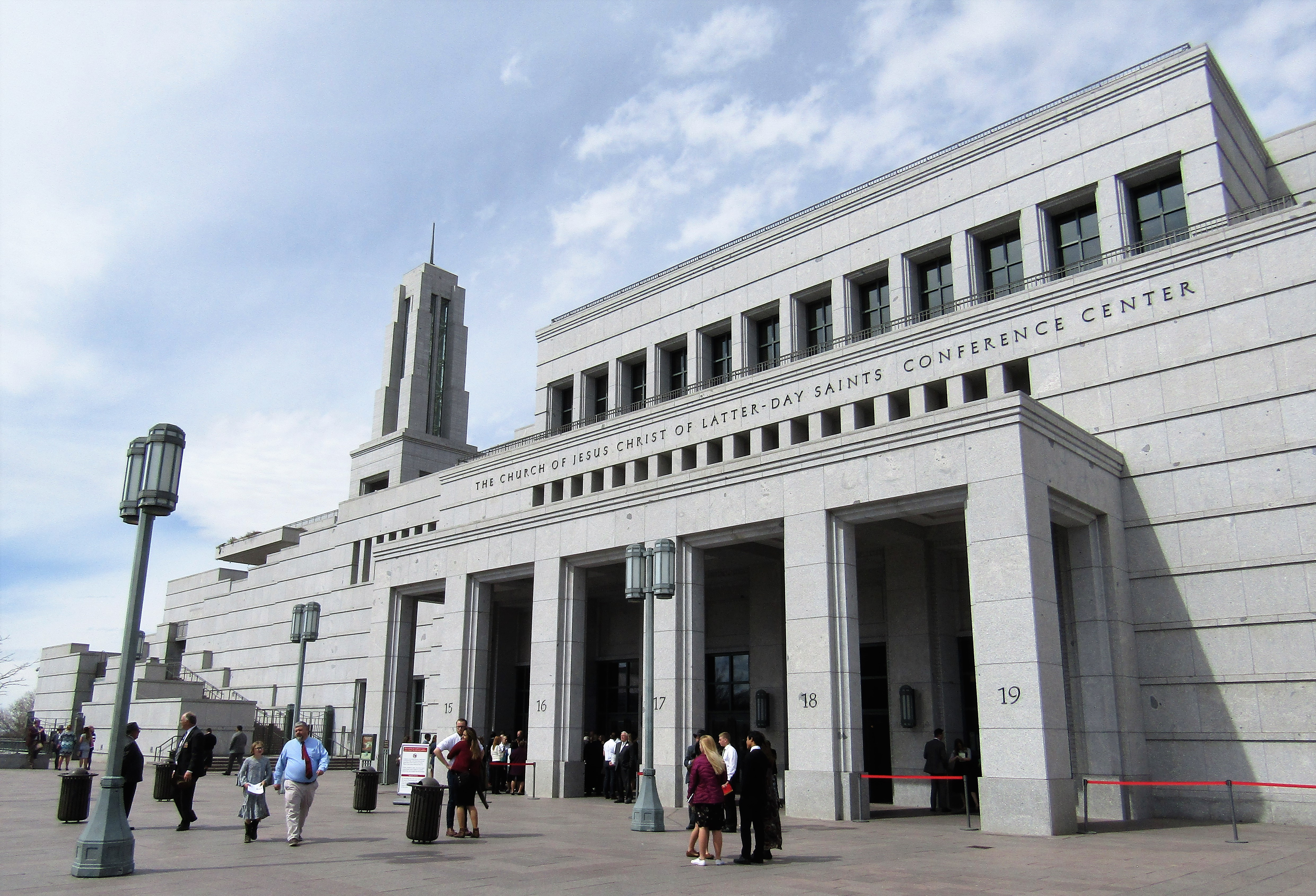
The LDS Church's Conference Center in Salt Lake City, Utah.

In the LDS Church, general conference is a series of semiannual meetings where general authorities and other church leaders preach sermons and give guidance to its members. Changes to church leadership are also proposed and sustained through the principle of common consent. General conferences are held on the weekends of the first Sundays in April and October. The April conference is known as the Annual General Conference, with the October conference referred to as the Semiannual General Conference. The April conference includes a financial audit report not included in the October meeting. Both conferences are identified by the number of years since the church was founded in April 1830; thus, the April 2025 sessions constituted the 195th Annual General Conference, and the October 2025 sessions constituted the 195th Semiannual General Conference.

Since October 1848, (Note: After the death of Joseph Smith, general conferences were held under the direction of Brigham Young in October 1844 (Nauvoo, Illinois); April 1845 (Nauvoo); October 1845 (Nauvoo); December 1847 (Kanesville, Iowa); and April 1848 (Kanesville). For the dates and locations of conferences prior to Smith's death, see General conference (Latter Day Saints).) all of the conferences have been held in Salt Lake City, Utah, with the exception of the April 1877 conference, which was held in St. George, Utah. Conferences were held in a bowery in Salt Lake City from 1848 to 1852, in the Old Salt Lake Tabernacle from 1852 to 1867, in the Salt Lake Tabernacle from October 1867 to October 1999, and in the Conference Center since that time. Historically, sessions were held over three days, with the annual conference always including April 6, the anniversary of the church's organization. This made conference participation difficult for those with work and school commitments when April 6 fell on a weekday. In April 1977, changes were made to reduce the conference to the first Sunday of April and October and the preceding Saturday. (Note: If the first day of April or October is a Sunday, the Saturday sessions have sometimes been held on March 31 and September 30.)

Beginning in 1994, a women's general meeting was held on Saturday a week prior to the general sessions of the October conference, with a general meeting for young women held at a similar time before the April conference. In November 2013, church leadership announced that beginning in 2014 these meetings for women would be replaced by a semiannual General Women's Meeting for those eight years of age and older. In October 2014, the First Presidency announced that it "has decided that the General Women's Meeting will be designated as the General Women's Session of general conference."

Since April 2018, the conference has consisted of four general sessions, held at 10:00 a.m. and 2:00 p.m. MT on both Saturday and Sunday. Another general session targeted to specific groups is held on Saturday evening. In October 2017, the First Presidency had announced that, beginning in April 2018, the Priesthood Session for all holders of the Aaronic or Melchizedek priesthoods would occur during the April conference, with a General Women's Session for all women and girls ages 11 or older held during October's conference. These sessions occur during the Saturday evening time previously used for the Priesthood Session.

Due to the COVID-19 pandemic, the April 2020, October 2020, and April 2021 general Conferences were held behind closed doors in a small auditorium on Temple Square, with only those speaking and members of the First Presidency and the Quorum of the Twelve in attendance. Music was reused from previous performances of the Tabernacle Choir. The October 2021 General Conference returned to the Conference Center, but at only five percent capacity. Seating for the 2022 conferences were limited, due to construction work around Temple Square.

The proceedings of a general conference are traditionally been conducted in English, although for a short time, beginning in October 2014, speakers delivering sermons had the option of speaking in their native language. The proceedings are translated and broadcast in over 90 different languages worldwide.

== Organization ==
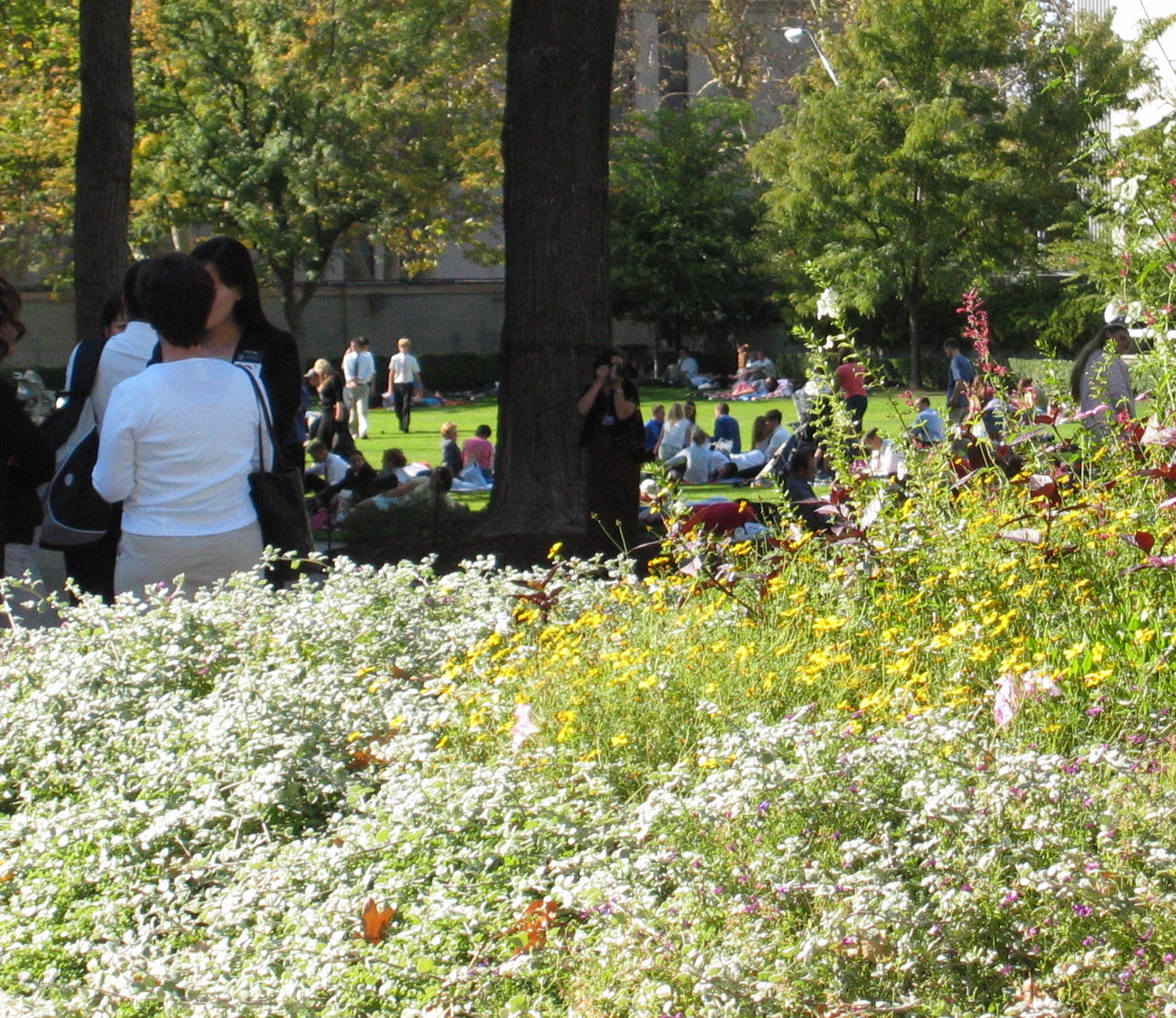
Crowd on Temple Square in between sessions of conference.

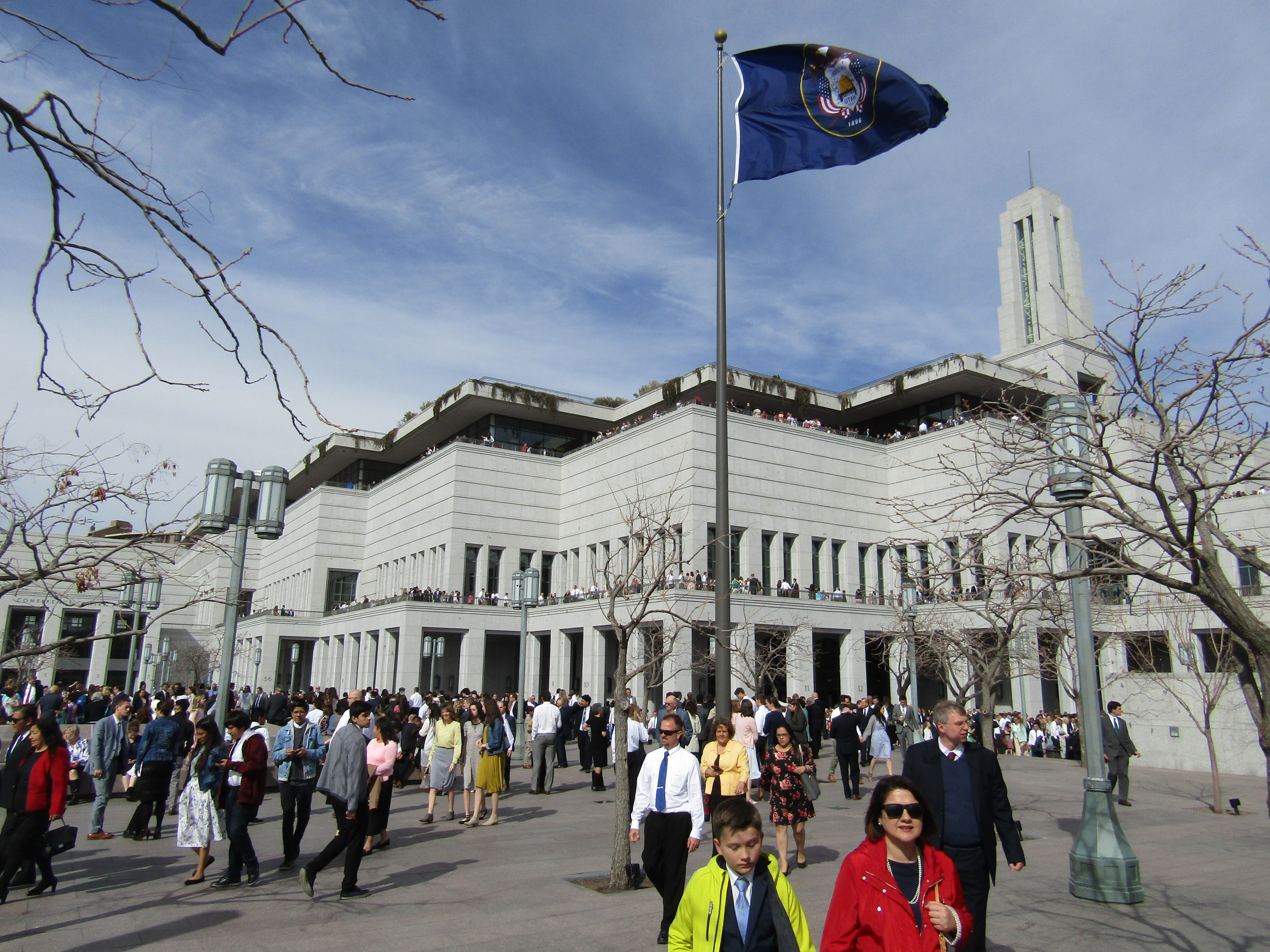
Crowds departing the conference center following a session of conference

A member of the church's First Presidency traditionally conducted each conference session, with the church president presiding. On occasion, when all members of the First Presidency have been absent, or impacted by age or illness, they designated someone to conduct the conference, typically the most senior member of the Quorum of the Twelve Apostles not in the First Presidency. Beginning in April 2024, the First Presidency designated Quorum members to conduct 3 of the 5 sessions. The conducting official introduces the various speakers, which over the course of the sessions will generally include all members of the First Presidency and Quorum of the Twelve Apostles and a selection of other church leaders. Almost every church general authority is present, though outside the First Presidency and Twelve only a few speak. Non–general authority speakers may include male and female officers of church organizations. Most area seventies travel to Utah to attend at least one general conference per year.

During one general session, all the church's general authorities and general officers are presented for the formal sustaining by the membership. Changes among the general church leadership are typically announced at this time. Normally, members of the First Presidency and Quorum of the Twelve are mentioned by name; those in other positions are mentioned by name only if they are released from a previous position or called to a new one. Members are asked to either sustain or oppose via a raised hand for common consent. Those that oppose are referred to local leaders to have a discussion over concerns. The church itself said that raising the hand means that members pledge to stand behind leaders, pray for them, and support them. This sustaining means that members support the leaders through prayer, obey their council, and refrain from criticizing.

At the first General Conference after the death of a church president and the calling of his successor, the session at which the sustaining takes place is called a solemn assembly. The Church News stated that the practice of the solemn assembly is a continuation of an Old Testament practice, described in the Hebrew Bible describing significant gatherings (such as the dedication of Solomon's temple, during the Feast of Tabernacles). Members are asked to "bring an elevated sense of spirituality with them into the meeting." For Latter-day Saints, solemn assemblies can include sustaining a new church president, dedication of a temple or new building (such as the Conference Center in 2000), introducing new scripture, and instruction from leaders of the church. Some solemn assembles will include the Hosanna Shout, with symbolism from the New Testament to honor God and Jesus Christ.

Typically, the order is: First Presidency, Quorum of the Twelve, Quorums of Seventy, Melchizedek priesthood holders, Aaronic priesthood holders, Relief Society members, members of the Young Women organization, and then all members together. The names of the First Presidency and Quorum of the Twelve are read, and a sustaining and opposing vote is called for.

Traditionally, this was done in one session by a member of the First Presidency. However, in 2018 the process was split between two sessions, with one counselor handling the solemn assembly (sustaining of the apostles) on Saturday morning, and the other counselor presenting other general church leadership changes and sustaining on Saturday afternoon. The most recent solemn assembly, held in April 2026, sustained Dallin H. Oaks as the church's 18th president, with D. Todd Christofferson conducting both the Solemn Assembly during the Saturday Morning Session, and the sustaining of other leaders in the Saturday Afternoon Session.

Frequently, significant announcements are made at a general conference, which may include the announcement of locations for new temples, adjustments to organizations, or changes in practice or policy.

== Music ==
The Tabernacle Choir at Temple Square, formerly known as the Mormon Tabernacle Choir, accompanied by tabernacle organists, generally provides the majority of the music, with the exception of the Saturday afternoon, priesthood sessions, and general women's sessions. At the Saturday afternoon session and the priesthood session guest ensembles include regional choirs, institute choirs, an MTC choir, and the BYU Choirs. The hymns are usually selected from the normal repertoire of Latter-day Saint hymns and their various arrangements, with an occasional piece from traditional sacred choral repertoire. Usually, the congregation is invited to stand and join in with one hymn halfway through each session.

Very rarely, soloist artists will perform for conferences. As of 2004, the last performer to do so, Liriel Domiciano, did so alongside the Tabernacle Choir at Temple Square.

== Sermons ==
Members of the church regard and sustain the president of the church, the counselors in the First Presidency, and members of the Quorum of Twelve Apostles as "prophets, seers, and revelators", and are counseled to pay close attention to what they teach throughout the year. However, the sermons given at general conference are held in particularly high esteem and they are considered the will of God to the church members at the current time. The sermons (called "addresses") are generally published in the Liahona, an official church magazine, the month following a General Conference.

== Broadcasting ==
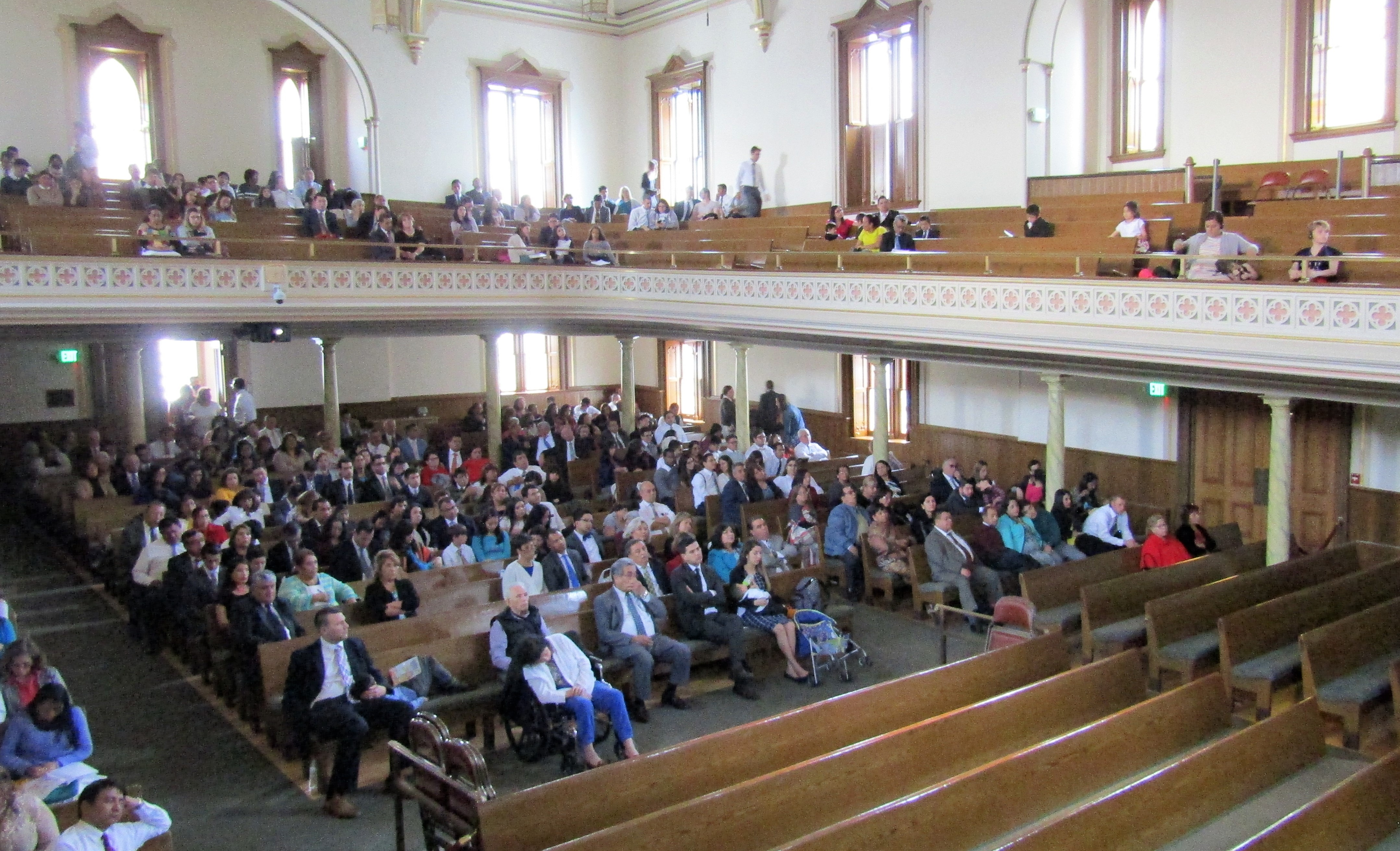
Members watch a live broadcast of conference in overflow seating in the Salt Lake Assembly Hall

The events of the conferences are televised both locally and internationally through various platforms to increase their exposure and availability. Sessions are broadcast on screens in various buildings on Temple Square, including the Tabernacle, Assembly Hall and the Joseph Smith Memorial Building. The conference sessions are also broadcast via satellite to church meetinghouses throughout the world, either simultaneously or time delayed to accommodate differing time zones and languages. The conferences have also aired through webcasts, and since 2010, the complete sermons have been posted on the church's YouTube channel. The sessions are translated and broadcast in over 100 different languages worldwide.

A General Conference was first broadcast on television in October 1949. It was first interpreted in multiple languages in 1961 (Dutch, German, Samoan, and Spanish).

Live coverage of the conferences are also shown on local television and radio stations with ties to the Church. These include Utah's NBC affiliate KSL-TV and ABC News Radio affiliate KSL (AM)/FM (owned by Bonneville International, a commercial broadcasting arm of the church), KBYU-FM and KBYU-TV (public broadcasters owned by Brigham Young University), Latter-day Saints Channel (the church-owned radio network, which also has additional HD Radio coverage in Bonneville markets), KIXR 1400 K-Star, KUTN Star 96.7, KMGR 99.1 Classy FM, BYU Television (national cable and satellite, and over KBYU-DT2), and BYU Radio.

In the Philippines, rebroadcasts of the coverage of conference are shown on GMA Network and its sister channel, GTV, which succeeded GMA News TV in February 2021.

== See also ==
- General conference (Latter Day Saints)
- June Conference
- World Conference (Community of Christ)

== Bibliography ==
- Armstrong, Richard N. (Fall 1997), "Researching Mormonism: General Conference as Artifactual Gold Mine", Dialogue: A Journal of Mormon Thought, 30 (3): 151–68, archived from the original on 2011-08-08.
- Burnett, M. Dallas (1992), "Conferences: General Conference", in Ludlow, Daniel H (ed.), Encyclopedia of Mormonism, New York: Macmillan Publishing, pp. 307–8, ISBN 0-02-879602-0, OCLC 24502140.
- Elliott, Dorice Williams (Spring 1989), "The Mormon Conference Talk as Patriarchal Discourse", Dialogue: A Journal of Mormon Thought, 22 (1): 70–78, archived from the original on 2011-08-08.
- Godfrey, Kenneth W. (February 1981), "150 Years of General Conference", Ensign: 66–71.
- Godfrey, Kenneth W. (2000), "General Conference", in Arnold K. Garr; Donald Q. Cannon; Richard O. Cowan (eds.), Encyclopedia of Latter-day Saint History, Salt Lake City: Deseret Book, ISBN 1-57345-822-8.
- Jarvis, Joseph Boyer (1958), Preaching in the General Conference of the Mormon Church, 1870-1900, Ph.D. dissertation, Northwestern University, OCLC 71796328.
- Lowe, Jay R. (1972), A Study of the General Conferences of the Church of Jesus Christ of Latter-day Saints, 1830–1901, Ph.D. dissertation, Provo, Utah: Brigham Young University, OCLC 367545362.
- Peterson, Paul H. (2002), "Accommodating the Saints at General Conference", BYU Studies, 41 (2): 5–39.
- Rees, Bridget (September–October 2004), "Conference in General", LDS Living, 3 (5): 36–37, 39–43.
- Shepherd, Gordon; Shepherd, Gary (1984), A Kingdom Transformed: Themes in the Development of Mormonism, Salt Lake City: University of Utah Press, ISBN 0-87480-233-4.
- Shepherd, Gordon; Shepherd, Gary (June 1984), "Mormon Commitment Rhetoric", Journal for the Scientific Study of Religion, 23 (2): 129–39, doi:10.2307/1386104, JSTOR 1386104.
- Shepherd, Gordon; Shepherd, Gary (September 1984), "Mormonism in Secular Society: Changing Patterns in Official Ecclesiastical Rhetoric", Review of Religious Research, 26 (1), Religious Research Association: 28–42, doi:10.2307/3511040, JSTOR 3511040.
- Shepherd, Gordon; Shepherd, Gary (Summer 1986), "Modes of Leader Rhetoric in the Institutional Development of Mormonism", Sociological Analysis, 47 (2), Association for the Sociology of Religion: 125–36, doi:10.2307/3711457, JSTOR 3711457.
- Warner, Cecelia (April 1984), "General Conference: Whence and Whither?", Sunstone Review, 4: 2–5.
- Zobell, Albert L. Jr. (April 1950), "The Call to Conference", Improvement Era, 53 (4): 326–29.
