= Cannon family =

Prominent American political family

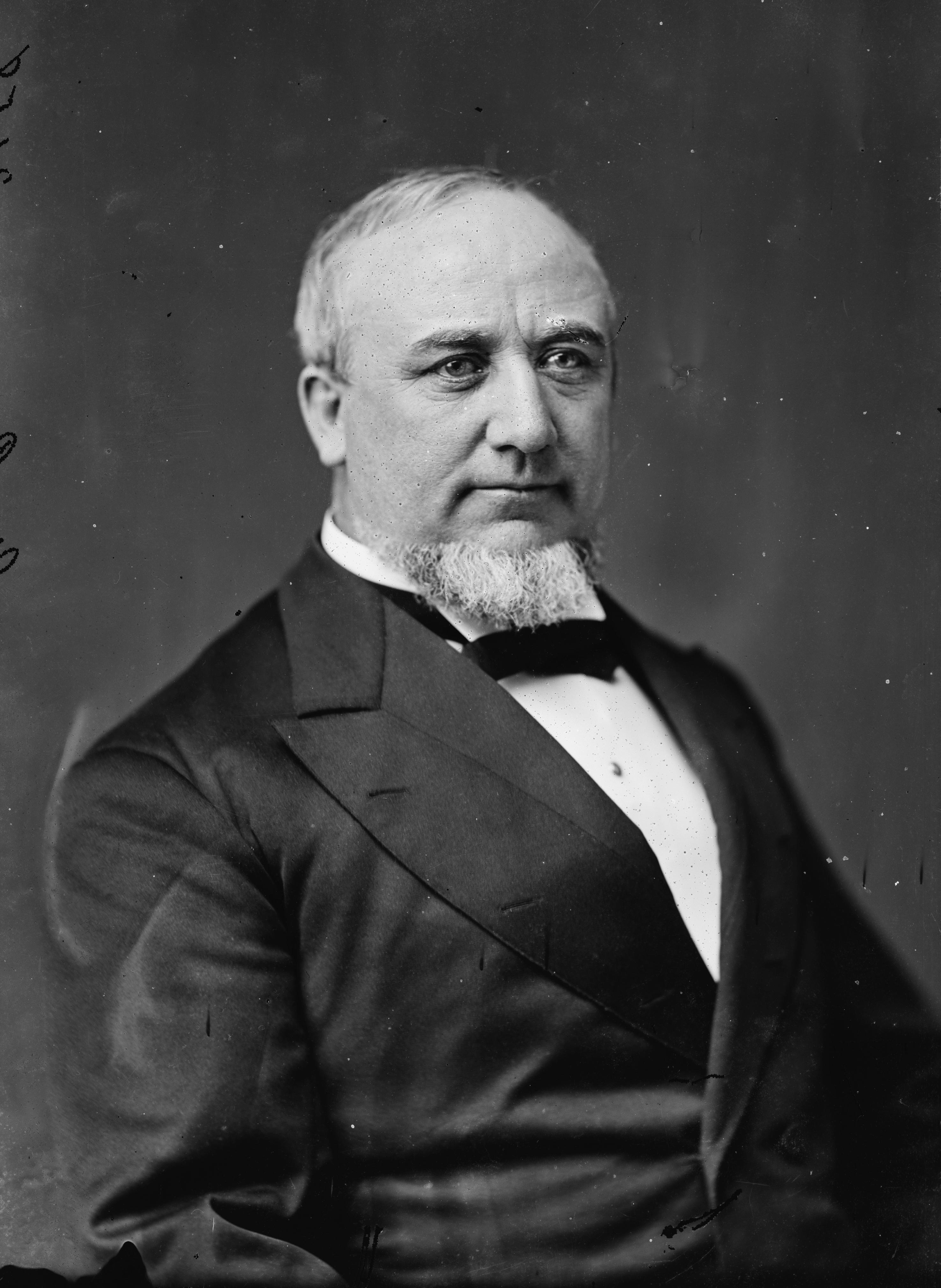
"Cannon, Hon. Geo. Q. of Utah" c. 1873–1881, from Brady-Handy Collection, Library of Congress

The Cannon family is a prominent U.S. political family in the states of Utah, Nevada and Idaho which descends from the 19th century marriage of George Cannon and Ann Quayle before their emigration from Peel, Isle of Man. The family's most powerful politician was their oldest son George Q. Cannon. The family is connected by marriage to the Bennion, Taylor, Wells and Young political families.

== 19th century ==
=== John Taylor ===
November 1, 1808 to July 25, 1887

- Served in 1842 as a member of the Nauvoo, Ill., Council; in 1842 as a regent of the University of Nauvoo; in 1842 as a judge-advocate of the Nauvoo Legion; from 1857 to 1876 as a member of the Utah Territorial House of Representatives from Salt Lake County; from 1868 to 1870 as a probate judge of Utah County; and in 1876 as the superintendent of schools of the Territory of Utah
- Taylorsville, Utah, was founded in 1848 and named in honor of John Taylor
- Not known to have affiliated politically with a party
- Relationships:
  - Husband of Leonora Cannon Taylor
  - Father of John W. Taylor who served in 1883 as a clerk of Cassia County, Idaho, and of William W. Taylor who served from 1883 to 1884 as a member of the Utah Territorial Council (Senate) from Salt Lake County, and in 1884 as the assessor for Salt Lake City

=== George Q. Cannon ===
January 11, 1827 to April 21, 1901

- Also known as George Quayle Cannon Sr.
- Served from 1865 to 1866 and 1869 to 1872 as a member of the Utah Territorial Council (Senate) from Salt Lake County; in 1872 as a delegate to the U.S. House of Representatives to present the constitution and memorial to the Congress for admission of the Territory of Utah as a state of the union; from 1873 to 1881 as a delegate to the U.S. House of Representatives from Utah; in 1882 as a candidate for the U.S. House of Representatives from Utah, defeated; in 1896 as a candidate for the U.S. Senate from Utah, defeated; and as a member and the chancellor of the Deseret University board of regents
- Cannonville, Utah, was founded in 1876 and named in honor of George Q. Cannon
- Affiliated politically with the Republican Party
- Relationships:
  - Son of George Cannon and Ann Quayle
  - Husband of Abraham Hoagland's daughter Elizabeth; Brigham Young's daughter Caroline
  - Father of 32 children, including Abraham H. Cannon, John Q. Cannon, Sylvester Q. Cannon, Frank J. Cannon, Lewis T. Cannon, and Georgious Y. Cannon
  - Brother of Angus M. Cannon

=== Ann Cannon Woodbury ===
January 28, 1832 to July 25, 1921

- Also known as Ann "Annie" Cannon Woodbury
- Served from 1896 to 1905 as a member of the Utah Silk Commission and as its vice president from 1900 to 1905
- Not known to have affiliated politically with a party

=== Angus M. Cannon ===
May 17, 1834 to June 7, 1915

- Also known as Angus Munn Cannon Sr.
- Served in 1861 as the first town marshal of St. George, Utah; from 1861 to about 1867 as the mayor of St. George; in 1864 as a member of the board of directors of the St. George Library Association; as a prosecuting attorney for Washington County, Utah, a later for the Utah Territorial Second Judicial District; in 1865 as a major, and later as a lieutenant colonel, for the Iron County, Utah, Military District Second Regiment; from 1876 to 1884 as the recorder for Salt Lake County; and in 1896 as a candidate for the Utah Senate from Salt Lake County, defeated (by his wife, Martha Hughes Cannon)
- Affiliated politically with the Republican Party
- Relationships:
  - Husband of Clara C. M. Cannon, Martha Hughes Cannon
  - Brother of George Q. Cannon

=== John Q. Cannon ===
April 19, 1857 to January 14, 1931

- Also known as John Quayle Cannon Sr.
- Served from 1903 to 1904 as a brigadier general of the Utah National Guard
- Not known to have affiliated politically with a party
- Relationships:
  - Son of George Q. Cannon and Elizabeth Hoagland Cannon
  - Husband of Annie Wells Cannon

=== Martha Hughes Cannon ===
July 1, 1857 to July 10, 1932

- Also known as Dr. Martha Maria "Mattie" Hughes Cannon
- Served in 1893 as a speaker of women's suffrage at the World's Columbian Exposition in Chicago; from 1894 to 1896 as a speaker of Free Silver with William Jennings Bryan; from January 11, 1897 to January 13, 1901 as a member of the Utah Senate from Salt Lake County (first female state senator in the United States); as a member of the Utah Board of Health which she created; as a member of the Utah School for the Deaf, Dumb and Blind which she helped create; and in 1918 as a member of the U.S. Department of War overseas Medical Service
- The Utah Department of Health Martha Hughes Cannon Health Building was opened in 1986, and was named in honor of Martha Hughes Cannon
- Affiliated politically with the Democratic Party

=== Frank J. Cannon ===
January 25, 1859 to July 25, 1933

- Also known as Franklin Jenne Cannon
- Served from 1882 to 1884 as a deputy clerk and recorder of Weber County, Utah; in 1884 as the recorder of Weber County; in 1891 as an organizer of the Utah Republican Party; in 1892 as a candidate for the U.S. House of Representatives from Utah, defeated; from 1895 to 1896 as a member of the U.S. House of Representatives from Utah; from 1896 to 1899 as a member of the U.S. Senate from Utah; in 1898 as a candidate for the U.S. Senate from Utah, defeated; from 1899 to 1900 as a member of the Silver Republican Party; and from 1902 to 1904 as the chairman of the Utah Democratic Party
- Affiliated politically with the Republican Party, the Silver Republican Party and the Democratic Party

=== Elizabeth Ann Wells Cannon ===
December 7, 1859 to September 2, 1942

- Also known as Elizabeth Ann "Annie" Wells Cannon
- Served in 1913 as a member of the Utah House of Representatives from Salt Lake County
- Affiliated politically with the Republican Party
- Also: Daughter of Daniel H. Wells who served from 1866 to 1876 as the mayor of Salt Lake City

=== George Mousley Cannon ===
December 25, 1861 to January 23, 1937

- Also known as George Mousley Cannon Sr.
- Served in 1882 as a deputy recorder for Salt Lake County; from 1884 to 1890 as the recorder for Salt Lake County; in 1890 as a developer of the Forest Dale Subdivision and the larger town of Forest Dale, Utah; in 1895 as a delegate to the Utah State Constitutional Convention and chaired the committee which formulated the articles on taxation and public debt; and in 1896 as a member and first president of the Utah Senate from Salt Lake County
- Not known to have affiliated politically with a party

=== Joseph J. Cannon ===
May 22, 1877 to November 5, 1945

- Also known as Joseph Jenne Cannon
- Served from 1909 to 1911 as a member of the Utah House of Representatives from Salt Lake County
- Not known to have affiliated politically with a party though his son, Mark Wilcox Cannon, recalled that Joseph later considered himself a Republican

=== Sylvester Q. Cannon ===
June 10, 1877 to May 29, 1943

- Also known as Sylvester Quayle Cannon
- Served from 1905 to 1907 as the director of hydrography for the Utah Office of the State Engineer
- Not known to have affiliated politically with a party

=== Charles Clarence Neslen ===
April 17, 1879 to December 7, 1967

- Also known as C. Clarence Neslen
- Served in 1912 as a delegate to the Democratic National Convention; in 1917 as a commissioner of Salt Lake City and as the chairman of the city planning commission; from 1917 to 1918 as the chairman of the U.S. Department of War draft board for the city 3rd District; from 1918 to 1928 as the commissioner for the Salt Lake City water supply and waterworks; from 1920 to 1928 as the mayor of Salt Lake City; from 1926 to 1932 as a major and chaplain for the Utah National Guard 145th Field Artillery Group; from 1931 to 1933 as a member of the Utah House of Representatives from Salt Lake County; and from 1933 to 1935 as a member of the Utah Senate from Salt Lake County
- Affiliated politically with the Democratic Party

=== Quayle Cannon Sr. ===
December 30, 1879 to August 26, 1950

- Served from 1923 to 1925 as a member of the Utah House of Representatives from Salt Lake County
- Not known to have affiliated politically with a party

=== James H. Cannon ===
May 19, 1890 to February 20, 1950

- Also known as James Hughes Cannon
- Founder in 1915 of the Cannon Electric Co. in Los Angeles; and known for inventing the "Cannon Plug" (also known as the XLR connector used widely today)
- Not known to have affiliated politically with a party

=== John K. Cannon ===
March 2, 1892 to January 12, 1955

- Also known as John Kenneth Cannon
- Served from 1917 to 1942 as a service member of the U.S. Army and U.S. Army Air Corps; from 1942 to 1945 as a commanding general of the U.S. Army Air Forces of World War II, from 1945 to 1946 as the commanding general of U.S. Air Forces in Europe, from 1946 to 1948 as the commanding general of Air Training Command at Barksdale Field in Louisiana, from 1948 to 1950 as the commanding general of U.S. Air Forces in Europe, from 1950 to 1951 as the commander-in-chief of U.S. Air Forces in Europe, and from 1951 to 1954 as the commanding general of Tactical Air Command at Langley Air Force Base in Virginia; and as a recipient of four Distinguished Service Medals, the Legion of Merit, the Bronze Star Medal and the Air Medal, among others
- Clovis Air Force Base was renamed in 1957 as Cannon Air Force Base in honor of Gen. John K. Cannon
- Not known to have affiliated politically with a party

=== Cavendish W. Cannon ===
February 1, 1895 to October 7, 1962

- Also known as Cavendish Wells Cannon
- Served from 1947 to 1958 as a member of the U.S. Foreign Service
- Not known to have affiliated politically with a party

== 20th century ==
=== Robert Milchrist Cannon ===
August 16, 1901 to September 3, 1976

- Also known as Robert M. Cannon
- Served in 1925 as a graduate of the U.S. Military Academy at West Point; from 1925 to 1961 as an officer of the U.S. Army, including with distinction in the China-Burma-India Theater of World War II under Gen. Joseph Stilwell, as the deputy commander and chief of staff for the Army Pacific, and as the commanding general of the Sixth Army at the Presidio of San Francisco; and as a recipient of the Distinguished Service Medal and the Bronze Star Medal, among others
- Not known to have affiliated politically with a party

=== T. Quentin Cannon ===
April 29, 1906 to May 18, 2004

- Also known as Thomas Quentin Cannon
- Served from 1969 to 1980 as a member of the Utah House of Representatives from Salt Lake County
- Affiliated politically with the Republican Party

=== Quayle Cannon Jr. ===
July 5, 1906 to August 28, 1990

- Served from 1941 to 1945 as a member of the Utah House of Representatives from Salt Lake County
- Affiliated politically with the Republican Party

=== Ray Cannon Needham ===
September 11, 1908 to October 29, 1979

- Also known as Raymond Cannon Needham
- Served from 1963 to 1979 as a vice admiral of the U.S. Navy; and as a recipient of the Navy Distinguished Service Medal, the Legion of Merit with Gold Star and Combat "V" Device, the American Campaign Medal, the European-African-Middle Eastern Campaign Medal, the Asiatic-Pacific Campaign Medal, the World War II Victory Medal, the American Defense Service Medal with Fleet Clasp Device, the Navy Occupation Service Medal with Asia Clasp Device, the China Service Medal, the National Defense Service Medal with Bronze Star Device, the Philippine Liberation Medal and the Order of the Star of Ethiopia avec plaque presented by Emperor Haile Selassie, among others.
- Not known to have affiliated politically with a party

=== Edwin Bennion Cannon ===
January 2, 1910 to November 12, 1963

- Served from 1951 to 1953 as a member of the Utah Senate from Salt Lake County
- Affiliated politically with the Republican Party

=== Evan J. Woodbury ===
October 14, 1910 to April 2, 2001

- Also known as Evan John Woodbury
- Served from 1955 to 1957 as a member of the Utah House of Representatives from Washington County; and in 1962 as a founding member of the Washington County, Utah, Water Conservancy District board of trustees
- Affiliated politically with the Democratic Party

=== Howard Cannon ===
January 26, 1912 to March 5, 2002

- Also known as Howard Walter Cannon
- Served in 1939 as a reference attorney for the Utah Senate; in 1940 as an attorney for Washington County, Utah; from 1942 to 1946 as a lieutenant general of the U.S. Army Air Forces; as an attorney of Las Vegas, 1949 to 1957; member of the U.S. Senate from Nevada, 1959 to 1983; in 1982 as a candidate for the U.S. Senate from Nevada, defeated; major general of the U.S. Air Force Reserve Command; and as a recipient of the Silver Star, the Legion of Merit, the Distinguished Flying Cross, the Purple Heart and the Air Medal, among others
- The Cannon Survey Center at the University of Nevada at Las Vegas was opened in 1977, and was named in honor of Howard W. Cannon
- The Reno-Tahoe International Airport Cannon Terminal was opened in 1994, and was named in honor of Howard W. Cannon
- Affiliated politically with the Democratic Party

=== Ralph S. Cannon ===
April 16, 1912 to August 25, 2006

- Also known as Ralph Steffensen Cannon
- Served from 1963 to 1965 and 1967 to 1969 as a member of the Utah House of Representatives from Davis County
- Affiliated politically with the Republican Party

=== Edwin Q. Cannon ===
May 6, 1918 to April 6, 2005

- Also known as Edwin Quayle "Ted" Cannon Jr.
- Served from 1947 to 1949 and 1957 to 1961 as a member of the Utah House of Representatives from Salt Lake County
- Affiliated politically with the Republican Party

=== D. James Cannon ===
December 8, 1919 to March 5, 1998

- Also known as Donald James "Jim" Cannon
- Served from 1957 to 1959 as a member of the Utah House of Representatives from Salt Lake County; in 1964 as the Republican nominee for governor of Utah governor, defeated; in 1967 as a candidate for mayor of Salt Lake City, defeated; and as the executive director of the Utah Travel Council where he coined the state slogan "the greatest snow on earth"
- Affiliated politically with the Republican Party

=== James H. Cannon, Jr. ===
January 1, 1927 to November 28, 2013

- Son of James H. Cannon (1890-1950)
- Army Air Force 1944-1947.
- General manager of Cannon Electric in Salem, Massachusetts, 1956-1960
- Founder of Cannon Guild, a harpsichord maker in Cambridge, Massachusetts

=== Russell Anderson Cannon ===
June 25, 1928 to March 17, 2014

- Served from 1993 to 1995 as a member of the Utah House of Representatives from Salt Lake County
- Affiliated politically with the Republican Party

=== Theodore L. Cannon Jr. ===
July 18, 1931 to June 2, 2009

- Also known as Theodore Lincoln "Ted" Cannon Jr.
- Served from 1979 to 1987 as the attorney for Salt Lake County
- Affiliated politically with the Republican Party

=== David Kent Winder ===
June 8, 1932 to May 19, 2009

- Also known as David K. Winder
- Served from 1979 to 2009 as a judge of the U.S. District Court for the District of Utah
- Not known to have affiliated politically with a party

=== Mark Wilcox Cannon ===
Born abt. 1936

- Also known as Mark W. Cannon, Ph.D.
- Served from 1985 to 1988 as a staff director of the federal Commission on the Bicentennial of the Constitution, and from 1972–1985 as an administrative assistant to the chief justice of the United States
- Not known to have affiliated politically with a party

=== John C. Pingree ===
Born abt. 1942

- Also known as John Pingree
- Serves as a member of the Utah State Charter School Board, and served as a member of the Utah State Board of Education and as the chief-executive officer of the Utah Transit Authority.
- Not known to have affiliated politically with a party

=== Joseph A. Cannon ===
Born July 31, 1949

- Also known as Joseph Angus "Joe" Cannon
- Served as a law clerk in Salt Lake City for U.S. District Judge Aldon J. Anderson; from 1983 to 1985 as an assistant administrator of the U.S. Environmental Protection Agency Office of Air and Radiation; in 1992 as a candidate for the U.S. Senate from Utah, defeated; from 2002 to 2006 as the chairman of the Utah Republican Party; and in 2004 as a Republican presidential elector from Utah
- Affiliated politically with the Republican Party

=== Chris Cannon ===
October 20, 1950 to May 8, 2024

- Also known as Christopher Black "Chris" Cannon
- Served from 1983 to 1986 as an assistant associate solicitor of the U.S. Department of Interior; from 1992 to 1994 as the finance chairman of the Utah Republican Party; from 1997 to 2009 as a member of the U.S. House of Representatives from Utah; and in 1998 as a manager of the U.S. House of Representatives impeachment of President Clinton
- Affiliated politically with the Republican Party

=== David Nelson ===
April 7, 1962 to June 11, 2024

- Also known as David Keith Nelson
- Served in 1985 as a candidate for the Salt Lake City Council, defeated; in 1996 and 2000 as a delegate to the Democratic National Convention; and from 1997 to 2001 as a member of the Hate Crimes Working Group for the U.S. Attorney for the District of Utah
- Unaffiliated politically with a party; was affiliated politically with the Democratic Party

=== Chet Cannon ===
Born February 6, 1985

- Also known as Chester "Chet" Cannon
- Graduated from the University of Utah and majored in finance; appeared in 2009 on the 21st season of MTV's The Real World: Brooklyn

== See also ==
- The Church of Jesus Christ of Latter-day Saints in the Isle of Man

== Sources ==
- Cannon, Robert J. "Bob." MBA's We Weren't: Memories and anecdotes of Cannon Electric 1915–1964, and the two men who ran it. Redlands, Calif.: Robert J. "Bob" Cannon. 1988.
- Evans, Beatrice Cannon and Janath Russell Cannon. Cannon Family Historical Treasury, Second Edition. George Cannon Family Association. Salt Lake City: Publishers Press Inc. 1995.
