= Maria Young Dougall =

Utah suffragist and LDS Church figure

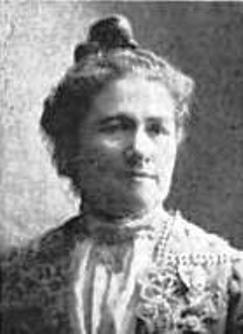

First Counselor in the general presidency of the Young Women
- 1887 – 1904
- Called by: Elmina Shepard Taylor
- Predecessor: Margaret Young Taylor
- Successor: Ruth May Fox

3rd President of the Daughters of the Utah Pioneers

In office
- April 24, 1905 – June 3, 1905
- Predecessor: Alice M. Horne
- Successor: Susa Y. Gates

Personal details
- Born: Clarissa Maria Young; December 10, 1849; Salt Lake City, Provisional State of Deseret, United States
- Died: April 30, 1935 (aged 85); Salt Lake City, Utah, United States
- Cause of death: Coronary occlusion
- Resting place: Salt Lake City Cemetery; 40.777°N 111.858°W
- Spouse(s): William B. Dougall
- Children: 6
- Parents: Brigham Young; Clarissa Ross

Clarissa Maria Dougall (née Young; December 10, 1849 – April 30, 1935) was a Utah suffragist and a member of the general presidency of what is today the Young Women organization of the Church of Jesus Christ of Latter-day Saints (LDS Church).

Maria Young was born in Salt Lake City to Brigham Young and his eighth wife, Clarissa Ross. When she was eight years old, her mother Clarissa died, so from that point forward she was raised by Zina D. H. Young, another of Brigham Young's wives.

Maria Young married William B. Dougall on June 1, 1868. She was at the foundational meeting of the LDS Church's Young Ladies' Department of the Cooperative Retrenchment Association in 1869. When Margaret Young Taylor, the first counselor in the Young Women organization, resigned her position in 1887 after the death of her husband, Dougall was selected to succeed Taylor. Dougall was the first counselor to Elmina Shepard Taylor from 1887 until Taylor's death on 6 December 1904. For many years, the meetings of the presidency of the Young Women was held in Dougall's home in Salt Lake City. When the Salt Lake Temple opened in 1893, Dougall became an ordinance worker.

After Utah gained statehood in 1896, Dougall was the chairperson of the Utah chapter of the National Council of Women, a suffrage organization led by Susan B. Anthony; in 1897 Dougall attended the NCW's large suffrage convention in Washington, D.C. Dougall was also a founding member and first counselor to Annie Taylor Hyde of the Daughters of Utah Pioneers organization.

Dougall died in Salt Lake City of a coronary occlusion. She was the mother of three children.

== See also ==
- Descendants of Brigham Young

== Notes ==
The Church of Jesus Christ of Latter-day Saints titles
Preceded by Margaret Young Taylor	First Counselor in the general presidency of the Young Women; 1887–1904	Succeeded by Ruth May Fox
Non-profit organization positions
Preceded by Alice M. Horne	3rd President of the Daughters of the Utah Pioneers; April 24, 1905–June 3, 1905	Succeeded by Susa Y. Gates
