= Tingey (surname) =

Tingey is a surname. Notable people with the surname include:

- Albert Tingey Sr. (1869–1953), British golfer
- Martha H. Tingey (1857–1938), American Mormon leader
- Thomas Tingey (1750–1829), United States Navy commodore
