= Mae Taylor Nystrom =

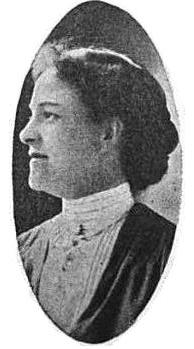

Second Counselor in the general presidency of the Young Women
- 1905 – 1923
- Called by: Martha H. Tingey
- Predecessor: Martha H. Tingey
- Successor: Lucy Grant Cannon

Personal details
- Born: August 11, 1871; Salt Lake City, Utah Territory
- Died: December 8, 1959 (aged 88); Salt Lake City, Utah
- Resting place: Salt Lake City Cemetery; 40.777°N 111.858°W
- Alma mater: LDS College
- Spouse(s): Theodore Nystrom
- Parents: George Hamilton Taylor; Anstis E. Shepard

Almira Mae Taylor Nystrom (August 11, 1871 - December 8, 1959) was a Utah suffragist and a member of the general presidency of what is today the Young Women organization of the Church of Jesus Christ of Latter-day Saints (LDS Church).

Mae Taylor was born in Salt Lake City, Utah Territory, to George Hamilton and Elmina Shepard Taylor, the first president of the church's Young Women organization. She attended the University of Utah for a year, but completed her course of study at LDS College and married Theodore Nystrom on 21 June 1900. They lived in Montpelier, Idaho, for two years.

In 1892, Nystrom had become a member of the general board of what was then called the Young Women's Mutual Improvement Association. She became its corresponding secretary in 1904, and then its treasurer. She continued in this position until 5 April 1905, when she was chosen by new president Martha H. Tingey as the second counselor in the organization. Nystrom was a counselor to Tingey until she was released on 15 July 1923 because of her move to Green River, Wyoming. She was succeeded in her position by Lucy Grant Cannon. Nystrom returned to live in Salt Lake City in 1929.she died in Salt Lake City Utah in 1959 at 88

Nystrom was a member of Susan B. Anthony's National Council of Women and was a delegate from Utah for to the suffragist organization's conventions in 1908 and 1909.

== Publications ==
- Nystrom, Mae Taylor "The Y.L.M.I.A. under President Elmina S. Taylor," Young Woman's Journal 36 (June 1925): 330.

== Notes ==
The Church of Jesus Christ of Latter-day Saints titles
Preceded by Martha H. Tingey	Second Counselor in the general presidency of the Young Women; April 1905 – July 1923	Succeeded by Lucy Grant Cannon
