= Florence S. Jacobsen =

American Mormon leader

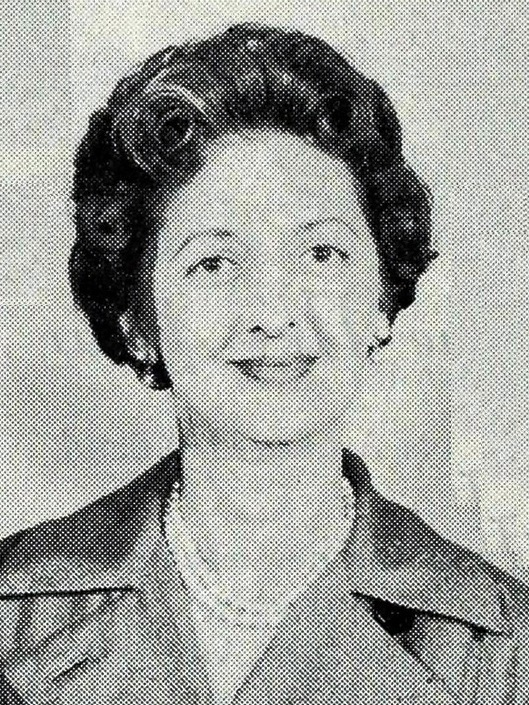
- Jacobsen in 1962

6th Young Women General President
- 1961 – 1972
- Called by: David O. McKay
- Predecessor: Bertha S. Reeder
- Successor: Ruth H. Funk

Personal details
- Born: Florence Smith; April 7, 1913; Salt Lake City, Utah, U.S.
- Died: March 5, 2017 (aged 103); Salt Lake City, Utah, U.S.
- Resting place: Wasatch Lawn Memorial Park, Salt Lake City, Utah, U.S.
- Alma mater: University of Utah
- Spouse(s): Ted Jacobsen
- Children: 3
- Parents: Willard Richards Smith; Florance Grant
- Relatives: Joseph F. Smith (grandfather); Heber J. Grant (grandfather)
- Awards: Junius F. Wells Award

Florence Smith Jacobsen (April 7, 1913 – March 5, 2017) was an American religious leader associated with the Church of Jesus Christ of Latter-day Saints (LDS Church) who served as the sixth General President of the Young Women's Mutual Improvement Association (YWMIA) from 1961 to 1972.

== Early years ==
Born in Salt Lake City, Utah, to Willard Richards Smith and Florence Grant Smith, Florence Smith was the granddaughter of two LDS Church presidents: Joseph F. Smith and Heber J. Grant. Smith attended the University of Utah and graduated in 1934. While at the university she was part of the Chi Omega sorority. She married Ted Jacobsen in the Salt Lake Temple in 1935.

== LDS Church service ==
In 1955, Ted Jacobsen was called as president of the church's Eastern States Mission of the church, and the family moved to New York City. In October 1961, Florence Jacobsen succeeded Bertha S. Reeder as general president of the church's YWMIA. Her aunt, Lucy Grant Cannon, had held the same position from 1937 to 1948. Jacobsen held this position until 1972, when she was released and succeeded by Ruth H. Funk.

During her tenure, the Beehive House and Lion House—which were operated by the YWMIA—were restored and opened to the public. In 1969, the YWMIA celebrated its centennial and in 1971, Jacobsen oversaw the launch of the New Era, the church's new magazine for youth.

In 1973, church president Harold B. Lee asked Jacobsen if she would become the LDS Church curator. Jacobsen accepted and became a key figure in the construction of the Museum of Church History and Art. As a church curator, Jacobsen supervised the restoration of many church buildings, including the Promised Valley Playhouse in Salt Lake City; the E. B. Grandin building in Palmyra, New York; the Brigham Young home in St. George, Utah; the Jacob Hamblin home in Santa Clara, Utah; the Newell K. Whitney store in Kirtland, Ohio; and the interior of the Manti Utah Temple.

On April 21, 2010, Jacobsen was awarded the Junius F. Wells Award by the Mormon Historic Sites Foundation. At that time, church president Thomas S. Monson and Boyd K. Packer, President of the Quorum of the Twelve Apostles, both spoke of Jacobsen's leadership in preserving historical sites for the LDS Church and her leadership in the Young Women organization. In regards to her leadership of the Young Women organization, Monson stated, "You lifted them to a higher plane, and anyone who's been lifted to a plane of excellence is never again content with mediocrity. That's not a word you have in your vocabulary—mediocrity. You've never known it, and you never will." Jacobsen was named an Honorary Life Member of the Utah State Historical Society.

== Personal life ==
Jacobsen and her husband were the parents of three sons. She turned 100 in April 2013 and died in March 2017 at the age of 103.

In 1998, the Jacobsen family established the Florence Smith Jacobsen Scholarship at the College of Social Work at the University of Utah. The scholarship is awarded based on "academically based community scholarship and service that focuses on issues of concern to women, with particular emphasis on strengthening families."

== See also ==
- Janet Peterson and LaRene Gaunt (1993). Keepers of the Flame: General Presidents of the Young Women (Salt Lake City: Deseret Book)
- Lavina Fielding, "Florence Smith Jacobsen: In Love with Excellence," Ensign, June 1977, pp. 25–26

The Church of Jesus Christ of Latter-day Saints titles
| Preceded by Bertha S. Reeder | Young Women General President; 1961–1972 | Succeeded by Ruth H. Funk |
