= Joseph Cannon =

Joseph Cannon or Joe Cannon may refer to:

- Joseph A. Cannon (born 1949), former chairman of the Utah Republican Party and former chairman of Geneva Steel
- Joseph Gurney Cannon (1836–1926), U.S. Representative from Illinois and Speaker of the U.S. House of Representatives; nicknamed "Uncle Joe"
- Joseph J. Cannon (1877–1945), Utah politician, newspaper editor, and LDS Church leader
- Joe Cannon (baseball) (Joseph Jerome Cannon, born 1953), Major League Baseball outfielder
- Joe Cannon (soccer) (born 1975), American goalkeeper
- Joseph Cannon (socialist), American labor leader and socialist politician
- Joe B. Cannon (born 1935), American politician in the Texas House of Representatives
