= Maria Young =

Maria Young may refer to:

- Maria Young Dougall (1849-1935), American suffragist and LDS member
- Polly Young (1749-1799), also known as Maria Young, English singer
