= Margaret Young Taylor =

American Church of Latter-Day Saints member and presidential plural wife

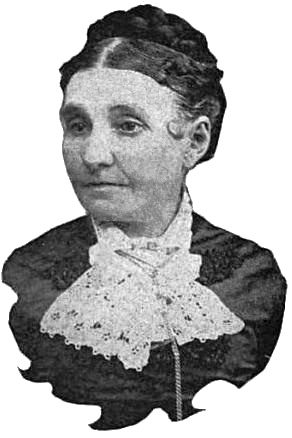
- Sketch of Margaret Young Taylor (ca. 1919)

First Counselor in the general presidency of the Young Women
- 1880 – 1887
- Called by: Elmina Shepard Taylor
- Successor: Maria Young Dougall

Personal details
- Born: Margaret Young; April 24, 1837; Westport, Connecticut
- Died: May 3, 1919 (aged 82); Salt Lake City, Utah
- Cause of death: stomach cancer
- Resting place: Salt Lake City Cemetery; 40.777°N 111.858°W
- Spouse(s): John Taylor
- Children: 9
- Parents: Ebenezer R. Young; Margaret Holden

Margaret Young Taylor (24 April 1837 – 3 May 1919) was a member of the inaugural general presidency of the Young Ladies' National Mutual Improvement Association, now the Young Women organization of the Church of Jesus Christ of Latter-day Saints (LDS Church) from 1880 to 1887. She was one of the plural wives of John Taylor, a president of the LDS Church.

== Life ==
Margaret Young was born in Westport, Connecticut on April 24, 1837, to Ebenezer Russell Young and Margaret Holden Young, the oldest of eight children. In November 1852, she converted to the Church of Jesus Christ of Latter-day Saints (LDS Church). She received her education at a young ladies seminary and became a schoolteacher in Westport when she was 18 years old. She met John Taylor while he was serving as president of the Eastern States mission for the LDS Church. On September 27, 1856 she married Taylor as a plural wife. They emigrated to Utah Territory in 1857 where she taught school for two years.

Taylor became secretary of the Salt Lake stake Relief Society upon its organization. In 1880, when Elmina Shepard Taylor became the first general president of the church's Young Ladies' National Mutual Improvement Association, Margaret Taylor was chosen as the first counselor in the presidency. After John Taylor died on 25 July 1887, Margaret Taylor resigned her position and was replaced by Maria Young Dougall.

Taylor died in Salt Lake City, Utah on May 3, 1919. She was the mother of nine of John Taylor's 34 children.

The Church of Jesus Christ of Latter-day Saints titles
| First | First Counselor in the general presidency of the Young Women; 1880 – 1887 | Succeeded by Maria Young Dougall |
