= Leonora Cannon Taylor =

Member of the Relief Society

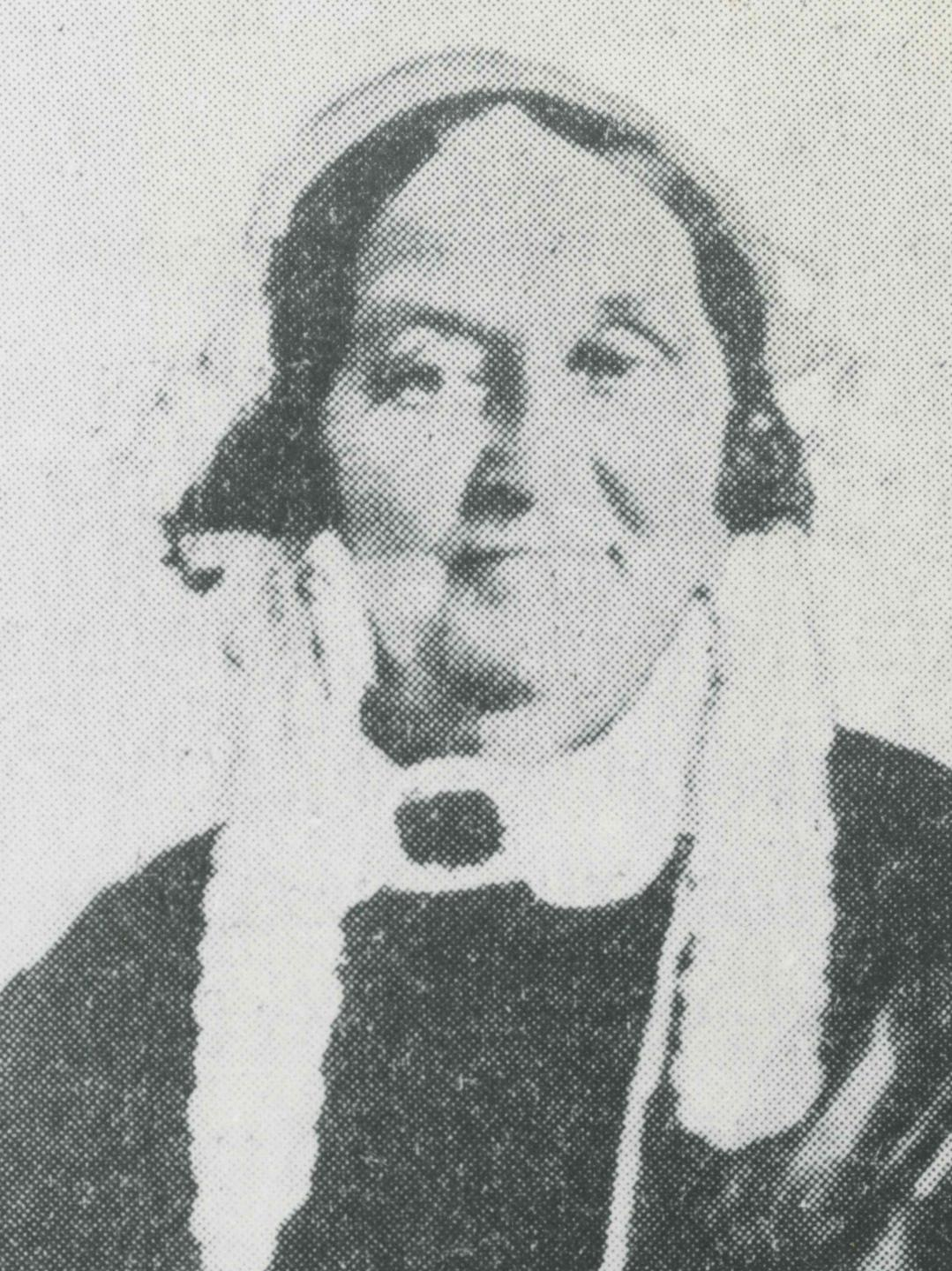
Portrait of Leonora Cannon Taylor

Leonora Cannon Taylor (October 6, 1796 – December 9, 1868) was born in the Isle of Man into a large family. After the death of her father, she moved to London where she joined the Methodist church. Later while living in Canada, she joined the Church of Jesus Christ of Latter-day Saints (LDS Church). In the church, Taylor was a member of the Relief Society organization at the time of its origin and the first wife of John Taylor, the third LDS Church president. Taylor and her husband had four children together. With her family, Taylor traveled across the United States to settle in Utah.

== Personal life ==
Leonora Cannon was born on October 6, 1796, in Peel, Isle of Man. She was the oldest daughter of George Cannon and Leonora Callister's nine children. Her father was a sea captain and provided his family a comfortable lifestyle. Cannon's father died when she was thirteen. After the death of her father, Cannon's mother rented out part of their house to an English family. Cannon became close friends with the family and was invited to go with them to London when they moved out of the Cannon house. Cannon spent her youth in London and was treated like a member of the Furnible family. Cannon received an education, she was presented at court, and had social relations with the "best of society." Leonora enjoyed learning and reading and was known by many for her wit.

From a young age, Cannon was spiritually minded. While in London, she explored religion and joined the Methodists. Her daughter reported that when Cannon joined the Methodist faith, she believed that curly hair was sinful so she promised God that she would never wear her curls again. Throughout her life, she did not wear her hair in curls again.

After her mother's death, Cannon lived with her sister and then returned to the Isle of Man. There, she met the secretary of the Governor-General of Canada and was offered the opportunity to move to Canada. After much prayer and studying of the Bible, Cannon moved to Canada. In Canada, she met John Taylor, a Methodist preacher at the time. When he proposed, Leonora rejected his first marriage proposal. At the time, Leonora was thirty-seven and John was twenty-five. After having a dream in which she saw herself with John, Leonora decided to accept the marriage proposal. The couple was married in Toronto, Canada in 1833.

After having two children, Taylor and her husband were introduced to the Latter Day Saint movement by Parley P. Pratt. The Taylors were baptized into the Church of Christ, the original name of the church founded by Joseph Smith, on May 9, 1836, and moved to America to join the other members of the church.

The couple traveled with and served in the church all their lives. They had eight children together, many of whom did not survive into adulthood. Taylor preceded her husband in death, dying of pneumonia in 1868 in Salt Lake City. There is a monument dedicated to Taylor and her husband. Taylor's obituary was published in multiple newspapers.

== LDS Church involvement ==
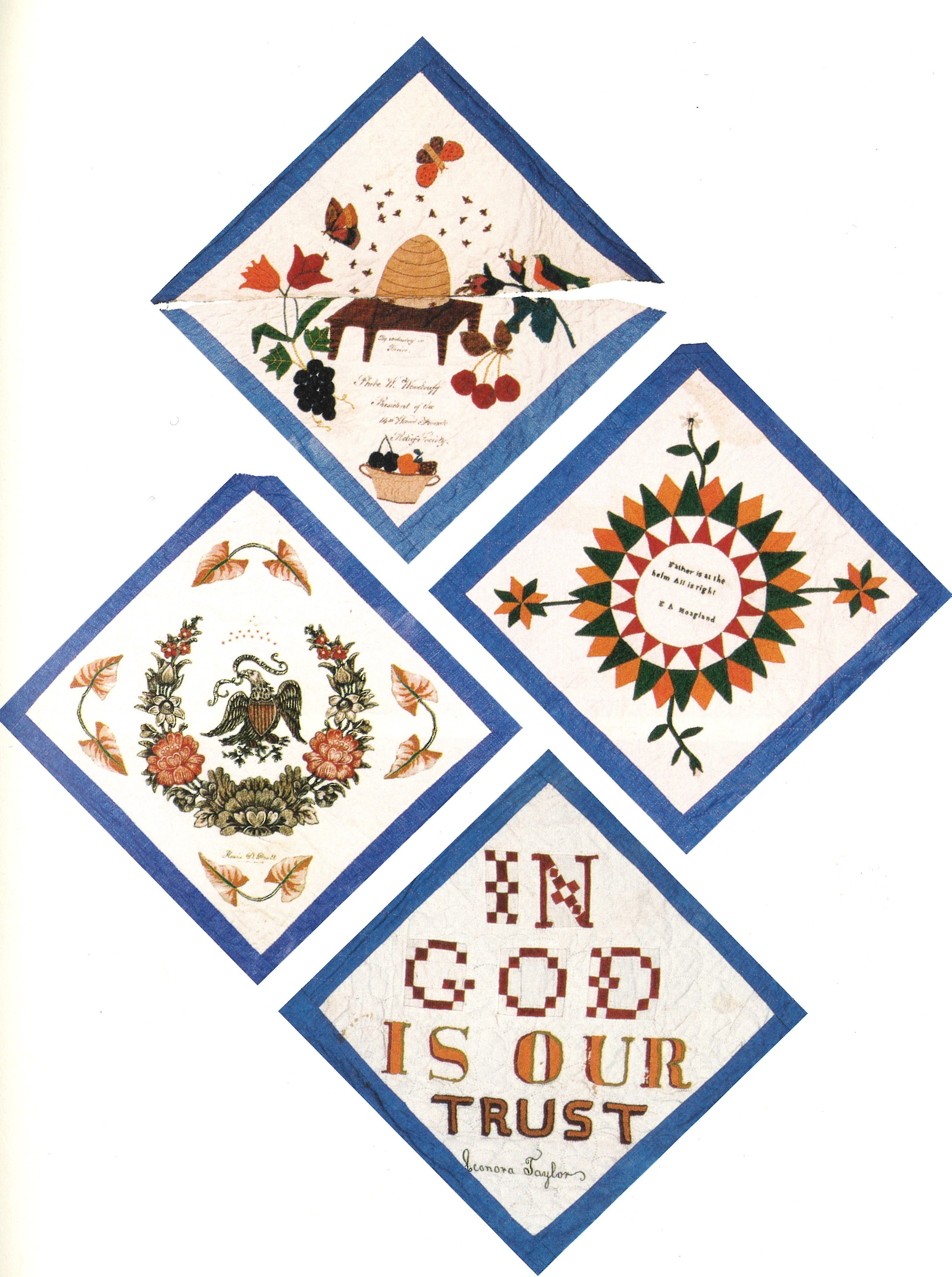
Quilt squares made by Phebe Woodruff, Ester Ann Hoagland, Leonora Taylor, and Kezia Pratt. The bottom square was made by Taylor and her sewn signature can be seen at the bottom of the square.

Following her baptism into the LDS Church, Taylor and her family traveled around the country with the members of the church throughout her life, living in Ohio, Missouri, Illinois, Iowa Territory, and Illinois and eventually settling in Salt Lake City, Utah. They moved often to escape religious persecution. During her journey, Taylor gave birth to more children. When the Taylors moved to America, they first arrived in Kirtland Ohio. While in Ohio, they were persecuted along with other members of the church. John then received an assignment as a missionary for the church in Britain. Shortly before John departed, Leonora became very ill. While John was a missionary in Europe, Leonora recovered from the sickness and continued to care for her family. Taylor would later describe this difficult time by saying, "I had gone through everything but death during his absence."

While Taylor was in Nauvoo, the practice of polygamy was introduced to the church. Taylor greatly struggled with the practice.

Taylor was an original member of the Relief Society when it was formed in March 1842. Taylor is said to be the first pioneer to plant fruit trees after arriving in the Utah territory, and had a large fruit tree orchard. She also participated in quilting with other members of the Relief Society. Throughout this time, Leonora cared for her family, especially her husband, John, who served in the church in many capacities. She was left alone with the children during her husband's missionary service in Great Britain and nursed him back to health when he was shot in the incident at Carthage Jail where Joseph and Hyrum Smith were killed. Following the assassinations, Taylor wrote a letter to the governor of Illinois, Thomas Ford, to ask for justice on behalf of the wounded and killed men in Carthage and to petition for protection from persecution for the members of the church. Her letter was publicly published in a newspaper. Taylor never received a reply to her letter.
