= Bertha S. Reeder =

5th general president of the Young Women
- 1948 – 1961
- Called by: George Albert Smith
- Predecessor: Lucy Grant Cannon
- Successor: Florence S. Jacobsen

Personal details
- Born: Bertha Julia Stone; October 28, 1892; Ogden, Utah Territory, United States
- Died: December 26, 1982 (aged 90); Pocatello, Idaho, United States
- Resting place: Ogden City Cemetery; 41.2325°N 111.9622°W
- Spouse(s): Christopher Aadnesen; William Henry Reeder, Jr. I. Lee Richard
- Children: at least 2
- Parents: Frederick N. Stone; Bertha Julia
- Website: Bertha S. Reeder

Bertha Julia Aadnesen Reeder Richards (née Stone; October 28, 1892 – December 26, 1982) was the fifth general president of the Young Women's Mutual Improvement Association of the Church of Jesus Christ of Latter-day Saints (LDS Church) from 1948 to 1961.

== Biography ==
Bertha Julia Stone was born on October 28, 1892, in Ogden, Utah Territory to Frederick Napper Stone and Bertha Julia. She attended Weber Academy after high school and married Christopher Aadnesen in 1912. The couple had two children. Christopher was killed in a hunting accident in 1930.

In 1934, Bertha married William Henry Reeder, Jr., a municipal judge who was a widower with one son. In 1941, William was called as the president of the New England States Mission of the church; the Reeders lived as church missionaries for nearly seven years in Cambridge, Massachusetts.

In April 1948, less than a year after returning to Ogden, Bertha Reeder succeeded Lucy Grant Cannon as the general president of the Young Women's Mutual Improvement Association. One of her counselors was Frances Larue Carr Longden. In March 1961, William Reeder died, and in September that year Bertha was released and was succeeded as Young Women president by Florence S. Jacobsen. During her tenure, the age groups in the Young Women organization were realigned to their current configuration and the "Gleaners" were renamed the "Laurels".

In 1964, Bertha married I.L. (Lee) Richards, a friend she had known for many years. Lee died in 1981, after which Bertha moved to Pocatello, Idaho, to be near her daughter. She died in Pocatello, aged 90. Her funeral was held in Ogden.

The Church of Jesus Christ of Latter-day Saints titles
Preceded by Lucy Grant Cannon	General President of the Young Women; 1948–1961	Succeeded by Florence S. Jacobsen
