= Abraham Hoagland =

American Mormon leader

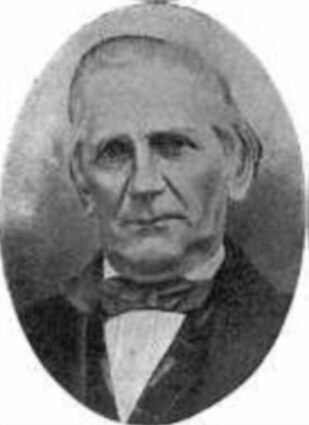

Personal details
- Born: March 24, 1797 Hillsborough Township, New Jersey
- Died: February 14, 1872 (aged 74) Salt Lake City, Utah
- Spouse(s): Margaret Quick; Agnes Taylor; Esther Luce; Rebecca Merrill

Abraham Lucas Hoagland (March 24, 1797 – February 14, 1872) was an early Mormon leader, pioneer, and one of the founders of Royal Oak, Michigan, and Salt Lake City, Utah, USA.

== Early life ==
Hoagland was born on March 24, 1797, in Hillsborough Township, New Jersey. He apprenticed as a blacksmith and moved to Michigan, where he became a prosperous blacksmith and farmer and helped settle present-day Royal Oak. While in Michigan, he joined the Church of Jesus Christ of Latter Day Saints in 1841.

== Church service ==
In 1843, he moved his family to Nauvoo, Illinois, where Joseph Smith ordained him an elder. Orson Pratt and Wilford Woodruff ordained him a bishop in Winter Quarters, Nebraska after the saints were driven from Nauvoo. In 1853 and 1857, Hoagland was elected an alderman of Salt Lake City. When Brigham Young sent John Murdock to open a mission in Australia in 1851, Hoagland took his place as bishop of the 14th ward in Salt Lake City, where he chose Wilford Woodruff's first wife, Phoebe, as the ward's first Relief Society president.

== Family and personal life ==
Hoagland began practicing plural marriage in 1847 when he married Agnes Taylor, the younger sister of later church president John Taylor. They divorced in 1861. Hoagland was the grandfather of Abraham H. Cannon and the father-in-law of both William Whitaker Taylor and George Q. Cannon. He was a member of Wilford Woodruff's prayer circle. He died of pneumonia on February 14, 1872, in Salt Lake City.
