= Ruth May Fox =

American politician (1853–1958)

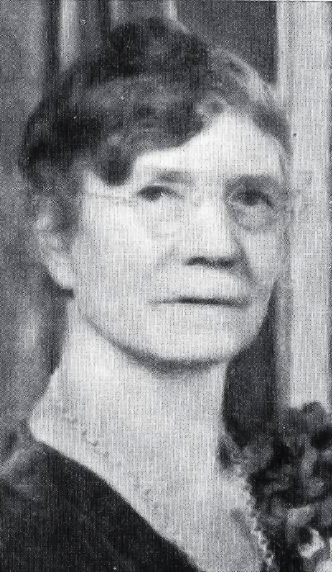
- Fox in 1936

3rd general president of the Young Women
- 1929 – 1937
- Called by: Heber J. Grant
- Predecessor: Martha H. Tingey
- Successor: Lucy Grant Cannon

First Counselor in the general presidency of the Young Women
- 1905 – 1929
- Called by: Martha H. Tingey
- Predecessor: Maria Young Dougall
- Successor: Lucy Grant Cannon

Personal details
- Born: Ruth May; November 16, 1853; Westbury, Wiltshire, England
- Died: April 12, 1958 (aged 104); Salt Lake City, Utah, U.S.
- Resting place: Salt Lake City Cemetery; 40.777°N 111.858°W
- Spouse(s): Jesse William Fox
- Children: 12

Ruth Fox (née May; November 16, 1853 – April 12, 1958) was a 19th-century English-born American women's rights activist in the Territory of Utah. Fox was a poet, hymn writer, and a leader of youth in the Church of Jesus Christ of Latter-day Saints (LDS Church).

== Early life ==
Ruth May was born in Westbury, Wiltshire, England to James May and Mary Ann (née Harding) May. Her father worked in a mine and a factory. Though they were not educated, May's parents were religious. They converted to Mormonism when May was five months old. May's mother then died in childbirth when she was 16 months old. May was sent to live with various relatives and Mormon families while her father was a traveling missionary. Before her eighth birthday, she had lived in seven different households. Lacking parental consistency, May often misbehaved as a child. At one point she accidentally set her hair on fire, and another time she stepped in front of an oncoming train.

At age eight, May moved with her father to Yorkshire to live a boarding house run by Mary Saxton. Saxton had a daughter May's age named Clara, and the two became friends. As an older child, May enjoyed reciting poetry and telling stories and working alongside Clara Saxton. After her father refused to give her permission to work in a factory, May assisted the Saxtons in performing various chores around the boarding house.

In 1865, James May emigrated to the United States and shortly thereafter sent for Ruth, Mrs. Saxton, and Clara. On their arrival in Philadelphia, James May married Mrs. Saxton, and he and the two girls found work in a textile mill to save money to go to Utah Territory. In 1867 the May family traveled by covered wagon and on foot to Salt Lake City with Leonard Rice's company. She chiseled her name into Independence Rock in Wyoming during the journey. The Mays arrived in the Salt Lake Valley in August 1867. After settling in the Ogden area, Ruth attended John Morgan's College in Salt Lake City for four months. When her father bought a mill in Salt Lake City, Ruth worked for him operating equipment usually run by men. She felt that she should be paid a man's wages for the job; she was paid a lower wage as a woman.

== Family ==
On May 8, 1873, Ruth May married Jesse W. Fox, Jr., a civil engineer, in the Endowment House. She was nineteen years old. In 1888, Jesse Fox married Rosemary Johnson as a plural wife without Ruth's permission, although for most of his life, Jesse resided with Ruth. He worked as a surveyor, and the family enjoyed financial security. Fox eventually became the mother of twelve children: six girls and six boys.

In the Panic of 1893, Jesse Fox lost his dry goods business and the family home, but not their farm. After this period of financial difficulty, Jesse moved to live with his other wife, and Fox was on her own to provide for her children. In 1900, she managed the Saint Omer Boarding house. In 1914, she worked as a typist for the LDS church's Young Ladies' Mutual Improvement Association (YLMIA). During her time as a typist, her father's health was declining, and Ruth rented a home for her and her father near the YLMIA offices. Her husband then died in 1928. She also lived with her children and worked as a housekeeper during this time.

In 1953, she had over 200 direct descendants.

== Women's suffrage and civil service ==
Fox continued her education through observation and personal study. She composed poetry, which first appeared in print in 1891, at which time she joined the Press Club, a women's literary organization. She later became president of the Utah Woman's Press Club. She was a member of Emmeline B. Wells's Reapers Club, which encouraged the social and intellectual development of women. Fox considered herself a disciple of Wells, who inspired Fox to become more active in the women's suffrage movement. She served alongside Wells in the Utah Territorial Women's Suffrage Association, established in 1893.

Fox actively promoted the women's suffrage movement in Utah and did so largely as an organizer of Republican Party in Utah. She was president of the Utah Woman's Press Club, chair of the Second Precinct Ladies' Republican Club, treasurer of the Utah Woman Suffrage Association, and was a member of the Salt Lake County Republican Committee and the Traveler's Aid Society. Fox and Emmeline B. Wells met with Susan B. Anthony and Anna Howard Shaw when they visited Salt Lake City on May 12, 1895.

In the late 19th century she worked for the inclusion of woman suffrage in the Utah state constitution and helped draft the suffrage memorial presented and accepted by the 1895 Utah constitutional convention. She created petitions for this effort. Her work resulted in success; the U.S. congress passed Utah's new constitution, granting women in the state the right to vote. Fox also published a few poems in newspapers.

Heber Manning Wells, the first governor of Utah, appointed Fox as a director of the Deseret Agricultural and Manufacturing Society, a position which she held for eight years. During this time, she helped invigorate the Utah State fair. She was active in serving for the American Red Cross in Utah. She served on the executive board. During the influenza epidemic of 1917 she served as a volunteer nurse to the sick. During World War I, she served as lieutenant of canteens in Salt Lake City.

== Church leadership ==
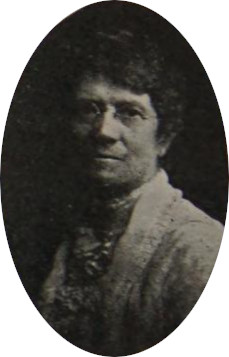
Fox during her service as first counselor in the YLMIA

In 1905, Fox was asked to be the first counselor to Martha Horne Tingey in the general presidency of the YLMIA. In 1923 the YLMIA general board published a volume of Fox's poetry under the title May Blossoms. Fox served as first counselor in the YLMIA until 1929, when she became the third general president of the YLMIA under church president Heber J. Grant at the age of 75. She expressed concern over serving in this capacity at her age, but Grant assured her in a blessing that she would have "the same vigor of body and of mind" as when she was young.

During Fox's tenure as president, a number of changes to the young women's program occurred. In 1934, the name of the young women's program changed to the Young Women's Mutual Improvement Association (YWMIA). Twelve and thirteen-year-old girls became beehives in the YWMIA instead of Mi-Kan-Wees in Primary. They could purchase a uniform similar to the Boy Scout uniform. She changed the Lion House into a "home for girls" for them to socialize and attend classes in religion and writing; some 50 out-of-town young women lived there. Fox sponsored a Traveling Library Program. As part of her duties as leader of the YLMIA, Fox visited and taught women all over the world in their local wards. She visited Hawaii, Europe, Canada, and Mexico.

In 1930, Fox wrote the hymn "Carry On" for the centennial celebration of the church. The song provided a boost in morale for the young people in the church at the outset of the Great Depression. In 1995, "Carry On" was adopted by Gordon B. Hinckley as the theme of his tenure as President of the Church.

Fox served until 1937, when she was succeeded by her own first counselor, Lucy Grant Cannon. She was almost 84 years old. She had served on the general board of the YWMIA for 39 years.

== Later life, death, and legacy ==
Fox's 85th, 90th, 95th, and 100th birthday parties were held in the Beehive House. Members of the First Presidency and the Council of the Twelve Apostles of the LDS Church, as well as city and state leaders attended. She was 103 when she flew on an airplane to celebrate the golden wedding anniversary of one her sons.

Fox died in Salt Lake City on April 12, 1958, at the age of 104. Fox said: "Life brings some hard lessons. The sturdiest plants are not grown under glass, and strength of character is not derived from the avoidance of problems." Her descendant Brittany A. Chapman, a historian with the LDS Church History Department, gave a lecture on Fox's life in 2010 at the Church History Library.

== Publications ==
=== Articles ===
- "Mrs. Emeline Y. Nebeker". Relief Society Magazine. 17 (2): 61–63. February 1930.
- "Mary Connelly Kimball". Relief Society Magazine. 17 (10): 543–545. October 1930.
- "Women in Industry". Relief Society Magazine. 17 (11): 585–590. November 1930.
- "A Word to Mothers". Relief Society Magazine. 18 (10): 565–566. October 1931.
- "What Did the Prophet Joseph Smith Do For Women?". Relief Society Magazine. 23 (12): 750–752. December 1936.
- "The Law of the Lord". Relief Society Magazine. 25 (7): 470–471. July 1938.

=== Dialogue ===
- "Our Girls: A Parable of the Ten Talents". Young Women's Journal. 17 (4). 172. April 1906.

=== Poetry ===
- "Aunt Em's Birthday". Relief Society Magazine. 9 (2): 60. February 1922.
- "A Tribute to Sister Susa Y. Gates". Relief Society Magazine. 9 (8): 399. August 1922.
- "Cumorah". Relief Society Magazine. 10 (9): 425. September 1923.
- "Where is Heaven?". Relief Society Magazine. 12 (3): 111. March 1925.
- "Where is Heaven?". Relief Society Magazine. 13 (10): 493. October 1926.

The Church of Jesus Christ of Latter-day Saints titles
| Preceded by Martha H. Tingey | General President of the Young Women; December 6, 1904 – 1929 | Succeeded by Lucy Grant Cannon |
| Preceded by Maria Young Dougall | First Counselor in the general presidency of the Young Women; 1905–1929 | Succeeded by Lucy Grant Cannon |
