= William W. Taylor =

American politician

William Whitaker Taylor
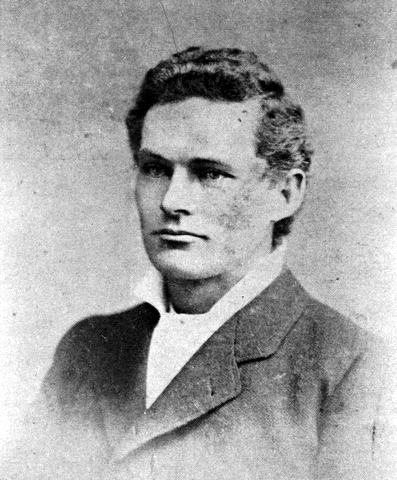

First Seven Presidents of the Seventy
- April 7, 1880 – August 1, 1884
- Called by: John Taylor

Utah Territorial Legislature

In office
- 1883 – 1884

Assessor and Collector of Taxes for Salt Lake City, Utah

In office
- 1884

Personal details
- Born: September 11, 1853; Salt Lake City, Utah Territory
- Died: August 1, 1884 (aged 30); Salt Lake City, Utah Territory
- Spouse(s): Sarah Taylor Hoagland; Selma van Cott

William Whitaker Taylor (September 11, 1853 – August 1, 1884) was a member of the Utah Territorial Legislature, member of the Presidency of the Seventy in the Church of Jesus Christ of Latter-day Saints (LDS Church), and a son of LDS Church president John Taylor. He was a half brother to John W. Taylor, a member of the Quorum of the Twelve Apostles who was dropped from the body and excommunicated for refusing to give up plural marriage, and a brother-in-law to George Q. Cannon.

William served a mission in England with his half brother John, but before leaving married the youngest daughter of Abraham Hoagland and Agnes Taylor, 20-year-old Sarah Taylor Hoagland, with whom he eventually had six children.

William reported that while crossing the ocean with John on the Steamship Dakota on the way to England, he had a dream in which Jesus Christ appeared to him, took him by the hand, looked in his face, and asked "Will you ever doubt again?"

Two years after returning from his mission, William was named one of the First Seven Presidents of the Seventy at the age of 26. Soon thereafter he was also appointed to the Council of Fifty.

Despite the near-universal view that John Taylor refused compromise on plural marriage, over a third of general authorities appointed under Taylor were monogamists, including William and his half brother. It wasn't until just before his death that William took on a plural wife, Selma van Cott, daughter of fellow Seventies president John Van Cott.

In addition to his rise within the church, William was elected to the Utah Territorial Legislature in the 1883 general election. Within months, he was also elected assessor and collector of taxes for Salt Lake City in February 1884. However, on a Saturday evening that summer, he was attacked with "bilious colic" and died from the effects within a week. He left six children, eight years and under, from his first wife and none from his second.

Given his meteoric rise in church and public office, one historian commented that Taylor would be much better known if his life hadn't ended at such an early age. His father, who was president of the LDS Church at the time, said in his obituary "I cannot think of anything which I wish he had done differently." John Morgan took his place as one of the presidents of the Seventy.

At Taylor's funeral in the Salt Lake Tabernacle, Wilford Woodruff, Robert T. Burton, Joseph F. Smith, George Q. Cannon, and John Taylor each spoke.

== See also ==
- Cannon Family (political family)
