= Agnes Taylor =

American Mormon pioneer (1821–1911)

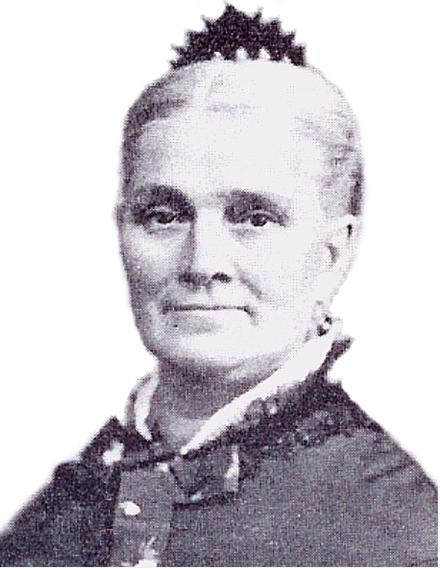

Personal details
- Born: October 2, 1821 Westmoreland, England
- Died: December 12, 1911 (aged 90) Salt Lake City, Utah
- Spouse(s): John Rich; Abraham Hoagland; Wilhelm Schwartz

Agnes Taylor Rich Hoagland Schwartz (October 2, 1821 – December 11, 1911) was a Mormon pioneer who played a key role in helping her brother, LDS Church president John Taylor, evade authorities during the federal crackdown on polygamy in the mid-1880s. She was also the mother-in-law of later church president Joseph F. Smith and of William W. Taylor, and a wife of Abraham Hoagland.

== Early life and first marriage ==
Taylor was born to James and Agnes Taylor in an English village called Hale in Westmorland. Her older brother, John, would later become president of the Church of Jesus Christ of Latter-day Saints.

In 1838, 17-year-old Taylor married John Rich in Carthage, Illinois. They eventually settled in Nauvoo and had four children before divorcing when Taylor wanted to go west with the main body of Latter Day Saints in the late 1840s.

== Second marriage ==
On 26 January, 1846, Taylor married John Benbow in the Nauvoo temple, Nauvoo, Hancock, Illinois. She divorced him 26 May 1847.

== Third marriage ==
On 13 September 1847, Taylor married 50-year-old Abraham Hoagland at age 26. They had five children together before divorcing in 1861 upon the recommendation of Brigham Young. Their daughter Sarah married Taylor's nephew, William Whitaker Taylor.

== Fourth marriage ==
In 1862, Taylor was 41 when she married Wilhelm Schwartz, a 24-year-old Prussian immigrant. They had two children together, the second of whom, Mary Taylor Schwartz, married 43-year-old Joseph F. Smith in 1884 at the age of 18.

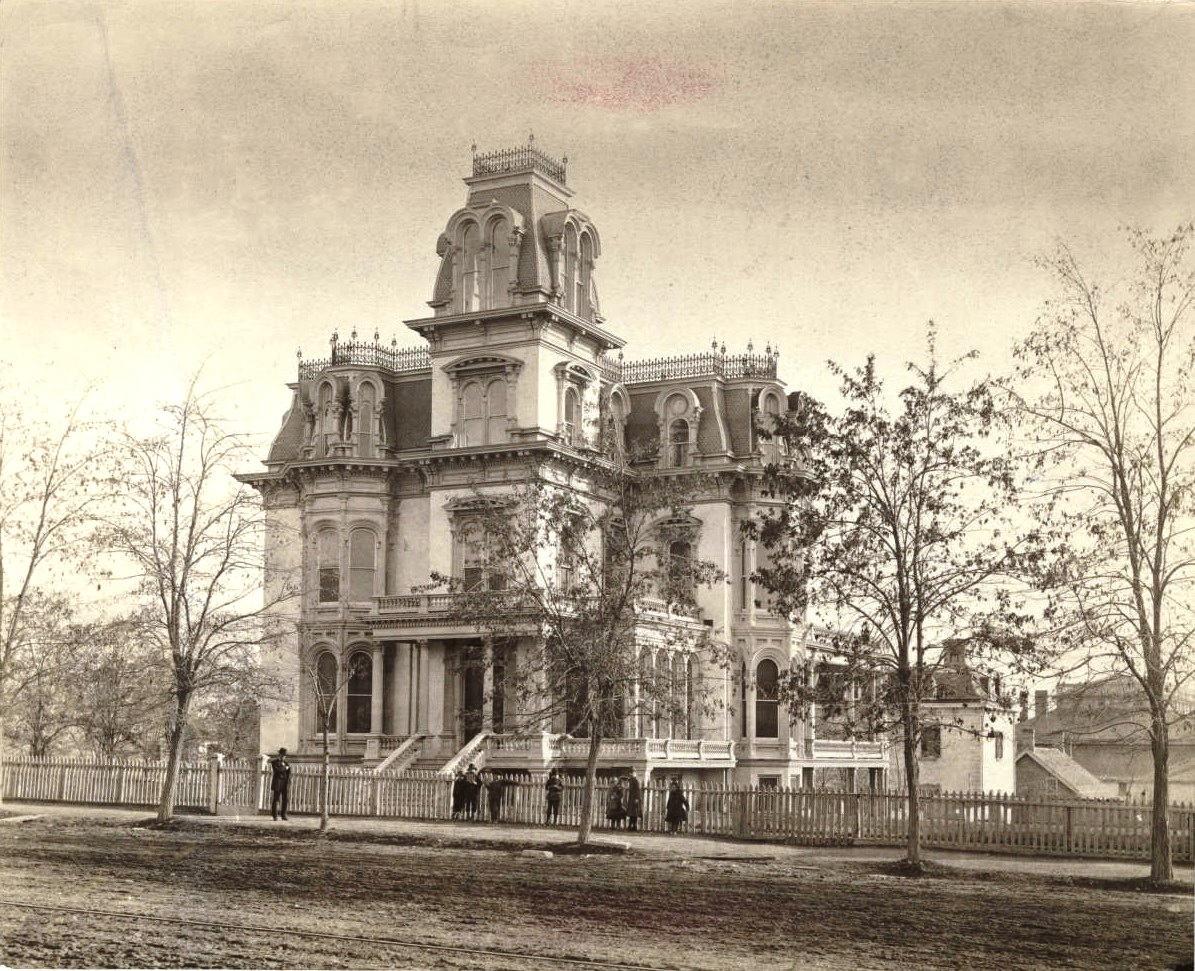
Gardo House, Salt Lake City, Utah

== Protecting her brother ==
After Brigham Young died in 1877, Taylor's brother succeeded him as president of the Church of Jesus Christ of Latter-day Saints. John Taylor reluctantly moved into the Gardo House in 1882, three years after church members voted to make the then-uncompleted mansion the official parsonage for church presidents.

In 1882, Congress passed the Edmunds Act, which made polygamy a felony and posed a serious threat to Utah's long-stalled bid for statehood. Shortly after the law was passed, John Taylor called 16 general authorities to a meeting at the Gardo House. According to attendee Wilford Woodruff, "President Taylor with the rest of us came to the conclusion that we could not swap off the Kingdom of God or any of its Laws or Principles for a state government."

Despite the church's decision to continue business as usual, John Taylor made an effort to comply with the Edmunds Act by moving his families out of the mansion and bringing his sister Agnes in to take over its management while he continued his duties as president.

Federal enforcement pressure increased, forcing John Taylor to withdraw from public view and go "underground": frequently on the move to avoid arrest. In March 1885, soon after his final public appearance, federal marshals made a massive raid on the house to capture him. This and subsequent raids were unsuccessful, and his "tough-minded sister ... often held raiding marshals and deputies at bay at the front door of the mansion, admitting no one unless he presented papers properly signed by a federal judge."

After her brother's 1887 death while still underground, Taylor vacated the house.

== Death and legacy ==
Taylor died on December 12, 1911, in Salt Lake City, Utah. Joseph F. Smith, Francis M. Lyman, Charles W. Penrose, Frank Y. Taylor, and Hyrum M. Smith each spoke at her funeral.
