= Martha H. Tingey =

American religious leader (1857–1938)

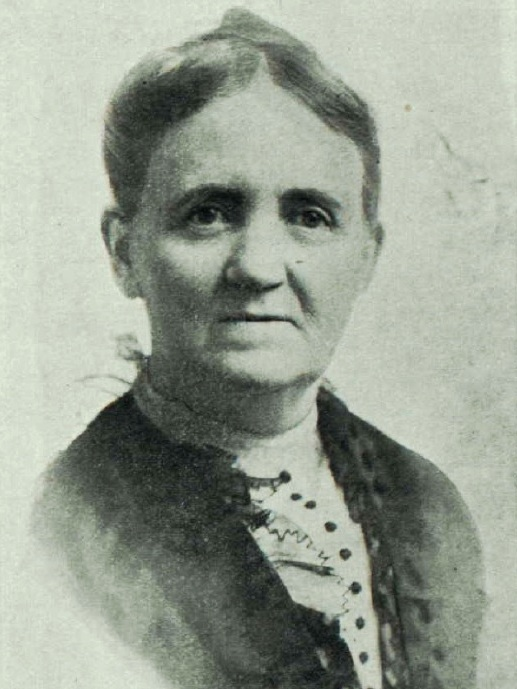

2nd general president of the Young Women
- April 4, 1905 – March 28, 1929
- Predecessor: Elmina Shepard Taylor
- Successor: Ruth May Fox
- End reason: Own request for release due to ill health.

Second Counselor in the general presidency of the Young Women
- 1880 – 1904
- Called by: Elmina Shepard Taylor
- Successor: Mae Taylor Nystrom

Personal details
- Born: Martha Jane Horne; October 15, 1857; Salt Lake City, Utah Territory, United States
- Died: March 11, 1938 (aged 80); Salt Lake City, Utah, United States
- Cause of death: Cerebral hemorrhage
- Resting place: Salt Lake City Cemetery; 40.777°N 111.858°W
- Spouse(s): Joseph S. Tingey
- Children: 7
- Parents: Joseph Horne; Mary I. Hales
- Website: Martha H. Tingey

Martha Jane Tingey (née Horne; October 15, 1857 – March 11, 1938) was the second general president of the Young Ladies' Mutual Improvement Association (YLMIA) of the Church of Jesus Christ of Latter-day Saints (LDS Church) from 1905 to 1929. She spent a total of 49 years as a member of the general presidency.

== Biography ==
Martha Jane Horne was born in Salt Lake City, Utah Territory. In 1880, as a single 22-year-old, Horne was asked to become the second counselor to Elmina Shepard Taylor in the YLMIA. Horne served in this capacity for 24 years. During her time as a counselor to Taylor, Horne married Joseph S. Tingey.

On December 6, 1904, Taylor died. Early in 1905, Tingey was selected as Taylor's successor as the general president of what by then had been renamed the Young Ladies' Mutual Improvement Association. Tingey's counselors in the presidency included Ruth May Fox and Lucy Grant Cannon, both of whom would go on to serve as presidents of the YLMIA. In 1929, Tingey was released from her position as president and was succeeded by Fox, her first counselor. Tingey had been a member of the general presidency from age 22 to age 72.

During her tenure as president, the YLMIA instituted yearly slogans, roadshows, the Beehive program, and camps for young women. In 1922, Tingey selected green and gold as the organization's official colors.

Tingey died in Salt Lake City from a cerebral hemorrhage.

== Notes ==
The Church of Jesus Christ of Latter-day Saints titles
Preceded by Elmina Shepard Taylor	General President of the Young Women; April 1905 – April 1929	Succeeded by Ruth May Fox
First	Second Counselor in the general presidency of the Young Women; 1880 – 1904	Succeeded by Mae Taylor Nystrom
