= Lucy Grant Cannon =

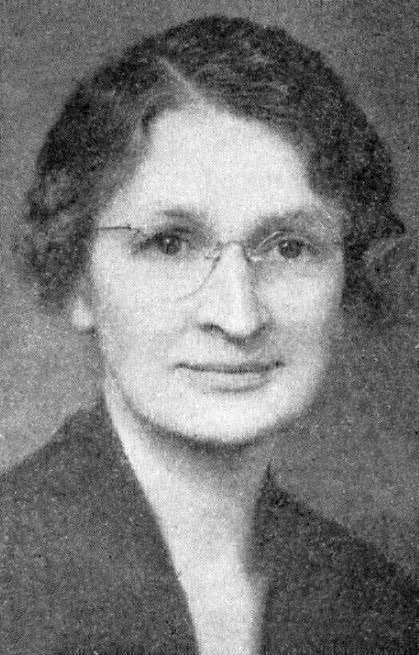

4th general president of the Young Women
- 1937 – 1948
- Called by: Heber J. Grant
- Predecessor: Ruth May Fox
- Successor: Bertha S. Reeder

First Counselor in the general presidency of the Young Women
- 1929 – 1937
- Called by: Ruth May Fox
- Predecessor: Ruth May Fox
- Successor: Helen S. Williams

Second Counselor in the general presidency of the Young Women
- 1923 – 1929
- Called by: Martha H. Tingey
- Predecessor: Mae Taylor Nystrom
- Successor: Clarissa A. Beesley

Personal details
- Born: October 22, 1880; Salt Lake City, Utah Territory, United States
- Died: May 27, 1966 (aged 85); Salt Lake City, Utah, United States
- Resting place: Salt Lake City Cemetery; 40.777°N 111.858°W
- Spouse(s): George Jenkins Cannon
- Children: 7 including George I. Cannon
- Parents: Heber J. Grant; Lucy Stringham
- Website: Lucy Grant Cannon

Lucy Cannon (née Grant; October 22, 1880 – May 27, 1966) was the fourth general president of the Young Women organization of the Church of Jesus Christ of Latter-day Saints (LDS Church) from 1937 to 1948. She was a member of the general presidency of the Young Women from 1923 to 1948, serving as a counselor to two presidents.

== Biography ==
Lucy Grant was born in Salt Lake City, Utah Territory to Lucy Stringham and LDS Church apostle Heber J. Grant. She served as a church missionary in the Western States Mission of the church in 1901. In 1902, Grant married George J. Cannon.

In 1923, Cannon was asked to succeed Mae Taylor Nystrom as the second counselor to Martha Horne Tingey, the general president of what was then called the Young Ladies' Mutual Improvement Association. In 1929, when Ruth May Fox succeeded Tingey, Cannon was asked to be her first counselor. Cannon served in this capacity until 1937, when Fox was released and Cannon was selected by her father, who was President of the Church, to be the fourth general president of what had been renamed the Young Women's Mutual Improvement Association. Cannon served until 1948, when she was succeeded by Bertha Stone Reeder.

Cannon and her husband were the parents of seven children. Their son George I. Cannon was a general authority of the church from 1986 to 1991. Lucy Grant Cannon died in Salt Lake City.

The Church of Jesus Christ of Latter-day Saints titles
Preceded by Ruth May Fox	General President of the Young Women; 1937—1948	Succeeded by Bertha S. Reeder
Preceded by Ruth May Fox	First Counselor in the general presidency of the Young Women; 1929—1937	Succeeded by Helen S. Williams
Preceded by Mae Taylor Nystrom	Second Counselor in the general presidency of the Young Women; 1923—1929	Succeeded by Clarissa A. Beesley
