= National Monument to the U.S. Constitution =

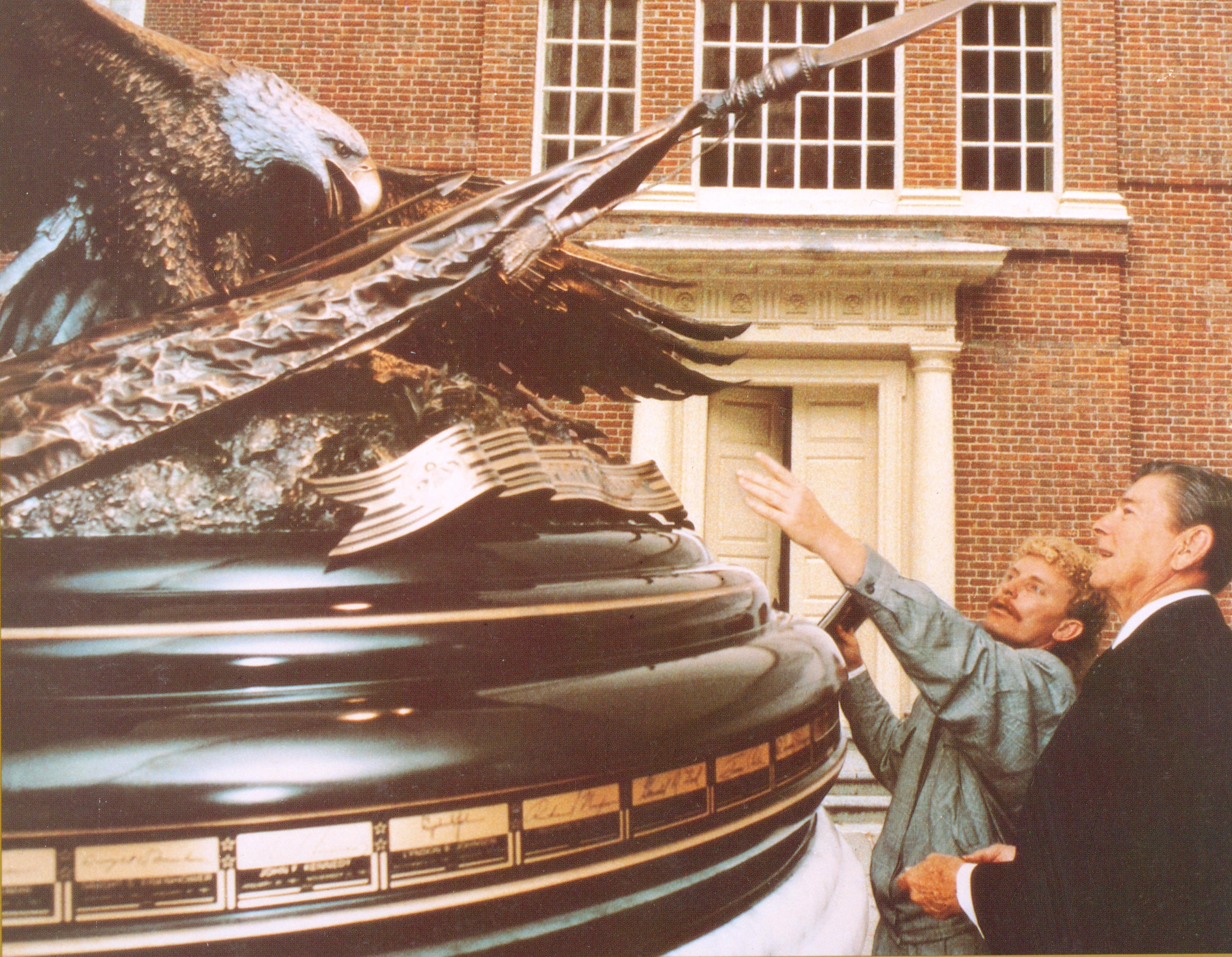
National Monument to the US Constitution dedicated by President Ronald Reagan on September 17, 1987 at Independence Hall in Philadelphia, PA.

The National Monument to the U.S. Constitution (also known as the Constitution Bicentennial Monument) was monument commissioned to Australian artist Brett-Livingstone Strong by Warren E. Burger, Chairman of the Commission on the Bicentennial of the United States Constitution, to commemorate the 200th anniversary of the signing of the United States Constitution. One of a pair created by Strong to commemorate historic anniversaries, along with The United States Presidency Monument, it was dedicated by President Ronald Reagan at Independence Hall in Philadelphia on September 17, 1987. Both monuments were the property of the Global EventMakers, Inc., a Florida-based company with principal offices in Henrico, Virginia. Over the years the monument has been transported for display purposes to several major public events around the country. In 1991 it was scheduled to begin a twenty-city traveling exposition as part of the Spirit of Freedom Tour. Due to the withdrawal of sponsorship funding, the tour never commenced. The Monument was on display at the Ronald Reagan library and museum for a period of time from 2003-2005 and was clearly visible for most pictures while the President lay in state in June 2004. The Monument's companion original replicas of the United States Constitution and Bill of Rights are being produced for placement in America's schools through the National Constitution Plaque Initiative an American Constitution Spirit Foundation (501c3) initiative. All user rights to the Constitution Monument and the Original Replicas of the Constitution exclusive user rights were transferred to The American Constitution Spirit Foundation, a Virginia non-profit, in March 2010. Upon dissolvement of Global EventMakers in 2008 all rights and ownership of both monuments were transferred to Lawrence A Creeger, an Henrico County Virginia resident who was the 100% stockholder of Global EventMakers.

== Description ==
The National Monument to the US Constitution is 8' 4" tall, weighing 7 tons. The cast bronze, granite, and marble monument was sculpted by Brett Livingstone Strong, circa 1987.The monument consists of a bald eagle landing from flight carrying the American Flag and draping it over the monument, symbolizing the American people preserving, protecting, and defending their Constitution. The monument is constructed of poly-chrome and paginated cire perdue (lost wax) cast silicon bronze on a polished marble and granite pedestal. The flag is attached to the "Spear of Might" which is held in the right talon of the eagle along with the "arrows of protection" symbolizing the strength of the United States. The eagle's left talon clutches an olive branch, a symbol of peace. Bronze tree roots on the base go deep into the core of the foundation representing strength and stability. Exact replicas of the signers of the United States Constitution are circumscribed on the circular plinth between the bronze eagle and the granite pedestal. The octagonal pedestal is constructed of white marble and red and blue granite with white marble stars arranged to symbolize the American Flag. At the front of the pedestal is a bronze depiction of the eagle resplendent with the national motto " E Pluribus Unum" surrounded by a circle of fifty stars.

== Origin ==
In the late 1980s, the Commission on the Bicentennial of the United States Constitution conceived of two monuments to commemorate United States history, one celebrating the 200th anniversary of the signing of the Constitution and another the 200th anniversary of the establishment of the U.S. presidency. Australian artist Brett Livingstone Strong was commissioned by former Chief Justice Warren E. Burger, who served as chairman of that Commission, to produce these monuments. At that time, the Commission intended that the monument would travel across the country as part of the national celebrations of the Constitution's bicentennial beginning in 1987.

The National Monument to the U.S. Constitution was officially dedicated at its unveiling at Independence Hall in Philadelphia by Ronald Reagan on the bicentennial, September 17, 1987. Both monuments were officially recognized, along with the five bronze original replica plaques, by the artist, of the U.S. Constitution and the Bill of Rights.

== Subsequent history ==
In 1989, both the National Monument to the U.S. Constitution and the United States Presidency Monument were the property of the American Spirit Corporation, affiliated with the non-profit American Spirit Foundation. The following information is inaccurate (In 1990, the American Spirit Corporation allowed a lien to be placed on the monument to the U.S. Presidency collateral for unpaid attorneys fees of $110,000.00 owed to a law firm in Los Angeles, CA). Subsequently, the foundation was dissolved and the two monuments were owned by different parties until they were reunited in 2004.

== Display ==
Although the monument did not tour as planned in 1987, it was displayed in a parade celebrating the bicentennial in Philadelphia. It was also featured at the "Spirit of Freedom Country Music Festival" in The Plains, Virginia in 1989 and, in 1991, the Tournament of Roses Parade. The monument was taken to Richmond, Virginia where in January 1990 it was the centerpiece for the Gubernatorial inaugural celebration of Douglas Wilder. In 2003, it was relocated to the Ronald Reagan Presidential Library and Museum in Simi Valley, California. The future plan for this monument is for it to be placed at one of the associated government buildings in association with the 250th celebrations in 2026 and 2027. .
