= Abraham H. Cannon =

American Mormon (1859–1896)

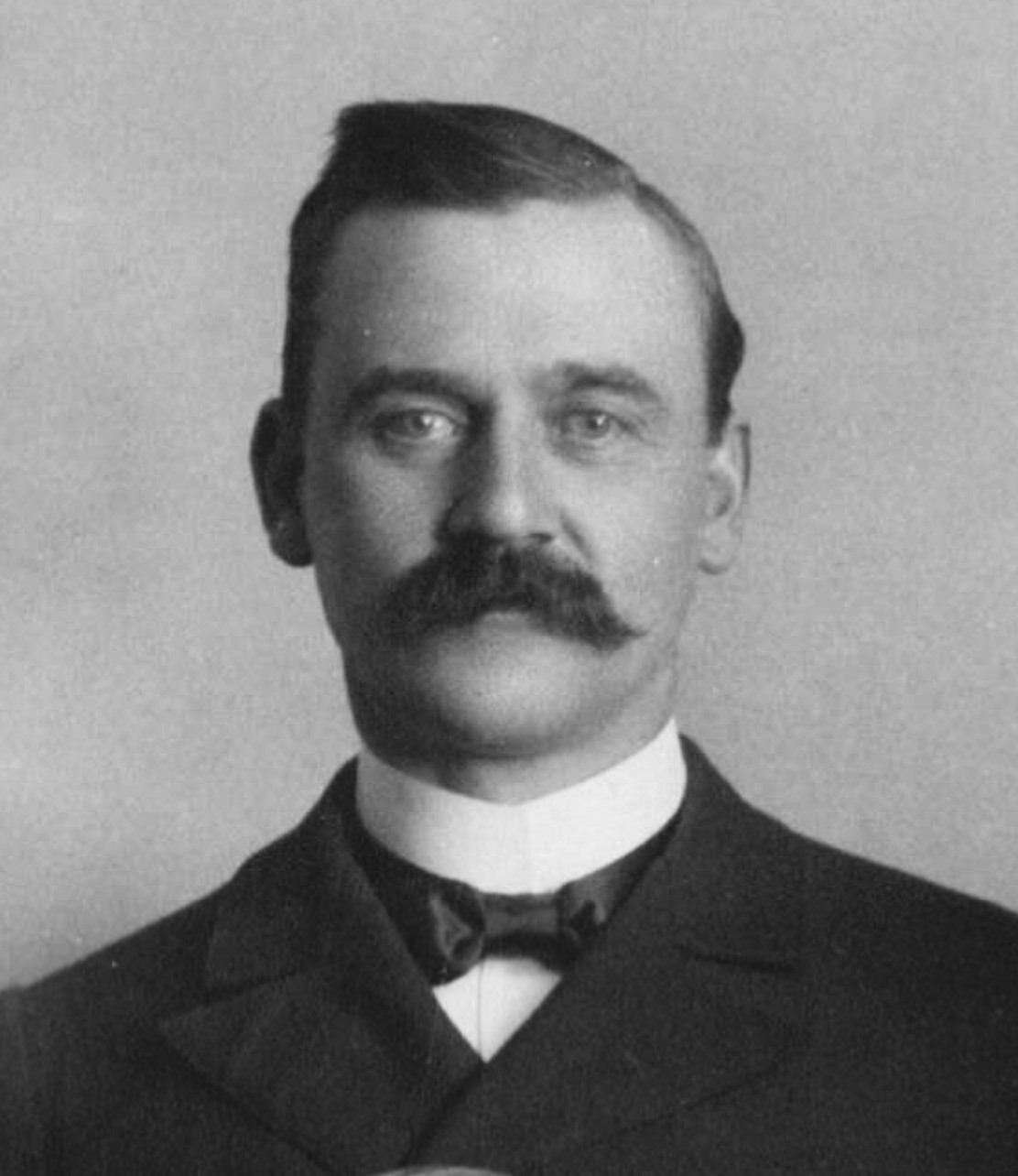

Quorum of the Twelve Apostles
- October 7, 1889 – July 19, 1896

LDS Church Apostle
- October 7, 1889 – July 19, 1896
- Reason: Excommunication of Albert Carrington; death of John Taylor and reorganization of the First Presidency; death of Erastus Snow
- Reorganization at end of term: Matthias F. Cowley and Abraham O. Woodruff ordained

First Seven Presidents of the Seventy
- October 8, 1882 – October 7, 1889
- End reason: Called to the Quorum of the Twelve Apostles

Personal details
- Born: Abraham Hoagland Cannon; March 12, 1859; Salt Lake City, Utah Territory, U.S.
- Died: July 19, 1896 (aged 37); Salt Lake City, Utah, U.S.
- Resting place: Salt Lake City Cemetery; 40°46′37.92″N 111°51′28.8″W
- Spouse(s): Sarah A. Jenkins; Wilhelmina Mousley; Mary E. C. Young; Lilian Hamlin
- Parents: George Q. Cannon; Elizabeth Hoagland

Abraham Hoagland Cannon (also reported as Abram H. Cannon) (March 12, 1859 – July 19, 1896) was a member of the Quorum of the Twelve Apostles of the Church of Jesus Christ of Latter-day Saints (LDS Church).

== Personal history ==
Cannon was born in Salt Lake City, Utah Territory. His parents were George Q. Cannon, a Latter Day Saints apostle, and Elizabeth Hoagland, daughter of Abraham Hoagland.

Cannon studied at Deseret University. Later, he studied architecture under Obed Taylor.

=== Marriages ===
Cannon married Sarah A. Jenkins on October 16, 1878. Cannon practiced plural marriage. He married his second wife, Wilhelmina Mousley, on October 15, 1879. On March 17, 1886, Cannon was convicted under the Edmunds Act of unlawful cohabitation and sentenced to six months' imprisonment and a fine of $300. Despite this conviction, Cannon married his third and fourth wives—Mary E. C. Young on January 11, 1887, and Lilian Hamlin on June 17, 1896.

Cannon was pardoned in 1894 by U.S. president Grover Cleveland.

=== Publisher ===
In 1882, at the age of 23, Cannon assumed business control of the Juvenile Instructor and associated publications. He continued his management until his death.

In October 1892, Cannon and his brother John Q. Cannon took control of the Deseret News publishing. He also became the editor and publisher of The Contributor.

=== LDS Church service ===
On October 9, 1882, Cannon became a member of the First Seven Presidents of the Seventy of the church.

On October 7, 1889, church president Wilford Woodruff named Cannon a member of the Quorum of the Twelve Apostles. He was ordained an apostle on that date by Joseph F. Smith. Cannon served in this capacity until his death.

=== Death ===
Early in the summer of 1896, Cannon visited California, where he presumably visited the ocean, swam in it, and got ocean water trapped within his ear. This led to an ear infection, and by mid-July Cannon was seriously ill. He underwent at least one surgery to relieve pressure and drain the infection, but the illness continued. Cannon died on July 19 at the age of 37 in Salt Lake City.

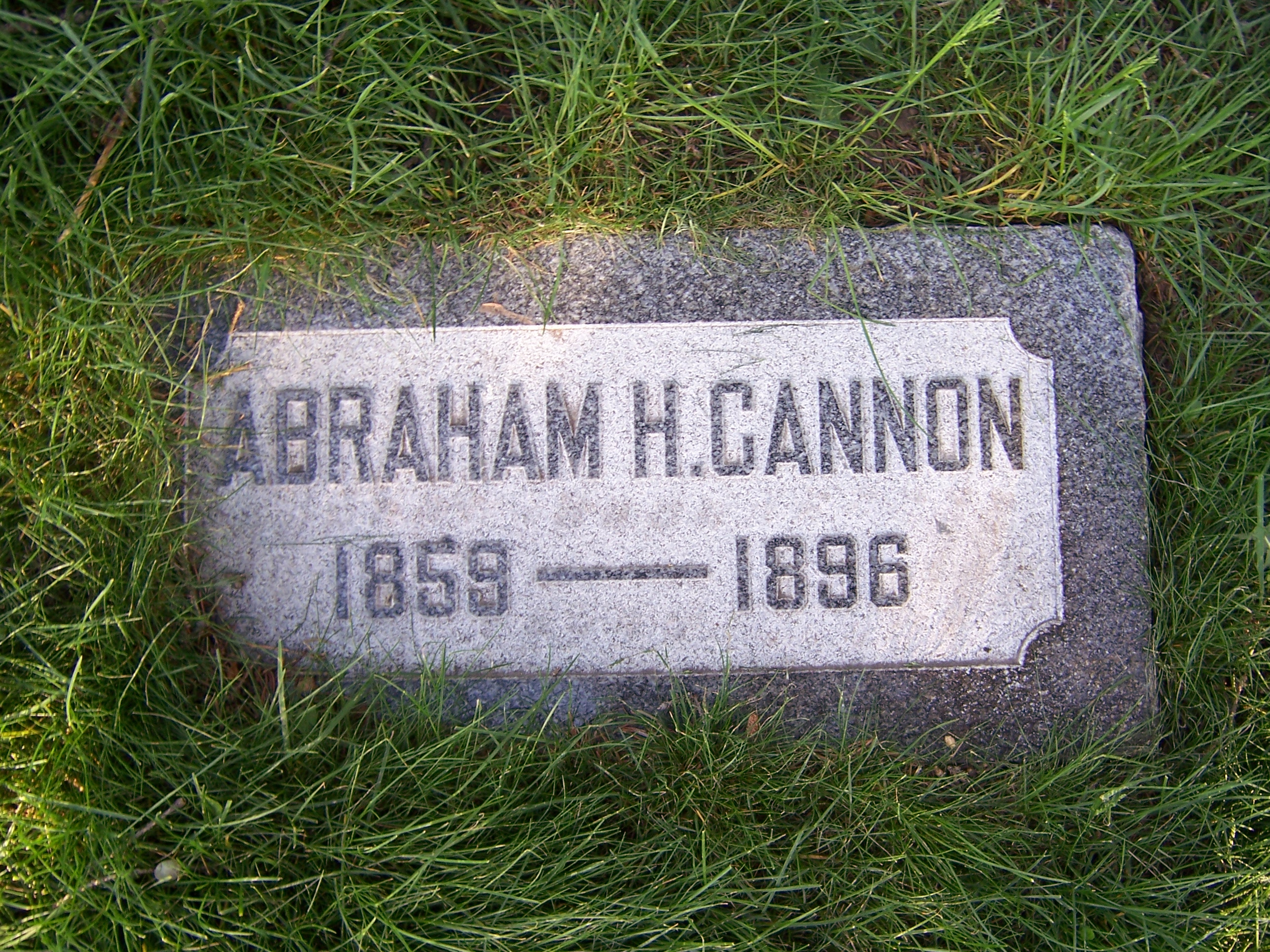
Grave marker of Abraham H. Cannon.

== Works ==
- Cannon, Abraham H. (1886). Questions and answers on the Book of Mormon: Designed and prepared especially for the use of the Sunday schools in Zion. Juvenile Instructor. B00086IO4A.
- Horne, Dennis B., ed. (2004). An Apostle's Record: The Journals of Abraham H. Cannon. Gnolaum Books. ISBN 0-9746780-0-7.
- Cannon, Abraham H. (1879–1883). Mormon Missionary Diaries of Abraham H. Cannon vol. 1-3.

The Church of Jesus Christ of Latter-day Saints titles
Preceded by Anthon H. Lund	Quorum of the Twelve Apostles; October 7, 1889 – July 19, 1896	Succeeded by Matthias F. Cowley
