= Joseph J. Cannon =

American politician

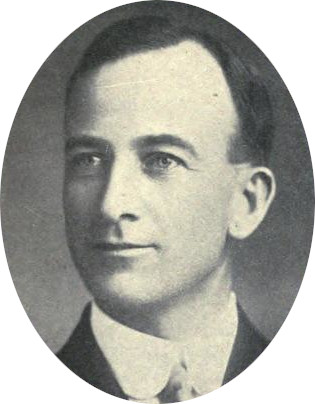

Member of the Utah House of Representatives
- In office 1909–1911

Personal details
- Born: May 22, 1877
- Died: November 5, 1945 (aged 68)

Joseph Jenne Cannon (May 22, 1877 – November 5, 1945) was a Utah politician and newspaper editor and was a leader in the Church of Jesus Christ of Latter-day Saints (LDS Church). He was a member of the prominent Cannon political family.

== Biography ==
As a young man, Cannon served as a missionary for the LDS Church in Europe. He accompanied LDS Church apostle Francis M. Lyman in offering prayers in St. Petersburg and Moscow which dedicated Russia for the preaching of Mormonism in August 1903. Lyman and Cannon also similarly dedicated Finland in 1903.

In the 1908 election, Cannon was elected as a member of the Utah House of Representatives from Salt Lake County. He served one term, from 1909 to 1911. Cannon was not formally associated with any political party.

From 1931 to 1934, Cannon was the editor of the Deseret News, a Salt Lake City newspaper owned by the LDS Church. His tenure ended when the LDS Church asked him to become the president of the church's British Mission. Cannon served in this capacity for three years, until 1937.

Immediately following his return to Utah, Cannon was asked to become the first assistant to George Q. Morris, the general superintendent of the church's Young Men's Mutual Improvement Association. Cannon served in this capacity until his death from pancreatic cancer in 1945.
