= The Young Woman's Journal =

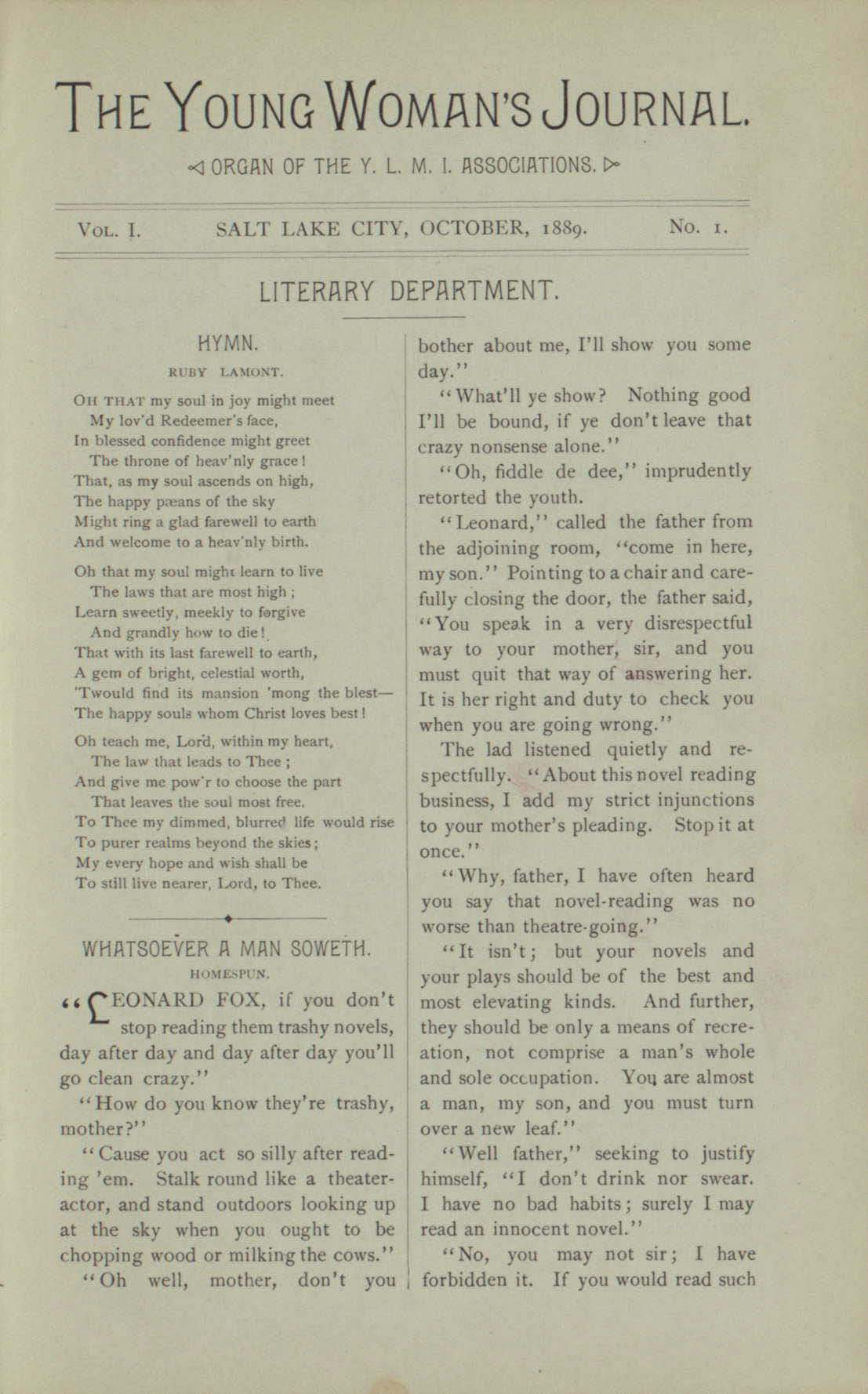
- First issue of the Young Women's Journal, October 1889.
- Frequency: Monthly magazine
- Founder: Susa Young Gates
- Founded: 1889
- First issue: October 1889
- Final issue Number: October 1929; Vol 40 No 10
- Company: The Church of Jesus Christ of Latter-day Saints
- Country: United States
- Based in: Salt Lake City
- Language: English

The Young Woman's Journal was an official publication of the Church of Jesus Christ of Latter-day Saints (LDS Church) for the Young Ladies' Mutual Improvement Association (YLMIA), then the LDS Church's organization for adolescent females.

== History and profile ==
The Young Woman's Journal was founded in 1889 by Susa Young Gates, a volunteer worker within the YLMIA, with its first issue dated October of that year. Anstis Elmina Shepard Taylor, the YLMIA general president at the time, oversaw the first publication of the journal. The periodical was unique for the time period, because of its target of a "young woman" audience.

Throughout its history, the periodical was edited by the general leadership board of the YLMIA under the direction of the organization's general presidency. It was published monthly until 1929, when the magazine was absorbed by the Improvement Era, an official publication of the YLMIA and the church's equivalent organization for male adolescents. The Improvement Era then served both organizations from that time forward.

The journal included messages from the MIA conferences, scriptural quotations, a plethora of short stories, recipes, meeting schedules, and pieces about morals, clothing, etc. Unlike current publications of the LDS Church, The Young Woman's Journal was subsidized by advertisements carried in the magazine.

== Editors ==
- Susa Young Gates (1889–1901)
- May Booth Talmage (1901–02)
- Ann M. Cannon (1902–07)
- Mary Connelly Kimball (1907–23)
- Clarissa A. Beesley (1923–29)
- Elsie Talmage Brandley (1929)

== See also ==
- New Era (magazine)
- List of Latter Day Saint periodicals
- Improvement Era

== Bibliography ==
- Kelly, Petrea (1992), "Young Woman's Journal", in Ludlow, Daniel H. (ed.), Encyclopedia of Mormonism, New York: Macmillan Publishing, pp. 1615–16, ISBN 978-0-02-879602-4, OCLC 24502140
