= Elmina Shepard Taylor =

American religious leader

Elmina S. Taylor
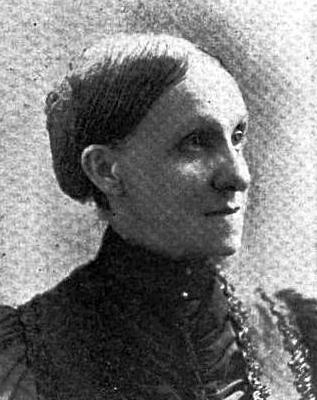

1st general president of the Young Women
- June 19, 1880 – December 6, 1904
- Called by: Brigham Young
- Successor: Martha H. Tingey

Personal details
- Born: Anstis Elmina Shepard; September 12, 1830; Middlefield, New York, United States
- Died: December 6, 1904 (aged 74); Salt Lake City, Utah, United States
- Resting place: Salt Lake City Cemetery; 40.777°N 111.858°W
- Spouse(s): George H. Taylor
- Children: 7, including: Mae T. Nystrom
- Parents: David S. Shepard; Rosella Bailey
- Website: Elmina Shepard Taylor

Anstis Elmina Shepard Taylor (September 12, 1830 – December 6, 1904) was the first general president of what is today the Young Women organization of the Church of Jesus Christ of Latter-day Saints (LDS Church) and was a founding member of the National Council of Women of the United States.

== Biography ==
Anstis E. Shepard was born in Middlefield, New York to David Spaulding Shepard and Rosella Bailey. She was the oldest of their two daughters. Her parents were devout members of the Methodist Episcopal Church. She attended the Harwick Academy, and following her graduation she left home in 1854 to teach school in Haverstraw, New York, where she met John Druce, a member of the LDS Church. She was taught by Druce and baptized into the church on July 5, 1856. On August 31, 1856, she married George Hamilton Taylor, another convert, in Haverstraw. They left New York for Utah on April 15, 1859. She met with the Edward Stevenson Company that left from Quincy, Illinois, in June 1859 and arrived in Salt Lake City on September 16.

In Utah, they started a successful lumber company. They were rebaptized and received their endowments from Brigham Young in the Endowment House. The couple had seven children, three of which died before reaching adulthood. In 1877, Taylor agreed to her husband marrying Louise (Louie) Foote; later in 1885, George took a third wife, Ella Susannah Colebrook. The following year, George was imprisoned for practicing polygamy. Taylor continued to support and defend plural marriage.

At a meeting of the LDS Church's organization for adolescent girls held June 19, 1880, in the Assembly Hall on Temple Square, Taylor was appointed the first general president of the Young Ladies' National Mutual Improvement Association, the original name of the church's Young Women organization. Taylor was the general president of the organization until her death in 1904. Taylor held the first churchwide conference for young women in 1890. As president, she attended meetings of National Council of Women of the United States and International Council of Women throughout the 1890s. She also attended The World's Congress of Representative Women in 1893. Under her direction, Susa Young Gates founded the Young Woman's Journal, which began publication in 1889 and was published until 1929. Just prior to Taylor's death, she shortened the name of the YLNMIA to the Young Ladies' Mutual Improvement Association. Taylor was succeeded by her second counselor, Martha H. Tingey.

In 1888, Taylor and others met with Susan B. Anthony in Seneca Falls, New York, and participated in the founding of the National Council of Women of the United States, an organization dedicated to promoting the rights of women. In 1891, Taylor was appointed an ex officio vice president of the organization, a position she held until her death. Taylor died at her home in Salt Lake City.

== See also ==
- Mae Taylor Nystrom, daughter
- Margaret Young Taylor, counselor

The Church of Jesus Christ of Latter-day Saints titles
First	General president of the Young Women; June 19, 1880 – December 6, 1904	Succeeded by Martha H. Tingey
