= John Taylor (Mormon) =

19th century LDS Church Leader

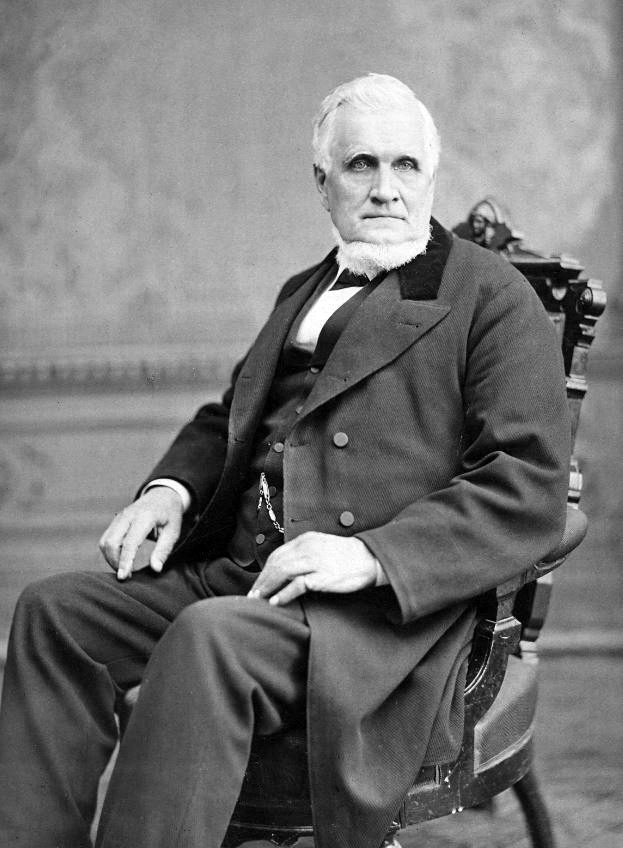

3rd President of the Church of Jesus Christ of Latter-day Saints
- 10 October 1880 – 25 July 1887
- Predecessor: Brigham Young
- Successor: Wilford Woodruff

President of the Quorum of the Twelve Apostles
- 10 April 1875 – 10 October 1880
- Predecessor: Orson Hyde
- Successor: Wilford Woodruff
- End reason: Became President of the Church

Quorum of the Twelve Apostles
- 19 December 1838 – 10 October 1880
- Called by: Joseph Smith
- End reason: Became President of the Church

LDS Church Apostle
- 19 December 1838 – 25 July 1887
- Called by: Joseph Smith
- Reason: Replenishing Quorum of the Twelve
- Reorganization at end of term: Marriner W. Merrill, Anthon H. Lund, and Abraham H. Cannon ordained

Personal details
- Born: 1 November 1808; Milnthorpe, Westmorland, England
- Died: 25 July 1887 (aged 78); Kaysville, Utah, United States
- Resting place: Salt Lake City Cemetery; 40°46′37.92″N 111°51′28.8″W
- Spouse(s): Leonora Cannon; Elizabeth Kaighin; Jane Ballantyne; Mary Ann Oakley; Sophia Whitaker; Harriet Whitaker; Margaret Young; Josephine Elizabeth Roueche
- Children: 34
- Signature

John Taylor (1 November 1808 – 25 July 1887) was an English-born American religious leader who served as the third president of the Church of Jesus Christ of Latter-day Saints (LDS Church) from 1880 to 1887. He is the first and so far only president of the LDS Church to have been born outside the United States.

== Early life ==
Taylor was born in Milnthorpe, Westmorland (now part of Cumbria), England, the son of James and Agnes Taylor. He had formal schooling up to age fourteen, and then he served an initial apprenticeship to a cooper and later received training as a woodturner and cabinetmaker. He claimed that as a young man, he had a vision of "an angel in the heavens, holding a trumpet to his mouth, sounding a message to the nations"—which he would later identify as the angel Moroni. He was christened in the Church of England, but joined the Methodist church at sixteen. He was appointed a local preacher a year later, and felt a calling to preach in North America. Taylor's parents and siblings emigrated to Upper Canada (present-day Ontario) in 1830. Taylor stayed in England to dispose of the family property and joined his family in Toronto in 1832. He met Leonora Cannon from the Isle of Man while attending a Toronto Methodist Church and, although she initially rejected his proposal, married her on 28 January 1833.

Between 1834 and 1836, John and Leonora Taylor participated in a religious study group in Toronto. The group discussed problems and concerns with their Methodist faith, and quickly became known as the "Dissenters." Other members included Joseph Fielding and his sisters Mary and Mercy, who later also became prominent in the Latter Day Saint movement. While in Toronto, Taylor continued to work in his trade as a woodturner.

== Early church service ==
Taylor and his wife first came in contact with the Church of the Latter Day Saints in 1836 after meeting Parley P. Pratt, an apostle in the church, in Toronto. Leonora was the first to join the church and she persuaded Taylor to continue his studies with Pratt. After the couple's baptism into the church, they were active in preaching and the organization of the church in Upper Canada. Taylor for a time presided over six branches in the Toronto area. In July 1837 he was closely involved in coordinating Joseph Smith's visit to the Toronto area. They then moved to Far West, Missouri, where Taylor was ordained an apostle on 19 December 1838. He assisted other church members as they fled frequent conflicts to Commerce, Illinois (soon after renamed Nauvoo).

In 1839, Taylor and some of his fellow apostles served missions in Britain. While there, Taylor preached in Liverpool and was responsible for Mormon preaching in Ireland and the Isle of Man.

== Nauvoo ==
Taylor returned to Nauvoo, Illinois, to serve as a city councilman, a chaplain, a colonel, a newspaper editor, and a judge advocate for the Nauvoo Legion. Taylor edited two newspapers in Nauvoo, Times and Seasons and the Nauvoo Neighbor. Times and Seasons was the official organ of the Latter Day Saint church; he was officially the assistant editor under Joseph Smith, but due to Smith also being president of the church, Taylor made most of the editorial decisions. Taylor also edited the more politically concerned Nauvoo Neighbor and the Wasp, the predecessor of the Nauvoo Neighbor, for about a year. Taylor was thus the editor of Nauvoo's two main papers from 1842 to 1846.

In 1842, Taylor was present at the organization of the Relief Society. He set apart Sarah Cleveland and Elizabeth Ann Whitney as counselors to Emma Smith.

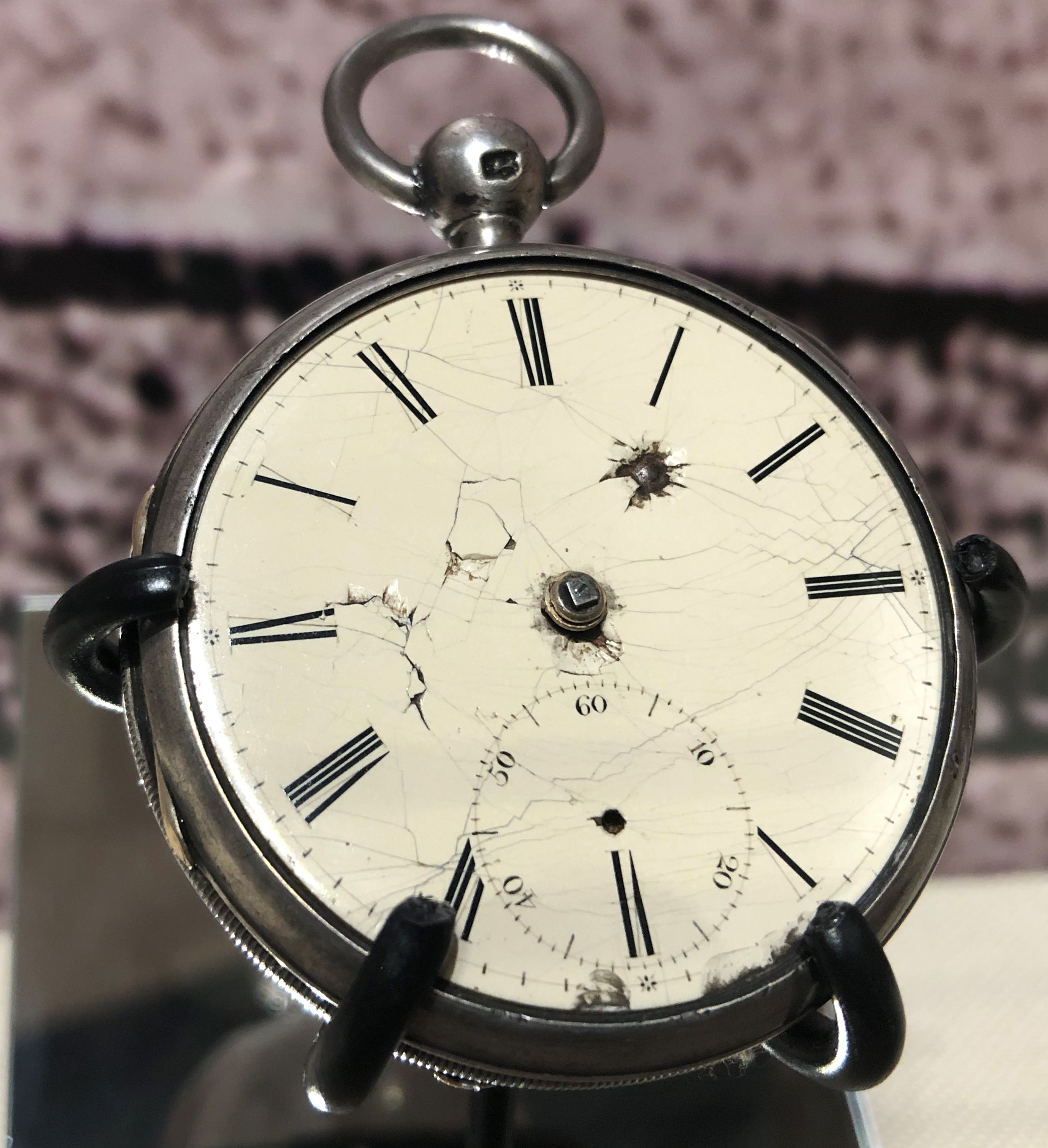
Pocket Watch worn by John Taylor during the martyrdom of Joseph and Hyrum Smith.

In 1844, Taylor was with church founder Joseph Smith, his brother Hyrum Smith, and fellow apostle Willard Richards in the Carthage, Illinois, jail when the Smiths were killed by a mob. Taylor was severely wounded in the conflict. His life may have been spared when a musket ball directed towards his chest was stopped by a pocket watch which he was carrying at the time. However, recent analysis shows the watch may instead have been damaged when Taylor fell against the windowsill.

In 1845, Taylor became the president of the Nauvoo Tradesmen Association. This group worked to encourage local manufacturing of goods for both local use and export. Taylor had two assistants who aided him in running this group, Orson Spencer and Phineas Richards.

== Migration to the Salt Lake Valley ==
In 1846–1847, most Latter-day Saints followed Brigham Young into Iowa then the Salt Lake Valley, while Taylor went to England to resolve problems in church leadership there. On his return, he and Pratt led more Latter-day Saints, a group of about 1500, to the Salt Lake Valley, where Young and the others had settled and established Great Salt Lake City.

== Government positions ==
Taylor applied for and was granted United States citizenship in 1849. That same year he was appointed an associate judge in the provisional State of Deseret. He later served in the Utah territorial legislature from 1853 to 1876. Taylor was elected Speaker of the House for five consecutive sessions, beginning in 1857. In 1852, he wrote a small book, The Government of God, in which he compared and contrasted the secular and ecclesiastical political systems.

From 1868 to 1870 Taylor served as a probate judge of Utah County, Utah. He also served as superintendent of schools for Utah Territory beginning in 1876.

== Mission president ==
Taylor served as president of two missions of the LDS Church. In 1849, he traveled east on his way to begin missionary work in France, stopping at various waypoints in the homes of Mormon pioneers still making their way to the Salt Lake Valley. Taylor was the first church mission president in France. While in France, Taylor published a monthly newspaper called L'Etoile du Deseret with the help of Louis A. Bertrand. He also supervised missionary work in Germany, but did not himself go to any of the countries that would later form Germany.

In 1852, the Book of Mormon was published in French, with Taylor and Curtis E. Bolton credited as translators. Taylor supervised the translation, which was carried out by Bolton, Bertrand, Lazare Auge, and a "Mr. Wilhelm".

Taylor later served as president of the Eastern States Mission, based in New York City. In this capacity he published a newspaper that presented the position of the Latter-day Saints.

== Utah economic development ==
While serving as mission president in France, Taylor was directed by church president Brigham Young to prepare to establish a sugar industry in Utah Territory. This was done under the auspices of the Deseret Manufacturing Company. Taylor purchased sugar-making equipment in Liverpool while returning to the United States. These early attempts to produce sugar in Utah proved unsuccessful.

== Musical ability ==
Taylor is reported to have had a marvelous singing voice. At the request of Hyrum Smith, he twice sang the song "A Poor Wayfaring Man of Grief" in Carthage Jail just before the Smith brothers' murders.

Taylor wrote the lyrics to several hymns, some of which are still used by the LDS Church. In 2005, Taylor's hymn "Joseph the Seer" was sung at the LDS Church's celebration of the 200th anniversary of Joseph Smith's birth. The 1985 English-language edition of the LDS Church hymnal includes two hymns with lyrics by Taylor, "Go Ye Messengers of Glory" (no. 262) and "Go, Ye Messengers of Heaven" (no. 327).

== Church president ==
Following Brigham Young's death in 1877, the Quorum of the Twelve Apostles governed the church, with John Taylor as the quorum's president. Taylor became the third president of the church in 1880. He chose as his counselors Joseph F. Smith and George Q. Cannon, the latter being the nephew of his wife, Leonora.

As church president, Taylor oversaw the expansion of the Salt Lake community; the further organization of the church hierarchy; the establishment of Mormon colonies in Wyoming, Colorado, and Arizona as well as in Canada's Northwest Territories (now in Alberta) and the Mexican state of Chihuahua; and the defense of plural marriage against increasing government opposition.

While he was church president, Taylor also established Zion's Central Board of Trade to coordinate local trade and production, which was done largely through the local stakes, on a wider basis.

In 1878, the Primary Association was founded by Aurelia Spencer Rogers in Farmington, Utah Territory. For a time, the organization was placed under the direction of Relief Society General President Eliza R. Snow. In 1880, Taylor organized the churchwide adoption of the Primary Association and selected Louie B. Felt as its first general president. In October 1880, the Pearl of Great Price was canonized by the church.

Taylor also oversaw the issuance of a new edition of the Doctrine and Covenants. During his term as church president, the seventies quorums were also more fully and regularly organized.

In 1882, the United States Congress enacted the Edmunds Act, which declared polygamy to be a felony. Hundreds of Mormon men and women were arrested and imprisoned for continuing to practice plural marriage. Taylor had followed Brigham Young's teachings on polygamy and had at least seven wives. He is known to have fathered 34 children.

Taylor moved into the Gardo House alone with his sister, Agnes, to avoid prosecution and to avoid showing preference to any one of his families. However, by 1885, he and his counselors were forced to withdraw from public view to live in the "underground" and were frequently on the move to avoid arrest. In 1885, during his last public sermon, Taylor remarked, "I would like to obey and place myself in subjection to every law of man. What then? Am I to disobey the law of God? Has any man a right to control my conscience, or your conscience?... No man has a right to do it."

Many viewed Mormon polygamy as religiously, socially, and politically threatening. In 1887, the US Congress passed the Edmunds–Tucker Act, which abolished women's suffrage in Utah Territory, forced wives to testify against their husbands, disincorporated the LDS Church, dismantled the Perpetual Emigrating Fund Company, abolished the Nauvoo Legion, and provided that LDS Church property in excess of $50,000 would be forfeited to the United States.

For two-and-a-half years, Taylor presided over the church from exile. During this period, some Mormon fundamentalist groups claim that he received the 1886 Revelation. Photographs of the original document exist. It restated the permanence of the "New and Everlasting Covenant", which these fundamentalist groups consider to be a direct reference to the practice of plural marriage. The validity of the revelation is rejected by the LDS Church, which does not consider it to be binding, but it is used by fundamentalist groups as justification for their continued practice of polygamy.

== Death ==
Taylor died on 25 July 1887, from congestive heart failure in Kaysville, Utah Territory. Taylor was buried at the Salt Lake City Cemetery in The Avenues, Salt Lake City, Utah. For two years after his death, the church again was without a presidency. The Quorum of the Twelve Apostles, with Wilford Woodruff as president of the quorum, assumed leadership during this interim period. In the April 1889 church general conference, the First Presidency was reorganized with Wilford Woodruff as the president. Six months later, in the October general conference, Anthon H. Lund was called to fill Taylor's vacancy in the Quorum of the Twelve Apostles.

Taylor's teachings as an apostle were the 2003 course of study in the LDS Church's Sunday Relief Society and Melchizedek priesthood classes.

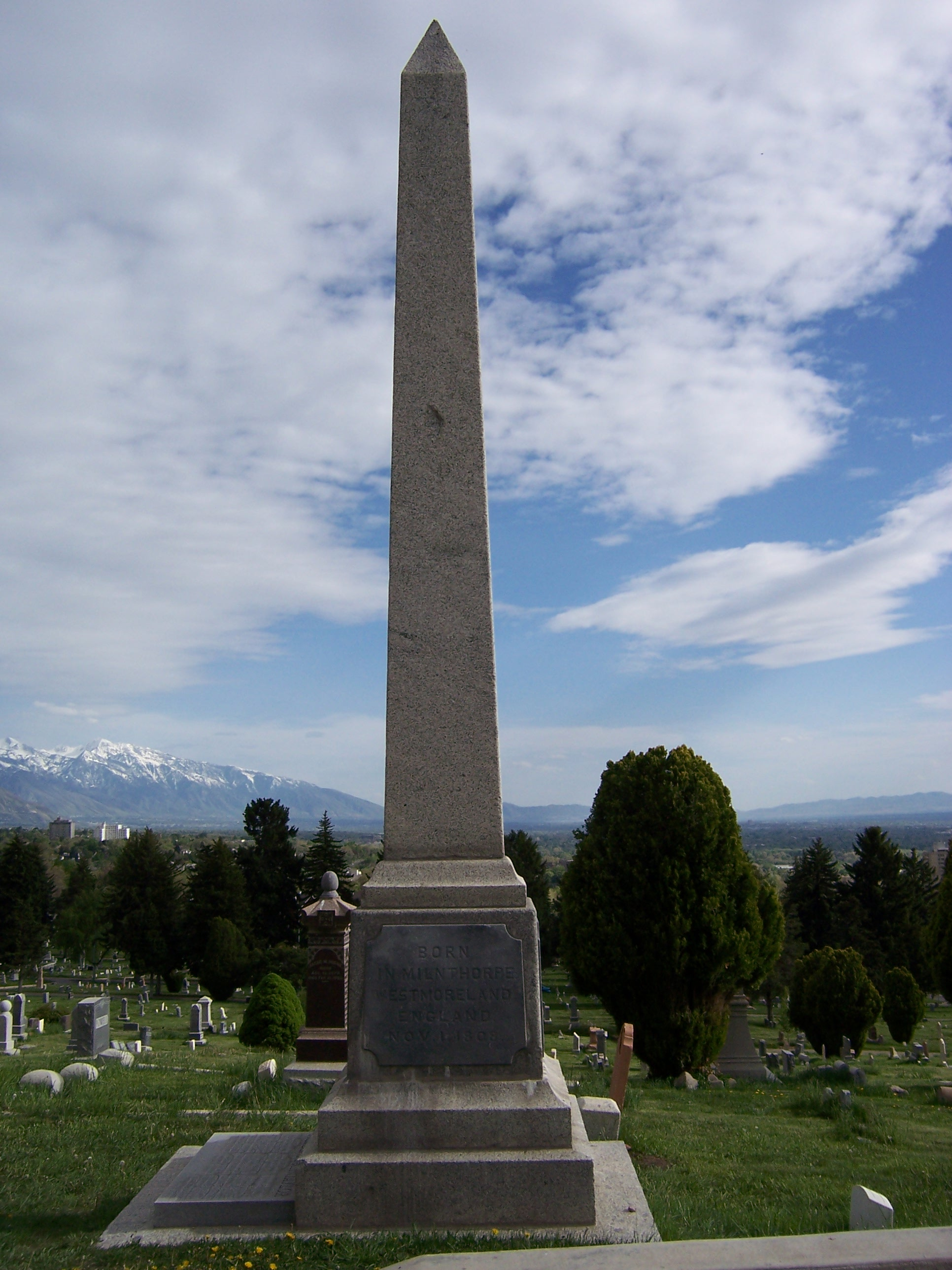
North view of John Taylor's Grave monument.

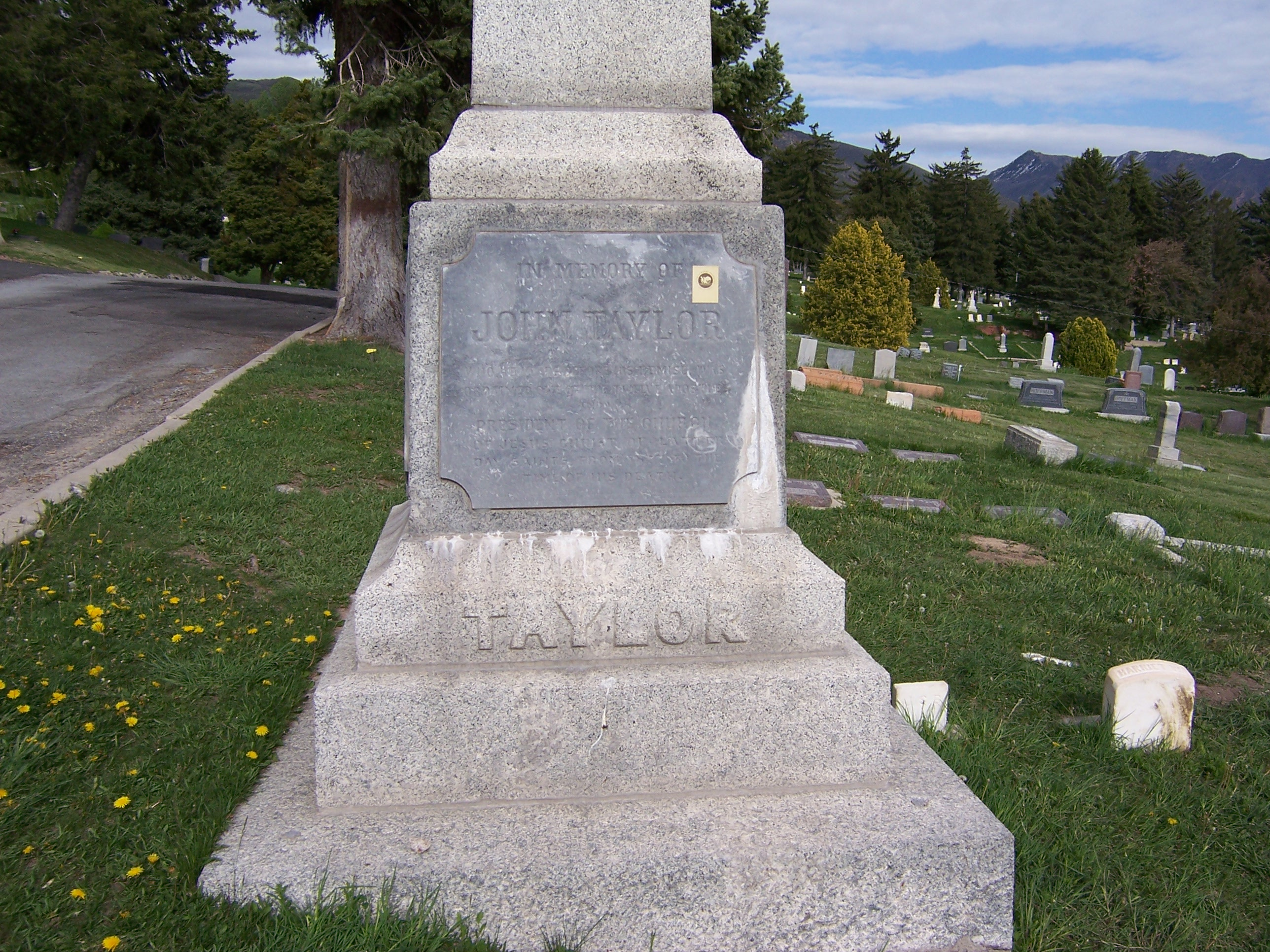
Lower portion of west side of monument.

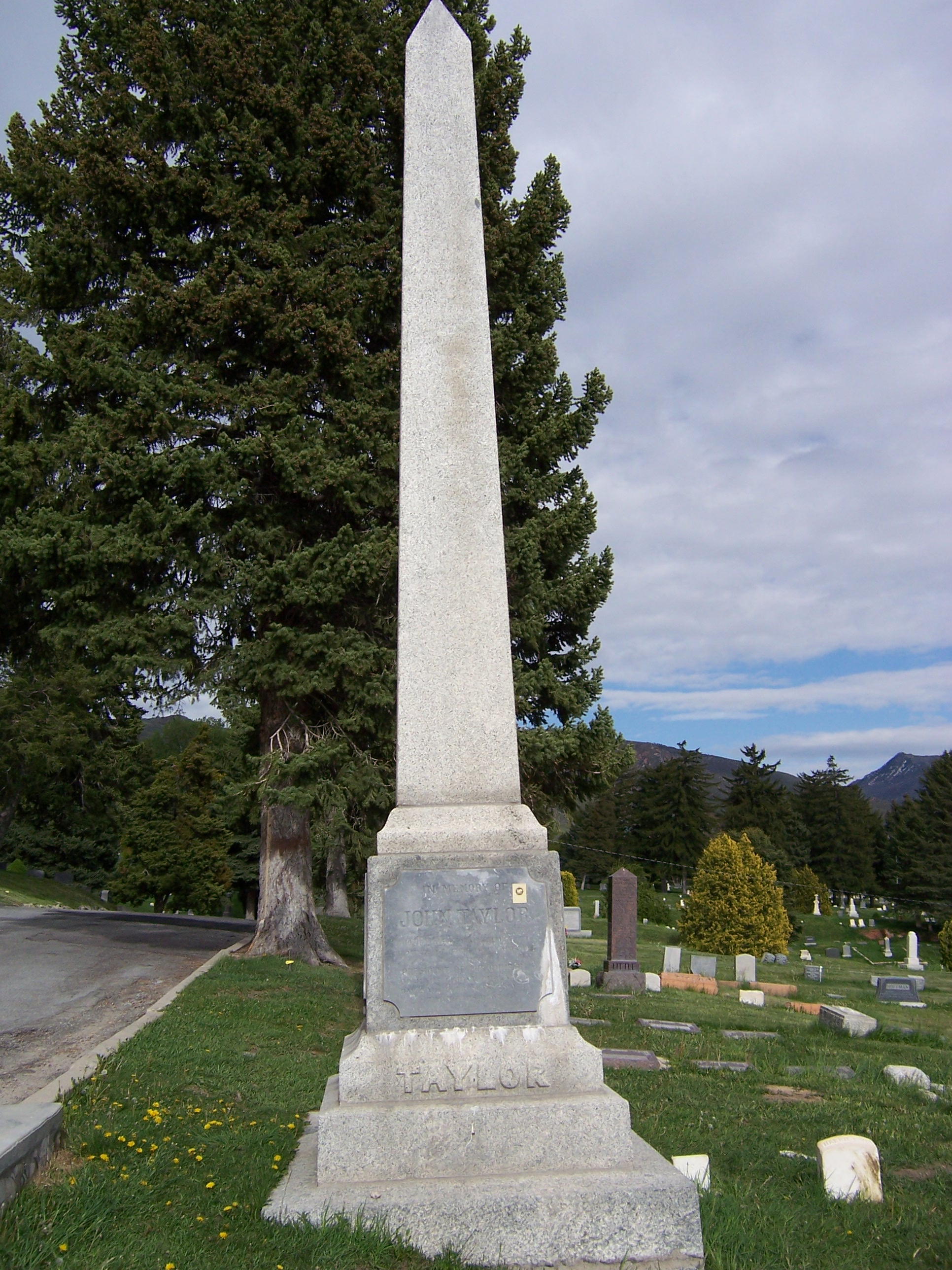
West view of monument

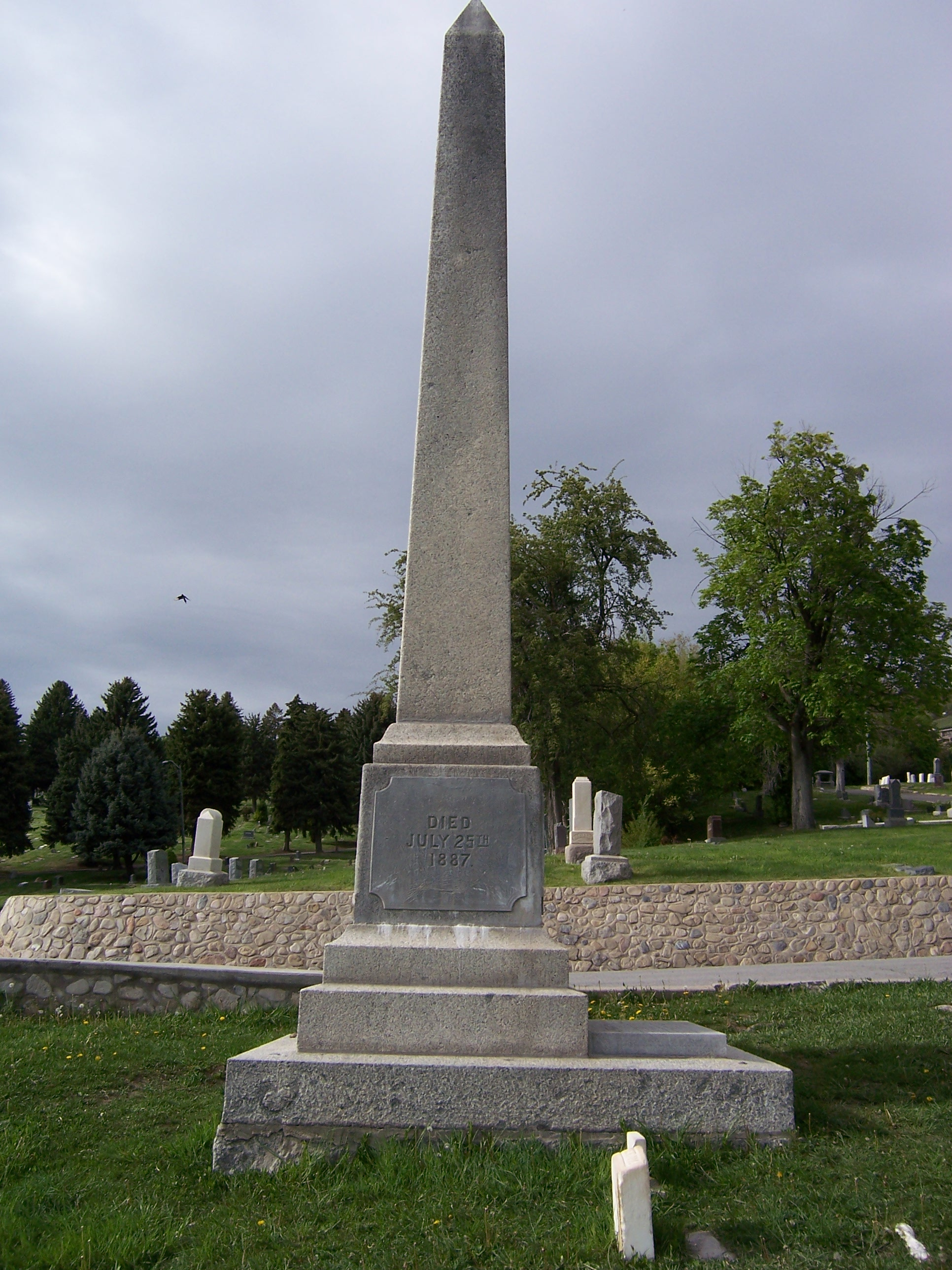
South view of monument.

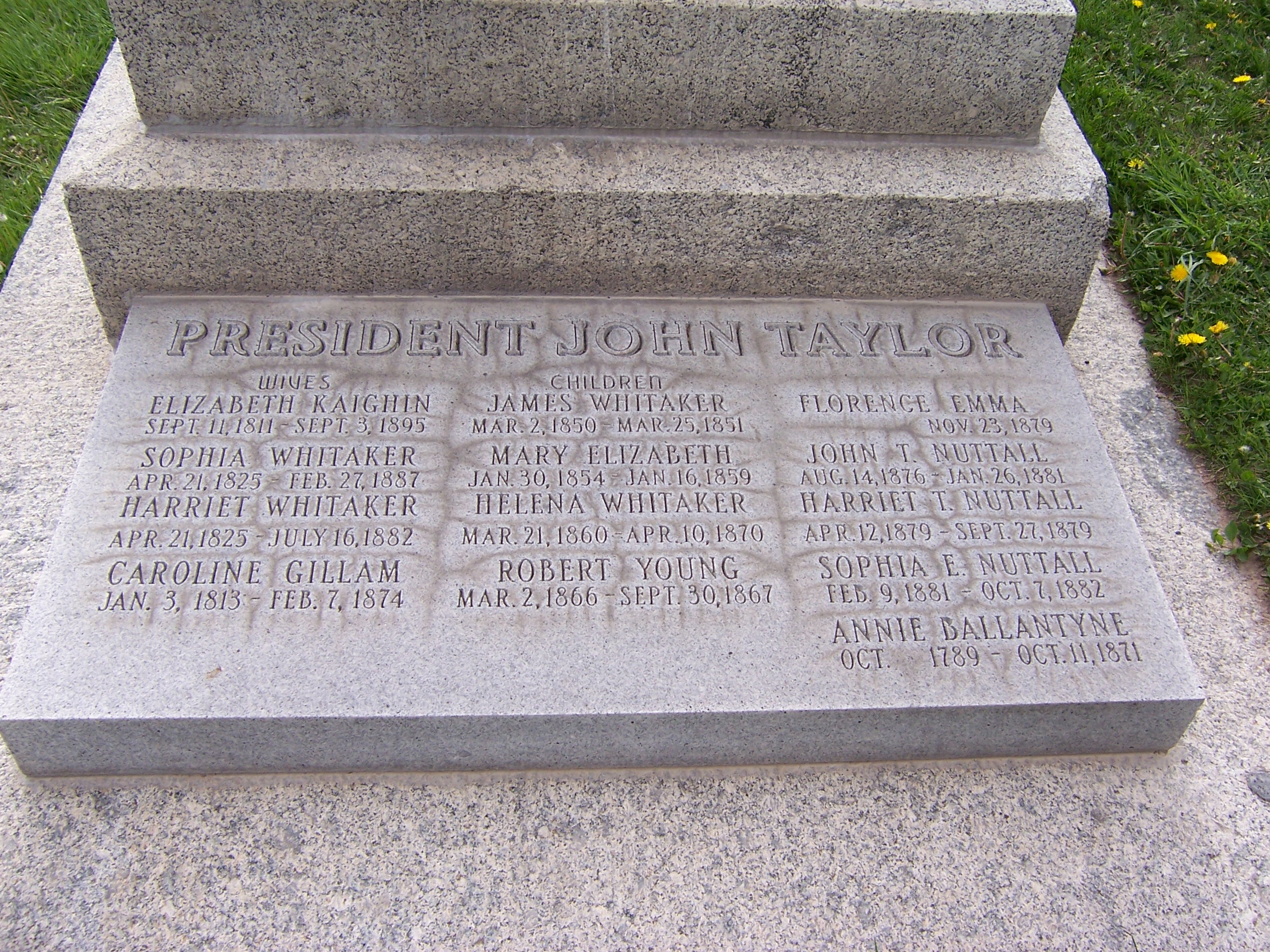
East view of bottom portion of monument.

== Family ==
Taylor practiced plural marriage and was married to eight wives: Leonora Cannon, Elizabeth Kaighin, Jane Ballantyne, Mary Ann Oakley, Sophia Whitaker, Harriet Whitaker, Margaret Young, and Josephine Elizabeth Roueche. He was the father of 34 children.

Taylor's son, John W. Taylor, continued to serve in the church and in politics and helped to shepherd Utah to statehood in 1896. John W. Taylor was ultimately excommunicated from the LDS Church for his opposition to the church's abandonment of plural marriage. His son, Samuel W. Taylor, became a writer, and the biographer of his father and grandfather.

Another son, William W. Taylor, served as one of the first presidents of the seventy and also served in the Utah territorial legislature.

Taylor's wife Margaret Young Taylor was a member of the inaugural general presidency of what is today the church's Young Women organization. Taylor's daughter Annie Taylor Hyde was a leader in the Relief Society general presidency and was the founder of Daughters of Utah Pioneers.

=== Wives ===
Wife	Born	Died
Leonora Cannon	6 October 1796	9 December 1868 (aged 72)
Elizabeth Kaighin	11 September 1811	30 September 1895 (aged 84)
Jane Ballantyne	11 April 1813	26 December 1901 (aged 88)
Mary Ann Oakley	20 March 1826	30 August 1911 (aged 85)
Sophia Whitaker	21 April 1825	28 February 1887 (aged 61)
Harriet Whitaker	21 April 1825	16 July 1882 (aged 57)
Margaret Young	24 April 1837	3 May 1919 (aged 82)
Josephine Elizabeth Roueche	3 March 1860	27 November 1943 (aged 83)

== Works ==
- Taylor, John (1852). The Government of God. S. W. Richards.
- — (1882). An Examination into and an Elucidation of the Great Principle of the Mediation and Atonement of Our Lord and Savior Jesus Christ. Deseret News.
- — (1943). The Gospel Kingdom: Selections from the Writings and Discourses of John Taylor. compiled by G. Homer Durham. Bookcraft, Inc.
- — (1984). Samuel W. Taylor and Raymond W. Taylor. (ed.). The John Taylor Papers: Records of the Last Utah Pioneer, Vol I, 1836–1877, the Apostle. Taylor Trust.
- — (1985). Samuel W. Taylor and Raymond W. Taylor. (ed.). The John Taylor Papers: Records of the Last Utah Pioneer, Vol II, 1877–1887, the President. Taylor Trust.
- — (1996). Dean C. Jessee. (ed.). John Taylor Nauvoo Journal. Grandin Book.
- — (2001). Teachings of Presidents of the Church: John Taylor. The Church of Jesus Christ of Latter-day Saints. LDS Church publication number 35969.

== See also ==
- Cannon family

== Sources ==
- Allen, James B.; Glen M. Leonard. The Story of the Latter-day Saints. Deseret Book Co., Salt Lake City, UT, 1976. ISBN 978-0-87747-594-1.
- Krakauer, Jon. Under the Banner of Heaven: A Story of Violent Faith (Doubleday, New York, 2003). ISBN 978-1-4000-3280-8. The book takes its title from part of a speech given by Taylor on 4 January 1880 in defense of the Mormon practice of polygamy: "We believe in honesty, morality, and purity; but when they enact tyrannical laws, forbidding us the free exercise of our religion, we cannot submit. God is greater than the United States, and when the Government conflicts with heaven, we will be ranged under the banner of heaven and against the Government."
- Smith, Paul Thomas (1992), "Taylor, John", in Ludlow, Daniel H (ed.), Encyclopedia of Mormonism, New York: Macmillan Publishing, pp. 1438–1441, ISBN 0-02-879602-0, OCLC 24502140
- Nibley, Preson. The Presidents of the Church. Deseret Book Company, Salt Lake City, UT, 1974. ISBN 978-0-87747-414-2.
- Taylor, Mark H. Editor. Witness to the Martyrdom Deseret Book Company, Salt Lake City, UT, 1999. ISBN 978-1-57345-449-0.

The Church of Jesus Christ of Latter-day Saints titles
Preceded by Brigham Young	President of the Church; 10 October 1880–25 July 1887	Succeeded by Wilford Woodruff
Preceded by Orson Hyde	President of the Quorum of the Twelve Apostles; June 1875–10 October 1880	Succeeded by Wilford Woodruff
Preceded by John E. Page	Quorum of the Twelve Apostles; 19 December 1838–10 October 1880	Succeeded by Wilford Woodruff
