= List of VDSL and VDSL2 deployments =

This is a list of very-high-bit-rate digital subscriber line (VDSL) and very-high-bit-rate digital subscriber line 2 (VDSL2) deployments.

The term VDSL can either refer specifically to ITU-T G.993.1 (first generation VDSL, officially abbreviated as "VDSL", unofficially also called "VDSL1"), or may be used as an umbrella term for both ITU-T G.993.1 and ITU-T G.993.2 (second generation VDSL, officially abbreviated "VDSL2").

== Africa ==
Mauritius (VDSL)	VDSL is being rolled out mostly in the Hotel Industry in Mauritius by a private Network Solution Integrator company, Enterprise Data Services Ltd (EDS LTD). EDS is not an ISP, but provide the VDSL in hotels as opposed to the expensive cost of fiber optic. The service enables the hotels to provide both wired and wireless Broadband Internet access, video on-demand and music on-demand as well as IP telephony to the residents. Since November 2004, till date, EDS has already completed such installation in 12 hotels.
South Africa (VDSL2)	Telkom SA began trials and deployment of VDSL2 enabled MSAN exchanges in 2012, with product offerings of 20/2 Mbit/s and 40/3 Mbit/s. It is planned that there should be a full replacement of all current DSLAM's with the new MSAN cabinet units, enabling a shorter local loop. As of June 2014, Telkom SA had deployed VDSL2 services to 180 neighbourhoods across the country with plans for another 75.
Tunisia (VDSL2)	All ISPs in Tunisia offer VDSL offers with up to 100 Mbit/s download and 20 Mbit/s upload speeds.
Egypt (VDSL2)	In April 2018, Telecom Egypt (Re-branded as WE) launched commercial VDSL2 plans known as WE Internet with speeds of (Down/Up) 100Mbit/s/10Mbit/s, 50Mbit/s/5 Mbit/s, 25 Mbit/s/2.5 Mbit/s then in mid-2019 WE launched "WE Space" with speeds of (Down/Up) 100 Mbit/s/10 Mbit/s, 70 Mbit/s/7 Mbit/s, 30 Mbit/s/3 Mbit/s.; In early 2019, Orange launched their premium "Home Internet VDSL" service with speeds ranging from 30 Mbit/s to 100 Mbit/s.

== Asia ==
Bahrain (VDSL2)	Lightspeed Communication announced that they would begin deploying VDSL2 technology for residential and business customers in 2012. Downstream speed was stated to be up to 80 Mbit/s. The service was yet to launch as of July 2013.
Hong Kong (VDSL)	VDSL is offered by HGC and PCCW. A 10 Mbit/s up and up to 30 Mbit/s down connection costs less than US$11–34 per month with an 18-month to 24-month contract (price is negotiable and each customer get different prices and plans), with unlimited traffic.
Hong Kong (VDSL2)	PCCW Limited (Netvigator) and Hutchison Global Communications (HGC) have deployed VDSL2 technology to serve residential and business customers since 2008. Netvigator provides up to 100 Mbit/s downstream and 30 Mbit/s upstream broadband service in VDSL2, while HGC asserts that to provide up to 100 Mbit/s downstream and 100 Mbit/s upstream service. However, due to equipment technical difficulties, HGC connection is pretty unstable. HGC is able to provide both 50 Mbit/s downstream and upstream in most districts of the coverage.
India (VDSL)	VDSL plan launched by MTNL (ISP for Delhi NCR and Mumbai for Mumbai city on 25 December 2009. The plan costs US$110 and has a limit of 20 GB for data transfer amount and 20 Mbit/s for data transfer speed. After crossing the limit the user has to pay approximately $10 per GB downloaded. Bharti Airtel has introduced a new VDSL plan on 28 March 2010 with speeds of 50 Mbit/s and 100 GB of data transfer.The plan cost $300. Currently Bharti Airtel offers VDSL plans starting at $30(24 Mbit/s/30 GB) and going to $60(40 Mbit/s/90 GB) While Bharat Sanchar Nigam Limited (BSNL) has also launched 3 VDSL plans 10 Mbit/s, 16 Mbit/s and 24 Mbit/s which costs approximately $75, $100 and approximately $140, respectively.
India (VDSL2)	MTNL has deployed VDSL technology in Mumbai and offers up to 20 Mbit/s downstream.; Airtel has announced 40 Mbit/s & 100 Mbit/s Plans using VDSL2 under the Airtel V-Fiber Program
Israel (VDSL)	On August 28, 2009 Bezeq communication company started testing VDSL with 20, 25, 30 and 40 Mbit/s (asymmetric, up speed 1 Mbit/s) in certain areas in north Israel.; VDSL services are provided since late 2009 using the Next generation network (NGN) of Bezeq communication company. As of 26/02/2012 NGN is still not available in all areas of the country. The maximum download speed is up to 100 Mbit/s.
Israel (VDSL2)	Bezeq has deployed FTTx with VDSL2 with brand name NGN in September 2009 offering speeds of 20 and 30 Mbit/s downstream and 1 Mbit/s upstream. In October 2010 Bezeq has deployed 50 and 60-100 Mbit/s downstream speeds and limited upstream speeds of up to 1 Mbit/s.In April 2012 Bezeq has limited upstream speeds to 1.5 Mbit/s. In the beginning of 2013 Bezeq will deploy 200 Mbit/s downstream speed using two copper pairs bonding. As of November 2020 Bezeq offers 40/3 Mbit/s downstream/upstream, 100/5 Mbit/s downstream/upstream and 200/5 Mbit/s downstream/upstream options in most of the country. As of 2016 Bezeq is also providing VDSL2-Vectoring infrastructure.
Japan (VDSL)	VDSL is offered by NTT under the product name, B-Flets. TEPCO, KDDI, and SoftBank also offer competing VDSL services.; Japan's VDSL offerings use an FTTB access line network architecture. Use of VDSL is limited for providing last mile connections for an older multi-dwelling units.
Macau (VDSL2)	CTM started to test VDSL2 in the 3rd quarter of 2007.
Malaysia (VDSL/VDSL2)	Alcatel Lucent is also a provider of VDSL in Malaysia.; Telekom Malaysia is deploying VDSL/VDSL2 with its Unifi service in high-rise and residential apartment buildings.; VDSL Network S.B. has also been a provider of VDSL technology for more than 3 years in Malaysia.; Telekom Malaysia deployed (FTTx-Residential) and (VDSL2-High Rise) with brand name Unifi in March 2010 offering symmetrical speeds of 5, 10 and 20 Mbit/s & asymmetrical speed of 30, 50 and 100 Mbit/s.
Pakistan (VDSL2)	VDSL2 is offered by PTCL to provide data rates of up to 100 Mbit/s.
Philippines (VDSL2)	VDSL2 is being rolled out by PLDT along with its Fiber-optic lines, both branded as Fibr. It will provide fiber-like data rates, but for subscribers that exclusively have older POTS/Copper facilities. VDSL is offered on 20 Mbit/s, 50 Mbit/s, and 100 Mbit/s packages under PLDT Fibr brand; VDSL2 is one of the technology offered for Globe Telecom's Globe at Home Broadband aside from ADSL2+ and Fiber-optic lines. VDSL lines are offered on 50 Mbit/s and 100 Mbit/s packages.
Saudi Arabia (VDSL2)	Saudi Telecom Company (STC) launched VDSL2 service in December 2011 offering various speed packages including 40 Mbit/s Downstream and 10 Mbit/s Upstream to provide Triple-play services including High-Speed Internet (HSI), IPTV (SD and HD) and VoIP from single VDSL CPE with built-in Wi-Fi. This complements STC's existing ADSL2+ installed base which already offers download speed of up to 20 Mbit/s as part of Fixed Broadband Access (FTTx) Network. In 2018 the company launched a new package (Unlimited Internet + Jawwy TV) which offers IPTV and VoIP with speeds up to 100 Mbit/s for Huawei cabinets and up to 45 Mbit/s for Alcatel Lucent cabinets.
Singapore (VDSL2)	SingTel tied up with Ericsson to deploy a technical trial of VDSL2 starting June 2006. However, no service plans announced yet and SingTel is preferring FTTH over VDSL2.
South Korea (VDSL)	KT and other several providers offer VDSL in the place where FTTH is not available. The speed is varied from 4 Mbit/s to 100 Mbit/s by payment plans, about US$25–40 per month.
Sri Lanka (VDSL2)	Sri Lanka Telecom announced the soft launch of its VDSL2 advanced fixed broadband technology in May 2013 and is planning to expand the service in the near future.
Taiwan (VDSL)	The VDSL modem is, and never marketed as such, a final link between the telephone line and their building's fiber terminal. As of 2013, FTTB service bandwidth is 100 Mbit/s for both download and upload, and is a major improvement over ADSL in terms of attaining maximum contract bandwidth.
Taiwan (VDSL2)	October 2007, Chunghwa Telecom (CHT) has awarded ZyXEL Communications to provide VDSL2 equipment (DSLAM and CPE) for its "Next Generation Access Network" project. The project involved 340,000 lines and would provide high speed Triple play services to these subscribers.
Thailand (VDSL)	True Corp announced on 30 June 2010 that it would offer "Ultra hi-speed Internet", a VDSL2 services, for high-end condominiums. It's said to be Thailand's first ISP to provide a VDSL2 services. True Corp will offers two packages a 50 Mbit/s downstream and 3 Mbit/s upstream or 30 Mbit/s downstream and 2 Mbit/s. There are no specific date about when it will be available, it said that soon, within 2010.
Thailand (VDSL2)	July 2010, True Online by True Corporation has released the Ultra Hi-Speed Internet . The first VDSL2 commercial services with the services is up to 50 Mbit/s downstream and up to 20 Mbit/s upstream.; 3BB by Triple T has deployed VDSL2 Internet Solutions, offering VDSL2 Internet services is up to 50 Mbit/s downstream and up to 20 Mbit/s upstream.

== Central America and the Caribbean ==
Dominican Republic (VDSL2)	Claro offers speeds ranging from 1 Mbit/s down and 256 kbit/s up to 50 Mbit/s down and 2 Mbit/s up. The upgrade to VDSL2 was required to provide enough bandwidth for the company's IPTV, data, and voice services all running on their POTS network.
Jamaica (VDSL2)	FLOW was to begin offering speeds of up to 50 Mbit/s over their existing islandwide copper network in August 2016. They company has (to date) deployed 142 MSANs islandwide. The rationale for the upgrade was to ensure parity between speeds offered on their HFC network & Copper network. In addition, it would also allow for further TV penetration using IPTV (to serve areas not reached by their HFC network) as well as offer speeds over 2.5 times faster than their current highest end package ADSL package (i.e. 20 Mbit/s down & 1 Mbit/s up).

== Europe ==
Albania (VDSL)	ALBtelecom Albania started offering VDSL2 service in March 2014. Currently offering speeds of up to 100/10 Mbit/s.
Austria (VDSL)	Telekom Austria started providing VDSL2 under the name Gigaspeed in rural areas in November 2009. As of November 2010 Telekom Austria started a widespread campaign to bring VDSL2 (GigaSpeed) to as many customers as possible in metropolitan areas.
Austria (VDSL2)	Telekom Austria started providing VDSL2 under the name Gigaspeed (now 'Glasfaser Speed') in rural areas in November 2009.
Belgium (VDSL)	Belgacom was one of the early adopters of VDSL1, which has since been surpassed for the more widely used VDSL2, supplying up to 100/40 Mbit/s (DS/US) of videograde quality to support its single-, dual- and mostly triple-play customers all over Belgium. The technology deployment accompanied a large-scale FTTC investment.
Belgium (VDSL2)	Belgacom (now Proximus) has rolled out Alcatel-Lucent VDSL2 equipment in more than 28,000 street cabinets (Q2-2019) with more than 1,500,000 VDSL2 customers (Q3-2019). Belgacom also provides VDSL2 to small enterprises. Line speeds go up to 100 Mbit/s downstream (with vectoring) and 40 Mbit/s upstream. Digital TV service Belgacom TV is delivered over this VDSL2 platform.; Some internet providers are re-selling Belgacom VDSL2 subscriptions.; EDPnet is offering VDSL2 since November 2009. The maximum speed is 100 Mbit/s and unlimited traffic.; All Belgian Scarlet ADSL customers are being moved to the Belgacom VDSL2-based network due to the sale of the Scarlet network to SNCB/NMBS-subsidiary Syntigo.
Croatia (VDSL)	VDSL2 is offered since June 2013 only by a smaller telecom H1 Telekom in urban areas. Speeds go from 20/2 to 50/15 Mbit/s. It's also available in triple play packages that include TV and telephone. However, internet-only packages are not available: customers have to get it with phone service.
Croatia (VDSL2)	H1 telekom is providing VDSL2 to customers since August 1, 2013 and it offers speeds up to 50/15 Mbit/s flat rate
Czech Republic (VDSL2)	Telefónica Czech Republic started public testing of VDSL2 service in mid-2009. VDSL2 was launched in May 2011, with availability in about half of the households. Offered speeds included 2/0.2 Mbit/s, 16/1 Mbit/s and 25/2 Mbit/s. In 2012, the speed was increased from 16/1 to 20/2 Mbit/s and from 25/2 to 40/2 Mbit/s. Following the functional separation in June 2015, the DSL infrastructure is now maintained by CETIN. In November 2015 upload speed was increased up to 4 Mbit/s [40/4 Mbit]. VDSL2 Annex Q (profile 35b) is available since May 2017. As of mid-2018, the speed profiles offered are 2/0,2 Mbit/s (ADSL/VDSL2), 8/0,5 Mbit/s (ADSL/VDSL2), 16/0,7 Mbit/s (ADSL2+), 24/2 Mbit/s (VDSL2), 50/5 Mbit/s (VDSL2), 100/10 Mbit/s (VDSL2) and 250/25 Mbit/s (VDSL2 profile 35b). Vectoring is to be rolled out till the end of 2018 in the FTTC deployments (approx. 4100 remote DSLAMs in mid-2018 with a plan for a total of 10500 remote DLSAMs in 2022). CETIN also plans to start offering VDSL bonding till mid-2019. This bonding is though limited to maximum aggregate speed of 250 Mbit/s, bonding of lines with 35b at max rate isn't supported
Cyprus (VDSL2)	No VDSL products have appeared from telecom operators in Cyprus yet. OCECPR (NRA) has amended the Frequency Management Plan to facilitate the introduction of VDSL2 and launched its respective consultation.
Denmark (VDSL)	TDC is providing VDSL in two larger city areas in Copenhagen and Aarhus from February 2008, most urban parts (100 largest city areas) was announced for March 2008, but this was changed to September 2008. Fullrate and Telenor are providing VDSL the same places as TDC, as they have access to their nodes.
Denmark (VDSL2)	TDC launched VDSL2 on January 21, 2008.; Telenor launched VDSL2 on August 23, 2013.; Fullrate launched VDSL2 on September 16, 2009, but only for customers on exchanges with Fullrate's own equipment, rather than exchanges with leased equipment from TDC. On September 29, 2010, Fullrate announced that they were able to provide VDSL2 to all Fullrate customers, regardless of exchange.
Estonia (VDSL2)	Elion launched VDSL2-based business services in 2010. Current packages include 10/5, 20/5, 20/10 and 30/10. From May 1, 2013, VDSL2 is also offered to private customers with speed 30/10. Some users have maximum of 40/10 as of 2016, due to EstWin project. Fiber optic cable is being built around the country and the old rural ADSL DSLAM stations are turned into VDSL2 if possible (within reasonable distance from the telephone exchange). Telia offers since May 2018 VDSL2+V 35b with speeds 200/50, 100/25 and 50/10 to customers with so called old telephone copper wire areas.
Finland (VDSL)	Provided in Oulu by DNA, in Turku by Sonera, in various cities by Nebula and in Helsinki and Tampere by Sonera. The services provided in Turku and Oulu are actually based on Cisco's LRE, although at least in Oulu the technology has since been changed to VDSL2. A few universities also provide fiber-optic VDSLs to their students.
Finland (VDSL2)	Saunalahti was to provide VDSL2 in December 2006 to small area as a pilot project, but was delayed until further notice due to low firmware satisfaction. In 2010 Saunalahti/Elisa provides VDSL2 subscriptions to some specific areas. An example: Elisa product with bundled IPTV services and 100/10 Mbit/s VDSL2 connection.; Päijät-Hämeen Puhelin started providing 100/64 Mbit/s VDSL2 subscriptions in 2007 Q1.; Nebula started providing VDSL2 pilot subscriptions during June 2007 and is currently offering commercial subscriptions in limited area.; Suomi Communication Oy Offers both SHDSL and VDSL2 subscriptions where available.; DNA Oy offers symmetric 100/100 Mbit/s VDSL2 connections at least in the Oulu area.; TeliaSonera offers VDSL2-based subscriptions in their "Kodin Netti" service, offering rates 1:1 Mbit/s, 10:10 Mbit/s and 100:10 Mbit/s.; PPO-Yhtiöt Oy offers VDSL2-based connections at speeds 10/10, 25/10, 50/10.
France (VDSL)	Erenis (bought by Neuf-Cegetel, now part of SFR) was offering both internet and telephone over VDSL in Paris using FTTB. The broadband was 60 Mbit/s downstream and 6 Mbit/s upstream. This offer has been discontinued in Q2-2007.; The French regulator, ARCEP, started to evaluate VDSL2 technology in FTTC mode in July 2011. They permitted the technology in April 2013 for a public launch later that year.; As of Q3 2013, the hosting provider and ISP, OVH, provides VDSL access in larger French cities (Paris, Lyon, Bordeaux, Lille).
France (VDSL2)	Erenis was deploying VDSL1 and VDSL2 (as fiber to the premises) until Neuf Cegetel, later absorbed by SFR, bought the company in April 2007. There was no further VDSL deployment in France because the standard has never been approved by the sole owner of the historical copper local loop (France Télécom). VDSL2 use cases has been evaluated by the DSL tech introduction workgroup. and validated on 26 April 2013. Real testing with large numbers of real customers began in parts of France until the first public offer in 2013 Q4.; Orange Since 10/01/2013 offer VDSL2-based connections at speeds up to 100/30 Mbit/s (usually between 15 and 50 Mbit/s down).; SFR Since 10/01/2013 offer VDSL2-based connections at speeds up to 100/40 Mbit/s.; Bouygues Telecom Since 10/01/2013 offer VDSL2-based connections at speeds up to 100/40 Mbit/s.; OVH 10/01/2013 offer VDSL2-based connections at speeds up to 92/36 Mbit/s.; Free Since 10/01/2013 offer VDSL2-based connections at speeds up to 100/40 Mbit/s.; All except OVH offer Quadruple play BOX.
Germany (VDSL2)	Deutsche Telekom initially started VDSL2 deployment in late 2006, with VDSL2 offered in the 12 largest cities in Germany, by 2007 residents in over 50 cities had access to VDSL2. While VDSL2 was originally only available to customers who purchased the triple-play package "Entertain" (starting at €54.95 per month for 25/5 Mbit/s or €59.95 for 50/10 Mbit/s), VDSL2 is now also available to double-play customers.; In August 2014, Deutsche Telekom began offering G.vector profile 17a based 100/40 Mbit/s service in new VDSL2 deployments. Existing VDSL2 deployments will largely be upgraded to G.vector. For its G.vector VDSL2 customer premises equipment, Deutsche Telekom has specified mandatory support for profiles 8b and 17a, with optional support for profile 30a.; In August 2018 Deutsche Telekom started offering VDSL2 G.vector profile 35b based products with either 250 or 175 Mbit/s downstream and 40 Mbit/s upstream to initially 6 million households with plans to extend the reach to 15 million households by the end of the same year.; Vodafone (formerly Arcor) and Telefónica Germany (marketed as O_{2}) provide VDSL2 with up to 50/20 Mbit/s through local-loop unbundling. These alternative providers also utilize G.vector to offer 100/40 Mbit/s service, however G.vector can only be feasibly deployed by one provider per serving area interface. The regulator Federal Network Agency created a "vectoring list", on which providers can claim cabinets on a first-come-first-served basis. This provider is required to offer bit-stream access to its competitors.; 1&1 Internet, Congstar, and easybell offer VDSL2 with up to 50/10 Mbit/s via bit-stream access to the access networks of Deutsche Telekom, Vodafone, and Telefónica Germany.
Gibraltar (VDSL2)	Gibtelecom Ltd, has rolled out VDSL2 since 2012, offering HSI at 100 Mbit/s, 50 Mbit/s, 32 Mbit/s and 16 Mbit/s.
Guernsey (VDSL2)	Launched VDSL services October 2011. Sure and JT Global on the Bailiwick of Guernsey now offer VDSL at max 40 Mbit/s download and max 5 Mbit/s upload speeds, up from the existing 20 Mbit/s / 800 kbit/s ADSL2 service. This is available to customers within 2 km of the exchange.
Greece (VDSL2)	CYTA Hellas, a subsidiary of CYTA, started offering VDSL2 services in Attica in mid-December 2011 and expanded to Thessaloniki and other major Greek cities in 2012.; OTE has been investing in VDSL2 as a transitional technology until FTTH hits the market. It started testing VDSL2 in 2008 and began gradual deployment of the service by Q4, 2012. Since mid-2013 OTE has been offering its VDSL2 services to an ever-increasing number of areas in the major metropolitan centres of Greece.; Most major ISPs in the country offer VDSL2 services using OTE's access network (FTTC), through the OTE Wholesale division.
Greenland (VDSL2)	Tele Greenland is running VDSL2 on Ericsson DSLAMs as a part of FTTN, since 2009.
Hungary (VDSL)	Starting in October 2008 the largest Hungarian incumbent offers 25 Mbit/s subscriptions to approximately 100,000 households after upgrading part of their network to VDSL.
Hungary (VDSL2)	T-Home is providing VDSL2 in select areas at 30 mbit download speed and 5 mbit upload speed.
Iceland (VDSL)	Provided in Akureyri/North East by Tengir.; The telecom company Síminn is now implementing VDSL to much of the capital of Reykjavík, starting in 2010. The service is known as Ljósnet and most of the connections available with this service are VDSL2 but some users are apparently being offered GPONsame marketing name.; Vortex sells VDSL.
Iceland (VDSL2)	TSC has been running VDSL on TUT DSLAM since 2002 and is now running VDSL2 on SINO Telcom DSLAM.; TSC is believed to be the first company to run VDSL on public telephone lines.; Síminn is running VDSL2 on Alcatel-Lucent DSLAM as a part of FTTC.
Ireland (VDSL2)	Current service: OpenEir, the wholesale arm of Ireland's largest telecommunications provider currently provides vectored VDSL2 services offering speeds of up to 100 Mbit/s (down) and 20 Mbit/s (up). The majority of lines are connected to FTTC cabinets. However, due to the topology of the copper network, a small share of lines are also served directly from VDSL2 equipment located in local telephone exchange.; Description of service: The network supports multicasting for IPTV services and customers can be provided either with a standalone VDSL2 connection, or VDSL2 bundled with a POTS service. Most ISP's residential gateway devices contain a VoIP ATA which can be used to provide classic telephony services without using the legacy PSTN infrastructure.; Physical interface: Each ISP provides its own modem/access gateway, to a standardised network interface specification. New VDSL2 installations require a site visit to install a NTU (Network Termination Unit) - a modular telephone socket with an optional integrated filter which is connected directly to the incoming line, ahead of any other internal wiring. This ensures optimal service by eliminating possible line noise or problematic internal wiring. It also provide a testable, demarcation point between the customer's internal wiring and the OpenEir network - and has an RJ11 test socket behind the face plate. For this reason, unlike ADSL services, self-installation is not available, unless a VDSL2 service was already in place. The filter plate installed on the NTU provides three connection terminals: an unfiltered socket for the VDSL2 modem (RJ45 socket that accepts an RJ11 plug), a filtered RJ11 socket for analogue telephone service and a filtered screw-down wiring terminal, located on the back of the faceplate, where extension sockets can be connected. The socket device also provides a range of wiring options for connecting monitored alarms and other specialist services.; VDSL2 providers: As OpenEir is a wholesale provider, ISP services are sold by a wide range of operators including (non-exhaustively): Airwire, BBnet, Digiweb, Eir (retail arm), Fastcom, Host Ireland (Business broadband), IFA Telecom, Invertec, Lightnet, Magnet Networks, Net1, Pure Telecom, Regional Broadband, Ripplecom, Sky Ireland, Telcom, Three Ireland, Viatel, Vodafone Ireland, Westnet and Wireless Connect. (Most provide home and business broadband while some are focused exclusively on the commercial sector.); Planned services (2018) 35b 'super vectoring' is being deployed, and expected to launch later in 2018. This will provide speeds of up to 250 Mbit/s (technically the standard supports up to 300 Mbit/s).; History of VDSL/VDSL2 in Ireland: Eircom first launched its FTTC (fibre to the cabinet) VDSL2 network on 20 May 2013. The service, called eFibre, had initial speeds of 70 Mbit/s download and 20 Mbit/s upload The network was designed with vectoring in mind, the DSLAMs and end-user modems were specified to support it from the start.
Isle of Man (VDSL2)	ISPs on the Isle of Man offer VDSL2 Profile 35b vectored at max 200 Mbit/s download and max 20 Mbit/s upload speeds and profile 17a Vectored at 100 Mbit/s down and 10 Mbit/s up.
Italy (VDSL2)	Fastweb launched its service based on VDSL2 with which customers will benefit from speed of 200 Mbit/s download and 30 Mbit/s upload (VDSL2 35b) in more than 130 cities (FTTC SLU). Fastweb has announced a new plan to expand the network to ultra-wideband which will be completed at the end of 2020, to reach about 40% of the Italian population. Fastweb also providing 100/20 Mbit/s (VDSL2 17a) and 200/20 Mbit/s (VDSL2 35b) in more than 900 cities via kit VULA (wholesale Telecom Italia); Vodafone providing 100/20 Mbit/s in more than 101 Italian cities (FTTC SLU). The aim is to reach 40% of the Italian population by 2020. Vodafone also providing 200/20 Mbit/s (VDSL2 35b) in more than 1683 cities via kit VULA (wholesale Telecom Italia).; Tiscali offers VDSL2 profile 100/20 Mbit/s (VDSL2 17a) and 200/20 Mbit/s (VDSL2 35b) in more than 196 Italian cities via kit VULA (wholesale Telecom Italia).; Infostrada offers VDSL2 profile 100/20 Mbit/s (VDSL2 17a) and 200/20 (VDSL2 35b) in more than 647 Italian cities via kit VULA (wholesale Telecom Italia).; Telecom Italia offering 3 profiles for FTTC: 30/3 Mbit/s, 100/20 Mbit/s (VDSL2 17a) and 200/20 Mbit/s (VDSL2 35b). About 80% of the population is covered, but many less densely populated areas are not yet.
Lithuania (VDSL2)	VDSL2 is offered by Telia Lithuania, since 2018. Has three download speed tiers of 19 Mbit/s and 100 Mbit/s or 250 Mbit/s. The highest tier cost is €15.90 or €14.90 per month with a two-year contract. The lowest price tier is €10.90 per month with a two-year contract.
Luxembourg (VDSL2)	Post Luxembourg has offered a 30 Mbit/s down, 10 Mbit/s up VDSL2 service since 2011. As of mid-2014, offerings also include 100 Mbit/s down, 50 Mbit/s up over bonded VDSL2, and faster services using FTTK or FTTP. Alternative providers, including Luxembourg Online, Orange and Tango offer similar products.
Malta (VDSL)	VDSL is deployed in Malta by GO at speeds of up to 35 Mbit/s downstream and 2 Mbit/s upstream.
Monaco (VDSL2)	VDSL2, at a 30 Mbit/s downstream / 2 Mbit/s upstream rate, is offered to residential clients of Monaco Telecom, the incumbent monopoly operator for fixed lines, television and internet provision. In February 2011, this internet service cost €35 per month, and use of the provided Monaco Telecom "MT Box", a rebranded Thomson TG789vn or TG789vn v3 modem since 2013, was obligatory.; Since mid-2014 the maximum reachable speeds are 65 Mbit/s downstream / 8 Mbit/s upstream.
Netherlands (VDSL)	VDSL(2) is offered by KPN. KPN hardly invested in ADSL2+ in 2006, despite the current coverage of only 57% (2007), because they saw a better future in VDSL. In 2014 KPN started offering vectoring for new customers and speeds up to 80 Mbit/s down and 8 Mbit/s up are reported.; VDSL is rolled out by Tele2 in 25 cities on September 1, 2009.
Netherlands (VDSL2)	KPN has been offering a FttC VDSL2 service since 2009 and VDSL-CO ("Central Office") since 2010. KPN planned to offer VDSL-BR ("Buiten Ring", Outer Ring) starting from Q2 2011. KPN is offering VDSL both retail and wholesale. In 2014 KPN started to offer vectoring for new customers with speeds up to 80 Mbit/s down and 8 Mbit/s up.; KPN subsidiaries XS4All and Telfort also offer VDSL2 to their customers.; Tele2 started offering VDSL2 under the FiberSpeed name in 2009.; BBned, now a Tele2 subsidiary, started offering VDSL2 in 2010.
Norway (VDSL)	VDSL2 was first announced by NextGenTel at the start of 2009, and is now also offered by Tafjord Marked (Mimer) in Ålesund, PowerTech Information Systems in Tønsberg and Oslo and Drangedal Everk (DEAN) in Drangedal. Telenor started offering VDSL subscriptions on February 1, 2011. Speeds are 25/5, 30/10 and 40/10. NextGenTel has different speeds (30/5 and 40/20) and Powertech has only one tier of 50/20.
Norway (VDSL2)	NextGenTel offers VDSL2 nationwide.; Broadnet and Homenet offers VDSL2 nationwide.; Telenor offers VDSL2 nationwide.; Netpower provide VDSL2 in the cities Oslo, Bergen, Stavanger, and Sandnes.; Noraxess provides VDSL2 in cities around Helgeland. With speeds up to 50/20 Mbit/s.; PowerTech provides VDSL2 in Oslo and Akershus.; StayOn provides VDSL2 and VDSL2 bonding in Møre og Romsdal.
Poland (VDSL)	VDSL2 is offered by Orange Polska in two download speed tiers of 40 Mbit/s and 80 Mbit/s. The highest tier cost is $31 or €24 per month with a two-year contract.
Poland (VDSL2)	Orange Polska has provided VDSL2 with speeds up to 80/8 Mbit since July, 2011.; Netia provides VDSL2 at 50/5 Mbit/s since December 2010.
Portugal (VDSL2)	
Romania (VDSL)	VDSL2 is offered in urban areas by Romtelecom at speeds of 30 Mbit/s up to 100 Mbit/s for €10.54 per month with unlimited traffic and including a phone line.
Romania (VDSL2)	Telekom Romania has offered VDSL2 at maximum 100 Mbit/s download and 32 Mbit/s upload since 2011 in 50 cities.
Russia (VDSL)	VDSL appeared on 8 February 2005. It is provided by SCTS, offers Internet speeds ranging from 4:1.5 Mbit/s to 12:6 Mbit/s at Saratov city. Connection costs around €7-50 per month (including 125–1024 MB of external incoming traffic). Traffic costs around €0.03-0.05 per megabyte.
Serbia (VDSL2)	VDSL2 has been provided to customers of the largest telecommunication operator Telekom Srbija, since February 1, 2013, for a two-year subscription plan or monthly payments for personal use.
Slovakia (VDSL2)	Slovak Telekom has provided VDSL2 to customers since September 2013. Speeds up to 90/9 Mbit/s were available in 2021. VDSL2 vectoring is used as of 2020.
Slovenia (VDSL)	VDSL appeared on October 1, 2005. It is provided by T-2, offering triple play services with Internet speeds ranging from 1 Mbit/s:256 kbit/s (€16) to 60:25 Mbit/s (€73) at more than 120 locations across the country (75% coverage). A 40:15 Mbit/s connection costs €63 per month.
Slovenia (VDSL2)	AMIS has provided VDSL2 to corporate customers since 2013.; TušTelekom provides VDSL2 to enterprises.; Telekom Slovenije has provided VDSL2 since March 5, 2007 to its customers.; T-2 has provided VDSL2 to customers since May 2007 and offers speeds up to 60/25 Mbit/s on copper phone lines.
Spain (VDSL)	VDSL roll-out by Telefonica began in 2005 in selected places in Madrid. The commercial launch was in September 2009 (combined with free national telephone calls and TV-over-IP service) and December 2009 (combined with free national calls).
Spain (VDSL2)	Movistar tested the deployment of VDSL2 and planned to provide VDSL2 in beginning in2007 or 2008, but its commercial deployment was delayed until 2009. Their VDSL2 offer consists of a 30 Mbit/s access with an upload capacity of 1 Mbit/s.; Jazztel Introduced VDSL2 in April 2010. It has finished the deployment of the technology on its network and offers 30 Mbit/s over VDSL2 with an upstream rate of 3.5 Mbit/s.
Sweden (VDSL2)	Telenor and Telia are negotiating a joint venture to deploy the VDSL2 infrastructure at a cost of 10 billion Swedish kronor.; Bredbandsbolaget started conducting VDSL2 tests October 2005, Bredbandsbolaget is now a part of Telenor.; On March 13, 2008 TeliaSonera announced it would start deploying VDSL2. Telia are talking about 30 to 70 Mbit/s in downstream.; On March 18, 2008, Bredbandsbolaget announced it would start deploying VDSL2 on March 25, 2008. BBB is now offering VDSL2 at 60:20 Mbit/s for customers closer than 800 meters to telephone stations and 40/10 for customers between 800 and 1500 meters away.
Switzerland (VDSL)	Used in the Swisscom TV (former: Bluewin TV) television-over-IP service and in the DSL service with up to 50 Mbit/s downstream and 5 Mbit/s upstream, introduced with lower bitrates in November 2006. In 2007, voters in Zurich approved the installation of Fibre (and not VDSL) infrastructure. This "Fiber to the Home" network would be run by the city's power company and would offer maximum speeds of around 100 Mbit bandwidth, though it was not clear what the upload speeds or pricing would be. The Swiss telecom giant Swisscom offers VDSL2 in most of Switzerland and is currently migrating the ADSL-lines to VDSL2.
Switzerland (VDSL2)	Swisscom is deploying VDSL2 and it has been available to customers since July 1, 2007. Since December 2006 it is in use for IPTV. Sunrise offers VDSL2 G.Vector (ITU-T G.993.5) and is migrating the ADSL-lines to VDSL2 with offered DSLAM-throughput currently (July 2018) (profile 17a) between 110,080 and 5,504 kbit/s downstream and between 5,504 and 0 kbit/s upstream with copper twisted pair lines.
Turkey (VDSL)	Turk Telekom has offered VDSL2 services for resale by Turkish ISPs since July 1, 2008 across 73 of Turkey's 81 provinces. Packages ranging from 20 Mbit/s download/1 Mbit/s upload to 100 Mbit/s download/4 Mbit/s upload speeds are available. 20 Mbit/s will sell for approximately $20, while 100 Mbit/s will sell for $66. Turkish ISP's that will offer the service include TTNET, Tellcom, Biri, Plusnet and D-Smart.
Turkey (VDSL2)	TTNet provides VDSL2 service in 20 Mbit/s, 35 Mbit/s, 50 Mbit/s and 100 Mbit/s.; TurkNet provides VDSL2 service in 24 Mbit/s, 35 Mbit/s, 75 Mbit/s and 100 Mbit/s.; Millenicom Türkiye (Doping Internet) provides VDSL2 service in 24 Mbit/s, 35 Mbit/s, 50 Mbit/s and 100 Mbit/s.; Turkcell provides VDSL2 service in 24 Mbit/s.; Plusnet VDSL2 service in 24 Mbit/s, 35 Mbit/s, 50 Mbit/s and 100 Mbit/s.
United Kingdom (VDSL)	British Telecom and resellers: Openreach, the Access Network delivery arm of BT Group conducted successful trials of VDSL using FTTC technology in the Muswell Hill area of North London. Following this trial national rollout commenced under the banner of NGA (Next Generation Access) starting with selected exchange areas around the UK. The product initially offered downstream bit rates of up to 40 Mbit/s and upstream of up to 10 Mbit/s dependent on the distance between the new DSLAM street-cabinet and the end user's premises, and by late 2012, this had increased to downstream bit rates of up to nearly 80 Mbit/s and upstream of up to 20 Mbit/s. Alongside this, Openreach are conducting additional trials into the deployment of FTTP (Fibre to the Premises) which although more expensive and complex to implement, can provide downstream rates of up to 110 Mbit/s and is thought to be more future-proofed than FTTC. Recently this has been improved to 330 Mbit/s downstream and 30 Mbit/s upstream. Original projections indicated that FTTC was significantly cheaper to implement than FTTP; however, current thinking is that the cost difference between the two technologies may be smaller than first envisaged.; As of 2011, the Openreach product is also resold by other ISPs.; Other providers: A number of smaller regional ISPs also exist and sell VDSL based services.; For example, Rutland telecom currently offer VDSL technology in some parts of the UK, mainly focused around the county of Rutland. Rutland telecom was the first ISP to offer VDSL services in the UK. Also ask4 Ltd, Ripwire & DRBSY LTD announced the availability of up to 40 Mbit/s VDSL services for business users and consumers across South Yorkshire which utilises the infrastructure being rolled out by the four main councils in the area; Sheffield, Rotherham, Doncaster and Barnsley (collectively known as Digital Region Ltd), an EU government-backed project. The network offers up to 40 Mbit/s downstream and up to 10 Mbit/s upstream with an assured level of service. The infrastructure consists of FTTC (Fibre to the Cabinet) with sub loop unbundling to provide the last-mile connection to the consumer via existing copper.
United Kingdom (VDSL2)	BT Group tested VDSL2 in the Muswell Hill, London and Whitchurch, Cardiff Exchanges starting in July 2009. On 23 March 2009, they announced plans to deploy the service to 29 exchanges throughout England, Wales, Scotland and Northern Ireland. On 9 July 2009, they announced plans to deploy the service to a further 69 exchanges throughout the UK by the summer of 2010.; May 2010 BT announced £2.5 billion plans to roll out a mixture of VDSL2 FTTC (75%) and GPON FTTP (25%) to 66% of the UK by 2015 with VDSL2 speeds starting at 40 Mbit/s down 10 Mbit/s up potentially rising to 60 Mbit/s down 15 Mbit/s up. In October 2011, BT announced that this roll-out was being accelerated such that it would be completed by 2014 (one year earlier than originally planned). In April 2012 BT introduced new product download speeds of up to 80 Mbit/s down and 20 Mbit/s up on its VDSL2 network. This has been achieved by increasing ANFP spectrum usage to 17 MHz. BT announce FTTP On Demand — a GPON-based service to extend the fibre overlay in FTTC areas direct to the home to subscribers willing to pay (install costs not yet announced expected to be in high hundreds of pounds).: On 8 October 2009, it was revealed that Virgin Media would test VDSL2. Residents of Higher Pill, in Saltash, and nearby Hatt were to be offered free broadband via a VDSL2 line to a roadside cabinet. The cabinets were to be linked to Virgin Media backhaul via new fibre laid by Vtesse Networks through BT's local exchange, 5 km away.; The trial eventually resulted in Vtesse Networks running the final service without Virgin Media's involvement under their own brand on 1 October 2010.: Digital Region Ltd, an EU government-backed project formed by the four main councils in South Yorkshire – Sheffield, Rotherham, Doncaster and Barnsley, along with the Regional Development Agency, Yorkshire Forward, have rolled out VDSL2 services to over 80% of the county. The network was shut down in August 2014 having never passed 5,000 subscribers. The street furniture was disconnected from the power circuits (it piggybacked off streetlighting) in September through November.; LittleBigOne also joined the network in 2011, offering 40 Mbit/s VDSL services, including the first UK IPTV over VDSL service, which launched in early 2012. They were also to offer an "up to 100 Mbit" service starting in May 2012.; On 14 April 2010, Rutland Telecom announced that it is to deliver broadband speeds up to 40 Mbit/s using a fibre to the cabinet solution in the Welsh village of Erbistock. The initiative, backed by private investment, would be the first time that VDSL2 technology has been used in a Welsh rural village.; VDSL2 uses Profile 17a, Annex A, VLAN 101 and is capped at 80 Mbit/s download and 20 Mbit/s upload.

== North America ==
Canada (VDSL)	VDSL is offered in urban areas by MTS in Manitoba, SaskTel in Saskatchewan, WestNet, Lightspeed and Nucleus (ISP) in Alberta and British Columbia, Bell Internet, Nexicom, Acanac, iTeraTEL Communications, Contact and TekSavvy in Ontario, Bell Internet and Bell Aliant in Atlantic Canada, and Bell Satellite TV's service in some large multi-residential buildings in certain urban centres. Also, National Capital Freenet a non-profit provides xDSL at competitive rates to subscribers in Ottawa as well as low-cost broadband to community housing residents.
Canada (VDSL2)	SaskTel, a crown corporation of the province of Saskatchewan, has officially announced the deployment of VDSL2. SaskTel is using VDSL2 to increase the amount of bandwidth to its customers, allowing more HDTV streams with its MAX Entertainment Service. The extra bandwidth also allows SaskTel to offer their "Ultra" service providing 25 Mbit/s download and 2 Mbit/s upload to non-IPTV customers.; Bell Canada is currently offering VDSL2 in some areas of Ontario and Quebec with speeds reaching 50 Mbit/s download and 10 Mbit/s upload, marketed as Bell Fibe Internet, or part of the Bell Fibe TV package. For Fibe TV distance from cabinet to receiver must be equal to or less than 900 meters. Bell originally deployed Lucent Stinger remote SLAMs which did not conform to ITU G.993.2 spec and as a result is not compatible with standard VDSL2 modems and requires a custom firmware from modem vendors. Bell has recently started to deploy Alcatel-Lucent 7330 remote SLAMs which do conform to ITU G.993.2 spec and customers served on those are able to use standard VDSL2 modems.; TELUS is offering VDSL2 in a large percentage of its footprint in British Columbia, Alberta and parts of Québec with speeds reaching up to 75 Mbit/s download and 20 Mbit/s upload on a single cable pair, and up to 150 Mbit/s download and 40 Mbit/s upload utilizing loop bonding (two cable pairs).; Bell MTS, operating in the province of Manitoba, Offers VDSL2 in multiple communities. They currently offer VDSL2 speeds of up to 50 down and 5, depending on distance this is sometimes achieved via pair bonding. Bell MTS also provides POTS and IPTV over this network on both copper and fiber, typically using the Arris 5168 modem or the new Home Hub HH3300. They can provide up to 100 down, but rarely do this on the aging copper network. The company claims "65 per cent of Manitoba households will have access to very high-speed Internet delivered by FTTH or VDSL technology." Communities with Fiber service can be provided with 25,50,100,150,300 or 1GPS download speed. The other communities outside of VDSL2 or fiber are generally able to qualify for ADSL service.
Mexico (VDSL2)	As of February 2012, Telmex has announced plans to partner with Alcatel-Lucent to deploy VDSL2 in multiple cities and ultimately serve millions of customers.
United States (VDSL)	CenturyLink Formally offered VDSL but has since migrated all VDSL locations to VDSL2+ or Vectored VDSL2+; AT&T provides Internet access and television service over VDSL in several regions under the trade-name U-verse. The AT&T service is based on FTTN; FTTP is also used.; Verizon offers VDSL in MDUs when running FTTP, CAT5e or coax to individual units is not practical.; LocalTel Communications of Wenatchee, WA offers a single VDSL line to an apartment complex next to their Network Operations Center. Offering 100 Mbit/s Down and 100 Mbit/s up.; Frontier Communications now offers Bonded ADSL and VDSL service with speeds of up to 40 Mbit/s downstream and 10 Mbit/s upstream in all of its major services areas like Fort Wayne, IN, Rochester, NY, New Haven, CT, and Bloomington, IL, suburbs of Minneapolis, MN as well as more rural markets.
United States (VDSL2)	AT&T has deployed Alcatel-Lucent VDSL2 equipment (video-ready access devices) in street cabinets as a part of its "AT&T Internet" (previously marketed as U-verse) service in fiber to the node (FTTN) based service areas with speeds of up to 100/20. U-verse originally used a fiber to the curb (FTTC) setup but later on downgraded to a FTTN setup. As of 2022 AT&T is not deploying FTTN VDSL2 to any new service locations, and has placed a far greater focus on expanding its FTTH "AT&T Fiber" internet service. iNIDs or the Motorola NVG 589 gateway are used in a pair-bonding setup to extend the reach of their FTTN configuration.; CenturyLink — formerly Qwest, Embarq and CenturyTel;— is currently expanding their VDSL2+ network and upgrading existing VDSL2+ to Vectored VDSL2. They are currently offers VDSL+ technology in most of the mid to large size markets. Some areas currently have VDSL2 service up to 60 Mbit/s downstream and 5 Mbit/s upstream on a single circuit and up to 100 Mbit/s downstream and 10 Mbit/s upstream on a bonded circuit. The newer Vectored VDSL2+ service up to 80 Mbit/s downstream and 10 Mbit/s upstream on a single circuit and up to 140 Mbit/s downstream and 10 Mbit/s upstream on a bonded circuit. In their Largest markets they are currently rolling out Prism IPTV service.; BellSouth had planned to roll out VDSL2 to its customers prior to its acquisition by AT&T. Many of those markets have since been included in the U-verse rollout.; Sonic.net is in the process of upgrading some customers in San Francisco to VDSL2.; Frontier Communications currently offers VDSL2 service in a number of areas it services. In some locations, VDSL2 service is available only to business subscribers, and customers might be required to change their residential account to a business account in order to receive VDSL2 service on their line.; North State Communications has recently started offering VDSL2 service in select areas.; Price County Telephone Company has recently started offering VDSL2 service in select areas.

== Oceania ==
Australia (VDSL)	The sole VDSL supplier in Canberra is TransACT, which uses Marconi VDSL for digital TV, Internet and WAN applications over its Fibre-To-The-Curb network. Services are now delivered primarily using VDSL2 in a Fibre-To-The-Node model as below.
Australia (VDSL2)	EFTel commenced a rollout of VDSL2-compatible MSAN (Multi-Service Access Node) technology to exchanges across Australia as part of its BroadbandNext network. As of September 2008, EFTel has successfully installed MSANs in 55 exchanges in readiness for the ratification of VDSL2 in Australia.; iiNet began trialling VDSL in Perth in December 2008 offering 100 Mbit/50 Mbit speeds.; As of December 2008, iiNet was trialling VDSL2 in a FTTB (Fibre To The Building) deployment to residential apartment blocks, with a view to further deployments in 2009.; Private network deployment of VDSL2 has been occurring since 2007 in apartment blocks using [Zyxel]- and [Huawei]-based products across Australia.; In 2009, TransACT commenced greenfield roll-out for MDU and upgrade of TransACT's existing VDSL access network to VDSL2, utilising Ericsson EDAs. (as of 2014 also using the Huawei MA5616); In 2010, Adam Internet deployed a VDSL2 network available to residents at The Precinct.; In 2010, Apex Telecom (defunct) commenced a greenfield roll-out for MDUs and gated communities.; In 2013 TPG Telecom announced its intention to build an FTTB network covering around 500,000 premises.; In 2014, the conservative Abbott government mandated that the National Broadband Network (NBN Co) should include Vectored VDSL2 as part of the Multi-Technology Mix (in addition to GPON, Fixed Wireless, Satellite and HFC). NBN Co began FTTB and FTTN trials in 2014 with commercial services officially launched in September 2015.. This was widely panned as "Fraudband".
New Zealand (VDSL)	VDSL2 is widely available in towns and cities throughout New Zealand that have been cabinetised as part of Chorus' NGN (Next Generation Network) rollout. Available profiles are 8B (50 Mbit/s) and 17A (100 Mbit/s); which profile is deployed is determined automatically by a process called Dynamic Line Management and may change due to changes in the stability or noise levels on the line. All plans are upload speed limited to 10 Mbit/s.; VDSL2 was made available to some business customers of Vodafone New Zealand utilising the network assets of TelstraClear (which Vodafone acquired in 2012). Vodafone went on to make VDSL available to all customers on January 23, 2014.
New Zealand (VDSL2)	TelstraClear (now Vodafone NZ) has begun offering VDSL2 through 140 cabinets on its own Next IP Network in seven city centres. The VDSL2 service is currently available in business districts of Wellington, Hamilton, Tauranga, Napier, Wanganui, New Plymouth, Lower Hutt, and parts of Auckland, offering download speeds up to 30 Mbit/s and upload speeds up to 7 Mbit/s. TelstraClear plans to expand coverage by Christmas 2008 to Dunedin, Palmerston North, Christchurch, Auckland, North Shore, Manukau and Waitakere.; Orcon signed a NZ$30 million deal with Siemens to roll out VDSL2 in 2008. Orcon's network would cover Auckland, Christchurch, Wellington, Hastings, Napier, Tauranga, Hamilton, Dunedin, Nelson and New Plymouth with "packages of broadband, video services, internet television and a phone line for $50 to $60 a month.". As of January 2014, they offer ADSL2+, FTIH and VDSL2.; Telecom NZ and Vodafone NZ were also testing VDSL2, but were waiting for an agreement on ways to handle interference before deploying it alongside other equipment in Telecom exchanges.; Vodafone NZ announced in May 2008 that VDSL2 would be offered in the Auckland area, with availability taking place as each exchange was unbundled. Full Auckland coverage was expected by the end of 2008, but was not launched until January 2014; The wholesale division of Telecom NZ has commenced laboratory testing of VDSL2 technology. If successful VDSL2 is likely to augment its current ADSL2+ capabilities over time, especially where unbundled loop lengths are short enough (approx 1 km) to benefit from the increased speeds.; On 30 January 2009 Telecom NZ announced its roll out of VDSL2 coverage. The rollout commenced in September 2010.; SNAP! launched their VDSL plans on 9 July 2013.; Telecom NZ announced retail VDSL plans on 13 July 2013.; As of 25 November 2015 VDSL speeds are 30 Mbit/s - 100 Mbit/s downstream and 5 Mbit/s - 50 Mbit/s Upstream.

== South America ==
Argentina (VDSL)	Since mid-2009, Iplan networks NSS started providing FTTN VDSL home connections in the city of Buenos Aires and main areas of La Plata, Quilmes, Lomas de Zamora, Córdoba, Rosario and Mar del Plata. The home service is available through their "Internet Optimo" plan which goes from 2 MB up to 10 MB (80 Mbit/s), providing the same download and upload speed (starting at ARS162 -US$40.50- for 2 Mbit/s).
Argentina (VDSL2)	IPLAN Telecomunicaciones is beginning to deploy Allied Telesis VDSL2 equipment to replace old LRE Cisco equipment among their 10K customers in Buenos Aires.; Telecom Argentina is offering VDSL 2 over ZyXEL VMG 1312 modems in the City of Buenos Aires and northern area in October 2015 and offering 20 and 50 MBit/Sec with unlimited local telephone calls starting at ARS 410 (US$43) per month.
Brazil (VDSL)	Vivo is providing a VDSL network that reaches speeds up to 50 Mbit/s and 5 Mbit/s upload in their service plans. The company uses equipment of Keymile and Zhone Technologies, Inc.
Brazil (VDSL2)	Vivo is using Zhone Technologies, Inc. Equipment to provide VDSL2 service to Belo Horizonte, Salvador, Brasília, Curitiba, Goiânia, Porto Alegre, Caxias do Sul, Campina Grande, Recife, Fortaleza, and other medium and small cities.; Sercomtel has deployed a new VDSL2+ network on Londrina city. Reaches speed up to 30 Mbit/s on downstream, and 15 Mbit/s upstream.; On 13 July 2012, TIM has announced their VDSL2 service in some locations from São Paulo and Rio de Janeiro, known as "Live TIM". In the announcement, a package with 25 Mbit/s on downstream (5 Mbit/s on upstream) would be available, but as of 2015, four different packages were available, varying from 35 Mbit/s to 90 Mbit/s on downstream (20 Mbit/s to 30 Mbit/s on upstream). In May 2014, TIM also announced a new package called "Live TIM Extreme" which uses FTTH technology to offer 1 Gbit/s on downstream (500 Mbit/s on upstream) and became, at that time, the fastest broadband connection available to the public in the country.; Oi is upgrading its DSL network gradually to VDSL2, offering speeds up to 35 Mbit/s.
Chile (VDSL)	As of November 2014, Movistar is providing a VDSL network in areas of Santiago, the capital city, with speeds up to 40 Mbit/s down and 5 Mbit/s up.
Chile (VDSL2)	Movistar has deployed almost 1000 cabinets with Nokia VDSL2 ISAM in a nationwide distribution including Santiago and start deploying Huawei VDSL2 equipment to some sectors in the city of Santiago.
Colombia (VDSL2)	EDATEL has deployed VDSL2 DSLAM in Cordoba, Antioquia, Sucre, city of Valledupar and municipality of Barrancabermeja.; ETB has deployed VDSL2 DSLAM in Bogotá city in a FTTC project.
