= Winder (surname) =

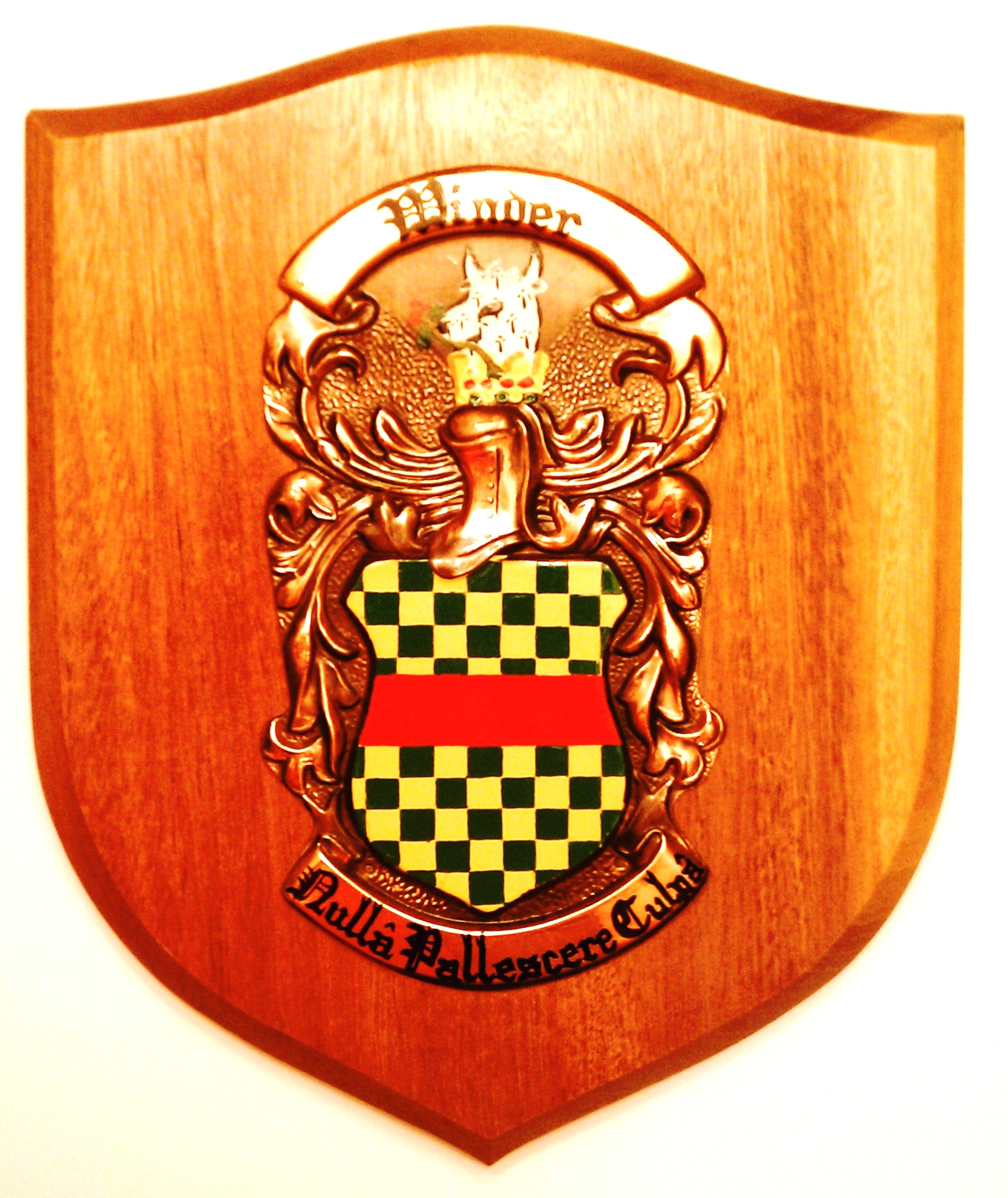
- Pronunciation: /ˈwɪndər, ˈwaɪ-/

Origin
- Language: Middle English
- Meaning: varied
- Region of origin: England

Other names
- Variant forms: Wynder, Windere, Winderes, Winders, Windhere, atte Wynde

Winder is a surname originating from England seen primarily in the United Kingdom and the English-speaking nations, but also in some places in mainland Europe, particularly Austria.

== Frequency ==
There are less than 11,000 Winders in the world, with about half of them – 5,259 – residing in the United States. The United Kingdom has the next highest population of those with this surname (2,547), followed by Canada (1,059), Austria (613), the Netherlands (356), New Zealand (277), Germany (237), Australia (215), Ireland (69), Poland (49) and Sweden (48).

On a per capita basis, the surname Winder is most common in Austria where there are 72.82 Winders for every million people. The appearance of the Winder surname in other nations, as expressed in frequency per million (FPM) is: New Zealand (63), the United Kingdom (60), Canada (31), Australia (22), the Netherlands (21), the United States (20), Ireland (15), Sweden (5), Germany (2), Denmark (1) and Poland (1).

In rank, Winder is the 2,415th most common surname in the U.K., the 6,023rd most common surname in the U.S., and the 7,054th most common surname in Australia.

In total numbers, the number of Winders in the United States is growing. The 1880 Census showed that there were 1,527 surnamed Winder, and by 2010 that had grown to 5,259. However, as a percentage of the population in the U.S., those surnamed Winder are growing less common. In 1880 for every million Americans there were 31 named Winder, and by 2010 there were only 20 Winders per million in the country.

== Origins ==
Although it is usually spelt the same, it appears that the surname Winder comes from two distinct sources. The two different pronunciations – wɪndər (with a short "i" as in "win") vs waɪndər (with a long "i" as in "why") – support this idea.

By 1891 in England there was a clear concentration of Winders in northern England (695 families in Lancashire and 385 in Yorkshire). There was also a distinct concentration in southern England (230 families in London, 123 in Kent, and 122 in Sussex).

=== Northern England origins ===
The Winder (wɪndər) name in northern England appears to be derived from place names. There are three places in north Lancashire called Winder, as well as places in Yorkshire, Westmorland, and Cumberland. The parish of Cartmel in Lancashire had a place called Winder as early as the 13th century, and there is evidence of families with the surname De Winder and De Winderghe there at that time. (Translated "of Winder".)

The name of Winder also came to England from Viking origins. Vikings moved from Ireland and the Isle of Man to settle Cumberland in the 10th century, and one of their chieftains was named Vinandr. Windermere, the largest natural lake in England and now a famous tourist attraction in modern Cumbria, derives its name from "Vinandr's lake" (Old Norse personal name 'Vinandr' + Old English 'mere').

The Winder (waɪndər) version with a long "i" as in "why" also appears occupational. In Lancashire county, well known for sheep farms and wool processing, a person who winds wool, thread, or yarn was called a winder. Just as a smith became known as Smith, so a winder became known as Winder.

In the Hundred Rolls of Lancashire of 1275, a Richard le Winder and Thomas le Winder are listed, the first known examples of someone bearing the surname. (Translated as Richard the Winder and Thomas the Winder.)

The branches of the northern Winders to first immigrate to America were the families of John Winder of Maryland (immigrated in 1665), John Winder of New York City (immigrated in 1674), and Thomas Winder of New Jersey (immigrated in 1703). Most of their American descendants pronounce the name "Winder" with a long "i".

=== Southern England origins ===
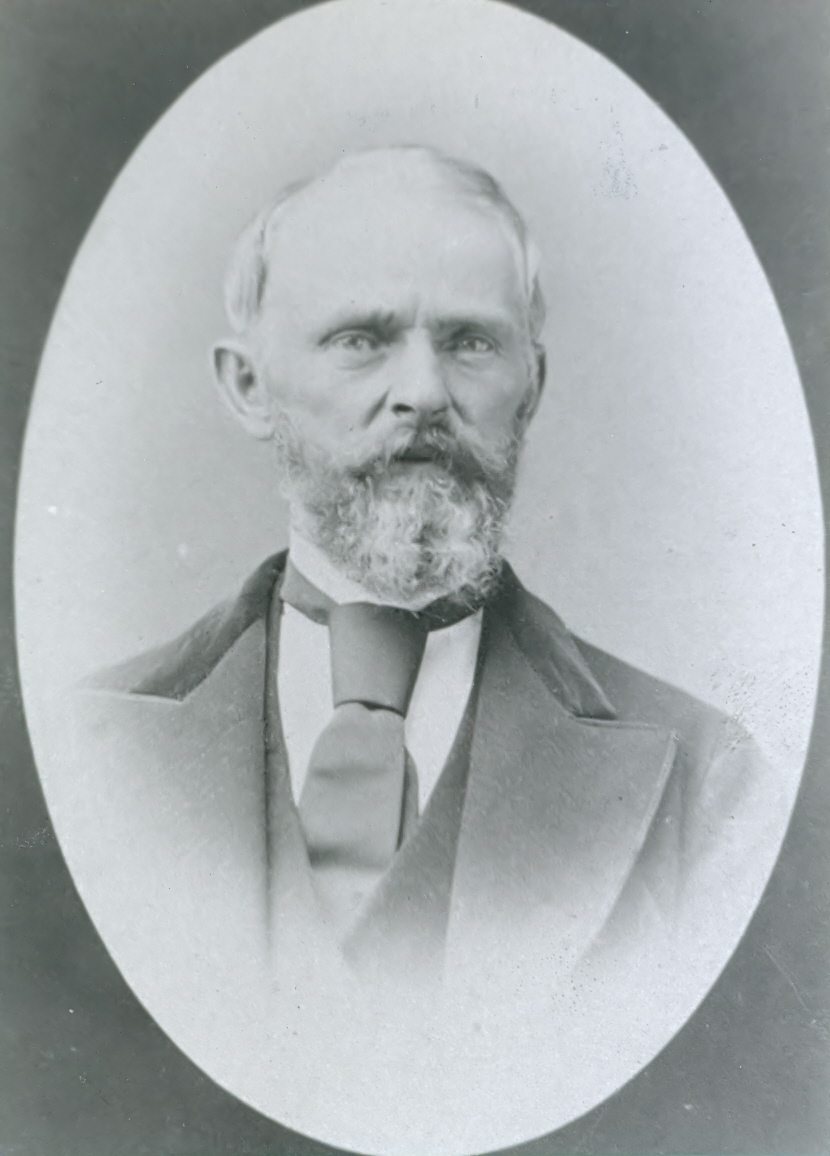
John Rex Winder, the patriarch of the Winder family in Utah, is from the southern England Winders.

In southern England, the pronunciation is with a short "i" (wɪndər), and a version of the name first appears in Hastings in the Hundred Rolls for Sussex taken in 1274. The sheriff, Matthew of Hastings, successfully appealed for the release of a group of six innocent men from jail, including William de la Wynde and his son John de la Wynde. Their French name literally means "William of the Wynde" and "John of the Wynde."

Wynde "is surely the old and correct pronunciation" of wind, pronounced with a short "i", "preserved to us even to the present day", according to an 1881 English study of etymology. It is seen spelled this way in fragments of Middle English poetry, such as the song of the western wind, Westron Wynde; and in a Saxon name for November—Wynde-Monað, or "wind month". While it is uncertain what it meant for a family to be known as being "of the Wind", this could refer to their home being in a particularly windy spot along the coast, or their being associated with a windmill. After all, the first vertical windmills in England were built in the late twelfth century and they would have been a new technology worth noting in the century afterward as surnames began to develop.

When the next great survey of England was taken, in the Sussex Subsidy of 1296, there are not many last names with both the French “de” and “le”, but instead there is the growing use of the Middle English contraction "atte" (meaning "at the"). That census records a Richard atte Wynde and a Robert atte Wynde, possible relatives or descendants of William de la Wynde or John de la Wynde mentioned in 1274 in Wilting (now part of Crowhurst), a location just three miles down the road.

Over the next century or two in Sussex, we see the "atte" at the start of these last names replaced with an "er" at the end. The name atte Stone becomes Stoner, atte Bridge becomes Bridger, atte Greene becomes Greener, atte Walle becomes Waller, and atte Wynde becomes Wynder.

The letter "y" was often used to represent the short "i" sound in Middle English, and even the will of Richard Wynder in 1555 used spellings such as "wyll" (will), "gyve" (give), "Alyce" (Alice), and "dyshes" (dishes). By the 16th century in the parish records in the counties of Sussex and Kent the surname is spelled interchangeably "Wynder" or "Winder", and by the 18th century "Winder" is the more frequent spelling.

The branch of this family to first come to America was that of the Mormon convert John Rex Winder, born in Biddenden, Kent who immigrated from England to Utah in 1853. This branch of the family pronounces the name "Winder" with the short "i", as in "win".

=== African-American origins ===
African Americans, most of whom are descendants of slaves, often used, or were given, the name of their owners. In some Southern states, between one-quarter to one-third of slaves after the American Civil War adopted the surnames of their last owners.

This explains why a number of African American families bear the English-originating surname Winder today. Examples include former Denver Broncos tailback Sammy Winder, and Brigham Young University basketball player Anson Winder.

The slaveholding Winders of antebellum America were descended from the northern England Winders, and pronounced their surname with a long "i", as in "why".

== Coat of arms ==
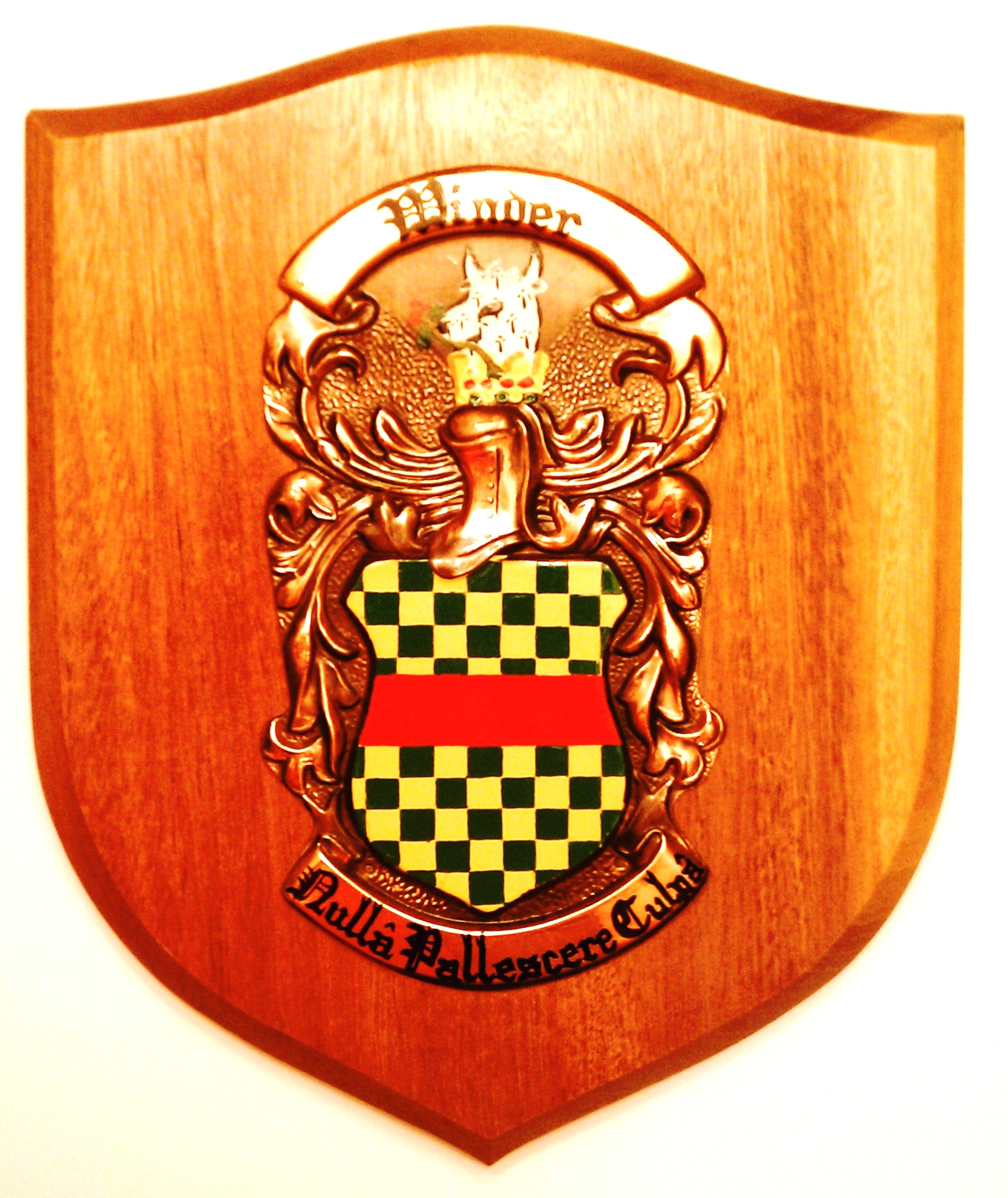

While a coat of arms does not belong to a surname, they are hereditary and belong not only to the individual to whom they were originally granted by the College of Arms in London, but to all of their male descendants. Therefore, after centuries, many sharing a surname also share a coat of arms.

Sir William Winder of Dufton, Cumberland, England (d. 1766) was granted a coat of arms by the College of Arms.

The arms are described as "chequy, Or and vert, a fess gules," meaning a gold and green checkerboard pattern, with a red band across the middle.

The crest is described as "Out of a ducal coronet Or, a bull's head ermine holding in the mouth a cherry branch slipped and fructed all proper."

The family motto is "Nulla pallescere culpa", translated "To turn pale at no crime."

== Notable people ==
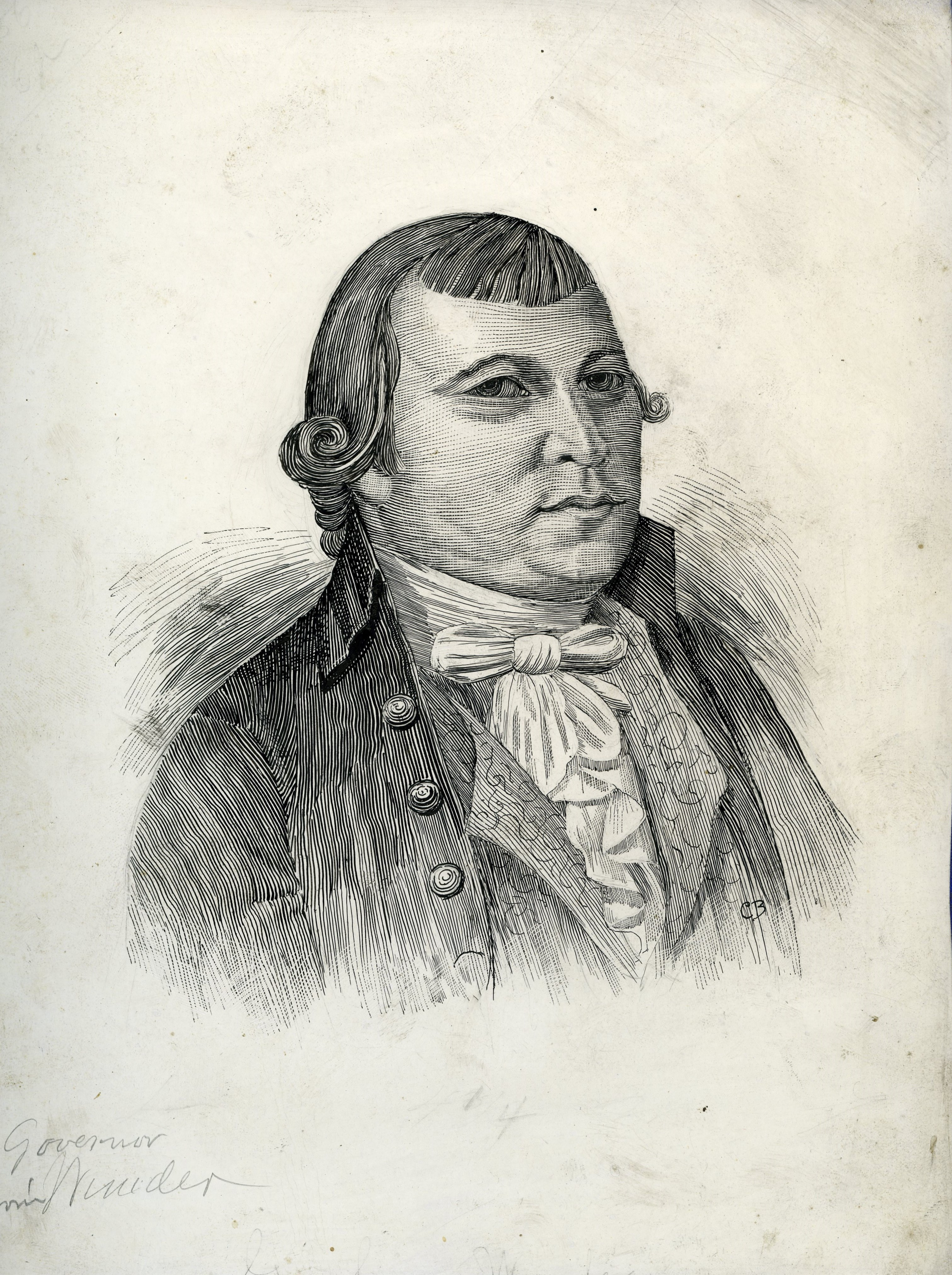
Levin Winder (1757–1819), the 14th governor of Maryland

- Aimee Winder Newton (born 1974), first female Republican member of the Salt Lake County Council
- Barbara W. Winder (1931–2017), General President of the Relief Society of the LDS Church
- Barney Winder (1884–1954), New Zealand rugby league footballer
- Catherine Winder, Canadian executive producer at LucasFilm Animation
- Charles Winder (1874–1921), American sport shooter who competed in the 1908 Olympics
- Charles Sidney Winder (1829–1862), Civil War Confederate general
- Chuck Winder, Idaho state senator since 2008
- Colton Winder, and wives Tami and Sophie, featured in the reality TV show Seeking Sister Wife
- Davey Winder, UK-based author, award-winning journalist and broadcaster
- David F. Winder (1946–1970), US Army Vietnam War medic posthumously awarded the Medal of Honor
- David Winder, (1824–1912), British portrait painter
- David Kent Winder (1932–2009), United States federal judge
- Frank Winder (1928–2007), Irish biochemistry professor, naturalist and rock climber
- Henry Winder (1693–1752), English minister and chronologist
- John H. Winder (1800–1865), Civil War Confederate general
- John R. Winder (1821–1910), a general authority of The Church of Jesus Christ of Latter-day Saints
- Josh Winder (born 1996), American baseball player
- Levin Winder (1757–1819), American Revolutionary War officer and governor of Maryland
- Liam Winder, British entrepreneur and designer, founder of Ripwire, LinkTagger and MetaFortyTwo
- Michael Winder, drummer for the Irish pop band Talulah Does The Hula
- Michael K. Winder (born 1976), American businessman, historian and politician
- Richard W. Winder (1924–2015), mission president and temple president for the LDS Church
- Robert Winder, British author and cricket player
- Ruth Winder (born 1993), British-born American racing cyclist
- Sammy Winder (born 1959), American former National Football League player
- Susan W. Tanner (born 1953), née Winder, General President of the Young Women's Organization for the LDS Church
- William H. Winder (1775–1824), War of 1812 U.S. general
