= Elaine L. Jack =

Canadian-American LDS Church leader (1928–2025)

12th Relief Society General President
- March 31, 1990 – April 5, 1997
- Called by: Ezra Taft Benson
- Predecessor: Barbara W. Winder
- Successor: Mary Ellen W. Smoot

Second Counselor in the Young Women General Presidency
- April 4, 1987 – March 31, 1990
- Called by: Ardeth G. Kapp
- Predecessor: Jayne B. Malan
- Successor: Janette H. Beckham

Personal details
- Born: Elaine Low; March 22, 1928; Cardston, Alberta, Canada
- Died: June 10, 2025 (aged 97); Holladay, Utah, U.S.
- Alma mater: University of Utah
- Spouse(s): Joseph E. Jack
- Children: 4

Elaine Jack (née Low; March 22, 1928 – June 10, 2025) was the twelfth Relief Society general president of the Church of Jesus Christ of Latter-day Saints (LDS Church) from 1990 to 1997. She also served in the general presidency of the church's Young Women organization from 1987 to 1990. Jack was the first Relief Society General President to be born outside of the United States.

== Background ==
Elaine Low was born and raised in Cardston, Alberta, Canada to Sterling Oliver and Lovina (Anderson) Low. She grew up a block away from the Cardston Alberta Temple, where her parents had been sealed. As a teenager she was the scribe for her grandfather, John Anderson, as he gave patriarchal blessings in a room adjacent to the foyer of the temple. She played the organ in Sunday school, worked in a beauty shop and retail store, and was valedictorian of her class at Cardston High School. She attended the University of Utah, majoring in English.

She met Joseph E. Jack at the University of Utah, and they married in the Cardston Alberta Temple on September 16, 1948. They are the parents of four sons. They lived in Staten Island, New York as her husband pursued advanced medical studies.

They then moved to the Boston, Massachusetts area, where she served as president of the Relief Society of the Cambridge Branch. The Jacks then spent two years living in Sitka, Alaska while her husband was stationed there with the Public Health Service. In 1958, they moved to Salt Lake City, Utah, where Jack served as stake Relief Society president.

Jack died on June 10, 2025, at the age of 97.

== Public service ==
In public service, Jack was president of the Salt Lake County Medical Auxiliary. She served as a member of the Women's Legislative Council and the Salt Lake Council of Women. She was also a lecturer for the American Cancer Society.

== LDS Church service ==
Jack was called by Belle S. Spafford to serve as a member of the Relief Society General Board in 1972. She served on the curriculum, general conference, and recreation and community outreach committees. She continued her service under Barbara B. Smith until they were both released in 1984.

At the LDS Church's April 1987 general conference, Jack was called as second counselor to Ardeth G. Kapp in the General Young Women Presidency, where she worked on producing leadership materials. She served in this capacity until the April 1990 general conference, when she was called to succeed Barbara W. Winder as the president of the Relief Society.

Jack served as the Relief Society General President from 1990 to 1997, with Chieko N. Okazaki and Aileen H. Clyde as her counselors. Under their leadership, the Relief Society developed a new statement of purpose that read, "build personal testimony, bless the individual woman, develop and exercise charity, strengthen families, enjoy a unified sisterhood, be full participants in the blessings of the priesthood." Jack launched a worldwide gospel literacy initiative in 1992. Regarding literacy, Jack said “The ability to read is more than just an earthly skill. It’s important to our eternal progression as well. If we’re going to bring souls to Christ, they must be able to understand the basic commandments and gospel principles that are in God’s word—the scriptures.” During her administration, policies shifted to include the Relief Society General Presidency more fully in general church council meetings.

Jack served as Relief Society General President until April 1997, when she was succeeded by Mary Ellen W. Smoot. Jack returned to Cardston, Alberta, and served as matron of the Cardston Alberta Temple from 1997 to 2000, while her husband served as temple president.

== Publications ==
- Elaine L. Jack (1992). Eye to Eye, Heart to Heart (Salt Lake City, Utah: Deseret Book) ISBN 0-87579-603-6

The Church of Jesus Christ of Latter-day Saints titles
Preceded by Barbara W. Winder	Relief Society General President; March 31, 1990 – April 5, 1997	Succeeded by Mary Ellen W. Smoot
Preceded by Jayne B. Malan	Second Counselor in the Young Women General Presidency; April 4, 1987 – March 31, 1990	Succeeded by Janette Hales Beckham
