= David Winder =

David Winder may refer to:

- David F. Winder (1946–1970), United States Army Vietnam War medic posthumously awarded the Medal of Honor
- David Kent Winder (1932–2009), United States federal judge
- David Winder (artist) (1824–1912), British portrait painter
