= Mary Ellen W. Smoot =

American religious leader (1933–2025)

13th Relief Society General President
- April 5, 1997 – April 6, 2002
- Called by: Gordon B. Hinckley
- Predecessor: Elaine L. Jack
- Successor: Bonnie D. Parkin

Personal details
- Born: Mary Ellen Wood; August 19, 1933; Ogden, Utah, U. S.
- Died: February 10, 2025 (aged 91)
- Home town: Clearfield, Utah, U.S.
- Spouse(s): Stanley M. Smoot
- Children: 7

Mary Ellen Wood Smoot (August 19, 1933 – February 10, 2025) was the thirteenth Relief Society General President of the Church of Jesus Christ of Latter-day Saints (LDS Church) from 1997 to 2002.

== Background ==
Mary Ellen Wood was born in Ogden, Utah, and raised in Clearfield, Utah. Her parents, Melvin G. and LaVora Wood, had both been LDS missionaries. Her mother went on a mission to California in 1915, her father served in Texas. Her father managed a canning factory, her mother hired all of the female workers. She was born fifth in a family of six daughters.

In 1952, she married Stanley M. Smoot in the Salt Lake Temple. Smoot and her husband were the parents of seven children. The family lived in Centerville, Utah. She died on February 10, 2025, at the age of 91.

== LDS Church service ==
In 1983, Smoot and her husband moved to Ohio, where he served as president of the church's Ohio Columbus Mission, and, later, of the Ohio Akron Mission. From 1993 to 1997 the Smoots served as the directors of church hosting for VIPs that visited Temple Square and LDS Church headquarters in Salt Lake City, Utah. In 1998 she was given the Exemplary Womanhood Award by BYU. The Smoots helped fund construction of a replica of the original Brigham Young building, which burned to the ground in 1884, at This Is the Place Heritage Park in 2004.

At the church's April 1997 general conference, Smoot was accepted as the Relief Society General President, with Virginia U. Jensen and Sheri L. Dew as her counselors. Smoot succeeded Elaine L. Jack, who had served since 1990. Smoot was the first president to call an unmarried woman (Dew) as a member of the Relief Society General Presidency. Smoot was succeeded in 2002 by Bonnie D. Parkin. In her role as an LDS leader, she traveled throughout North and South America, and to a long list of countries including India, Russia, Nigeria, and Japan.

The purpose of the Relief Society, according to Smoot, is to "make sure the needs of the women within the boundary of our congregation (members of the LDS Church) are cared for." Under her leadership the Society participated in international humanitarian efforts, such as making and sending over 38,000 homemade quilts to relieve the suffering of refugees fleeing the Kosovo War, families left homeless by the 1999 İzmit earthquake, and elsewhere. She was politically active in family-related causes, serving in leadership positions in the World Congress of Families, to promote Christian family values. Nevertheless, the focus of her presidency was on helping the Relief Society's 4.4 million members share insight and inspiration with one another.

Under her leadership, the Relief Society was the fastest growing women's organization in the world. The Relief Society, which had 3.9 million members when she became president in 1997, had 4.4 million by 2002. In 1999 she introduced a new mission statement for the Relief Society. The Salt Lake Tribune described it as emphasizing women's role in, "strengthening testimonies of Jesus Christ, seeking inspiration from the Holy Ghost, rededicating themselves to home and family, performing community service, sustaining the faith's all-male priesthood and worshiping in the church's temples."

Smoot is profiled in the 2011 book Women of character: Profiles of 100 prominent LDS women. In 2016, she headed a committee that produced a history of Centerville, Utah, entitled Centerville Utah: Our American Hometown.

== Publications ==
- Mary Ellen W. Smoot and Mary Ellen Edmunds (2000). Sweet is the Work: How Relief Society Helps Bring Women to Christ (Salt Lake City, Utah: Bookcraft) ISBN 1-57345-790-6

== Notes ==
The Church of Jesus Christ of Latter-day Saints titles
Preceded by Elaine L. Jack	Relief Society General President; April 5, 1997 – April 6, 2002	Succeeded by Bonnie D. Parkin
