= Anne C. Pingree =

Second Counselor in the Relief Society General Presidency
- April 6, 2002 – March 31, 2007
- Called by: Bonnie D. Parkin
- Predecessor: Sheri L. Dew
- Successor: Barbara Thompson

Personal details
- Born: June 11, 1941 (age 85); Salt Lake City, Utah, United States
- Alma mater: University of Utah

Anne C. Pingree (June 11, 1941) is an American religious leader, teacher, and speaker. She served as second counselor to Bonnie D. Parkin in the Relief Society General Presidency of the Church of Jesus Christ of Latter-day Saints (LDS Church) from 2002 to 2007.

Pingree was born in Salt Lake City, Utah on June 11, 1941 to Ezra T. and Maude Erickson Clark. She obtained a bachelor's degree in English from the University of Utah and has been a literacy volunteer for Spanish-speaking elementary school children for many years and an English tutor for Laotian immigrants through Literacy Volunteers of America.

Pingree has served in many LDS Church callings, including ward Primary president, stake Relief Society president, and Relief Society general board member. She served with her husband, George C. Pingree, while he was president of the Nigeria Port Harcourt Mission from 1995 to 1998. In 2002, she was called as second counselor in the Relief Society General Presidency. Pingree's three addresses in the church's general Relief Society Meeting or general conference included Knowing the Lord's Will for You.

Pingree and her husband are the parents of five children.
