= Sheri L. Dew =

American author and publisher

Second Counselor in the Relief Society General Presidency
- April 5, 1997 – April 6, 2002
- Called by: Mary Ellen W. Smoot
- Predecessor: Aileen H. Clyde
- Successor: Anne C. Pingree

Personal details
- Born: November 21, 1953 (age 72); Ulysses, Kansas, United States
- Alma mater: Brigham Young University
- Parents: Charles and JoAnn P. Dew

Sheri Linn Dew (born November 21, 1953) is an American author, publisher, the executive vice president of Deseret Management Corporation, and chief executive officer of the Deseret Book Company, headquartered in Salt Lake City, Utah. Dew has also been a religious leader in the Church of Jesus Christ of Latter-day Saints (LDS Church) and an inspirational speaker. In 2003, she was described as "the most prominent single [unmarried] LDS woman right now."

Deseret Book Company owns two retail chains (Deseret Book and Seagull), two publishing companies (Deseret Book and Covenant), an events division (Time Out for Women), a digital division, a magazine (LDS Living) and a film-distribution company (Excel).

== Personal life ==
Dew was born November 21, 1953, in Ulysses, Kansas, to Charles and JoAnn Peterson Dew. The oldest of five children, she grew up on a "sprawling grain farm" and attended local schools. Of this time, she has said:

I drove a tractor almost as soon as I could reach the pedals. I know how to set an irrigation tube, and I helped with the harvest. . . . On the farm you learn early that you reap what you sow. . . . I am innately very shy, and I have struggled with that challenge for years. My work has helped because I've had to interview people from all walks of life.

Dew told interviewers in 2002 and 2004 that as a teenager she was 5 feet, 10 inches tall and was a standout in high school basketball, averaging 23 points and 17 rebounds a game. A Bloomberg Businessweek reporter wrote in 2012 that Dew had the "friendly, no-nonsense manner" of a high school basketball coach." Another writer noted in 2010 that Dew's "confident and collected demeanor always kept her on task."

She learned the piano and traveled on three USO tours to Alaska, Europe, the Mediterranean and Asia as an accompanist during her college years at Brigham Young University (BYU), where she earned a bachelor's degree in history, with an emphasis in American religious history.

Dew is close friends with Wendy Watson Nelson, and they presented together at the 2016 RootsTech conference.

== Career ==
=== Beginning ===
After graduating from BYU, Dew moved into the publishing business associated with the LDS Church, starting out as an assistant editor at Bookcraft beginning in 1978. She spent the next six years as an editor and associate publisher at This People magazine.

=== Deseret Book ===
Dew joined Deseret Book in 1988 as an associate editor and became director of publishing in 1989, vice president of publishing in 1993, and executive vice president in 2000. She was named the president and CEO of the company in March 2002, succeeding Ronald A. Millett. At the time Deseret Book consisted of a retail chain of some 40 stores and a publishing division. Bloomberg Businessweek reported in 2012 that Deseret Book was a "flailing" business when Dew took it over but that she "pulled the publisher and distributor out of the red 10 years ago."

In 2002 the company launched its Time Out for Women event series, and in 2004 it acquired Excel Entertainment, which brought Deseret Book into film distribution. Some of Excel's films include Saints and Soldiers, Forever Strong, The Work and the Glory, 17 Miracles and Saints and Soldiers: Airborne Creed.

In 2006, Deseret Book acquired the Seagull retail chain of twenty-six bookstores and Covenant Publishing, which publishes and distributes books, games, and gifts.

In June 2011, the company introduced Deseret Bookshelf, a free e-reader application for Apple and Android mobile devices, with nearly 1,500 digital titles for purchase. On a personal level, Dew noted that the Bookshelf app had "changed the way I research and study the gospel" because "I can always have my full library with me." The app allows the researcher to search all Deseret Book titles at one time as well as other associated Gospel references.

=== Broadcasting ===
Dew is a director of the Bonneville International Corporation, a broadcasting organization owned by the LDS Church.

== Public activities ==
=== Politics, government, and charity ===
Dew is a member of both the BYU Marriott School of Management's National Advisory Council and the President's Leadership Council for BYU-Hawaii. In March 2003, the White House appointed her a member of the U.S. Delegation to the Commission on the Status of Women and Girls at the United Nations.

After a 1999 trip to Ghana, Dew began to spearhead Chapters of Hope, a program to send children's books to impoverished areas of the world. Through 2011, nearly 50,000 books had been shipped to Ghana, the Pacific Islands, Russia, Eastern Europe, Zimbabwe and elsewhere by that organization.

Dew has said she has a greater liking for Republican political positions, particularly on social issues, explaining that "I am a Midwestern farmer's daughter," but that she has "many, many times" voted for Democrats. She has been asked to run for political office, but said she is so shy she "can't even ask for the full can of apple juice on the airplane" so she couldn't very well ask for votes.

Dew opened the 2004 Republican National Convention with a prayer after, she said, she had received a telephone request from "out of the blue and after she "had to ask myself if this would appear too partisan, and I decided it was never inappropriate to pray." She said she thought it "remarkable" that an LDS Church member was invited for the honor, "and even more so a woman."

=== LDS Church ===
Dew was a counselor to Mary Ellen W. Smoot in the general presidency of the women's Relief Society from 1997 to 2002, the first unmarried woman called to this position.

As an author, Dew was the authorized biographer for three church presidents: Ezra Taft Benson, Gordon B. Hinckley, and Russell M. Nelson.

Since 2009, Dew has contributed to the Mormon Channel's Conversations program, where she has interviewed some high-profile members of the LDS Church.

=== Cancer survivor ===
In 2006, Dew was diagnosed with breast cancer, revealed as "three tiny spots, almost invisible to the naked eye," and since 2010 she has been active in promoting awareness of the disease among Utah women. "I'm actually a poster child for early diagnosis," Dew said.

=== Same-sex marriage ===
Dew "drew criticism" resulting from remarks she made on February 28, 2004, at a Washington, D.C., meeting of the Family Action Council International, an interfaith group. According to Lee Davidson, a Deseret News reporter who was present, Dew quoted a statement by journalist Dorothy Thompson in 1941:

saying that before World War II would be over, every person would either stand for or against [German dictator Adolf] Hitler—and that trying not to make any choice was in fact making one, for Hitler.

Dew said in calm tones that the same is true in the fight for the traditional family, and everyone will support or fight it. "If we do not act in behalf of the family, that is itself an act of opposition to the family," she said.

Dew did add, "At first it may be extreme to imply a comparison between the atrocities of Hitler and what is happening in terms of contemporary threats against the family—but maybe not," and added she feels that breaking up the family will break up society.

The next month the Affirmation: Gay & Lesbian Mormons organization, which is not officially affiliated with the LDS Church, issued a statement expressing "outrage" at Dew's remarks, and in September of the same year the president of the Human Rights Campaign and the strategic director of the National Black Justice Coalition called on President George W. Bush to repudiate Dew's "deeply offensive comments about LGBT Americans."

In April 2005, Dew said that her point had nothing to do with Hitler. "I wasn't comparing anybody to Hitler," she said. "Hitler is irrelevant to the point I was trying to make."

"I have friends living an openly gay lifestyle with kids," she added. "In every instance, they are caring parents who love their kids and their kids love them. They know I feel it's not my prerogative to judge them. It's their right to choose. ... Those that deal with same-sex attraction have my respect."

== Awards ==
- 2009 Lifetime Achievement Award for "innovation and creativity" at Deseret Book

== Writings ==
She has authored several books, including the biographies of three LDS Church presidents (Benson, Hinckley, and Nelson). She also has written a biography of the 1985 Miss America, Sharlene Wells. All of Dew's works have been published in Salt Lake City by Deseret Book.

- Prophets See Around Corners, 2023
- Women and the Priesthood: What One Latter-Day Saint Woman Believes: Revised Edition, 2021
- Insights from a Prophet's Life: Russell M. Nelson, 2019
- Worth the Wrestle, 2017
- Amazed By Grace, 2015
- Women and the Priesthood: What One Mormon Woman Believes, 2013
- The Beginning of Better Days: Divine Instruction to Women From the Prophet Joseph Smith, 2012 (with Virginia H. Pearce)
- Are We Not All Mothers? 2009
- Saying It Like It Is, 2009
- God Wants a Powerful People, 2007
- If Life Were Easy, It Wouldn't Be Hard: And Other Reassuring Truths, 2005
- No One Can Take Your Place, 2004
- No Doubt About It, 2001
- Go Forward with Faith: The Biography of Gordon B. Hinckley, 1996
- Ezra Taft Benson: A Biography, 1987
- Sharlene Wells, Miss America, 1985

The Church of Jesus Christ of Latter-day Saints titles
Preceded by Aileen H. Clyde	Second Counselor in the Relief Society; General Presidency; April 5, 1997 – April 6, 2002	Succeeded by Anne C. Pingree
