= Bonnie D. Parkin =

American religious leader (1940–2025)

14th Relief Society General President
- April 6, 2002 – March 31, 2007
- Called by: Gordon B. Hinckley
- Predecessor: Mary Ellen W. Smoot
- Successor: Julie B. Beck

Second Counselor in Young Women General Presidency
- 1994 – 1997
- Called by: Janette C. Hales
- Predecessor: Patricia P. Pinegar
- Successor: Carol B. Thomas
- End reason: called as mission leaders

Personal details
- Born: Bonnie Dansie; August 4, 1940; Murray, Utah, U.S.
- Died: July 28, 2025 (aged 84)
- Residence: Salt Lake City, Utah, U.S.
- Alma mater: Utah State University
- Spouse(s): James L. Parkin (m. 1963)
- Children: 4

Bonnie Dansie Parkin (August 4, 1940 – July 28, 2025) was an American religious leader, teacher and speaker. She served as the fourteenth Relief Society General President of the Church of Jesus Christ of Latter-day Saints (LDS Church) from 2002 to 2007.

== Early life and education ==
Parkin was born in Murray, Utah, and grew up with four siblings in Herriman, Utah. In 1963, she married James L. Parkin. She earned a degree in elementary education and early childhood development from Utah State University (USU) in Logan, Utah. Parkin and her husband moved to Seattle, Washington as he finished his residency. The couple returned to Utah when he took a position in the division of otolaryngology at the University of Utah School of Medicine. She taught elementary school for three years. Parkin’s community service included work as PTA board president, docent for Utah Symphony, and page on Utah Senate floor. She was also a public speaker and at community and religious events. In 2008, she received USU's Giving Heart Award.

== LDS Church service ==
Parkin served in various capacities in the LDS Church, including stake Young Women president, ward Primary president, and ward Relief Society president. In September 1990, Parkin served as chairman of a transition committee which helped young women transition to membership in Relief Society. In 1994, she was called to serve as second counselor to Janette C. Hales in the Young Women General Presidency. She then served with her husband when he was president of the church's England London South Mission from 1997 to 2000. While in London, she suffered from an inner ear blood clot and lost hearing in one ear.

In 2002, Parkin was called as the church's Relief Society General President. Kathleen H. Hughes and Anne C. Pingree served as her counselors; both have professional backgrounds in education. Parkin’s twelve addresses in the church's general Relief Society Meeting or general conference included How Has Relief Society Blessed Your Life?, Fat-Free Feasting, and Gratitude: A Path to Happiness. Her address in the 2003 general Relief Society meeting warned against criticizing and gossiping. She also gave the keynote address at Brigham Young University's annual Women's Conference in the same year. In an open letter to the Federal Communications Commission, Parkin and the other members of the Relief Society, Young Women, and Primary presidencies asked for strict guidelines on children's television content, including asking that family relationships, schools, and religions not be ridiculed. Her speech at the 2006 general Relief Society meeting emphasized that feeling God's love would help comfort women in the church.

== Personal life and death ==
Parkin and her husband became the parents of four children and they lived in Utah. On July 28, 2025, Parkin died at the age of 84.
