= Chieko N. Okazaki =

American writer, educator, and religious leader (1926 – 2011)

First Counselor in the general presidency of the Relief Society
- March 31, 1990 – April 5, 1997
- Called by: Elaine L. Jack
- Predecessor: Joy F. Evans
- Successor: Virginia U. Jensen

Personal details
- Born: Chieko Nishimura; October 21, 1926; Hawaii, United States
- Died: August 1, 2011 (aged 84); Salt Lake City, Utah, United States
- Cause of death: Congestive heart failure
- Resting place: Mountain View Memorial Estates; 40.6113°N 111.8040°W
- Spouse(s): Edward Y. Okazaki
- Children: 2
- Parents: Kanenori and Hatsuko Nishimura

Chieko Nishimura Okazaki (October 21, 1926 – August 1, 2011) was an American writer, educator, and religious leader. She served as first counselor to Elaine L. Jack in the Relief Society general presidency of the Church of Jesus Christ of Latter-day Saints (LDS Church) from 1990 to 1997. She was the first person of color to serve in an LDS Church general organization presidency, as well as the first woman to serve in all three of the women-led organizations at a general church level: the general boards of the Young Women (1961-66) and Primary (1988-1990), along with the Relief Society.

Okazaki was born and raised in Hawaii as a Buddhist, the daughter of Hawaii-born parents of Japanese descent. As a child her mother, Hatsuko Nishimura, taught her the principle of kigatsuku—or doing what you know you should do without being told to do it. At the age of fifteen, after attending church meetings for some four years, she was baptized into the LDS Church. Professionally, she was an educator and taught in Hawaii, Utah, and Colorado, and was also an elementary school principal.

== Service in the LDS Church ==
Okazaki's general church service began in 1961 when she was appointed to the YWMIA board and was the first minority to serve on a general board. From 1968 to 1971, she served with her husband while he was the first president of the church's Japan Okinawa Mission and then the Japan Central Mission, based in Kobe, after the Japan Okinawa Mission was divided. In 1990, Okazaki was called to be the first counselor in the Relief Society general presidency. In that position, she became one of the first church leaders to address the topic of sexual abuse in a general meeting.

Okazaki's service in the church was markedly dedicated to fostering unity despite language and cultural barriers. She would characteristically greet audiences with a warm "aloha" at the beginning of her address. Further, Okazaki would strive to deliver sermons to local church members around the world in their own languages. Working with members of the church's translation department, she delivered speeches in the Spanish, Tongan, and Korean languages. Okazaki (2008: 10–13) notes in her book What a Friend We Have in Jesus that her audiences were very touched and gratified for her efforts to deliver sermons in their languages. Her efforts to speak in local languages was part and parcel of her general commitment to recognizing and celebrating diversity in the church.

Okazaki was a prolific writer and published many books including Lighten Up and Being Enough. She was a member of the Southern Virginia University board of trustees. She was a frequent speaker at the women's conference at Brigham Young University and other events sponsored by the church.

== Personal life ==
She met Edward Y. Okazaki while she was earning an undergraduate degree in education at the University of Hawaii (1948), and they married on June 18, 1949, ten months after which he was baptized. They eventually had two sons. Her husband served in the United States Army during World War II and was the first director of aging for the state of Utah. Okazaki earned a master's degree in education from the University of Northern Colorado (1977) and second degree in educational administration from Colorado State University (1978). Her education came at a great cost to her and her family, but she dedicated her life to paying that forward by teaching elementary school in Maui, Hawaii; Salt Lake City, Utah; and Littleton, Colorado.

Okazaki died of congestive heart failure in Salt Lake City, Utah, aged 84.

== Publications ==
- Okazaki, Chieko N. (November 1991), "Rejoice in Every Good Thing", Ensign
- — (1992), The Power of Charity, Shadow Mountain recording, ISBN 978-0-87579-644-4
- — (May 1992), "Spit and Mud and Kigatsuku", Ensign
- — (1993), Lighten Up!, Deseret Book, ISBN 978-0-87579-668-0
- — (May 1993), "Cat's Cradle of Kindness", Ensign
- — (1993), Healing from Sexual Abuse, Deseret Book recording, ISBN 978-0-87579-742-7
- — (1993), Valuing People: Six Lessons in Leadership, Deseret Book recording, ISBN 978-0-87579-749-6
- — (November 1993), "Strength in the Savior", Ensign
- — (1993), Christmas Presence, Deseret Book recording, ISBN 978-0-87579-808-0
- — (1994), Cat's Cradle, Bookcraft, ISBN 978-0-88494-904-6
- — (1994), Shared Motherhood, Bookcraft, ISBN 978-0-88494-932-9
- — (November 1994), "Rowing Your Boat", Ensign
- — (1995), Aloha!, Deseret Book, ISBN 978-0-87579-979-7
- — (November 1995), "A Living Network", Ensign
- — (May 1996), "Baskets and Bottles", Ensign
- — (November 1996), "Raised in Hope", Ensign
- — (1997), Sanctuary, Deseret Book, ISBN 978-1-57345-154-3
- — (1998), Disciples, Shadow Mountain, ISBN 978-1-57345-413-1
- — (2002), Being Enough, Bookcraft, ISBN 978-1-57008-876-6
- — (2004), Stars: Reflections on Christmas, Shadow Mountain, ISBN 978-1-59038-353-7
- — (2008), What a Friend We Have in Jesus, Deseret Book, ISBN 978-1-59038-855-6

The Church of Jesus Christ of Latter-day Saints titles
Preceded by Joy F. Evans	First Counselor in the general presidency of the Relief Society; March 31, 1990 – April 5, 1997	Succeeded by Virginia U. Jensen
