= Barbara W. Winder =

American religious and charity leader (1931–2017)

11th Relief Society General President
- April 7, 1984 – March 31, 1990
- Called by: Gordon B. Hinckley
- Predecessor: Barbara B. Smith
- Successor: Elaine L. Jack

Personal details
- Born: Barbara Ann Woodhead; May 9, 1931; East Millcreek, Utah, United States
- Died: June 25, 2017 (aged 86); South Jordan, Utah, United States
- Spouse(s): Richard W. Winder
- Children: 4: including Susan W. Tanner

Barbara Ann Woodhead Winder (May 9, 1931 – June 25, 2017) was the eleventh general president of the Relief Society of the Church of Jesus Christ of Latter-day Saints (LDS Church) from 1984 to 1990.

== Family and education ==
Barbara Woodhead was born on May 9, 1931, in Midvale, Utah to Willard Verl Woodhead and Marguerite Hand. She was the oldest of four children. She was raised in then rural East Millcreek, Utah, in the family's white frame house, where she weeded the garden, played in the orchard, and picked berries for her neighbors to earn money. Although her parents were not active in the LDS Church until Barbara was 25, they permitted her to attend church and be baptized.

Involved at school, she served as the student body secretary at Olympus Junior High School and the Girls League president at Granite High School. During high school, she worked at an ice-cream parlor and learned shorthand and typing. At a time when very few of her female classmates were planning to attend college, Barbara's girls' association advisor and father encouraged her to continue her education and plan for a career. "A college education was beyond my dreams," she said, and though lacking confidence that she could pay for it, she was accepted and began studying at the University of Utah.

She studied home economics while working part-time as a secretary. At the school, she was involved in Alpha Chi Omega, Lambda Delta Sigma, and LDS Institute. During her sophomore year, the family's milkman, Ned Winder, introduced Barbara to his brother, Richard W. Winder, who had recently returned home from an LDS mission. The couple's first date was a hay ride at the Winder family dairy, and two and a half weeks later, Barbara accepted Richard's proposal of marriage. They were married on January 10, 1951, in the Salt Lake Temple. They raised their four children on Winder Lane with nineteen cousins on the same block.

== LDS Church service ==
In 1982, Winder and her husband began their service as leaders of the California San Diego Mission. After just under two years in San Diego, Gordon B. Hinckley called Winder as the Relief Society General President. At the church's April 1984 General Conference, Winder was sustained as the Relief Society General President, with Joy F. Evans and Joanne B. Doxey as her counselors. Winder succeeded Barbara B. Smith, who had been Relief Society General President since 1974. Winder became president after a time of great division over the Equal Rights Amendment movement. As such, she stressed unity in her messages. "It is a time to heal," said Winder, "a time to bond women to women and women to men. We can have unity in diversity and diversity in unity. We don’t have to be like one another to enjoy sisterhood."

In April 1990, Winder was released and succeeded by Elaine L. Jack, as she and her husband had been called to lead the Czechoslovakia Prague Mission. They served in that assignment from 1990 to 1993. From 1993 to 1996, Winder served as assistant matron of the Jordan River Utah Temple. She then returned to the Czech Republic while her husband served as a patriarch. From 1999 to 2002, the Winders served a family and church history mission. From 2002 to 2004, the Winders served as the first president and matron of the rebuilt Nauvoo Illinois Temple.

Winder died at the age of 86 on June 25, 2017. due to complications from pulmonary fibrosis.

The Church of Jesus Christ of Latter-day Saints titles
Preceded by Barbara B. Smith	Relief Society General President; April 7, 1984 – March 31, 1990	Succeeded by Elaine L. Jack
