= Video-ready access device =

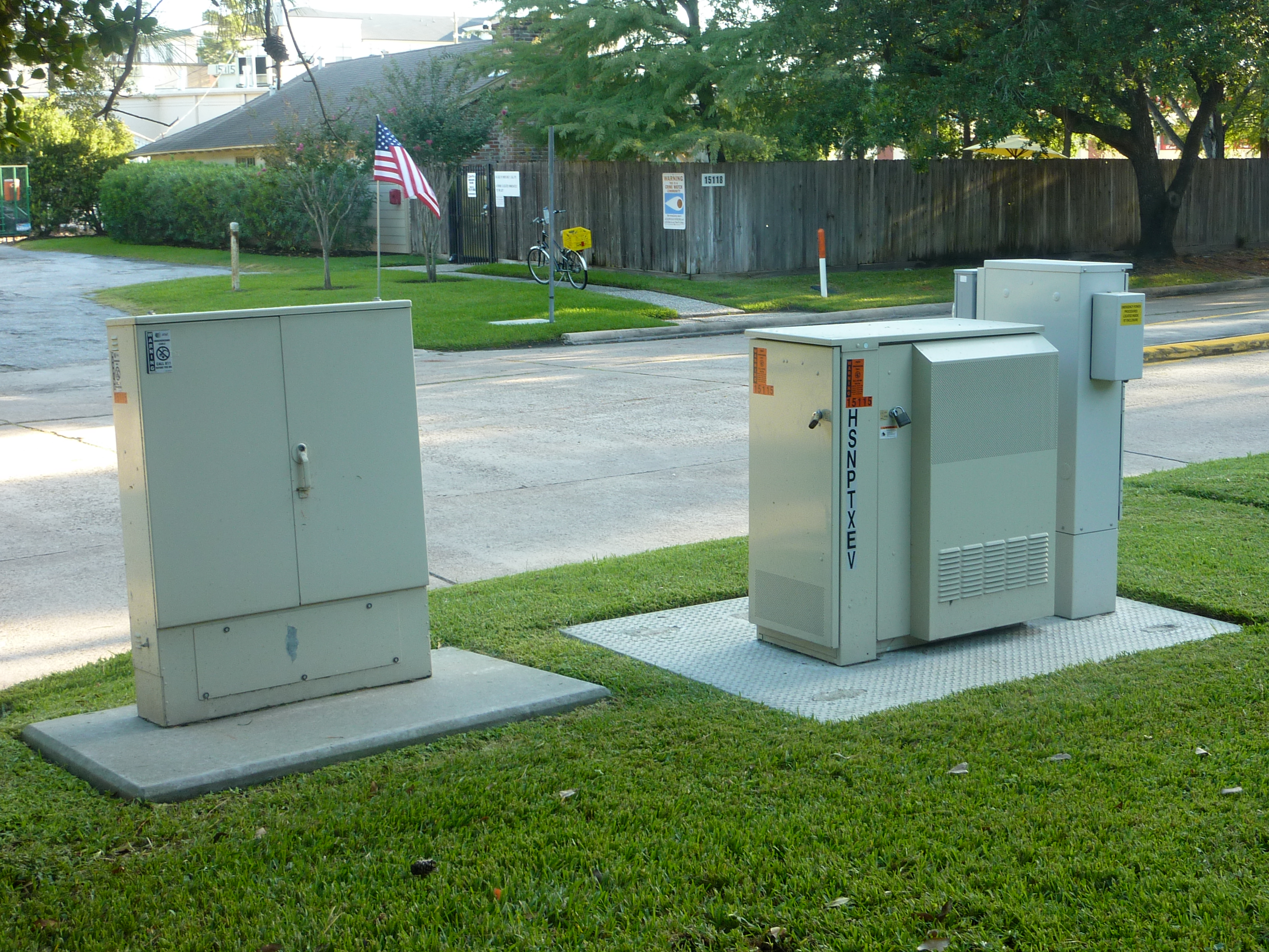
Cross-connect box (left) and VRAD (right) on a suburban street in Houston, Texas.

A video-ready access device (VRAD) provides digital subscriber line access and high-definition television programming to customers subscribed to IPTV services such as AT&T's U-verse, Bell Canada's Bell Fibe TV, Claro Puerto Rico's Claro TV, and Telus's Optik TV. VRAD equipment manufactured by Alcatel-Lucent can be configured to support between 48 and 864 lines per box. The VRAD boxes are composed of circuit boards providing service, fed by fiber-optic cable.

== AT&T VRADs ==
There are 2 types of VRAD systems currently used by AT&T: FTTN (fiber to the node), and FTTP (fiber to the premises).

FTTN, widely used where copper facilities exist in established neighborhoods, uses an Alcatel-Lucent 7330 Intelligent Services Access Manager (ISAM) shelf, which uses the existing copper wiring to customers' homes, leading to distance limitations from the VRAD cabinet to the customer's home. The 7330 ISAM is an internet protocol DSL access multiplexer that supports VDSL and ADSL protocols.

The FTTP system uses an Alcatel-Lucent 7340 ISAM shelf, which is mostly used in areas such as new neighborhoods or large-scale developments where fiber can be run to the household, removing the distance limitations of copper. The 7340 then connects to a Primary Flexibility Point, which distributes service to homes in the neighborhood, via a dual strand fiber, which is then split into 32 customer fiber pairs. In FTTP systems, the fiber pairs are typically led into a customer's residence at the network interface device. In FTTD (fiber to the desk) systems, the fiber can continue to an equipment room or garage, then to a decoder box or residential gateway, then to the customer's TV, computer, and phone lines.

The VRAD typically connects upstream to an Alcatel-Lucent 7450 Ethernet service switch in the central office hub, then to the headend video hub office.

VRADs required for U-verse are around 150 centimetres (59 in) wide, 122 centimetres (48 in) tall, and 66 centimetres (26 in) deep. Size and graffiti risk have drawn complaints from homeowners. AT&T has sued competitor Comcast for Chicago ads against AT&T's "large and unsightly" VRADs. Four VRADs have exploded due to faulty lithium-ion batteries manufactured by Avestor (now bankrupt), at least one explosion sending parts "fifty feet throughout the neighborhood." AT&T replaced all 17,000 Avestor batteries used in its VRADs with safer Alcatel-Lucent-designed SAFT NiCad batteries, which have a 10-year life.

== Other VRADs ==
Bell Canada's Bell Fibe TV and Telus's Optik TV also use VRADs in their networks. Bell Canada uses the Alcatel-Lucent 7330 and Ikanos Communications IKNS ISAMs, and provides Internet service via either FTTN to 50 Mbit/s, or FTTH (fibre to the home) to 1.5 Gbit/s.

Claro Puerto Rico is currently deploying VRADs to offer their IPTV and VDSL Internet service up to 50 Mbit/s. There are 2 types of VRAD systems currently used by Claro: FTTN (fiber to the node), and FTTP (fiber to the premises). It is unknown the equipment they are using.

== See also ==
- Multi-service access node
