= Multi-service access node =

A multi-service access node (MSAN), also known as a multi-service access gateway (MSAG), is a device typically installed in a telephone exchange (although sometimes in a roadside serving area interface cabinet) which connects customers' telephone lines to the core network, to provide telephone, ISDN, and broadband such as DSL all from a single platform.

Prior to the deployment of MSANs, telecom providers typically had a multitude of separate equipment including DSLAMs to provide the various types of services to customers. Integrating all services on a single node, which typically backhauls all data streams over IP or Asynchronous Transfer Mode can be more cost effective and may provide new services to customers more quickly than previously possible.

A typical outdoor MSAN cabinet consists of narrowband (POTS), broadband (xDSL) services, batteries with rectifiers, optical transmission unit and copper distribution frame.

== See also ==
- IMS
- Next-generation network
- Video-ready access device
