= T-2 (Internet service provider) =

Slovenian telecommunications company

T-2, d.o.o.
- Type: Public
- Industry: Mobile telecommunications, Internet
- Founded: 2004
- Headquarters: Maribor, Slovenia
- Key people: Vojko Šiler, Manager
- Products: Mobile networks, Telecom services, Internet, IPTV
- Website: www.t-2.net

T-2 is the second largest telecommunications provider in Slovenia. It was established on 11 May 2004.

T-2 offers VDSL, FTTH, VoIP, 3G and IPTV connectivity to individuals and businesses. T-2 operates its own network infrastructure in major cities in Slovenia. T-2 was the first Internet service provider to offer VDSL and over own FTTH network Triple play services in Slovenia. 3G access is being supplied by Nokia Siemens Networks.
