= Barbara B. Smith =

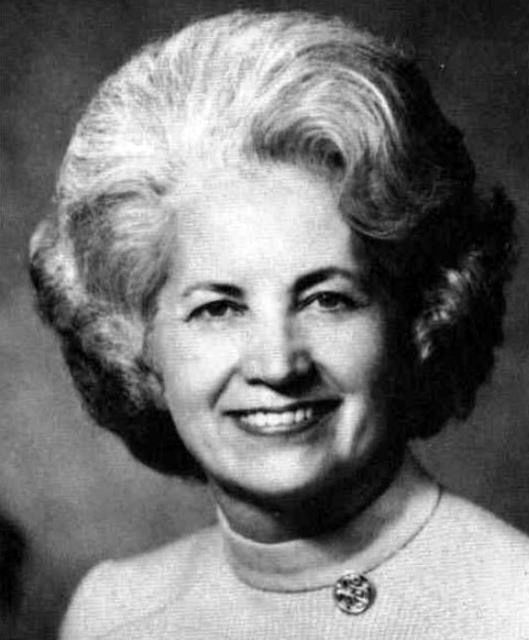

10th Relief Society General President
- October 3, 1974 – April 7, 1984
- Called by: Spencer W. Kimball
- Predecessor: Belle S. Spafford
- Successor: Barbara W. Winder
- End reason: Honorably released

Personal details
- Born: Barbara Bradshaw; January 26, 1922; Salt Lake City, Utah, United States
- Died: September 13, 2010 (aged 88); Salt Lake City, Utah, United States
- Resting place: Salt Lake City Cemetery; 40°46′37.92″N 111°51′28.8″W
- Spouse(s): Douglas H. Smith
- Children: 7
- Parents: Dorothy M. and Dan D. Bradshaw

Barbara Bradshaw Smith (January 26, 1922 – September 13, 2010) was the tenth general president of the Relief Society of the Church of Jesus Christ of Latter-day Saints (LDS Church) from 1974 to 1984. She was the first Relief Society General President to have been born in the 20th century.

Born on January 26, 1922, in Salt Lake City, Utah, Smith was the third of six children born to Dorothy Mills and Dan Delos Bradshaw. Smith graduated from South High School in 1940. She married Douglas H. Smith in the Salt Lake Temple on June 16, 1941. They were the parents of seven children.

In 1974, Smith succeeded Belle S. Spafford, who had been the Relief Society General President since 1945. Prior to her becoming Relief Society General President, Smith had served on a number of general boards at local and general church levels in the same organization.

As Relief Society General President, Smith spearheaded the LDS Church's opposition to the proposed Equal Rights Amendment to the U.S. Constitution. Smith also used her position to actively oppose the recruitment of women into the United States military and the spread of abortion, which had been legalized in the United States in 1973.

Smith was succeeded by Barbara W. Winder in April 1984.

Smith died on September 13, 2010, after suffering from pulmonary fibrosis for a number of years.

== See also ==
- Janath R. Cannon

== Notes ==
The Church of Jesus Christ of Latter-day Saints titles
Preceded by Belle S. Spafford	Relief Society General President; October 3, 1974–April 7, 1984	Succeeded by Barbara W. Winder
