= David F. Winder =

US Army soldier (1946-1970)

David Francis Winder
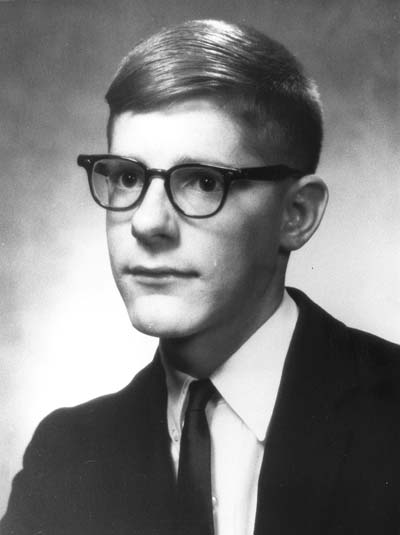
- Private First Class David Winder
- Born: August 10, 1946; Edinboro, Pennsylvania, US
- Died: May 13, 1970 (aged 23); Republic of Vietnam
- Burial place: Mansfield Memorial Park, Mansfield, Ohio
- Military career
- Allegiance: United States of America
- Branch: United States Army
- Service years: 1968–1970
- Rank: Private First Class
- Units: Headquarters and Headquarters Company, 3rd Battalion; 1st Infantry Regiment; 11th Infantry Brigade; Americal Division
- Conflicts: Vietnam War †
- Awards: Medal of Honor; Purple Heart

David Francis Winder (August 10, 1946 – May 13, 1970) was a United States Army soldier and a posthumous recipient of the United States military's highest decoration—the Medal of Honor—for his actions in the Vietnam War.

On May 13, 1970, Winder's unit was participating in a search and destroy exercise in the Republic of Vietnam. Suddenly, they were ambushed by a large North Vietnamese force, who caused severe casualties among the Americans. Winder crawled to injured men and helped them, but was mortally wounded during one of these actions. He was awarded the Medal of Honor in 1971 for his valor.

== Biography ==
Winder was born in Edinboro, Pennsylvania, one of four children born to Frances Gertrude (née Eppinger) and Dr James Calvin Winder.

He attended Kemper Military School & College in Boonville, Missouri. Winder joined the Army from Columbus, Ohio in 1968, and by May 13, 1970, was a Private First Class serving as a combat medic in the Headquarters and Headquarters Company of the 3d Battalion, 1st Infantry Regiment, 11th Infantry Brigade, Americal Division. On that day, in the Republic of Vietnam, Winder attempted to reach several wounded comrades through intense enemy fire, and was mortally wounded in the process.

Winder, aged 23 at his death, was buried in Mansfield Memorial Park, Mansfield, Ohio.

PFC Winder is the namesake of the Winder Troop Medical Clinic, located at Sand Hill at Fort Benning, Georgia.

== Medal of Honor citation ==
Private First Class Winder's official Medal of Honor citation reads:

Pfc. Winder distinguished himself while serving in the Republic of Vietnam as a senior medical aidman with Company A. After moving through freshly cut rice paddies in search of a suspected company-size enemy force, the unit started a thorough search of the area. Suddenly they were engaged with intense automatic weapons and rocket propelled grenade fire by a well entrenched enemy force. Several friendly soldiers fell wounded in the initial contact and the unit was pinned down. Responding instantly to the cries of his wounded comrades, Pfc. Winder began maneuvering across approximately 100 meters of open, bullet-swept terrain toward the nearest casualty. Unarmed and crawling most of the distance, he was wounded by enemy fire before reaching his comrades. Despite his wounds and with great effort, Pfc. Winder reached the first casualty and administered medical aid. As he continued to crawl across the open terrain toward a second wounded soldier he was forced to stop when wounded a second time. Aroused by the cries of an injured comrade for aid, Pfc. Winder's great determination and sense of duty impelled him to move forward once again, despite his wounds, in a courageous attempt to reach and assist the injured man. After struggling to within 10 meters of the man, Pfc. Winder was mortally wounded. His dedication and sacrifice inspired his unit to initiate an aggressive counterassault which led to the defeat of the enemy. Pfc. Winder's conspicuous gallantry and intrepidity in action at the cost of his life were in keeping with the highest traditions of the military service and reflect great credit on him, his unit and the U.S. Army.

== See also ==
- List of Medal of Honor recipients for the Vietnam War
