= Richard W. Winder =

Richard W. Winder (November 24, 1924 – May 11, 2015) was a mid-level leader in the Church of Jesus Christ of Latter-day Saints (LDS Church) for much of the last few decades prior to his death.

Born in Salt Lake City, Utah, Winder served as an LDS Church missionary in Czechoslovakia from 1948 to 1950.

Winder married Barbara W. Winder, who later served as general president of the LDS Church's Relief Society. They made their living by running Winder Dairy.

In the LDS Church, Winder served as a bishop, stake president and regional representative. Winder also served as president of the church's California San Diego Mission and as a counselor in the presidency of the Jordan River Utah Temple.

In 1990, when the church's Czechoslovakia Mission was reorganized after the fall of communism, Winder was appointed as the president of that mission. He was serving in this capacity when Czechoslovakia split into the Czech Republic and Slovakia in 1993. Winder served as president of the mission over the two countries until July 1993.

From 1999 to 2002, Winder served as president of the Family and Church History Mission, which included missionaries in the Family History Library and the Church History Library and Archives.

Winder served as the first president of the rebuilt Nauvoo Illinois Temple from 2002 to 2004.
