= Belle S. Spafford =

American Mormon leader

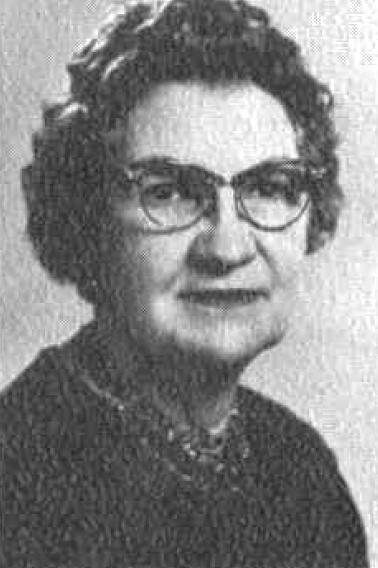

9th Relief Society General President
- April 6, 1945 – October 3, 1974
- Called by: Heber J. Grant
- Predecessor: Amy Brown Lyman
- Successor: Barbara B. Smith
- End reason: Honorable released

Second Counselor in the Relief Society General Presidency
- 1942 – 1945
- Called by: Amy Brown Lyman
- Predecessor: Donna D. Sorensen
- Successor: Gertrude R. Garff

Personal details
- Born: Marion Isabelle Sims Smith; October 8, 1895; Salt Lake City, Utah Territory, United States
- Died: February 2, 1982 (aged 86); Salt Lake City, Utah, United States
- Resting place: Redwood Memorial Cemetery; 40°37′57″N 111°56′21.84″W
- Spouse(s): W. Earl Spafford
- Children: 2
- Parents: John Gibson Smith; Hester Sims

Marion Isabelle Sims Spafford (née Smith; October 8, 1895 – February 2, 1982), known as Belle S. Spafford, was the ninth Relief Society General President of the Church of Jesus Christ of Latter-day Saints (LDS Church) from April 6, 1945, until October 3, 1974. She served longer in this capacity than any other woman in the history of the Relief Society. Spafford also served as president of the National Council of Women from 1968 to 1972, traveling and speaking both nationally and internationally in that position.

She served the LDS Church in a variety of other positions and capacities, including as editor of the Relief Society Magazine, founder of the church's social services program, and board of trustees member of the LDS school system. In all of her activities, Spafford consistently spoke of the rights and responsibilities of women.

== Biography ==
=== Early life ===
Born on October 8, 1895, in Salt Lake City, Utah Territory, to John Gibson Smith and Hester (Sims) Smith, Marion Isabelle Sims Smith was the youngest of seven children. Little is known about her childhood, other than her father died before her birth. She attended the Latter-day Saints University and Normal School at the University of Utah. Spafford went on to teach in Salt Lake City schools.

In 1921, she married W. Earl Spafford, whom she met at Brigham Young University (BYU). They had two children, Earl and Mary, and nine grandchildren.

Prior to serving as Relief Society general president, Spafford served on several stake Relief Society boards. She was then appointed to the General Relief Society board and named editor of the Relief Society Magazine, a position she held for eight years. In 1942, Spafford was called as second counselor to Relief Society president Amy B. Lyman, replacing Donna D. Sorensen. She served as second counselor until 1945, when she was appointed Relief Society general president.

=== General Relief Society Presidency ===
Spafford served under six LDS Church presidents, from Heber J. Grant to Spencer W. Kimball. During her tenure as Relief Society general president, the organization grew from just over 100,000 members to more than one million, spanning several dozen countries. Spafford oversaw the discontinuance of the Relief Society Magazine in 1970 and promoted the Ensign as the primary magazine for the church's women. Spafford also oversaw the construction of the world headquarters building for the Relief Society.

Spafford was one of the founders of the church's social services program, known today as Family Services. She was also instrumental in organizing the women's musical group the Singing Mothers. Although many wards had their own chorus of women called Singing Mothers since the 1930s, Spafford founded a large chorus from the groups in 1940. The musical group grew to a 300-member chorus that, under the direction of Spafford, performed at the New York World's Fair and toured the United States and Great Britain.

In 1974, after nearly 30 years of service, President Spencer W. Kimball announced the release of Belle Spafford as General Relief Society president.

=== National Council of Women Presidency ===
Spafford was a member of the National Council of Women of the United States, holding various positions during her 42-year membership. She served on the board for several years and was unanimously elected president of the organization in 1968. Spafford served for two years as president until 1970, and was the first appointed Mormon Council president. She was also a member of the American Regional Council of the International Council of Women. In the late 1970s, Spafford was a vocal opponent of the proposed Equal Rights Amendment (ERA).

As Relief Society general president and president of the National Council of Women, Spafford spoke at innumerable gatherings, meetings, and forums, including BYU's Education Week. Serving in these positions, she became a notable national and international speaker, speaking as close to home as Idaho and as far away as Paris and Vienna.

=== 1970s Women's Rights Movements ===
Although she believed that rearing the family was a shared responsibility between men and women, Spafford was cautious in both her words and actions to not fully support or endorse the women's rights movements of the 1970s. In 1972, she stated, "Anything that gets out of control becomes a hazard, whether it's fire, flood, or women's lib". She went on to say that "we want to preserve the nobility, dignity, and femininity of women; there's a danger of some of that being lost. But I think we have too many common-sense women for that to happen."

Spafford supported many of the movement's causes such as equal pay for equal work and non-discrimination in hiring practices when both individuals were equally qualified. She was not a supporter of the ERA, but rather believed that the same results could be achieved through work at the local and state levels.

=== Other notable service positions ===
Despite being heavily involved with both the Relief Society and the National Council of Women, Spafford remained focused on special education and social work. Spafford served as a member of the National Advisory Committee to the White House Conference on Aging. She was the vice president of the American Mothers Committee and Advisory Board. Spafford was the first female member of the board of governors of the LDS Hospital in Salt Lake City. She also served as a member and an officer of the board of directors of National Association for Practical Nurses.

At BYU, she worked for children with disabilities as a special education instructor of remedial work. In 1968, Spafford was appointed to the board of trustees of the LDS Church's school system, becoming the first woman on the board. She continued in these efforts until retiring shortly before her death on February 2, 1982.

== Legacy ==
Spafford was released as Relief Society General President in 1974 after serving for almost 30 years in that position, the longest term of service in the church's history for a Relief Society president. She was succeeded by Barbara B. Smith.

Spafford received the BYU Distinguished Service award in 1951, and was granted an honorary doctor of humanities degree in 1956. She was also honored by the University of Utah Alumni Association in 1967 and received an honorary doctor's degree from the university as well. Spafford was named "Woman of the Year" by BYU in 1970, and at the presentation ceremony was honored by BYU president Ernest L. Wilkinson for her "many services to the university, her state, her church and nation". She was honored by the university again in 1973 with the BYU Emeritus Club Award.

In 1979, Spafford retired from the National Council of Women. The NCW announced October 23, 1979 as "Belle S. Spafford Day" in her honor. The council also created a fellowship with New York University that became known as the Belle S. Spafford Archival Research Program Fund at the New York Public Library. In 1988, the council posthumously awarded Spafford for establishing the American Regional Council of the International Council of Women.

The Utah State Conference of Social Work acknowledged Spafford's accomplishments in social services by honoring her with a lifelong membership. Spafford received the Pursuit of Excellence Award from the LDS Student Association as well as the Distinguished Service Award for the Crusade of Freedom. In 1982, the University of Utah established the Belle S. Spafford Endowed Chair in Social Work in her honor. Spafford had worked as a special lecturer at the University of Utah. In addition, Belle Spafford was named to the Salt Lake Council Women's Hall of Fame.

Spafford authored two books and co-authored one other: A Centenary of Relief Society, Women in Today's World, and A Woman's Reach. Spafford co-authored A Centenary of Relief Society as part of the Relief Society General Board. Women in Today's World was published in 1971, and A Woman's Reach was published in 1975.

The Church of Jesus Christ of Latter-day Saints titles
Preceded by Amy B. Lyman	Relief Society General President; April 6, 1945 – October 3, 1974	Succeeded by Barbara B. Smith
Preceded by Donna D. Sorensen	Second Counselor in the Relief Society General Presidency; 1942 – April 6, 1945	Succeeded by Gertrude R. Garff
Relief Society Magazine titles
Preceded by Mary Connelly Kimball	Editor; 1937–1945	Succeeded by Marianne C. Sharp
