= Digital Region =

Internet infrastructure initiative in South Yorkshire, England

- Commercial?: Yes
- Type of project: Next-generation high-speed broadband network
- Products: 'Superfast Broadband'
- Location: South Yorkshire region, England, UK
- Owner: originally: Yorkshire Forward subsequently: Department for Business, Innovation & Skills
- Established: April 2009; 15 years ago
- Disestablished: 15 August 2014; 10 years ago
- Funding: Grants, loans
- Status: defunct
- Website: www.digitalregion.co.uk

Digital Region, also stylised digital region, was a project in South Yorkshire set up to establish a high-speed next-generation 'Superfast Broadband' network in the specific region of northern England, first seeded in 2006; 19 years ago, with 97% population coverage expected by the end of 2012. It was the first of its kind in the United Kingdom (UK). The project was co-ordinated by Digital Region Limited (DRL), owned by the Department for Business, Innovation & Skills (BIS) (having taken over the role from the now defunct Yorkshire Forward), and the four local authorities that encompass South Yorkshire; these being Sheffield City Council, Barnsley Metropolitan Borough Council, Doncaster Metropolitan Borough Council, and Rotherham Metropolitan Borough Council. Thales Transport and Security was chosen to design, build and operate the project on behalf of Digital Region Limited (who will manage the project), registered in England no: 5586340, registered office: Electric Works, Sheffield Digital Campus, Sheffield, S1 2BJ.

On 15 August 2013, it was announced that the project would close, due to the ongoing financial issues it has been facing.

== Funding ==
The hope of the project was that it would eventually become self-financing, however loans and grants of over £90 million were used to enable the project to start. The project received:

- £44 million grant funding from Yorkshire Forward and the European Regional Development Fund (ERDF);
- £40 million loan funding from Yorkshire Forward and the four local authorities;
- £10 million loan funding from the project technology partner, Thales Transport and Security.

Due to low take-up, the project suffered a very significant operating loss; not even taking into account the substantial interest payments due on loans for capital construction.

== Coverage ==
The project area covered the city, towns and villages of Sheffield, Barnsley, Doncaster, and Rotherham. It was expected to serve around 1.3 million people, 546,000 homes, and 40,000 businesses.

== Closure ==
Whilst the build of the project was substantially completed, it had a low take-up. None of the six major consumer ISPs were signed up to resell services on the network, and after a number of significant startups on the Digital Region network enjoyed success with Superfast Fibre in South Yorkshire, the incumbent telephone operator British Telecom (BT), deployed its own fibre-based broadband services, attracting many more users due to an existing user base upgrading, and the wide variety of ISPs available (PlusNet, Sky, TalkTalk, and BT).

The Digital Region network closed finally on 15 August 2014, with many of its resellers closing at that point. Origin Broadband acquired many of the customers who were on the Digital Region network, and succeeded the defunct network with their own bespoke ADSL2+ network, while other ISPs went on to be resellers for other network operators.
