= TurkNet =

Turkish telecommunications company

TurkNet İletişim Hizmetleri A.Ş.
- Type: Private
- Industry: Telecommunication
- Founded: 1996
- Headquarters: Istanbul, Turkey
- Website: https://www.turk.net

TurkNet or by its legal name TurkNet İletişim Hizmetleri A.Ş. is a telecommunications company that offers internet access and telephone services to businesses and consumers in Turkey. As of the end of September 2015, TurkNet was the fourth-largest internet service provider(ISP) in Turkey with 2.1% share of the internet service provider market, and 3.7% of the fixed-line telephone services market. As of September 2026, Turknet was again the fourth-largest ISP, with 6.92% of the market.

In 2007, TurkNet received a $12.5 million investment from Novator, a private equity fund controlled by Björgólfur Thor Björgólfsson and in May 2013, TurkNet received a loan worth EUR 9.5 million from the EBRD for a capital expansion program. Subsequent growth brought the company a retail base of 180,000 retail customers and 25,000 business customers.

Founded as Netone in 1996, the company purchased the TurkNet brand and assets from Sabancı Holding in February 2008. Sabancı Holding had previously purchased Turk.Net from its founders in 1999.

TurkNet has established its own devices with LLU (Local Loop Unbundling) into Turk Telekom stations, which provides significant saving in wholesale data costs. Thanks to this saving, in April 2017 TurkNet removed Fair Usage Quota (FUQ) from all customers in TurkNet's active infrastructure. In September 2017, TurkNet became the first operator to remove Fair Usage Quota for all its customers. TurkNet currently has LLU investments in more than 26 cities and in over 200 Turk Telekom stations.

As of Dec 2019, Turknet had more than 350K residential customers, 25K SME customers and more than 2,500 enterprise customers.
