= Ripwire =

Defunct British telecommunications company

Ripwire Ltd
- Type: Private limited company
- Industry: Telecommunications
- Founded: 2008
- Headquarters: Rotherham, England, UK
- Key people: Liam Winder MD, Quentin Birchall CCO
- Products: Broadband services
- Website: ripwire.co.uk (archived)

Ripwire is a British company that sells Internet and telecommunications services, including hosting, broadband Internet connections, VOIP and interactive multi-touch software applications.

== History ==
The company traces its history back to October 2008, when founder Liam Winder signed agreements with 'Freedom4 Communications plc to use their 3.6 GHz, 4Ghz and 28 GHz licensed WiMAX spectrum in various cities in the UK.

Since this time, Ripwire has gone on to roll out wireless access across the UK including the Rhondda Cynon Taff valleys in South Wales.

In April 2010, Ripwire announced availability of a VDSL2 service in South Yorkshire that brings 40Mb internet for homes and businesses across the Digital Region network.

As of February 2012, Ripwire have gone into administration after being acquired by Ask4.
