= David Winder (artist) =

English painter

David Winder (1824–16 April 1912) was a British portrait painter from Lancashire, England.

== Biography ==
David Winder was the son of John Winder, manager of a textile mill in Bolton, Lancashire. He gained a reputation as the painter of several portraits of Bolton dignitaries, including several mayors. One of his earliest existing paintings is his portrait of the former Mayor of Bolton, Charles James Darbishire, painted in oil. He also painted landscapes and exhibited at the Royal Institute in Manchester. He lived all his life in Bolton and was buried in Heaton Cemetery, Bolton. He had married Sarah Green: both their son David Horatio and their daughter became accomplished artists.

Winder has nine oil paintings in UK public art collections. His portrait of James Ashworth (1815-1889) is held by Gallery Oldham, while the remainder are in the collection of Bolton Museum, Lancashire.
