= Honeydon =

Hamlet in Bedfordshire, England

Coordinates: 52.21528°N 0.3368°W

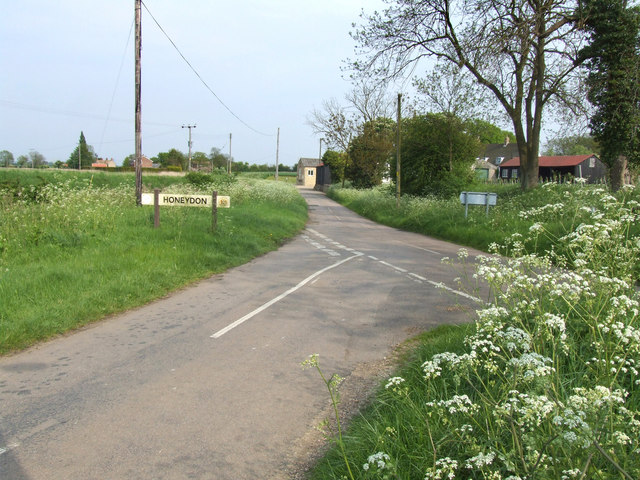

- Location within Bedfordshire
- OS grid reference: TL137587
- Civil parish: Staploe
- Unitary authority: Bedford
- Ceremonial county: Bedfordshire
- Region: East
- Country: England
- Sovereign state: United Kingdom
- Post town: BEDFORD
- Postcode district: MK44
- Dialling code: 01234
- Police: Bedfordshire
- Fire: Bedfordshire
- Ambulance: East of England
- UK Parliament: North Bedfordshire

Honeydon is a hamlet located in the Borough of Bedford in Bedfordshire, England.

Honeydon lies in the civil parish of Staploe (where the 2011 Census population was included), and is close to Upper Staploe and Begwary. The settlement is also close to the border of Cambridgeshire.

== Famous residents ==
- Joseph Fielding, early leader of the Latter Day Saint movement, born in Honeydon in 1797
- Mary Fielding Smith, wife of Hyrum Smith and mother of Joseph F. Smith, early leaders of the Latter Day Saint movement, born in Honeydon in 1801
