= Duloe =

Duloe may refer to:

- Duloe, Bedfordshire, England
- Duloe, Cornwall, England
