= Joseph Fielding =

Mormon pioneer

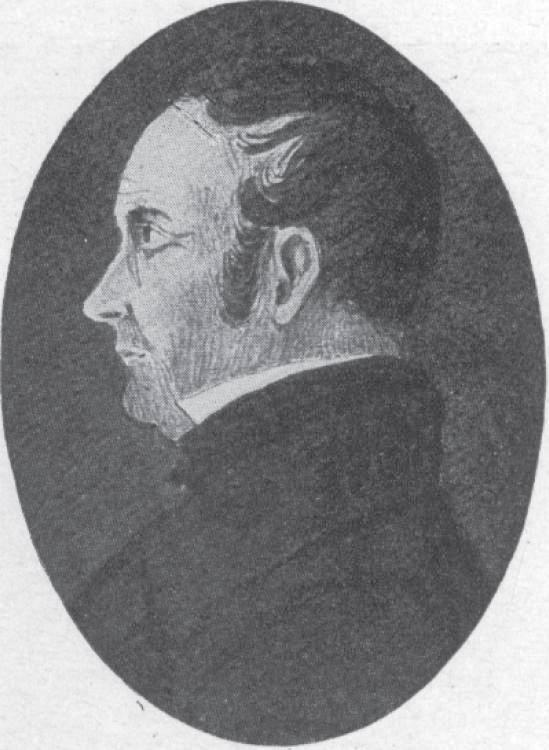

Personal details
- Born: March 26, 1797; Honeydon, Bedfordshire, England
- Died: December 19, 1863 (aged 66); Salt Lake City, Utah, United States
- Resting place: Salt Lake City Cemetery; 40.777°N 111.858°W

Joseph Fielding (March 26, 1797 – December 19, 1863) was an early leader of the Latter Day Saint movement. He served as the second president of the British Mission (1838–1840), coordinating the activities of missionaries in sections of the United Kingdom and parts of Europe. He was the brother of Mary Fielding, the second wife of Hyrum Smith, and an uncle of Joseph F. Smith, the sixth president of the Church of Jesus Christ of Latter-day Saints (LDS Church).

== Family history ==
Fielding was born in Honeydon, Bedfordshire, England, to John Fielding and Rachel Ibbotson, who braved the scorn and persecution of the established church to become members of the Square Chapel Independent congregation, led by the famous minister Titus Knight, in their hometown of Halifax, Yorkshire. James was christened there on 5 May 1793. The family then moved to Honidon, Bedfordshire, where the Fielding family were active in the growing Methodist movement in the area. For many years they regularly walked the four miles to attend the Methodist chapel at St Neots. It is significant that of the ten children, at least eight were to spend their lives closely involved with the evangelism of the gospel, albeit within differing religions.

James preached in first the Methodist Church, but became disaffected and, at the instigation of his brother-in-law, Timothy Matthews (a priest), went to Preston, accompanied by two of his sisters, Martha and Mary, to preach in the Semi-Episcopalian and Primitive Episcopalian churches. Martha Ibbotson Fielding married Peter Isaac Watson (a minister) in Preston in 1836. Thomas Fielding served the ministry in the Church of England, initially at Papworth under the rector, Harvey James Sperling.

In 1832, Joseph Fielding emigrated to Canada with his sister, Mercy Rachel. The siblings established a farm in Charleton, nine miles northwest of York, Upper Canada. They were joined a short time later by his younger sister, Mary. Between 1834 and 1836, Fielding and his sisters participated in a religious study group in Toronto. Other members included John and Leonora Taylor, who later also became prominent in the Latter Day Saint faith. The group discussed problems and concerns with their Methodist faith, and quickly became known as the "Dissenters."

Fielding was baptized into the Church of the Latter Day Saints on May 21, 1836 by Parley P. Pratt. He was ordained a teacher in the summer of 1836 and a priest in May 1837. He then moved his family to Kirtland, Ohio to join the general body of the church in May 1837. His sister, Mercy, born 15 June 1807, married fellow Latter Day Saint Robert Blashel Thompson, who served as a missionary to Canada and later became associate editor of Times and Seasons. He died of consumption in 1841. In 1837, Mary Fielding met and married widower Hyrum Smith, patriarch of the Church of Jesus Christ of Latter Day Saints, and brother to the movement's founder, Joseph Smith. She became stepmother to his six children by his first wife and on 13 November 1838 bore him a son, Joseph F. Smith, and later a daughter, Martha Ann. Joseph F. Smith would serve as counselor to four LDS Church presidents before becoming the sixth president in 1901, at the age of 62. His own child, Hyrum and Mary’s grandson, Joseph Fielding Smith, became the 10th church president in 1970, at the age of 93. Another grandson, Hyrum Mack Smith, was ordained an apostle in 1901 and his grandson, M. Russell Ballard, called as an apostle in 1985, and served as Acting President of the Quorum of the Twelve Apostles from January 2018 until his death in November 2023.

== Mission to England ==
Between 1837 and 1840, Fielding was called to serve as part of the first Latter Day Saint mission to England. In June, he accompanied apostles Heber C. Kimball and Orson Hyde, along with four other missionaries on board 'The Garrick', across the Atlantic from New York to Liverpool, where they landed on 19 July 1837. Fielding was ordained both an elder and a high priest while in England. He later served as President of the British Mission, when the remaining missionaries other than Willard Richards returned to America in April 1838.

The importance of the Fieldings in the growth of the Latter Day Saints in England lay not just in the diligent missionary service of Joseph Fielding. The early success of this first mission was due largely to the willingness of Joseph's brother, James Fielding, to open his pulpit to the missionaries. Missionary work also began in Bedfordshire because of the Fielding family connection. In August 1837, Richards and Goodson travelled to Bedford and their first action on arriving in Bedford was to contact Matthews, who invited them to preach in his chapel. Later missionary efforts also took advantage of Fielding family connections. During the second apostolic mission of 1840, when John Taylor and Joseph Fielding took the gospel to Liverpool in January 1840, it was yet again the Fielding family connection which opened the door. Matthews had established a congregation on Hope Street, Liverpool, adapting principles of the Latter Day Saint gospel to suit his own purposes. Although they were refused permission to preach in the Hope Street chapel, it was there that they found their first convert. Joseph Fielding had high hopes that his brother and other members of his family remaining in England would join the Church and spent much of the voyage praying to that end. However, he was to be sadly disappointed.

The decision of the missionaries to go first to Preston, Lancashire, was because Joseph and his friend John Taylor had written about this new, restored gospel to James Fielding. James had read those letters to his congregation at the Vauxhall Road Chapel, but kept back the parts that talked about baptism, as his non-conformist congregation, known in Preston as Semi-episcopalians, did not practice baptism. He was aware that the missionaries were coming to England and eagerly awaited their arrival in Preston. According to Joseph his brother had, "raised their expectations very high." In this way, James laid much of the ground work for the conversion of his members to the Mormon faith when they were invited by him to preach in his chapel, which they did for the first time on Sunday 23 July 1837, speaking at two services and again during the week. When the missionaries preached, many came forward desiring to be baptised. Learning of the proposed baptisms, and foreseeing correctly that he was going to lose his flock, James visited Apostle Heber C. Kimball, the mission leader, the night before, forbidding him from doing so. Elder Kimball simply replied that God was no respecter of persons and he would proceed with the baptisms.. Those first baptisms east of the Atlantic took place the following Sunday, 30 July 1837, in the River Ribble near the Old Tram Bridge, in what is now Avenham Park, Preston. The nine baptised were all from James Fielding's congregation.

His brother did not take kindly to losing his flock, most of whom would join the Church, despite a late attempt to have Robert Aitken (an English priest and preacher) offer baptism to his congregation. By 21 September 1837, Heber C. Kimball was able to note of James Fielding that, "His church has left him and he is an object of pity." James was made something of a laughing stock in Preston, and referred to his brother as a 'sheep stealer.'; James later published pamphlets attacking the Church. But more lay behind his bitterness than just the loss of his congregation. At the date of the missionaries' arrival James was doing so well that his congregation had outgrown the 500 seat Vauxhall Chapel, and he had contracted to build a new, larger chapel a few streets away on Avenham Lane, which opened in January 1838 as the Primitive Episcopalian Church. It had cost £1,500 to build and the builders and contractors were pressing for payment of their bills. Without much of a congregation and therefore unable to meet the demands, James was compelled to sell the building. Ever anxious to eliminate 'dissenting' congregations, and in genuine need of more Church of England places of worship to accommodate Preston's growing population, Roger Carus Wilson, Vicar of Preston, bought the newly built chapel in April 1838 at the much reduced price of £1,000. The whole affair was of considerable embarrassment to James. By the beginning of January 1838, he became seriously ill. Many in Preston blamed Joseph, saying that he had broken his brother's heart by stealing his congregation. James eventually recovered his health but not his congregation. Joseph Fielding recorded that his brother finally left his church in March 1839. However, according to his own statement, James continued to preach elsewhere in the Preston area for a further 13 years.

Joseph was described as a good and kindly man, anxious to serve the Lord faithfully, but he felt less worthy and successful than some of his missionary companions, particularly Elders Hyde and Kimball, and struggled with his own missionary service. He was saddened by his brother's eventual rejection of the Latter-day Saint gospel and confided to his diary that he felt, "rather lonely." His missionary companions Heber C Kimball and Orson Hyde were busy with their individual evangelism; both were experiencing great success but each tended to work alone. For often weeks at a time Joseph Fielding was left very much to his own labours in Preston. Elder Kimball, perhaps in keeping with his frontier background, felt more comfortable in spending most of his time in the country areas outside of Preston. Joseph greatly admired Elders Kimball and Hyde and felt highly favoured in having their companionship. Hyde, an eloquent speaker, he saw as very faithful and diligent, with great power in preaching; so much so that other preachers did not dare come against him. He was said to be making Methodist preachers scarce, having baptised some thirteen of them. Joseph wrote in his diary that Hyde's preaching was "very engaging and has attracted many hearers." To Joseph, Elder Kimball was a spiritual giant: "I like brother K's company, but he is so far before me that it casts me down, and I have grieved the Spirit of God by murmuring when I ought to have rejoiced and been thankful." Kimball and Hyde, it seemed to Joseph, worked in perfect unison, being on the same spiritual plane.

Despite the rapid growth in converts, Joseph Fielding was frequently disappointed with his own performance and sense of weakness. He felt that the Lord would never make much of him, yet was determined to keep him humble. At other times, however, his diligent service resulted in feelings that he was blessed with both an increase in faith and an enlargement of the mind, "it is evident that I am most pleasing to the Lord when I am most engaged in the work," he confided to his diary. Sometimes, Joseph Fielding found himself unfavourably compared to Heber C Kimball. On a fortnight's preaching in the country in mid-October 1837, he observed that "as I was following Elder Kimball, people would rather have seen him, yet they were mostly kind." Still struggling with his personal trials in January 1838, Joseph wrote that he had laboured much, "but I seemed as nothing in my own eyes and but little in some of the people's eyes. One, not a brother, said if they had had Mr Kimball before they would have had a better congregation and more members.".

By April 1838, over 1,600 had been baptized, and organized into more than twenty branches throughout the country.

Between 1838 and 1840, Fielding was left in charge of the mission when Kimball and Hyde returned to America in the spring of 1838. He acted as Mission President for the church, with Willard Richards as his first counselor and recent British convert William Clayton as his second counselor. Fielding married a newly baptized church member, Hannah Greenwood, on June 11, 1838. Willard Richards was a witness to his marriage and Joseph was a witness to Willard's marriage to Jenetta Richards. Joseph and Hannah had six children, two of them born in Preston: Rachel on 27 June 1839, and Ellen on 9 February 1841.

Fielding was released as mission president when Brigham Young and other apostles arrived in England in 1840, but continued to serve as a missionary until September 1841. He and his wife and their two children left Liverpool for the United States on 21 September 1841, on board the 'Tyrian', bound for Nauvoo, Illinois via New Orleans, with Joseph leading the company of 207 saints. Hundreds of members came to see them off and the company was presented with gifts for the building of the Nauvoo Temple. The ship slipped anchor and those on board sang, 'How firm a foundation, ye saints of the Lord,' as hats and handkerchiefs were waved in fond farewell. The last words heard were 'When through the deep waters I call thee to go, / The rivers of sorrow shall not thee o'erflow.' "Soon all was a dim speck upon the ocean; recorded Parley P Pratt, "a few moments more and they were vanished from view on the wide expanse and lost in the distance. May God speed them onward in their course, and land them safe in their destined port." The voyage was not without difficulty and a few scares. The ship took on water and some thought they would be drowned. To assist in distributing the food ration, Joseph enlisted the help of non-member passenger Richard Bentley, who said that Joseph was "a kind good man, and treated me kindly."

In New Orleans, the company "took one of the best steamboats (the "General Pratt"), and for 11 shillings English each, and luggage, sailed to St. Louis, 800 or 1000 miles. "The country is seldom much above the river. There are many slave settlements; these often reminded us of the factory lords in England, in their mansions surrounded with cottages occupied by the poor oppressed laborer: it is much the same with the slaves and their masters, but the slaves pay no rent… It is a truly interesting scene to pass up this river; we often thought of the crowded population of England, who cannot get a foot of land in all their lifetime, and here we travel many hundred miles and see little but forests and no one to occupy it, and the best of land."

Joseph recorded the remarkable sight as he approached Nauvoo for the first time: "When we came within two miles of our journey's end, we began to see the effects of that industry for which the Saints are so remarkable: fences of rails and of pickets, houses and gardens on the edge of the prairie, such as we had not before seen. This said Brother [Lorenzo] Young, is Nauvoo, but we had two miles to go yet, so extensive had this settlement of the Saints become in so short a time! We soon passed the sacred place and foundation of the temple. The arches of the vault windows were not all finished. The sight of this though by the light of the moon only gave me peculiar feelings. The idea that it was done at the special command of the Almighty was a new thing in this age. It seemed to fill the mind with solemnity and to give a sacredness to the whole place."

Joseph found his sister Mercy now a widow. The house her late husband Robert Thompson had commenced for Joseph and his family had been left unfinished. Joseph was ill and unable to work much. Eventually, he began to labour for his brother-in-law Hyrum Smith, who allowed him some land to farm on shares. Unexpectedly, Joseph and Hannah received a substantial loan of money from her brother in England, George Greenwood. This enabled them to purchase some 20 acres of land on the prairie about two miles from the Temple site and by 1843, they had built a home. That summer, their son Heber was born. A fourth child, Joseph, followed on 13 July 1846. In his journal, Wilford Woodruff recorded that Fielding received his temple endowment in the same session as William Wines Phelps, Levi Richards, Lot Smith, and Cornelius P. Lott in the office over Joseph Smith's store on December 9, 1843. Fielding took an addition plural wife, Mary Ann Peake Greenhalgh in either 1843 or 1846. Hannah Fielding was troubled by what she had learnt of Joseph Smith’s preaching about "spiritual" wives. With many claiming that Joseph was in error, she began to have some doubts. Joseph confided to his diary: "I tell my wife I mean to hold on to the truth at any cost and the greatest cost would be to lose her, but her unbelief shall not stop us. I feel as though I can in spite of this bear her along. Our children are healthy and in every way promising, and we hope they will be in glory in a future day." Their differences evidently resolved, Joseph and Hannah were endowed and sealed at the hand of Joseph Smith. They were endowed again once the Nauvoo Temple was sufficiently complete, and had their four children sealed to them.

In Nauvoo, Joseph Fielding found himself a witness to apostasy in the Church and many false charges laid against the prophet Joseph Smith. He wrote, "As to me, I have evidence enough that Joseph is not fallen. I have seen him…organize the kingdom of God on the earth and am myself a member of it. In this I feel myself highly honored but I feel grieved that at this time of the greatest light and the greatest glory and honor, men of so much knowledge and understanding should cut themselves off." In September 1846, Joseph, his sisters Mary and Mercy, and their families were finally obliged to leave Nauvoo. Members of the Church had been leaving since February. Joseph sold his land for $4½, some horses, a wagon, and some cloth. The group only just crossed the Mississippi River with its nine wagons, 21 cattle and 43 sheep, before Joseph’s land was taken over by the Nauvoo attackers, from where they fired into the city.

== Migration west ==
Following the death of Joseph Smith, and Fielding's brother-in-law, Hyrum, the church underwent a crisis over an appropriate successor for the church president. Fielding and both of his widowed sisters chose to follow Brigham Young and move west with the greater part of the Saints.

Joseph described the scenes of chaos in the Battle of Nauvoo, "The poor Saints had to flee, sick or well. They hastened to the river but the citizens judged it not best to let men leave when they were so much needed, but the sick, the women and children got over as fast as they could. I went down to the bank of the river and found many of the Saints in distress. Some had left their goods and were destitute of food and clothing. Others had left their husbands in the battle. The cannons roared tremendously on both sides for several days."

In September 1846, Joseph, his sisters Mary and Mercy, and their families were finally obliged to leave Nauvoo. Members of the Church had been leaving since February. Joseph sold his land for $4.50, some horses, a wagon, and some cloth. The group only just crossed the Mississippi River with its nine wagons, 21 cattle and 43 sheep, before Joseph’s land was taken over by the Nauvoo attackers, from where they fired into the city. Joseph described the scenes of chaos in the Battle of Nauvoo, "The poor Saints had to flee, sick or well. They hastened to the river but the citizens judged it not best to let men leave when they were so much needed, but the sick, the women and children got over as fast as they could. I went down to the bank of the river and found many of the Saints in distress. Some had left their goods and were destitute of food and clothing. Others had left their husbands in the battle. The cannons roared tremendously on both sides for several days." He supported his sisters, their children and stepchildren, traveling with them to Winter Quarters, Nebraska and, in 1848, to Utah.

At Winter Quarters in 1847, Joseph and Hannah had a child Hyrum Thomas, but he died the same year. In due course, Joseph Fielding and his family made the trek to the Salt Lake Valley. There, two further children were born: Hannah Alice in 1849, and Sarah Ann in 1851.

He settled near Mary's family in Millcreek, Utah. He died there on December 19, 1863, aged 66. Hannah survived him to die in 1877, aged 57.

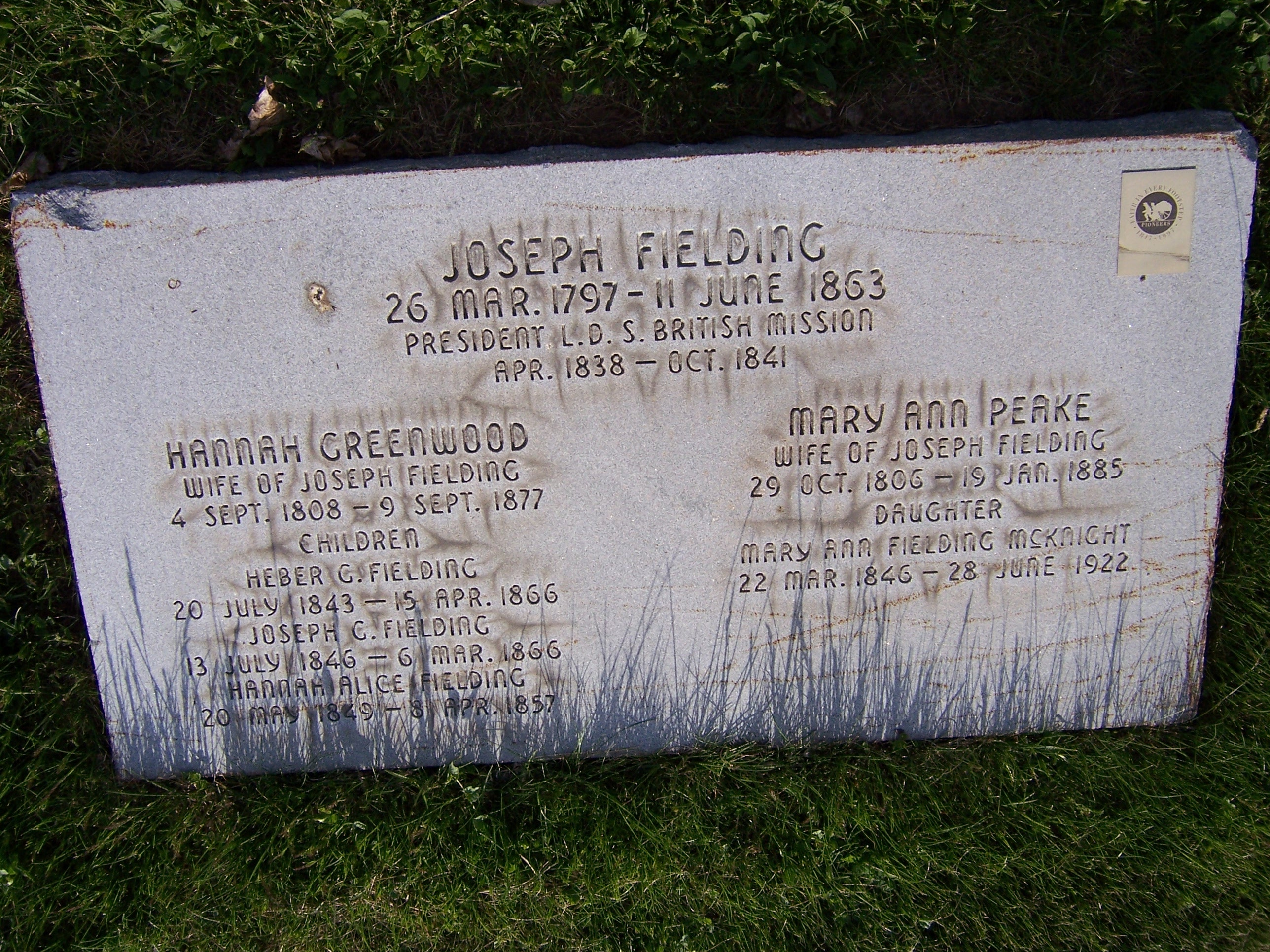
Joseph Fielding's grave marker
