= Upper Staploe =

Hamlet in Bedfordshire, England

Coordinates: 52.22443°N 0.33062°W

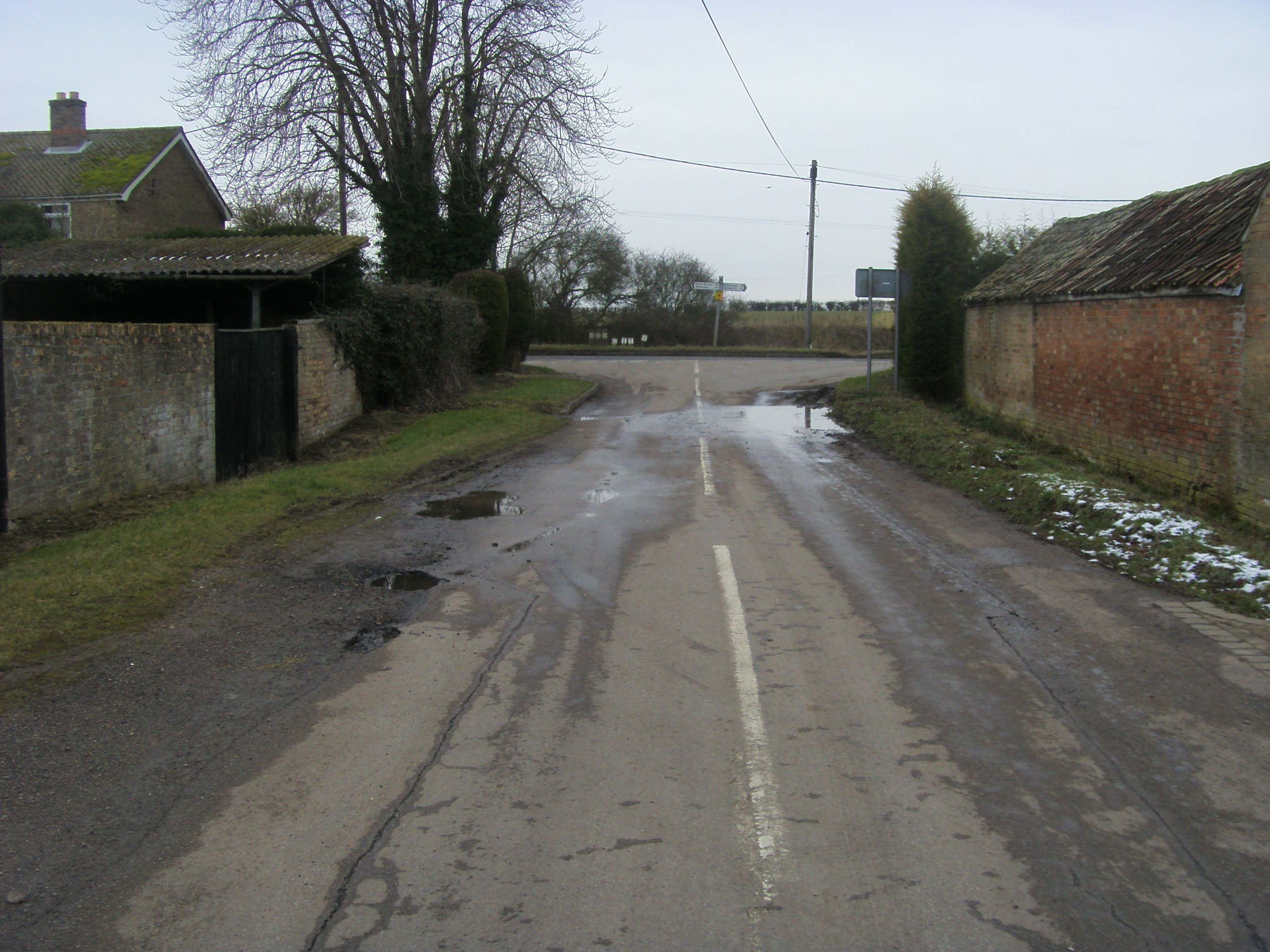

- Location within Bedfordshire
- OS grid reference: TL141597
- Civil parish: Staploe
- Unitary authority: Bedford
- Ceremonial county: Bedfordshire
- Region: East
- Country: England
- Sovereign state: United Kingdom
- Post town: ST NEOTS
- Postcode district: PE19
- Dialling code: 01480
- Police: Bedfordshire
- Fire: Bedfordshire
- Ambulance: East of England
- UK Parliament: North Bedfordshire

Upper Staploe is a hamlet located in the Borough of Bedford in the county of Bedfordshire, England. The settlement is close to Honeydon and Staploe, and forms part of the Staploe civil parish. Upper Staploe lies close to the county border with the Huntingdonshire district of Cambridgeshire.
