= We Thank Thee, O God, for a Prophet =

Latter-day Saint hymn

"We Thank Thee, O God, for a Prophet" is a hymn of the Church of Jesus Christ of Latter-day Saints (LDS Church). It has been sung at many general conferences of the LDS Church since it was published in 1863.

The text of the hymn was written sometime between 1860 and 1863 by William Fowler, an English convert to Mormonism. Joseph F. Smith reported that he was present at the first church worship service in England where Fowler brought the song to be sung. The song was first published in the LDS Church's 1863 hymnal, and has been included in every LDS hymnal since. The music is an adapted version of Caroline Sheridan Norton's "The Officer's Funeral March".

George D. Pyper described "We Thank Thee, O God, for a Prophet" as "exclusively a Latter-day Saint hymn; a Mormon heartthrob; a song of the Restoration". The name of the hymn is often used as the title of lessons in church curriculum or as the title of church sermons and inspirational messages.

"We Thank Thee, O God, for a Prophet" performed by the Tabernacle Choir at Temple Square

The first verse of the song acknowledges the Latter-day Saints' gratitude to God for the President of the Church, who is revered as a modern prophet. Subsequent verses thank God for the care and protection he provides to the members of the church.

The song is one of the 45 hymns that the church publishes in its basic curriculum sources that are used in areas of the world where the church is new or underdeveloped. As a result, it is often one of the first hymns new Latter-day Saints receive and learn.

"We Thank Thee, O God, for a Prophet" is hymn number 19 in the current LDS Church hymnal. The copyright for this version is owned by Intellectual Reserve, Inc., a corporation established by the LDS Church to hold its intellectual property. Intellectual Reserve allows copying or downloading of the music and lyrics of the song for incidental, noncommercial church, or noncommercial home uses. A similar version of the hymn is published as hymn number 307 in the Revelation section of Hymns of the Saints by the Community of Christ's Herald House publishing arm.

== Unusual usage ==
While preparing to speak at a CES fireside being held at Brigham Young University's Marriott Center on February 7, 1993, Howard W. Hunter, the president of the Quorum of the Twelve Apostles, was confronted by Cody Judy, who rushed onto the rostrum and threatened Hunter and the audience of 15,000 to 17,000. Judy carried a briefcase that he claimed contained a bomb and held what appeared to be a detonator-like device. Judy demanded that Hunter read a three-page document that supposedly detailed God's plan for Judy to lead the church, which Hunter refused to do. The audience spontaneously sang "We Thank Thee, O God, for a Prophet", during which students from the audience and then security personnel overtook Judy. After Judy was taken away, Hunter delivered his prepared remarks, a talk entitled "An Anchor to the Souls of Men".

== Lyrics ==
We thank thee, O God, for a prophet
To guide us in these latter days.
We thank thee for sending the gospel
To lighten our minds with its rays.
We thank thee for every blessing
Bestowed by thy bounteous hand.
We feel it a pleasure to serve thee
And love to obey thy command.

When dark clouds of trouble hang o’er us
And threaten our peace to destroy,
There is hope smiling brightly before us,
And we know that deliv’rance is nigh.
We doubt not the Lord nor his goodness.
We’ve proved him in days that are past.
The wicked who fight against Zion
Will surely be smitten at last.

We’ll sing of his goodness and mercy.
We’ll praise him by day and by night,
Rejoice in his glorious gospel,
And bask in its life-giving light.
Thus on to eternal perfection
The honest and faithful will go,
While they who reject this glad message
Shall never such happiness know.
