= Hannah Greenwood Fielding =

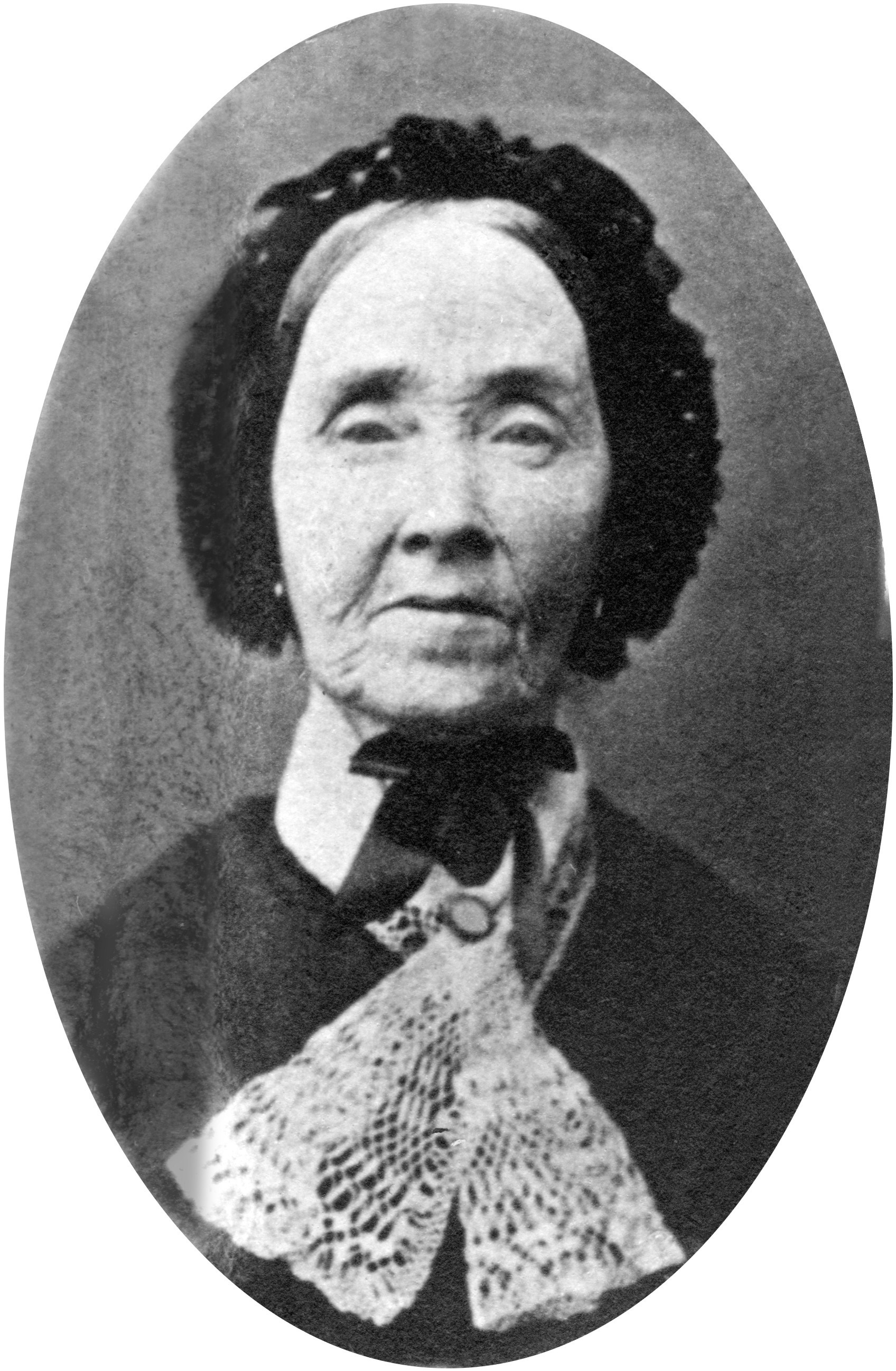

Personal details
- Born: September 4, 1808; Blackburn, England
- Died: September 9, 1877 (aged 69); Ogden, Utah, United States

Hannah Greenwood Fielding (September 4, 1808 – September 9, 1877) was the wife of early Latter Day Saints missionary Joseph Fielding. She died in Salt Lake City, Utah, 1877, at age 57. Hannah Greenwood married Joseph Fielding on June 11, 1838. Willard Richards was a witness to his marriage and Joseph was a witness to Willard's marriage to Jenetta Richards. Joseph and Hannah had six children, two of them born in Preston: Rachel on 27 June 1839, and Ellen on 2 September 1841.
