= Bushmead Priory =

Grade I listed building in Bedfordshire, England

- Location within Bedfordshire

Monastery information
- Full name: The Priory Church of Saint Mary, Bushmead
- Other name: Bissemede Priory
- Order: Augustinians
- Established: 1185/1195
- Disestablished: 4 January 1537
- Dedication: Saint Mary

Architecture
- Heritage designation: Scheduled monument, grade I listed building

Site
- Location: Staploe, Bedfordshire, England
- Coordinates: 52.233611°N 0.3675°W
- Visible remains: refectory and kitchen
- Public access: yes
- Website: https://www.english-heritage.org.uk/visit/places/bushmead-priory/

The Priory Church of Saint Mary, Bushmead, commonly called Bushmead Priory, was a monastic foundation for Augustinian Canons, located at Bushmead (a hamlet in Staploe parish) in the County of Bedfordshire in England. It is a Grade I listed building.

== Description ==
The remains of the 700-year-old priory stand today neighbouring a light industrial estate, and disused airfield, and lie between the villages of Colmworth and Little Staughton. Nothing survives of the priory church, and all but the refectory and kitchen of the claustral buildings have disappeared.

Never a large house, the community appears to have consisted of the prior and up to four canons.

The priory was founded around 1195 by William, Chaplain of Colmworth. Hugh de Beauchamp of Eaton Socon endowed the priory with 28 acres (113,000 m^{2}), the priory also held land around Coppingford chapel; during these early years it also held a considerable number of Selions, given to them by local people as gifts of faith. Around 1206 King John permitted the monks to enclose and clear part of the nearby Perry woods.

After William's death in 1215, Joseph, Chaplain of Coppingford, became head of the fraternity. Under his guidance the house became an Augustinian priory. The Augustinians, were then a comparatively new order, which ordained priests, but lived in community similar in style to monks.

Throughout the following years the priory prospered through gifts and grants. The monks wrote documents illustrating their daily lives, these became books of charters, called Cartularies. Unfortunately through the centuries very few of these charters have survived.

It was common for monastic orders at this time to be the beneficiaries of generous donations. However, it was equally common for disapproving heirs to object to the size of these gifts donated from their potential estates. One such heir was John Pateschull, unhappy at a bequest of £8 per annum in the will of his grandfather, after a dispute lasting many years, he had had the priory's cattle seized. Richard of Staughton, a senior Canon and later prior of Bushmead, called the bailiff and set out to recover them. The senior Canon was seized by John Pateschull's men and imprisoned. The dispute was finally ended through arbitration.

When Richard of Staughton became prior, he obtained permission from the bishop to form a boys' school; however it is thought he died of the Black Death before the project could be implemented.

The prior in 1418 was Robert Tychemerssh.

Following the Dissolution of the Monasteries by Henry VIII, the ownership of Bushmead Priory became the subject of a dispute between the St. John family of Bletsoe and Sir William Gascoigne of Cardington, the latter being Cardinal Wolsey's controller of the household. He had previously exchanged land with King Henry VIII and sought further recompense. The King waited until 1537, almost a year after the priory's dissolution, before allowing the priory to pass to Sir William.

Fifteen years later, in 1562, a Cambridgeshire man, William Gery, purchased the estate and almost immediately began building on the site of the priory. Around a hundred years later Richard Gery extended the site and formed a mansion (since demolished). There have obviously been many changes to the priory. A new floor, and fenestration (in the lower section) were fitted circa 1500, although only the rafters now remain. Clearly visible, though, are the major and various subsequent minor alterations, giving an interesting insight into its architectural history.

It is a rare example of King post, and timber frame roof architecture.

The site is now in the care of English Heritage and is open to the public at weekends during Spring and Summer.

== Burials ==
- Henry of Braybrooke

== See also ==
- List of monastic houses in England
- List of monastic houses in Bedfordshire
