= Staploe =

Village in Bedfordshire, England

Coordinates: 52.22°N 0.33°W

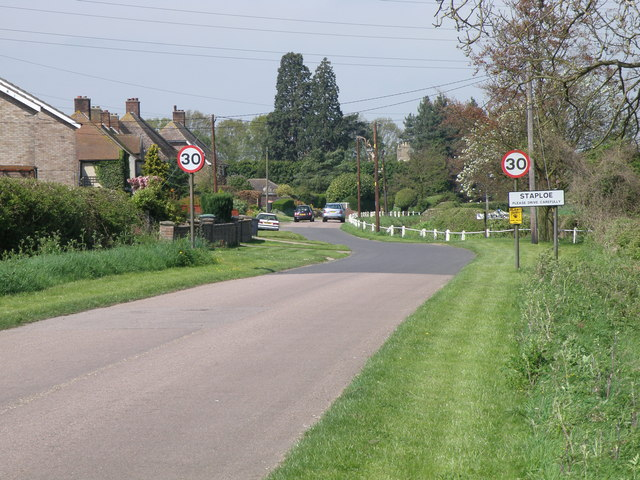

- Location within Bedfordshire
- Population: 331 (2011 Census including Begwary & Honeydon)
- OS grid reference: TL140685
- Unitary authority: Bedford
- Ceremonial county: Bedfordshire
- Region: East
- Country: England
- Sovereign state: United Kingdom
- Post town: ST NEOTS
- Postcode district: PE19
- Dialling code: 01480
- Police: Bedfordshire
- Fire: Bedfordshire
- Ambulance: East of England
- UK Parliament: North Bedfordshire

Staploe is a village and civil parish located in the Borough of Bedford in Bedfordshire, England.

Staploe was originally a hamlet of Eaton Socon. Under the Local Government Act 1958, Eaton Socon was merged with the neighbouring town of St Neots in Cambridgeshire. Staploe was therefore created as a civil parish in 1965.

The parish of Staploe includes other former parts of Eaton Socon - Duloe, Honeydon, and Upper Staploe. Bushmead Priory and the hamlet of Bushmead are also in the parish.
