= Mary Fielding Smith =

English member of the Latter Day Saint movement

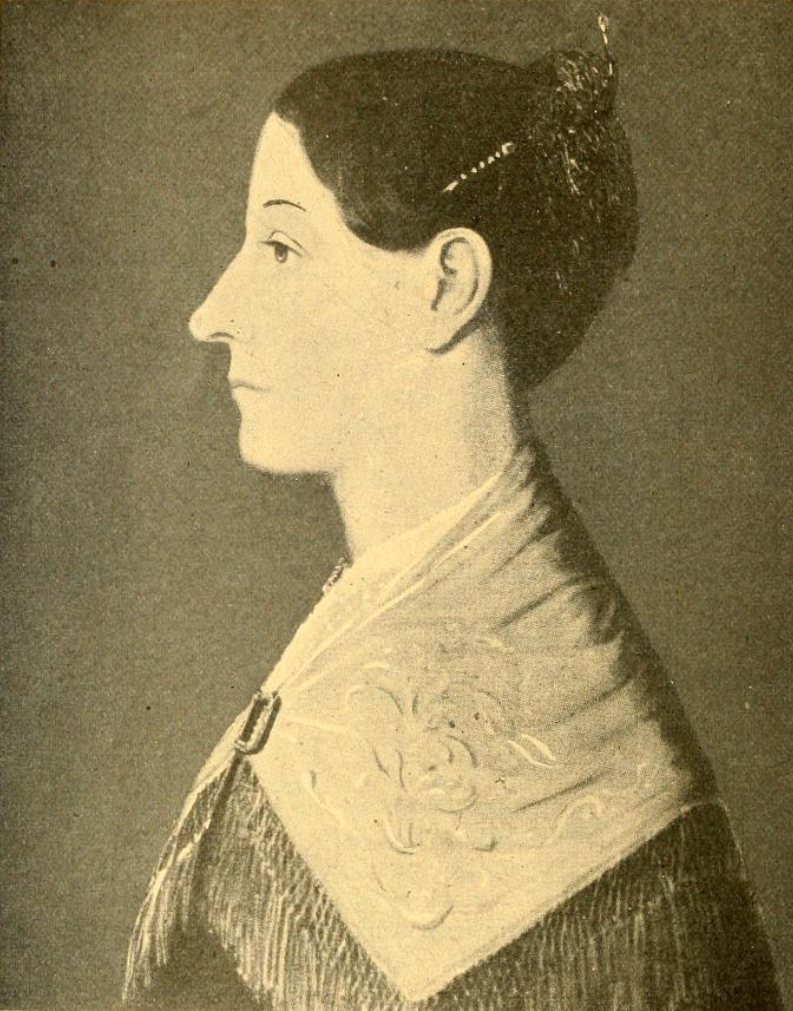
- Painting of Mary Fielding Smith by Sutcliffe Maudsley

Personal details
- Born: Mary Fielding; July 21, 1801; Honeydon, Bedfordshire, England
- Died: September 21, 1852 (aged 51); Salt Lake City, Utah Territory
- Cause of death: Pneumonia
- Resting place: Salt Lake City Cemetery; 40.7772°N 111.858°W
- Spouse(s): Hyrum Smith (1837–1844); Heber C. Kimball (1844–1852)
- Children: 2, including Joseph F. Smith

Mary Fielding Smith Kimball (July 21, 1801 – September 21, 1852) was an early member of the Latter Day Saint movement, the second wife of Latter Day Saint leader Hyrum Smith, and the mother of Joseph F. Smith, who became president of the Church of Jesus Christ of Latter-day Saints (LDS Church).

== Early life ==
Mary Fielding was born in Honeydon (Honidon), Bedfordshire, England, on July 21, 1801. She was the sixth child of John Fielding and Rachel Ibbotson, who were active in the growing Methodist movement in the area. In 1834, Mary emigrated to join her brother, Joseph, and her sister, Mercy, in Toronto, Upper Canada.

== Joining the Latter Day Saint church ==
The three Fielding siblings were introduced to the Church of the Latter Day Saints in 1836 by their friend, John Taylor. Taylor and his wife were in the same congregation as the Fieldings, all of whom were "disenchanted Methodists". On a trip to Toronto, John Taylor came in contact with Latter Day Saint missionary Parley P. Pratt and shortly after brought Pratt to meet the Fieldings. They were baptized on May 21, 1836, in a creek near their home. Mary, Joseph, and Mercy moved to Kirtland, Ohio, the following spring to join the larger body of the church.

== Family and later years ==
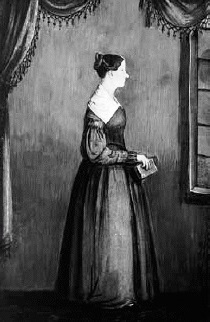

Well educated, Mary earned a living through teaching school, tutoring private pupils and acting as a governess. At the suggestion of the church's president, Joseph Smith, the recently widowed Hyrum Smith courted Mary Fielding and the couple married on December 24, 1837. Mary accepted the responsibility of caring for and raising Hyrum's children from his first marriage, including the future church patriarch John Smith.

In March 1838, Hyrum was among the church leaders taken to prison by the Missouri militia. At this time, Smith was pregnant with her first child, Joseph. Smith went to Quincy, Illinois, with the remaining church members and, after Hyrum escaped from jail, they moved to Nauvoo, Illinois (also known as Commerce). Their second child, Martha, was born in Illinois.

After Hyrum was killed in 1844, Smith chose to follow the direction of Brigham Young and the Quorum of the Twelve Apostles. She and her family were among the poorer church members driven out of Nauvoo in the fall of 1846, who experienced the incident later known as the "miracle of the quails". She went to Winter Quarters and then on to the Salt Lake Valley.

One story recounts Smith's trip across the plains with Heber C. Kimball's pioneer company. One of the captains, Cornelius P. Lott, questioned her preparation and suggested she stay behind and wait for others to help her: he called her a burden to the whole company. In response, Smith said that she would not only stay with the company but would arrive in the Salt Lake Valley before Lott and without any of his help. She reportedly arrived in the Valley one day before Lott. She would eventually marry Heber C. Kimball.

== Death ==
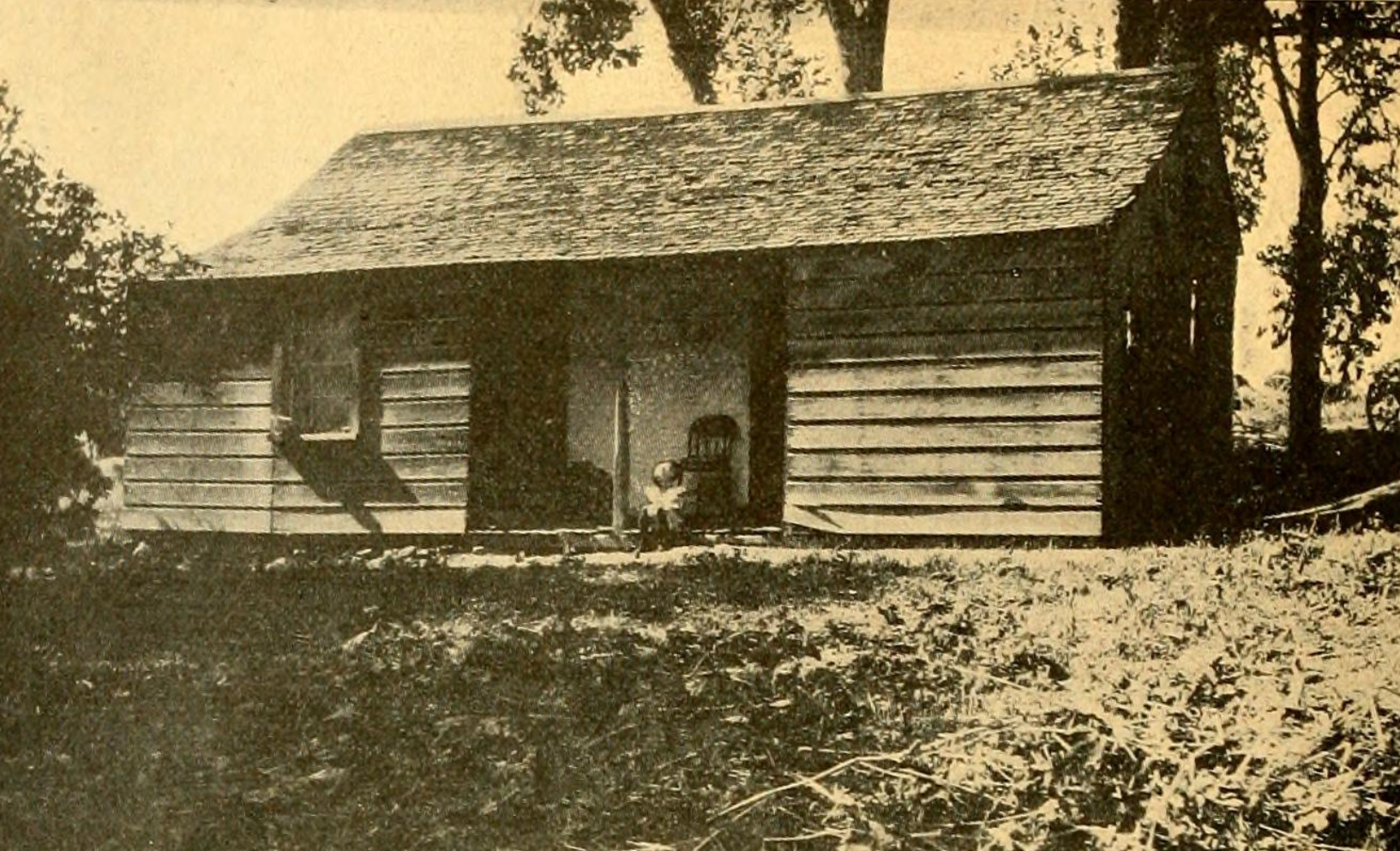
Mary Fielding Smith House in Salt Lake City Utah

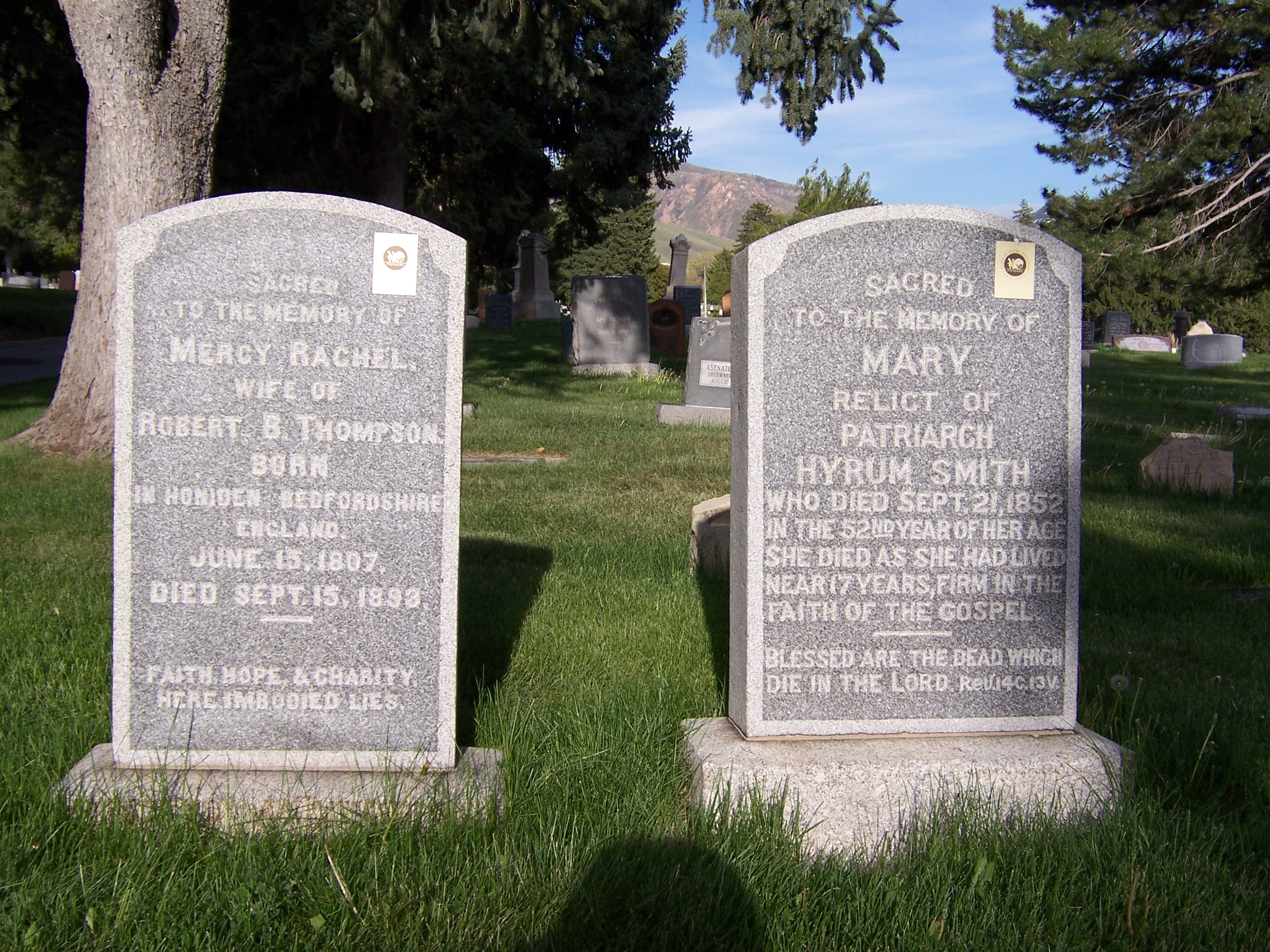
Mary Fielding Smith and Mercy Fielding Thompson's grave markers

On September 21, 1852, Smith died in Salt Lake City, Utah Territory, at the home of her second husband, Heber C. Kimball, apparently of pneumonia. She was buried at Salt Lake City Cemetery. Although she was widely known and respected during her lifetime, her son, Joseph F. Smith, further enhanced her reputation after her death as he presented her as a role model of courage and faithfulness in public addresses, sermons and articles.
