= Joseph F. Smith =

President of The Church of Jesus Christ of Latter-day Saints

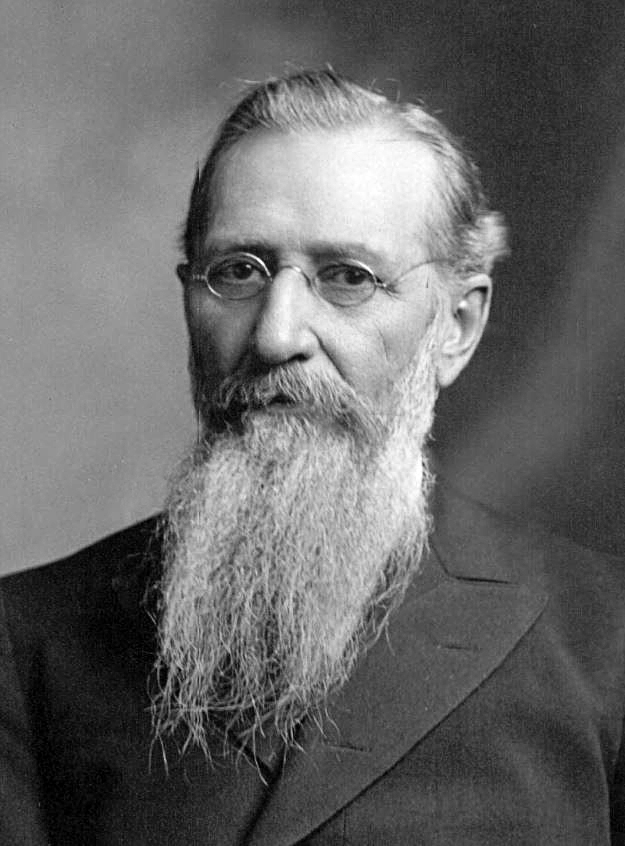
- Smith, c. 1905

6th President of the Church of Jesus Christ of Latter-day Saints
- October 17, 1901 – November 19, 1918
- Predecessor: Lorenzo Snow
- Successor: Heber J. Grant

President of the Quorum of the Twelve Apostles
- October 10, 1901 – October 17, 1901
- Predecessor: Brigham Young Jr.
- Successor: Brigham Young Jr.
- End reason: Became President of the Church

First Counselor in the First Presidency
- October 6, 1901 – October 10, 1901
- Called by: Lorenzo Snow
- End reason: Dissolution of First Presidency upon death of Lorenzo Snow

Second Counselor in the First Presidency
- April 7, 1889 – October 6, 1901
- Called by: Wilford Woodruff
- End reason: Called as First Counselor in the First Presidency

Quorum of the Twelve Apostles
- July 25, 1887 – April 7, 1889
- End reason: Called as Second Counselor in the First Presidency

Second Counselor in the First Presidency
- October 10, 1880 – July 25, 1887
- Called by: John Taylor
- End reason: Dissolution of First Presidency upon death of John Taylor

Quorum of the Twelve Apostles
- August 29, 1877 – October 10, 1880
- End reason: Called as Second Counselor in the First Presidency

Counselor in the First Presidency
- July 1, 1866 – August 29, 1877
- Called by: Brigham Young
- End reason: Dissolution of First Presidency upon death of Brigham Young

LDS Church Apostle
- July 1, 1866 – November 19, 1918
- Called by: Brigham Young
- Reason: Brigham Young's discretion
- Reorganization at end of term: Melvin J. Ballard ordained

Personal details
- Born: Joseph Fielding Smith; November 13, 1838; Far West, Missouri, U.S.
- Died: November 19, 1918 (aged 80); Salt Lake City, Utah, U.S.
- Resting place: Salt Lake City Cemetery; 40°46′37.92″N 111°51′28.8″W
- Spouse(s): Levira Annette Clark Smith (m. 1859; div. 1867) Julina Lambson (m. 1866) Sarah Ellen Richards (m. 1868; died 1915) Edna Lambson (m. 1871) Alice Ann Kimball (m. 1883) Mary Taylor Schwartz (m. 1884)
- Children: 48 (43 biological, 5 adopted)
- Parents: Hyrum Smith; Mary Fielding
- Signature

Joseph Fielding Smith Sr. (November 13, 1838 – November 19, 1918) was an American religious leader who served as the sixth president of the Church of Jesus Christ of Latter-day Saints (LDS Church). He was a nephew of Joseph Smith, founder of the Latter Day Saint movement, and the last LDS Church president who had personally known him.

== Biography ==
Smith was the son of church patriarch Hyrum Smith and his second wife, Mary Fielding, a British convert to the church who married Hyrum after the death of his first wife, Jerusha Barden Smith (1805–1837). In addition to her two children, Mary raised the six children born to Hyrum and Jerusha.

=== Early life ===
Smith was born in Far West, Missouri, on November 13, 1838. Just a few days before he was born, his father had been taken prisoner under the auspices of Missouri Executive Order 44 (infamously called the "extermination order" due to its threat against the lives of Mormons who refused to leave the state after clashes between them and a Missouri militia). At point of bayonet, Hyrum was marched to his home in Far West and ordered to say farewell to his wife. He was told that his "doom was sealed" and that he would never see her again. Hyrum was still in custody in Liberty Jail, Missouri, when Smith was born. He was named after his uncles Joseph Smith and Joseph Fielding. His mother and maternal aunt, Mercy Fielding Thompson, fled with their children to Quincy, Illinois, early in 1839, and they later moved to Nauvoo, Illinois, when the majority of the church's members settled. Hyrum was later released from custody during a transfer from Liberty Jail and joined his family in Nauvoo. Joseph F. Smith stated as an adult that he had memories of Nauvoo, and could recall his Uncle Joseph and events that occurred at his uncle's home; he was nearly six years old when his father and uncle were killed in Carthage, Illinois, on June 27, 1844.

=== Winter Quarters ===
Smith's family remained in Nauvoo until September 1846, at which time his mother took their family and fled the city, camping on the west side of the Mississippi River among the trees on its banks, without wagon or tent, while the city was bombarded by mobs. His mother was later able to exchange their property in Illinois for a wagon and team of oxen. Smith and his family, along with many other Latter Day Saints, fled the American Midwest. The seven-year-old Smith drove the team of oxen with his family to the Latter Day Saint encampment at Winter Quarters, Nebraska.

While at Winter Quarters, Smith and another boy, Thomas Burdick, were out on horseback some distance from the settlement, watching the cattle graze. They saw a band of twenty or thirty American Indians ride into the valley on the other side of the cattle. Burdick rode back to camp to get help while Smith rode toward the Indians and got between the Indians and the herd before the Indians reached them. Smith was able to turn the herd back toward the settlement, and, coupled with the noise and arrival of the Indians, started a stampede which saved the herd from capture. He was still riding with the herd at full speed when two Indians picked him up off of his horse from either side and dropped him to the ground. A company of men from the encampment then arrived, chased away the fleeing Indians, and recovered the herd, but Smith's horse was stolen.

Smith and his family remained at Winter Quarters until the spring of 1848 when Smith drove his mother's wagon across the plains to the Salt Lake Valley.

=== Utah childhood ===
After arriving in the Salt Lake Valley in 1848, Smith's mother worked to raise her own children as well as the children of her husband's first wife. Mary Fielding Smith died in 1852, apparently of pneumonia, leaving Smith an orphan at the age of 13. Smith reported that he was devastated by his mother's death, and relied upon the emotional support and help of Brigham Young and his stepfather, Heber C. Kimball. Even with the support of his older half-brother John Smith, Smith assumed primary responsibility for his young sister, Martha Ann, and subsequently left school in 1854. His leaving school was closely linked to his resistance of a teacher's attempt to whip Martha.

=== Missions and military service ===
At the age of fifteen, Smith was called to go on his first LDS mission to the Sandwich Islands under the direction of apostle Parley P. Pratt. This mission assignment at an unusually young age happened after Smith assaulted a teacher who he felt was unfairly punishing another student; decades later Smith wrote in the LDS publication Improvement Era of the burning rage and explosive temper of his youth which he blamed in part on his reaction to the deaths of his parents. Smith was ordained an elder by George A. Smith on April 24, 1854, and received his endowment at the Endowment House the same day. He then traveled to San Bernardino, California, where he worked to earn money for passage on a ship to San Francisco. In the San Francisco area, possibly in what is now Fremont, California, on the farm of John Horner, he was again employed in agricultural pursuits seeking to earn money for passage to Hawaii.

After a difficult period of adjustment to the local culture, Smith successfully learned the Hawaiian language and reported great success in four years of missionary work on the islands. Besides serving with various American companions on his mission, he also had two Hawaiian companions: Paake, who was a property manager for some of Jonathan Napela's property, and Lalawaia. He spent the first part of his mission on Maui, but later presided over groups of branches on the island of Hawaii and then over all LDS Church units on Molokai.

Smith was called back to Utah Territory in 1857, largely as a result of the Utah War. He traveled overland from San Francisco to San Bernardino and then north through Las Vegas on his return. He arrived in Utah in February 1858. Shortly after this, Smith joined the territory's militia, named the Nauvoo Legion, and spent several months patrolling the eastern side of the Rocky Mountains. Later in his tour of duty, he served as chaplain of Colonel Heber C. Kimball's regiment, with the rank of captain. After tensions between the church and the federal government abated, Smith assisted his relatives in their return to northern Utah from areas of southern Utah, where they had taken their families for safety.

During the 1858–59 session of the Utah territorial legislature, Smith served as the sergeant-at-arms. In 1859, he married his first wife, Levira Smith. In the LDS Church, Smith was ordained a seventy in March 1858 and then a high priest and a member of the Salt Lake Stake high council in October 1858.

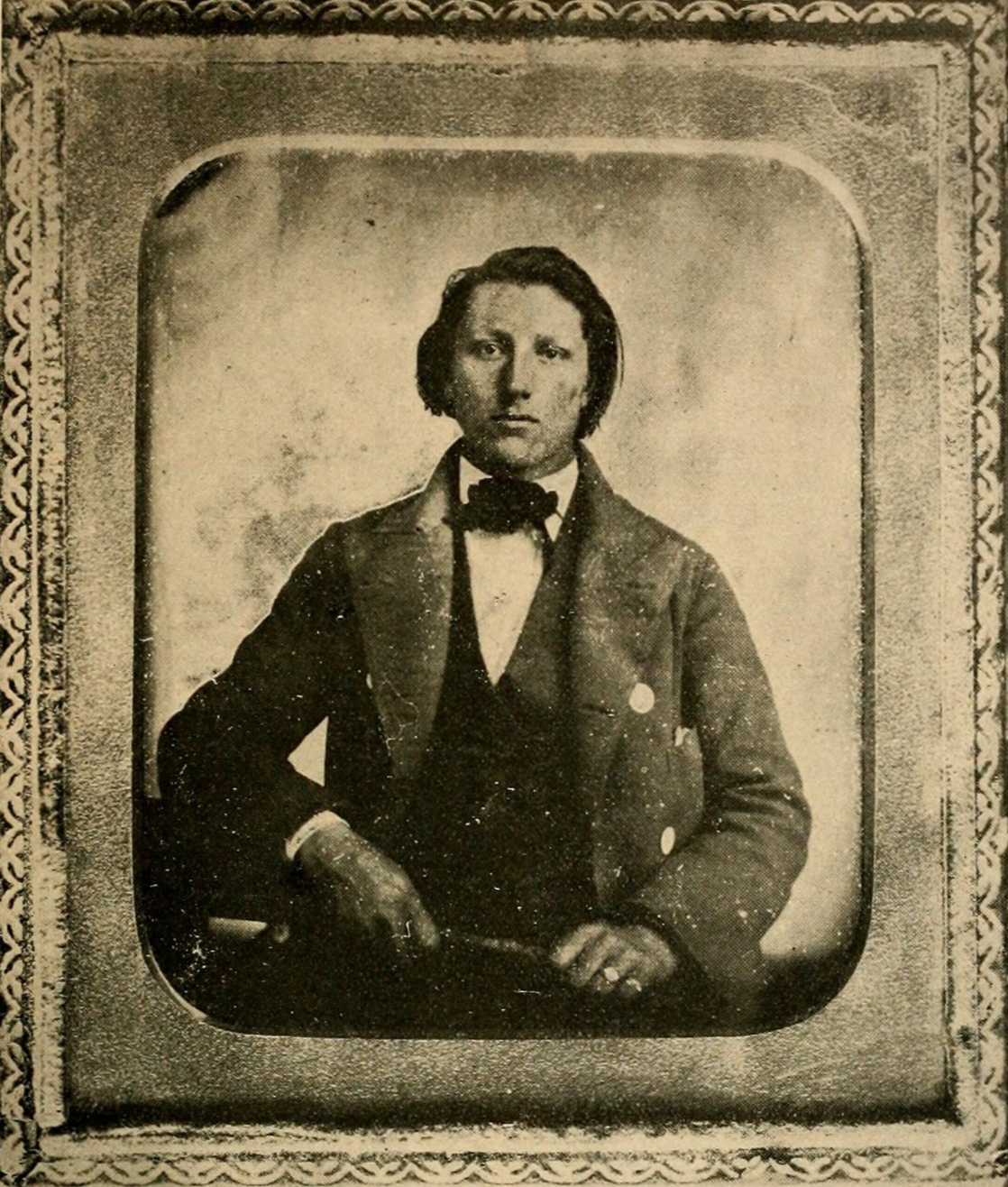
Joseph F. Smith at age 19

In 1860, at 22 years of age, Smith was sent on a mission to Great Britain. He and his cousin, Samuel H. B. Smith, drove mule teams over the plains to Winter Quarters to help pay their way. Shortly after arriving in England, Smith was made the conference president in Sheffield. Among the church members in that city was William Fowler; Smith was present at the meeting where Fowler's hymn "We Thank Thee, O God, for a Prophet" was first sung. After a short time, Smith was appointed to the pastorate, an office that existed only in the British Mission for a short time. In this position, he presided over the Sheffield Conference as well as four other adjacent conferences. He served in the British Mission for three years, the last part under mission president George Q. Cannon, when he was sent on short assignments to Denmark and France. Smith left England in June 1863. After a short stay in New York City to earn enough money to return home, he served as the chaplain of a Mormon pioneer wagon company bound for Utah from Nebraska.

Smith had only been home for a short while when he was called to accompany Ezra T. Benson, Lorenzo Snow, William W. Cluff, and Alma L. Smith on a mission to the Sandwich Islands to correct the problems in the church caused by Walter M. Gibson. Gibson misrepresented his blessing from Brigham Young as an appointment to be a leader in the church, and then established a separate church with a quorum of the 12, calling himself a prophet, and charging people to receive the priesthood. Smith acted as principal interpreter for the apostles, and after Gibson was excommunicated, Smith was left in charge of the mission. Smith returned home in the winter of 1864–65. Prior to leaving Hawai'i Smith and William W. Cluff located a new gathering place for the Saints in Laie, Hawaii.

Smith had a notable experience during this mission. The group anchored their boat in a rough channel in order to go ashore, proposing that the party should land using the freight boat. Smith was strongly opposed to this, saying that the boat was unfit for the rough waters and that there was a great danger of capsizing. He offered to go ashore alone to obtain a boat fit to transport the party, to which they refused. They were persistent, however, chiding him for his waywardness, with one leader even saying, "Young man, you would be better to obey counsel." Smith then reiterated his impression of danger, imploring them not to go, but they insisted, so he asked that they leave their satchels, clothes, and valuables and permit him to stay. They reluctantly consented and set out for land. Partway there, the freight boat was overturned by the rough water about 20 or 30 feet deep, and Lorenzo Snow nearly drowned in the ocean. Snow's unconscious body was recovered, and on shore they were able to resuscitate him. Thanks to Smith's actions, all of their belongings were saved.

=== Clerical and political career ===
Joseph F. Smith in 1876.

Upon his return home, Smith was employed in the Church Historian's office for a number of years. It was while working in this position he met his second wife, Julina Lambson, who was a niece of Bathsheba W. Smith, a wife of church apostle George A. Smith.

Smith also served as a clerk in the Endowment House from the death of Brigham Young until the building was razed in 1890. Smith's latter mission to Hawaii was largely prompted by the fact that Smith held this position: since he had in his possession the records of the Endowment House, Smith could be a valuable witness for the federal government's prosecutions of Mormon polygamists.

Smith served seven terms in the Utah territorial House of Representatives, specifically from 1865 to 1870, 1872, and 1874. He was a member of the Salt Lake City Council for many years and in this position was a key advocate of establishing city parks. He was thus one of the people involved with the establishment of Pioneer Park and Liberty Park in Salt Lake City. In 1868 and 1869, Smith served as a member of the Provo City Council. Smith served as a member of the Utah Territorial Council, essentially the equivalent of the upper house of the legislature, in 1880 and 1882. He also served as president of the Utah constitutional convention in 1882. The state constitution produced by this convention did not go into effect because Congress did not vote to grant Utah statehood until 1895.

Smith also served as a LDS Church representative on boards of many Utah businesses.

== Marriages and family ==
=== Levira Annette Clark Smith ===
Levira Annette Clark Smith. First wife of Joseph F. Smith.

On April 5, 1859, the twenty year old Smith married his sixteen-year-old cousin, Levira Annette Clark Smith, daughter of Samuel H. Smith, performed by Brigham Young in his office. When Joseph F. Smith left on his mission to England the next year, his companion for the journey was Levira's brother, Samuel. When Smith returned from his mission in 1863, his wife Levira was in a poor mental state, suffering from what was most likely major depression. She would spend weeks at a time unable to get out of bed or function during Smith's mission, during which time Brigham Young acted "with kind and fatherly care." Smith wrote of the state he found Levira upon returning home, "emaciated, enfeebled ... a mere shadow of her former self." Smith became her primary caregiver during the next six months, before Brigham Young assigned him to another mission in Hawaii.

Levira left to live with relatives in California in September 1864. When Smith returned to California in November 1864 Levira did not feel well enough to return to Utah in the winter time. Smith disagreed and they departed on a wagon train to Utah, but she only made it as far as Dutch Flats, Nevada before becoming too ill to continue. After consulting local women, Smith decided the best course of action for Levira would be to return to San Francisco. Upon returning to San Francisco, Levira began to bleed heavily off and on for the next six months, and was informed by a doctor she had probably miscarried.

As Levira and Smith stayed apart, their letters grew more acrimonious. By summer of 1865 it became clear that Levira did not want to return to Utah, and was worried Smith was considering taking on a plural wife. In July 1865 Levira made arrangements with Brigham Young to return to Utah, which Smith found insulting. Levira spent much of the time in Utah living with her mother. When Smith did take a plural wife in spring of 1866, he said Levira "freely gave her consent thereto." Shortly thereafter Levira permanently moved out to live with her mother.

==== Divorce ====
Joseph F. Smith and wife Julina L. Smith on their golden wedding anniversary.

On June 10, 1867 Levira filed for legal separation. By August 1867, the fighting between Levira and Smith attracted the attention of Brigham Young, who intervened. Young asked Levira to list her grievances. Levira stated that Smith was verbally abusive, discounting her illness and once stating that she "ought to have a hole bored in the top of [her] head and some manure put into it for brains," and that telling her that the inability to have children allowed her to "whore it up." Levira recounted that Smith walked into a room where a man had been reading to her alone, and "he called me a d_m [sic?] whore a little damned illegitimate whore and a liar and if he ever caught a man in my room again there would be bloodshed if he had to swing for it, he threw my chair back against the stove." Smith responded that his comment about "manure" was "in jest," and stated regarding finding Levira alone being read to, "I do believe believe that if I had been armed I would have done violence." Levira also accused Smith of physical violence towards her, striking her with a rope. Smith responded that it was not with a rope, but with a peach tree branch as thick as an "office pencil," framing the violence in the 19th century context of the legal right of a husband to punish his wife, according to Smith, "like a willful and disobedient child."

Levira moved to California and divorced him on grounds of adultery with Smith's second wife, Julina Lambson. Smith and Levira had no children.

=== Later marriages and children ===
Seven years after his first marriage (1866), Brigham Young directed Smith to take a plural wife, Julina Lambson (who became the mother of future president Joseph Fielding Smith).

In addition to Levira, Smith had five other plural wives, with whom he fathered 43 children. He also adopted five children. Thirteen of his biological children preceded him in death: Mercy, Leonora, Sarah Ellen, Heber, Rhoda, Alice, Hyrum, Alfred, Albert, Robert, Zina, Ruth, and John. His adopted son Edward also preceded him in death.

List of wives and children
- Julina Lambson (July 18, 1849 – January 10, 1936). Married May 6, 1866. Julina was a nurse and midwife.
  - Edward Arthur Smith (adopted) (November 1, 1858, Brampton, England – July 17, 1911, Raymond, Alberta, Canada)
  - Mercy Josephine Smith (August 14, 1867 – June 6, 1870)
  - Mary Sophronia Smith (October 7, 1869 – January 5, 1948)
  - Donette Smith (September 17, 1872 – September 15, 1961)
  - Joseph Fielding Smith Jr. (July 19, 1876 – July 2, 1972)
  - David Asael Smith (May 24, 1879 – April 6, 1952)
  - George Carlos Smith (October 14, 1881 – February 23, 1931)
  - Julina Clarissa Smith (February 10, 1884 – August 1, 1923)
  - Elias Wesley Smith (April 21, 1886, Laie, Hawaii – December 28, 1970)
  - Emily Jane Smith (September 11, 1888 – December 12, 1982)
  - Rachael Smith (December 11, 1890 – December 14, 1986)
  - Edith Eleanor Smith (January 3, 1894 – May 21, 1987)
  - Marjorie Virginia Smith (adopted) December 7, 1906 – November 17, 1994)
- Sarah Ellen Richards (August 24, 1850 – March 22, 1915). Married on March 1, 1868. Sarah was a daughter of Willard Richards and his wife Sarah Longstroth.
  - Sarah Ellen Smith (February 5, 1869 – February 11, 1869)
  - Leonora Smith (January 30, 1871 – December 23, 1907)
  - Joseph Richards Smith (February 22, 1873 – October 2, 1954)
  - Heber John Smith (July 3, 1876 – March 3, 1877)
  - Rhoda Ann Smith (July 20, 1878 – July 6, 1879)
  - Minerva Smith (April 30, 1880 – January 24, 1958)
  - Alice Smith (July 27, 1882 – April 29, 1901)
  - Willard Richards Smith (November 20, 1884 – September 11, 1972)
  - Franklin Richards Smith (May 12, 1888 – December 25, 1967)
  - Jeanetta Smith (August 25, 1891 – January 27, 1932)
  - Asenath Smith (December 28, 1896 – August 3, 1982)
- Edna Lambson (March 3, 1851 – February 28, 1926). Married on May 5, 1871. She was the sister of Julina Lambson, who was also one of Smith's wives.
  - Hyrum Mack Smith (March 21, 1872 – January 23, 1918)
  - Alvin Fielding Smith (July 19, 1874 – January 4, 1948)
  - Alfred Jason Smith (December 13, 1876 – April 6, 1878)
  - Edna Melissa Smith (October 6, 1879 – October 26, 1958)
  - Albert Jesse Smith (September 16, 1881 – August 25, 1883)
  - Robert Smith (November 12, 1883 – February 4, 1886)
  - Emma Smith (August 21, 1888 – December 28, 1969)
  - Zina Smith (October 11, 1890 – October 25, 1915)
  - Ruth Smith (December 21, 1893 – March 17, 1898)
  - Martha Smith (May 12, 1897 – August 7, 1977)
- Alice Ann Kimball (September 6, 1858 – December 19, 1946). Married on December 6, 1883. Alice was Heber C. Kimball's daughter, and the twin of Andrew Kimball, father of Spencer W. Kimball.
  - Charles Coulson Smith (adopted) (November 19, 1881 – April 20, 1933)
  - Heber Chase Smith (adopted) (November 19, 1881 – December 29, 1971)
  - Alice May Smith (adopted) (October 11, 1877 – October 20, 1920)
  - Lucy Mack Smith (April 14, 1890 – November 24, 1933)
  - Andrew Kimball Smith (January 6, 1893 – August 23, 1951)
  - Jesse Kimball Smith (May 21, 1896 – June 9, 1953)
  - Fielding Kimball Smith (April 9, 1900 – October 20, 1974)
- Mary Taylor Schwartz (April 30, 1865 – December 5, 1956). Married on January 13, 1884. Mary was Agnes Taylor's daughter and church president John Taylor's niece.
  - John Schwartz Smith (August 20, 1888 – August 3, 1889)
  - Calvin Schwartz Smith (May 29, 1890 – June 15, 1966)
  - Samuel Schwartz Smith (October 26, 1892, Franklin, Idaho – May 10, 1983)
  - James Schwartz Smith (November 13, 1894, Franklin, Idaho – November 6, 1950)
  - Agnes Smith (November 3, 1897 – March 9, 1966)
  - Silas Schwartz Smith (January 3, 1900 – April 23, 1986)
  - Royal Grant Smith (May 21, 1906 – May 30, 1971)

One of Smith's granddaughters, Amelia Smith, married Bruce R. McConkie, who later became a member of the Quorum of the Twelve Apostles.

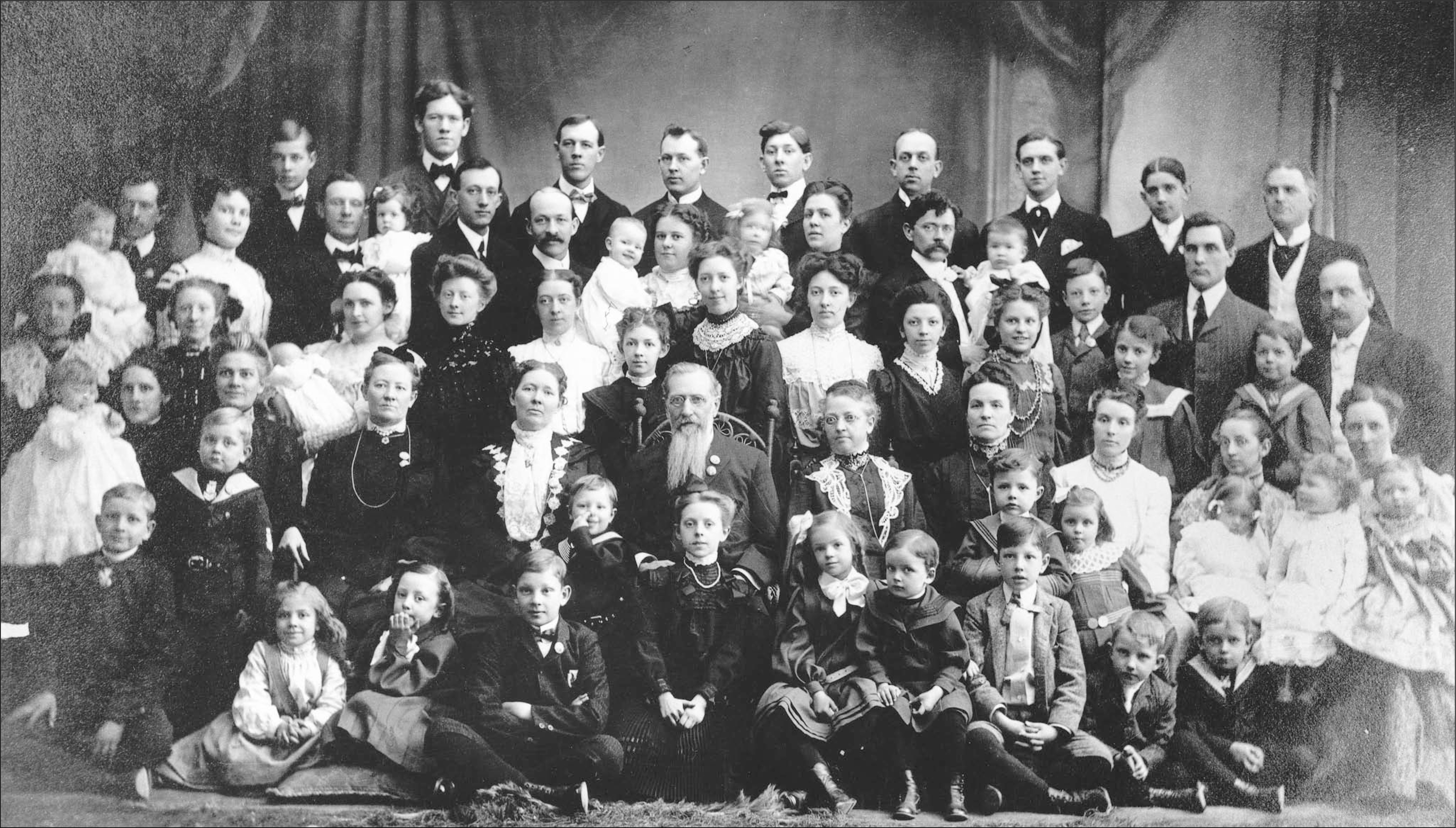
This turn of the century family portrait was taken close to the time Joseph F. Smith succeeded Lorenzo Snow as president of the LDS Church in October 1901. Besides Levira, with whom he had no children, Smith had five other wives and forty-eight children. His wives are (L to R seated by Smith): Mary Taylor Schwartz (married, 1884, seven children); Edna Lambson (married 1871, ten children); Julina Lambson (married 1866, thirteen children, including Joseph Fielding Smith—top row, center); Sarah Ellen Richards (married 1868, eleven children); Alice Ann Kimball (married 1883, seven children); circa 1904

== General authority ==
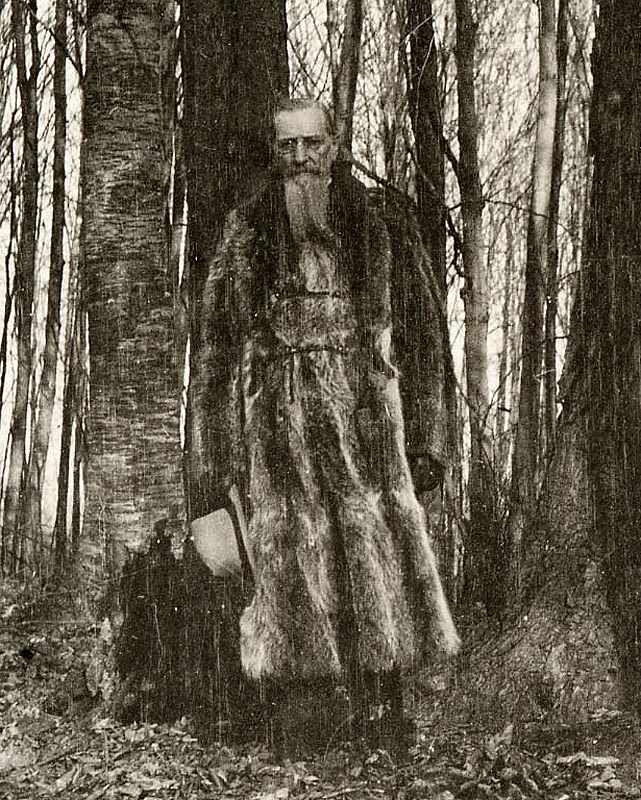
Joseph F. Smith in the Sacred Grove, ca. 1905

On July 1, 1866, Smith became a general authority of the LDS Church when he was ordained an apostle by Brigham Young and sustained as a counselor to the First Presidency, where he served until Young's death. However, he was not sustained as a member of the Quorum of the Twelve Apostles until the church's October 1867 conference. On February 28, 1874, Smith left for his second mission to England, serving as president of the European Mission from 1874 to 1875, returning home upon the death of First Presidency member George A. Smith. He was then called to preside over the Davis Stake until he left again in the spring of 1877 for his third mission to England. When news arrived of the death of Young, Smith was released and returned home. The following year, Smith served an Eastern States Mission with Orson Pratt, visiting noteworthy places in the history of the church in Missouri, Ohio, New York and Illinois. During this trip they met with and interviewed David Whitmer.

In October 1880, three years after Young's death, Smith was named second counselor in the First Presidency to church president John Taylor, serving from 1880 to 1887. He later served as second counselor to Wilford Woodruff (1889–98), and as second counselor to Lorenzo Snow (1898–1901). Smith was appointed first counselor to Snow on the death of first counselor George Q. Cannon, but, as Snow himself died only four days later, Smith never served in that position. He succeeded Snow as president of the LDS Church and president of the Salt Lake Temple. He served as president of the temple until 1911, when he transferred the responsibility to Anthon H. Lund.

Smith also served as editor of the Improvement Era and Juvenile Instructor, and general superintendent of the Sunday School and Young Men's Mutual Improvement Association.

Church president Wilford Woodruff issued his Manifesto proscribing new polygamist marriages in September 1890. Smith's reaction to the Manifesto reveal that the church's movement away from polygamy was an incremental process rather than an abrupt turnaround. Smith wrote to one of his plural wives that the Manifesto would not affect their marriage at all, but simply prevented those who had not yet entered into plural marriages from doing so.

Smith felt it was important for Utah to become a state, and thereby eliminate the ongoing federal supervision of Utah Territory. Following Woodruff's official discontinuance of new plural marriages in 1890 and the dissolution of the Mormon People's Party in 1891, Smith championed the anti-polygamy Republican Party in Utah.

In September 1891, Smith received a presidential pardon from U.S. President Benjamin Harrison in relation to Smith's practice of plural marriage.

== LDS Church President ==
Joseph F. Smith in 1891.

After the death of church president Lorenzo Snow, Smith was chosen by the apostles of the church as Snow's successor. Smith was set apart as President of the Church on October 17, 1901, with Presiding Patriarch John Smith acting as voice. This action was ratified by a special conference and solemn assembly of the priesthood on November 10, 1901. He chose John R. Winder and Anthon H. Lund as his counselors. After Winder died, Lund became the first counselor and Smith's second cousin, John Henry Smith, became the second counselor.

=== Polygamy issues ===
One of the first issues Smith faced was the ongoing difficulties for the church due to the continuing practice of plural marriage. Smith supported apostle Reed Smoot's candidacy for the U.S. Senate, but Smoot's election was contested on the grounds that he was an officer in a church which continued to countenance polygamous marriages. The Senate investigation again focused national attention on Mormon marriages and political influence. Additional attention was given to Smith because of his opposition to the election and re-election of Utah's senior U.S. Senator, non-Mormon Thomas Kearns. Following his appearance before a Senate panel in 1904, Smith took steps to prevent any surreptitious addition of new plural marriages within the church. On April 6, 1904, Smith issued an order and declaration in the general conference of the church, popularly referred to as the "second manifesto", and declared that any church officer who performed a plural marriage, as well as the offending couple, would be excommunicated. He clarified that the church's policy against new plural marriages applied worldwide, and not just in the United States. Two members of the Quorum of the Twelve, John W. Taylor and Matthias F. Cowley, resigned in 1905 following these announcements. Smith continued to live with his five plural wives as did other Mormon polygamists. In 1906, Smith was brought to trial on a charge of unlawful cohabitation with four women in addition to his lawful wife; he pleaded guilty and was fined $300, the maximum penalty then permitted under the law.

=== Other actions ===
Smith gave more influence to the Presiding Patriarch of the church than had any president since Joseph Smith. The church's presiding patriarch, John Smith, was his elder half-brother. During his presidency, Smith apparently pushed to change the order in which church leaders were sustained in general conferences. He intended to have the presiding patriarch sustained before even himself (as president of the church), consistent with his interpretation of Doctrine and Covenants Section 124 and early historical precedent. This met with opposition from the other apostles, and the proposal was not realized.

In 1906, Smith went on a tour to Europe, becoming the first LDS Church president to travel outside of North America during his presidential tenure.

In 1908, Smith organized a committee to standardize and reform the Aaronic Priesthood quorums. This committee standardized the age requirements for young men to be ordained to the office of Teacher or Priest.

Smith's seventeen-year presidential administration made efforts toward improving the church's damaged relationships with the federal government and related issues dealing with the church's financial situation. The administration acquired historic sites, constructed numerous meetinghouses, and expanded the church system of educational academies and universities. He also oversaw a continued growth in church membership.

During Smith's presidential tenure, the LDS Church constructed and dedicated the Joseph Smith Birthplace Memorial near South Royalton, Vermont. It was dedicated by Smith on December 23, 1905, the 100th anniversary of Joseph Smith's birth. Also during Smith's presidency, the Seagull Monument at Temple Square in Salt Lake City was dedicated on October 1, 1913. In 1913, Boy Scouting became the official youth activity program for the church's young men. During much of his presidential tenure, Smith oversaw the planning and construction of the Hawaiian Temple in Laie, Hawaii, one of his part-time residences.

=== Death ===
Smith died of pneumonia resulting from pleurisy in Salt Lake City on November 19, 1918, and was succeeded by Heber J. Grant. Due to the widespread influenza pandemic of 1918–20, a graveside service was held, rather than a public funeral. Smith was interred in the Salt Lake City Cemetery on November 22, 1918.

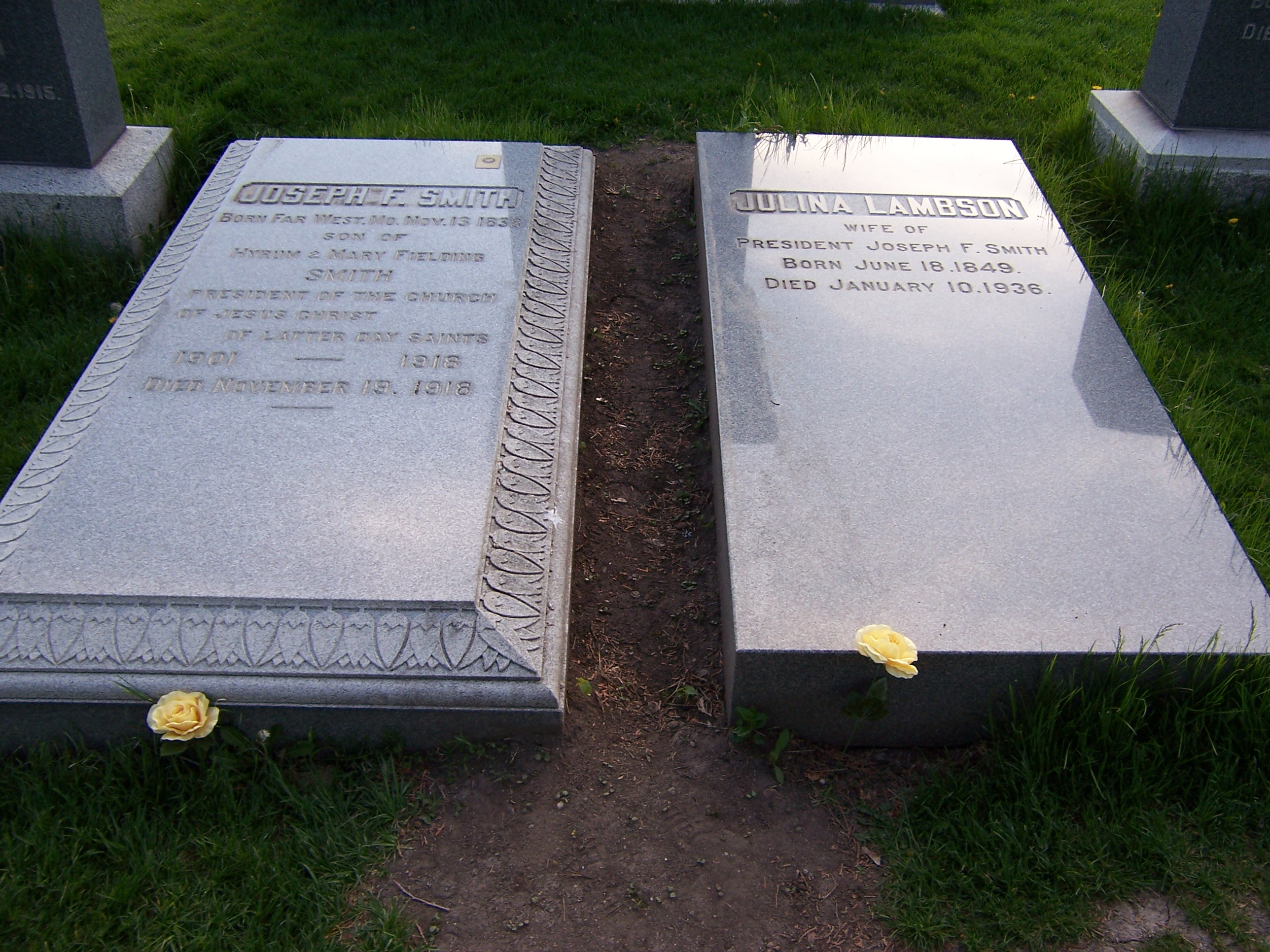
Grave marker of Joseph F. Smith, and Julina Lambson Smith, one of his wives

== Doctrinal contributions ==
During his administration as president of the church, Smith made significant official statements of church doctrine:

- "The Origin of Man": In November 1909, in the midst of public interest in theories of evolution, the First Presidency issued a statement that affirmed that God created man in his own image. The document also succinctly reiterates the Mormon doctrine of a twofold creation (spiritual followed by temporal), the premortal existence of man, and ends noting that man, as a child of God, is capable of evolving into a god.
- "The Father and the Son": On June 20, 1916, the First Presidency and the Quorum of the Twelve Apostles issued a statement examining the Mormon use of the term "Father" in scripture, clarifying times when the word refers to God the Father and when the word refers to Jesus Christ. The statement identified four different uses of the word "Father." God the Father is the literal parent of the spirits of mankind and the earthly father of Jesus Christ. Jesus Christ is referred to as "the Father" when discussing his role as creator of the earth, when he acts as "the Father" of those who abide in his gospel, and when he acts with the authority of his Heavenly Father while on earth.
- "Vision of the Redemption of the Dead": On October 3, 1918, Smith received a revelation on the nature of the spirit world and on Jesus Christ's role in ensuring that the gospel is taught to all men, living and dead. A written account of the revelation was submitted to the general authorities of the church on October 31, 1918, and was unanimously accepted. The revelation was initially published in December 1918, and was added to the Pearl of Great Price, one of the church's scriptural standard works, in April 1976; it has since been removed from the Pearl of Great Price and added to the Doctrine and Covenants as section 138. This revelation complemented an 1894 statement on the eternal nature of the family and appropriate temple work for the dead issued by Woodruff. Genealogy work by members of the LDS Church increased after both of these statements.

Funded by Lorenzo N. Stohl, the sermons and writings of Smith were compiled by John A. Widtsoe, Osborne J. P. Widtsoe, Albert E. Bowen, Franklin S. Harris, and Joseph Quinney. In 1919, the Committee on Study for the Priesthood Quorums of the LDS Church had this work published as the book Gospel Doctrine, for use as instruction for Melchizedek priesthood quorums of the church.

Smith's teachings as an apostle were the 2000–01 course of study in the LDS Church's Sunday Relief Society and Melchizedek priesthood classes.

== Works ==
- Smith, Joseph F. (1981). Hyrum M. Smith III and Scott G. Kenney. (ed.). From Prophet to Sons: Advice from Joseph F. Smith to His Missionary Sons. Deseret Book Company.
- Smith, Joseph F. (1919). Gospel Doctrine: Selections from the Sermons and Writings of Joseph F. Smith. Deseret News Press.
- Smith, Joseph F. (1998). Teachings of Presidents of the Church: Joseph F. Smith. LDS Church. LDS Church publication number 35744.

== See also ==
- Parley Parker Christensen, Salt Lake County clerk, delayed prosecution of Smith.

== Notes ==
The Church of Jesus Christ of Latter-day Saints titles
Preceded by Lorenzo Snow	President of the Church; October 17, 1901 – November 19, 1918	Succeeded by Heber J. Grant
Preceded by Brigham Young Jr.	President of the Quorum of the Twelve Apostles; October 10, 1901 – October 17, 1901	Succeeded by Brigham Young Jr.
Preceded by George Q. Cannon	First Counselor in the First Presidency; October 6, 1901 – October 10, 1901	Succeeded by John R. Winder
Preceded by Daniel H. Wells	Second Counselor in the First Presidency; April 7, 1889 – October 6, 1901	Succeeded by Rudger Clawson
Preceded by George Q. Cannon	Quorum of the Twelve Apostles; July 1, 1866 – October 17, 1901	Succeeded by Brigham Young Jr.
Preceded by Lorenzo Snow	Superintendent of the Young Men's Mutual Improvement Association; 1901–1918	Succeeded by Anthony W. Ivins
