= William Fowler (Mormon) =

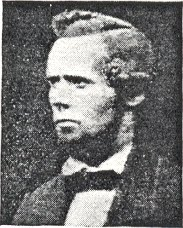

Personal details
- Born: May 9, 1830; Australia
- Died: August 25, 1865 (aged 35); Utah, United States
- Resting place: Manti City Cemetery; 39.276°N 111.633°W
- Title: Church of Jesus Christ of Latter-day Saints hymn writer
- Spouse(s): Ellen Bradshaw
- Children: Harriet Adeline Fowler; Henry Ammon Fowler; Florence Ellen Fowler
- Parents: John Fowler; Bridget Niel

William Fowler (May 9, 1830 – August 25, 1865) was the author of the popular Latter-day Saint hymn "We Thank Thee, O God, for a Prophet".

Fowler was born in Australia to an English father, John Fowler, and an Irish mother, Bridget Niel. His father was in the British military, and when Fowler was three his father was relocated to India. When William was nine his father was honorably discharged from the army and the family moved to Sheffield, John Fowler's birthplace.

Two years after the move to England, John Fowler died, and less than four years later Bridget Fowler also died. Bridget had been raised in the Roman Catholic faith, but had joined the Wesleyan Methodist religion, as had John Fowler, who was originally an Anglican.

William Fowler was introduced to the Church of Jesus Christ of Latter-day Saints (LDS Church) by Peter Poulucci, and he was baptized by J. V. Long in 1849. After being baptized, Fowler was fired from the factory in Sheffield where he had worked as a cutler.

Fowler and his wife Ellen Bradshaw had three children, Harriet Adeline Fowler (1856–1944), Henry Ammon Fowler (1857–1941), and Florence Ellen Fowler (1860–1946).

From 1850 to 1854 Fowler served as a missionary in England for the LDS Church.

Fowler wrote "We Thank Thee, O God, for a Prophet" sometime between 1860 and 1863. He emigrated to Utah Territory in 1863 and settled in Manti, Utah, where he was a schoolteacher. He died in Manti at the age of 35, and the LDS Church later erected a monument there in his honor.
