= Duloe, Bedfordshire =

Hamlet in Bedfordshire, England

Coordinates: 52.2303°N 0.3080°W

Duloe
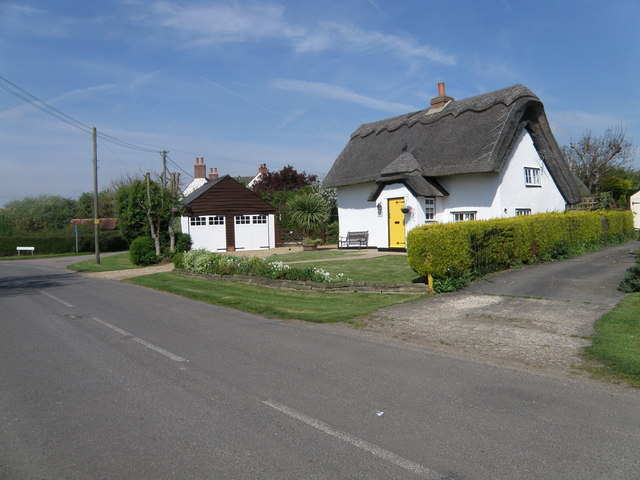

- Location within Bedfordshire
- OS grid reference: TL157607
- Civil parish: Staploe
- Unitary authority: Bedford
- Ceremonial county: Bedfordshire
- Region: East
- Country: England
- Sovereign state: United Kingdom
- Post town: ST NEOTS
- Postcode district: PE19
- Dialling code: 01480
- Police: Bedfordshire
- Fire: Bedfordshire
- Ambulance: East of England
- UK Parliament: North Bedfordshire

Duloe is a hamlet in the English county of Bedfordshire.

A former spelling of the name may be "Devylho" or "Deuylho", as seen in a 1460 legal record.

Administratively it is part of the civil parish of Staploe that, in turn, forms part of the Borough of Bedford. The nearest town is St Neots two miles to the east over the border into Cambridgeshire.
