= Hyrum Smith =

American Mormon leader (1800–1844)

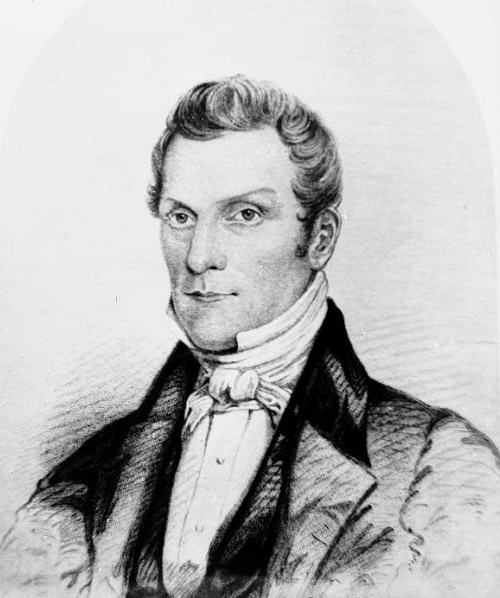

Assistant President of the Church
- January 24, 1841 – June 27, 1844
- Called by: Joseph Smith

Latter Day Saint Apostle
- January 24, 1841 – June 27, 1844
- Called by: Joseph Smith
- Reason: Excommunication of Oliver Cowdery
- Reorganization at end of term: No apostles ordained

2nd Presiding Patriarch
- September 14, 1840 – June 27, 1844
- Called by: Joseph Smith

Second Counselor in the First Presidency
- November 7, 1837 – January 24, 1841
- Called by: Joseph Smith
- End reason: Called as Assistant President of the Church

Assistant Counselor in the First Presidency
- September 3, 1837 – November 7, 1837
- Called by: Joseph Smith
- End reason: Called as Second Counselor in the First Presidency

Personal details
- Born: February 9, 1800; Tunbridge, Vermont, United States
- Died: June 27, 1844 (aged 44); Carthage, Illinois, United States
- Cause of death: Gunshot wound
- Resting place: Smith Family Cemetery; 40°32′25.98″N 91°23′31.06″W
- Spouse(s): Jerusha Barden; Mary F. Smith; Mercy F. Thompson
- Children: 8
- Parents: Joseph Smith Sr. Lucy Mack Smith

Hyrum Smith (February 9, 1800 – June 27, 1844) was an American religious leader in the Church of Jesus Christ of Latter Day Saints, the original church of the Latter Day Saint movement. He was the older brother of the movement's founder, Joseph Smith, and was killed with his brother at Carthage Jail where they were being held awaiting trial.

== Early life ==
Hyrum Smith was born in Tunbridge, Vermont, the second son of Joseph Smith Sr. and Lucy Mack Smith.

Between the ages of 12 and 15, Smith briefly attended Moor's Charity School on the campus of Dartmouth College while his family lived in nearby Lebanon, New Hampshire.

== Church service ==
Smith was a close advisor and confidant to his brother Joseph as the latter produced the Book of Mormon and established the Church of Christ. In June 1829, Smith was baptized in Seneca Lake, New York. He was one of the Eight Witnesses who swore to the reality of a set of golden plates inscribed with the Book of Mormon. He also said he saw the angel Moroni. When the Church of Christ was organized on April 6, 1830, six men signed their names as charter members; at the age of 30, Hyrum Smith was the oldest of the six. Smith served as presiding officer of a church branch in Colesville, New York, and was one of the first Latter Day Saint missionaries in the surrounding area.

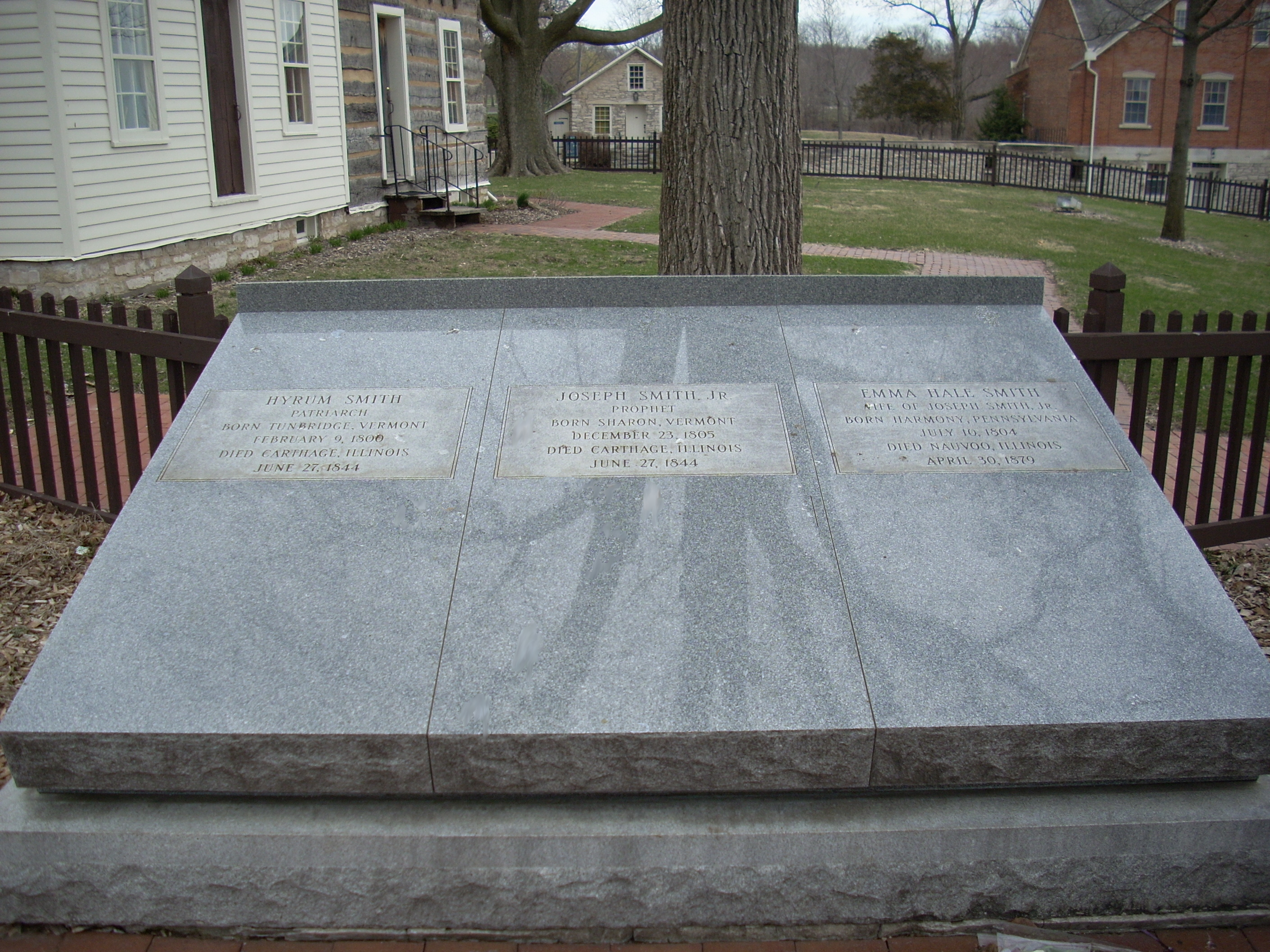
Grave of Joseph, Emma, and Hyrum Smith

As the church headquarters and membership moved west, Smith and his family relocated. In 1831, he established a home in Kirtland, Ohio. During his residence there, he served as foreman of the quarry providing stone for the Kirtland Temple. Between 1831 and 1833, he served proselyting missions to Missouri and Ohio. In 1834, under the direction of Joseph Smith, he recruited members for a militia, Zion's Camp, and traveled with the group to the aid of the Latter Day Saints in Missouri. He was appointed Second Counselor in the church's First Presidency in November 1837. In 1838 and 1839, Hyrum, Joseph and three other church leaders shared a jail cell in Liberty, Missouri, while awaiting trial.

After relocating to Nauvoo, Illinois, Smith became the church's Presiding Patriarch, a position first held by his father, Joseph Smith Sr. He also replaced Oliver Cowdery as Assistant President of the Church; in this capacity, Smith acted as President of the Church in Joseph's absence and was designated to be Joseph's successor if he were killed or incapacitated. Although Hyrum Smith was never explicitly ordained to the priesthood office of apostle, "his appointment as assistant president may have included such authority".

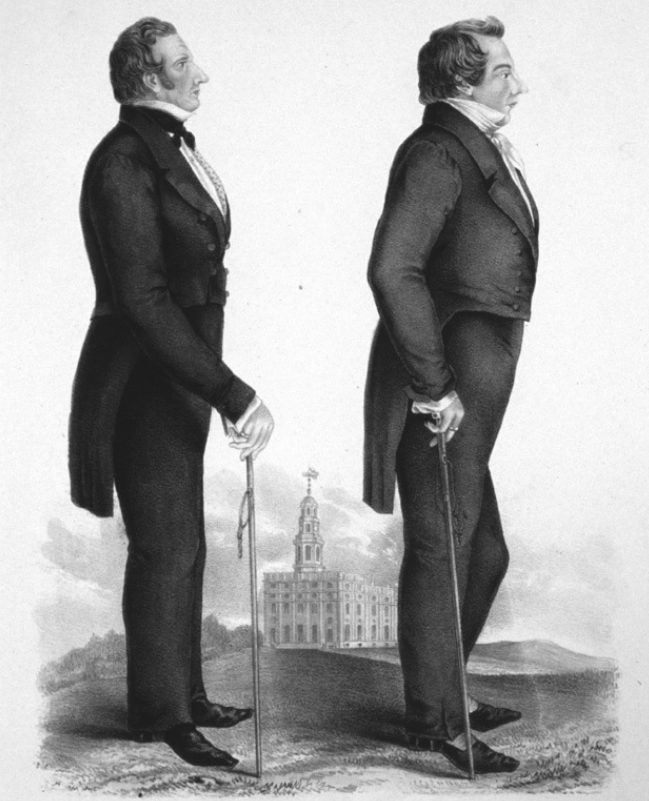
Hyrum (left) with brother Joseph (right) in the 1840s.

When warned of possible danger, Joseph urged Hyrum Smith and his family to flee to Cincinnati, Ohio. Hyrum refused and, in 1844, traveled with Joseph to Carthage, Illinois, where both were charged with riot and treason. Joseph, Hyrum, John Taylor and Willard Richards were held awaiting trial in a jail in Carthage. On June 27, 1844, the building was attacked by a mob of between sixty and two hundred men. While attempting to barricade the door to prevent the mob from entering, Hyrum was shot in the face on the left side of the nose. After staggering back, another ball fired through the window struck him in the back, passed through his body, and struck his watch in his vest pocket. As Hyrum Smith fell to the floor, he exclaimed, "I am a dead man," as he died. Taylor was struck by several bullets but survived with the help of Richards. Joseph was hit by at least two shots, exclaimed "O Lord, My God," and fell through a second-story window to the ground where he was shot again.

Because of his position as Assistant President of the Church, it is likely that Smith would have succeeded Joseph and become the next president of the church had he outlived his brother.

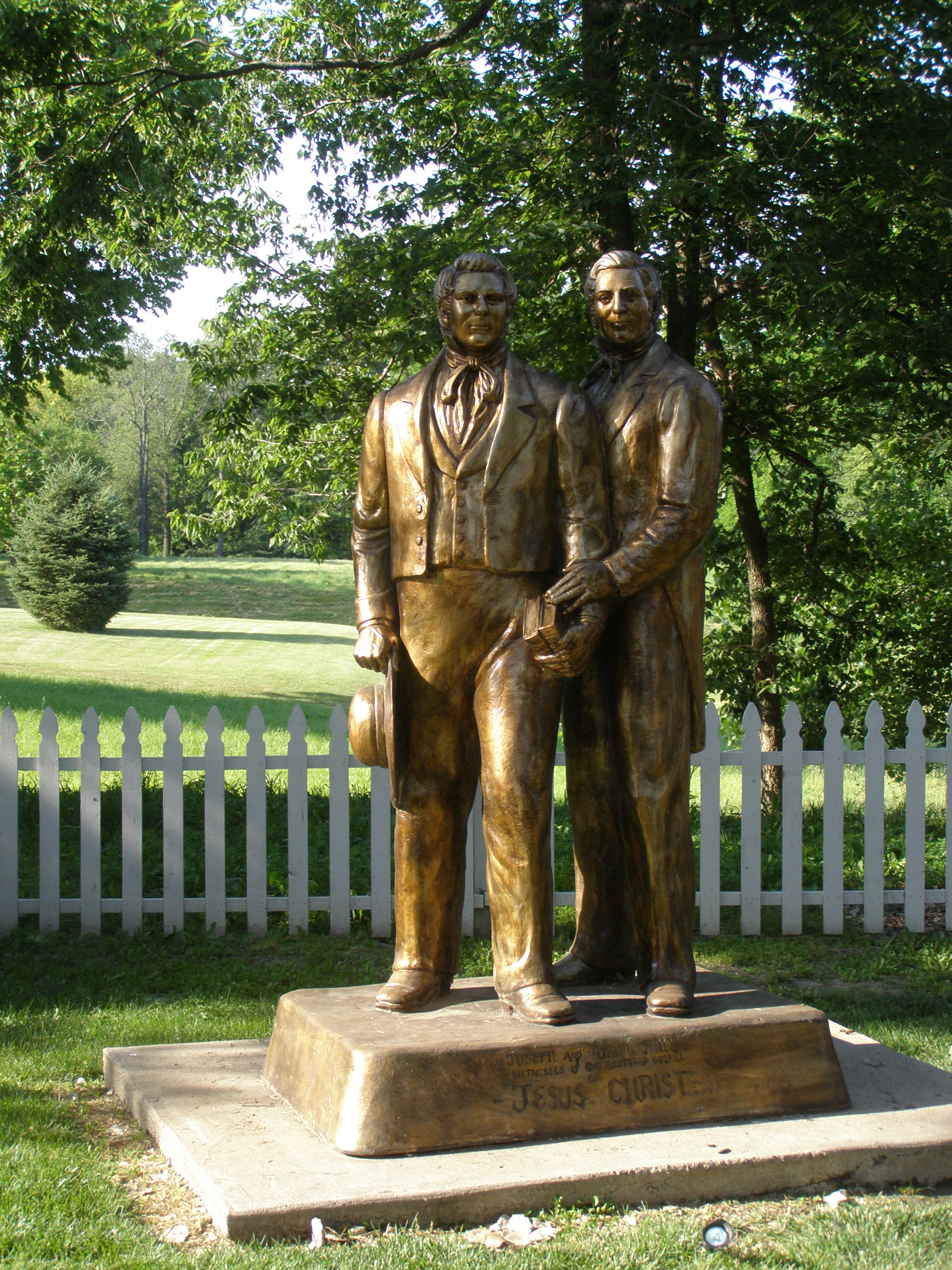
Statue of Joseph and Hyrum Smith in Nauvoo, Illinois

== Political involvement ==
Smith was a member of the Nauvoo City Council. At the time of his death, Smith was an independent candidate for the Illinois state legislature.

== Wives and children ==
On 2 November 1826, in Manchester, New York, he married Jerusha Barden (1805–1837). They had six children together.

- Lovina Smith (16 September 1827 – 8 October 1876), who married Lorin Walker
- Mary Smith (27 June 1829 – 29 May 1832)
- John Smith (22 September 1832 – 6 November 1911)
- Hyrum Smith (27 April 1834 – 21 September 1841)
- Jerusha Smith (13 January 1836 – 27 June 1912)
- Sarah Smith (2 October 1837 – 6 November 1876), who married Charles Emerson Griffin

On 24 December 1837, in Kirtland, Ohio, he married Mary Fielding Smith (1801–1852). They had two children.

- Joseph F. Smith (13 November 1838 – 19 November 1918)
- Martha Ann Smith (14 May 1841 – 19 October 1923)

In August 1843, he married to two plural wives: Mercy Fielding Thompson, widow of Robert B. Thompson and sister to Hyrum's wife Mary; and Catherine Phillips.

== Descendants ==
Smith's descendants have played significant roles in the history of the Church of Jesus Christ of Latter-day Saints (LDS Church). Joseph F. Smith, his son by Mary Fielding Smith, served as LDS Church president from 1901 to 1918. His grandson, Joseph Fielding Smith also served as president of the church from 1970 to 1972. His eldest son, John Smith, served as the church's Presiding Patriarch from 1855 to 1911. John Smith's descendants held this post from 1912 to 1932 and from 1942 to 1979, when the office was effectively discontinued and the incumbent, Eldred G. Smith, was given the title patriarch emeritus. M. Russell Ballard, who was the Acting President of the Quorum of the Twelve Apostles of the LDS Church, was also a direct descendant of Smith.

In 1918, Smith's descendants erected a monument to him in the Salt Lake City Cemetery.

In 2000, it was estimated that Smith had over 31,000 living descendants.

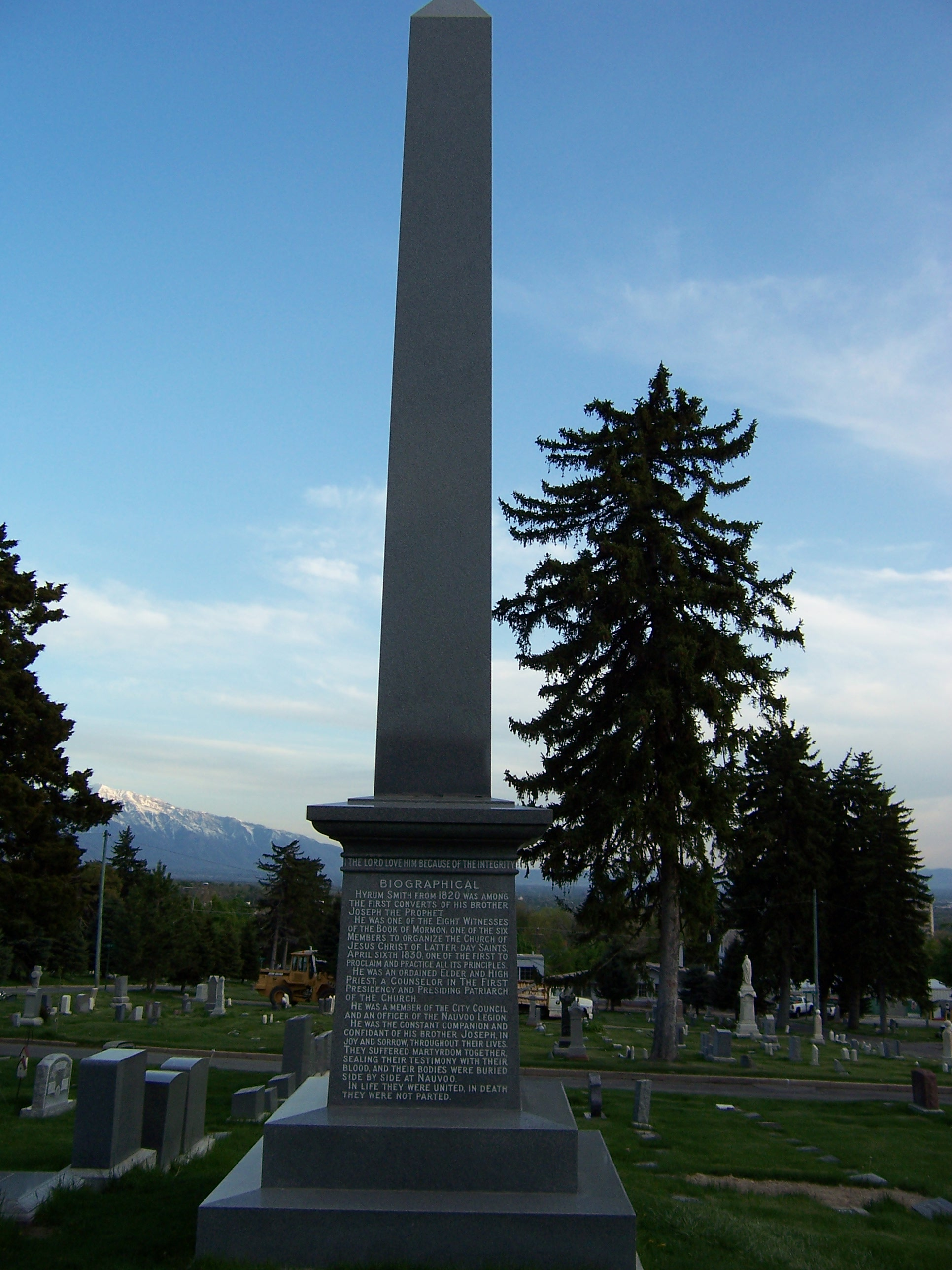

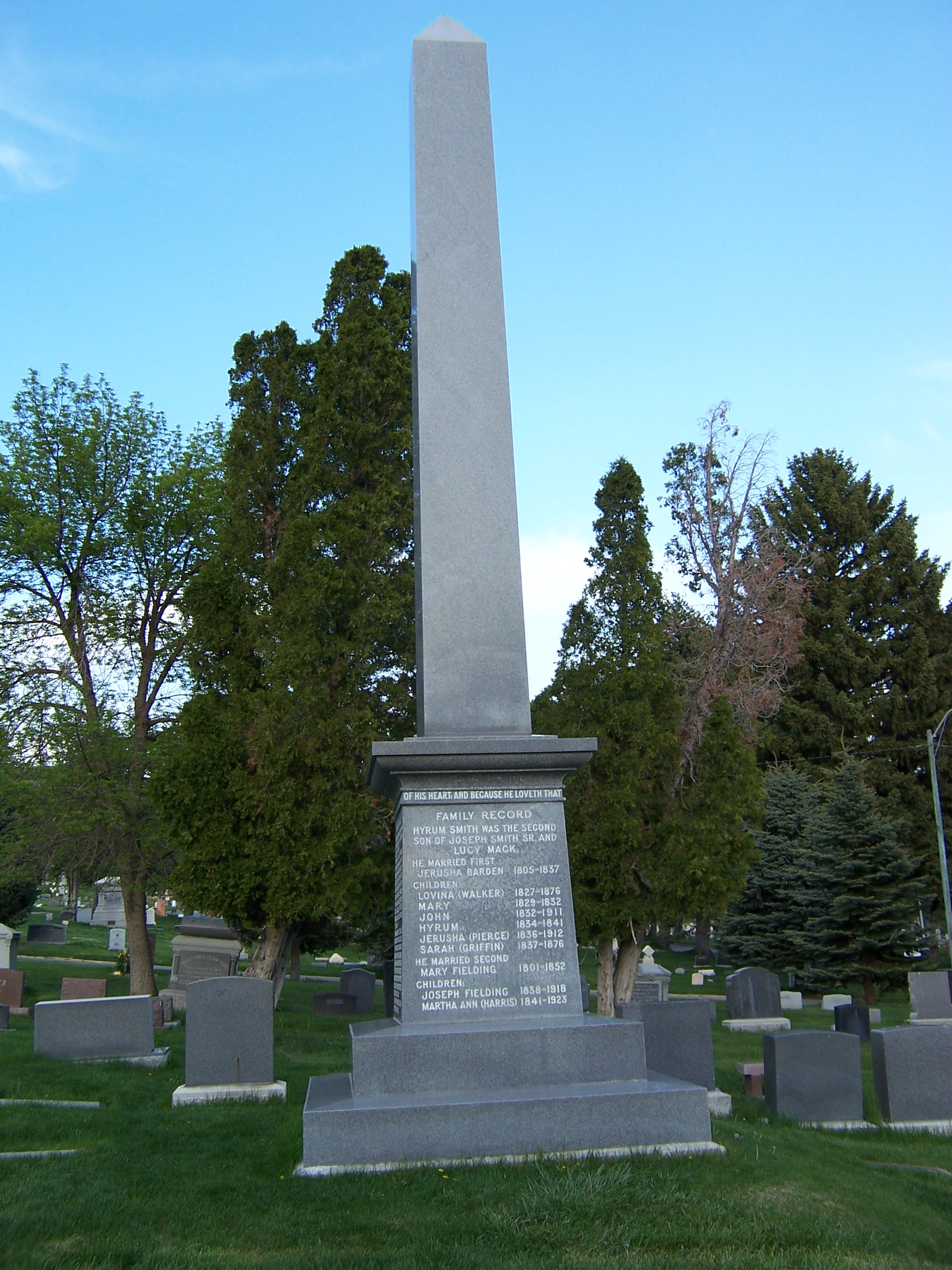

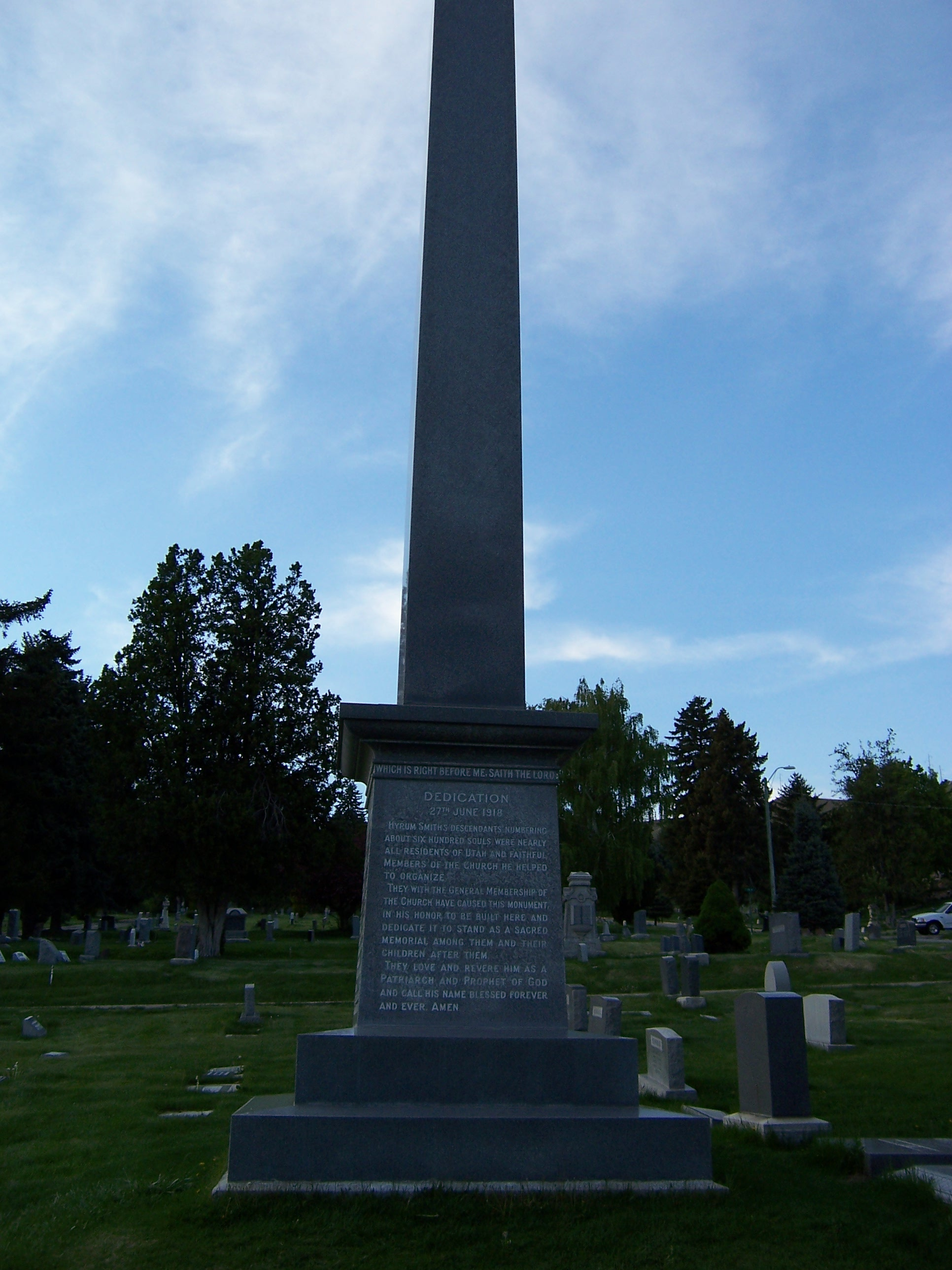

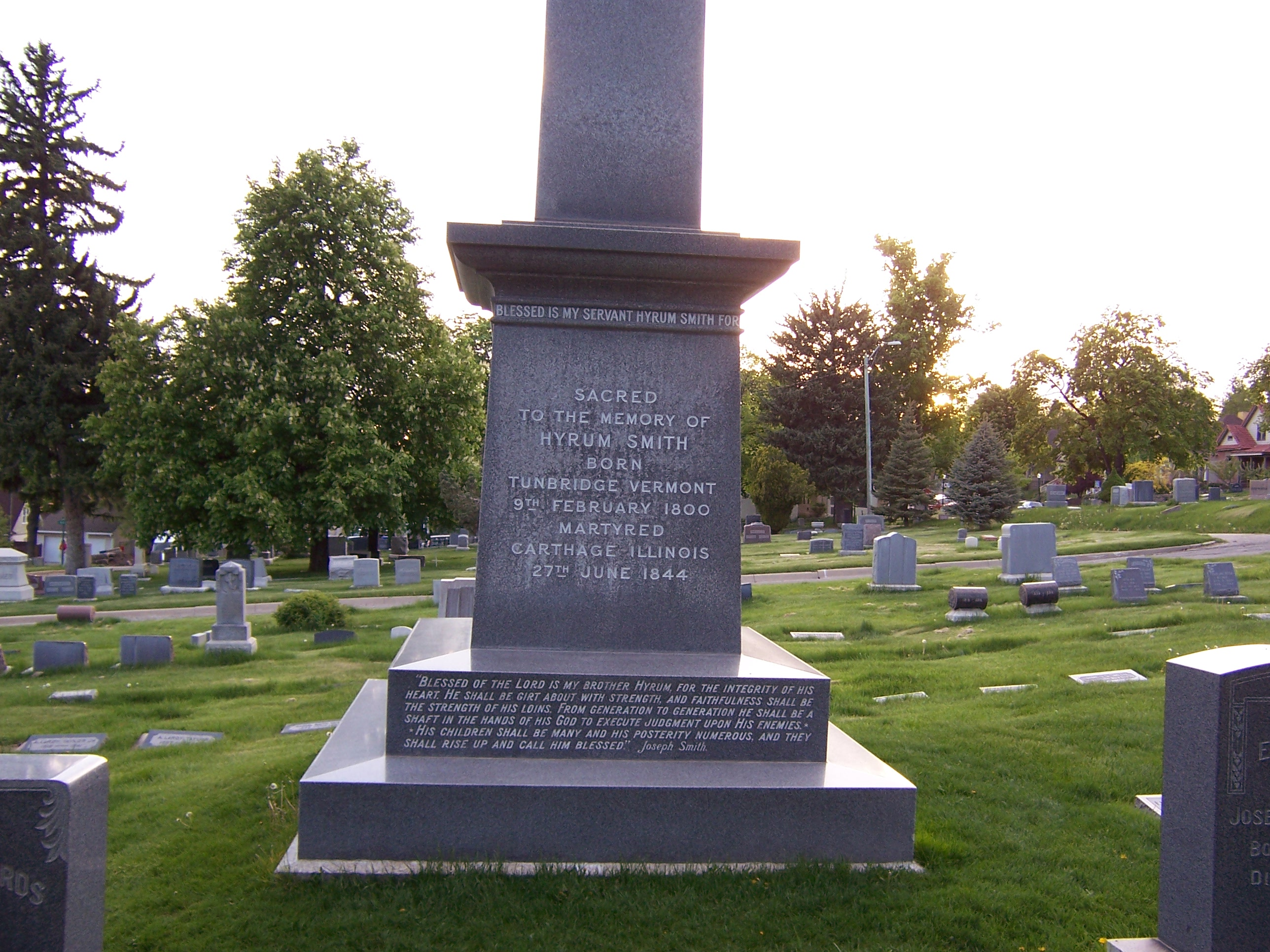

== See also ==
- Latter Day Saint martyrs

== Notes ==
Church of Jesus Christ of Latter Day Saints titles
| Preceded by Joseph Smith Sr. | Presiding Patriarch; September 14, 1840 – June 27, 1844 | Succeeded by William Smith |
| Preceded by Oliver Cowdery | Assistant President of the Church; January 24, 1841 – June 27, 1844; With: Possibly John C. Bennett; April 8, 1841 – May 25, 1842 | Position discontinued |
Church of the Latter Day Saints titles Later renamed: Church of Jesus Christ of Latter Day Saints (1838)
| Preceded by Frederick G. Williams | Second Counselor in the First Presidency; November 7, 1837 – January 24, 1841 | Succeeded by William Law |
| First | Assistant Counselor in the First Presidency; September 3, 1837–November 7, 1837; With: Oliver Cowdery; John Smith; Joseph Smith Sr. | Succeeded by Oliver Cowdery; Joseph Smith Sr. John Smith |
