= History of the Relief Society =

History of the Women's organization in the Latter Day Saint movement

Emmeline B. Wells (center) with Elizabeth Ann Whitney (left) and Eliza R. Snow (right). Early leaders of the Relief Society.

The history of the organization known as the Relief Society in the Latter Day Saint movement began on March 17, 1842, and continues to this day.

== 1842 Organization in Nauvoo ==
=== Original idea ===
In the spring of 1842 Sarah Granger Kimball and her seamstress, Margaret A. Cook, discussed sewing shirts for construction workers of the Nauvoo Temple. According to Kimball, "She desired to be helpful but had no means to furnish. I told her I would furnish material if she would make some shirts for the workmen."

=== First meetings and initial organization in the Kimball parlor ===
As the project grew, Cook and Kimball invited friends and neighbors to participate, meeting in Kimball's home. The Cooke-Kimball group soon discussed creating an official Ladies' Society to meet the needs of expansion, with elected officers and established procedure. At a March 4, 1842 meeting in Kimball's parlor, the women decided to establish a formal set of rules for their new organization. Eliza R. Snow was selected to write a constitution and by-laws for the society.

==== Influence of Joseph Smith ====
Upon reviewing Snow's constitution and by-laws, Joseph Smith called them "the best he had ever seen" but said, "this is not what you want. Tell the sisters their offering is accepted of the Lord, and He has something better for them than a written constitution. ... I will organize the women. .. after a pattern of the priesthood."

At the meeting in the Red Brick Store, Joseph Smith presented his wife Emma to be chosen as president. He stated Emma had already been ordained to the office twelve years earlier, when she was given the title "elect lady" in a blessing that later became canonized as Doctrine and Covenants 25. He also donated a five dollar gold piece. Throughout 1842 Joseph Smith attended nine meetings and gave six sermons.

=== First meeting and reorganization in the Red Brick Store ===
Twenty Latter Day Saint women gathered on Thursday, March 17, 1842, in the second-story meeting room over Smith's Red Brick Store in Nauvoo to discuss the formation of a Ladies' Society with Smith, John Taylor, and Willard Richards. Smith, Taylor, and Richards sat on the platform at the upper end of the room with the women facing them. "The Spirit of God Like a Fire Is Burning" was sung, and Taylor opened the meeting with prayer. The women present were Emma Hale Smith, Sarah M. Cleveland, Phebe Ann Hawkes, Elizabeth Jones, Sophia Packard, Philinda Merrick, Martha McBride Knight, Desdemona Fulmer, Elizabeth Ann Whitney, Leonora Taylor, Bathsheba W. Smith, Phebe M. Wheeler, Elvira A. Coles (Cowles; later Elivira A. C. Holmes), Margaret A. Cook, Athalia Robinson, Sarah Granger Kimball, Eliza R. Snow, Sophia Robinson, Nancy Rigdon and Sophia R. Marks.

==== Organizing the Society's members, officers, and procedure at the First Meeting ====
The women present were proposed as the initial members and the men withdrew as the motion to accept all present was considered. The motion was passed and the men returned. Then another seven names were proposed by Joseph Smith for admission. They were: Sarah Higbee, Thirza Cahoon, Keziah A. Morrison, Marinda N. Hyde, Abigail Allred, Mary Snider, and Sarah S. Granger. The men again withdrew as the women considered and passed the motion. Smith then proposed the society elect a presiding officer and allow that officer to choose two counselors to aid her. They would be ordained and would preside over the society. In the place of a constitution the presidency would preside and all their decisions should be considered law and acted upon as such. At appropriate times, the body of the society should vote and the majority opinion of the sisters would be honored as law. The minutes of the meetings would serve as an additional guide to their governance. Whitney motioned and it was seconded that Emma Smith be chosen president and this passed unanimously. Emma Smith then chose her two counselors, Cleveland and Whitney. At that time Taylor, who had been presiding over the meeting, vacated that honor to Smith and her counselors. The men then again withdrew as Smith chose a secretary and treasurer. The three members of the Presidency were then ordained and blessed by Taylor.

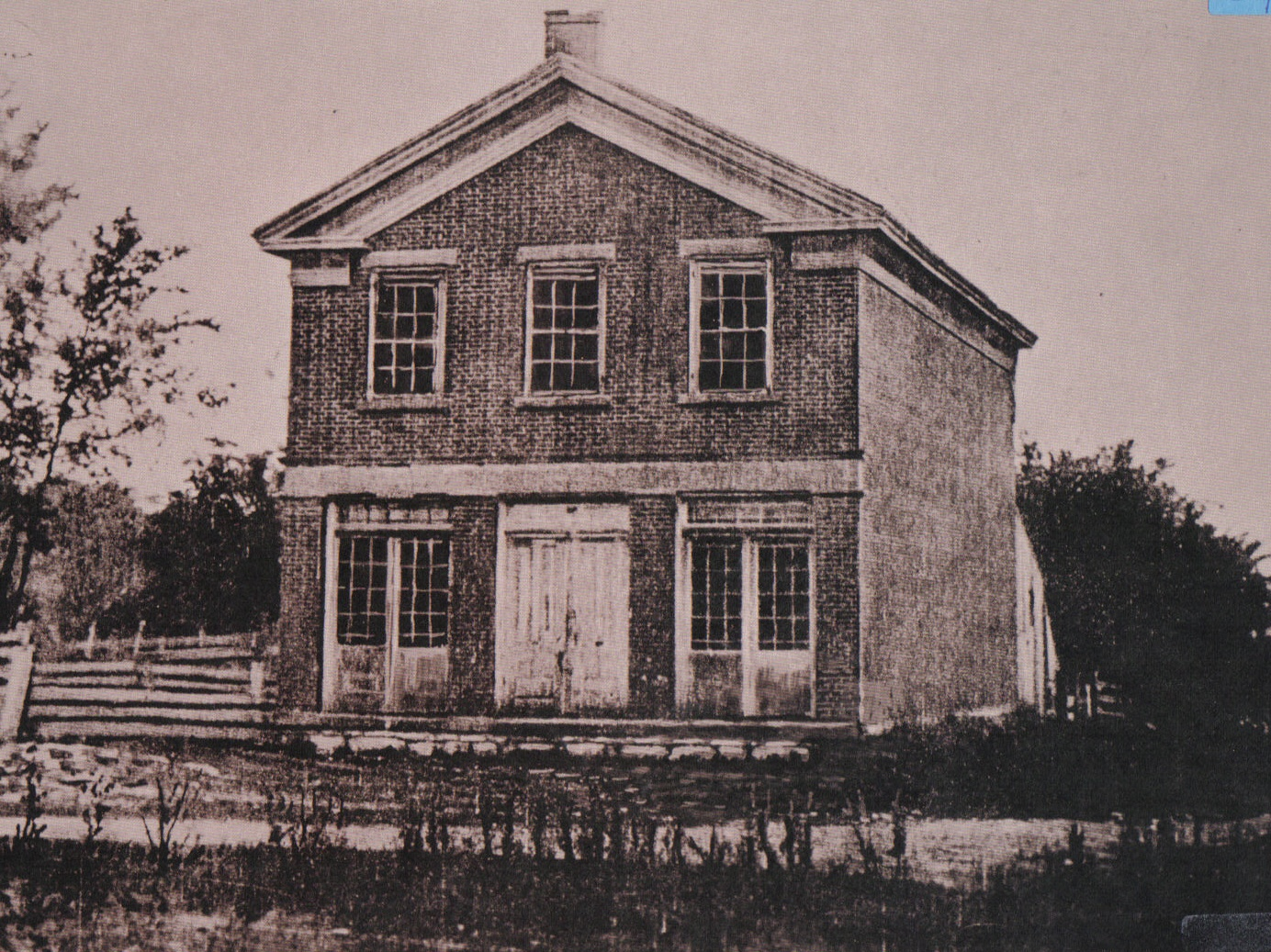
Red Brick Store where the Relief Society was organized

==== Connection to Freemasonry ====
The Relief Society was developed at the same time as the Nauvoo chapter of freemasons, and there are several connections between the two organizations. The March 17 meeting was held, at Joseph Smith's suggestion, in the newly established masonic lodge where he had been initiated to Master Mason on March 15 and 16. In the following weeks church leaders referred to the Relief Society members as masons, in reference to the women's ability to keep secrets. Other connections between the Relief Society organization and masonry include the implementation of a presidency of three, the practice of recommendation and unanimous voting before accepting new members, the presence of men at meetings throughout the first year, and the institutionalized secrecy through the passing of "keys" and knowledge of the mysteries of heaven. A masonic prayer was copied into the front of the minute book presented to the women by Willard Richards that read "O, Lord! Help our widows, and fatherless children! So mote it be. Amen. With the sword, and the word of truth, defend thou them. So mote it be. Amen." This was copied from the open Bible in the lodge where they met, another connection to masonry.

The covert communication patterns of masonry, such as code words and phrases known only to initiates, used within the context of Relief Society meetings allowed Joseph Smith to publicly oppose adultery while continuing polygamy with those who he had trusted with the practice. Some of these code phrases Joseph Smith and his friends used to refer to polygamy include, "the new and everlasting covenant of marriage" and calls to obey "every word that proceedeth out of the mouth of the Lord."

=== Established purpose of the society ===
A notice in the Times and Seasons stated, "A society has lately been formed by the ladies of Nauvoo for the relief of the poor, the destitute, the widow and the orphan; and for the exercise of all benevolent purposes."

Joseph Smith stated "the object of the Society—that the Society of Sisters might provoke the brethren to good works in looking to the wants of the poor—searching after objects of charity, and in administering to their wants—to assist; by correcting the morals and strengthening the virtues of the female community, and save the Elders the trouble of rebuking; that they may give their time to other duties, &c., in their public teaching."

Joseph Smith viewed the Relief Society as a way to grant ecclesiastical autonomy to women under his direction, to deputize women in policing morals, to stop gossip about his practice of plural marriage, and to experiment with future temple rites.

Emma Smith viewed the object of the society as being for charitable purposes. She used the organization as a way to exercise leadership and influence in the church. She worked to enforce high moral standards among the women, particularly in fighting polygamy.

The women of the Relief Society viewed the organization as a way to exercise their own spiritual power. Several of the members were secretly married to Joseph Smith.

According to Linda Hamilton, "The organization soon became a battleground for Emma and Joseph as she tried to expose those marrying her husband and he tried to control her knowledge of the practice."

=== Naming the society ===
It was proposed that the organization go by the name "Benevolent Society" and with no opposition the vote carried. However, Emma Smith made a point of objection. She convinced the attendees that the term "relief" would better reflect the purpose of the organization, for they were "going to do something extraordinary," distinct from the popular benevolent institutions of the day. After discussion, it was unanimously agreed that the fledgling organization be named "The Female Relief Society of Nauvoo". Joseph Smith then offered five dollars (worth $167 today) in gold to commence the funds of the Society. After the men left the room, Eliza R. Snow was unanimously elected as secretary of the Society with Phebe M. Wheeler as Assistant Secretary and Elvira A. Coles as Treasurer. Emma Smith remarked that "each member should be ambitious to do good" and seek out and relieve the distressed. Several female members then made donations to the Society. The men returned, and Taylor and Richards also made donations. After singing "Come Let Us Rejoice," the meeting was adjourned to meet on the following Thursday at 10 o'clock. Taylor then gave a closing prayer. Of his experience Joseph Smith recorded: "I attended by request, the Female Relief Society, whose object is the relief of the poor, the destitute, the widow and the orphan, and for the exercise of all benevolent purposes. ... [W]e feel convinced that with their concentrated efforts, the condition of the suffering poor, of the stranger and the fatherless will be ameliorated".

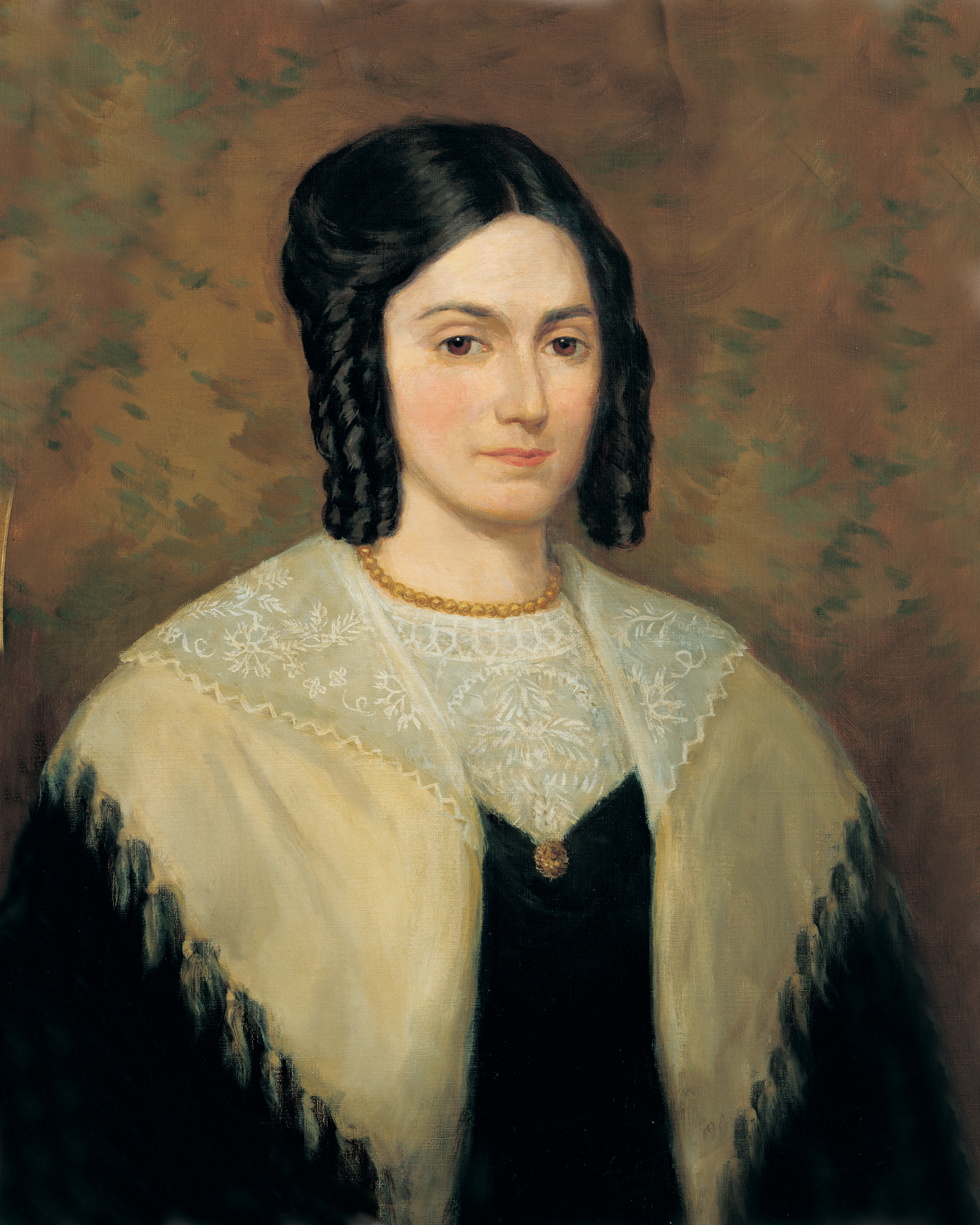
Emma Smith, wife of Joseph Smith, was the first General President of the Relief Society.

==== Calculation of Relief Society Age ====
Women continued to meet through the suspension, though not officially. When Brigham Young reinstated the Society in 1867, some women considered it a new organization, based on the old one. However, original Relief Society members such as Emmeline Wells felt that, "Sister Eliza R. Snow brought with her the records from Nauvoo which proves that this association was never discontinued since its first organization." The modern Relief Society annually celebrates the organization's "birthday" using the March 17, 1842 date.

== Nauvoo Relief Society Minute Book ==
Minutes of each Relief Society meeting were kept by Eliza R. Snow. Joseph Smith said, "The minutes of your meetings will be precedents for you to act upon—your Constitution and law."

=== Contents ===
The record includes minutes for 17 meetings in 1842, 13 meetings in 1843, and 4 meetings in 1844. The Relief Society did not hold meetings during the winter.

The names of 1,331 women are recorded in the minute books, including women from Canada, England, Ireland, Germany, Scotland, and Wales.

Donation records included in the Nauvoo Relief Society Minute Book include money, goods, and services. Food donations included apples, coffee, and rice. Goods included linens, quilts, soap, and candles. Some gave sewing supplies such as cotton flannel, thread, or flax, while others donated their sewing talents like knitting or weaving.

Other recorded donations were less conventional. Huldah Barrus donated shingles from the shingle mill she ran with her husband. Mrs. Durfee drove around a wagon to collect wool. The Relief Society helped Sister Hillman retrieve payment from employers who had refused to pay her.

The record book also records donations received by women at meetings, such as shoes or money for children's schooling. Women also networked at meetings, either expressing availability for employment or looking to fill positions.

=== Impact ===
The minute book became a foundational document in future attempts by women to organize and maintain their autonomy and authority.

Women who appear in the original meeting notes often became presidency members in Utah Relief Society branches when the organization was once again formally reestablished.

=== Possession of the Minute Book ===
Eliza R. Snow's original minute book was a foundational resource in re-establishing Relief Societies in 19th century Utah, and Snow frequently read from them as she taught.

The physical book itself was presented to the Relief Society by Willard Richards at the first meeting in the Red Brick Store. Eliza R. Snow, the primary scribe, retained possession of the book and carried it with her across the plains to Utah. When Snow died, the book was passed to her successor, Zina Diantha Huntington Young. The tradition continued as Bathsheba Smith gained possession of the minute book when she became the next Relief Society General President. When Bathsheba Smith died, the next president Emmeline B. Wells felt she should become the caretaker of the notes. However, church leaders including Joseph F. Smith felt the book should be placed in the church historian's office, and the Relief Society lost possession of the original notes. Emmeline B. Wells then relied on her own handwritten copy of the minutes to run the Relief Society and print excerpts in The Exponent.

==== Changes to minutes ====
In 1855, George A. Smith borrowed the original Nauvoo Relief Society Minute Book from Eliza R. Snow, as part of a larger project to print a history of the church in the Deseret News. Smith and his fellow scribes altered some of the text before publication. Derr et al. note that while some changes were minor, others appear to emphasize priesthood authority and order. Heber C. Kimball said of the alterations, "Heard Joseph's sermon Read, liked it better as revised." Brigham Young also approved of the changes. The same day, Young called for the preservation of key church documents in a fireproof safe; the Relief Society Minute Book was not selected to be included.

Examples of changes to Nauvoo Relief Society Minutes
| Original Relief Society Minute version | Reprinted Deseret News version |
|---|---|
| "…there could be no more sin in any female laying hands on the sick than in wetting the face with water." (April 28, 1842) | ...there could be no more sin in any female laying hands on and praying for the sick, than in wetting the face with water." (September 19, 1855) |
| "He spoke of delivering the keys to this Society and to the church—that according to his prayers God had appointed him elsewhere." (April 28, 1842) | "He spoke of delivering the keys of the Priesthood to the church, and said that the faithful members of the Relief Society should receive them in connection with their husbands, that the Saints whose integrity had been tried and proved faithful, might know how to ask the Lord and receive an answer; for according to his prayers, God had appointed him elsewhere." (September 19, 1855) |
| "This Society shall have power to command Queens in their midst." (April 28, 1842) | "If this Society listen to the council of the Almighty, through the heads of the church, they shall have power to command queens in their midst." (September 19, 1855) |
| "This Society is to get instruction thro' the order which God has established— thro' the medium of those appointed to lead" (April 28, 1842) | "You will receive instruction through the order of the Priesthood, which God has established, through the medium of those appointed to lead, guide, and direct the affairs of the church in this last dispensation" (September 19, 1855) |
| "And I now turn the key to you in the name of God" (April 28, 1842) | "And I now turn the key in your behalf in the name of the Lord" (September 19, 1855) |
| "Those ordain'd to lead the Society, are authoriz'd to appoint to different offices as the circumstances shall require." (April 28, 1842) | "Those ordained to preside over and lead you, are authorized to appoint to different offices as the circumstances shall require." (September 19, 1855) |

== Activities of the Female Relief Society of Nauvoo ==
Timeline of Nauvoo Relief Society meetings

The new organization was popular and grew so rapidly that finding a meeting place for such a large group proved difficult. Under Emma Smith's direction, the Society was "divided for the purpose of meeting" according to each of the city's four municipal wards. Smith and her counselors continued to preside over the groups. Visiting committees were appointed to determine needs in each ward. Young mother Sarah Pea Rich, wife of Charles C. Rich, recalled, "We then, as a people were united and were more like family than like strangers." By the time of its March 1844 suspension, membership totaled 1331 women.

The responsibility of conducting the Relief Society meetings in 1843 fell to Elizabeth Ann Whitney, as Sarah Cleveland moved away from Nauvoo and Emma Smith was largely absent from Nauvoo during that year.

=== 1842 Petition to Governor Thomas Carlin ===
In the summer of 1842, about 1,000 Relief Society members signed a petition asking the Illinois Governor Thomas Carlin to block the extradition of Joseph Smith to Missouri. Emma Smith, Eliza R. Snow, and Amanda Barnes met with Governor Carlin on July 28, 1842 and gave him the petition. Carlin issued a writ for Joseph Smith's arrest on August 2, prompting an exchange of four letters between Carlin and Emma Smith that month.

=== 1842 Statement on plural marriage ===
The October 1, 1842 issue of The Times and Seasons printed a statement signed by 19 Relief Society members denouncing plural marriage, specifically as practiced by John C. Bennett. It stated, "We the undersigned members of the ladies' relief society, and married females do certify and declare that we know of no system of marriage being practised in the church of Jesus Christ of Latter Day Saints save the one contained in the Book of Doctrine and Covenants, and we give this certificate to the public to show that J. C. Bennett's 'secret wife system' is a disclosure of his own make." At least three of the undersigned women had first-hand knowledge of Joseph Smith's polygamy, including Eliza R. Snow who had married Joseph the previous June.

=== Penny Subscription Drive and Boston Female Penny and Sewing Society ===
In 1843 Mercy Fielding Thompson and Mary Fielding Smith led women in a penny subscription drive to raise money for nails and glass for the construction of the Nauvoo Temple. According to Mercy Fielding Thompson she had a spiritual inspiration to get women to donate one penny a week. However, Hyrum Smith said in 1844 that "No member of the Female Relief Society got it up; I am the man that did it; they ought not to infringe upon it; I am not a member of the Female Relief Society; I am on of the committee of the Lord's House." Regardless of origin, the drive was carried out by Relief Society members, sanctioned by church leaders, and an article of the Latter-day Saints' Millennial Star encouraged latter day saint women in England to become involved The subscription drive lasted until the 1845 completion of the Nauvoo temple. The women raised about two thousand dollars from women throughout the United States and England.

In response to the penny subscription drive, church members in Boston organized the Boston Latter day Saint's Sewing and Penny Society on July 16, 1844, writing "The ladies of the Boston branch are determined not to be behind hand in assisting the rolling on of the cause of Christ." The name later changed to the Boston Female Penny and Sewing Society. Members were expected to donate one penny a week, and meet together once a month to sew. A similar organization in Lowell, Massachusetts formed with an additional intent to make clothing for travelling Elders. Derr et al. writes, "...these societies did not act as official branches of the Nauvoo Female Relief Society. Nevertheless, with their similar goals and strategies, they may have functioned like satellite Relief Societies in purpose."

In 1916, president Emmeline B. Wells took inspiration from the Nauvoo penny fund and established a similar fundraiser. In this effort Relief Society women raised more than $7,000 to buy supplies for the construction of temples in Canada and Hawaii.

Motif used by the Relief Society in the early 1900s.

== "The Voice of Innocence" and final meetings ==
"The Voice of Innocence" document was the central subject of the final official Nauvoo Relief Society meetings, and used by Emma Smith to denounce plural marriage.

=== Context ===
In February 1844, Orasmus F. Bostwick claimed privately to Joseph Smith that Hyrum Smith had multiple wives and that "he could take half a bushel of meal, and get what accommodation he wanted with almost any woman in the city." Joseph called Bostwick publicly to the mayor's court and fined him $50. The case placed the women at the center of public controversy. W.W. Phelps wrote "The Voice of Innocence" as a defense for the women against Bostwick's rumors. At a church meeting a week later, notice was given that the next Relief Society meeting would promote "The Voice of Innocence."

=== Content ===
"The Voice of Innocence" rejects Bostwick's rumors as lies and reaffirms that the virtue of women ought to be protected. It calls on the city to "kick the bloodthirsty pimp from the pale of social communion." It offers three resolutions: 1) to thank Joseph Smith for defending the innocence of women by holding Bostwick accountable for slander 2) to scorn any who dishonor the women of Nauvoo, and 3) to uphold monogamy, oppose John C. Bennett's spiritual wife system, and denounce "polygamy, bigamy, fornication, adultery, and prostitution."

=== Use in final four Relief Society Meetings ===
Petition from the Relief Society in Nauvoo around July 22, 1842 to Illinois Governor Thomas Carlin, asking he not allow extradition of Joseph Smith to Missouri. This petition was signed by a thousand Relief Society members.

Emma Smith returned to preside over Relief Society after an absence of nearly two years to endorse "The Voice of Innocence." It was the first Relief Society meeting of the 1844 year. To accommodate the number of women, the meeting was repeated with the same agenda once more that afternoon and twice the next Saturday, March 16.

After making a few changes to the document, Emma read "The Voice of Innocence" and held a vote that the women were "willing to receeve the princples of vurtue, keep the commandments of God, and uphold the Pres in puting down iniquity." Furthermore, she subtly encouraged the women to listen to Joseph's public condemnations of polygamy, rather than any private teachings on plural marriage.

At the March 16 meetings, another document was read alongside "The Voice of Innocence": An 1842 epistle signed by Joseph Smith and Brigham Young, condemning men who coerce women into spiritual wifery. Emma Smith grew stronger in her condemnation against polygamy with each successive meeting. In the last one, she stated "if there ever was any Authority on Earth she had it--and had it yet." They adjourned with the stated intention of finding a larger space for their next gathering, but the Nauvoo Relief Society never met again.

On March 20, Emma Smith's amended version of "The Voice of Innocence" was published in The Nauvoo Neighbor with a note that the document had been unanimously adopted by the Relief Society.

=== Consequences ===
Despite these and other public disavowals, Joseph Smith's rumored polygamy continued to generate criticism and threats of legal action. Joseph Smith said in a May 26, 1844 sermon that he "never had any fuss with these men until that Female Relief Society brought out the paper against adulterers and adulteresses."

Derr et al. state that "In pitting her authority against that of the prophet through whom her authority had come, and in planting disorder and disunity among the sisters, Emma Smith had erred egregiously" and connect the disbandment of the organization to Emma's private agenda to use the Relief Society to fight against polygamy.

== Suspension of meetings and disbandment ==
The last recorded meeting of the Relief Society in Nauvoo was held on March 16, 1844. Women continued to meet, though these were mostly groups outside of Nauvoo such as the Boston Penny and Sewing Society.

General Presidents of the Relief Society
| No. | Dates | Name |
|---|---|---|
| 1 | 1842–1844 | Emma Smith |
| 2 | 1866–1887 | Eliza R. Snow |
| 3 | 1888–1901 | Zina D. H. Young |
| 4 | 1901–1910 | Bathsheba W. Smith |
| 5 | 1910–1921 | Emmeline B. Wells |
| 6 | 1921–1928 | Clarissa S. Williams |
| 7 | 1928–1939 | Louise Y. Robison |
| 8 | 1940–1945 | Amy B. Lyman |
| 9 | 1945–1974 | Belle S. Spafford |
| 10 | 1974–1984 | Barbara B. Smith |
| 11 | 1984–1990 | Barbara W. Winder |
| 12 | 1990–1997 | Elaine L. Jack |
| 13 | 1997–2002 | Mary Ellen W. Smoot |
| 14 | 2002–2007 | Bonnie D. Parkin |
| 15 | 2007–2012 | Julie B. Beck |
| 16 | 2012–2017 | Linda K. Burton |
| 17 | 2017–2022 | Jean B. Bingham |
| 18 | 2022–present | Camille N. Johnson |

=== Reasons for suspension ===
Some of the proposed reasons for the suspension of Relief Society meetings include:

- Emma Smith said at the final meeting that she would call another when a "suitable place can be obtained."
- Joseph Smith suspended meetings because of conflict over polygamy. Emma had often used the Relief Society as a pulpit to express her opposition to plural marriage. However, several of the society's members and leaders were themselves secretly in plural marriages, including to Smith's own husband, who himself counseled the society against exposing iniquity.
- In 1868 Eliza R. Snow indicated that Emma Smith herself made the choice out of noble motivations, saying "Emma Smith gave it up so as not to lead the society in erro[r]."
- In 1880 John Taylor stated that the society was discontinued because Emma Smith opposed plural marriage, saying "Sister Emma got severely tried in her mind about the doctrine of Plural Marriage and she made use of the position she had to try to pervert the minds of the sisters in relation to that doctrine.
- Researchers such as Katie Ludlow Rich maintain that the women chose not to meet formally as an ecclesiastical society, but were not officially disbanded. The women continued to do Relief Society work such as caring for the poor and contributing to building the temple.

=== Reasons for disbandment ===
After the death of Joseph Smith in June 1844, Brigham Young assumed leadership of the majority of Latter Day Saints. On March 9, 1845 Brigham Young formally disbanded the Relief Society. Young told a meeting of men "When I want Sisters of the Wives of the members of the church to get up Relief Society I will summon them to my aid but until that time let them stay home."

Reasons proposed for this decision include:

- Young disagreed with how Emma used the Relief Society to oppose plural marriage.
- Brigham Young blamed the deaths of Joseph and Hyrum Smith on the dissension in the church caused by Emma Smith. He told a group of High Priests, "I will curse every man that lets his wife or daughters meet again--until I tell them--What are relief societies for? ...to relieve us of our best men--They relieved us of Joseph and Hyrum--that is what they will lead too--I don't [want] the advice or counsel of any woman--they would lead us down to hell."
- Young disbanded the organization after Emma rejected Brigham as her husband's successor.
- Young did not agree that the organization was sanctioned by Joseph: "...if you see Females huddling together veto the concern and if they say Joseph started it tell them it is a damned lie for I know he never encouraged it."
- Young said these words as part of an ongoing power struggle with Emma

== Moving West 1845-1848 ==
When Relief Society secretary Eliza R. Snow joined the Latter Day Saints in their exodus west in 1846, she carried the Relief Society Book of Records with her. Although they no longer met in an official capacity, women continued to assemble informally; the care and nurture of the needy continued without a formal Relief Society organization.

== Female Spiritual Meetings 1846-1850 ==
At Winter Quarters women gathered informally for both temporal and spiritual reasons. They met to visit, plan social events, barter, and help during illness, childbirth, and death. The winter of 1847 was a time of pentecostal revival for the saints. Women met several times a week in each other's cabins for female spiritual gatherings, sometimes called prayer meetings. Together they gave prayers, testimonies, blessings, and exercised spiritual gifts. The practice of glossolalia spread, particularly among the women. Newell K. Whitney visited a meeting and "admitted that at first he worried about the frequency of their meetings but changed his mind after entering the room and feeling the spirit that filled it." Although Brigham Young had banned women from gathering at this time, the women themselves felt it was their God-given right to exercise their spiritual gifts such as healing, prophecy, and speaking in tongues. Female spiritual meetings continued in wagons and tents as the saints travelled west toward Utah.

Upon arrival in the Salt Lake Valley in 1847, women continued to meet and perform healing rituals, though it was questioned whether women had the right to organize. It was easier for women, stationed at the fort, to hold female meetings, whereas the men were often away exploring, surveying, or gathering resources. Patty Sessions recorded going to five female meetings in one week. Rules of order began to form, such as who would preside over meetings. Presiding authority could be based on who ran the home they were meeting in, the order of arrival to the valley, the station of their husband, or proximity to an original member of the Nauvoo Relief Society. Without official protocol, sometimes the women would delegate their authority back and forth until someone officially opened the meeting. Even when men were present, they did not outrank the mistress of the household. The meetings began to be referred to as "organiz'd parties" or "organiz'd visits."

In December 1848, John Smith challenged the propriety of female organization. As the leading priesthood authority in the absence of Brigham Young, he did not want to sanction any unapproved practice. On December 27, he attended a female meeting to determine if the women acted appropriately. Other men, such as Levi Jackman felt the women did nothing wrong, saying "There was more intelligence in the hearts of the sis[ters] that aft[ernoon] than in the hearts of all the crown'd heads of Europe." Smith later declined an invitation to Patty Session's birthday party, feeling she was tricking him into attending a female meeting. On February 4, 1849, Sessions and Eliza R. Snow visited Smith, bringing doughnuts and a homemade cap, to explain it really had been an innocent party. A few days later Smith gave both women blessings. Women continued to meet, give healing blessings, and anoint and lay on hands.

As Saints established homes in the Salt Lake Valley and surrounding settlements, formal meetings for women gradually emerged. A Female Council of Health was established in 1851.

== Temporary relief societies 1854-1867 ==
Relief Society on the Catawba Indian Reservation around 1919.

On January 24, 1854, in response to Brigham Young's call to Saints to assist neighboring Native Americans, women from several Salt Lake City wards decided to organize "a society of females for the purpose of making clothing for Indian women and children." Two weeks later, on February 9, 1854, they formally organized an association remembered as the "Indian Relief Society." Matilda Dudley was elected president and treasurer, Mary Hawkins and Mary Bird as counselors, Louisa R. Taylor as secretary, and Amanda Barnes Smith as assistant secretary. Twelve other women were listed as charter members. Though the Latter-day Saint women were poor in material goods, they felt the need of Native Americans exceeded their own. Over the next four months, their efforts to clothe Indian women and children continued in earnest. In June 1854, Brigham Young encouraged women to form societies in their individual wards. Members of the first Indian Relief Society disbanded to help establish organizations in their own wards, many of them becoming leaders. Matilda Dudley, for example, became president of the Thirteenth Ward Relief Society with Augusta Cobb and Sarah A. Cook as her counselors and Martha Jane Coray as secretary. Records are limited but show that by 1858 over two dozen organizations had formed in some twelve Salt Lake City wards and in other outlying settlements such as Ogden, Provo, Spanish Fork, and Manti, Utah.

Each Relief Society operated independently within its ward in cooperation with the local bishop. Ward societies were not interconnected by central women's leadership, though many of them engaged in similar activities such as sewing clothing for Indians, caring for the poor, especially emigrants, and weaving carpets for local meetinghouses.

In 2004, historian Carol Holindrake Nielson documented the organization, activities and membership of the Salt Lake City Fourteenth Ward Relief Society. The Fourteenth Ward included Temple Square and eleven residential squares to the south and west. This section contained the homes of many church leaders. Among others, the ward Relief Society roll included the names of Leonora Taylor and Jane B. Taylor, wives of John Taylor; Elizabeth B. Pratt, Kezia D. Pratt and Phoebe Soper Pratt, wives of Parley P. Pratt; and Phebe W. Woodruff, Emma Woodruff, Sarah Woodruff, Sarah Delight Woodruff, Phebe A. Woodruff, Susan C. Woodruff, Bulah Woodruff, wives and daughters of Wilford Woodruff.

Interrupted by the 1858 Utah War, no more than three or four of these independent ward organizations survived the temporary move of much of the Latter-day Saint population south of Salt Lake County.

== Reorganization and expansion 1867-1879 ==
14th Ward Relief Society Hall circa 1893

In December 1867 church president Brigham Young publicly called for the reorganization of Relief Society in every ward. Eliza R. Snow provided a historical account of the society and described its purpose to seek "not only for the relief of the poor, but the accomplishment of every good and noble work." Young again addressed the need to establish local Relief Society units at the church's 1868 April general conference, stating: "Now, Bishops, you have smart women for wives, many of you. Let them organize Female Relief Societies in the various wards. We have many talented women among us .... You will find that the sisters will be the mainspring of the movement." Snow was assigned to assist local bishops in organizing permanent branches of the Relief Society. Using the minutes recorded in the early Nauvoo meetings as a Constitution, Snow created a standard model for all local wards that united women in purpose and provided a permanent name and structure to their organization. She and nine other sisters began visiting wards and settlements in 1868, and at the end of the year, organizations existed in all twenty Salt Lake City congregations and in congregations in nearly every county in Utah.

Ward units of the Relief Society performed a variety of functions. Women helped the bishop of the ward assist the poor by collecting and disbursing funds and commodities. They nursed the sick, cleaned homes, sewed carpet rags for local meeting houses, planted and tended gardens, promoted home industry, and shared doctrinal instruction and testimony.

Snow provided central leadership both before and after her call as General President in 1880. She emphasized spirituality and self-sufficiency. The Relief Society sent women to medical school, trained nurses, opened the Deseret Hospital, operated cooperative stores, promoted silk manufacture, saved wheat, and built granaries. In 1872, Snow provided assistance and advice to Louisa L. Greene in the creation of a woman's publication, the Woman's Exponent, which was loosely affiliated with the Relief Society. Emmeline B. Wells succeeded Greene and continued as editor until its final issue in 1914.

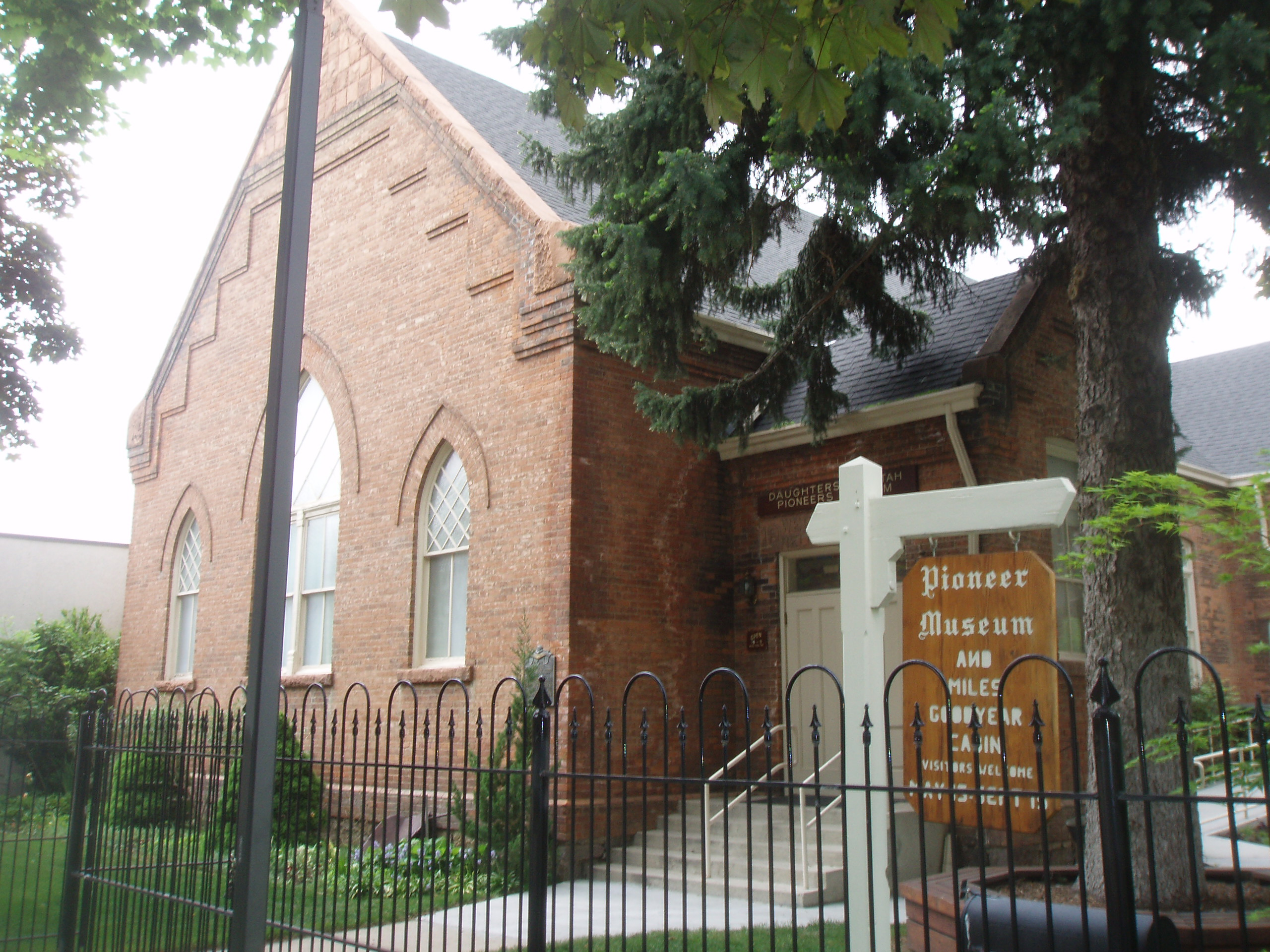
Only stake Relief Society building to have been built. Located in Ogden, Utah.

Under Snow's direction, Relief Society sisters nurtured young women and children. Heeding Brigham Young's 1869 call to reform, Snow, Mary Isabella Horne, and others established the Ladies' Cooperative Retrenchment Association from which the Young Ladies' Department of the Ladies' Cooperative Retrenchment was formed (later called the Young Ladies' Mutual Improvement Association and now the Young Women). Snow also worked with Aurelia Spencer Rogers to establish the first ward Primary Association in 1878. By 1888, the Relief Society had more than 22,000 members in 400 local wards and branches.

In 1877, stake Relief Society positions were created, and Jane Richards became the first stake Relief Society president in Ogden, Utah.

== Relief Society grain storage program, 1876-1978 ==
In 1877 Brigham Young approached Emmeline B. Wells and asked her to organize the women to store grain. As the editor of the Woman's Exponent, Wells was in a position to promulgate and enlist the help of the women of the church. Soon, the program became a major effort and program of the Relief Society. Under her direction, women grew, harvested, stored, and sold grain. Income from this program funded various humanitarian projects for decades.

Relief Societies responded enthusiastically. In Hyrum, Utah women held fairs, sold "Sunday eggs" (eggs laid on Sunday) and held bazaars to raise $639 to construct a granary and relief society building. Ward Relief Society granaries were built in many locations in the early years of the program, but by 1910 efficient storage facilities in Salt Lake City were created. Ward Relief Societies continued ownership of wheat stored centrally, receiving monetary credit when wheat was transferred.

After the 1906 San Francisco earthquake, the Relief Society sent at least sixteen carloads of wheat from fourteen different Utah communities. Grain was also sent to relieve the Chinese Famine of 1907, among other charitable activities.

For the Relief Society, the grain program was considered to be their exclusive stewardship, separate from the system of Bishop storehouses. If distributed by the Relief Society, grain was given without cost, but if distributed by the Bishops, the grain was considered a loan and expected to be repaid with interest.

=== World War I sale of the grain ===
In 1917 during World War I, the grain supply in the United States began to run low. Requests from federal agents to buy the Relief Society grain were declined, with the reasoning that the grain was for charitable purposes, not for commercial use.

In May 1918 the grain shortage became acute, and the United States government demanded the sale of the wheat. Presiding Bishop Charles W. Nibley, with the concurrence of the First Presidency, sent a letter to all ward Relief Societies to comply and turn over the grain to the Federal Government. The letter was sent the names of the Relief Society General presidency as though authorized by them, but the presidency was not consulted nor aware before the letter was sent. The Relief Society felt this was a breach of trust, and when Nibley apologized for this action, Emmeline B. Wells response was that "the sisters were not adverse to selling their wheat to the Government but that she could not help but feel very much hurt personally that such an important action had been taken without consulting the General Board."

When news of the sale reached the United States House of Representatives, official proceedings were paused and a round of applause was given. A statement of Herbert Hoover, head of the US Food Administration was then read on the house floor: "...this service by the women of the Relief Society who had thus tendered over two hundred thousand bushels of first-class milling wheat to the United States for the cause of human liberty, and for the saving of the lives of thousands who might suffer for the lack of bread to eat." A trust fund was created from the sale of the grain that was used for child welfare work and maternity care.

President Woodrow Wilson passed through Utah in 1919, and made only one private visit. Wilson and his wife visited Emmeline B. Wells at the Hotel Utah, where Wells was recovering from an illness, to thank her for the generosity of the Relief Society in the nation's "hour of need."

Relief Society granaries
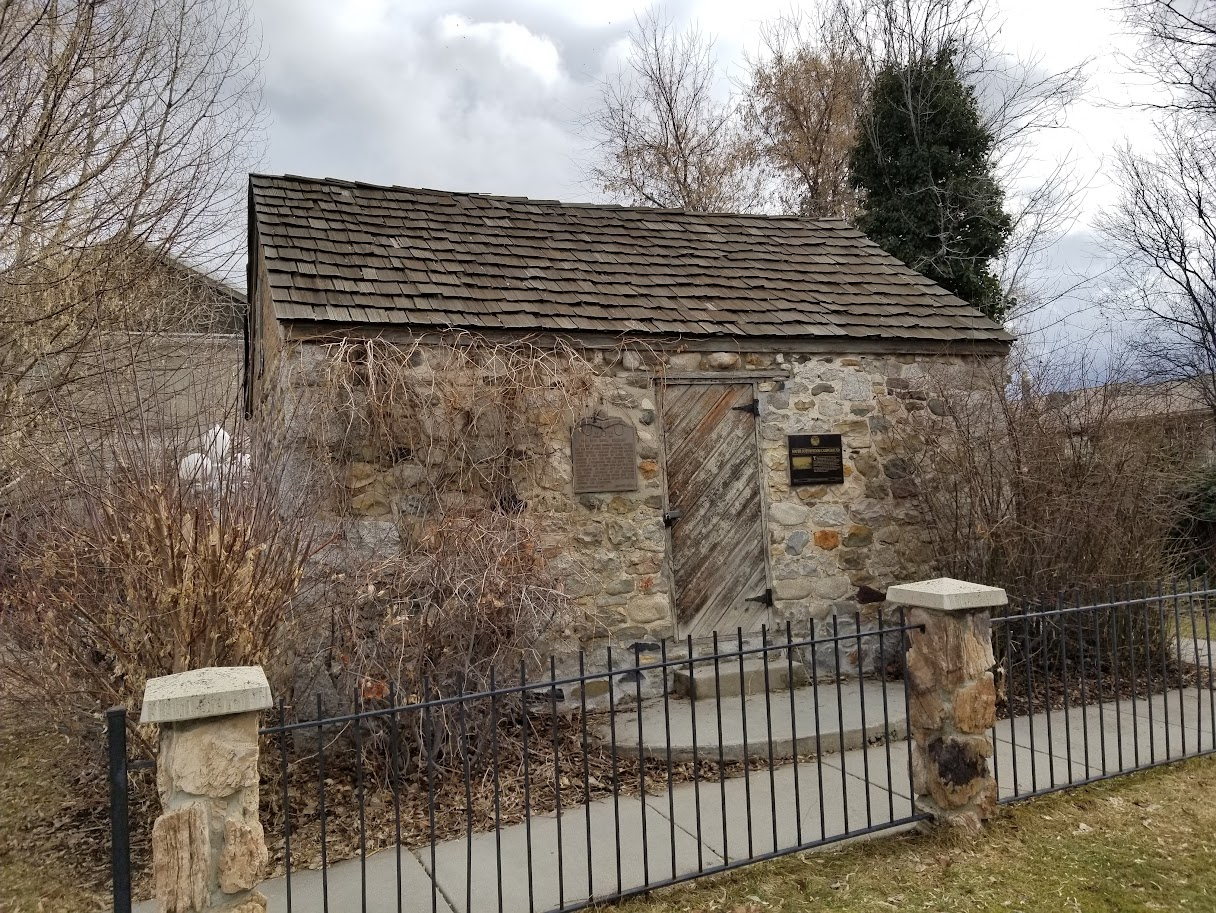
Murray, Utah built 1876

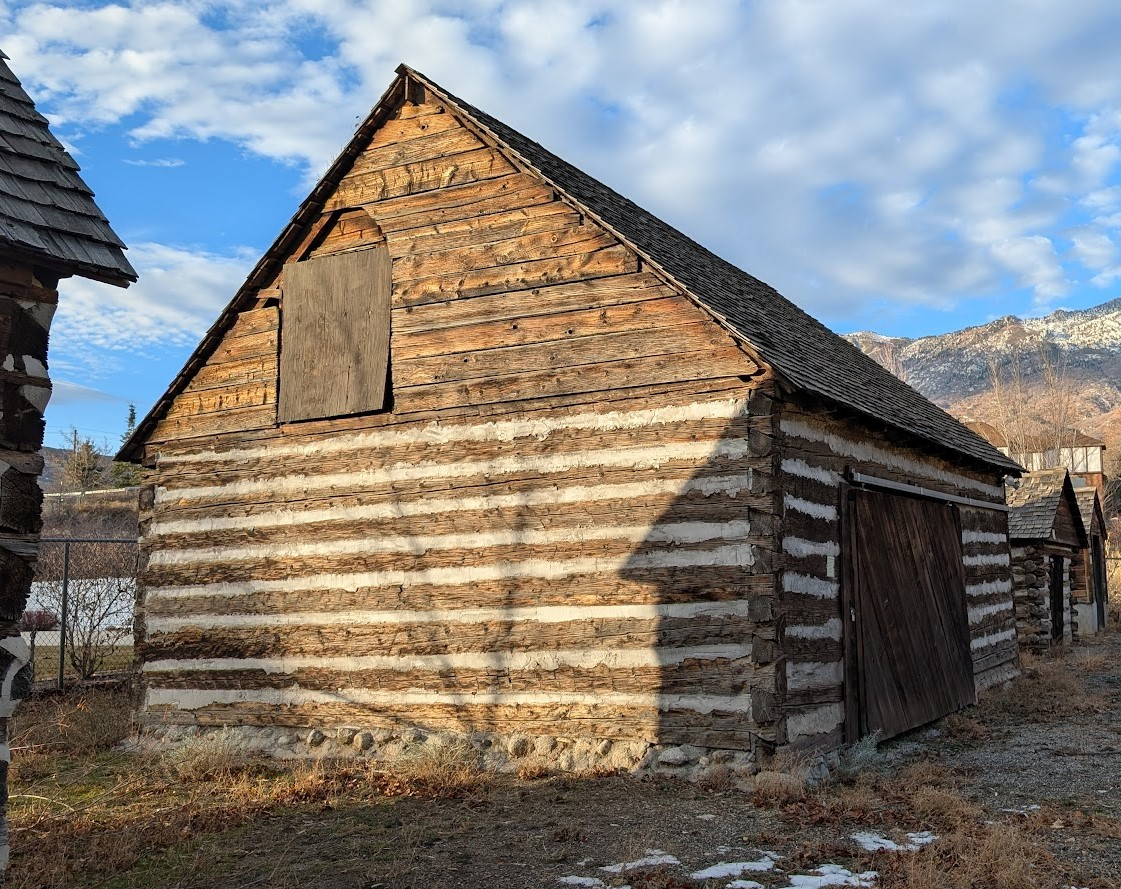
Alpine, Utah

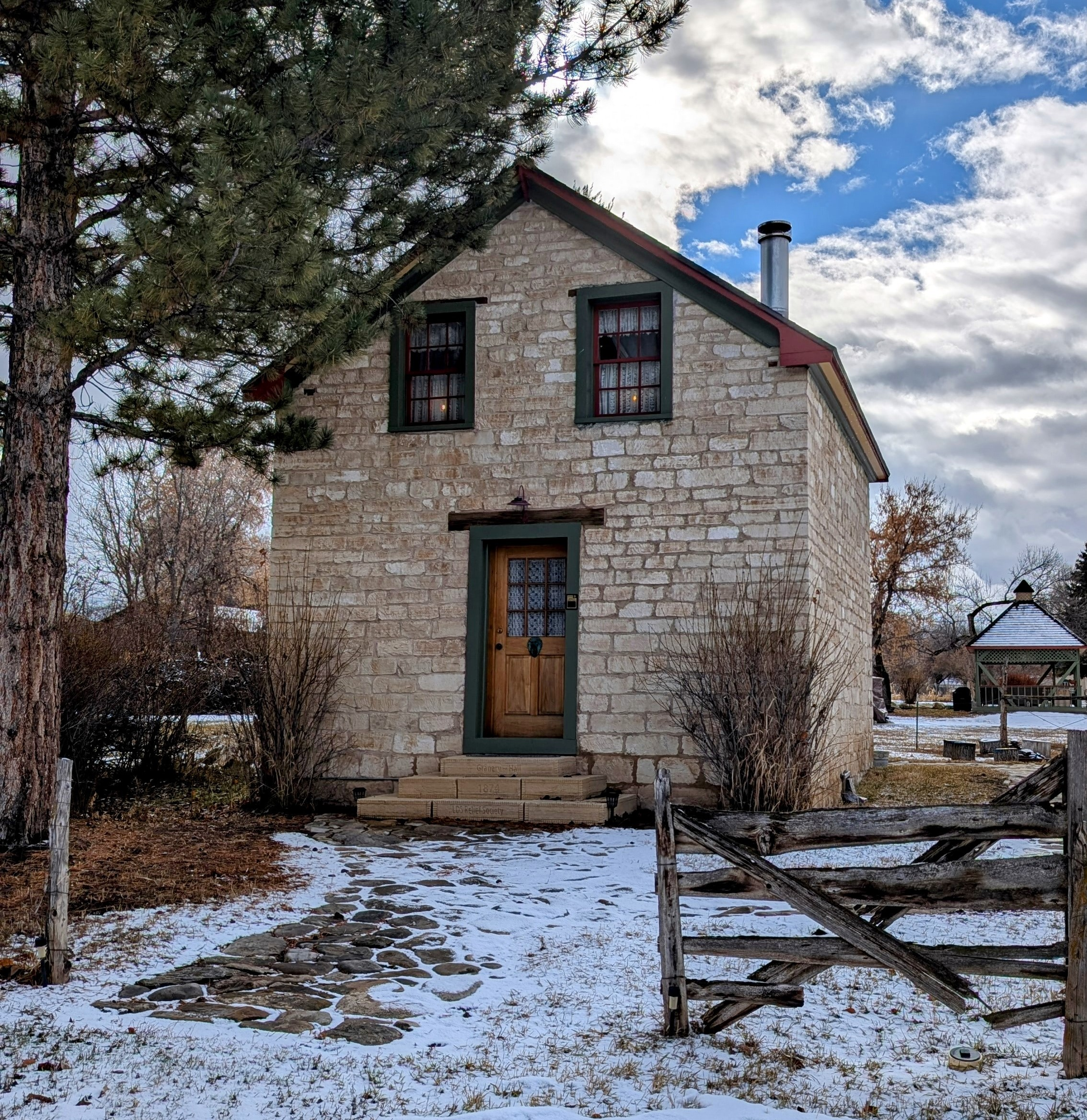
Spring City, Utah

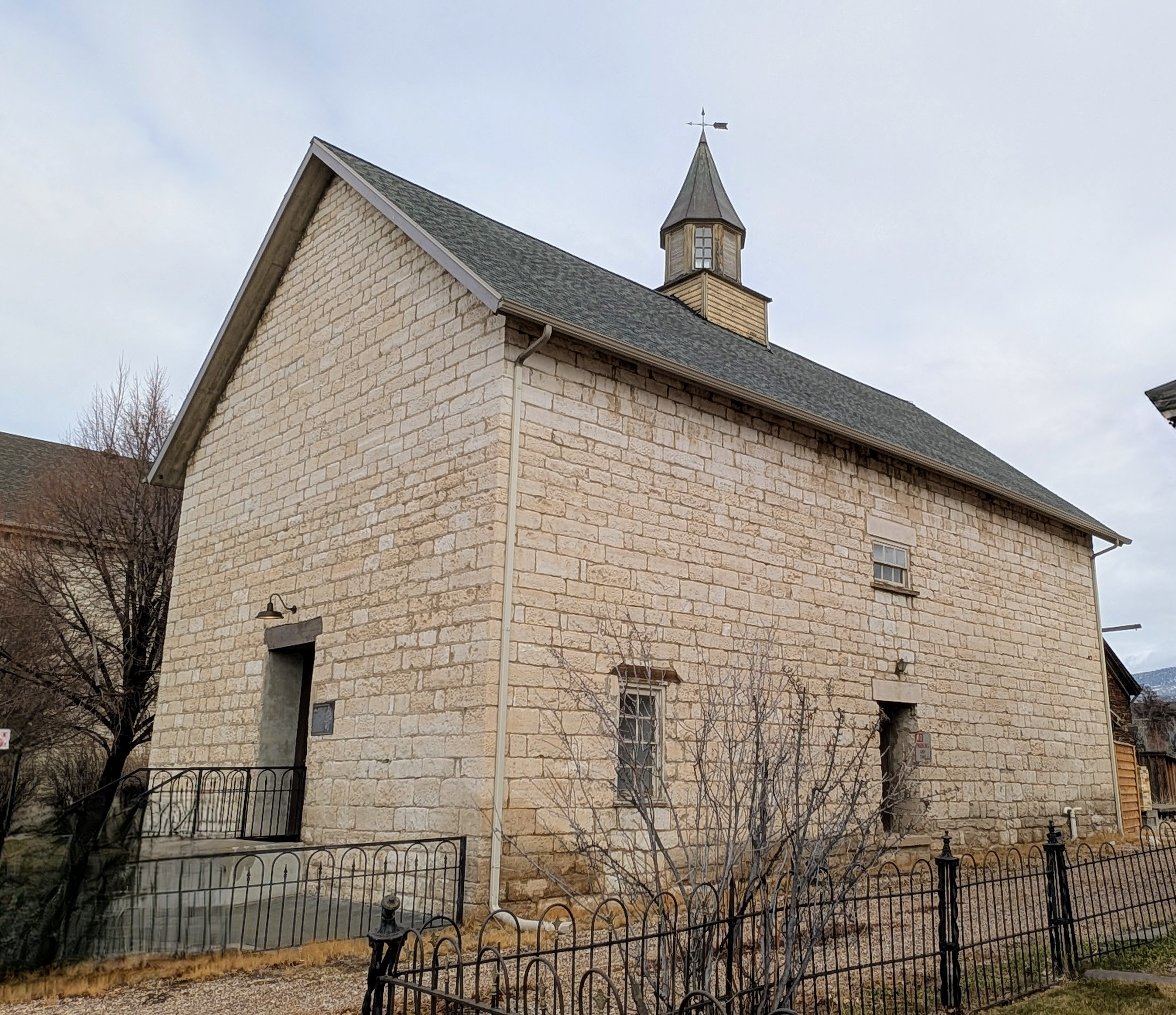
Ephraim, Utah

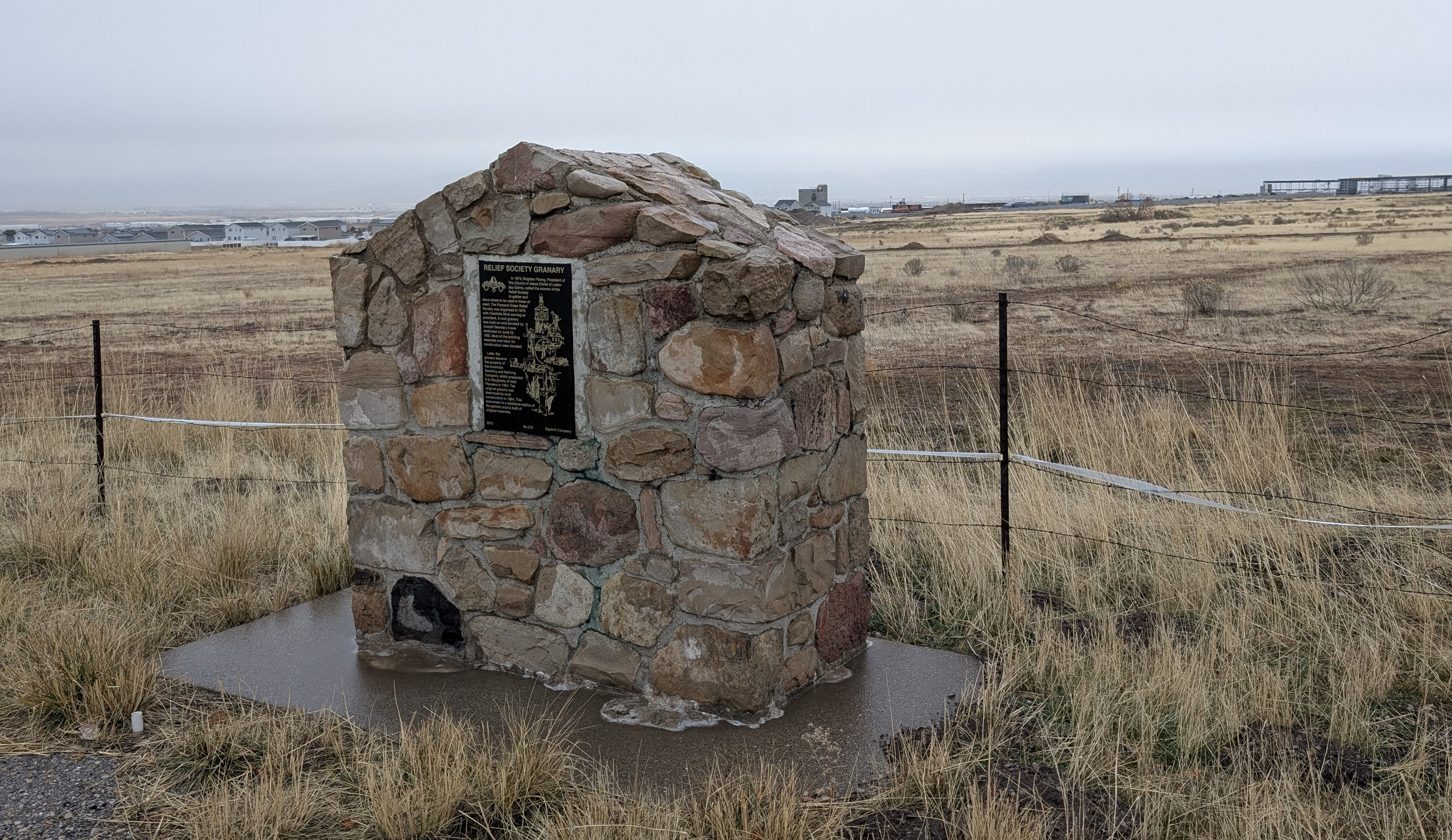
Memorial in Magna, Utah built with original building material.

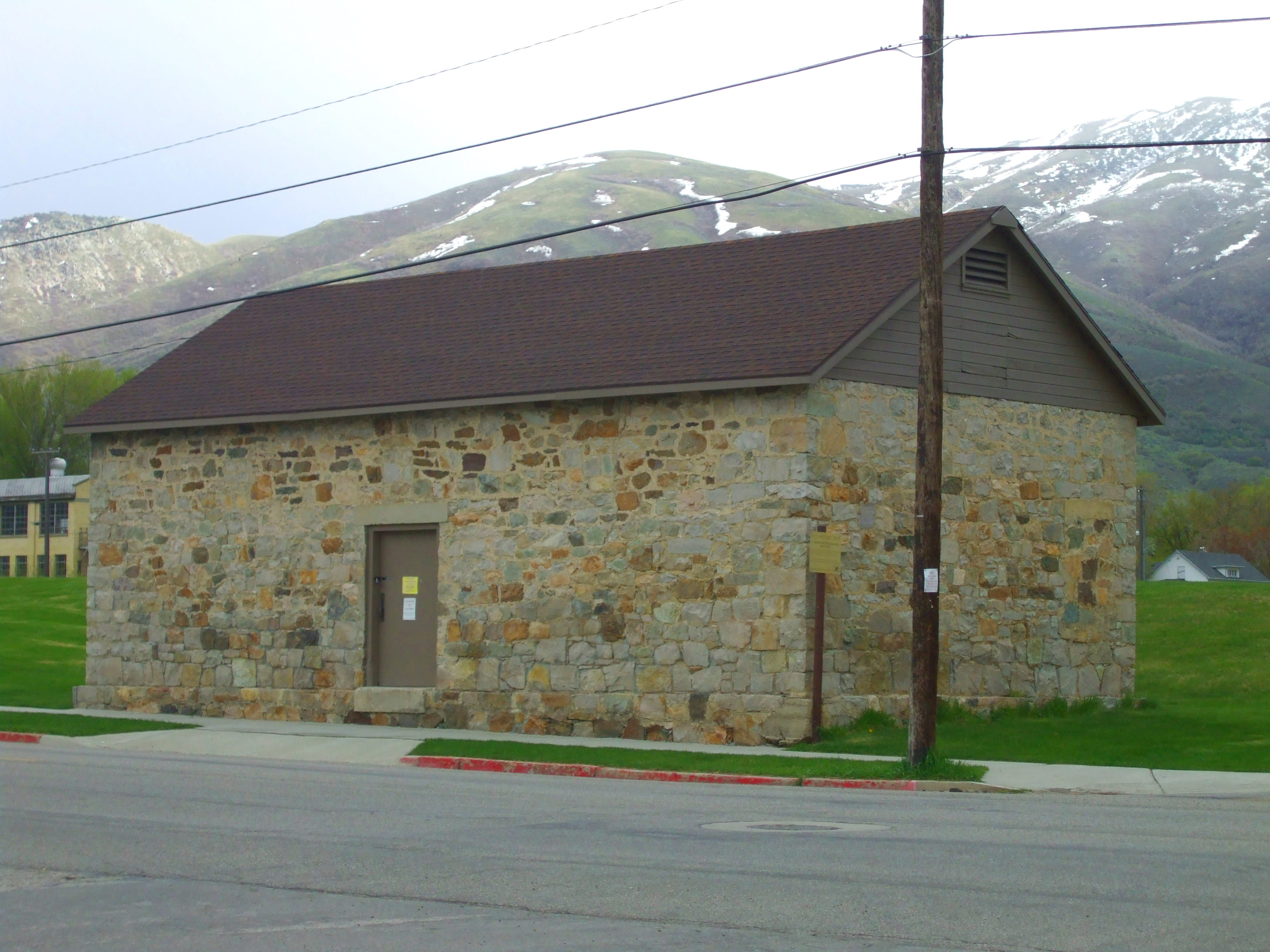
Brigham City, Utah

=== The Wheat Fund ===
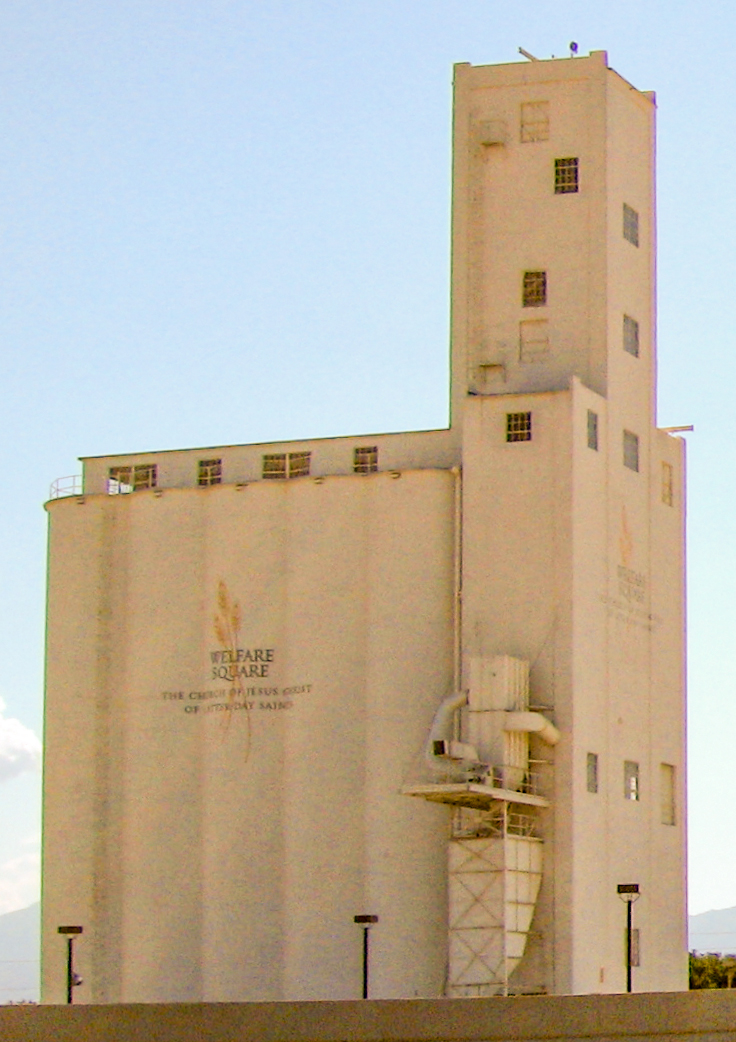
Silos on Welfare Square, initially filled using wheat fund money.

Money from the sale of the grain storage program was placed into what was known as the wheat fund. The fund initially had $412,000 and was managed as part of the general fund by the Presiding Bishopric. In 1922, Relief Society General President Clarissa Williams urged that the interest from the fund be used to improve maternity care. Against the wishes of the General Relief Society presidency, checks for interest on the fund were sent directly to the local Relief Societies. Maternity chests, containing materials needed for home delivery, became common features of local wards and stakes. The money was also used on other health initiatives, such as preventative care for children and arranging nursing care. By 1931, Utah had the greatest reduction in both maternal mortality rates and infant mortality rates in the nation, and Utah was ranked in the top 5 states for lowest mother/infant mortality rates. As home births became less common in favor of hospital births, the need for maternity chests gradually ended by 1939.

In 1939, the Presiding Bishopric began mailing interest checks from the wheat fund directly to Bishops, continuing the slow trend of decreased autonomy for the Relief Society. The same year, 25% of the fund was used to purchase grain elevators and wheat to fill the new grain silos on Welfare Square and in Idaho.

In 1978 the Church's Welfare Services program took official control over the assets of the grain storage program. At the October General conference, President Barbara Smith presented a scroll decorated with stalks of wheat to President Spencer W. Kimball representing the 226,291 bushels of wheat worth $1.65 million controlled by the Relief Society, and wheat fund assets now valued at around $750,000. Smith said, "It is with great pride in the accomplishments of the past and with tenderness of heart that we, the women of Zion, place our wheat and wheat assets at your disposal, President Kimball, to be used for grain storage purposes under your administration, through the General Church Welfare Committee."

== Standardization and expansion of the Relief Society 1880-1892 ==
Relief Society conference at Upolu, Samoa, held in October 1918.

In 1891, the Relief Society became a charter member of the National Council of Women of the United States and it was called the National Women's Relief Society.

Early Relief Society meetings were generally held semi-monthly. One meeting per month was devoted to sewing and caring for the needs of the poor. At meetings members might receive instruction, discuss elevating and educational topics, and bear testimony. The women were also encouraged to explore and develop cultural opportunities for their community.

== Educational and social reform 1900-1929 ==
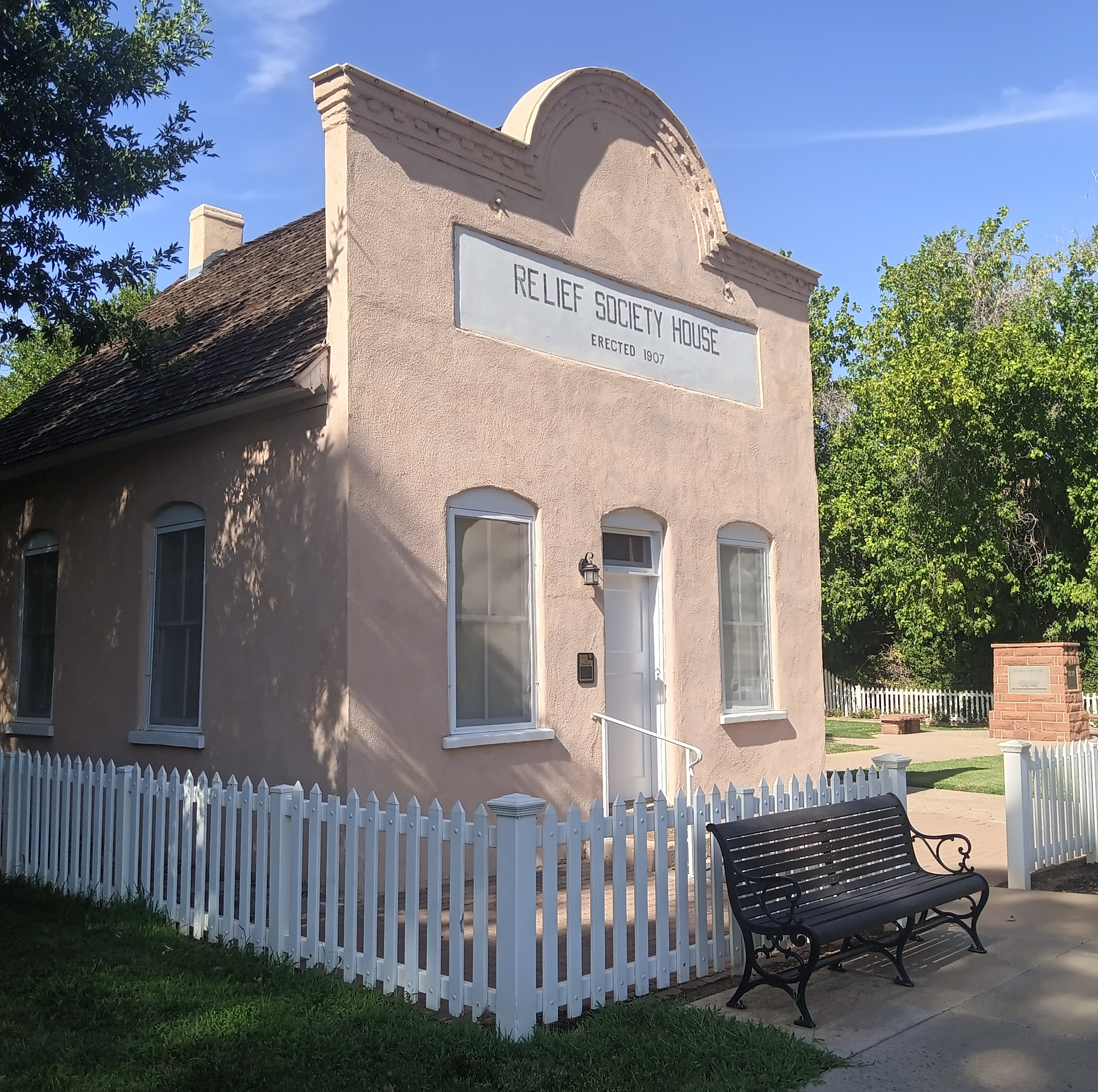
Historic Relief Society building in Santa Clara, Utah.

Stakes began circulating outlines for lessons in 1902. The first standardized lessons were published by the General Board in 1914 in the Relief Society Bulletin, later renamed the Relief Society Magazine in 1915. These lessons included information on genealogy, literature, home economics, theology, and social work. Throughout this era the Relief Society trained women in first aid, social work, food preservation, public health, maternity and infant health, nutrition, hygiene and vaccination, and charity work.

After Emmeline B. Wells was elected president, the Relief Society continued the trend toward progressivism that had begun under Bathsheba Smith. Wells raised membership dues from ten cents to twenty five cents to cover Relief Society initiatives such as updating the nurses' training program and creating a Relief Society home for single women. Funds also came from the Relief Society-run burial and temple clothing department. Wells expanded the Relief Society's employment bureau, secured the remaining woman's commission store, and provided temporary shelter for immigrants. In addition, she established a program called "organized charity" which involved keeping a statistical report of charity hours. The Relief Society at this time was involved in contemporary social issues and pushed legislation to protect women and children. It actively supported the kindergarten movement, the Neighborhood House for youths, and the juvenile court. They created a burial and school insurance program for women and children that was endorsed by Joseph F. Smith.

John Widstoe characterized the Relief Society purpose to be "relief of poverty, relief of illness; relief of doubt, relief of ignorance — relief of all that hinders the joy and progress of woman."

In 1928 there was tension within the Relief Society that there was too much emphasis on social welfare. Annie Wells Cannon, a member of the Relief Society General board, complained to church President Heber J. Grant that "the spirit of the Gospel and religion seem to have disappeared, and it seems to be a social welfare organization." She also held the view that Amy B. Lyman was actually running the Relief Society instead of President Clarissa S. Williams. Williams health was indeed failing, and she became the first General President to ask to be released from her calling in 1928, being succeeded by Louise Y. Robison. At the October general conference of the Relief Society she stated, "You will recollect that it has always been my policy to advocate to you that we do not retain our positions too long, that there are many capable women and that such honor and dignity as comes with positions of this kind, should rotate."

== Great Depression and WWII relief efforts 1930-1945 ==
By 1942, membership in the organization was approximately 115,000 women, growing to 300,000 members in 1966.

In June 1945, the General Board changed the organization's official name to "Relief Society of The Church of Jesus Christ of Latter-day Saints".

== Correlation 1960-1971 ==
The church-wide implementation of Priesthood Correlation in the 1960s "radically transformed" the Relief Society. These changes assisted in preparing the Relief Society for an era of a worldwide church; correlated lessons and materials were easier to translate and applicable to a broader audience. A side-effect of these changes was that the Relief Society lost much of the autonomy that it once enjoyed, notably around its budget.

In July 1970 the First Presidency sent two letters that stopped fund-raising activities and membership dues to the Relief Society and transferred control of the Relief Society assets to priesthood officers. Direct decision making authority by the Relief Society over budget matters was transferred at every level of church organization, as Relief Society representation was not added to the general finance committee, and at the local level women were not permitted to serve as financial clerks or as part of the bishopric. Whereas before Relief Society Presidents had full discretion over budget disbursements, spending now had to go through a priesthood officer.

Additionally in 1970, the correlation committee ended the Relief Society Magazine, to save on cost and streamline church publications. This had the side effect of removing the primary communication method of the General Relief Society with its members, and directing formal communication through priesthood controlled channels. The Relief Society Magazine's last edition was December 1970, after which it and several other church magazines were replaced with the Ensign. An editorial by Marianne Sharp in the final edition read "As we detail and recall nostalgic memories, we still, obedient to the priesthood and receiving direction from them, face forward in step with the new era of the 1970's with anticipation and a sense of dedication and support for the all-adult magazine. Moriturae te salutamus." Sharp translated the latin as "We salute you in death."

=== Exponent II Magazine ===
In 1974, distressed by the loss of financial autonomy and their own women-led LDS publication, a group of second-wave feminist LDS Church women gathered together in Cambridge, Massachusetts and began work on their own publication, Exponent II. They named their newspaper after the older Relief Society publication, Woman's Exponent, and hoped "to give Mormon women greater status, share news and life views, and foster friendships." The women formed a non-profit organization to fund Exponent II. They first incorporated as Mormon Sisters, Inc., and later as Exponent II, Inc. Laurel Thatcher Ulrich, Carrel Hilton Sheldon, Judy Dushku, Heather Cannon, Connie Cannon, and Sue Booth-Forbes were among the women who organized themselves. Claudia Bushman was selected as the newspaper's first editor.

== 1970s-present ==
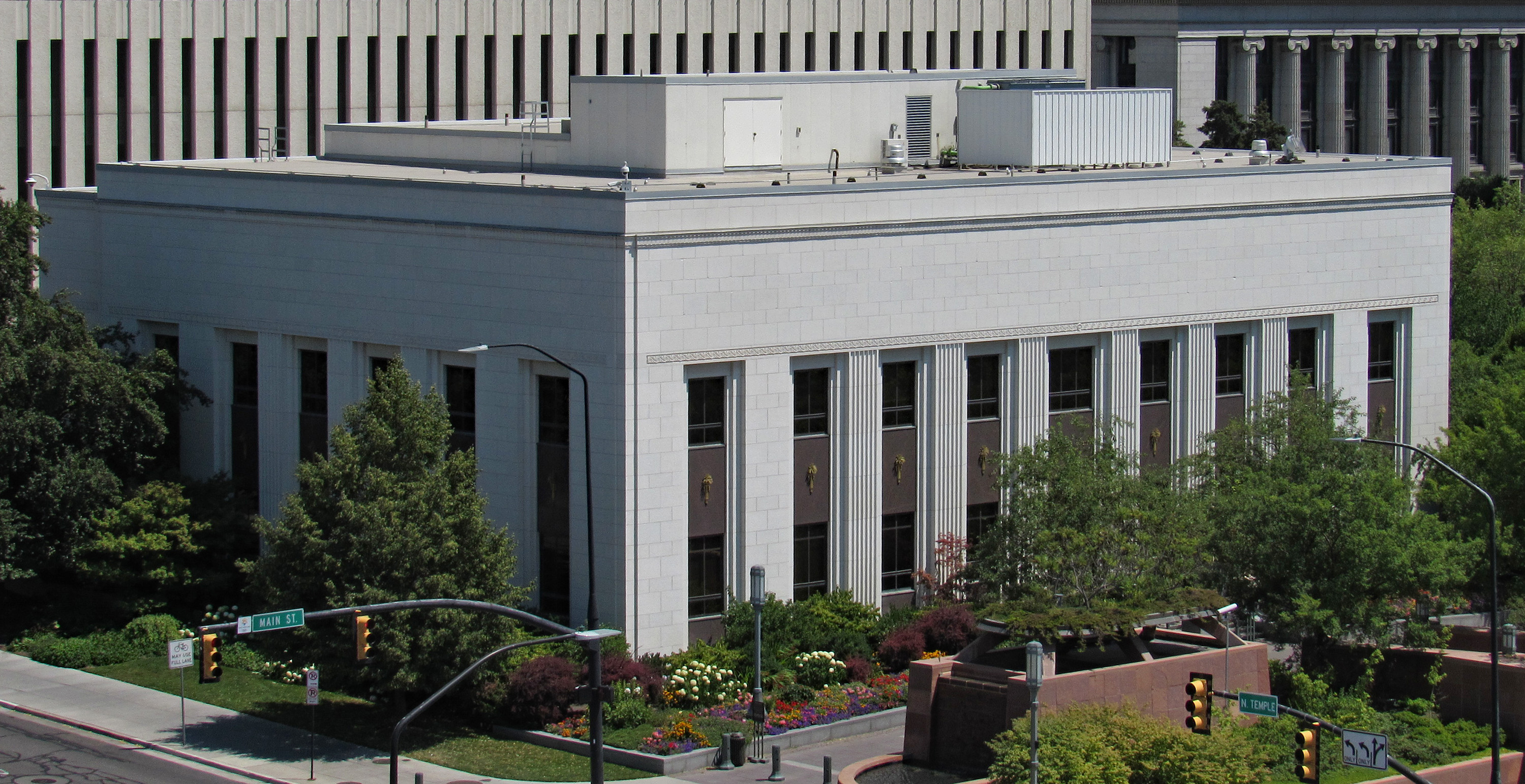
Relief Society Headquarters building in Salt Lake City

In April 2005, the Relief Society received the American Red Cross "Heroes 2004 Award" for its service in the Greater Salt Lake area. In 2010, Catholic Community Services honored Julie Beck, the general president of the Relief Society, where she was named Community Partner.

== See also ==
- Weber Stake Relief Society Building
