= Jennie B. Knight =

American missionary (1875–1957)

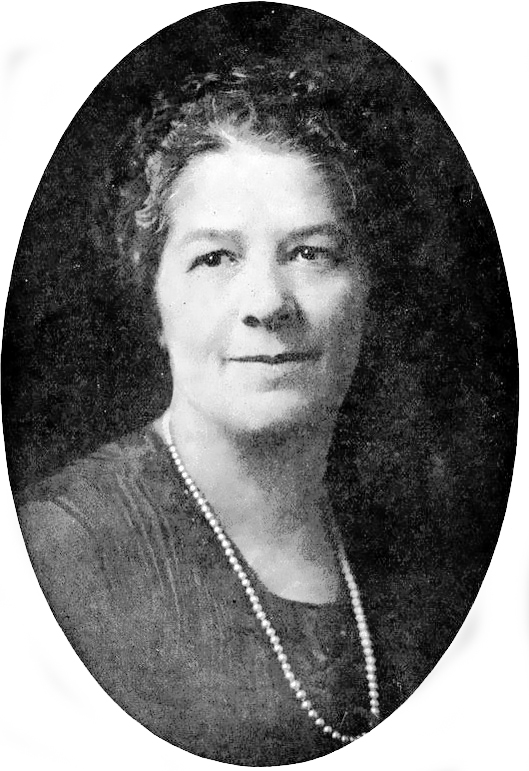

First Counselor in the general presidency of the Relief Society
- April 2, 1921 – October 7, 1928
- Called by: Clarissa S. Williams
- Predecessor: Clarissa S. Williams
- Successor: Amy B. Lyman

Personal details
- Born: Jennie Brimhall; December 13, 1875; Spanish Fork, Utah Territory, United States
- Died: March 31, 1957 (aged 81); Provo, Utah, United States
- Resting place: Provo City Cemetery; 40.225°N 111.644°W
- Organization: Executive for Utah County Red Cross
- Spouse(s): J. William Knight
- Children: 2
- Parents: George H. Brimhall; Alsina Elizabeth Wilkins

Lucy Jane ("Jennie") Brimhall Knight (December 13, 1875 – March 31, 1957 (aged 81)) was a leader in the Church of Jesus Christ of Latter-day Saints (LDS Church). She was also one of the first two single female missionaries of the LDS Church.

== Biography ==
Jennie Brimhall was born in Spanish Fork, Utah Territory, to George H. Brimhall and Alsina Elizabeth Wilkins. As a child, she attended Provo Central School where her father presided. In her later years, Jennie was educated as a teacher at Brigham Young Academy (BYU). Upon graduating in 1895, she worked as the assistant principal in the primary department of the district school in Bluff City, Utah. In fall of 1896, Jennie returned to Provo to teach at Brigham Young Academy. On April 1, 1898, Jennie was set apart as one of the first two single women in the LDS Church to be formally selected as full-time church missionaries.

After she returned from her mission, Jennie Brimhall married J. William Knight in January 1899. Shortly thereafter, she accompanied her husband to Canada. Jesse Knight, Jennie’s father-in-law, had been told of the land’s fertility and wanted William, and his brother Raymond, to check out the area. This trip ultimately led to the purchase of 30,000 acres in Canada by Jesse Knight and the establishment of the Mormon settlement of Raymond in present-day Alberta. Many young individuals and families were attracted to the new town, and within two years there was major growth of population and church facilities. Jennie Knight was a prominent figure in the growth of the church in Raymond. She was the president of the Taylor Stake's Young Ladies Mutual Improvement Association (YLMIA) from 1903 to 1906. The YLMIA was a church wide organization that aimed to give young women greater educational, recreational, and spiritual opportunities. They taught standardized lessons and put on church camps for the local branches of the association.

After their time in Canada, Jennie and William Knight returned to live in Utah. In 1921, Jennie Knight was selected as the first counselor to Clarissa S. Williams in the General Presidency of the Relief Society of the Church of Jesus Christ of Latter Day Saints. Along with Louise Y. Robison, Knight was a counselor to Williams until 1928, when the presidency was released from their duties.

Throughout her life, Jennie inspired civic involvement and social activism within women of the LDS Church. Jennie Knight, though not as widely recognized in major publications as other early LDS women like Emmaline B. Wells and Susa Young Gates, was a prominent figure in the National Council of Women. Her active participation in the political and social spheres of organizations outside of the church contributed to the efforts of LDS women to improve their representation and advocate societal progress.

Knight was the mother of two sons, Philip and Richard. The Knight Mangum Building on the BYU campus in Provo, Utah, is named after Knight and her sister-in-law Jennie Knight Mangum. Jennie died on March 31, 1957, of heart disease. Knight is buried in the Provo City Cemetery.

== LDS Mission ==
The first LDS missionaries were called to serve in the 1830s. In the early beginnings of Latter-day Saint missionary work, missionaries could have been called to build the church in ways of proselytizing, colonizing, or building homes and churches. The first missionaries were strictly male and often had wives and families that they left in order to serve their mission. Since 1865, women had either accompanied their husbands in serving missions or served non-proselytizing missions such as in midwifery, the Tabernacle choir, and genealogy, but merely were set apart with a blessing, rather than an official mission call. If women were unmarried, they could not fill out a mission application. Rumors circulated in Europe about LDS women, and the European Mission President wanted to have young women, just like young men, officially called to serve and also set the record straight. In the late 1890s, Jennie Brimhall and Inez Knight were planning a European vacation to visit Jennie's fiancé, Jesse William Knight—who was also Inez's brother—while he served in the Great Britain mission. The bishop of their local congregation, knowing about their upcoming vacation plans, asked if they would be willing to turn their trip into an official mission.

On April 1, 1898, Jennie and Inez were set apart as the first single women missionaries in the LDS church. Young women had never been called to serve in this capacity before. Jennie and Inez did not have to go through the formal process of filling out paperwork due to the speed and urgency of the call. Prior to their departure, Jennie and Inez did not receive any training or traditional preparation that young men received for their mission field experience, they wanted them to leave and serve as quickly as possible. April 2nd, the day after being set apart, Jennie and Inez embarked on their twenty day boat journey to England. Upon arrival in England, Jennie Brimhall and Inez Knight were now officially missionary companions.

Jennie returned to Utah in November 1898 due to poor health.

== Magazine publications ==
- Knight Brimhall, Jennie (March 1928). "National Council of Women in the United States". Relief Society Magazine.
  - Jennie Knight was a prominent figure in the National Council of Women in the United States (NCW). Though the NCW was not specifically affiliated with the LDS Church, Jennie's written contributions to early LDS magazine for women, "Relief Society Magazine", highlighted ways that the NCW and LDS Church organizations aligned. In this specific article, Jennie wrote about the importance of collective action and its impact regarding women's rights, specifically suffrage and educational reform. Her leadership position in the church, and involvement in the NCW, helped build national and international bridges as well as give greater visibility to the LDS Church.
- Knight Brimhall, Jennie (May 1929). "The Pioneer Mother: Avard Fairbanks' Tribute in Stone". Relief Society Magazine. 16.
  - Jennie Knight often spoke of pioneering, specifically amongst women in the LDS Church. Avard Fairbanks, renowned LDS sculptor, commissioned a statue of a woman and two children to honor pioneer women of the LDS faith. Jennie Knight wrote an article in the Relief Society Magazine honoring Fairbanks and this meaningful statute. She describes this work of art as a representation of strength and the maternal spirit of pioneer women. Knight goes on to describe the talent of Avard Fairbanks and lists other works and accomplishments from his lifetime.
- Knight Brimhall, Jennie (August 1944). "Pioneering in Southern Alberta, Canada". Relief Society Magazine.
  - In this article, Jennie Knight reflects on the early beginnings of LDS settlements in Canada, which is the project she was a part of. This account gives a historical background of these settlements, specifically in Southern Alberta. She speaks of the wonderful agricultural possibilities for LDS families and how that encouraged movement north. Jennie describes the trek from Utah to Canada and how eager the people were to get there. Many described it as a beautiful sight with rivers and mountains, similar to the Rockies. Upon arrival in Canada, Jennie depicts the relationships formed with the Indigenous tribes and local ranchers, many which took time to build. She claims that those who were settler minded were there to stay and build up opportunities for those of the LDS faith.
  - Knight Brimhall, Jennie (January 1945). "Settling Raymond, Alberta, Canada". Relief Society Magazine. 32 (1): 524–528.
    - Following her article about the general pioneering of Southern Alberta, Canada, Jennie Knight wrote an article about the specific settlement, Raymond, which was named after her husband’s older brother. This piece emphasizes that the town was built by pioneers and a way for her father-in-law, Jesse Knight, to use his wealth for good. The main attraction was the sugar factory built specifically for LDS church members to find employment. Jennie Knight writes how her father-in-law built homes for himself and his family, including Jennie and her husband William. Jennie describes the early beginnings of this town and how it grew rapidly, especially among recent college graduates. Her husband, William Knight was the first bishop of the local LDS congregation and their home became a place where many prominent LDS church figures stayed. Jennie recounts her role in hosting and building up the local Relief Society.

== Additional publications ==
=== Articles ===
- "Greeting". Relief Society Magazine. 9 (12): 1. January 1922.
- "To Our Beloved Sisters". Relief Society Magazine. 11 (12): 601. December 1924.
- "National Council of Women of the United States". Relief Society Magazine. 15 (3): 138–142. March 1928.
- "Louise Yates Robison". Relief Society Magazine. 16 (1): 3–6. January 1929.
- "The Pioneer Mother". Relief Society Magazine. 16 (5): 233–236. May 1929.
- "Tributes to Clarissa Smith Williams". Relief Society Magazine. 17 (5): 224–225. May 1930.
- "Bessie Potter Vonnoh". Relief Society Magazine. 18 (5): 273–275. May 1931.
- "Alice Louise Reynolds". Relief Society Magazine. 26 (1): 5–7. January 1939.
- "Pioneering in Southern Alberta, Canada". Relief Society Magazine. 31 (8): 425–430. August 1944.
- "Settling Raymond, Alberta, Canada". Relief Society Magazine. 32 (8): 524–528. August 1945.

The Church of Jesus Christ of Latter-day Saints titles
Preceded by Clarissa S. Williams	First Counselor in the general presidency of the Relief Society; April 2, 1921–October 7, 1928	Succeeded by Amy B. Lyman
