= Marianne C. Sharp =

American Mormon leader (1901–1990)

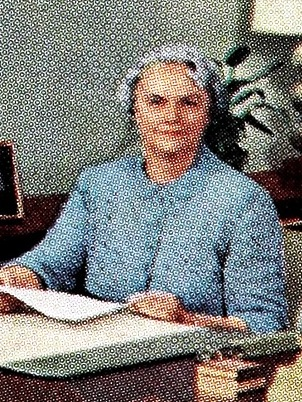

First Counselor in the general presidency of the Relief Society
- April 6, 1945 – October 3, 1974
- Called by: Belle S. Spafford
- Predecessor: Marcia K. Howells
- Successor: Janath R. Cannon

Personal details
- Born: Marianne Savage Clark; October 28, 1901; Grantsville, Utah, United States
- Died: January 2, 1990 (aged 88); Salt Lake City, Utah, United States
- Resting place: Salt Lake City Cemetery; 40.7772°N 111.858°W
- Spouse(s): Ivor Sharp
- Parents: J. Reuben Clark; Luacine Annetta Savage

Marianne Savage Clark Sharp (October 28, 1901 – January 2, 1990) was the first counselor in the general presidency of the Relief Society of the Church of Jesus Christ of Latter-day Saints from 1945 until 1974.

== Early life and education ==
Born Marianne Clark, she was a daughter of J. Reuben Clark, who was a member of the LDS Church's First Presidency, and his wife Luacine Annetta Savage Clark. Sharp was born in Grantsville, Utah. While growing up, she attended school in Washington D.C. Marianne Clark attended Western High School where she was the editor of the school year book and graduated in 1919 as the valedictorian of her class.

Marianne Clark then went on to attend the University of Utah, graduating with high honors. She studied Ancient Languages, She received a teaching fellowship in Latin during her senior year at the university. Sharp and graduated in 1924 and continued teaching Latin at the University of Utah and also at Stewart Training School.

In 1927 she married Ivor Sharp in the Salt Lake Temple. For the next decade she lived in New York City. While there, she served for a time as a stake Relief Society president. From 1938 on she lived in Salt Lake City, Utah.

== Church service ==
Sharp served on the General Relief Society Board for 34 years. She was appointed to the Relief Society General Presidency in 1940. J. Reuben Clark tried to dissuade Relief Society president Belle S. Spafford from choosing his daughter as a counselor. In 1943, she became the associate editor of Relief Society Magazine until 1945, when she became its editor. She remained its editor until it ceased publication in January 1971. Sharp was made president of the Relief Society in April 1945.

Sharp was awarded an honorary doctorate of humanities from Brigham Young University in 1974. She served in numerous capacities throughout her lifetime, including as a member of the board of governors of the LDS Hospital and Primary Children's Medical Center. She was also a member of the General Deseret Industries Committee. Sharp was a consultant to the Ensign magazine and was part of the Presiding Bishopric's Training Committee for the church. She was also a delegate to the International Council of Women to meetings in Washington, D.C., and Toronto.

Sharp died at Salt Lake City, Utah, on January 2, 1990.

== Publications ==
=== Articles ===
- "TA Present Day Challenge". Relief Society Magazine. 24 (1): 6–7. January 1937.
- "Morning Music of the Immortals". Relief Society Magazine. 26 (1): 31. January 1939.
- "Progress Under the Direction of the Priesthood". Relief Society Magazine. 27 (3): 168–169. March 1940.
- "Our Greatest Need". Relief Society Magazine. 27 (11): 775–777. November 1940.
- "Belle Smith Spafford Called to be Ninth General President of Relief Society, April 1945". Relief Society Magazine. 32 (5): 259–261. May 1945.
- "Dream for a Relief Society Building". Relief Society Magazine. 32 (12): 748–750. December 1945.
- "Bruce Redd McConkie Sustained a Member of First Council of Seventy". Relief Society Magazine. 33 (12): 818–819. December 1946.
- "Unveiling of the Portrait of President Belle S. Spafford". Relief Society Magazine. 34 (1): 4–5. January 1947.
- "Building for Eternity". Relief Society Magazine. 34 (3): 151–152, 214. March 1947.
- "Vesta P. Crawford Appointed Associate Editor of the Relief Society Magazine". Relief Society Magazine. 34 (10): 664. October 1947.
- "Joy in Leadership". Relief Society Magazine. 34 (12): 812–815. December 1947.
- "The Annual General Relief Society Conference". Relief Society Magazine. 34 (12): 798–800. December 1947.
- "The Annual General Relief Society Conference". Relief Society Magazine. 34 (12): 798–800. January 1947.
- "And What of the Promise". Relief Society Magazine. 35 (11): 727–729. November 1948.
- "Annual General Relief Society Conference". Relief Society Magazine. 36 (12): 798–800. November 1949.
- "Relief Society in the Lives of Latter-Day Saint Women". Relief Society Magazine. 39 (3): 147–148. March 1952.
- "Joy Here and Hereafter". Relief Society Magazine. 39 (11): 722–724. November 1952.
- "For Every Man Receiveth Wages". Relief Society Magazine. 40 (11): 720–721. November 1953.
- "But One Thing Is Needful". Relief Society Magazine. 41 (11): 721–724. January 1954.
- "Examples of the Believers". Relief Society Magazine. 42 (11): 723–725. November 1955.
- "The Grand Key - Words of Relief Society". Relief Society Magazine. 45 (11): 721–722. November 1958.
- "Study My Word". Relief Society Magazine. 46 (11): 721–723. November 1959.
- "Relief Society Today Needs You". Relief Society Magazine. 48 (11): 721–723. November 1961.
- "Relief Society - Builder of Testimonies". Relief Society Magazine. 49 (11): 802–803. November 1962.
- "The Seventy-fifth Anniversary Conference of the International Council of Women". Relief Society Magazine. 50 (9): 647–652. September 1963.
- "He Shall Prepare a Way". Relief Society Magazine. 50 (11): 813–814. November 1963.
- "Take My Yoke Upon You". Relief Society Magazine. 51 (11): 810–812. November 1964.
- "Love, the Measuring Rod". Relief Society Magazine. 52 (11): 808–809. November 1965.
- "Become a Friend of the Library". Relief Society Magazine. 53 (7): 490–491. July 1966.
- "None Other Name". Relief Society Magazine. 53 (11): 811–813. November 1966.
- "Security Amid Change". Relief Society Magazine. 54 (11): 810–812. November 1967.
- "Belle S. Spafford Elected President of the National Council of Women of the United States". Relief Society Magazine. 55 (11): 804–805. November 1968.
- "To Walk Uprightly Before the Lord". Relief Society Magazine. 55 (11): 812–814. November 1968.
- "The Greatest of These". Relief Society Magazine. 56 (11): 810–811. November 1969.
- "No One Can Endure on Borrowed Light". Relief Society Magazine. 57 (11): 808–810. November 1970.
- "Women and the Scriptures". Ensign. March 1971.

The Church of Jesus Christ of Latter-day Saints titles
Preceded by Marcia K. Howells	First Counselor in the general presidency of the Relief Society; April 6, 1945 – October 3, 1974	Succeeded by Janath R. Cannon
Relief Society Magazine titles
Preceded by Belle S. Spafford	Editor; 1945–1970	Magazine discontinued
