= Annie Taylor Hyde =

American academic

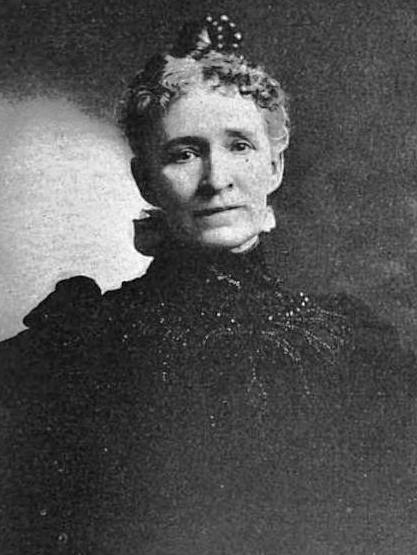

First Counselor in the general presidency of the Relief Society
- November 10, 1901 – March 12, 1909
- Called by: Bathsheba W. Smith
- Predecessor: Jane S. Richards
- Successor: Clarissa S. Williams

1st President of the Daughters of the Utah Pioneers

In office
- April 11, 1901 – April 11, 1903
- Predecessor: First
- Successor: Alice Merrill Horne

Personal details
- Born: Anna Maria Ballantyne Taylor; October 21, 1849; Salt Lake City, Provisional State of Deseret, United States
- Died: March 12, 1909 (aged 59); Salt Lake City, Utah, United States
- Cause of death: Stomach cancer
- Resting place: Salt Lake City Cemetery; 40.777°N 111.858°W
- Alma mater: University of Deseret
- Spouse(s): Alonzo Eugene Hyde
- Children: 8
- Parents: John Taylor; Jane Ballantyne

Anna Maria Ballantyne "Annie" Taylor Hyde (October 21, 1849 – March 12, 1909) was the founder and first president of the Daughters of Utah Pioneers and was a women's leader in the Church of Jesus Christ of Latter-day Saints (LDS Church).

Anna Maria Ballantyne Taylor was born in a Mormon pioneer wagon shortly after her parents, LDS Church apostle John Taylor and Jane Ballantyne, had arrived in the Salt Lake Valley. Taylor's mother, Jane Ballantyne Taylor, was a sister of Richard Ballantyne, the founder of the LDS Sunday School. Taylor was educated at the University of Deseret. In December 1870, she married Alonzo Eugene Hyde, a son of Orson Hyde, in the Endowment House in Salt Lake City.

On April 11, 1901, she invited 54 other women to join her in creating Daughters of the Utah Pioneers, an organization that would "perpetuate the names and achievements of the men, women and children who were the pioneers in founding this commonwealth [Utah]". Hyde was elected the first president of the organization, and she held this position until her death.

Later in 1901, Hyde was asked by Bathsheba W. Smith to become her first counselor in the general presidency of the Relief Society, the LDS Church organization of women. Hyde also served in this capacity until her death. As a member of the Relief Society general presidency, Hyde represented the Relief Society at meetings of the National Council of Women.

Annie Taylor Hyde and her husband were the parents of eight children. One of their daughters, Annie Laura Hyde, married Joseph F. Merrill, who later became an apostle in the LDS Church.

Annie Taylor Hyde died in Salt Lake City from stomach cancer, aged 59.

== See also ==
- Maria Young Dougall

== Notes ==
The Church of Jesus Christ of Latter-day Saints titles
Preceded by Jane S. Richards	First Counselor in the general presidency of the Relief Society; November 10, 1901–March 12, 1909	Succeeded by Clarissa S. Williams
Non-profit organization positions
First	1st President of the Daughters of the Utah Pioneers; April 11, 1901–April 11, 1903	Succeeded by Alice Merrill Horne
