= Jane S. Richards =

First Counselor in the general presidency of the Relief Society
- October 11, 1888 – November 10, 1901
- Called by: Zina D. H. Young
- Predecessor: Zina D. H. Young
- Successor: Annie Taylor Hyde

Personal details
- Born: Jane Snyder; January 31, 1823; Pamelia, New York, United States
- Died: November 17, 1912 (aged 89); Ogden, Utah, United States
- Resting place: Ogden City Cemetery; 41.233°N 111.962°W
- Spouse(s): Franklin D. Richards
- Children: 6, including: Franklin S. Richards
- Parents: Isaac Snyder; Lovisa Comstock
- Signature

Jane Snyder Richards (January 31, 1823 – November 17, 1912) was a counselor to Zina D. H. Young in the general presidency of the Relief Society of the Church of Jesus Christ of Latter-day Saints (LDS Church) from 1888 to 1901.

== Early life and family ==
Jane Snyder was born to Isaac Richards Snyder and his wife Lovisa Comstock in Parmelia, Jefferson County, New York.

By her early teens her family had moved to Addington County, Upper Canada. While there her parents and siblings joined The Church of Jesus Christ of Latter-day Saints. They were taught about the Church by John E. Page. Jane did not join until January 1840. Passing through a severe illness that had left her paralyzed and speechless, Jane only regained her speech after the prayers of her brother at the age of 17. Her baptism was performed by her brother Robert Snyder after cutting the ice at LaPorte, Indiana. The townspeople opposed her baptism because Richards awoke gravely ill the day before. She came up out of the water healed from her ailment rather than more sick from exposure.

On December 18, 1842, she married Franklin D. Richards. They had six children, including Franklin S. Richards. The Richards came to Utah Territory in 1848 after much persecution and sickness in Nauvoo.

== Church service ==
Richards was a member of the original Relief Society that was established in 1842 in Nauvoo, Illinois. She served on the General Board (called the Central Board until 1892) of the Relief Society from 1888 to 1910. She was a counselor to general president Zina D. H. Young from 1888 to 1901. Richards was the Relief Society delegate to the National Council of Women in 1891.

Richards also served as president of a local Relief Society in Weber County, Utah. When this Relief Society was formed, it was the first Relief Society to be created between the general organization and the most local ward-level organizations.

Richards's daughter, Josephine Richards West, served as a counselor in the general presidency of the Primary.

Richards died at West's home in Ogden, Utah on November 17, 1912.

== In memory ==
To honor the memory of Jane S. Richards, members of the Weber Stake planted a green ash tree next to the former Relief Society Hall which was built as a result of the efforts of Mrs. Richards. A sketch of her life was written, concealed inside a bottle and placed at the root of the tree by Miss Virginia Richards Burton.

== Notes ==
- Jenson, Andrew (1936). Latter-day Saint biographical encyclopedia: A compilation of biographical sketches of prominent men and women in the Church of Jesus Christ of Latter-Day Saints. Vol. 4. Salt Lake City, Utah: The Andrew Jenson History Company (Printed by The Deseret News Press). p. 195.
- Gates, Susa Young (1911). History of the Young Ladies' Mutual Improvement Association of the Church of Jesus Christ of L.D.S., from November 1869 to June 1910: Jane S. Richards. General Board of Y.L.M.I.A. p. 56.

The Church of Jesus Christ of Latter-day Saints titles
Preceded by Zina D. H. Young	First Counselor in the general presidency of the Relief Society; October 11, 1888–November 10, 1901	Succeeded by Annie Taylor Hyde
