= Relief Society Magazine =

Former official publication of the LDS Church

The Relief Society Magazine
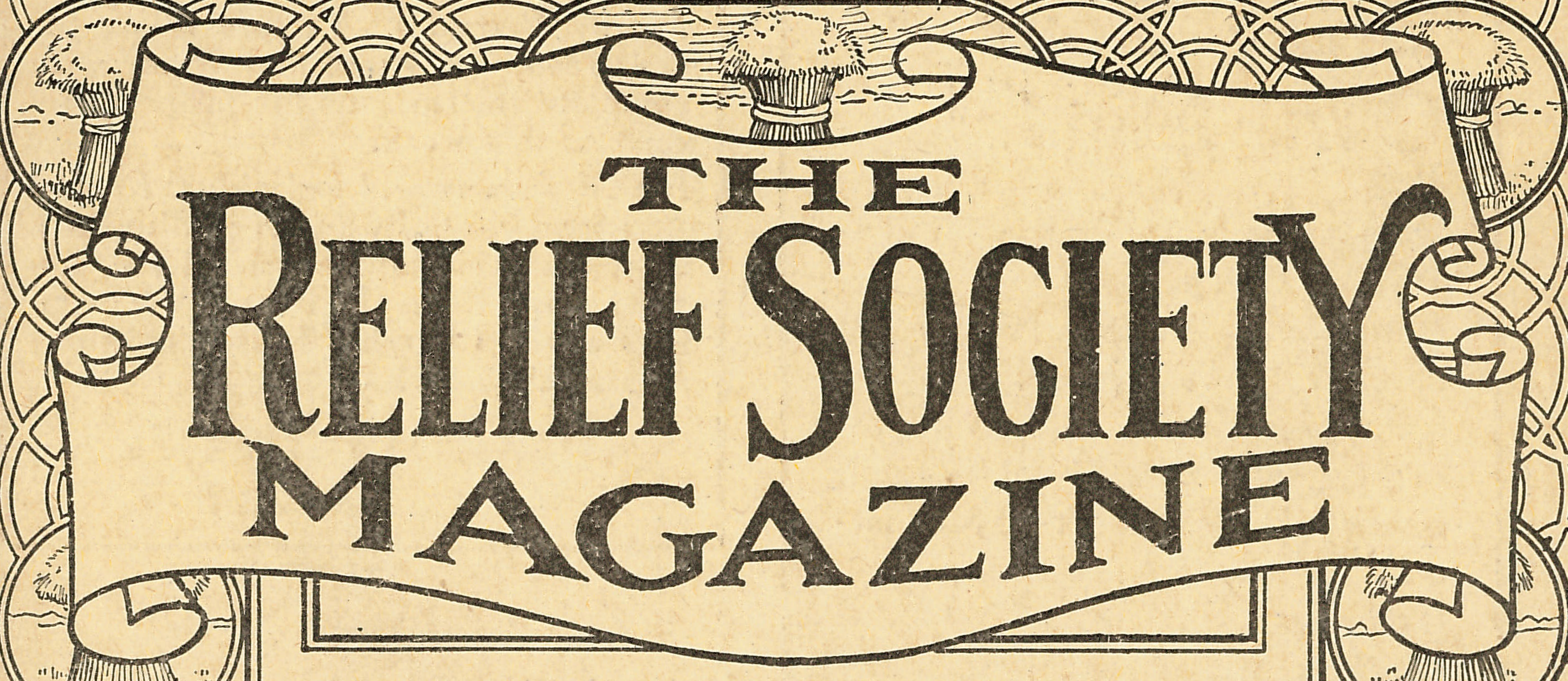

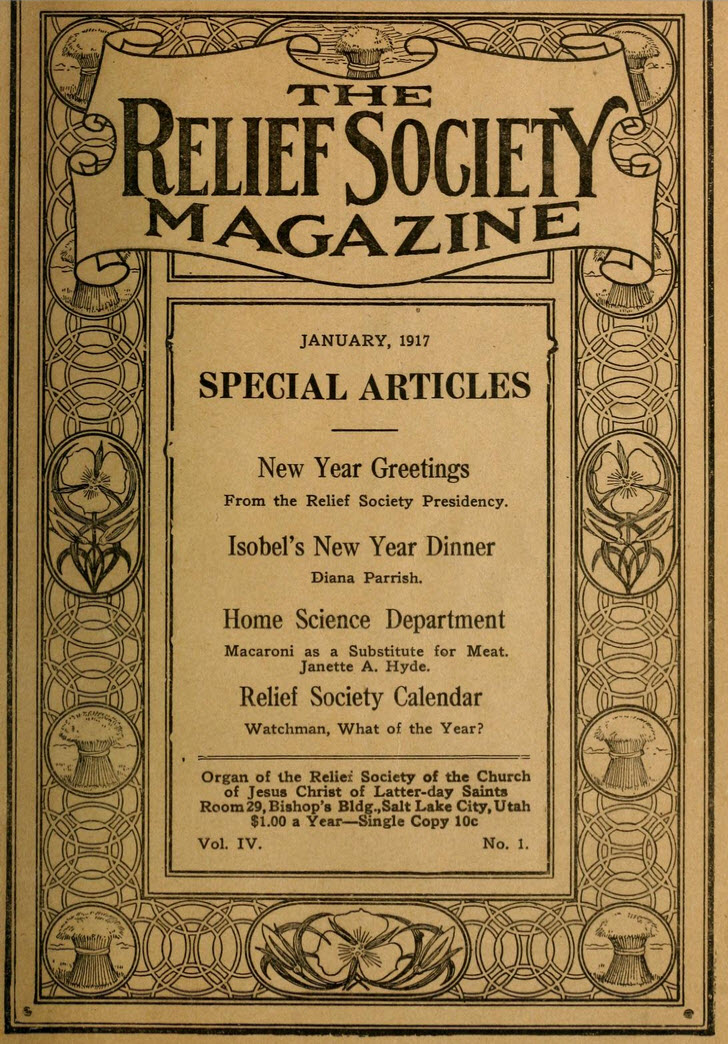
- Relief Society Magazine cover 1917
- Categories: Religion
- Frequency: Monthly
- Founder: Susa Young Gates
- Founded: 1915
- Final issue Number: December 1970; Vol 57 No 12
- Company: The Church of Jesus Christ of Latter-day Saints
- Country: United States
- Language: English

Relief Society Magazine was the official publication of the Relief Society of the Church of Jesus Christ of Latter-day Saints (LDS Church) from 1915 to 1970. It succeeded the earlier and privately owned Woman's Exponent, which was begun in 1872. The magazine was an important publishing outlet for Utah women, and was run by women editors. The founding editor, Susa Young Gates, edited the magazine from 1915 to 1922. The December 1970 issue of the Relief Society Magazine was its last. The LDS Church discontinued the magazine as part of the implementation of the Priesthood Correlation Program. Thus, the magazine and several others within the church were replaced by the Ensign.

== History ==
Relief Society Magazine started with the Relief Society Bulletin of 1914, starting the same year that Woman's Exponent stopped. The Bulletin was renamed Relief Society Magazine in 1915.

Though Woman's Exponent was incredibly popular with subscriptions exceeding 4,000, Susa Young Gates believed the Relief Society could reach even more people by changing the format of their distributions. At the turn of the twentieth century, magazines became the preferred means of distributing literature because they were more accessible to a wider audience. The magazine began as a black and white one dollar pocketbook but began printing in color in 1962.

After World War II, the Relief Society Magazine began publishing pro-motherhood and anti-work themes in its pages. This style, while influenced by the culture of the nation, also influence the domestic motherhood sentiment among women in The Church. However, not all subscribers were persuaded. Certain women working at the Manti Parachute Plant in Manti, Utah vocalized their belief that women could handle the workforce and domestic care.

=== Editors ===
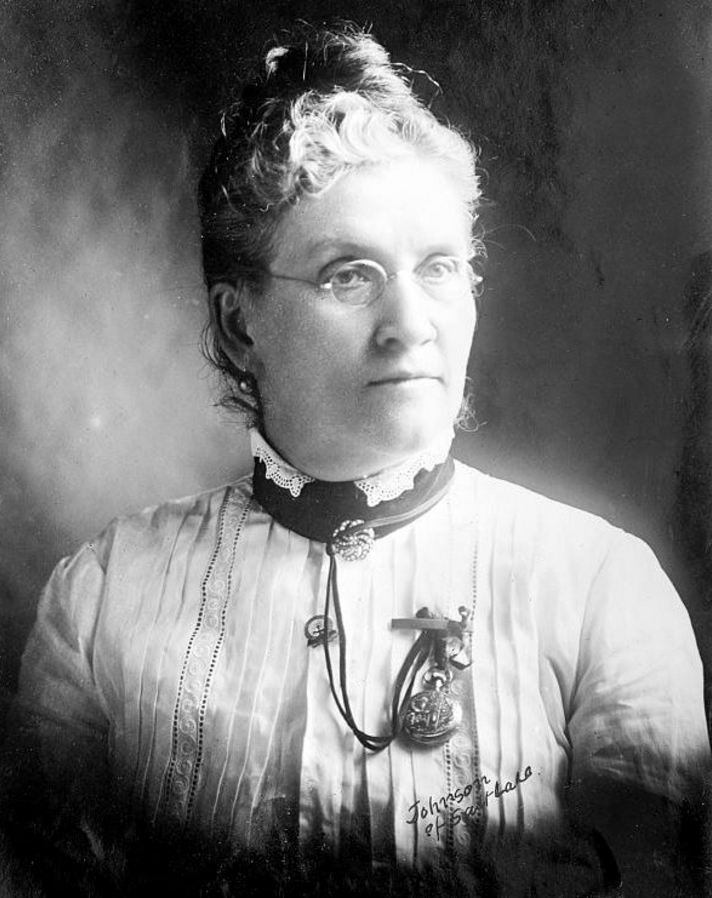
Susa Young Gates, founder and first editor of The Relief Society Magazine

- Susa Young Gates (1915–1922) (she was also editor of the Relief Society Bulletin)
- Clarissa Smith Williams (1923–1928)
- Alice Louise Reynolds (1928–1930)
- Mary Connelly Kimball (1930–1937)
- Belle S. Spafford (1937–1945)
- Marianne C. Sharp (1945–1970)

==== Associate Editors ====
- Alice Louise Reynolds (1923–1928)
- Louise Y. Robison (1933–1934)
- Marianne C. Sharp (1943–1945)
- Vesta P. Crawford (1945–1970)

=== Circulation ===
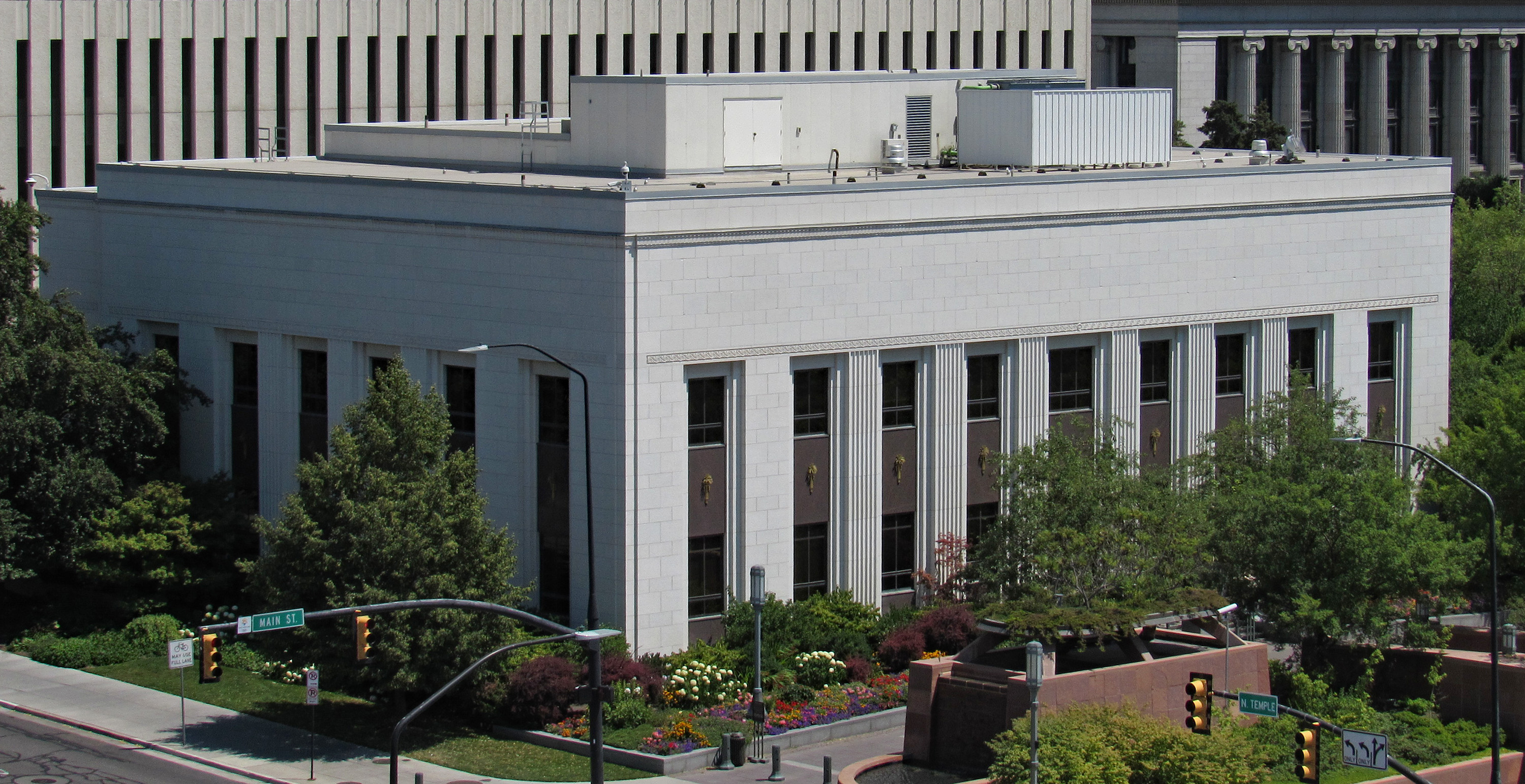
The Relief Society Building, built in 1956, was where the magazine was printed until its discontinuation.

The Relief Society Magazine was distributed and printed from the Relief Society Office Building in Salt Lake City, Utah. Statistics come from "A History of the Relief Society Magazine."

Starting in 1966, the Relief Society began publishing a Spanish edition of the magazine to reach the ever-growing Hispanic population of The Church. This contributed to the massive increase in subscribers in the late 1960s.

Relief Society Magazine Circulation
Year	1930	1931	1932	1933	1935	1937	1941	1943	1945	1947	1967	1970
Number of Subscribers	26,509	24,956	20,012	24,157	35,899	41,721	55,500	57,000	73,000	83,000	260,000	298,250

== Content ==
There was a wide variety of content available for the subscribers of the magazine, the curriculums and lessons, the "Notes from the Field," contests, the most famous of which was the Eliza R. Snow Poetry competition. After World War II the magazine shifted focus from political activities and global missionary work to sewing projects and charity organizations. Additionally, the magazine was the inspiration for many songs including "Our Magazine."

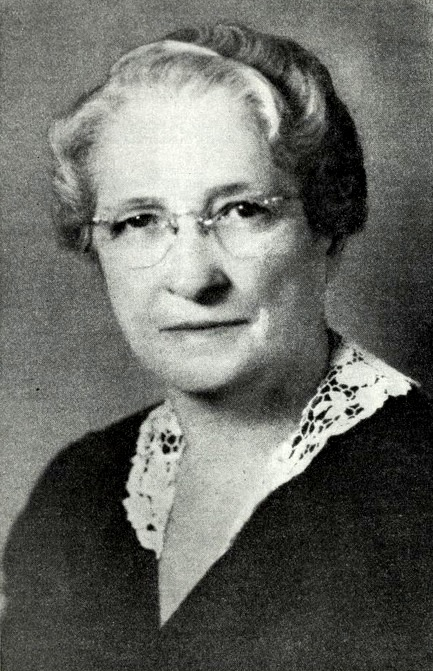
Amy Brown Lyman, author of "Notes from the Field" and eighth General Relief Society President

=== Relief Society Curriculums/Lessons ===
The magazine dispersed the monthly Relief Society Curriculums illustrating what each lesson was to be on. Lesson topics ranged from bible chapters for home reading to the importance of theatre and the arts to the role Jesus as savior. These lessons were to be taught be designated instructors during the weekly meetings of the Relief Society organization in the various congregations throughout the world. An instruction circular advised Relief Society stakes that wards should prioritize the official curricula, writing that they would be "mistaken" to "reject that which has been prepared by proper authority." Susa Young Gates initially wrote the monthly lessons for genealogy.

=== "Notes from the Field" ===
Early on, the magazine was nearly as far reaching as the Church of Jesus Christ of Latter-day Saints (LDS Church). The most reliable way this happened was through the paid subscriptions of missionaries that were spread throughout the globe. The magazine began incorporating this diversified readership through a regular column titled "Notes from the Field", which described some of the experiences that missionaries around the world were having. This column spanned nearly two decades, lasting from the magazine's beginnings in 1915 until its last edition in 1934. Amy Brown Lyman (pictured) wrote and edited this column for the majority of its existence.

One example of just how far the magazine was carried can be found in the July 1923 issue. In the "Notes from the Field" section of this issue, missionaries are pictured with the officers of the Relief Society in Aleppo, Syria (then part of the French mandated State of Aleppo). The magazine's importance in the lives of those missionaries was evidenced by the experiences of the missionaries. In the diary of Joseph W. Booth, one of the pictured missionaries in Syria, he recounts the time he received that July edition, and showed it to the local members.

In addition there was a column entitled "Notes to the Field" which gave official instructions and guidance straight from the Presidency of the Relief Society to the wards and organizations throughout the world.

=== Contests ===
To promote literary excellence among church members, in 1923 the magazine began hosting its first poetry contest. Contestants would submit their work to the magazine, which would then vote and reward a winner whose work would be featured in the next magazine. The contests portion expanded to include the Eliza R. Snow Poetry Contest, changed to the Relief Society Poem contest in 1967, the song contest in 1933 and again in 1968, and the Relief Society Short Story Contest which began in 1942 to celebrate the centennial of the Relief Society Organization.

== Discontinuation ==
There were many factors that contributed to the eventual discontinuation of the Relief Society Magazine in 1970. A continually growing global audience, expansion of male authorship, and a limited access to all writers all played a significant role; however, these all culminated in the Priesthood Correlation Program in December 1970. As a way to create uniformity within The Church, leadership created the Ensign and the New Era and discontinued a variety of publications besides the Relief Society Magazine. These included the Improvement Era, the Millennial Star, and The Instructor.

Though the magazine contained inclusive columns such as "Notes from the Field", these still told the international stories from the perspective of the American missionaries. The magazine overall was not made to incorporate an international audience- at least until the addition of the Spanish version of the magazine in 1966. The number of authors who were men steadily increased throughout the magazine's lifespan. Just 20% of articles were written by men in 1930, but that number jumped to 33% in 1956. The Relief Society Curriculum section of the magazine also had 75% of the lessons written by men in that same year. The previously published Woman's Exponent contained articles written by everyday members of The Church. Conversely, the Relief Society Magazine contained articles written by Church leadership, specifically being controlled by the Relief Society Organization.

== Legacy ==
Despite the magazines shortcomings in securing ordinary members and female authorship, when the magazine was discontinued many women refused subscriptions to the new Ensign. When an eighty-four year old woman lost her sight due to age, she wrote the magazine in March 1969 saying:

Dear Relief Society Magazine: It is with regret and tears that I must say good-bye. My sight is so bad and no repairs can be given it, so I cannot read you anymore. For thirty years and more I have enjoyed you, but now I am unable to read the wonderful stories and articles. Good-bye Magazine. I hate so to see you go...

== See also ==
- List of Latter Day Saint periodicals
- Mormon feminism
