= Amy B. Lyman =

American politician and religious leader

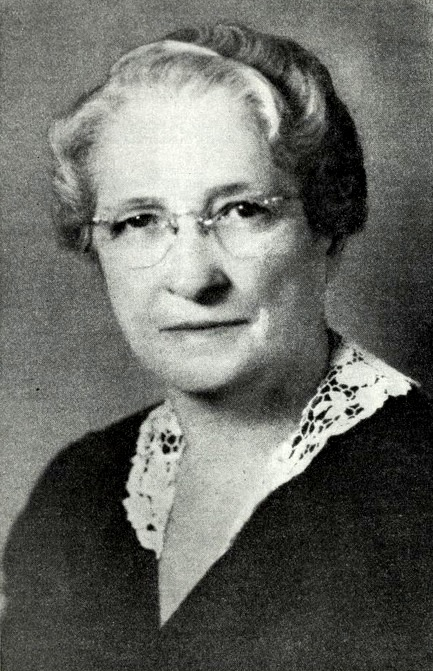

8th Relief Society General President
- January 1, 1940 – April 6, 1945
- Called by: Heber J. Grant
- Predecessor: Louise Y. Robison
- Successor: Belle S. Spafford
- End reason: Honorably released upon request

First Counselor in the Relief Society General Presidency
- October 7, 1928 – January 1, 1940
- Called by: Louise Y. Robison
- Predecessor: Jennie B. Knight
- Successor: Marcia K. Howells

Personal details
- Born: Amy Cassandra Brown; February 7, 1872; Pleasant Grove, Utah Territory, United States
- Died: December 5, 1959 (aged 87); Salt Lake City, Utah, United States
- Resting place: Wasatch Lawn Memorial Park; 40°41′52.08″N 111°50′30.12″W
- Spouse(s): Richard R. Lyman
- Children: Wendell Brown and Margaret
- Parents: John Brown; Margaret Zimmerman

Amy Cassandra Brown Lyman (February 7, 1872 – December 5, 1959) was the eighth general president of the Relief Society of The Church of Jesus Christ of Latter-day Saints (LDS Church) from 1940 to 1945. Lyman also served a term as a member of the 14th Utah State Legislature from 1923 to 1924.

== Early life ==
Amy Cassandra Brown was born in Pleasant Grove, Utah Territory on February 7, 1872, to John Brown and Margaret Zimmerman Brown. John Brown was a polygamist, and Amy Brown was the twenty-third of his twenty-five children. He was also a leader of the Mississippi Latter-day Saints, a group of pioneers who traveled to Utah.

Amy Brown attended high school at Brigham Young Academy (BYA) from 1888 to 1890. For part of her time at BYA, Brown lived in the home of Karl G. and Anna Meith Maeser. Maeser appointed Brown to head the Primary Department at BYA; she worked as a teacher at BYA from 1890 to 1894, and later taught elementary school in Salt Lake City for two years.

== Marriage ==
Lyman in 1914

At BYA she met Richard Lyman, her future husband who would become an LDS Church apostle in 1918. Brown and Lyman's plans to marry were postponed because the University of Michigan, where Lyman was studying, did not allow married students. After Lyman graduated in 1896, the couple was married in the Salt Lake Temple in a ceremony performed by Joseph F. Smith. The couple had two children, Wendell Brown and Margaret.

After their marriage, Richard Lyman became a professor of engineering at the University of Utah. Amy Lyman took classes from the university, including English and history. In 1902, the Lymans went to New York so that he could begin his graduate studies at Cornell University. On their way, they went to a summer session at the University of Chicago. While in Chicago, Lyman enrolled in a class on sociology. She became involved in Settlement House programs and associated with Jane Addams. After her husband graduated from Cornell University, the Lymans returned to Utah.

Prior to the Second World War, Lyman accompanied her husband to England where he was president of the church's European Mission from 1936 to 1938. In Europe, Lyman presided over women's organizations.

== LDS Church service ==
=== Relief Society ===
Lyman became a member of the Relief Society general board in 1909. She served as both assistant secretary and, later, as general secretary-treasurer. In this role, she collected historical documents, while promoting the use of modern office machinery and practices, such as filing systems.

Lyman (at right) in 1924 as general secretary of the Relief Society, with the other members of the presidency of the organization

While on the general board, she established Social Service Department under Joseph F. Smith's authorization. From 1928 to 1940, Lyman was the first counselor to the president Louise Y. Robison in the Relief Society general presidency. As a counselor, she helped transfer stored wheat collected from the time of Brigham Young to the General Welfare Program. She also assisted in the centennial celebration of Relief Society. Lyman succeeded Robison as president in 1940 and served until 1945.

Lyman received numerous honors including election to the Social Science Honor Society of America, the Distinguished Alumnus Award from Brigham Young University (BYU), honorary membership in the American Association of Mental Deficiency, and the Honorary Life Membership Award from the Utah State Conference of Social Work.

In 1943, the First Presidency discovered that Richard Lyman had carried on a relationship with another woman since 1925, for which he was excommunicated on November 12, 1943, for violations of the law of chastity. Lyman was "devastated" and "crushed" by the news, but ultimately resolved not to seek a divorce.

Amy Brown Lyman when she was called as counselor to Louise Y. Robison in 1928

When Amy returned to work at the Relief Society, a week after the news broke, David O. McKay, second counselor in the First Presidency, "escorted her to the Relief Society offices so that her return after the excommunication of her husband would not be so difficult." McKay had urged her to perform her duties "in order to get her mind off her troubles."

The incident proved to be too much of a distraction, however, and Lyman requested to be released as Relief Society general president. She was honorably released on April 6, 1945, and was succeeded by her second counselor, Belle S. Spafford.

=== Social welfare department ===
Part of Lyman's work in the Relief Society included her contributions to the LDS Church's social welfare department. Lyman studied at the University of Colorado and earned a certificate in social service. She was a member of the State Council on Defense in Utah and was chair of its social service committee. She was selected to be a delegate to the National Conference of Social Work in June 1917.

In 1919, Lyman founded and headed the Relief Society Social Service Department as part of the church's Relief Society program. She would head the department for 16 years. In 1973, the organization became a corporation separate from the church's Relief Society and was renamed LDS Social Services. (The organization has since been renamed Family Services.)

As head of the Social Service Department, Lyman created a training program in which stake delegates attended classes in family welfare work. They would then return to their stakes to teach these lessons to the members of the church. Over 4,000 students were trained through the curriculum she established for those classes.

== Utah House of Representatives ==
Lyman served a term as a member of the 14th Utah State Legislature from 1923 to 1924. As a representative, she pushed for statewide support of the federal Sheppard–Towner Act, which provided for federally financed instruction in maternal and infant health care and gave matching funds to individual U.S. states to build women's health care clinics. The Sheppard–Towner Act was one of the most significant achievements of Progressive Era maternalist reformers.

== Other contributions ==
Throughout her life, Lyman was involved with the American Red Cross. She attended a Red Cross training seminar on welfare work in Colorado in 1917, and by 1918 she was a trustee and vice-president of her community clinic, organizer of the Municipal Department of Health and Charity, chairperson of the Family Consultation Committee of the Red Cross and the vice-president of the Utah State Welfare Commission. She also participated in national organizations like the American Child Hygiene Association, Home Services Institute, American Association for Mental Deficiency and the National Tuberculosis Association. Under her influence, BYU created its first classes in family welfare work. She was also involved with the National Council of Women. She contributed to the establishment of the Utah State Training School in 1929, for whom she was a trustee for eleven years.

Lyman raised her granddaughter, Amy Kathryn Lyman (daughter of Lyman's son, Wendell), after Lyman's daughter-in-law was killed in 1924. Her son, Wendell, died by suicide in 1933. Her husband was later re-baptized into the church in 1954. Lyman died on December 5, 1959 in the house of her daughter where she had been recovering from a fall.

== Works ==
Lyman wrote a number of articles for the Relief Society Magazine.

The Church of Jesus Christ of Latter-day Saints titles
Preceded by Louise Y. Robison	Relief Society General President; January 1, 1940 – April 6, 1945	Succeeded by Belle S. Spafford
Preceded by Jennie B. Knight	First Counselor in the Relief; Society General Presidency; October 7, 1928 – January 1, 1940	Succeeded by Marcia K. Howells
