= Sarah M. Cleveland =

First Counselor of the General Presidency of the Relief Society
- March 17, 1842 – 1844
- Called by: Emma Smith
- Successor: Zina D. H. Young

Personal details
- Born: Sarah Marietta Kingsley; October 20, 1788; Becket, Massachusetts, United States
- Died: 1856; Plymouth, Illinois, United States
- Spouse(s): John Howe; John Cleveland
- Parents: Ebenezer Kingsley

Sarah Marietta Kingsley Cleveland (October 20, 1788 – 1856) was the first counselor to Emma Smith in the presidency of the Relief Society from 1842 to 1844.

Cleveland was born in Becket, Berkshire County, Massachusetts to Ebenezer Kingsley. She was married to John Cleveland and later to the Mormon prophet Joseph Smith. Her husband was a judge in Nauvoo, Illinois, and unlike her did not join the Church of Jesus Christ of Latter Day Saints; he was a Swedenborgian. Cleveland remained in Nauvoo with her husband when the main body of the Latter Day Saints moved to what later became Utah Territory.

== Marriage to Joseph Smith ==
A letter from John L. Smith, Sarah Kingsley’s son-in-law, to the First Presidency, dated March 8, 1895, states: "In the days of Joseph. Mother [Sarah M. Kingsley (Howe)] Cleveland by advice, was sealed to the prophet in Nauvoo but lived with her [non-LDS] husband John Cleveland." Sarah was also resealed to Joseph Smith vicariously in the Nauvoo Temple in 1846.

== Sources ==
- Encyclopedia of Mormonism p. 1635.
- 2005 Deseret Morning News Church Alamanac (Deseret Morning News: Salt Lake City, Utah, 2004) p. 115
- Jenson, Andrew (1936). Latter-day Saint biographical encyclopedia: A compilation of biographical sketches of prominent men and women in the Church of Jesus Christ of Latter-Day Saints. Vol. 4. Salt Lake City, Utah: The Andrew Jenson Memorial Association (Printed by The Deseret News Press). pp. 5796 183. ISBN 1-58958-026-5.

Church of Jesus Christ of Latter Day Saints titles
| First | First Counselor in the general presidency of the Relief Society; 1842 – 1844 | Vacant Title next held by Zina D. H. Young as First Counselor in the general presidency of the Relief Society of The Church of Jesus Christ of Latter-day Saints |
