= Clarissa S. Williams =

American LDS Church religious leader (1859–1930)

- Williams in 1921 upon being called as President of the Relief Society

6th Relief Society General President
- April 2, 1921 – October 7, 1928
- Called by: Heber J. Grant
- Predecessor: Emmeline B. Wells
- Successor: Louise Y. Robison

First Counselor in the Relief Society General Presidency
- October 3, 1910 – April 2, 1921
- Called by: Emmeline B. Wells
- Predecessor: Annie Taylor Hyde
- Successor: Jennie B. Knight

Treasurer of the General Presidency of the Relief Society
- 1901 – October 3, 1910
- Called by: Bathsheba W. Smith

Personal details
- Born: Clarissa Smith; April 21, 1859; Salt Lake City, Utah Territory, United States
- Died: March 8, 1930 (aged 70); Salt Lake City, Utah, United States
- Cause of death: Nephritis
- Resting place: Salt Lake City Cemetery; 40.777°N 111.858°W
- Spouse(s): William N. Williams
- Children: 11
- Parents: George A. Smith; Susan E. West

Clarissa Smith Williams (April 21, 1859 – March 8, 1930) was the sixth Relief Society General President of the Church of Jesus Christ of Latter-day Saints (LDS Church) from 1921 to 1928. Williams was the first native of Utah to serve in this role.

== Biography ==
Clarissa Smith was born in Salt Lake City, Utah Territory, to Susan West, the seventh wife of LDS Church apostle George A. Smith.

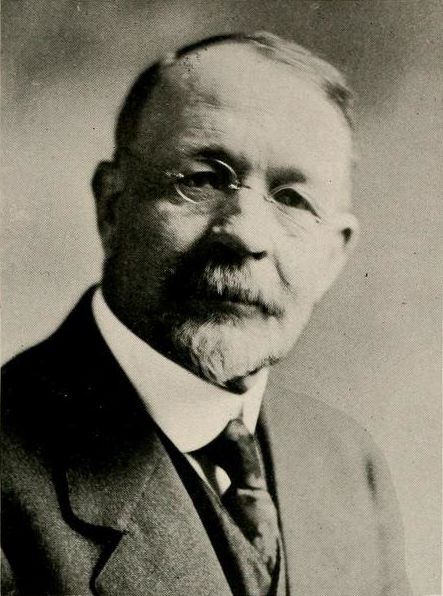
William N. Williams, Clarissa's husband, served six terms in the Utah State Legislature

Williams married William N. Williams on July 17, 1877, and was the mother of eleven children (including George Albert, Bathsheba, Lyman, Clarissa, Sarah, Eva, Georgia).

In 1901, Williams was called to serve as treasurer of the Relief Society by Bathsheba W. Smith, first wife of George A. Smith. Williams served in this position until 1910, when she became the first counselor to president Emmeline B. Wells in the Relief Society general presidency. She held this position until 1921, when she was called to succeed Wells as president after the death of Wells.

Due to failing health, in 1928, Williams became the first general president to ask to be released from her calling and she was succeeded by Louise Y. Robison. At the October general conference of the Relief Society she stated, "You will recollect that it has always been my policy to advocate to you that we do not retain our positions too long, that there are many capable women and that such honor and dignity as comes with positions of this kind, should rotate."

Williams died of nephritis in Salt Lake City and was buried in the Salt Lake City Cemetery.

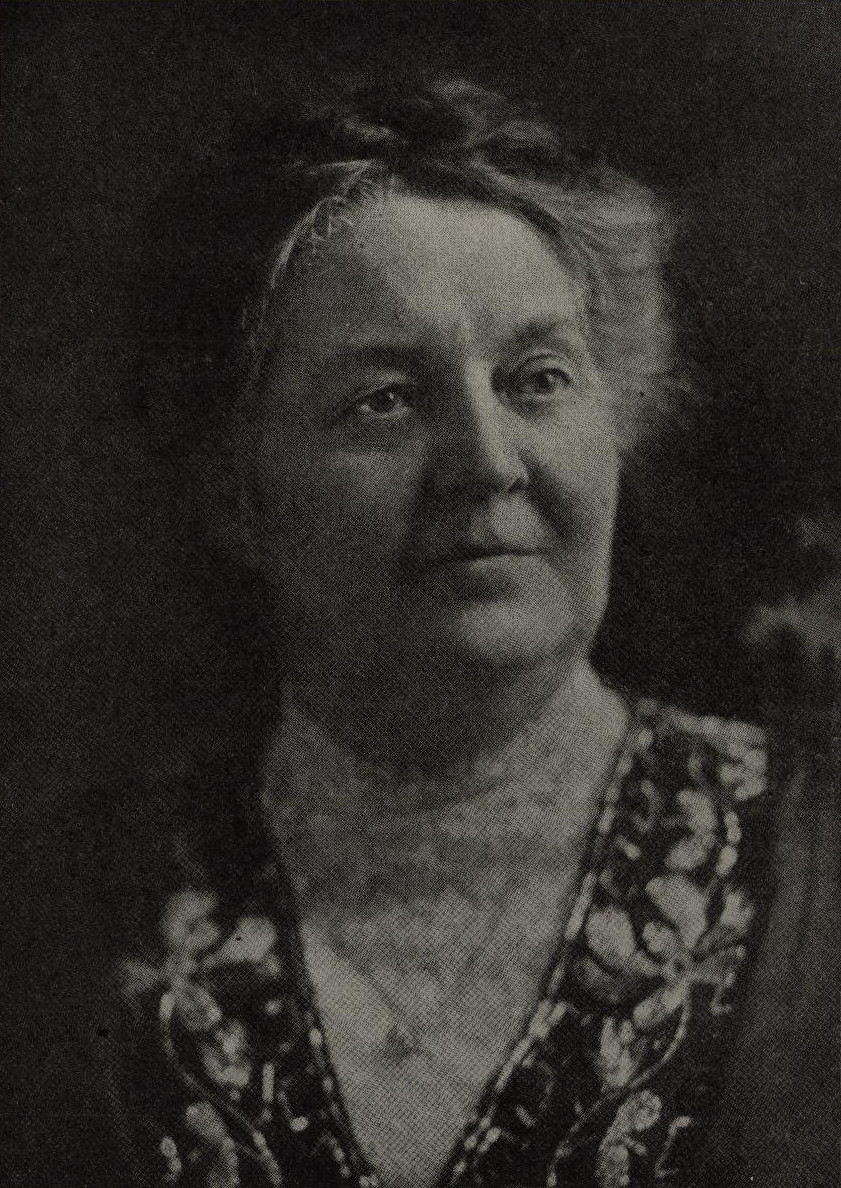
Williams around 1914 while she was serving as first counselor to Emmeline B. Wells

== Publications in the Relief Society Magazine ==
=== Articles ===
- "Epistle to the Relief Society Concerning these War Times". Relief Society Magazine. 4 (7): 362–366. July 1917.
- "A Word of Counsel". Relief Society Magazine. 4 (12): 705–706. December 1917.
- "Report of Utah State Conservation Committee". Relief Society Magazine. 5 (1): 35–38. January 1918.
- "Annual Greetings". Relief Society Magazine. 6 (1): 49–51. January 1919.
- "Greeting". Relief Society Magazine. 9 (1): 1. January 1922.
- "Resignation of Mrs. Susa Young Gates". Relief Society Magazine. 8 (8): 440. August 1922.
- "Greeting". Relief Society Magazine. 9 (11): 564–567. November 1922.
- "Relief Society Conference Address Saturday Afternoon". Relief Society Magazine. 10 (3): 137. March 1923.
- "Response". Relief Society Magazine. 11 (11): 575–576. November 1924.
- "Response". Relief Society Magazine. 11 (11): 575–576. November 1924.
- "To Our Beloved Sisters". Relief Society Magazine. 11 (12): 601. December 1924.

The Church of Jesus Christ of Latter-day Saints titles
Preceded by Emmeline B. Wells	Relief Society General President; April 2, 1921–October 7, 1928	Succeeded by Louise Y. Robison
Preceded by Annie Taylor Hyde	First Counselor in the Relief Society General Presidency; October 3, 1910–April 2, 1921	Succeeded by Jennie B. Knight
