= List of general presidencies of the Relief Society =

This list of general presidencies of the Relief Society includes the general president and the counselors of the Relief Society General Presidency of the Church of Jesus Christ of Latter-day Saints.

No.	Dates	General President	First Counselor	Second Counselor
1	March 17, 1842 – 1844	Emma Smith	Sarah M. Cleveland	Elizabeth Ann Whitney
2	December 1866 – December 5, 1887	Eliza R. Snow	Sole churchwide leader until presidency reorganized June 19, 1880	
2	December 1866 – December 5, 1887	Eliza R. Snow	Zina D. H. Young (1880-87)	Elizabeth Ann Whitney (1880-82)
2	December 1866 – December 5, 1887	Eliza R. Snow	Zina D. H. Young (1880-87)	None (1882-87)
3	April 8, 1888 – August 28, 1901	Zina D. H. Young	Jane S. Richards	Bathsheba W. Smith
4	November 10, 1901 – September 20, 1910	Bathsheba W. Smith	Annie Taylor Hyde (1901–09)	Ida S. Dusenberry
4	November 10, 1901 – September 20, 1910	Bathsheba W. Smith	None (1909–10)	Ida S. Dusenberry
5	October 3, 1910 – April 2, 1921	Emmeline B. Wells	Clarissa S. Williams	Julina L. Smith
6	April 2, 1921 – October 7, 1928	Clarissa S. Williams	Jennie B. Knight	Louise Y. Robison
7	October 7, 1928 – December 31, 1939	Louise Y. Robison	Amy B. Lyman	Julia A. Child (1928–35)
7	October 7, 1928 – December 31, 1939	Louise Y. Robison	Amy B. Lyman	Kate M. Barker (1935–39)
8	January 1, 1940 – April 6, 1945	Amy B. Lyman	Marcia K. Howells	Donna D. Sorensen (1940–42)
8	January 1, 1940 – April 6, 1945	Amy B. Lyman	Marcia K. Howells	Belle S. Spafford (1942–45)
9	April 6, 1945 – October 3, 1974	Belle S. Spafford	Marianne C. Sharp	Gertrude R. Garff (1945–47)
9	April 6, 1945 – October 3, 1974	Belle S. Spafford	Marianne C. Sharp	Velma N. Simonsen (1947–56)
9	April 6, 1945 – October 3, 1974	Belle S. Spafford	Marianne C. Sharp	Helen W. Anderson (1957–58)
9	April 6, 1945 – October 3, 1974	Belle S. Spafford	Marianne C. Sharp	Louise W. Madsen (1958–74)
10	October 3, 1974 – April 7, 1984	Barbara B. Smith	Janath R. Cannon (1974–78)	Marian R. Boyer (1974–78)
10	October 3, 1974 – April 7, 1984	Barbara B. Smith	Marian R. Boyer (1978–84)	Shirley W. Thomas (1978–83)
10	October 3, 1974 – April 7, 1984	Barbara B. Smith	Marian R. Boyer (1978–84)	Ann S. Reese (1983–84)
11	April 7, 1984 – March 31, 1990	Barbara W. Winder	Joy F. Evans	Joanne B. Doxey
12	March 31, 1990 – April 5, 1997	Elaine L. Jack	Chieko N. Okazaki	Aileen H. Clyde
13	April 5, 1997 – April 6, 2002	Mary Ellen W. Smoot	Virginia U. Jensen	Sheri L. Dew
14	April 6, 2002 – March 31, 2007	Bonnie D. Parkin	Kathleen H. Hughes	Anne C. Pingree
15	March 31, 2007 – March 31, 2012	Julie B. Beck	Silvia H. Allred	Barbara Thompson
16	March 31, 2012 – April 1, 2017	Linda K. Burton	Carole M. Stephens	Linda S. Reeves
17	April 1, 2017 – August 1, 2022	Jean B. Bingham	Sharon Eubank	Reyna I. Aburto
18	August 1, 2022	Camille N. Johnson	J. Anette Dennis	Kristin M. Yee
