= Louise Y. Robison =

American LDS Church religious leader

- Robison during her tenure as Relief Society General President

7th Relief Society General President
- October 7, 1928 – December 31, 1939
- Called by: Heber J. Grant
- Predecessor: Clarissa S. Williams
- Successor: Amy Brown Lyman

Second Counselor in the Relief Society General Presidency
- April 2, 1921 – October 7, 1928
- Called by: Clarissa S. Williams
- Predecessor: Juliana L. Smith
- Successor: Julia A. Child

Personal details
- Born: Sarah Louisa Yates Robison; May 27, 1866; Scipio, Utah Territory, United States
- Died: March 30, 1946 (aged 79); San Francisco, California, United States
- Resting place: Wasatch Lawn Memorial Park; 40.6978°N 111.8417°W
- Alma mater: Brigham Young Academy
- Spouse(s): Joseph L. Robison
- Parents: Thomas and Elizabeth F. Yates

Sarah Louisa Yates Robison (May 27, 1866 – March 30, 1946) was the seventh Relief Society General President of the Church of Jesus Christ of Latter-day Saints (LDS Church) from 1928 to 1939.

== Early life ==
Sarah Louisa "Louise" Yates was born to Thomas and Elizabeth Yates and was raised in Scipio, Utah Territory. Her parents had been asked to colonize Round Valley in Millard County, Utah. She was the second-oldest of their five children. Robison attended Brigham Young Academy for a year at the age of 14 and then took classes in dressmaking. She married Joseph L. Robison on October 11, 1883, at age 17 and became the mother of six children. Although she only had limited schooling, once her children were grown, Robison took classes from a university and would wake up at 4 am to study in the mornings. As a young mother, Robison was diagnosed with facial cancer, but her face healed without her having to undergo surgery.

== Church service ==
Robison served on the Relief Society General Board, where she directed the Temple and Burial Clothing Department. Before becoming president of the Relief Society in 1928, Robison served as the second counselor to her predecessor, Clarissa S. Williams. Robison was president of the organization during the Great Depression. Robison felt inadequate for the position of president due to her lack of education, but was able to identify with struggling sisters during the time period in which she served.

Robison was the first Relief Society president to give an address at a General Conference of The Church of Jesus Christ of Latter-day Saints in October 1929.She was also the first president who was able to travel overseas to visit the Relief Society organizations in Great Britain. In 1933 she was a delegate to the World Congress of the International Council of Women in Paris. That same year she was instrumental in the building of a monument to commemorate the Relief Society in Nauvoo, Illinois, although this monument was later relocated.

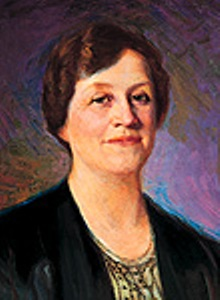
Portrait of Robison by John Willard Clawson

While serving, the church established their welfare program to help needy members in 1936. In 1937, Robison founded Mormon Handicraft, a non-profit organization that sold discounted clothing and blankets made by members of the Relief Society. (When the church announced plans to close the Mormon Handicraft store in 1986, it was purchased by Deseret Book.) During Robison's tenure, blue and gold were adopted as the official colors of the Relief Society. She was released from her position as the Relief Society president in 1939. In 1940, Robison was succeeded by her first counselor, Amy B. Lyman. She died in San Francisco and her funeral was held in the Salt Lake Assembly Hall.

== Publications ==
=== Articles ===
- "Resignation of Mrs. Susa Young Gates". Relief Society Magazine. 9 (8): 440. January 1922.
- "Greeting". Relief Society Magazine. 9 (1): 1. January 1922.
- "Our President's Visit". Relief Society Magazine. 17 (3): 123–124. March 1930.
- "Tributes to Clarissa Smith Williams". Relief Society Magazine. 17 (5): 223. May 1930.
- "Crusade Against the Use of Tobacco". Relief Society Magazine. 18 (6): 303. June 1931.
- "Vitalizing Resolutions". Relief Society Magazine. 19 (3): 153–154. March 1932.
- "Greeting". Relief Society Magazine. 20 (1): 48–49. January 1933.
- "Greetings". Relief Society Magazine. 21 (1): 51–52. January 1934.
- "National Council of Women". Relief Society Magazine. 24 (2): 71–72. February 1937.
- "Greetings". Relief Society Magazine. 25 (1): 54. January 1938.
- "Relief Society Singing Mothers". Relief Society Magazine. 25 (5): 291–292. December 1938.
- "National Stewardship Convention". Relief Society Magazine. 26 (1): 3–4. January 1939.
- "Welcome Your Tasks". Relief Society Magazine. 26 (3): 147–148. March 1939.
- "White House Conference on Children in a Democracy". Relief Society Magazine. 26 (6): 372–374. June 1939.
- "Jennie Brimhall Knight". Relief Society Magazine. 26 (12): 808–810. December 1939.

The Church of Jesus Christ of Latter-day Saints titles
Preceded by Clarissa S. Williams	Relief Society General President; October 7, 1928 – December 31, 1939	Succeeded by Amy B. Lyman
Preceded by Juliana L. Smith	Second Counselor in the Relief Society General Presidency; April 2, 1921 – October 7, 1928	Succeeded by Julia A. Child
