= Ida Smoot Dusenberry =

American Mormon leader (1873–1955)

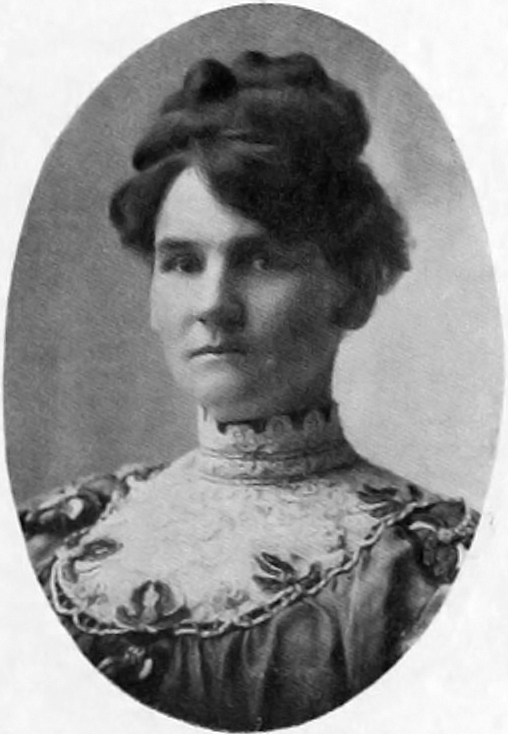

Second Counselor in the general presidency of the Relief Society
- November 10, 1901 – September 20, 1910
- Called by: Bathsheba W. Smith
- Predecessor: Bathsheba W. Smith
- Successor: Julina Lambson Smith

Personal details
- Born: Ida Maline Smoot; May 5, 1873; Salt Lake City, Utah Territory, United States
- Died: April 25, 1955 (aged 81); Provo, Utah, United States
- Resting place: Provo City Cemetery; 40.225°N 111.6444°W
- Spouse(s): George A. Dusenberry
- Children: 2
- Parents: Abraham O. Smoot; Anne K. Mauritsen

Ida Maline Smoot Dusenberry (May 5, 1873 – April 25, 1955) was a Utah educator and a leader in the Relief Society of the Church of Jesus Christ of Latter-day Saints (LDS Church).

== Biography ==
Ida Smoot was born in Salt Lake City, Utah Territory, to Abraham O. Smoot and Anne Kirstine Mauritsen on May 5, 1873. She was the sister of Reed Smoot and Brigham Smoot.

Dusenberry attended Brigham Young Academy in Provo beginning at age five, graduating in 1897. While in school she married George A. Dusenberry (1891) and became the mother of two children. She lost her mother, father, and husband during the next three years. Dusenberry was trained as a kindergarten teacher at Chauncy Hall School in Boston from 1898 to 1899. Upon her return to Provo, she became the principal of the Kindergarten Normal Training school and organized a class for parents. Dusenberry was appointed as vice president of Salt Lake's Women's Congress in 1900 and then served multiple terms as the president of the Utah State Kindergarten Association beginning the following year. In 1910 she spent three years in graduate school at Columbia University and during that time continued to speak at many national conferences. She also received a bachelor of pedagogy degree from Brigham Young University (BYU) in 1906. In 1921, Dusenberry became an assistant professor of psychology at BYU. She worked as a faculty member at BYU until retiring in 1943.

In 1901, Dusenberry became a member of the general presidency of the Relief Society; she was the second counselor to Bathsheba W. Smith. Dusenberry served in this capacity until Smith's death in 1910, when the presidency was dissolved. Dusenberry remained a member of the Relief Society general board until 1921. As a member of the general presidency and general board of the Relief Society, Dusenberry represented the Relief Society to the National Council of Women of the United States, the International Council of Women, the National Convention of Charities and Corrections, and the Suffrage Convention.

She died in Provo, Utah.

== Publications ==
- "The Secret Doors to Childhood". Relief Society Magazine. 7 (1): 33–35. January 1920.
- "The Will and the Way". Relief Society Magazine. 7 (2): 90–92. February 1920.
- "A Message to Mothers". Relief Society Magazine. 7 (3): 141–143. March 1920.
- "Paradise of Childhood". Relief Society Magazine. 7 (4): 209–211. April 1920.
- "A Child's Right to Happiness". Relief Society Magazine. 7 (5): 370–372. May 1920.
- "Blind Authority". Relief Society Magazine. 7 (7): 401–403. July 1920.

The Church of Jesus Christ of Latter-day Saints titles
Preceded by Bathsheba W. Smith	Second Counselor in the general presidency of the Relief Society; November 10, 1901–April 2, 1921	Succeeded by Julina Lambson Smith
