= Joseph Fielding Smith =

American religious leader (1876–1972)

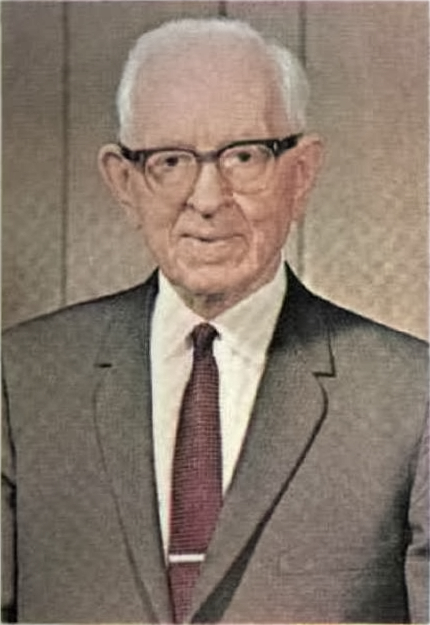

10th President of the Church of Jesus Christ of Latter-day Saints
- January 23, 1970 – July 2, 1972
- Predecessor: David O. McKay
- Successor: Harold B. Lee

Counselor in the First Presidency
- October 29, 1965 – January 18, 1970
- Called by: David O. McKay
- End reason: Dissolution of First Presidency upon the death of David O. McKay

President of the Quorum of the Twelve Apostles
- April 9, 1951 – January 23, 1970
- Predecessor: David O. McKay
- Successor: Harold B. Lee
- End reason: Became President of the Church

Acting President of the Quorum of the Twelve Apostles
- August 8, 1950 – April 4, 1951
- Reason: David O. McKay was serving as Second Counselor in the First Presidency to George Albert Smith
- End reason: Became President of the Quorum of the Twelve Apostles

Quorum of the Twelve Apostles
- April 7, 1910 – January 23, 1970
- Called by: Joseph F. Smith
- End reason: Became President of the Church

LDS Church Apostle
- April 7, 1910 – July 2, 1972
- Called by: Joseph F. Smith
- Reason: Death of John R. Winder; John Henry Smith added to First Presidency
- Reorganization at end of term: Bruce R. McConkie ordained

Personal details
- Born: Joseph Fielding Smith, Jr. July 19, 1876; Salt Lake City, Utah Territory, U.S.
- Died: July 2, 1972 (aged 95); Salt Lake City, Utah, U.S.
- Resting place: Salt Lake City Cemetery; 40°46′37.92″N 111°51′28.8″W
- Spouse(s): Louie Emily Shurtliff (m. 1898; died 1908) Ethel Georgina Reynolds (m. 1908; died 1937) Jessie Ella Evans (m. 1938; died 1971)
- Children: 11
- Parents: Joseph F. Smith; Julina Lambson Smith
- Signature
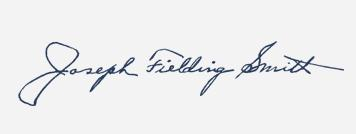

Joseph Fielding Smith Jr. (July 19, 1876 – July 2, 1972) was an American religious leader and writer who served as the tenth president of the Church of Jesus Christ of Latter-day Saints (LDS Church) from 1970 until his death in 1972. He was the son of former church president Joseph F. Smith and the great-nephew of church founder Joseph Smith.

Smith was named to the Quorum of the Twelve Apostles in 1910, when his father was the church's president. When Smith became president of the church, he was 93 years and 6 months old; he began his presidential term at an older age than any other president in church history. Smith's tenure as President of the Quorum of the Twelve Apostles from 1951 to 1970 is the third-longest in church history; he served in that capacity during the entire presidency of David O. McKay.

Smith spent some of his years as an apostle as the Church Historian and Recorder. He was a religious scholar and a prolific writer. Many of his works are used as references for church members. Doctrinally, Smith was known for rigid orthodoxy and as an arch-conservative in his views on evolution and race, although it has been said that age had softened him and as a result he put up less resistance to reforms by the time he had become president.

== Early life ==
Smith was born in Salt Lake City, Utah Territory, on July 19, 1876, as the first son of Julina Lambson Smith, the second wife and first plural wife of Joseph F. Smith, then a member of the Quorum of the Twelve. By agreement between his parents, Smith was given his father's name, even though Joseph F. Smith's third and fourth wives had previously had sons. Growing up, Smith lived in his father's large family home at 333 West 100 North in Salt Lake City. The house was opposite the original campus of the University of Deseret (modern University of Utah), on a site now occupied by Ensign College. He also often worked on the family farm in Taylorsville, Utah, as a child.

In January 1879, when Smith was two years old, the U.S. Supreme Court in Reynolds v. United States upheld the constitutionality of the Morrill Anti-Bigamy Act of 1862, which had criminalized the Mormon practice of plural marriage. Due to aggressive federal enforcement of this ruling, as well as the Edmunds Act of 1882 and the Edmunds–Tucker Act of 1887, many LDS Church leaders, including Smith's father, were either imprisoned or forced into hiding and exile during most of the 1880s. Smith's father, as the keeper of the records of the Endowment House, felt a special need to avoid capture since the records could allow the federal authorities to easily prove polygamy charges against certain Latter-day Saint men. In January 1885, Smith's parents and his younger sister, Julina, left for the Sandwich Islands (modern Hawaii), where Smith's father had served a mission as a teenager in the 1850s. In their absence, Smith continued to live in the family home with his brothers and sisters and his father's other wives, whom he "lovingly called 'aunties'". Smith's mother returned to Salt Lake City in 1887, followed later by his father. Even after his return, Joseph F. Smith was unable to openly visit and care for his wives and children until receiving a presidential pardon from U.S. President Benjamin Harrison in September 1891.

Smith's mother worked as a midwife to help provide for the family, and delivered nearly 1,000 babies in her career without ever having a mother or infant die in childbirth. As a boy, Smith often drove his mother by wagon to the various deliveries that she attended in Salt Lake City. Smith's primary schooling took place in "ward schools", which in the 19th century were semi-formal schools run by members of each ward which taught the traditional "three R's": reading, writing, and arithmetic. As a teenager Smith completed two years of study at the Latter-day Saint College, an institution equivalent to the modern U.S. high school, which provided courses in the basic areas of mathematics, geography, history, basic science, and penmanship. After leaving the college, Smith began working as a stock clerk doing manual labor at ZCMI to supplement the family's income. Smith was present in the large assembly room of the Salt Lake Temple for its dedication on April 6, 1893, by church president Wilford Woodruff.

== Family and personal life ==
Smith married his first wife, Louie Emily "Emyla" Shurtliff (born June 16, 1876) on April 26, 1898. In March 1899, church president Lorenzo Snow called him on a mission to Great Britain, which he completed (May 1899 - July 1901), leaving Louie in Salt Lake City. On May 12, 1899, Smith was set apart as a missionary and ordained a seventy by his father. A small group of missionaries, including Smith and his older brother, Joseph Richards Smith, left the next day for England. After his return from the British mission, Smith and his wife had two daughters, Josephine and Julina. Louie died of complications of a third pregnancy on March 28, 1908. For part of this time Smith was a member of the Mormon Tabernacle Choir, including time with Evan Stephens as conductor.

Smith married Ethel Georgina Reynolds (born October 23, 1889), the daughter of prominent LDS Church leader George Reynolds, on November 2, 1908. They had four girls (Emily, Naomi, Lois, and Amelia) and five boys (Joseph Fielding (often called Joseph Fielding Smith, Jr.), Lewis Warren, George Reynolds, Douglas Allan, and Milton Edmund). Their youngest daughter, Amelia, married Bruce R. McConkie, who was named to the Quorum of the Twelve Apostles shortly after Smith's death. Ethel died of a cerebral hemorrhage on August 26, 1937, at age 47.

Ethel had specifically requested that Jessie Ella Evans (December 29, 1902 – August 2, 1971) sing at her funeral. Evans, born to Jonathan Evans and Janet Buchanan Evans, had joined the Mormon Tabernacle Choir in 1918, was a member of the American Light Opera Company (1923–27), and was the Salt Lake County Recorder. In November 1937, Evans and Smith were engaged to be married.

In April 12, 1938, Smith married Evans in the Salt Lake Temple. The marriage was performed by Heber J. Grant. The couple had no children and Jessie died on August 2, 1971.

== Church service ==
Smith at the time of his call to the Quorum of the Twelve Apostles

After completing his mission in 1901, Smith began working in the office of the Church Historian and Recorder. In 1906, he was given the position of Assistant Church Historian. He wrote his first doctrinal book, The Origins of the Reorganized Church and the Question of Succession in 1909, to defend the LDS Church against the recent proselytizing by missionaries for the Reorganized Church of Jesus Christ of Latter Day Saints (RLDS Church) in Utah. He was the acting recorder of the 1910 general conference when he was called as an apostle. Prior to his call as a general authority, Smith served as the secretary and treasurer of the Genealogical Society of Utah. In 1921, Smith assumed the office of Church Historian and Recorder, which he held until 1970.

Before 1910, Smith was a member of a stake high council and a home missionary (somewhat similar to a modern ward missionary). He also served on the Young Men's Mutual Improvement Association General Board.

Early in his apostleship, his creationist views on the dispute between Mormonism's Biblical teachings and the theory of evolution brought him attention. (See Mormonism and evolution.) Smith authored the book Man, His Origin and Destiny on the subject and unsuccessfully tried to make it the basis of a course of study at the church seminaries. The book was met with disapproval from church president David O. McKay, who made it clear that the book was unauthorized by the church and was not to be taken as reflecting church doctrine. However, because Smith was the Acting President of the Quorum of the Twelve Apostles at the time of publication and later became president of the church, his views carried substantial weight with the general church membership and grew to be accepted by a significant portion.

Smith lived most of his time as an apostle in Salt Lake City. He also was president of the Salt Lake Temple from 1945 to 1949. During this time, Smith was sent on a tour of the church's Spanish-American Mission. Before his return to Salt Lake City, he informed the president of the Arizona Temple that he would recommend to the First Presidency that the temple ceremonies be translated into Spanish.

Smith served as president of the Genealogical Society of Utah and its successor the Genealogical Society of the LDS Church from 1934 to 1961. At the time of his release from this position, he had been President of the Quorum of the Twelve for over a decade. During the late 1950s, Smith attempted to reduce staff turnover at the Society by trying to convince the First Presidency that women should be permitted to stay on as employees after they married. However, Smith was only able to get a change to allow them to work six months past marriage.

In early 1961, Smith preached to a stake conference congregation in Hawaii:

We will never get a man into space. This earth is man's sphere and it was never intended that he should get away from it. The moon is a superior planet to the earth and it was never intended that man should go there. You can write it down in your books that this will never happen.

Earlier, Smith had written that "it is doubtful that man will ever be permitted to make any instrument or ship to travel through space and visit the moon or any distant planet". At the 1970 press conference where Smith was introduced as President of the LDS Church, he was asked about these statements; Smith reportedly responded, "Well, I was wrong, wasn't I?"

Smith's teachings as an apostle were the 2014 course of study in the LDS Church's Sunday Relief Society and Melchizedek priesthood classes.

=== Service abroad ===
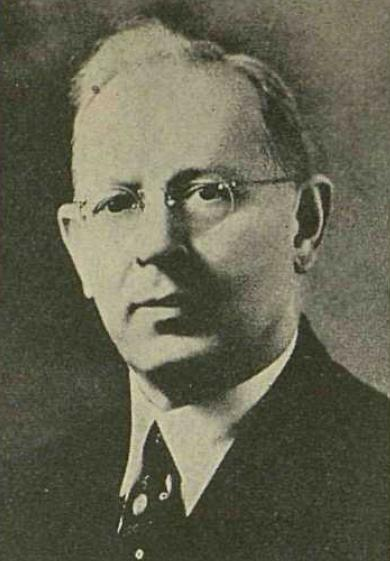
Smith while a member of the Quorum of the Twelve (Ca. 1942)

Smith did at times take church assignments abroad. In 1939, he toured the missions in Europe and supervised the withdrawal of missionaries as World War II began. In 1950 Smith toured the church's Mexican Mission. In July and August 1955 he made an extensive tour of Asia, during which he dedicated Korea and the Philippines for the preaching of the gospel. In 1957 he went to Europe for the dedication of the London Temple and also presided over the excommunication of several missionaries in the French mission who had apostatized. From October 1960 to January 1961 he and Jessie toured the church missions in Central and South America.

== Writings ==
The first book Smith published was Asael Smith of Topsfield, Massachusetts, with some Account of the Smith Family (1902). In all, Smith published 25 books.

== Church president ==
Smith became the LDS Church's president on January 23, 1970, following the death of David O. McKay. He chose Harold B. Lee and N. Eldon Tanner as his counselors. Smith elected not to retain Hugh B. Brown in the First Presidency. According to Church Historian Leonard J. Arrington, Smith's age and health prevented him from having much of a supervising role during his presidency; most work was done by his two counselors.

Although he served as church president for less than three years, Smith's administration introduced several new initiatives: Area conferences were introduced, significant organizational restructuring in the church's Sunday School system and the church's Department of Social Services occurred, and the church magazines were consolidated into the Ensign, New Era and Friend in English, with centralized planning for all publications. His tenure was also marked by steady growth in the number of missionaries, and the dedication of temples in Ogden and Provo, Utah.

== Death ==
Smith died at his home in Salt Lake City on July 2, 1972, at age 95. He attended church services with his ward that day, and while visiting with one of his daughters that evening he quietly died while sitting in his favorite chair. He was buried in the Salt Lake City Cemetery on July 6, 1972.

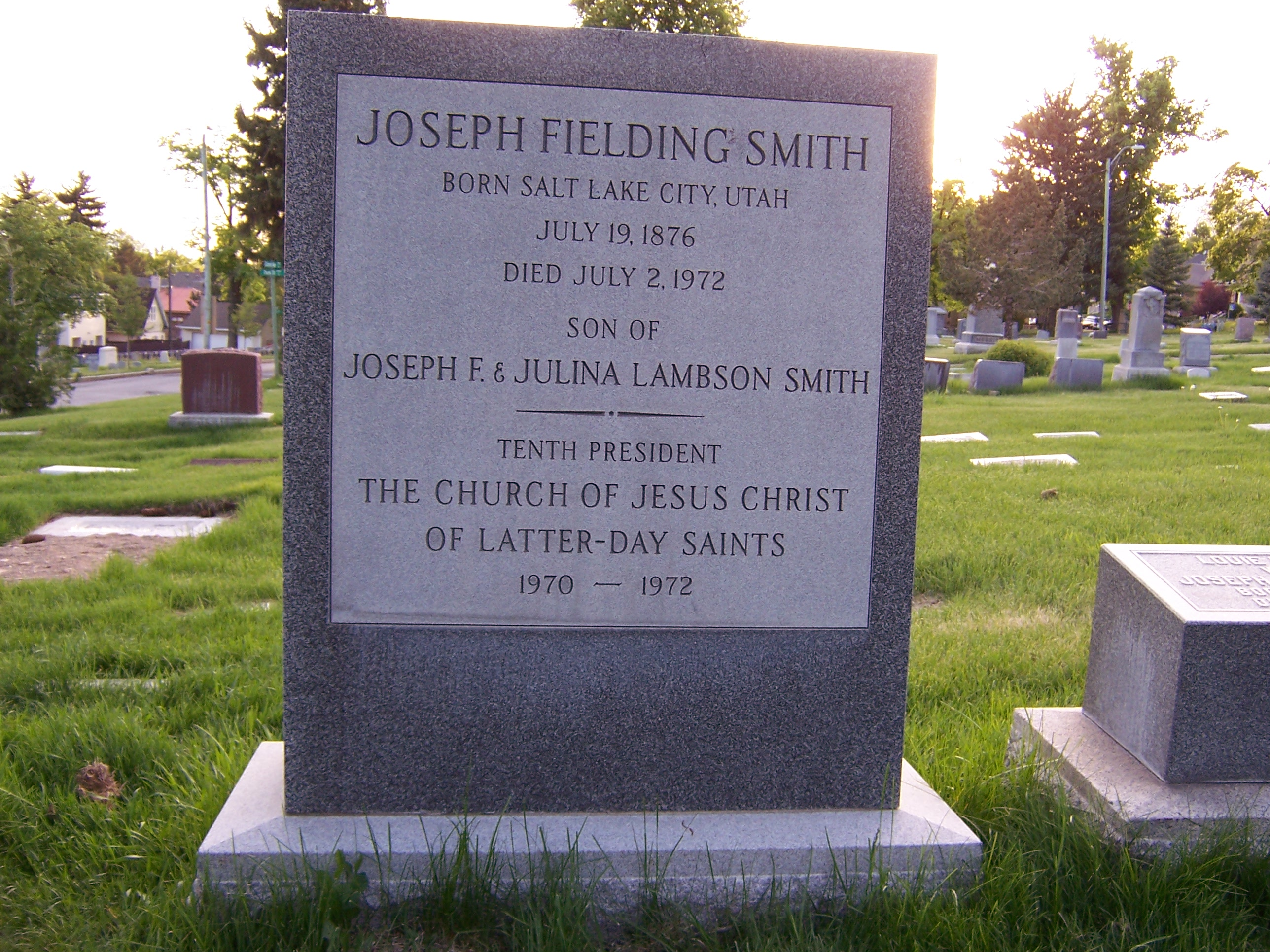
Grave marker of Joseph Fielding Smith.

== Ancestry ==
8. Joseph Smith Sr.
4. Hyrum Smith
9. Lucy Mack
2. Joseph F. Smith
10. John Fielding
5. Mary Fielding
11. Rachel Ibbotson
1. Joseph Fielding Smith Jr.
12. Boaz Lambson
6. Alfred Boaz Lambson
13. Polly Walworth
3. Julina Lambson
14. Mark Bigler
7. Melissa Jane Bigler
15. Susannah Ogden

== Works ==
Books

- Smith, Joseph Fielding (1909). Origin of the "Reorganized" Church. Deseret News. p. 1.
- —— (1922). Essentials in Church History: A History of the Church From the Birth of Joseph Smith Until the Present Time. Deseret News.
- —— (1931). The Way to Perfection: Short Discourses on Gospel Themes. Salt Lake City: Genealogical Society of Utah. OCLC 13970625.
- —— (1936). The Progress of Man. Genealogical Society of Utah.
- —— (1938). Teachings of the Prophet Joseph Smith. Deseret Book Company. OCLC 718055.
- —— (1942). The Signs of the Times: A Series of Discussions Sponsored by the Sisters of the Lion House Social Center. Deseret News.
- —— (1945). The Restoration of All Things: A Series of Radio Talks...On Fundamental Principles of the Gospel. Deseret News Press.
- —— (1946). Church History and Modern Revelation: Being a course of study for the Melchizedek Priesthood Quorums for the Year 1947. The Council of the Twelve Apostles.
- —— (1954). Man, His Origin and Destiny. Deseret Book.
- —— (1954–1956). Doctrines of Salvation: Sermons and Writings of Joseph Fielding Smith. compiled by Bruce R. McConkie. Bookcraft.
- —— (1957–1966). Answers to Gospel Questions, 5 vols. Deseret Book.
- —— (1966). Take Heed to Yourselves. Salt Lake City: Deseret Book. OCLC 9858237.
- —— (1970). Seek Ye Earnestly. Deseret Book.
- —— (1971). J M. Heslop and Dell R. Van Orden (ed.). Joseph Fielding Smith: A Prophet Among the People. Deseret Book.

Other

Smith wrote the text of the hymn "Does the Journey Seem Long?", which appears as hymn number 127 in the current English-language edition of the LDS Church hymnal.

== See also ==
- Mormon views on evolution

== Notes ==
The Church of Jesus Christ of Latter-day Saints titles
Preceded by David O. McKay	President of the Church; January 23, 1970 – July 2, 1972	Succeeded by Harold B. Lee
Preceded by David O. McKay	President of the Quorum of the Twelve Apostles; April 9, 1951 – January 23, 1970	Succeeded by Harold B. Lee
Preceded by Anthony W. Ivins	Quorum of the Twelve Apostles; April 7, 1910 – January 23, 1970	Succeeded by James E. Talmage
