= Abraham O. Smoot =

American pioneer and politician

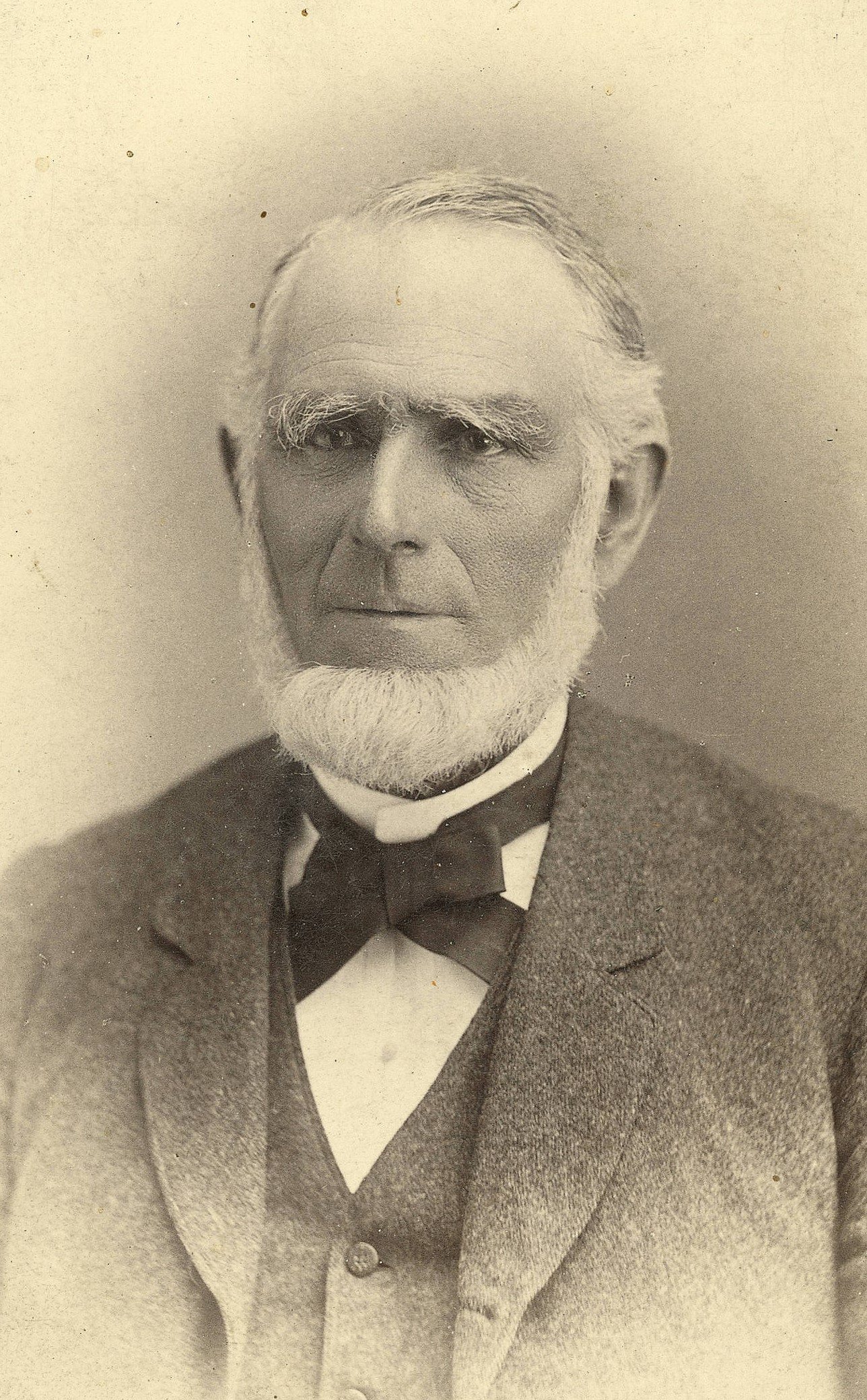
- Photo of A. O. Smoot by C. R. Savage
- Born: Abraham Owen Smoot; February 17, 1815; Owenton, Kentucky, U.S.
- Died: March 6, 1895 (aged 80); Provo, Utah Territory
- Monuments: Smoot Administration Building, Brigham Young University
- Title: Mayor of Salt Lake City, Utah; Mayor of Provo, Utah
- Term: 1857–1866; 1868–1881
- Predecessor: Jedediah M. Grant
- Successor: Daniel H. Wells
- Spouses: Margaret Thompson McMeans; Sarah Gibbens; Emily Hill; Diana Caroline Tanner Eldredge; Anne Kirstine Mauritsen; Hannah Caroline Rogers
- Children: 24 (biological); 11 (adopted)

Signature
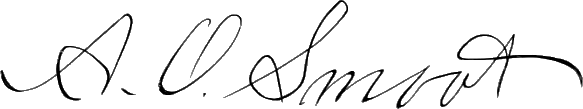

Abraham Owen Smoot (February 17, 1815 – March 6, 1895) was an American pioneer, businessman, religious leader, and politician. He spent his early life in the Southern United States and was one of seven children. After being baptized a member of the Church of Christ, predecessor to the Church of Jesus Christ of Latter-day Saints (LDS Church), Smoot served as a missionary in Kentucky, Tennessee, South Carolina, and England. He received no formal education, but learned to read as a child and later attended the School of the Prophets in Kirtland, Ohio. Like other early members of the LDS Church, Smoot practiced plural marriage, eventually marrying six women and having 24 children. After migrating west to Utah Territory, he was elected as the second mayor of Salt Lake City and maintained this position from 1857 to 1866.

Smoot was then assigned by Brigham Young to move to Provo, where he served as stake president and mayor from 1868 to 1881. He assisted financially in the construction of the Provo Tabernacle—today the Provo City Center Temple—as well as the Utah Southern Railroad. Smoot was the first president of the board of trustees of Brigham Young Academy (BYA)—which later developed into Brigham Young University (BYU). He was an early financial supporter of the institution and was nicknamed the "foster father" of the academy. His goal was to make education available to young Latter-day Saints. The Smoot Administration Building at BYU was named after him until it was demolished in 2025.

== Early life ==
Abraham Owen Smoot was born on February 17, 1815, in Owenton, Kentucky, to George W. Smoot and Nancy Ann (née Rowlett) Smoot. He was of Scottish, Irish, and English descent. He had two brothers and five sisters. His mother's uncle, Colonel Abraham Owen, served William Henry Harrison at the Battle of Tippecanoe. He was also related to General Stonewall Jackson. His family moved twice in his childhood, first to southwestern Kentucky and then to the banks of the Blood River in Tennessee. As a young boy, he worked as a farmer and was not educated. He also had a health issue as a child, which he called "a lung disease." His father died in 1828 when Smoot was nine years old, and his mother later remarried. His childhood years were mostly spent among his mother's family, the Rowletts. They had a lasting effect on young Smoot, particularly in teaching him to read. There were few schools in Henry County, Tennessee, so the Rowletts' instruction was valuable.

Nancy Rowlett Smoot joined the Church of Christ in 1835, and her son followed suit on March 22 of that same year. Warren Parrish baptized him, and David W. Patten performed his confirmation. As a child, Smoot had wondered "if the Lord had a church upon the earth". When he heard Parrish and Patten preach, he felt that his question had been answered. Patten, while confirming Smoot, promised that the young man would be able to overcome his health issue. Smoot recorded that he "began to grow strong immediately." Soon after his baptism, Smoot was given the responsibility of leading a small group of church members in Benton County, Tennessee. He befriended Wilford Woodruff, who began preparing him for missionary work. The two became companions on a short mission to Tennessee and Kentucky, then traveled to Kirtland, Ohio, together to attend the School of the Prophets. After arriving in November 1836, the two began learning Latin and Greek. This experience instilled the knowledge of the value of education in Smoot. While in Kirtland, Smoot met Joseph Smith and was able to see the sheets of papyrus that were said to contain the Book of Abraham. He also recorded suffering from typhoid fever and pleurisy while living in Ohio. After a blessing from Brigham Young, Heber C. Kimball, Willard Richards, and Hyrum Smith, he recovered. He received his patriarchal blessing from Joseph Smith Sr. and planned to return home to Tennessee for his health. After his miraculous recovery, Joseph Smith asked Smoot to work in the southern states as a missionary.

== Missions ==
On February 4, 1836, Smoot was ordained an elder and began preaching in Kentucky and Tennessee with Woodruff, Patten, and others. This first mission lasted nine months. Smoot met both hostile mobs and people who readily accepted baptism. While preaching, he continued to preside over the branch of the church in his hometown. That fall, Smoot's group of missionaries headed north to Kirtland to join the main body of church members assembled there.

Smoot received an assignment from Joseph Smith to gather a group of people from his home state of Tennessee to move to Far West, Missouri. He recruited his family and others, successfully creating a party of about 200 people. After helping his family settle in nearby Daviess County, Missouri, Smoot assisted in surveying the nearby valley of Adam-ondi-Ahman. In 1838, he embarked on a five-month proselytizing mission to southern Missouri and Arkansas. Once he returned to Far West, Missouri state forces invaded; and Smoot, alongside Joseph and Hyrum Smith, was taken prisoner on November 1 during the 1838 Mormon War. He then moved to the new settlement of Zarahemla, Iowa, and was chosen as a member of the high council. In April 1842, Smoot began another mission, this time to South Carolina. He preached in Charleston, but found no success and returned to Nauvoo, Illinois, that July. During Joseph Smith's 1844 presidential campaign, Smoot was assigned to travel to Tennessee and oversee both political and missionary efforts in the area. While preaching and electioneering in Dresden, Tennessee, Smoot came in contact with those who opposed his beliefs. One night, a man attempted to assassinate Smoot, but narrowly missed; the "bullet passed near [his] head and lodged in the ceiling". On another occasion, when "a mob of two hundred men" threatened Smoot while he was speaking, a few audience members protected him after he made the Masonic sign that signaled danger. Smoot later wrote: "During my experience I have seen the power of God manifested upon various occasions in preserving my life". When he learned of the deaths of Joseph and Hyrum, Smoot returned to Nauvoo. His next assignment was to lead a branch of the church in Keokuk, Iowa. In 1844, he served another mission in Alabama as part of his charge from Brigham Young to direct the church in the South. He gathered a group from this region to move to Nauvoo and eventually journey west. In between his missions, Smoot volunteered as a police officer in Nauvoo and an officiator in the Nauvoo Temple.

In 1851, Smoot undertook another mission, this time to England. His goal this time was to bring converts to the church back to the United States, sponsored by the Perpetual Emigration Fund. Smoot left England within the same month of his arrival and, once back in the U.S., accompanied the band of British immigrants on the trek west. He contracted cholera while traveling, but recovered. The group arrived in Utah in September 1852. In total, Smoot served nine proselyting missions for the LDS Church, in addition to twice serving as a bishop.

In 1880, when he was 65 years old, Smoot was assigned by John Taylor to travel with his son, Reed Smoot, to the Hawaiian Islands. This was partly a mission for the church and partly a trip designed to improve Smoot's health. While in Hawaii, he met with King Kalakaua and taught him about the faith. Reed, in letters to his mother, wrote that his father exercised and toured the islands every day, despite being there for purpose of gaining some rest.

== Marriages and family ==
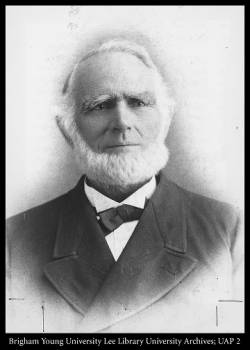
Abraham O. Smoot, c. 1880

In early 1838, while serving as a missionary in Missouri and Arkansas, Smoot began writing letters to a widow named Margaret Thompson McMeans Adkinson. She was six years older than Smoot. He married her on November 11, 1838 in Far West, Missouri while a prisoner of war. Once construction of the Nauvoo Temple was completed, the couple was sealed and "receive[d] their blessings". Adkinson had one son from her first marriage named William, whom Smoot adopted. Smoot described his new wife as "zealous and devoted to her religion and ready to sacrifice or endure anything to further its interests." The two were forced out of Missouri and fled to Iowa. Smoot was the only man in the company and the driver of the wagon. Adkinson then accompanied Smoot on the way to his mission in South Carolina; the couple stopped in Tennessee and, after visiting with her family, Adkinson returned north to Nauvoo. She later traveled with him to Alabama for his mission there.

On January 9, 1846, Smoot began practicing plural marriage. He was sealed to his second wife, Sarah Gibbens, then to his third, Emily Hill, with the approval of Adkinson. She gave her "fullest and freest consent" for Smoot to enter into polygamy; she saw it as "a pure, chaste principle revealed to the Saints through the Prophet Joseph Smith." Hill was a widow with two children from her previous marriage, William and Artimisia. Smoot was 31 years old, Gibbens was 45, and Hill was 39. On November 23, 1847, once the family had crossed the plains and settled in the Salt Lake Valley, Hill gave birth to Smoot's first biological child, Albert. She eventually had three more children: Margaret, Emily, and Zina Beal. In 1850, the family relocated to Big Cottonwood Canyon. Gibbens did not emigrate to Utah and requested a divorce from Smoot in 1852.

In 1855, Smoot married Diana Tanner Eldredge. The following year, he married Anne Kirstine Mauritsen, an immigrant from Brekka, Norway. Eldredge gave birth to thirteen children and Mauritsen to seven. He later married Hannah Caroline Rogers in 1886 in Logan, Utah. He reportedly went to prison for a time because of his plural marriages. In addition to having six wives, Smoot was sealed to some of the deceased ancestors of his wife, including Margaret Adkinson, who had died unmarried.

Smoot had twenty-four biological children by three of his wives: Hill, Eldredge, and Mauritsen. These include Reed Smoot, politician and US Senator; Brigham Smoot, missionary in Samoa; and Ida Smoot Dusenberry, member of the Relief Society General Board. Another of his daughters, Zina Beal Smoot, was married to apostle Orson F. Whitney. He also adopted eleven children over the course of his life, many of whom were the children of his wives by their previous husbands. One of these, William Cockhorn Adkinson, became—at a young age—a member of the Quorum of the Seventy formed in Nauvoo. Adkinson, as well as "several of [Caroline Rogers'] children by Aaron Daniels" were sealed to Smoot in the temple. As a father, Smoot was strict in teaching his children Christian values; he wanted them to grow up to be stout believers. Their memories of him denote a stern but loving father. As was common at the time, the extended Smoot family lost multiple members to disease. When, his young grandchildren died, Smoot comforted the parents—his children—through letters and visits. He provided his advice whenever it was asked for.

== Migration west ==
Sickness prevented Smoot from leaving Nauvoo, Illinois with the first group of Mormon pioneers. He and "a large company of his southern friends" began the trek west in May 1846. Two of his wives, Adkinson and Hill, traveled with him, but Sarah Gibbens did not. By July, the group arrived in Council Bluffs, Iowa, where Smoot was called as a bishop. He was ordained to that office in January 1847 when the company reached Winter Quarters, Nebraska, and joined the other pioneers. There, Smoot was named the leader of the fourth hundred, a group of a hundred families and 120 wagons. He offered "both temporal and spiritual guidance" to his group of 317 people as they made the journey west together. Smoot's company arrived in Utah in September 1847. They were the second group of pioneers to arrive in the Salt Lake Valley.

== Involvement with abolitionism and slavery ==
Smoot's southern ancestors were slaveholders, and while proselyting with Wilford Woodruff in July 1836, Smoot read the April issue of the Messenger and Advocate to refute accusations of their being abolitionists. However, as a Latter-day Saint missionary in 1844, he actively supported Joseph Smith's presidential platform, which called for the gradual elimination of slavery. On a mission to Tennessee, Smoot tried to have 3,000 copies of Smith's presidential platform printed, but the printer refused, since it was illegal to distribute abolitionist literature in the state.

Later, in Utah Territory, Abraham and Margaret Smoot became slaveholders, owning at least two men and one girl—Tom, Jerry, and Lucy. Tom died in 1862, still a slave. Modern historians have called Smoot, along with Brigham Young, Charles C. Rich, and William H. Hooper, a "respectable minority" of Utah Territory citizens "in favor of slavery."

Smoot was later involved in the 1879 discussions among church leaders about the origins of the priesthood and temple restrictions for black Latter-day Saints. He hosted a gathering at his home in Provo, Utah, with John Taylor, Brigham Young Jr., Zebedee Coltrin, and L. John Nuttall. Smoot remembered that when Patten, Parrish, and Thomas B. Marsh were missionaries in the South in 1835 and 1836, they took the question of ordaining black men to Joseph Smith. Southern slave codes limited the ability of enslaved people to assemble or preach. Smoot recalled, "his decision as I understood, was that they were not entitled to the Priesthood, nor yet to be baptized without the consent of their Masters. In [later] years ... I became acquainted with Joseph myself in Far West about the year 1838. I received from Joseph substantially the same instructions. It was on my application to him what should be done with the Negro in the South as I was preaching to them. He said I could baptize them by the consent of their Masters, but not to confer the Priesthood upon them." Pertaining to this statement, professor Gordon C. Thomasson has remarked: "It is extremely difficult to imagine [Smoot] inventing his oft-cited testimony, nor is it likely that the statements can be attributed totally to prejudice acquired or reinforced while serving as [a missionary]."

== Leadership in Utah ==
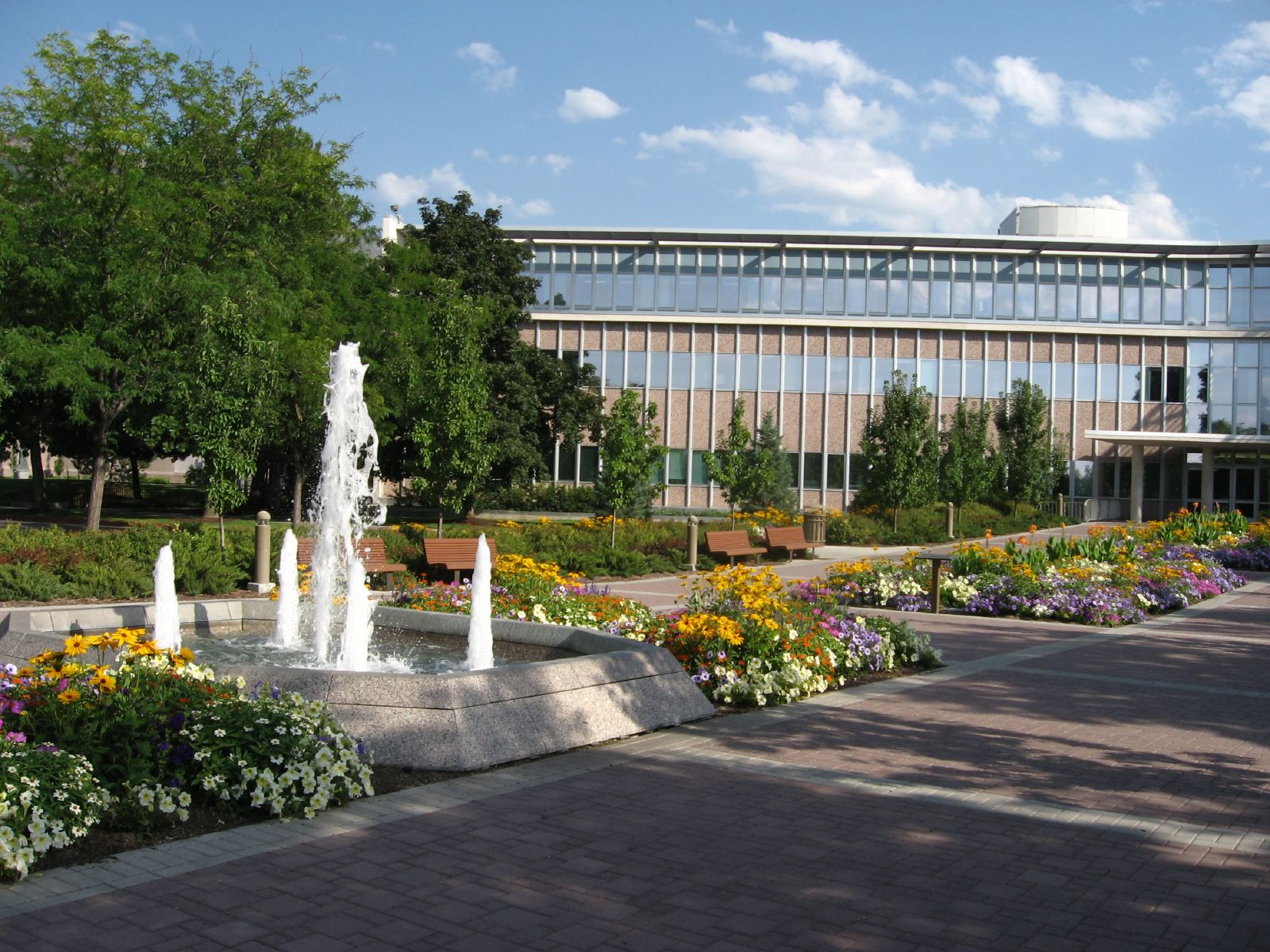
Smoot Administration Building at BYU

=== Salt Lake City ===
Smoot led companies of pioneers to the Salt Lake Valley in 1847, 1852, and 1856. In Salt Lake valley, he served as bishop of the LDS Church's Fifteenth Ward. He was also Utah Territory's first elected justice of the peace. Alongside Shadrach Roundy, Jedediah M. Grant, and John S. Fullmer, Smoot started the Great Salt Lake Valley Carrying Company, a business venture that involved the transportation of goods and people across the Great Plains during the California Gold Rush. Smoot himself led thirteen such trips. He was also an alderman from the Sugar House district from 1854 to 1857. He was elected as the second mayor of Salt Lake City in 1857, after the death of his business partner and the city's first mayor, Grant. Smoot was re-elected and served as mayor until 1866. During this time, he was also a bishop in Salt Lake City. In addition to serving as mayor, he attended some of Utah's constitutional conventions.

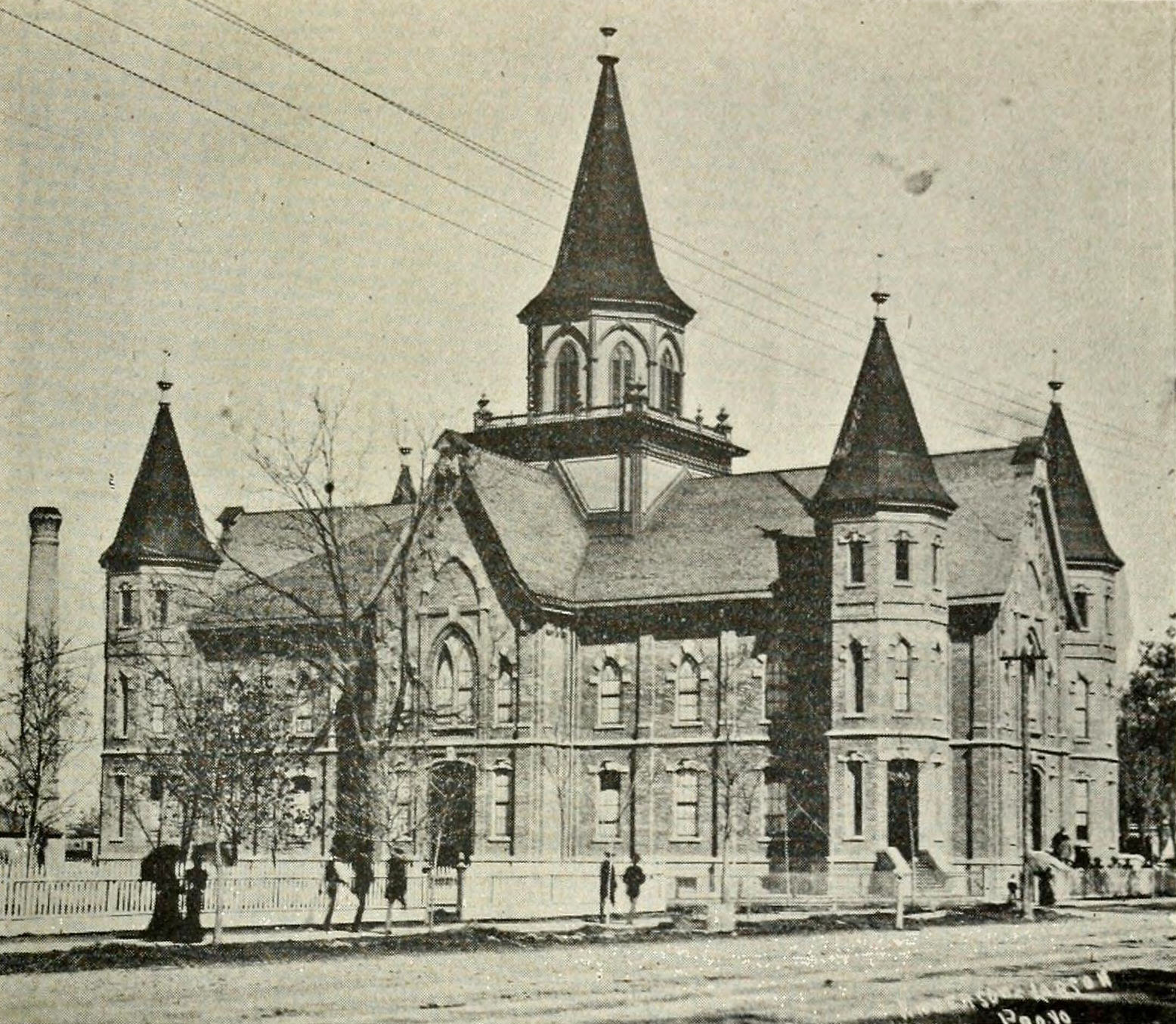
Provo Tabernacle, 1914, which Smoot helped fund and construct

=== Provo and Brigham Young Academy ===
Early in 1868, Young called Smoot to be president of the church's Utah Stake in Provo. Young was concerned with the unity and cooperation of church members and he expected Smoot to improve the situation. According to family tradition, Smoot initially protested the call. After more than three decades of church and civic service, including nine missions, Smoot was apparently looking forward to enjoying the comforts brought by his hard work and successful business ventures. When Young told Smoot about the assignment, he reportedly said, "There are three places, all on a par, one is as good as the other. They are Provo, Hell, or Texas. You can take your choice." Although Smoot supposedly responded, "I would sooner go to Hell than to Provo," he eventually chose Provo. Smoot thought that church service should come before personal interests; while writing about this experience of moving to Provo, Smoot concluded: "We should be willing to be dictated by the priesthood in all our ways."

By February 1868, Smoot had settled in Provo with his family. Young had named him the Presiding Bishop of Provo; some members there had departed from the teachings of the church and needed a leader to unify them. Within his first week in the city, Smoot was elected mayor, an office he held until 1881. His motto as the political and religious leader of Provo was: "Ye Elders of Israel, know that ye are right and then go straight ahead." He reportedly received no compensation for his public service in both Provo and Salt Lake City. Under his leadership, the Utah Southern Railroad, multiple streets, and the Provo Tabernacle were built. Smoot contributed personally to the fund for the Tabernacle and worked to raise money from the community as well. He was a major investor in the Provo Woolen Mills and eventually became president of the business. Smoot was also co-founder and president of the First National Bank of Provo and the Provo Lumber Manufacturing and Building Company.

Smoot was the first president of the board of trustees of BYA from 1875 until his death in 1895. Board members such as Harvey H. Cluff and Martha Jane Knowlton Coray served under the direction of Smoot for twenty years. Smoot is credited with making major financial contributions to BYA that allowed for its continued operations. Enrollment increased from 70 students to 313 during Smoot's tenure. BYA eventually developed into BYU. Today, BYU's administration building is named after Smoot. Despite personal financial success, Smoot was heavily weighed down by the burden of debts from the construction of the Provo Tabernacle and Academy Building, for which he was personally liable, until his passing. He mortgaged his property in order to sustain BYA. In January 1884, a fire destroyed the Lewis Building, BYA's place of operation. Smoot quickly convened a meeting and was able to arrange school to be held that evening; thus, "only one day was lost". He appealed for financial support from the church multiple times, but this request was not granted during his lifetime. After Young's death, Smoot was colloquially called BYA's "foster father". In both Salt Lake and Provo, Smoot continued his studies at the School of the Prophets, which he first began in Kirtland, Ohio as a young man. He "had limited formal book learning but he was anxious that his children and the children in the church be given educational opportunities."

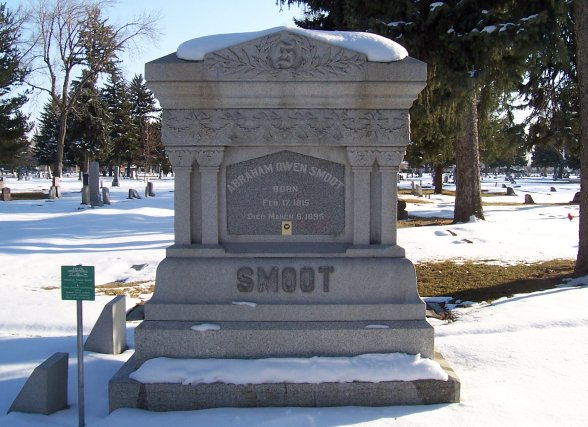
Grave marker of A. O. Smoot in the Provo City Cemetery

== Death and legacy ==
Smoot died on March 6, 1895, in Provo, Utah. He had celebrated his 80th birthday with a large gathering of family members just 17 days prior. His health had declined after an incident in 1893 when he was hit by a falling tree. Smoot's funeral was held on March 10, 1895, in the Provo Tabernacle and was called "the most impressive ever witnessed in pioneer Utah territory." The LDS Church's First Presidency—which included Lorenzo Snow and John Henry Smith—were in attendance. Speakers included George Q. Cannon, Joseph E. Taylor, Joseph F. Smith, Woodruff, and Karl G. Maeser. According to The Latter Day Saints' Millennial Star, "the attendance at the funeral was the largest seen in Provo." In addition, Woodruff recorded that Smoot's funeral procession was "the longest [he had] ever seen in Utah." Smoot was survived by two of his wives and nineteen of his children.

In 1962, BYU's administration building was named after Smoot. In 2015, he was remembered and celebrated at BYU's homecoming events. In 1994, it was recorded that Smoot had "more than 3,000 descendants." He has been called "one of the most prominent and influential men in the history of the State [of Utah]." A collection of 257 manuscripts documenting Smoot's life, including his journals, letters, patriarchal blessing, and mission call, is included in the L. Tom Perry Special Collections Library at BYU's Harold B. Lee Library.

Political offices
Preceded by Jedediah M. Grant	Mayors of Salt Lake City; 1857–1866	Succeeded by Daniel H. Wells
