= Bathsheba W. Smith =

American Mormon leader (1822–1910)

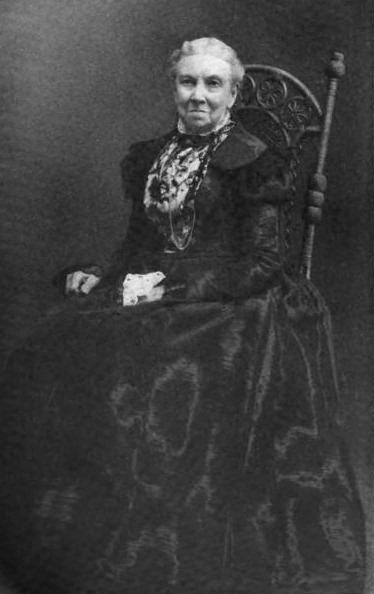

4th Relief Society General President
- November 10, 1901 – September 20, 1910
- Called by: Lorenzo Snow
- Predecessor: Zina D. H. Young
- Successor: Emmeline B. Wells

Second Counselor in the Relief Society General Presidency
- October 11, 1888 – November 10, 1901
- Called by: Zina D. H. Young
- Predecessor: Elizabeth Ann Whitney
- Successor: Ida S. Dusenberry

Personal details
- Born: Bathsheba Wilson Bigler; May 3, 1822; Shinnston, Virginia, (Note: Shinnston was part of Virginia until June 20, 1863. See Virginia in the American Civil War:West Virginia splits.) United States
- Died: September 20, 1910 (aged 88); Salt Lake City, Utah, United States
- Resting place: Salt Lake City Cemetery; 40.7772°N 111.8580°W
- Spouse(s): George A. Smith
- Children: George Albert Smith Jr. Bathsheba Smith; John Smith
- Parents: Mark Bigler; Susannah Ogden
- Website: Bathsheba W. Smith
- Signature

Bathsheba Wilson Bigler Smith (May 3, 1822 – September 20, 1910) was an early member of the Latter Day Saint movement. She was the fourth general president of the Relief Society of the Church of Jesus Christ of Latter-day Saints (LDS Church), matron of the Salt Lake Temple, member of the Board of Directors of Deseret Hospital, all based in Salt Lake City, Utah and a leader in the western United States woman's suffrage movement.

== Early life and Missouri ==
Born near Shinnston, Harrison County, Virginia (later West Virginia), she was the daughter of Mark Bigler and Susanna Ogden. When she was young, Bathsheba traded names with a friend as a symbol of their friendship, which is where the "Wilson" part of Bathsheba's name comes from.

When Bathsheba was 15, she heard about the Mormon gospel from members of the Latter Day Saint movement. She believed in the church's message, and she was baptized on August 21, 1837, alongside her family. Soon after the family's conversion, they desired to move to Missouri along with other members of the church.

These excerpts from her autobiography tell how her family moved from Virginia, first to Missouri, and then to Illinois:

My brother, Jacob G. Bigler, having gone to Far West, Missouri, joined the church there and bought a farm for my father, and then returned.

About this time my father sold his farm in West Virginia, and fitted out my mother, my brother and sister Sarah, Melissa and myself, and we started for Far West, Missouri, in company with my two brothers-in-law and my uncle and their families.

Father stayed to settle up his business intending to join us at Far West in the spring, bringing with him, by water, farming implements [and] house furniture.

Three nights after we had arrived at the farm which my brother had bought, and which was four miles south of the city of Far West, word came that a mob were gathering on Crooked River, and a call was made for men to go out...for the purpose of trying to stop...the mob, who were...destroying and burning property. Cap. David Patten's company went, and a battle ensued.

My father had to lose what he had paid on his farm. And in February 1838, in the depth of winter, our family and thousands of the Saints were on the way to the State of Illinois. In the spring, father joined us at Quincy, Illinois.

— Bathsheba W. Smith, Autobiography of Bathsheba W. Smith

On September 23, 1839, her father, Mark Bigler, died in Quincy.

In the spring of 1840, our family moved to Nauvoo, in Illinois.

— Bathsheba W. Smith, Autobiography of Bathsheba W. Smith

== Nauvoo, Illinois ==
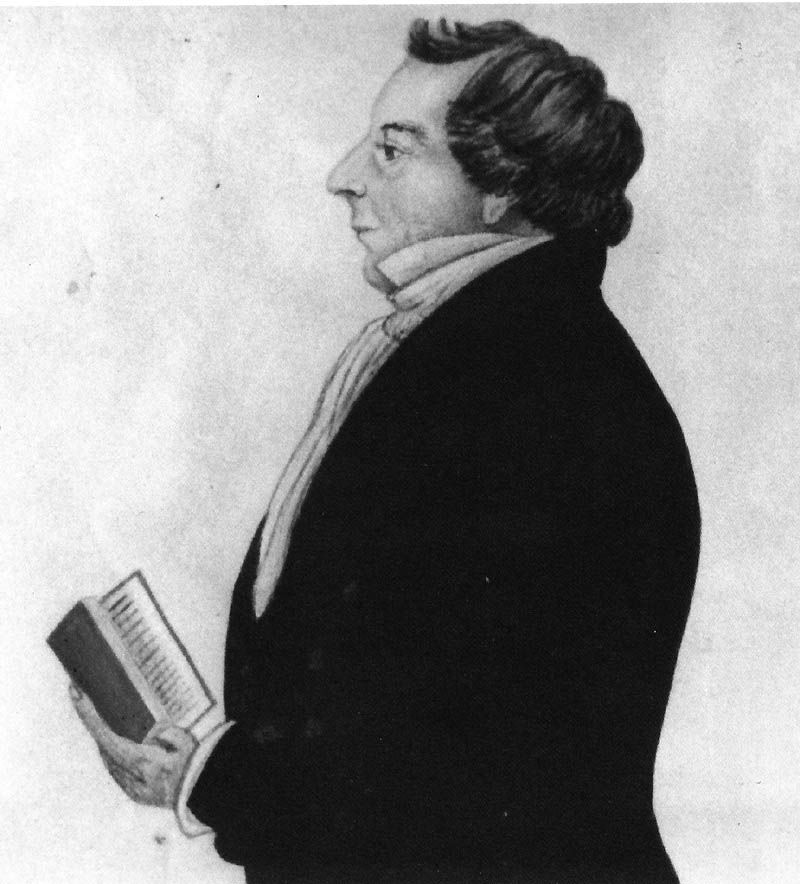
Profile of Joseph Smith Jr. (circa 1843), drawing by Bathsheba W. Smith

In Nauvoo, Illinois on July 25, 1841, Bathsheba Bigler married George A. Smith who was the youngest member of the Quorum of the Twelve Apostles of the Church of Christ at that time. Bathsheba gave birth to their first child, George Albert Jr., on July 7, 1842. Several months after the birth, George A. left to the Eastern States to serve a mission. Upon his return to Nauvoo in 1843, George and Bathsheba received the ordinances of endowments and sealing. In 1844, Smith's husband left once again on a mission. He returned in August in time for the birth of the couple's daughter, Bathsheba, on August 14, 1844.

Smith kept a diary and sketchbook for most of her life which included drawings of prominent members of the Latter Day Saint community. These included portraits of church president Joseph Smith and his brother Hyrum.

Bathsheba and Eliza R. Snow designed the original temple garment, at Joseph Smith's request.

== Salt Lake City, Utah ==
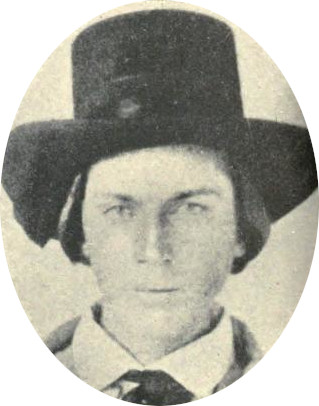
Oldest son George A. Smith, Jr., was killed en route to a church mission assignment

During the succession crisis that occurred after the assassination of Smith, Bathsheba Smith, her husband and two children joined the Latter Day Saint group following Brigham Young. They traveled west and established themselves first in Salt Lake City. While other members of the family later moved to southern Utah, Smith spent the rest of her life in Salt Lake City. Bathsheba and George A. Smith were the parents of three children. Their son, George A. Smith Jr., was killed by Navajo while on his way to serve a mission with Jacob Hamblin to the Hopi. Their daughter, Bathsheba, married Clarence Merrill, among whose children was Alice Merrill Horne. Their third child, John, died the day of his birth, April 14, 1847, in Winter Quarters, Nebraska. Smith also largely raised her sister's daughter, Julina Lambson, who later became a wife of Joseph F. Smith.

During the early 1870s, George A. Smith served as first counselor in the First Presidency under Young. He and his wife traveled to many emerging Mormon settlements, preaching and promoting church affairs.

After the death of her husband in 1875, Smith became active in civic affairs and locally involved in the women's suffrage movement, primarily through articles she wrote for the Woman's Exponent. For many years, starting at Nauvoo, Smith was also heavily involved in temple work, and was the matron of the Salt Lake temple.

== General Relief Society leadership ==
In 1888, Smith became the second counselor in the Relief Society general presidency. In this position, she heavily encouraged home production of clothing. She was called to serve as general president of the Relief Society in 1901 and served in the position until her death in 1910. During her administration, the original Relief Society Building was completed (in 1909) and helped introduce classes on childrearing, industry, and marriage. In addition, the General Relief Society established an employment bureau for young women, educational nursing and mother's courses, and food storage plans under Smith's leadership. Smith was also on the board of directors at the Deseret Hospital and served in the Retrenchment Association presidency.

She was among those called to testify before the Smoot hearings, but due to ill health, was only able to file an affidavit.

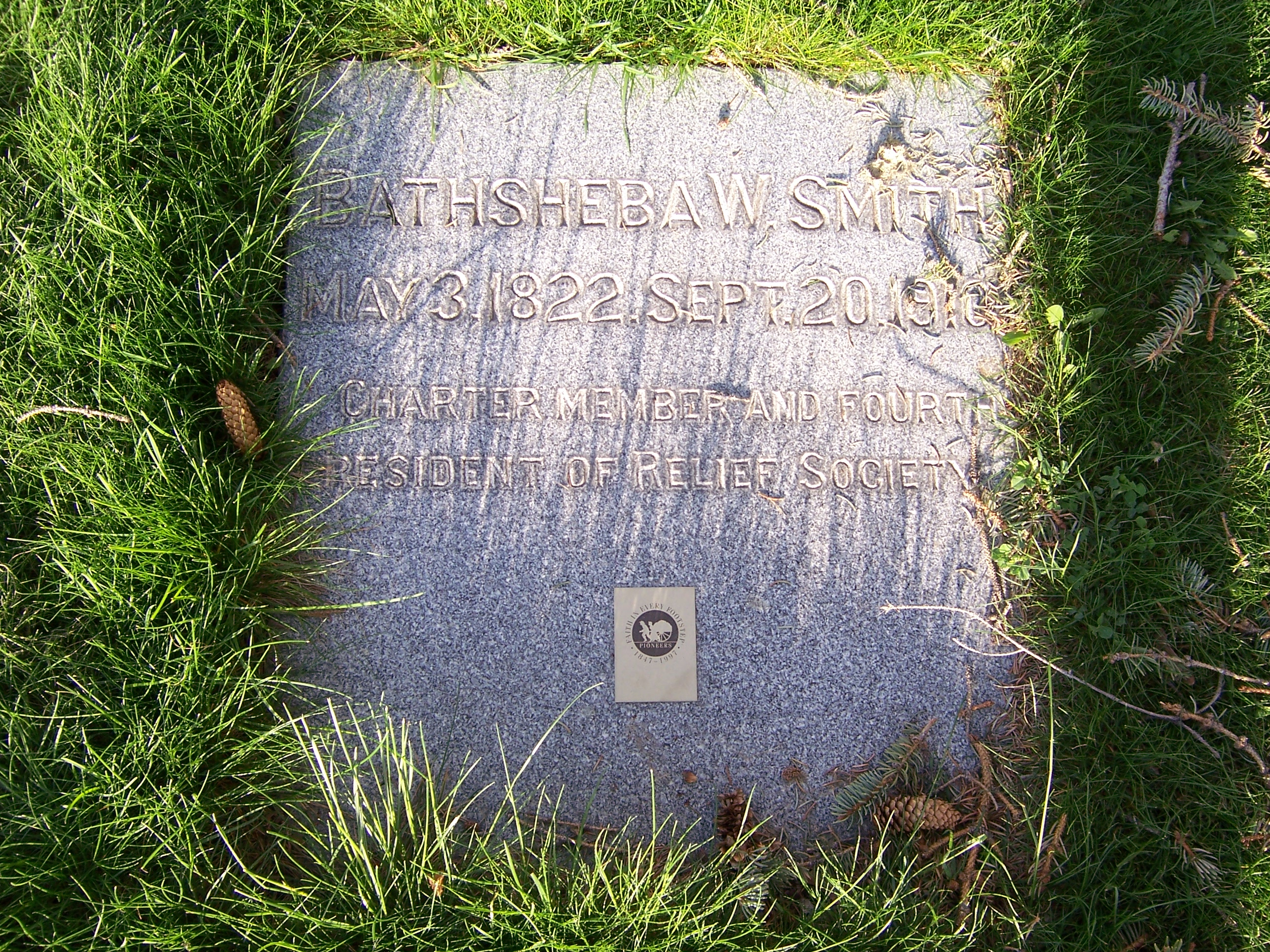
Smith's grave marker

== Death and burial ==
Smith died at her daughter's home in Salt Lake City on September 20, 1910, and was buried at Salt Lake City Cemetery. She was the first woman to have her funeral in the Salt Lake Tabernacle.

== See also ==
- Annie Taylor Hyde
- List of General Presidencies of the Relief Society

== Notes ==
The Church of Jesus Christ of Latter-day Saints titles
Preceded by Zina D. H. Young	Relief Society General President; November 10, 1901–September 20, 1910	Succeeded by Emmeline B. Wells
Preceded by Elizabeth Ann Whitney	Second Counselor in the Relief Society General Presidency; October 11, 1888–November 10, 1901	Succeeded by Ida S. Dusenberry
