= Julina Lambson Smith =

American Mormon religious leader and midwife (1849–1936)

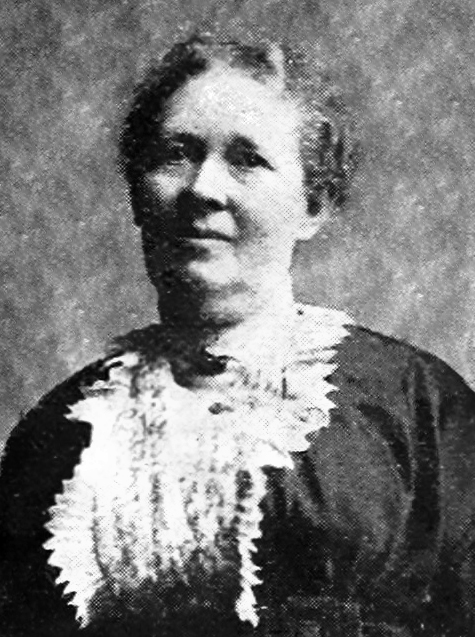
- Smith in 1915

Second Counselor in the general presidency of the Relief Society
- October 3, 1910 – April 2, 1921
- Called by: Emmeline B. Wells
- Predecessor: Ida Smoot Dusenberry
- Successor: Louise Y. Robison

Personal details
- Born: Julina Lambson; June 18, 1849; Salt Lake City, Provisional State of Deseret, United States
- Died: January 10, 1936 (aged 86); Salt Lake City, Utah, United States
- Cause of death: Myocarditis
- Resting place: Salt Lake City Cemetery; 40.777°N 111.858°W
- Spouse(s): Joseph F. Smith
- Children: 11: including: Joseph Fielding Smith; David A. Smith
- Parents: Alfred Boaz Lambson and Melissa Jane Bigler

Julina Lambson Smith (June 18, 1849 – January 10, 1936) was a leader in the Church of Jesus Christ of Latter-day Saints (LDS Church). From 1910 to 1921 she was a member of the General Presidency of the Relief Society. The second wife of Joseph F. Smith and the mother of Joseph Fielding Smith, she is the only woman in the history of the LDS Church to have been the wife of a President of the Church and the mother of another church president. She worked as a midwife in the Mormon community and delivered over 1,000 babies.

== Biography ==
Julina Lambson was born to Alfred Boaz Lambson and Melissa Jane Bigler in Salt Lake City. Her parents were Mormon pioneers who arrived in Utah in 1847. Her family's home was the first house in Salt Lake City to be plastered. As a young girl Julina would often stay with her aunt Bathsheba W. Smith and it was in her home that Julina was introduced to the idea of plural marriage. Ten years after arriving in Salt Lake Julina's family was forced to Nephi, Utah because of the Utah War. Her family and many other saints passed through great trials after being displaced from their homes.

=== Marriage and family ===
In 1866, Julina married Joseph F. Smith in the Endowment House. It was Joseph F. Smith's second marriage; Julina was his first plural wife. Joseph and Levira were divorced in 1867. On August 14 of that same year Julina had her first child, Mercy Josephine. In the next fifteen years Joseph married four more women. Julina was close friends with the two of her sister wives closer to her in age, Sarah Ellen and Julina's sister Edna. Joseph F. Smith would go on to be an apostle in the LDS Church and was the church's president from 1901 until his death in 1918. Joseph F. Smith and Julina Smith had 11 children, one of which was Joseph Fielding Smith, longtime historian and apostle of the church and president from 1970 to 1972. Another son was David Smith, who became a member of the church's Presiding Bishopric. Her son E. Wesley Smith, born in Hawaii, twice served as mission president in Hawaii. The couple also adopted two children.

Because of their polygamist lifestyle, their household was in constant need of a midwife. To find a solution, Julina went and got professional training in nursing and obstetrics. After being trained as a midwife Julina shared this new skill with many of the expecting sisters in her community and would sacrifice many long nights doing such service. She was one of the first trained midwives in Utah. When the U.S. Congress passed the Edmunds Anti-Polygamy Act of 1882 Julina and her husband went into hiding at Laie, Hawaii upon the suggestion of President Taylor. Many other LDS church leaders also went into hiding during this time. Julina and Joseph stayed in Hawaii from January 1885 until the middle of 1887, while all of their children except the youngest stayed in Utah with her sister wives. During her time in Hawaii she gave birth to two children and continued using her midwifery skills to help deliver children on the island. She also ran the missionary kitchen near their home.

After returning home from Hawaii, Smith had three more children and continued her service in the church and as a midwife. During her lifetime she delivered 1,025 babies and reportedly never lost a mother during delivery. In 1901 Joseph F. Smith was called to be the next President of the LDS church and held that position until his death in 1918. Years later after suffering a bad fall, Julina died on January 10, 1936, aged 86.

=== Church callings ===
In 1870, when the first Young Women's Retrenchment Society was first organized in Salt Lake City on a ward level, Smith was selected as one of its first ward presidents. At that time she also worked at the Endowment House and in 1892, she became a member of the general board of the Relief Society. When Emmeline B. Wells became the president of the Relief Society in 1910, she selected Smith as her second counselor. Along with first counselor Clarissa S. Williams, the presidency served until Wells died in 1921.

== Publications ==
- "A Loving Tribute to Sarah Ellen Richards Smith". Relief Society Magazine. 2 (5): 215–216. May 1915.
- "A Word of Counsel". Relief Society Magazine. 4 (12): 705–706. December 1917.
- "A Word of Counsel". Relief Society Magazine. 6 (1): 49–51. January 1919.

The Church of Jesus Christ of Latter-day Saints titles
Preceded by Ida Smoot Dusenberry	Second Counselor in the general presidency of the Relief Society; October 3, 1910 – April 2, 1921	Succeeded by Louise Y. Robison
