= Lambson =

Lambson is a surname. Notable people with the surname include:

- Barry Lambson (born 1958), South African former cricket umpire
- Julina Lambson Smith, née Julina Lambson (1849–1936), American Mormon leader
