= Emmeline B. Wells =

American journalist, editor, poet, women's rights advocate, and diarist (1828–1921)

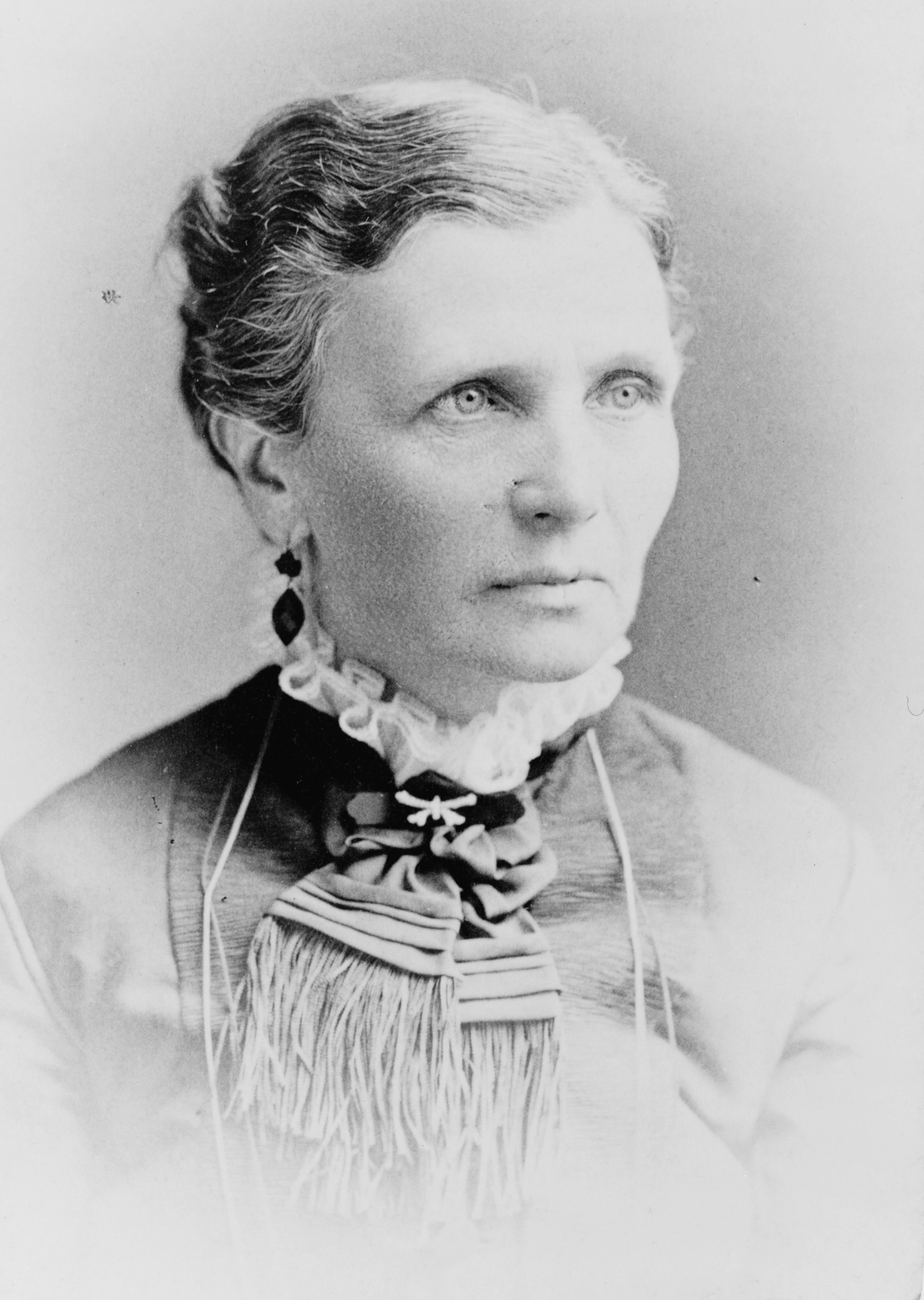

5th Relief Society General President
- October 3, 1910 – April 2, 1921
- Called by: Joseph F. Smith
- Predecessor: Bathsheba W. Smith
- Successor: Clarissa S. Williams

Personal details
- Born: Emmeline Blanche Woodward; February 29, 1828; Petersham, Massachusetts, U.S.
- Died: April 25, 1921 (aged 93); Salt Lake City, Utah, U.S.
- Resting place: Salt Lake City Cemetery; 40.7772°N 111.8580°W
- Spouse(s): James Harris (m. 1843, died); Newel K. Whitney (m. 1845; died 1850); Daniel H. Wells (m. 1852; died 1891)
- Children: 6
- Parents: David and Diadama H. Woodward
- Website: Emmeline B. Wells

Emmeline Blanche Woodward Harris Whitney Wells (February 29, 1828 – April 25, 1921) was an American journalist, editor, poet, women's rights advocate, and diarist. She served as the fifth Relief Society General President of the Church of Jesus Christ of Latter-day Saints (LDS Church) from 1910 until her death. She represented the state of Utah at both the National and American Women's Suffrage conventions and was president of the Utah Woman's Suffrage Association. She was the editor of the Woman's Exponent for 37 years. She was a plural wife to Newel K. Whitney, then Daniel H. Wells.

== Biography ==
=== Early life ===
Emmeline Blanche Woodward was born on February 29, 1828, in Petersham, Massachusetts. She was the seventh child of David and Diadama Hare Woodward. Her father died when she was four years old. She would later claim that her widowed mother inspired her to be a women's rights advocate. When her mother got remarried to Samuel Clark Jr., the Woodward family moved to North New Salem, Massachusetts. There, Emmeline spent ten years of her childhood. Religion heavily influenced her first years of life; her family attended the local village church per New England tradition. As a child, she wrote poems and stories, which she shared with her friends. She often enjoyed being in nature. Woodward was very intelligent and began studying in public school until she enrolled in the New Salem Academy. She graduated from the Academy at the age of fourteen.

The revivalist movement disrupted New Salem's previous religious unity, and Woodward's community was split among different denominations. Following her mother, siblings, and a few friends, Woodward joined the Church of Jesus Christ of Latter-day Saints on March 1, 1842. After her baptism, she returned to the Academy and continued her schooling; she did not attend church meetings for her first year of membership. When she applied to become a teacher, discrimination against her new faith proved to be a challenge. Nevertheless, she persevered and taught school briefly in Orange, Massachusetts, before her first marriage at the age of fifteen.

=== Marriages ===
She married 15-year-old James Harris, also a new church member, on July 19, 1843, in Vernon, Vermont. This marriage proved to be difficult for the young Emmeline; her mother-in-law disapproved of her, and she was unprepared for married life. Later, she wrote that she had been too emotional to make such an important decision and regretted marrying at such a young age. Life for Emmeline (now Harris) only became more difficult when she, along with the Harris family and a group of other New England Latter-day Saints, left for the Mormon settlement of Nauvoo, Illinois, in 1844. After a time, her mother- and father-in-law left the church and Nauvoo, so she and James were left alone. She gave birth to a son, Eugene Henri, on September 1, 1844. Unfortunately, Harris had been sick with "ague" during her pregnancy, and at six weeks old, her infant son became sick as well and did not survive. In addition to battling her own illness and the sorrow of losing her son, Emmeline said goodbye to her husband, who left to find work in St. Louis. He asked her to leave Nauvoo to live with his parents once more, but she refused. James Harris died as a sailor in the Indian Ocean and never returned to his wife.

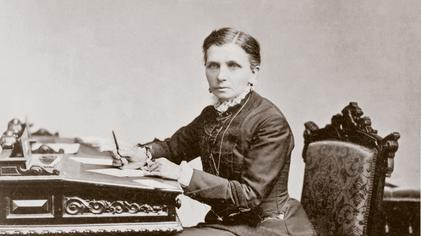
Emmeline B. Wells writing

The young Emmeline Harris returned to teaching. Through his children's attending her school, Harris met and later married Newel K. Whitney on February 24, 1845, under the Mormon practice of plural marriage. Emmeline Whitney admired her new husband and felt much safer as his wife. She left Nauvoo in 1846 and, along with the large Whitney family, left Winter Quarters, Nebraska, for Utah Territory in 1848. They traveled with the Heber C. Kimball company at the invitation of then-church president Brigham Young. During the journey, Whitney grew close to her sister-wives. She became friends with the "first wife" Elizabeth Ann Whitney in particular. During the journey west, Emmeline began recording her life experiences in the first of what would become 47 journals. She was pregnant when the company reached the Salt Lake Valley on October 8, 1848. Her first daughter, Isabel "Belle" Whitney, was born in the back of the same wagon that had carried her mother across the country; Emmeline later recounted, "our poor wagons and tents were the only homes we had." After a Whitney family home was constructed, her second daughter, Melvina Whitney, was born on August 18, 1850. Unfortunately, this good news was followed in short order by her second husband's unexpected death. Emmeline Whitney deeply mourned his passing. By age 22, she had been widowed twice. Shortly before his death, Newel Whitney had told her that she would prove to be "a tremendous influence in the building of the kingdom in the west."

Newel Whitney's death in 1850 prompted her to begin teaching school once more, as a means of providing for her daughters. She remained primarily responsible for financially supporting herself for the rest of her life. She then approached Daniel H. Wells, a friend of her late husband's and a prominent civic leader, about marriage. In 1852, she became his seventh wife. Their early marriage was distant, as Daniel Wells was heavily involved in civic and church duties and had six other families. Emmeline Wells lived separately from his other wives. She had another daughter in 1853, Emma "Emmie" Wells. When the Utah War broke out in 1857, Emmeline moved south to Provo. There, she continued to teach school. In 1859, she gave birth to her fourth daughter, Elizabeth Ann Wells, who she named after Elizabeth Ann Whitney. Her fifth daughter, Louise Martha "Louie" Wells, was then born in 1862. Thus, she and Daniel Wells had a total of three children together. Though the early years of their relationship had been difficult, the two became fond and loving companions later in life. Wells did not regret or doubt her participation in polygamy. Daniel Wells died on March 24, 1891. By the end of her life, Emmeline Wells had been widowed three times. Once her children were grown, Wells devoted herself to writing.

== Contributions ==
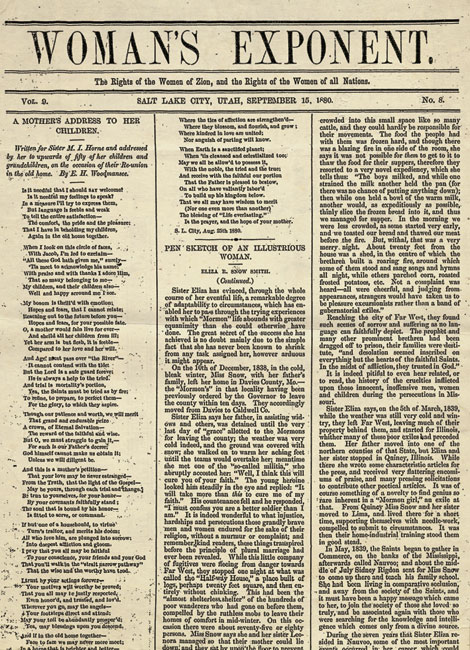
September 15, 1880, issue of the Woman's Exponent

=== Woman's Exponent ===
"The aim of the paper has always been to assist those who needed assistance in any or every line. ... We love women and would ever strive to uplift and help them to attain their ideals."

From a young age, Emmeline Wells had been writing poetry and short stories; but her career truly blossomed with the editorials she wrote for the Woman's Exponent. Established in 1872, the periodical published news about women in the LDS church along with articles advocating for women's educational, economic, and voting rights. The Exponent became part of a nationwide network of feminist journalism, exposing Wells's voice beyond Utah. She wrote many articles about women's rights, particularly the right to run for office and the right to vote. Under the pseudonym "Blanche Beechwood", she published 40 articles arguing fervently for suffrage, societal reform, and religious freedom. Wells became the Exponent's associate editor on May 1, 1875, when Cornelia H. Horne ended her term as business manager. Following Lula Greene Richards, Wells was the second and last senior editor of the periodical from 1877 to 1914. She also assumed responsibility as its publisher, business manager, and owner. As editor, she became known for her executive talents and her superb memory. She continued to publish her own essays and poems, changing her pseudonym to "Aunt Em". In response to a special request from church president Brigham Young, she wrote and compiled the life stories of many Latter-day Saint women for publication in the Exponent. Her different writing selections over the years balance feminist and romantic views, as well as her religious beliefs. The Exponent served as a space for LDS women to express their views, including those of polygamy. Near the end of her tenure as editor, Wells enlisted the help of her daughter Annie Wells Cannon as assistant editor. After her failed request to have the Exponent become the Relief Society's official publication, the suffragist periodical closed in February 1914 with Wells's last editorial titled "Heartfelt Farewell".

Wells continued to write numerous short stories and poems, many of which were published. Between 1889 and 1890, she published her autobiography, entitled "Hephzibah", disguised in the form of a novel featuring protagonist "Hepsie". The 28-chapter work was published little by little in the Exponent. She later compiled her poetry into a single volume, Musings and Memories; it was so well received that she published a second edition in 1915. Musings and Memories contained 130 of Wells's poems, the majority discussing nature, friendship, or faith. She also wrote a book of short stories. In 1912, Wells became the first Utah woman to receive an honorary degree, in literature, awarded her by Brigham Young University.

=== Women's suffrage and politics ===
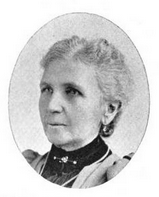
Emmeline Wells

"I believe in women, especially thinking women."

When women were enfranchised in Utah in 1870, Wells was among the first to vote in local elections. In 1871, women's rights activists Elizabeth Cady Stanton and Susan B. Anthony visited Utah during their tour of the western United States. Wells attended their conference and was inspired by their messages, especially as she reflected on her mother's life and her own limitations relative to self-sufficiency. She wished for greater freedom and independence for her five daughters. Feminist writer Margaret Fuller also inspired Wells. She became an early advocate of women's rights, writing under the name "Blanche Beechwood" for the Woman's Exponent. She did not adhere to or believe in the usual role of the submissive Victorian woman. Through her anonymous submissions, she expressed her frustration with society's views of the roles of a wife. She wrote 43 essays for the Exponent and became its editor in 1877. In addition to reporting news of the Relief Society, she used the publication to support women's suffrage, as well as educational and economic opportunities for women. She was in frequent contact with women's rights leaders and other pro-suffrage editors around the nation. The publication Woman's Words brought her writing to the east coast. In order to inspire her readers to advocate for change, she wrote 57 articles arguing for more independence for women.

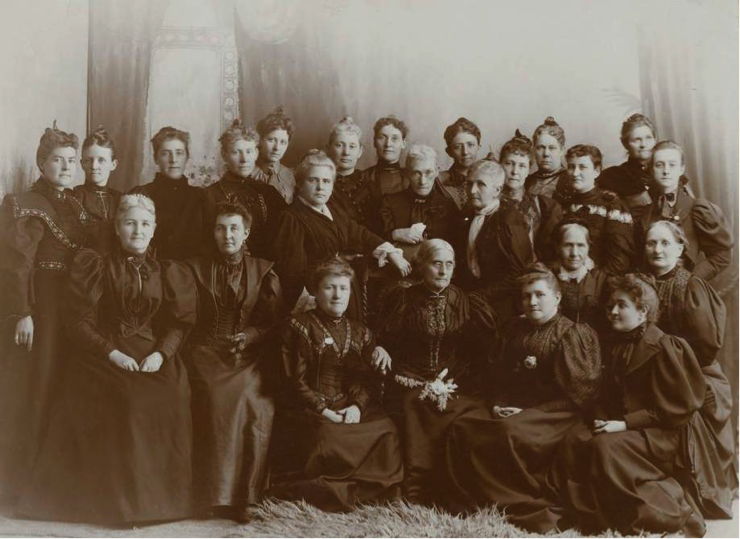
Emmeline B. Wells pictured with Women's Suffrage Leaders, including Susan B. Anthony

In 1879, Wells was appointed as a Utah representative to a suffrage convention in Washington, D.C., by national feminist leaders Stanton and Anthony. She and Zina P. Young Card were "the first official representatives of LDS women to a national women's conference." In Washington, Wells spoke against anti-polygamy legislation, especially when it threatened to disenfranchise Utah women. She and Card met with President Rutherford B. Hayes and first lady Lucy Hayes to present their case. President Hayes thanked them for sharing their perspective with him, and requested that they write down what they'd shared with him on the subject so that he could reference their words later. When President Hayes later pressed forward with anti-polygamy legislation, Wells expressed her dismay in her December 1879 editorial in the Exponent. She and Card also addressed the House Judiciary Committee and the Senate Judiciary Committee on the matter while in Washington. The two were ridiculed for attending the convention, but Stanton defended their right to be there. In addition to these national efforts, Wells was a delegate to the 1882 Utah State Constitutional Convention, where she served on the committee on education and the committee on schedule and elections. Wells joined the National Council of Women of the United States in 1891.

As early as in 1879, Wells advocated that women be granted the right to hold office in Utah Territory. In 1878, she turned down a nomination for Salt Lake County Treasurer from the People's Party because women were not eligible to hold office in the territory. In 1879, Wells, along with Sarah M. Kimball, urged Governor George Emery to support women holding office, which he declined. In 1880, she was the leading force involved in convincing Charles W. Penrose to introduce legislation to grant women the ability to hold office. She wrote that her wish to be a political representative was "not an aggressive act on the part of women but a progressive one which will remove the discrimination that exists among equal citizens."

For 30 years, Wells linked LDS women with national suffrage organizations. She gathered signatures from women in Utah to appeal to Washington, D.C., for a constitutional amendment that would grant women the right to vote. She also remained lifelong friends with Stanton and Anthony as she represented Utah in the national battle for suffrage. For nearly thirty years she represented Utah women in the National Woman Suffrage Association and the National and International Councils of Women. In 1893, Wells was elected president of the Utah Territorial Women's Suffrage Association. As such, she represented the National Council at the 1893 World's Columbian Exposition in Chicago as a speaker, session conductor, and exhibit organizer. She also traveled to Atlanta in 1895 to represent Utah at the annual NAWSA conference. Wells was also involved in the ultimately successful effort to restore suffrage to Utah women in the 1896 Utah state constitution. In 1899, she was invited by the International Council of Women to speak in London as a representative of the United States. A year before her death, Wells was able to see the passing of the 19th Amendment.

Wells served as the chairwoman of the Utah Woman's Republican League; and, after Utah gained statehood, she did run for election. In a much-publicized election, the 66-year-old Wells stood as one of several "at large" Republican candidates for state senator from Salt Lake County. Martha Hughes Cannon, a physician and former employee at the Woman's Exponent, was one of five Democrats running for the office. On November 3, 1896, Cannon defeated the field and became the first woman ever elected as a state senator in the United States.

=== Church service ===
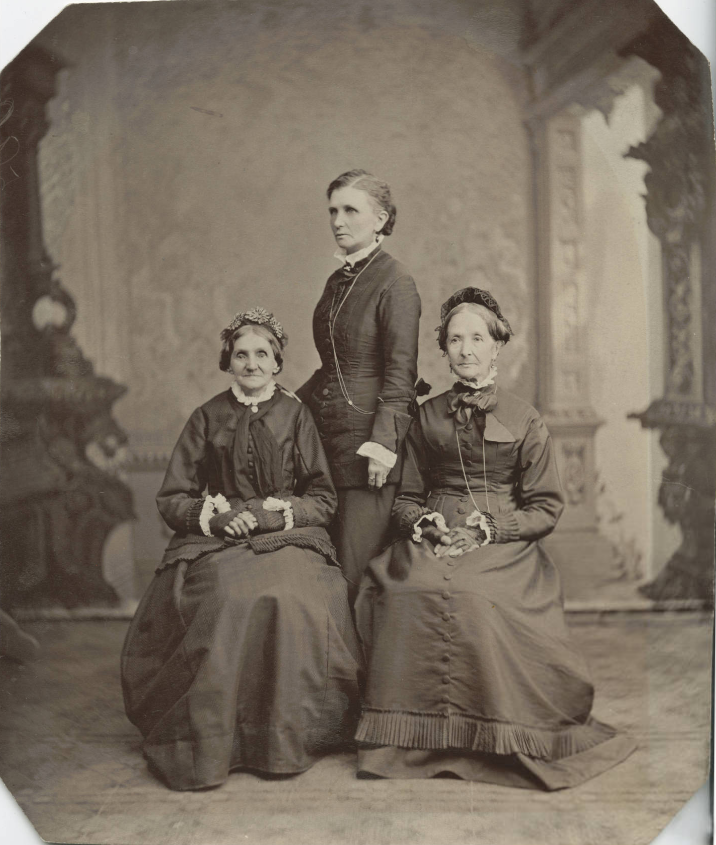
Wells (center) with Elizabeth Ann Smith Whitney (left) and Eliza R. Snow (right)

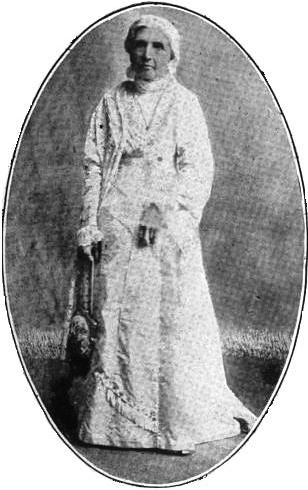
Wells while president of the Relief Society

Much of her involvement in women's rights movements, she felt, had been inspired by her involvement in the LDS Church's women's organization, the Relief Society. For many years, Wells served as its corresponding secretary, and as such was responsible for planning its 1892 jubilee celebration.

Wells then served as Relief Society General Secretary for twenty years to presidents Eliza R. Snow, Zina D. H. Young, and Bathsheba W. Smith. She led the Relief Society into involvement with the National and International Councils of Women.

In her youth in Nauvoo, Wells briefly knew Joseph Smith, founder of the church. She eventually became one of the last people living to have met Joseph Smith in person. In 1905, as Relief Society Secretary, she wrote the following to the young women of the church:

In the Prophet Joseph Smith, I believed I recognized the great spiritual power that brought joy and comfort to the Saints. ... He was beyond my comprehension. The power of God rested upon him to such a degree that on many occasions he seemed transfigured. His expression was mild and almost childlike in repose; and when addressing the people, who loved him it seemed to adoration, the glory of his countenance was beyond description. At other times the great power of his manner, more than of his voice (which was sublimely eloquent to me) seemed to shake the place on which we stood and penetrate the inmost soul of his hearers, and I am sure that then they would have laid down their lives to defend him. I always listened spell-bound to his every utterance—the chosen of God in this last dispensation.

Wells was appointed by Brigham Young in 1876 to head a church-based grain-saving program, and managed the church-wide program until the beginning of World War I. She placed advertisements for it in the Exponent. In 1919, Wells received a personal visit in her Salt Lake City home from U.S. President Woodrow Wilson, who presented her with a commendation for selling the collected wheat to the government for the war effort. Under her leadership, 200,000 bushels had been saved for this time of shortage.

Wells was called as the Relief Society's general president in 1910 at the age of 82. She served for eleven years, administering service issues related to the world war and dealing with issues relating to growth and administrative expansion. She sought to lead the organization as Joseph Smith had originally organized it. In her capacity as Relief Society General President, Wells unveiled the Seagull Monument at Temple Square in Salt Lake City in 1913. To her sorrow, the Relief Society Board declined to continue their support of the Woman's Exponent, and the publication closed in 1914.

== Death and legacy ==
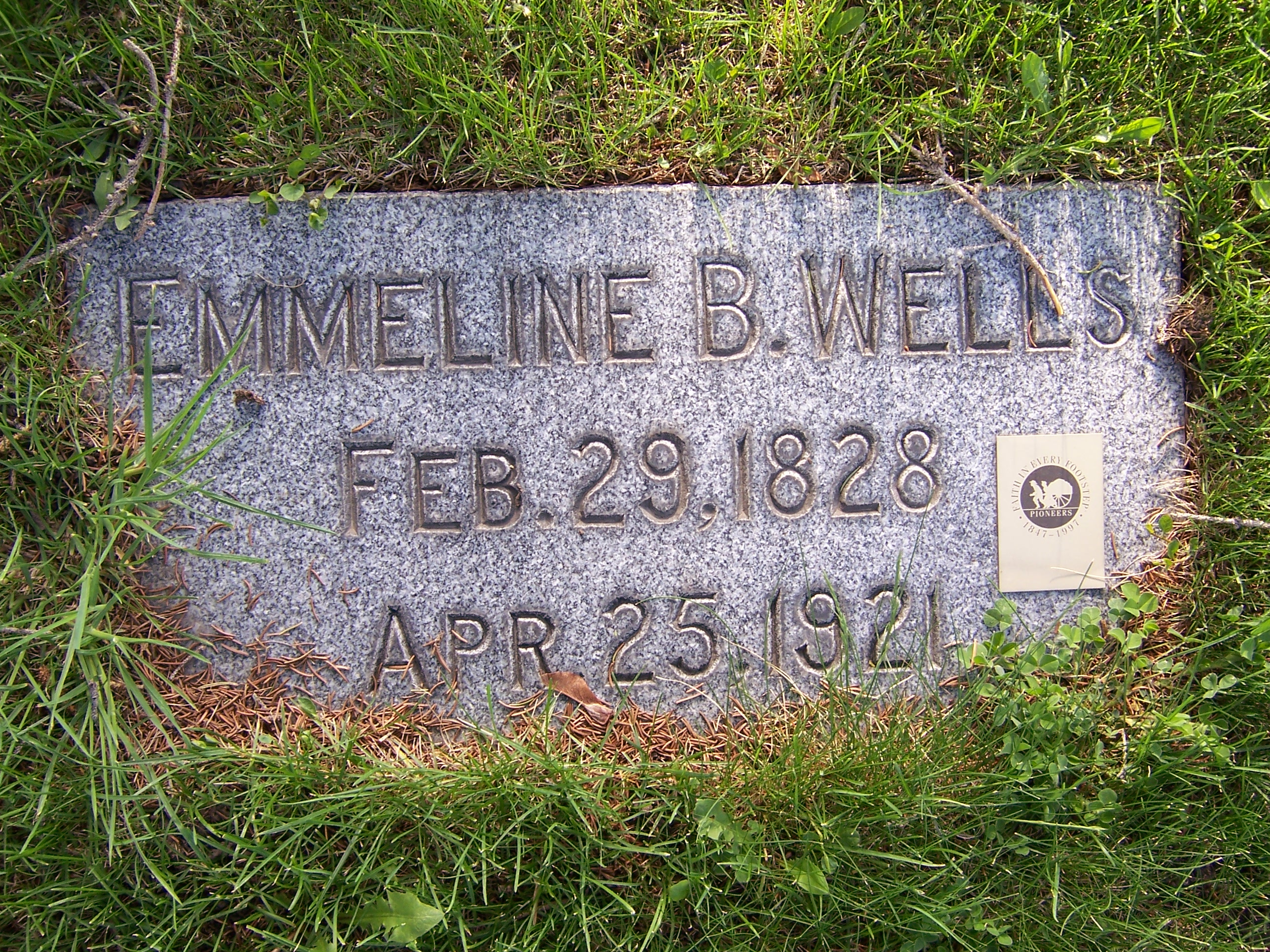
Wells's grave marker

Towards the end of her life, Wells's birthday celebrations were community events. Poor health led her to be released in 1921, at the age of 93. Wells died later that year on April 25, 1921, and was buried at the Salt Lake City Cemetery. Her first counselor Clarissa S. Williams succeeded her as Relief Society general president. Her funeral was held in the Salt Lake Tabernacle, making her the second woman ever to receive that honor. Flags on church-owned properties were flown at half mast to honor her.

During her life, Wells met with a total of three US presidents.

Wells authored the text of the Latter-day Saint hymn "Our Mountain Home So Dear", which is hymn number 33 in the church's 1985 English-language hymnal.

A bust of Wells, inscribed "A Fine Soul Who Served Us", is found in the rotunda of the Utah State Capitol. The bust was funded through the efforts of women's groups in Utah, including the feminist community, LDS women's groups, and women's groups from other church organizations and was made posthumously as a tribute to Wells. She is the only woman to receive this honor.

== Publications ==
=== Articles ===
- "Charity and Faith". Relief Society Magazine. 1 (4): 1–3. April 1914.
- "Relief Society Memories". Relief Society Magazine. 1 (5): 1–4. May 1914.
- "Loyalty". Relief Society Magazine. 1 (7): 1–2. July 1914.
- "The Grain Question". Relief Society Magazine. 1 (9): 1–3. September 1914.
- "Relief Society Conference". Relief Society Magazine. 1 (11): 1–3. November 1914.
- "Relief Society Conference". Relief Society Magazine. 1 (12): 1–3. December 1914.
- "The Mission of Saving Grain". Relief Society Magazine. 2 (2): 46–49. February 1915.
- "Augusta Joyce Crocheron". Relief Society Magazine. 2 (7): 301–303. July 1915.
- "Relief Society Conference Address". Relief Society Magazine. 6 (8): 459–461. August 1919.
- "Testimony of President Emmeline B. Wells". Relief Society Magazine. 7 (10): 561–564. October 1920.

=== Poetry ===
- "At Evening". Relief Society Magazine. 3 (9): 539. September 1916.
- "Our Lovely Human Heritage". Relief Society Magazine. 4 (2): 74–75. February 1917.
- "Spring Days". Relief Society Magazine. 14 (4): 161. April 1927.

== See also ==
- List of General Presidencies of the Relief Society

The Church of Jesus Christ of Latter-day Saints titles
Preceded by Bathsheba W. Smith	Relief Society General President; October 3, 1910 – April 2, 1921	Succeeded by Clarissa Smith Williams
