= Elizabeth Ann Whitney =

LDS Church leader (1800–1882)

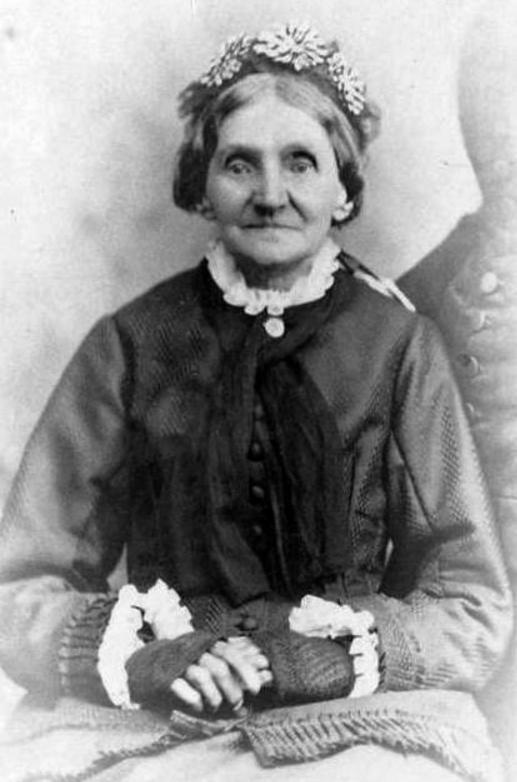
- ca. 1870

Second Counselor in the general presidency of the Relief Society
- June 19, 1880 – February 15, 1882
- Called by: Eliza R. Snow
- Predecessor: Dormant
- Successor: Bathsheba W. Smith

Second Counselor in the general presidency of the Relief Society
- March 17, 1842 – 1844
- Called by: Emma Hale Smith
- Predecessor: Founding Member
- Successor: Dormant

Personal details
- Born: Elizabeth Ann Smith; December 26, 1800; Derby, Connecticut, United States
- Died: February 15, 1882 (aged 81); Salt Lake City, Utah, United States
- Resting place: Salt Lake City Cemetery; 40.777°N 111.858°W
- Spouse(s): Newel K. Whitney
- Parents: Gibson Smith; Polly Bradley

Elizabeth Ann Smith Whitney (December 26, 1800 – February 15, 1882) was an early Latter Day Saint leader, and wife to Newel K. Whitney, another early Latter Day Saint leader. She went by her middle name, Ann.

== Early life and marriage ==
Elizabeth Ann Smith was born in Derby, Connecticut, to Gibson Smith and Polly Bradley. She was the couple's oldest child. Her parents did not attend any church, but identified as Christian, and Ann Smith later described her young self as "naturally religious." As a child, she was "carefully educated according to the customs of that early period", such as dancing and singing. When Smith was about 18 years old, she had some sort of disagreement with her mother and left home. She followed her unmarried aunt, Sarah Smith, westward to Kirtland, Ohio. In this venture, the two women displayed what Mark L. Staker, a faculty member of the LDS Church History Department, calls "a strong sense of self-reliance". Sarah Smith bought a parcel of land within the Connecticut Western Reserve, and soon one of Ann's uncles joined them in Ohio. Her father also tried to move west, but was prevented from doing so by his wife.

When she was 20 she met her future husband, Newel K. Whitney. The couple was married on October 20, 1822 after a three-year courtship. They quickly accumulated wealth and status in their community. They had eleven children together and adopted several homeless children.

=== Conversion ===
In Kirtland, Ann and her husband joined the Disciples of Christ, called the Campbellites at the time, led in the area by Sidney Rigdon. This group denied it had power to give the gift of the Holy Spirit. This, along with vague answers to Whitney's questions, caused her and her husband to pray for direction. In response to that prayer, the couple claimed to have seen a vision and a voice stating, "Prepare to receive the word of the Lord, for it is coming!"

Sidney Rigdon converted to the Church of Jesus Christ of Latter-day Saints, which had been established by Joseph Smith in April 1830. In 1830, Whitney heard of his conversion and of the missionaries who were in the area. She agreed to hear them preach, and was particularly impressed that they did not ask for any financial compensation from their audiences. She went home after hearing them speak to share with her husband that she felt it was the right church. Parley P. Pratt then taught Ann and Newel about the faith, and the two chose to be baptized in November 1830. Rigdon performed their baptisms.

Joseph and Emma Smith arrived at Newel K. Whitney's store in Kirtland in December 1830. Joseph said, "I am Joseph the Prophet; you have prayed me here; now what do you want of me?" The Smiths then stayed in their home. While there, Joseph received revelations that are recorded in Doctrine and Covenants, most likely sections 41 through 44. Whitney felt that the Joseph and Emma's coming was fulfillment of a vision she and Newel had previously witnessed, in which "a cloud of glory rested upon [their] house." They lodged with the Whitneys for a number of weeks. Joseph noticed the quality of Whitney's singing voice and accordingly dubbed her "the sweet songstress of Zion". Immediately after receiving her patriarchal blessing at the hand of Joseph Smith Sr., Whitney sang about the history and importance of Adam-ondi-Ahman in tongues. The blessing had mentioned the "gift of singing inspirationally."

Whitney and her husband hosted a three-day feast for the poor in January 1836. They lost some of their wealth when the Kirtland Safety Society Banking Company collapsed and people began persecuting members of the church.

== Traveling westward ==
Whitney and her family traveled with the members of the church. They left Kirtland to move to Far West, Missouri in the fall of 1838 due to persecution. However, when they reached St. Louis, they were informed that Latter-day Saints were being kicked out of Missouri. They settled in Carrollton, Illinois during the winter of 1838–39. They then moved to Quincy, Illinois during the next winter. By the spring of 1840, they had reached Nauvoo, Illinois, then called Commerce. When the family reached Nauvoo, most of them were sick, and Whitney had her ninth child. The couple received their endowments and were sealed in the Nauvoo Temple by Joseph Smith.

The family continued moving with the Saints, and went to Winter Quarters in February, 1846 before migrating to the Salt Lake Valley. During the difficult trek west, Whitney developed rheumatoid arthritis in her arms and legs. She also gave birth to a son, Newel M., at Winter Quarters. They arrived in Salt Lake City on September 24, 1848. Two years later, her husband died.

== LDS Church service ==
In March 1842, Whitney became one of the original leaders of the Relief Society, with Emma Hale Smith, Sarah M. Cleveland, and Eliza Roxcy Snow (who had been her acquaintance in Kirtland). Whitney served as the second counselor under Emma Smith. Whitney presided over many of the Relief Society's last meetings in Nauvoo, as Emma Smith was away travelling, ill, or struggling with Joseph Smith's doctrine of plural marriage. Ann and Newell Whitney consented for Joseph Smith to marry their daughter in 1842. Shortly after Joseph Smith's death in 1844, Newel took another wife. Ann wrote that she was "more favorably disposed to women as a class" since she had a sister wife.

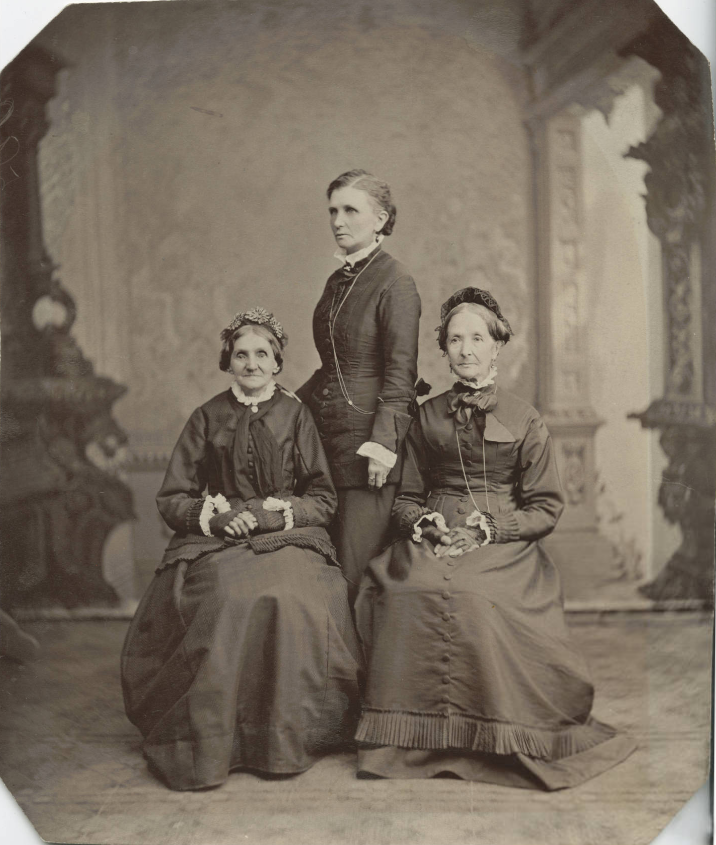
Elizabeth Ann Whitney (left) with Emmeline B. Wells (center) and Eliza R. Snow (right), ca. 1876

After the Nauvoo temple was completed, Whitney was the second woman to receive her endowment (after Emma Smith). Whitney worked there daily during the winter of 1845–46 to help other members receive their endowments. In 1850, Brigham Young called her to be in charge of the women's department of the Endowment House. Whitney also served as second counselor to Eliza R. Snow in the Relief Society presidency from 1880–82.

=== Later years ===
Beginning in August 1878, Whitney's autobiography was published in a series called A Leaf from an Autobiography in the Woman's Exponent. In November 1879, she purchased a plot of land that had previously belonged to Brigham Young.

== Death ==
Elizabeth Whitney was affectionately called "Mother Whitney" by members of the church for her service and compassion. It is noted that she had the gift of tongues, and that she even sang in tongues. Whitney also used seer stones. She died in Salt Lake City in 1882 and was buried in Salt Lake City Cemetery. At the time of her death she was the second oldest member of the LDS church. Daniel H. Wells, Lorenzo D. Young, and Joseph F. Smith spoke at Whitney's funeral and praised her for her faith and service in the church. A residence hall at Brigham Young University was named after her in 1957.

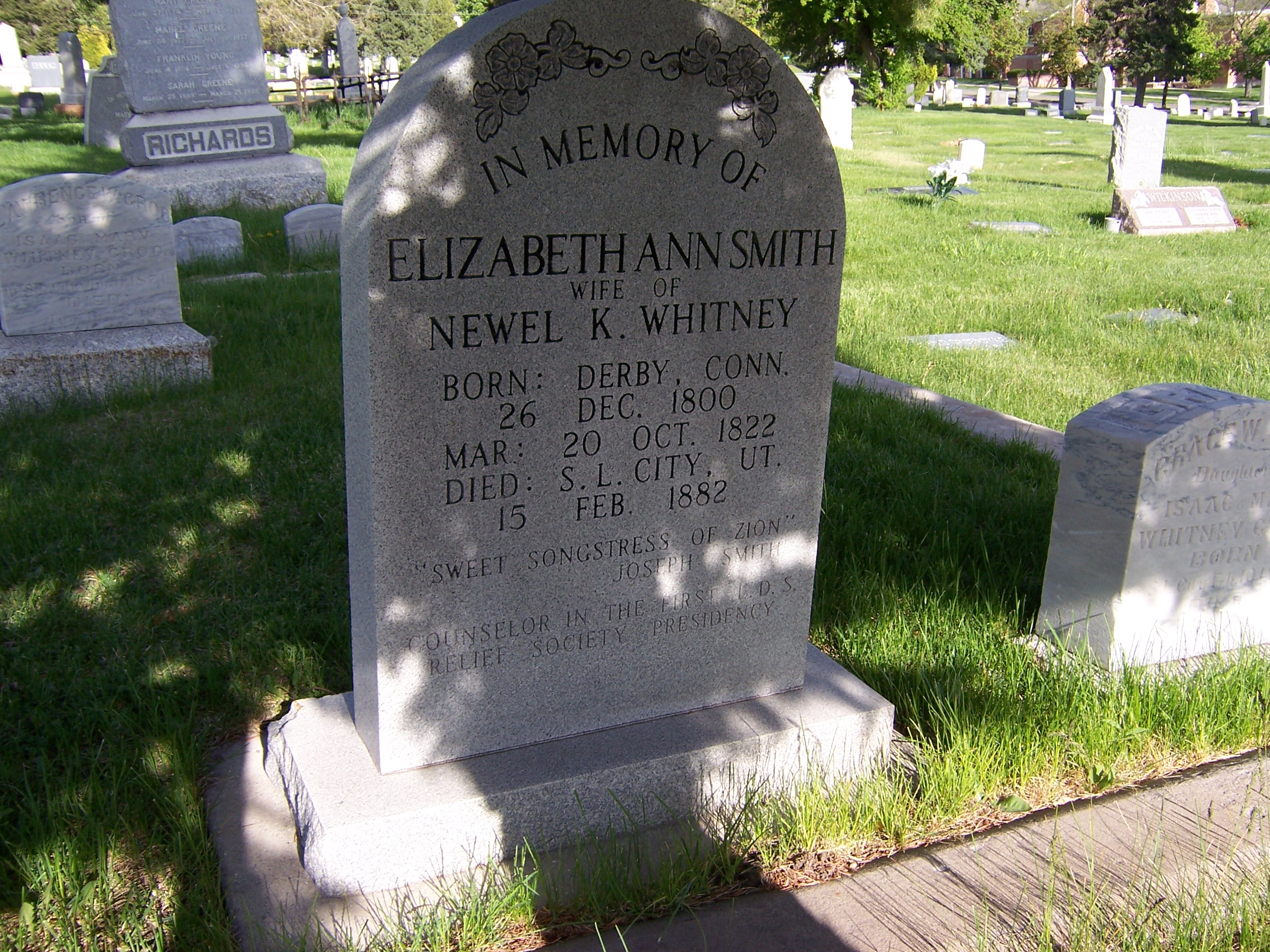
Elizabeth Ann Whitney's grave marker

== Publications ==
- Leaf from an Autobiography, p. 33, Woman's Exponent, 1 Aug, 1878
- Leaf from an Autobiography, p. 41, Woman's Exponent, 15 Aug, 1878
- Leaf from an Autobiography, p. 51, Woman's Exponent, 1 Sept, 1878
- Leaf from an Autobiography, page 71, Woman's Exponent, 1 Oct, 1878
- Leaf from an Autobiography, p. 83, Woman's Exponent, 1 Nov, 1878
- Leaf from an Autobiography, p. 91, Woman's Exponent, 15 Nov, 1878
- Leaf from an Autobiography, p. 105, Woman's Exponent, 15 Dec, 1878
- Leaf from an Autobiography, p. 115, Woman's Exponent, 1 Jan, 1879
- Leaf from an Autobiography, p. 191, Woman's Exponent, 15 Feb, 1879

Church of Jesus Christ of Latter Day Saints titles
First	Second Counselor in the general presidency of the Relief Society; March 17, 1842 – 1844	Dormant
The Church of Jesus Christ of Latter-day Saints titles
Dormant	Second Counselor in the general presidency of the Relief Society; June 19, 1880 – February 15, 1882	Succeeded by Bathsheba W. Smith
