= Brigham Smoot =

American LDS Church missionary (1869–1946)

- Born: June 15, 1869; Salt Lake City, Utah Territory
- Died: December 16, 1946 (aged 77); Pasadena, California, U.S.
- Occupations: Missionary, businessman
- Movement: American evangelism
- Parent(s): Abraham O. Smoot, Anne Kirstine Mauritzen

Brigham Roland Smoot (June 15, 1869 – December 16, 1946) was a missionary of the Church of Jesus Christ of Latter-day Saints (LDS Church) and an executive of the Utah-Idaho Sugar Company. He was one of the two first Mormon missionaries to preach in Tonga and served as president of the LDS Church's Tongan mission from July 1891 to October 1892. Smoot was the son of Abraham O. Smoot and the brother of Reed Smoot.

== Early life and family ==
Brigham Smoot was born on June 15, 1869, in Salt Lake City, Utah Territory, to Abraham O. Smoot and Anne K. Mauritsen (Note: Her name is also spelled in some sources as Anne Kirstine Mauritzen, Anne Kristine Morrison, or Annie K Morrison.), his fifth of six plural wives. Brigham's brother Reed Smoot went on to be a businessman and an apostle in the LDS Church before being elected by the state legislature as United States Senator from Utah in 1903. Smoot was baptized into the LDS Church on June 17, 1877. His family moved to the frontier town of Provo, Utah Territory, when his father was called by Brigham Young to establish a church stake there. Brigham Smoot graduated from Brigham Young Academy in Provo, a school for which his father had been the major financial backer.

== Missionary work ==
In June 1889, Brigham Smoot was sent at the age of 20 on a mission for the LDS Church to Samoa. Smoot sailed there and was assigned as a companion to Edward J. Wood. During his second day in Samoa, Smoot joined Wood and the other missionaries for a bath in the ocean. While wading in the ocean, Smoot slipped into a deep hole in the reef. After being dead for several minutes, Smoot was revived by Butler by what they described as a priesthood blessing.

Sent to open a mission in July 1891, Smoot and Alva J. Butler became the first LDS missionaries in Tonga. On July 16, 1891, they met with King George Tupou I, who granted them permission to proselyte in Tonga. The first proselyting session in Tonga was held by Smoot and Butler on August 1, 1881. On November 22, 1881, Smoot and Butler leased the first piece of land for the LDS Church. On January 24, 1892, the first official LDS church meeting was conducted by Smoot and Butler in the mission home. Smoot dedicated the mission home on May 15, 1892. He later became the president of the Tongan Mission of the LDS Church from July 14, 1891, to October 24, 1892. He returned to Utah in December 1892.

== Career ==
After returning from his mission, Brigham Smoot graduated with a degree in chemical engineering from Lehigh University in Bethlehem, Pennsylvania, in 1898. After graduation, Smoot returned to Utah and worked for the mining industry in Eureka. On June 20, 1900, he married Margaret Annella Nesbit in Provo, Utah. Roland Nesbit Smoot was born on May 7, 1901. A year later, he had a daughter named Annella Kerstina Smoot. Beginning in 1901, he worked as a supervisor for the Utah-Idaho Sugar Company, which processed sugar cane. Smoot was eventually promoted to general superintendent.

After he retired in 1937, he moved to Pasadena, California. He lived there until his death on December 16, 1946.
