= Relief Society =

Women's organization of The Church of Jesus Christ of Latter-day Saints

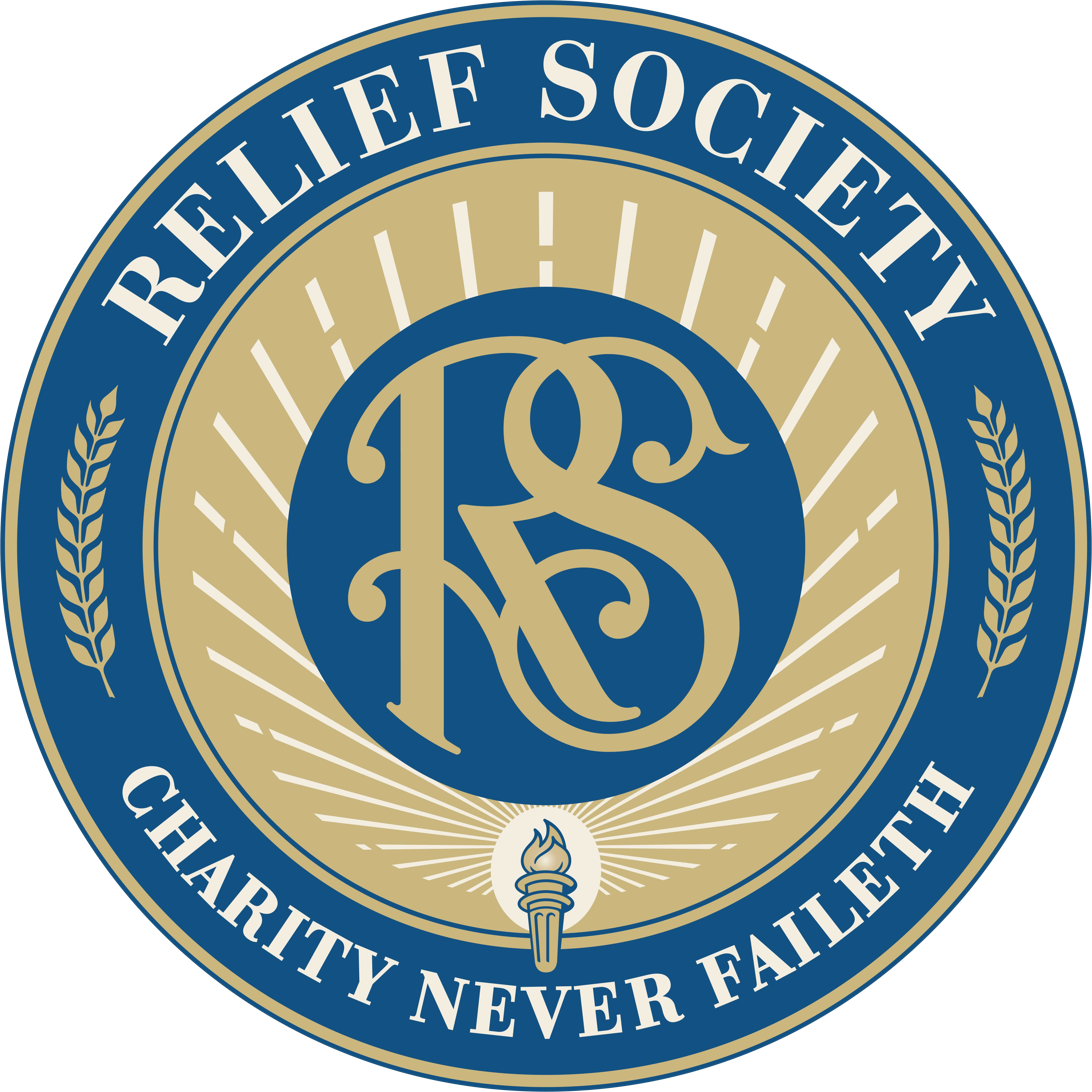
- Formation: March 17, 1842
- Type: Non-profit
- Purpose: Gospel instruction, women's/familial support, humanitarian aid
- Headquarters: Salt Lake City, Utah, United States
- Members: Over 7 million women, in over 188 countries
- General President: Camille N. Johnson
- Parent organization: The Church of Jesus Christ of Latter-day Saints
- Website: www.churchofjesuschrist.org/learn/organizations/relief-society

The Relief Society is a philanthropic and educational women's organization of the Church of Jesus Christ of Latter-day Saints (LDS Church). It was founded in 1842 in Nauvoo, Illinois, United States, and has more than 7 million members in over 188 countries and territories. The Relief Society is often referred to by the church and others as "one of the oldest and largest women's organizations in the world."

== Mission ==
The motto of the Relief Society, taken from 1 Corinthians 13:8, is "Charity never faileth." The purpose of Relief Society reads, “Relief Society helps prepare women for the blessings of eternal life as they increase faith in Heavenly Father and Jesus Christ and His Atonement; strengthen individuals, families, and homes through ordinances and covenants; and work in unity to help those in need.”

== History ==
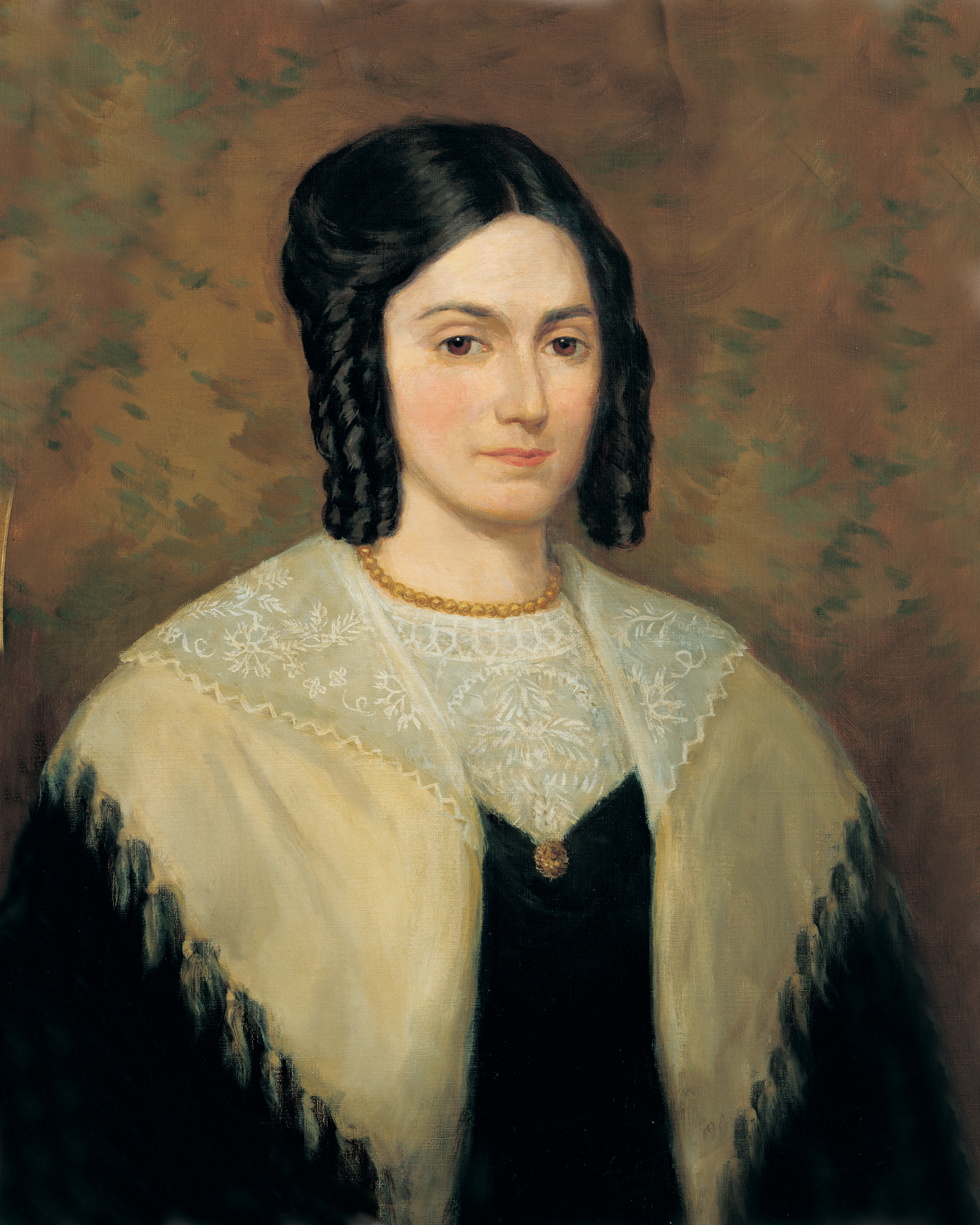
Emma Smith, wife of Joseph Smith, was the first General President of the Relief Society.

=== Nauvoo Period ===
In the spring of 1842 Sarah Granger Kimball and her seamstress, Margaret A. Cook, discussed combining their efforts to sew clothing for workers constructing the Latter Day Saints' Nauvoo Temple. They determined to invite their neighbors to assist by creating a Ladies' Society. Kimball asked Eliza R. Snow to write a constitution and by-laws for the organization for submission to President of the Church Joseph Smith for review. After reviewing the documents, Smith called them "the best he had ever seen" but said, "this is not what you want. Tell the sisters their offering is accepted of the Lord, and He has something better for them than a written constitution. ... I will organize the women. .. after a pattern of the priesthood."

Twenty Latter Day Saint women gathered on Thursday, March 17, 1842, in the second-story meeting room over Smith's Red Brick Store in Nauvoo to discuss the formation of a Ladies' Society with Smith, John Taylor, and Willard Richards. Joseph Smith proposed the society elect a presiding officer and allow that officer to choose two counselors to aid her. Emma Smith was elected as president and then chose her two counselors, Sarah M. Cleveland and Elizabeth Ann Whitney. The three members of the Presidency were then ordained and blessed by Taylor. At the meeting Joseph Smith stated "the object of the Society—that the Society of Sisters might provoke the brethren to good works in looking to the wants of the poor—searching after objects of charity, and in administering to their wants—to assist; by correcting the morals and strengthening the virtues of the female community, and save the Elders the trouble of rebuking; that they may give their time to other duties, &c., in their public teaching."

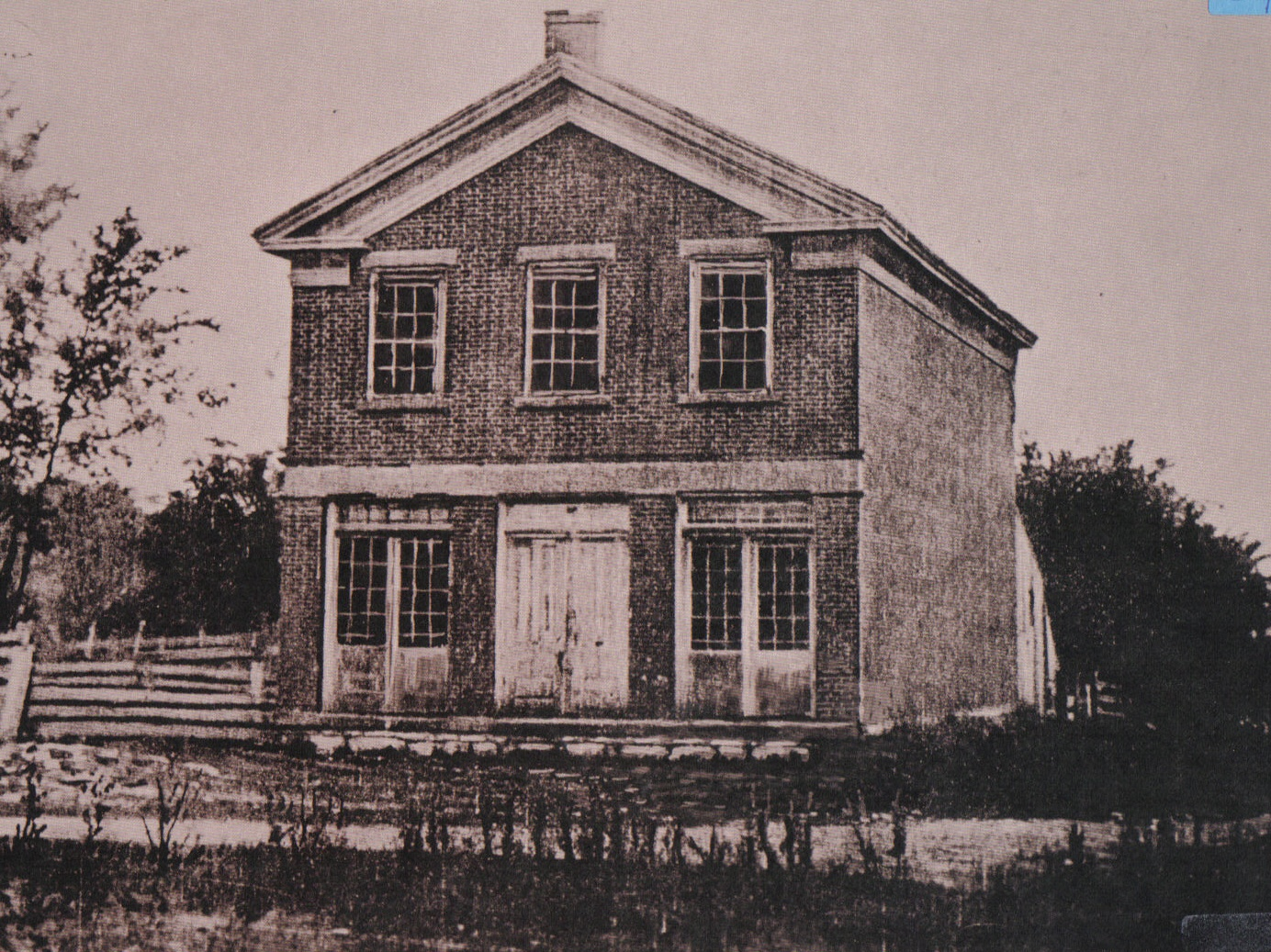
Red Brick Store where the Relief Society was organized

After discussion, it was unanimously agreed that the fledgling organization be named "The Female Relief Society of Nauvoo". The new organization was popular and grew so rapidly that finding a meeting place for such a large group proved difficult. Under Emma Smith's direction, the Society was "divided for the purpose of meeting" according to each of the city's four municipal wards. Visiting committees were appointed to determine needs in each ward. By March 1844, membership totaled 1331 women. The last recorded meeting of the Relief Society in Nauvoo was held on March 16, 1844. Smith had often used the Relief Society as a pulpit to express her opposition to plural marriage. However, several of the society's members and leaders were themselves secretly in plural marriages, including to Smith's own husband, who himself counseled the society against exposing iniquity. These inner conflicts led Joseph Smith to suspend all meetings of the organization. After the death of Joseph Smith in June 1844, Brigham Young assumed leadership of the majority of Latter Day Saints. Desiring to continue plural marriage, Young disbanded the Relief Society before leaving Nauvoo for the Salt Lake Valley.

=== Moving west ===
When Relief Society secretary Eliza R. Snow joined the Latter Day Saints in their exodus west in 1846, she carried the Relief Society Book of Records with her. Although they no longer met in an official capacity, women continued to assemble informally; the care and nurture of the needy continued without a formal Relief Society organization.

As Saints established homes in the Salt Lake Valley and surrounding settlements, formal meetings for women gradually emerged. A Female Council of Health was established in 1851. In early 1854, in response to Brigham Young's call to Saints to assist neighboring Native Americans, women from several Salt Lake City wards decided to organize an "Indian Relief Society" with the purpose of "making clothing for Indian women and children." In June 1854, Brigham Young encouraged women to form societies in their individual wards. Members of the first Indian Relief Society disbanded to help establish organizations in their own wards, many of them becoming leaders. Records are limited but show that by 1858 over two dozen organizations had formed in some twelve Salt Lake City wards and in other outlying settlements such as Ogden, Provo, Spanish Fork, and Manti, Utah.

Each Relief Society operated independently within its ward in cooperation with the local bishop. Ward societies were not interconnected by central women's leadership, though many of them engaged in similar activities such as sewing clothing for Indians, caring for the poor, especially emigrants, and weaving carpets for local meetinghouses. Interrupted by the 1858 Utah War, no more than three or four of these independent ward organizations survived the temporary move of much of the Latter-day Saint population south of Salt Lake County.

=== Reorganization and expansion ===
14th Ward Relief Society Hall circa 1893

In December 1867 church president Brigham Young publicly called for the reorganization of Relief Society in every ward. Eliza R. Snow was assigned to assist local bishops in organizing permanent branches of the Relief Society. Using the minutes recorded in the early Nauvoo meetings as a Constitution, Snow created a standard model for all local wards that united women in purpose and provided a permanent name and structure to their organization. She and nine other sisters began visiting wards and settlements in 1868, and at the end of the year, organizations existed in all twenty Salt Lake City congregations and in congregations in nearly every county in Utah. Women helped the bishop of the ward assist the poor by collecting and disbursing funds and commodities. They nursed the sick, cleaned homes, sewed carpet rags for local meeting houses, planted and tended gardens, promoted home industry, and shared doctrinal instruction and testimony.

Snow provided central leadership both before and after her call as General President in 1880. She emphasized spirituality and self-sufficiency. The Relief Society sent women to medical school, trained nurses, opened the Deseret Hospital, operated cooperative stores, promoted silk manufacture, saved wheat, and built granaries. In 1872, Snow provided assistance and advice to Louisa L. Greene in the creation of a woman's publication, the Woman's Exponent, which was loosely affiliated with the Relief Society. Emmeline B. Wells succeeded Greene and continued as editor until its final issue in 1914.

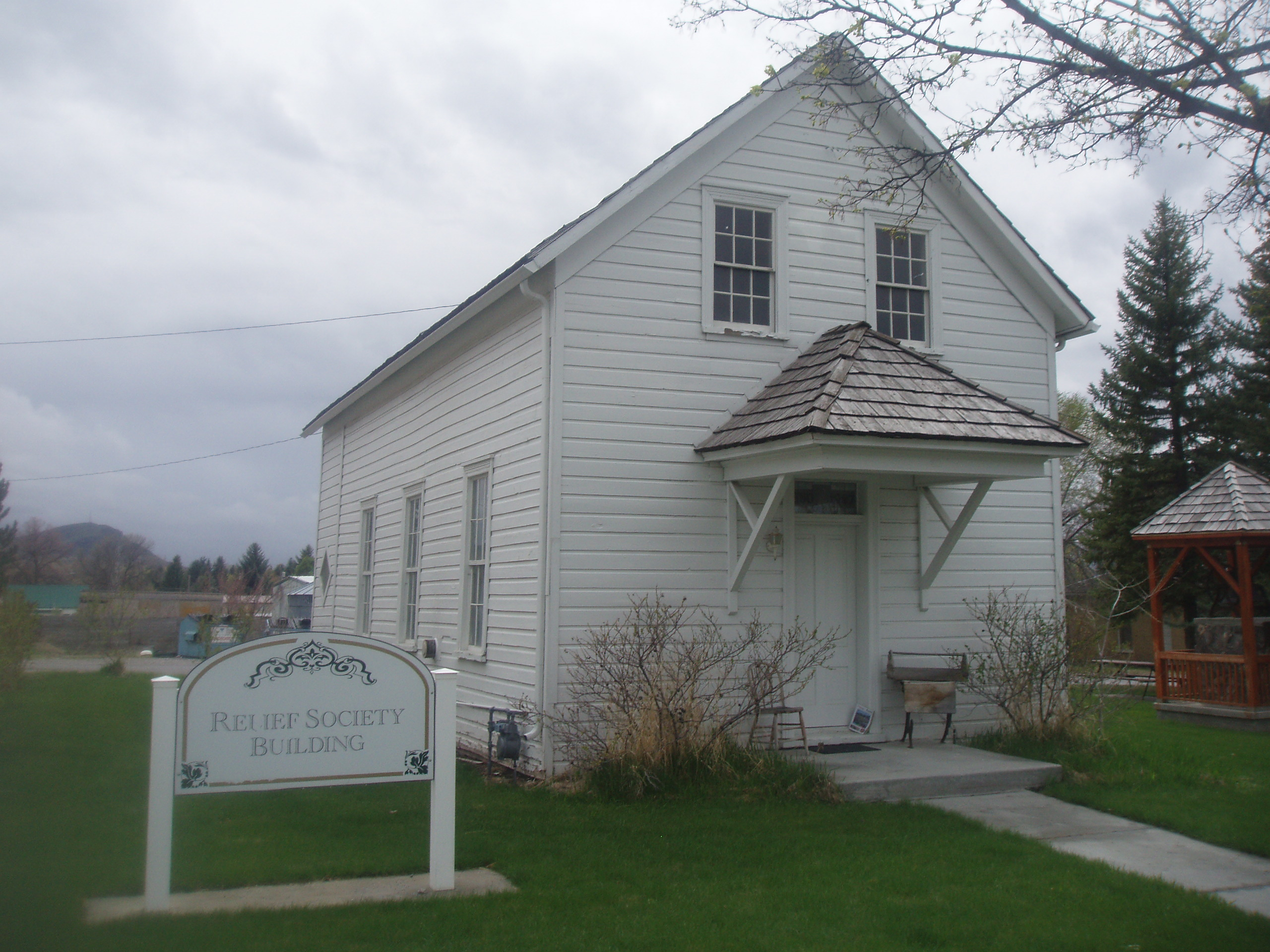
Richmond, Utah Relief Society Hall. Built in 1880, one of the oldest known original Relief Society Halls.

Snow, Mary Isabella Horne, and others established the Ladies' Cooperative Retrenchment Association from which the Young Ladies' Department of the Ladies' Cooperative Retrenchment was formed (later called the Young Ladies' Mutual Improvement Association and now the Young Women). Snow also worked with Aurelia Spencer Rogers to establish the first ward Primary Association in 1878. By 1888, the Relief Society had more than 22,000 members in 400 local wards and branches. In 1891, the Relief Society became a charter member of the National Council of Women of the United States and it was called the National Women's Relief Society.

Early Relief Society meetings were generally held semi-monthly. One meeting per month was devoted to sewing and caring for the needs of the poor. At meetings members might receive instruction, discuss elevating and educational topics, and bear testimony. The women were also encouraged to explore and develop cultural opportunities for their community.

=== The 20th century ===
The Relief Society Magazine became the official publication of the Relief Society from 1915 to 1970. By 1942, membership in the organization was approximately 115,000 women, growing to 300,000 members in 1966. In June 1945, the General Board changed the organization's official name to "Relief Society of The Church of Jesus Christ of Latter-day Saints".

The church-wide implementation of Priesthood Correlation in the 1960s "radically transformed" the Relief Society. These changes assisted in preparing the Relief Society for an era of a worldwide church; correlated lessons and materials were easier to translate and applicable to a broader audience. A side-effect of these changes was that the Relief Society lost much of the autonomy that it once enjoyed, notably around its budget. The Relief Society Magazine's last edition was December 1970, after which it and several other church magazines were replaced with the Ensign.

== Structure and meetings ==
In the LDS Church today, every Latter-day Saint woman, on the following year, and women under 18 who are married, move into Relief Society from the Young Women. Additionally, unwed teenage mothers who are seventeen or older and who choose to keep the child are advanced into Relief Society. There are no fees or membership dues for joining the Relief Society.

In each local congregation of the church, a member of the Relief Society serves as the local president of the organization. The president selects two other women from the congregation to assist her as counselors; together the three women make up the local Relief Society presidency. The Relief Society presidency acts under the direction of the bishop or branch president in presiding over and serving the women in the congregation. Additionally, stake or district Relief Society presidencies exist to supervise five or more local Relief Society presidencies.

Following changes made in 2019, Relief Society holds meetings twice per month that last approximately fifty minutes. During these meetings, an educational lesson is presented by a member of the Relief Society presidency or another woman who has been asked to serve as the instructor. From 1997 to 2016, the curriculum was composed primarily of Teachings of Presidents of the Church. As of 2019, recent general conference messages largely comprise the curriculum. The Relief Society also leads the LDS Church's efforts to teach basic literacy skills to those members and non-members that lack them.

According to the church, as of February 2020, the Relief Society has over 7 million members in 188 countries and territories, having grown from about 6 million in 170 territories in 2009.

=== Governance ===
Three women are selected by the First Presidency to serve the entire LDS Church as the General Relief Society Presidency. Although these women are not considered general authorities, they are based in Salt Lake City and are considered to be "general officers" of the church and are the highest ranking women in the LDS Church's hierarchy. Similar to other general authorities and officers in the church, they serve under the direction of the church's First Presidency. Since August 2022, the General Relief Society Presidency has been composed of Camille N. Johnson, president; J. Anette Dennis, first counselor; and Kristin M. Yee, second counselor. They are assisted and advised by a Relief Society Advisory Council drawn from women in the church.

From the 1970s to 2013, the Relief Society held a general meeting in Salt Lake City, annually in late September, which was broadcast around the world via television and radio, and later the Internet. This meeting was an opportunity for the General Relief Society Presidency to address the entire body of the Relief Society. Typically, a member of the church's First Presidency also spoke to the women of the church.

In 2014, such meetings (along with the March General Young Women Meeting) were replaced by a biannual women's meeting held in March and September, one week before the other sessions of general conference. The meeting is for all women of the church ages eight and older. The first of these meetings was held in March 2014 and the general presidents of the Primary, Young Women, and Relief Society General Presidencies spoke along with Henry B. Eyring of the First Presidency. Beginning in 2018, the annual Women's Session of the church's general conference is held in October, in the evening, as part of the regular Saturday schedule.

== Relief Society Building ==
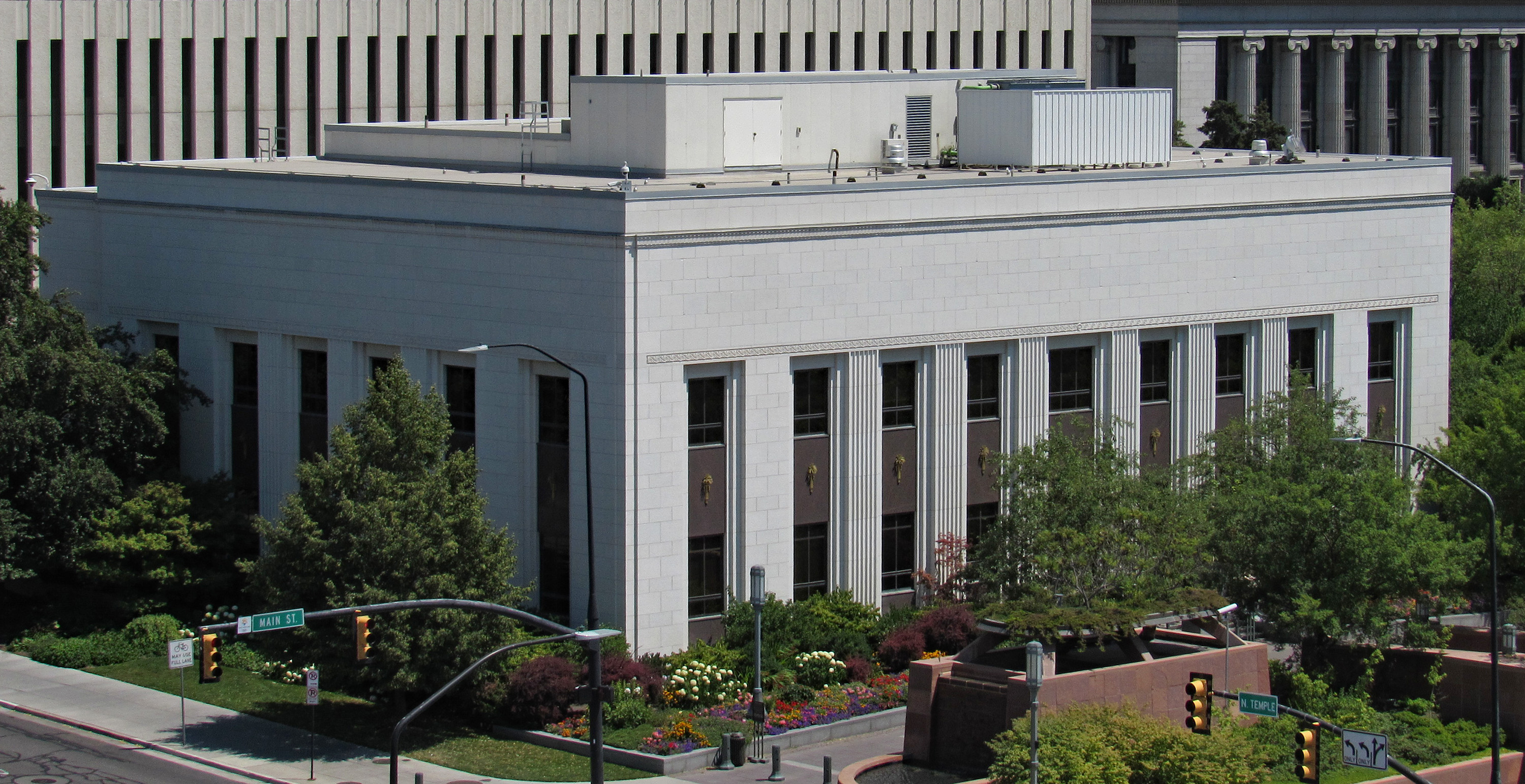
The Relief Society Building in Salt Lake City, Utah

In Salt Lake City, the Relief Society occupies its own headquarters building known as the Relief Society Building, which is separate from the other administrative offices of the LDS Church. While the Quorum of the Seventy had a building in Nauvoo in the 1840s, the Relief Society is the only auxiliary organization in the LDS Church today which has a completely separate facility. This building is also the closest of any building to the door of the Salt Lake Temple.

== Programs ==
=== Ministering sisters ===
In every LDS congregation, each member of the Relief Society is paired with another member; this companionship is then assigned by the Relief Society Presidency to be ministering sisters of one or more other members of the Relief Society. Ministering sisters strive to make regular contacts with the women assigned to them. Sometimes this contact is a personal visit in the member's home. If this is not possible, the member may be contacted by telephone, letter, e-mail, or a visit in a location other than the member's home. Ministering sisters are encouraged to look for opportunities to serve the individuals to whom they minister.

On April 1, 2018, during the church's general conference, church president Russell M. Nelson announced that the similar program of visiting teaching, along with the priesthood's home teaching, would be retired, to be replaced with the "ministering"-brethren-and-sisters program, with its dual components under the direction of the ward's elders quorum and Relief Society's respective leaderships.

=== Compassionate service ===
Along with the bishop or branch president, the Relief Society President is the key person in the ward in ensuring that the temporal and emotional needs of the members of the congregation are met. The Relief Society Presidency is responsible for helping the women of the congregation learn welfare principles such as work, self-reliance, provident living, personal and family preparedness, and compassionate service of others. In many congregations, the Relief Society will ask a woman to serve as the Compassionate Service Leader, who is responsible for organizing service activities and responses to members' needs in times of emergency or hardship.

=== Activity/enrichment meetings ===
An evening Relief Society meeting is usually held quarterly on a week-night in each congregation of the church. At this meeting women learn a variety of skills, participate in service projects, and enjoy time together. Local congregations may also choose to hold monthly or weekly meetings for women with similar needs and interests. These extra meetings are informal, and local congregations have a wide discretion in determining what activities will be part of these meetings. These meetings were originally called "Homemaking", and on January 1, 2000, the name changed to "Home, Family, and Personal Enrichment", or "Enrichment" for short. In September 2009, due to the complexity of the name and different interpretations of the meeting's purpose, the separate name for the extra weekday meetings was discontinued and all meetings of the Relief Society began to be referred to simply as "Relief Society meetings".

== See also ==
- Family Services
- Mormon feminism
- Worship services of The Church of Jesus Christ of Latter-day Saints
