= George Reynolds (Mormon) =

British Mormon leader (1842–1909)

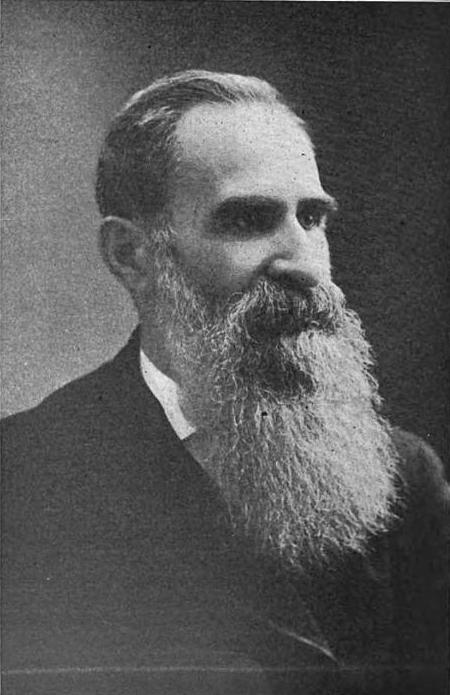

First Council of the Seventy
- April 5, 1890 – August 9, 1909

Personal details
- Born: January 1, 1842; Marylebone, London, United Kingdom
- Died: August 9, 1909 (aged 67); Salt Lake City, Utah, United States
- Resting place: Salt Lake City Cemetery; 40.777°N 111.858°W
- Spouse(s): Mary A. Tuddenham (m. 1865); Amelia J. Schofield (m. 1874); Mary Goold (m. 1885)
- Children: 32
- Parents: George Reynolds; Julia A. Tautz

George Reynolds (January 1, 1842 – August 9, 1909) was a general authority of the Church of Jesus Christ of Latter-day Saints (LDS Church), a longtime secretary to the church's First Presidency, and a party to the 1878 United States Supreme Court case Reynolds v. United States, the first freedom of religion case to issue from that court.

== Early life ==
Reynolds was born in Marylebone, England, to George Reynolds and Julia Ann Tautz. He spent much of his childhood under the care of his maternal grandmother. His grandmother employed a maid, Sarah White, who invited nine-year-old Reynolds to attend an LDS Church meeting with her. Reynolds received permission from his grandmother to do so; Reynolds attended a sacrament meeting of the church's Paddington Branch with White, and almost immediately decided that he wished to become a member.

Reynolds's parents refused to allow him to be baptized a member of the church. Often, he would disobey his parents and attend church in Paddington. When Reynolds was 14 years old, he attended the church's Somers Town Branch and asked to be baptized. Reynolds was baptized on May 4, 1856; Reynolds was confirmed a member of the church by the branch president, George Teasdale, on May 11, 1856.

In December 1856, Reynolds was given the Aaronic priesthood and ordained to the office of deacon. In May 1857, at the age of 15, Reynolds was ordained to the office of priest. Reynolds engaged in open-air preaching in the streets of London, usually with an adult elder of the church. After Reynolds began street preaching, his parents discovered that he had become a Latter-day Saint.

In August 1860, Reynolds was given the Melchizedek priesthood and ordained to the office of elder. In May 1861, he was called to be a full-time missionary of the church in London. In 1863, Reynolds was reassigned as a missionary to the Liverpool area to work as a clerk for church apostle and mission president George Q. Cannon. When Cannon returned to the United States later that year, Reynolds retained his position as a clerk under the new mission president, apostle and counselor in the First Presidency, Daniel H. Wells. As mission clerk, Reynolds organized and coordinated efforts to assist European church members in emigrating to Utah Territory. While acting as mission clerk, Reynolds was asked to serve as the branch president of the Liverpool Branch.

== Life in America ==
In May 1865, Reynolds was released as a missionary and invited to emigrate to Utah Territory. He traveled to Salt Lake City with fellow elders of the church, William S. Godbe and William H. Sherman, arriving on July 5, 1865. On July 22, 1865, Reynolds married his first wife, Mary Ann Tuddenham. Soon afterwards, LDS Church president Brigham Young hired Reynolds as secretary to the First Presidency. Reynolds was ordained to the priesthood office of seventy by Israel Barlow on March 18, 1866.

In February 1869, Reynolds was elected and served as a member of the board of regency of the University of Deseret, which was later renamed the University of Utah. Reynolds was re-elected to this position by the legislature a number of times.

In May 1871, Young asked Reynolds to assist apostle Albert Carrington in publishing the Millennial Star, a church newspaper for British Latter-day Saints. In September of 1871 Carrington was required to return to the United States, leaving Reynolds as the de facto president of the church's European Mission. However, Reynolds was suffering from ill health due to a severe case of smallpox, and when Carrington returned in May 1872, Reynolds was sent home to Utah to recover.

Like many early Latter-day Saints, Reynolds practiced the religious principle of plural marriage. On August 3, 1874, Reynolds married his second wife, Amelia Jane Schofield. At this time, Young continued to employ Reynolds as the secretary to the First Presidency and also appointed him to be the manager of the Salt Lake Theatre. In 1875, Reynolds was elected as a member of the Salt Lake City Council.

== Party to polygamy test case ==
In 1874, strong efforts were being made to prosecute Latter-day Saints who practiced polygamy in violation an 1862 Morrill Anti-Bigamy Act. Confident that the law would be declared to be an unconstitutional violation of the Free Exercise Clause of the First Amendment to the United States Constitution, the leaders of the church agreed to furnish a defendant for a test case. Young asked Reynolds if he would be willing to serve as the test defendant. Reynolds agreed and was indicted for bigamy by a grand jury on June 23, 1874.

Because it was a test case the church wished to pursue before the United States Supreme Court, Reynolds cooperated with investigators and the trial court, supplying the witnesses and testimony that proved he was married to two women at the same time. Reynolds was found guilty by a jury in April 1875 and was sentenced to one year's imprisonment and a fine of three hundred dollars. On appeal, the indictment was overturned by Utah Territory's Supreme Court because the grand jury had not been empaneled in compliance with the Poland Act. Thus, for the test case to proceed, Reynolds had to be reindicted and retried.

On October 30, 1875, Reynolds was indicted a second time; he was found guilty of bigamy by a jury on December 9 and sentenced to two years imprisonment of hard labor and a fine of five hundred dollars. On June 13, 1876, the Utah Supreme Court upheld the conviction.

=== Reynolds v. United States ===
Arguments were heard in the Reynolds case before the United States Supreme Court on November 14, 1878. On January 6, 1879, the Court issued its unanimous decision for Reynolds v. United States. The court rejected his argument that the Latter-day Saint practice of plural marriage was protected by the Free Exercise Clause of the First Amendment to the Constitution. Thus, his conviction was upheld, without the hard labor clause, as was the constitutionality of the Morrill Anti-Bigamy Act.

=== Imprisonment ===
Reynolds had been imprisoned in Utah since his second conviction was confirmed by the Utah Supreme Court in June 1876. After his failed appeal to the Supreme Court, Reynolds was transferred from a jail in Utah to the Nebraska State Penitentiary in Lincoln, where he became U.S. Prisoner Number 14 and was appointed to be the knitting department bookkeeper. Reynolds was in the Nebraska penitentiary for 25 days, after which he was transferred to the Utah Territory Penitentiary. Reynolds reported that the prisoners were not permitted to have a fire for fear that the prison would burn down. Reynolds was released from prison on January 20, 1881, having served his full sentence, less five months for good behavior. He was pardoned in 1894 by U.S. President Grover Cleveland.

== Life after release from prison ==
Upon his release from prison, Reynolds resumed his position as secretary to the First Presidency; he also became an active organizer within the Deseret Sunday School Union (DSSU), acting as the editor of and writing many articles for its publication, the Juvenile Instructor. From 1899 until his death in 1909, Reynolds was a first or second assistant to three general superintendents of the DSSU: George Q. Cannon, Lorenzo Snow, and Joseph F. Smith.

On April 26, 1885, Reynolds married his third and final wife, Mary Goold. His first wife, Mary Ann, died on December 17, 1885, following the birth of a child.

In 1890, LDS Church president Wilford Woodruff asked Reynolds to become one of the seven members of the First Council of Seventy, a calling in the church hierarchy that ranked just below the Quorum of the Twelve Apostles. Reynolds agreed, and in April, Reynolds was set apart to this position by Lorenzo Snow, who was then president of the Quorum of the Twelve Apostles. Reynolds continued in this position and as the secretary to the First Presidency until his death in 1909.

Reynolds became active in writing religious literature after his release from prison. His most famous works are his Story of the Book of Mormon (1888), which was intended for children; Complete Concordance to the Book of Mormon (1900); and Dictionary of the Book of Mormon (1910).

Reynolds suffered a stroke in 1907 as a result of stress incident from overwork. He died from meningitis at Salt Lake City on August 9, 1909, at the age of 67. Reynolds had three wives and 32 children. One of his daughters married Joseph Fielding Smith.

== Published works ==
- —— (1868). "Man and His Varieties: The Negro Race". Juvenile Instructor. 3 (20). LDS Church: 157–58.
- —— (1879). The Book of Abraham: Its Authenticity Established as a Divine and Ancient Record: With Copious References to Ancient and Modern Authorities. Salt Lake City, Utah: Deseret New Printing & Publishing.
- —— (1883). The Myth of the "Manuscript Found," or, The Absurdities of the "Spaulding Story". Salt Lake City, Utah: Juvenile Instructor Office.
- —— (1888). The Story of the Book of Mormon. Salt Lake City, Utah: Jos. Hyrum Parry. pp. 494.
- —— (1900). A Complete Concordance to the Book of Mormon. Salt Lake City, Utah: Deseret Book.
- —— (1891). A Dictionary of the Book of Mormon: Comprising its Biographical, Geographical and Other Proper Names. Salt Lake City, Utah: Jos. Hyrum Parry. p. 364.
- —— Janne M. Sjödahl (1955). Commentary on the Book of Mormon. Salt Lake City, Utah: Deseret Book.
- —— Janne M. Sjödahl (1965). Commentary on the Pearl of Great Price. Salt Lake City, Utah: Deseret Book.
- —— (1882). "Internal Evidences of the Book of Mormon: Showing the Absurdity of the 'Spalding Story'". Juvenile Instructor. 17 (15–16). LDS Church: 235–38, 251–52.
- —— (1882). "The Originator of 'The Spalding Story'". Juvenile Instructor. 17 (17). LDS Church: 262–63.
- —— (1882). "The Book of Mormon and the Three Witnesses". Juvenile Instructor. 17 (18). LDS Church: 281.
- —— (1882). "Joseph Smith's Youthful Life". Juvenile Instructor. 17 (19). LDS Church: 299–302.
- —— (1882). "Time Occupied in Translating the Book of Mormon". Juvenile Instructor. 17 (20). LDS Church: 315–317.

== See also ==
- 1890 Manifesto
- Alice Louise Reynolds
- Edmunds Act
- Edmunds–Tucker Act
- Reed Smoot hearings
- Ruth H. Funk
- Second Manifesto
- Phrenology and the Latter Day Saint Movement
