= Yesharah Society =

American LDS Church group for women

- Founded: December 1928; 97 years ago University of Utah
- Type: Social and service
- Affiliation: Church of Jesus Christ of Latter-day Saints
- Status: Active
- Emphasis: LDS Church missionaries
- Scope: Local
- Chapters: 5+
- Former name: Y Missionary Women
- Headquarters: Salt Lake City, Utah; United States

The Yesharah Society is a social organization of the Church of Jesus Christ of Latter-day Saints (LDS Church) for women who have returned from serving as missionaries. The organization was created in December 1928 under the name Y Missionary Women. In 1932, the name of the society was changed to Yesharah, a Hebrew word meaning upright, just, good, or pleasing. The Yesharah Society reached its peak popularity in the 1950s and 1960s, but began to decline at the end of the 20th century. Although the organization still exists today, most of the chapters are beginning to fade away.

== History ==
=== Beginnings ===
Single Latter-day Saint women have been missionaries for the LDS Church since 1898, when Amanda Inez Knight Allen and Lucy Jane Brimhall Knight received their calling to serve in the British Isles. However, few women were missionaries until the early 1920s. In 1915, the First Presidency, Joseph F. Smith, Anthon H. Lund, and Charles W. Penrose, stated that they were "greatly in need of lady missionaries in the United States Missions". With a growing number of returning missionary women, there was a need and a desire to form an organization of returned women missionaries.

The Yesharah Society did not begin as an independent group: from 1915 to 1929, both female and male returned missionaries were included in the Young Doctors of Divinity Club, or Y.D.D. On November 11, 1928, the YDD was invited to reorganize as part of the Friars' Club, an all-male Christian organization. An initial vote was taken by the Y.D.D. on the issue, and the motion to join the Friars' Club failed. However, several of the male members of the Y.D.D. and the University of Utah Friars' Club attempted this reorganization anyway. Finally, BYU President Franklin S. Harris assessed the situation and stated that the Y.D.D. would only be able to reorganize into the Friars' Club if the "lady missionaries" were reorganized into their own club as well.

=== Y Missionary Women constitution ===
After Harris's announcement, the "lady missionaries" acted on their own before the Y.D.D was dissolved. In December 1928, returned sister missionaries of the Y.D.D invited other female missionaries to meet with them at the home of Amanda Inez Knight Allen, who held the prominent position of being the first single sister missionary for the LDS Church. There, under the direction of Barbara Maughn Roskelly, this group of women formed the "Y Missionary Women" group, electing Allen as the first president. Some of the initial members of the Y Missionary Women included, along with Allen and Knight, Elizabeth Souter, Georgia Maesar, Anna Boss Hart, Alice Louise Reynolds, and others. In the earliest years of the group there were approximately 40 members, of whom 34 were single and six were married. Although the Y Missionary Women reorganized itself before the Y.D.D. could vote to exclude them, it was not something that the Y.D.D. women originally wanted to do; they fought against reorganization, and it would remain a bitter memory for the Yesharah Society even into the late 1950s.

At its founding in December 1928, the Y Missionary Women took part of the Friars' Club Constitution and placed it word-for-word in their own. This statement outlined the intentions of the Y Missionary Women as to "keep ever paramount in the lives of its members the high and worthy ideals [of manhood] which they have promulgated while active in the missionary field" and to "promote educational, cultural, and social development in the members of the organization". To these first two purposes copied from the Friars' Club, the Y Missionary Women added three others:

1. To be a sister in every deed to each and every member,
2. Uphold the ideals and promote the interests of the educational institutions with which this organization shall be affiliated, and
3. Give special encouragement to our sisters laboring in the mission field."

The qualifications to be a member of the organization were threefold: to have been "regularly called to and honorably released" from an LDS Mission, be in good standing with the church, and be affiliated with BYU. From the beginning, the emphasis of the organization was placed on missionary work. The "Y Missionary Women" rejected the word "club" so that it would be clear that the women were to be a missionary organization with local chapters.

=== Organization of the Yesharah Society ===
In 1932, at the suggestion of BYU professor Sidney Sperry, the Y Missionary Women changed its name to Yesharah. The new society further organized itself; its revised 1932 constitution stated that the organization's executive officers would consist of a president, first and second vice presidents, recording secretary-treasurer, and a corresponding secretary. In addition there were to be three committees within the society: membership, program, and project. The annual dues at the time were US$2.00 per member, and members were to be organized in to more local chapters, the first of which was the Provo Chapter. The emphasis within the newly named society continued to be missionary work. The Yesharah Society had high ideals, as characterized by a 1932 Yesharah Poem:

Should mission memories be forgot and never brought to mind?
Should we forget the days we spent in service to mankind?
Oh know we'll strive our very best to ever keep in mind.
The lessons we to others taught, the way of life to find.
And here's a vow, my sisters true we'll make anew this day
That we shall teach in faith and love the truths that point the way.

The Yesharah Society's constitution ensured that the organization would remain professional and purpose-centered, specifying that the constitution and by-laws were to be read biannually, and that all meetings would be conducted according to Robert's Rules of Order. As the Yesharah Society evolved and its purposes changed in the following years, its constitution reflected those changes.

== Symbols ==
The "Y" in Y Missionary Women referred to Brigham Young University (BYU)). Selected in 1932, the name Yesharah is a Hebrew word for "bearers of light", also meaning upright, just, good, or integrity.

== Chapters ==
Following is an incomplete list of Yesharah Society chapters

Chapter	Charter date and range	Institution	Location	Status	Ref.
	1931	University of Utah	Salt Lake City, Utah		
Provo	1932		Provo, Utah		
Logan			Logan, Utah	Active	
Orem			Orem, Utah		
Salt Lake			Salt Lake City, Utah		

== Notable members ==
- Inez Knight Allen, missionary, Democratic national committeewoman, and political candidate
- Elizabeth Fetzer Bates, musician
- Jennie B. Knight, missionary and First Counselor in the general presidency of the Relief Society
- Alice Louise Reynolds, the first woman to be a full professor at Brigham Young University

== See also ==
- Christian sororities
- Delta Phi Kappa (formerly
- List of women's clubs
