= Elizabeth Fetzer Bates =

American musician

Elizabeth Fetzer Bates (March 30, 1909 – November 20, 1999) was an American Latter-day Saint musician, most noted for being the author of the children's songs "Book of Mormon Stories" and "Pioneer Children Sang As They Walked".

== Biography ==
Bates was born in Salt Lake City, Utah to John Fetzer, an architect, and his wife Margaret Baer. She was the older sister of Emil B. Fetzer. Elizabeth graduated from LDS Business College. From late 1928 to 1930, she served as a Mormon missionary in the Northern States Mission of the Church of Jesus Christ of Latter-day Saints (LDS Church), based in Chicago. In 1931, she established a Yesharah Society at the University of Utah, where women who had returned from missions could keep in contact with each other.

In 1934 Elizabeth married Lucian Bates in the Salt Lake Temple. They eventually had six children. Bates also worked as a legal stenographer.

Although Bates lost her sight in an accident in 1951, she was still an active member of her community and her church. For a time Bates was the executive secretary to Utah governor Herbert B. Maw. She served a mission again in the 1970s, with her husband, in Washington state.

Bates earned several degrees at the University of Utah, a Bachelor of Science in Sociology, a Bachelor of Arts in Music, a Master of Arts in 1959, followed by a PhD, developing a new system of coding music for blind musicians. She taught piano and composed music. She was also a member of the Mormon Tabernacle Choir. Besides "Book of Mormon Stories", Bates also wrote the song "Pioneer Children Sang As They Walked", described as "Perhaps the most familiar and best loved .. song". Bates had been inspired to write the song after meeting 104-year-old Ruth May Fox, who as a child had traveled on foot and by wagon to Utah. Both songs are included in the LDS Church's Children's Songbook.
