= List of Mormon missionary diarists (Europe) =

This is part of the list of Mormon missionary diarists, covering diarists who served full-time missions in Europe.

Country/Region	Name	Mission	Years served	Notes
British Isles	Brown, Lorenzo	Leeds Conference	1875–1876	
British Isles	Hale Jr., Alma Helaman	Ireland	1889–1891	
British Isles	Knight, Amanda Inez	Cheltenham Conference	1898–1900	first female missionary to serve unaccompanied by a husband
British Isles	Lyman, Albert Robison	Leeds Conference	1899–1900	
British Isles; Great Britain	Paxman, James Walter	London Conference	1883–1886; 1926–1927	called to serve (1883–1886); voluntary mission with wife (1926–1927)
British Isles	Richards, Stayner	Newcastle Conference; British Mission	1908–1910; 1950–1952	called to serve (1908–1910); mission president (1950–1952)
British Isles	Rowe, Edward Morris	Irish Conference	1903–1906	
British Isles	Rogers, Andrew Locy	Ireland and Scotland	1909–1910	
British Isles	Turley, Theodore		1838–1840	
Germany	Jensen, Doyle S.	Germany	1908–1928	
Great Britain	Ajax, William	Dyffyn Conway and Anglesea Conference, Eglyes Fach Conference, Monmouthshire Conference, Welsh Mission	1854–1862	alternated working and performing missionary labor during this time period
Great Britain	Anderson, George Edward	London Conference	1908–1911	
Great Britain	Bunting, James Lovett	Norwich and Manchester Conferences; Liverpool Conference	1853–1858; 1878–1880	
Great Britain	Campbell, Robert Lang	Scotland	1843–1845; 1850–1854	preached without formal mission call (1843–1845), called to serve (1850–1854)
Great Britain, Western Europe	Cannon, Abraham Hoagland	London Conference, Nottingham Conference, Swiss and German Mission	1879–1882	
Great Britain	Maughan, William Harrison		1875–1876	
Great Britain	Clayton, William	Manchester; Sheffield and Lincolnshire Conferences	1837–1840; 1852–1853	
Great Britain	Farmer, James	Leicestershire; Leeds Conference	1844–1853; 1880–1882	
Great Britain	Harper, Charles Alfred	Norwich Conference	1852–1855	
Great Britain	Hatch, Abram C.	Birmingham Conference, Manchester Conference	1864–1867	
Great Britain	Huntington, Oliver Boardman	England, Wales	1846–1847	
Great Britain	Jackson, Newton Rumell	Liverpool Conference, Lancaster	1911–1913	
Great Britain	Johnson, Alma	Nottingham Conference	1893–1896	
Great Britain	Jones, Albert	London Conference	1884–1886	
Great Britain	Jones, Samuel Stephen	London and Sheffield Conferences	1872–1873	
Great Britain, Western Europe	Lyman, Richard Roswell	European Mission	1836–1838	
Great Britain	Lyon, John	Worcestershire Conference, Scotland Glasgow Conference	1844–1853	
Great Britain	Macfarlane, Daniel Sinclair	Scotland	1876–1878	
Great Britain	Nye, Ephraim Hesmer	London Conference	1882–1884	
Great Britain	Richards, Joseph Hill	Scottish Conference	1891–1893	
Great Britain	Smoot Jr., Abraham Owen	London Conference	1875–1877	
Great Britain	Stevenson, Alfred Walter	1921–1923		
Great Britain	Stockman, Margaret Reid	West European Mission, North Scottish Mission	1964–1965	
Great Britain, Western Europe	Talmage, James Edward	European Mission	1924–1928	
Great Britain	Thatcher, Moses	Cheltenham Conference, Birmingham Conference	1866–1868	
Great Britain	Williams, Daniel Edward	Wales	1847–1853	
Scandinavia (Denmark)	Christensen, Christen N.	Aalborg Conference	1900–1902	
Scandinavia (Sweden)	Johnson, Gustaf Henry	Goteborg Conference	1905–1908	
Scandinavia (Sweden)	Johnson, John Peter	Goteborg Conference	1902–1904	
Scandinavia (Norway)	Swenson, John Ephraim	Christiania Conference	1902–1905	
Scandinavia	Van Cott, John	Scandinavia Mission	1852–1856; 1859–1862	served two terms as Scandinavian mission president
Western Europe	Burgess, Ernest Hungate	Swiss-German Mission	1904–1907	
Western Europe	Hill, Richard Nephi	Holland, Great Britain, Germany, France, Belgium	1892 - ?; 1897 - ?	unknown duration of both missions
Western Europe	Parrish, Boyd Stanley	Swiss-German Mission	1924–1927	
Western Europe	Smith, John Lyman	Swiss-Italian Mission; Switzerland	1855–1857; 1861–1864	
Western Europe	Woodruff, Abraham Owen	Swiss-German Mission	1893–1896	
Western Europe	Young, Levi Edgar	Swiss Mission	1901–1904	
