= Janne M. Sjödahl =

Janne Mattson Sjödahl (29 November 1853 – 23 June 1939) was a Swedish convert to the Church of Jesus Christ of Latter-day Saints (LDS Church) and was the author of influential commentaries on LDS Church scriptures. Sjödahl was among the first commentators to advance a "limited geography model" for the theorized geography of the Book of Mormon.

== Early life and Baptist minister ==
Sjödahl was born in Karlshamn, Blekinge, Sweden. Sjödahl and his parents were members of the Lutheran Church of Sweden, but on 11 August 1869 he was baptized into the Baptist Church in Karlshamn. In 1870, Sjödahl entered the Baptist Bethel Seminary in Stockholm. He completed his studies in June 1872 and became the Baptist minister in Eskilstuna. In 1873, he became the Baptist minister in Västervik.

In 1874, Sjödahl moved to England and enrolled in Spurgeon's College in London, where he graduated with a degree in divinity in 1876. While in England, Sjödahl mastered English and also specialized in Greek and Hebrew. In addition to knowing Swedish and Norwegian from his childhood, Sjödahl would also master the German, Icelandic, and Arabic languages.

From 1876 to 1886, Sjödahl was the Baptist preacher in Trondheim, Norway. In 1879, he was elected as the inaugural general secretary of the Norwegian Baptist Union.

On 28 August 1879, Sjödahl married Ane Marie Johnson. His wife died on 16 August 1883 a few weeks after giving birth to their second child, who also died around the same time.

== Excommunication and conversion to Mormonism ==
On 8 June 1886, Sjödahl was excommunicated from the Baptist Church, possibly on charges of adultery. Around the same time, Sjödahl became associated with Ferdinand Friis Hintze, a Danish missionary from the LDS Church. Following his excommunication, Sjödahl travelled to Utah Territory to further investigate Mormonism. On the sea journey, his son Janne Jr. died.

After arriving in Utah Territory, Sjödahl settled in Sanpete County, where a large number of Scandinavian Latter-day Saints had settled. On 7 October 1886, Sjödahl was baptized into the LDS Church in Manti.

== Life in Manti ==
Upon settling in Manti, Sjödahl became the editor of the Manti Sentinel newspaper.

When the LDS Church's Manti Utah Temple was completed in May 1888, Sjödahl became the first individual to receive his Endowment in the new temple. On 30 May 1888, Sjödahl and Christina Christofferson were married in the Manti Temple by Apostle Francis M. Lyman; they were the first couple married in the new temple. His second wife died in 1910.

== Church translator and missionary ==
In 1888, Sjödahl completed a church-approved translation of the LDS Church's Doctrine and Covenants into Swedish. In 1927, Sjödahl translated the Pearl of Great Price into Swedish, and in 1935 he completed the third revised translation of the Book of Mormon into Swedish.

Upon the completion of the translation, Sjödahl was asked by church president Wilford Woodruff to go on a mission to Palestine. In January 1889. Sjödahl arrived in Jaffa. He learned to speak Arabic and preached in Palestine for one year, organizing a branch of the church in Jaffa. In January 1890, Sjödahl was asked to go to Bern, Switzerland to complete his mission. He arrived back in Utah Territory in July 1890.

== Newspaper editor and publications ==
Upon returning to Utah, Sjödahl became employed by the Deseret News newspaper in Salt Lake City. From 1906 to 1914, Sjödahl was the chief editor of the newspaper. In 1914, Sjödahl returned to England and became an editor of the LDS Church's Millennial Star in Liverpool.

In 1917, Sjödahl and LDS Church Apsotle Hyrum M. Smith, who was the president of the church's European Mission, together worked on A Commentary on the Doctrine and Covenants. While Sjödahl wrote most of the text, it was reviewed and approved by Smith. When Doctrine and Covenants Commentary was first published in 1919 in Liverpool, it was a church-approved publication and only Smith was listed as an author. However, subsequent publication of Doctrine and Covenants Commentary have acknowledged Sjödahl as its coauthor. Doctrine and Covenants Commentary is still cited frequently by Latter-day Saint authors and commentators.

Upon returning to Utah in 1919, Sjödahl became an editor for the church's Improvement Era magazine, in which he published more than 50 of his own articles. In 1920, Sjödahl worked with George F. Richards and James E. Talmage in revising the footnotes in the Book of Mormon; Sjödahl's work was incorporated into the LDS Church's 1920 English edition of that publication. In 1923 and 1924, he assisted Talmage in revising his church-approved book Articles of Faith.

In 1927, Sjödahl published An Introduction to the Study of the Book of Mormon, an apologetic work and one of the founding works in the area of Book of Mormon studies. In this work, Sjödahl advanced an early version of the "limited geography model" of the Book of Mormon, one of the first authors to do so.

Sjödahl was also the editor of the LDS Church's German, Danish–Norwegian, Dutch, and Swedish newspapers in Salt Lake City from 1919 until they ceased publication in 1935.

When Sjödahl died in 1939, he had partially completed an extensive commentary on the Book of Mormon. In 1955, Sjödahl's material was taken by his son-in-law, Philip C. Reynolds, and combined with some materials by church general authority George Reynolds and published under their names the seven-volume Commentary on the Book of Mormon. In 1965, Philip Reynolds published under the same names Commentary on the Pearl of Great Price.

== Publications ==
- George Reynolds and Janne M. Sjödahl (1955) (Philip C. Reynolds, ed.). Commentary on the Book of Mormon (7 vols.) (Salt Lake City, Utah: Deseret News Press)
- —— and —— (1965) (Philip C. Reynolds, ed.). Commentary on the Pearl of Great Price (Salt Lake City, Utah: Deseret News Press)
- Janne M. Sjödahl (1927). An Introduction to the Study of the Book of Mormon (Salt Lake City, Utah: Deseret News Press)
- —— (1913). The Reign of Antichrist, or, The Great Falling Away: A Study in Ecclesiastical History (Salt Lake City, Utah: Deseret News Press)
- Hyrum M. Smith and Janne M. Sjödahl (1955, 2d ed.). The Doctrine and Covenants Containing Revelations Given to Joseph Smith Jr., the Prophet, with an Introduction and Historical and Exegetical Notes (Salt Lake City, Utah: Deseret News Press) [originally published in 1919 as A Commentary on the Doctrine and Covenants]

== See also ==
- David S. King: grandson
- Jody Olsen: great-granddaughter
