= Hyrum M. Smith =

American Mormon leader (1872–1918)

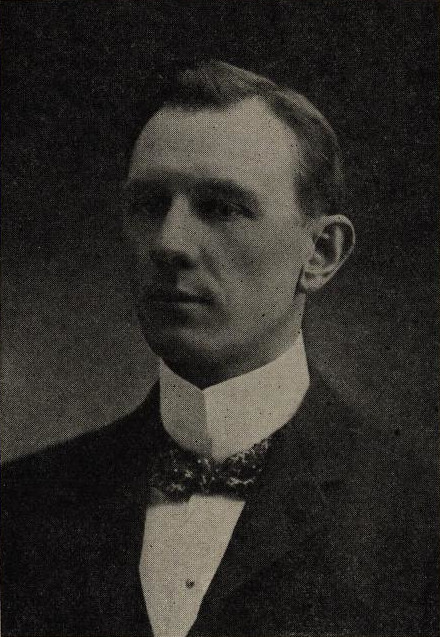

Quorum of the Twelve Apostles
- October 24, 1901 – January 23, 1918
- Called by: Joseph F. Smith

LDS Church Apostle
- October 24, 1901 – January 23, 1918
- Called by: Joseph F. Smith
- Reason: Death of Lorenzo Snow; reorganization of First Presidency
- Reorganization at end of term: Richard R. Lyman ordained

Personal details
- Born: Hyrum Mack Smith; March 21, 1872; Salt Lake City, Utah Territory, United States
- Died: January 23, 1918 (aged 45); Salt Lake City, Utah, United States
- Cause of death: ruptured appendix
- Resting place: Salt Lake City Cemetery; 40°46′37.92″N 111°51′28.8″W
- Spouse(s): Ida Elizabeth Bowman
- Children: 5
- Parents: Joseph F. Smith; Edna Lambson

Hyrum Mack Smith (March 21, 1872 – January 23, 1918) was a member of the Quorum of the Twelve Apostles of the Church of Jesus Christ of Latter-day Saints (LDS Church).

Smith was born in Salt Lake City, Utah Territory, the eldest son of church apostle and future church president Joseph F. Smith and Edna Lambson. Smith was named after his paternal grandfather Hyrum Smith, who was the elder brother of LDS Church founder Joseph Smith and a prominent leader of the early church.

Smith attended Latter-day Saint College, from which he graduated in 1894. On November 15, 1895, he married Ida Elizabeth Bowman and the next day left her behind in Utah to serve a mission in Great Britain. From October 1896 until February 1898, Smith presided over the Newcastle Conference.

After returning from his mission, Smith worked at ZCMI while also serving as a part-time missionary in Salt Lake City.

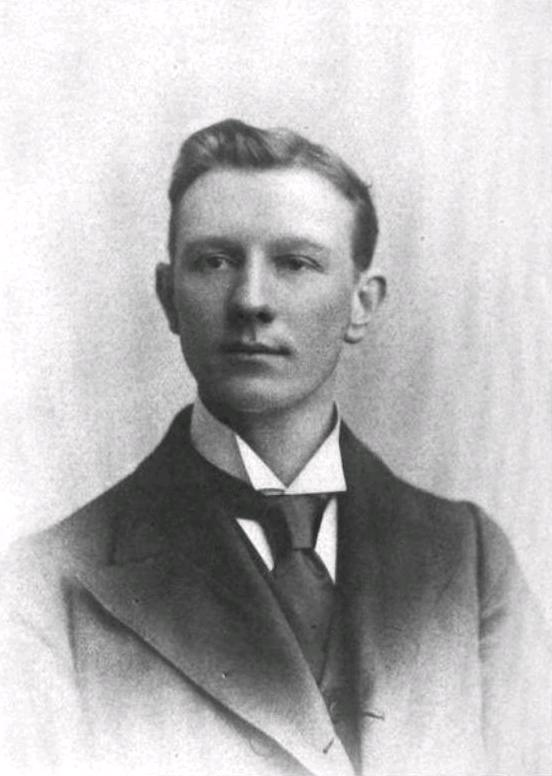
Smith in 1901 around the time of his call to the Quorum of the Twelve Apostles

Smith was ordained an apostle of the church on October 24, 1901, at the age of 29, by his father, who was president of the church. In 1909 Smith was assigned as one of the original two priesthood advisors to the Church wide Primary Association.

In 1913, Smith was called as the president of the European Mission of the church. He served in this capacity until 1916, when the activities of the mission were suspended due to World War I.

Smith and his wife had five children, one of whom was Joseph Fielding Smith, who became presiding patriarch of the church. Another of Smith's children was Geraldine Smith, the mother of M. Russell Ballard, an apostle of the LDS Church.

Smith wrote a commentary on the Doctrine and Covenants with Janne M. Sjödahl.

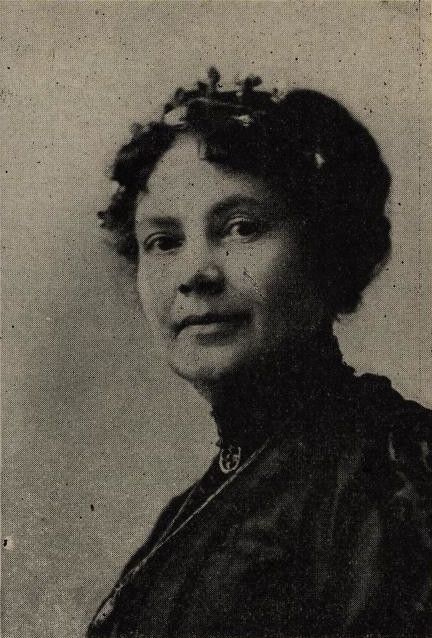
Smith's wife, Ida Bowman Smith, accompanied him to lead the church's European Mission. Both died in 1918 not long after their return.

Smith died in Salt Lake City from a ruptured appendix on January 23, 1918, at the age of 45. He was buried at Salt Lake City Cemetery. His wife Ida was pregnant with their fifth child, Hyrum, and died from complications with childbirth in September 1918. The deaths of Hyrum Mack and Ida were among the contributing factors that led to the revelation of Church President (and Hyrum's father) Joseph F. Smith in October 1918 on the spirits of the dead, which became section 138 of the Doctrine and Covenants.

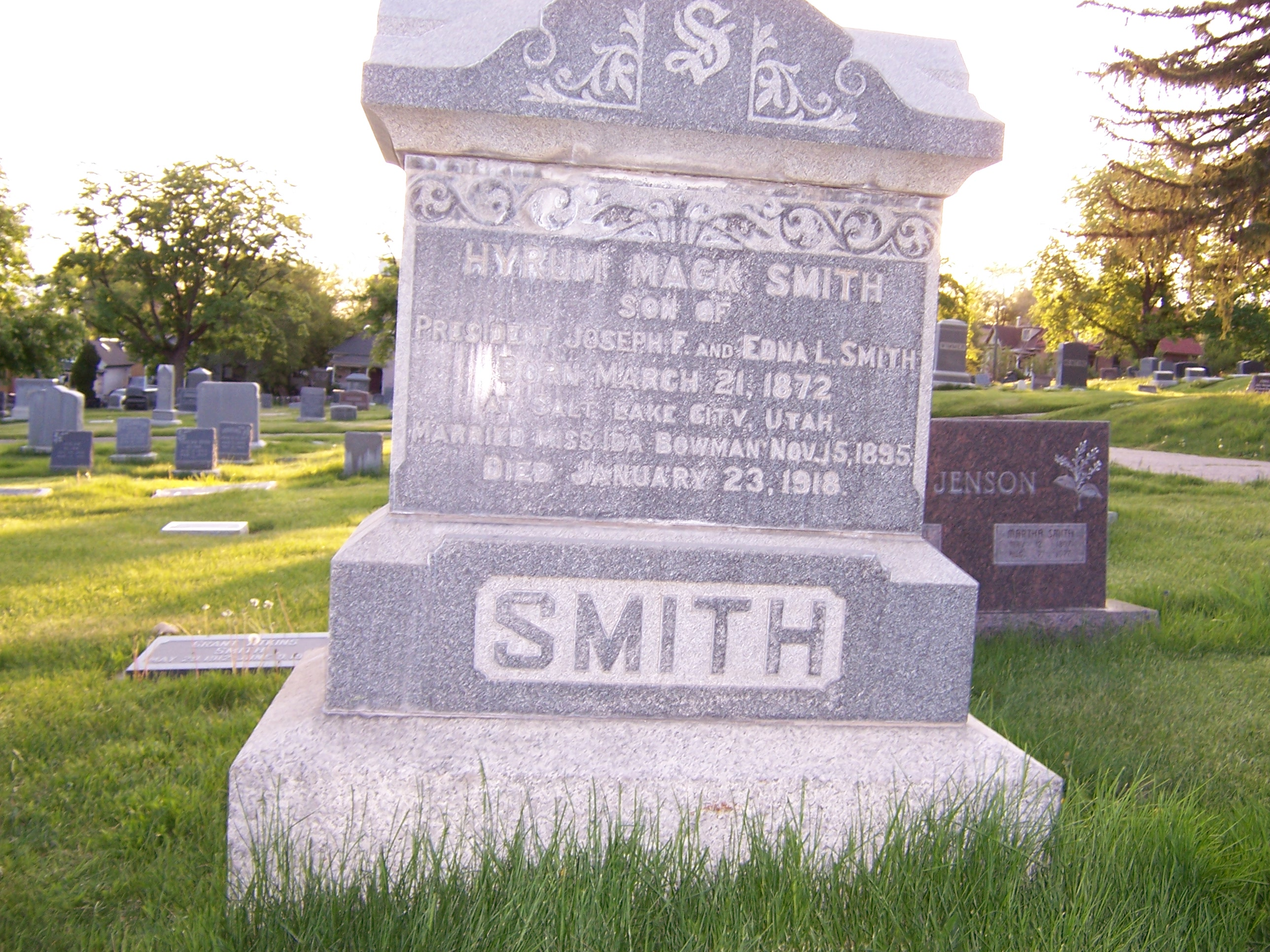
Grave marker of Hyrum M. Smith

The Church of Jesus Christ of Latter-day Saints titles
Preceded by Reed Smoot	Quorum of the Twelve Apostles; October 24, 1901 – January 23, 1918	Succeeded by George Albert Smith
