= List of Mormon missionary diarists (Asia and Middle East) =

This is part of the list of Mormon missionary diarists, covering diarists who served full-time missions in Asia and the Middle East.

Country	Name	Mission	Years served	Notes
India (Hindustan)	Skelton, Robert H.		1852–1856	
Japan	Ivie, Lloyd O.		1911–1914	
Japan	Lee, Lafayette Cox and A. Pearl Mortensen Lee		1915–1919	couple married in 1915, then called to serve mission together
Japan	Taylor, Alma O.		1901–1910	
Middle East	Booth, Joseph Wilford	Turkey; Armenia	1898–1902; 1903–1909; 1921–1928	
Thailand (Siam)	Savage Jr., Levi		1852–1855	called to Siam but was not allowed to enter country, preached in India and Burma
