= Mormon missionary diarists =

Mormon missionary diarists are the missionaries who kept records in the form of diaries and journals recounting their activities on behalf of the Church of Jesus Christ of Latter-day Saints (LDS Church) in various parts of the world. Both male and female missionaries kept these diaries and were encouraged to do so by the church. Many of these documents have been donated to the Brigham Young University's (BYU) Harold B. Lee Library (HBLL), and since 2003, a large selection of these have been transcribed and digitized.

== Personal diaries ==
Since the early days of the LDS Church, its leaders have encouraged the record-keeping of both individuals and as an organization. Personal record-keeping is considered to be a high priority, especially as an individual experiences "spiritual, cultural, social relationships, and personal growth". Because a mission is viewed as an "intensive spiritual experience, accompanied frequently by the gaining of new cultural and social insights", missionary journaling has been emphasized by the church throughout the years.

=== Digitizing the diaries ===
Many of the missionary diaries in this collection were saved as archives by the diarist's family and later donated to BYU's HBLL. In 2003, students and faculty began the five-year project to transcribe and digitize the diary collection, consisting of 115 missionary diarists and 376 written volumes. Criteria including readability, language, and content were established to determine which diaries would be most valuable to the collection. Most of the diarists featured in the collection never rose to great prominence. However, the mission diaries of church leaders such as Hyrum Smith, James E. Talmage, and Moses Thatcher are included. All diary pages were digitally prepped, scanned and uploaded online to create the collection. The digital images of the diary pages appear next to the transcription to make the information easy to read.

== See also ==
Lists of Mormon missionary diarists for the respective geographical area shown:

- Asia and Middle East
- Europe
- North America
- Pacific
