= List of Mormon missionary diarists (North America) =

This is part of the list of Mormon missionary diarists, covering diarists who served full-time missions in North America.

Country/Region	Name	Mission	Years served	Notes
Mexico	Thatcher, Moses		1879–1881	
Mexico	Young, Feramorz Little		1880–1881	
United States	Boyle, Henry Green	San Bernardino California; Southern States	1855–1857; 1867–1869	collection only has diaries from San Bernardino, Southern States missions, served missions continuously for rest of his life
United States	Jensen, Louis Reuben	Southern States	1898–1899	
United States	Butler, Alma	Northwestern States	1910–1912	
United States	Duffin, James Gledhill	Southern States	1887–1889	
United States	Elton, David Horton	Southern States	1898–1901	
United States	Fairbanks, John B.	Southern States	1881–1883	
United States	Flake, Osmer Dennis	Southern States	1897–1900	
United States	Fuller, Amos Bottsford	New York	1837; 1838	served two missions, completing each the year it began
United States	Gibbs, John Henry	Southern States	1883–1884	
United States	Hansen, Oscar Keilgaard	Northern States	1898–1900	
United States	Harper, John Claiborne	Southern States	1887–1888	
United States	Harris, Dennison Emer	West Central States	1880–1882	
United States	Haskell, Thales Hastings	Southern Indian	1859–1860	
United States	Hawley, Claude William	Central States	1910–1912	
United States	Heninger, Ellis Seymour	Southern States	1899–1901	
United States	Jacobs, Lyman Hinman	Northern States	1928–1929	
United States	Jensen, Nephi	Southern States	1898–1900	
United States	Kienke, Asa Solomon	Northern States	1896–1898	
United States	Lee, John Doyle	Tennessee	1840–1841	
United States	Miller, Reuben Gardner	Southern States	1888–1990	
United States	Nielsen, Charles Magnus	Northwestern States	1883–1884	
United States	Nielsen, Elias	Northern States	1897–1899	
United States	Nielson, Frihoff Godfrey	Northern States	1899–1901	
United States	Rappleye, William Edwin	Eastern States	1911–1913	
United States	Richards, Silas LeRoy	Middle States, Southern States	1902–1905	
United States	Robinson, William Oliver	Western States	1897–1899	
United States	Robison, Willis Eugene	Southern States	1882–1884	
United States	Smith, Albert Ricks	Southern States	1887–1889	
United States	Smith, Hyrum	Ohio	1832–1833	served many brief missions during this time period and beyond, diary only 1832–1833
United States	Smoot, Abraham Owen	Southern States	1837–1838; 1844–1845	
United States	Sowards, Harmon Silas	Eastern States	1911–1913	
United States	Taylor, Levi James	Southern States	1882–1884	
United States	Webster, George Thomas	Southern States	1896–1898	
United States	Jensen, Winston McKay	Central States	1956–1958	
