= List of Mormon missionary diarists (Pacific) =

This is part of the list of Mormon missionary diarists, covering diarists who served full-time missions in the Pacific.

Country/Region	Name	Mission	Years served	Notes
New Zealand	Erekson, William Benbow	Bay of Islands District, Auckland District	1899–1902	
New Zealand	Greenwood, Alma	Auckland District, Wellington District	1882–1884	
New Zealand	Kirkham, Francis Washington	Waikato District	1896–1899	
New Zealand	Markham, Joseph	Bay of Islands District	1892–1897	
New Zealand	Ottley, Sidney James	Hawkes Bay District; New Zealand Mission	1912–1916; 1951–1955	served as mission president (1951–1955)
New Zealand	Reeve, Emma Elizabeth		1902–1904	
New Zealand	Scott, Rouzelle Eugene		1893–1896	
New Zealand	Taylor, George Shepherd		1884–1888; 1920–1924	served as mission president (1920–1924)
New Zealand	Tonks, Warren	Manawatu Conference, Hauraki Conference	1902–1904	
New Zealand	Wright, Alexander Walter	Hawke's Bay District	1920–1923	
Samoa	Bennett, Jesse John	Tutuila, Aunuu	1889–1892	
Samoa	Carpenter, Joseph Hatten	Tutuila, Aunuu	1890–1893	
Samoa, Tonga	Jones, Albert Stephen		1894–1896	
Samoa	Ogden, William Thomas		1898–1901	
Samoa	Olsen, Abinadi	Tutuila, Aunuu	1895–1898	
Samoa	Paul, Earl Stanley	Upolu, Tutuila	1912–1916	
Samoa	Smart, Edwin Hezekiah	Upolu	1897–1901	
Samoa, Tonga	Smith, Jennie Hill Leavitt	Tutuila	1915–1920	
Samoa, Tonga	Smith, Willard Libson	Tutuila	1915–1920	
Sandwich Islands (Hawaii)	Cluff, Benjamin	Molokai	1878–1882	
Sandwich Islands (Hawaii)	Farrer, William		1850–1854	
Sandwich Islands (Hawaii)	Fifield, Edwin W.		1896–1899	
Sandwich Islands (Hawaii)	Giles, John Thomas	Laie	1890–1893; 1906–1907	
Sandwich Islands (Hawaii)	Green, Ephraim	Molokai	1852–1855	
Sandwich Islands (Hawaii)	Hammond, Mary Jane Dilworth	Lahaina	1851–1856	
Sandwich Islands (Hawaii)	Johnson, Brigham		1889–1892	
Sandwich Islands (Hawaii)	Moss, Henry	Kauai	1894–1898	
Sandwich Islands (Hawaii)	Murphy, Castle	Kauai	1909–1913	
Sandwich Islands (Hawaii)	Woodbury, John Stillman		1851–1857	
Sandwich Islands (Hawaii)	Young, John Ray	Molokai	1856–1857	
Society Islands (French Polynesia)	Cannon, Eugene Mousley	Tahiti	1893–1896	
