= Inez Knight Allen =

American Mormon missionary and politician (1876–1937)

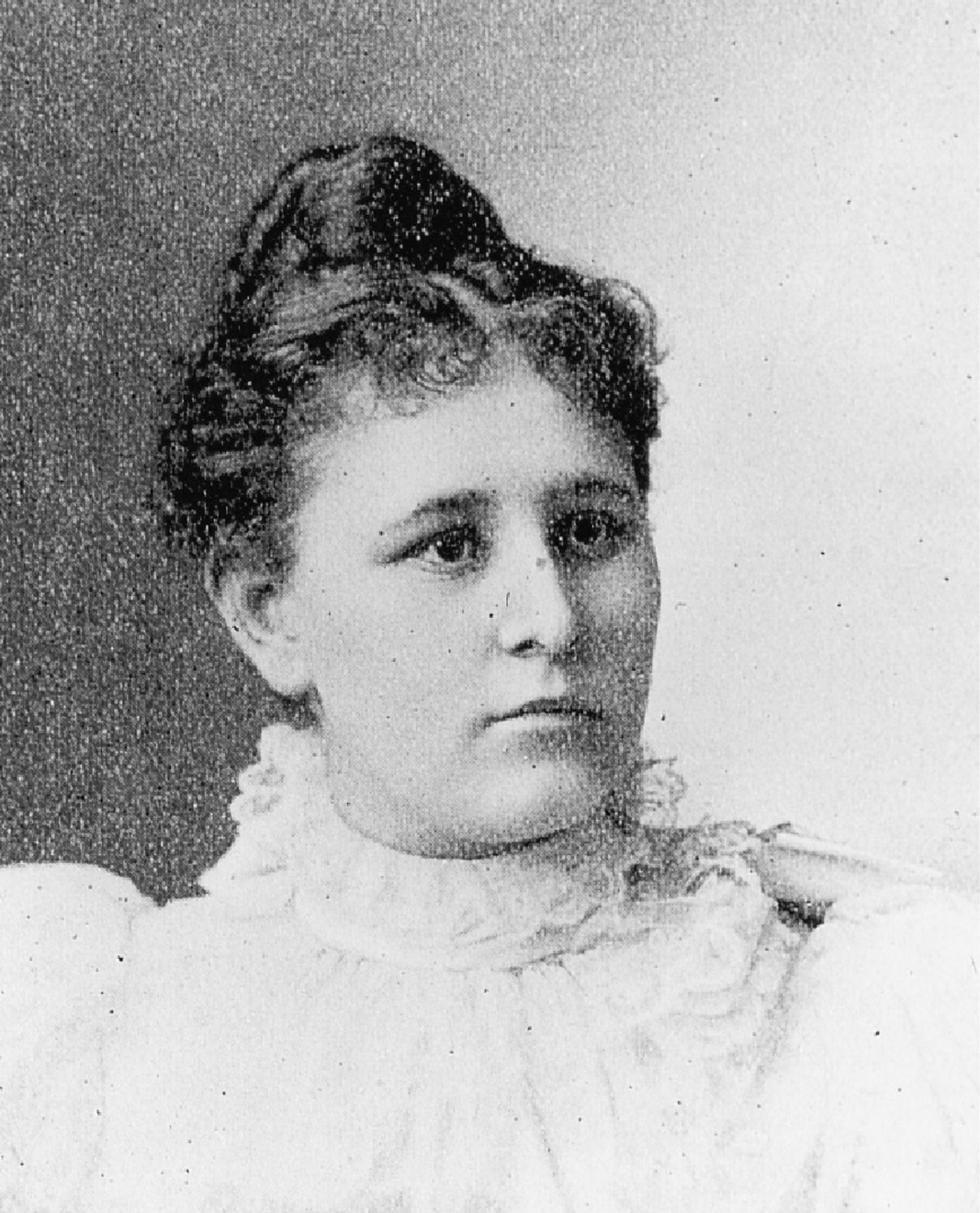

Personal details
- Born: September 8, 1876; Payson, Utah Territory, United States
- Died: June 5, 1937 (aged 60); Provo, Utah, United States
- Resting place: Provo City Cemetery
- Known For: Being the first single woman LDS missionary; Appointment as Brigham Young Academy matron (1900–1902); Election as a member of the Women's National Democratic Committee (1928); Calling as member of Relief Society general board
- Alma mater: Brigham Young Academy
- Spouse(s): Robert Eugene Allen
- Children: 5
- Parents: Jesse Knight; Amanda McEwan Knight
- Signature

Amanda Inez Knight Allen (September 8, 1876 – June 5, 1937) was an American Mormon missionary and politician. In 1898, she became one of the first two single women to be missionaries for the Church of Jesus Christ of Latter-day Saints (LDS Church).

Amanda Inez Knight was born near Payson, Utah Territory, to Jesse Knight and his wife Amanda McEwan. She was born the fourth of five children; her siblings included brothers Raymond and J. Will Knight and sisters Jennie Knight Mangum and Ione Knight Jordan. The family moved to Provo and Inez Knight enrolled in Brigham Young Academy (BYA). By the age of 22, Knight had completed her studies at BYA and had moved to St. George, Utah, where she was involved in family genealogical research.

== Missionary service in Great Britain ==
On April 1, 1898, Knight was set apart as one of the first two single women in the LDS Church to be formally selected as full-time church missionaries. The other was her childhood friend Jennie Brimhall. Jennie Brimhall and Inez Knight were missionary companions in England for a year, leaving Provo on April 2 arriving in England on April 28, 1898. As missionaries, Knight and Brimhall were frequently asked to speak at public meetings and distribute missionary tracts on the street. Because Knight and Brimhall were the first, and for a time only, lady missionaries serving Europe, they were often asked to travel throughout England to speak. In a letter to the Deseret Evening News, missionary Joseph S. Broadbent wrote that "Sisters Jennie Brimhall and Inez Knight, both of Provo, Utah, each spoke at some length on Utah and her people and bore strong testimonies on the restoration of the Gospel and the divine mission of Joseph Smith. There were about 800 people present and a pin could be heard drop."

Knight and Brimhall not only traveled extensively in England, but throughout other parts of Europe as well. Knight reported having spent "a month visiting the principal cities of France, Switzerland, Germany, Belgium, and Holland. Knight believed that one of her main purposes as a missionary was to dispel the belief, common throughout Europe, that Mormon women "were downtrodden slaves". Knight and the other missionaries were not always welcome, however. In February 1899, Knight was in attendance at a church meeting in Bristol when all of the windows were broken by anti-Mormon rioters. Knight, her companion, and the other missionaries had to seek protection from the local police. Although Jennie Brimhall returned to Utah in November 1898 due to poor health, Knight continued her mission until 1900 with several other companions, including Liza Chipman and J. Clara Holbrook, both from Utah. Due to the scarcity of lady missionaries, however, at times Knight served alone. She recorded in her journal one meeting in which "I was the only girl. I felt more conspicuous by the elders beginning their remarks; my brethren and sister." Areas in which Knight served included Cheltenham, London, Kent, and Bristol. Knight returned home from Britain in June 1900, after over two years service throughout Britain, Scotland, and Wales.

== Political work ==
Allen was also active in the Democratic Party in Utah, serving on various committees and in different offices as early as 1895 at the age of 19 years old. She was named a member of the executive committee of Governor George Dern's advisory council for unemployment relief in 1931. She served four years as a Democratic national committeewoman, during which time she attended two national conventions, one in New York in 1924 and the other in Houston, Texas in 1928. She once ran as a Democratic candidate for State Senate, and was endorsed by William Jennings Bryan and Heber J. Grant for the position. At times, Allen's political beliefs and religious views clashed. As a national committeewoman for the Democratic party, Inez Allen was a supporter of 1932 Democratic candidate Franklin D. Roosevelt. However, Allen opposed the repeal of the 18th Amendment, one of Roosevelt's platform planks. In 1924, Allen was a Utah delegate to the Democratic National Convention in Cleveland, Ohio. Because her husband was a Republican, Allen's political experiences were sometimes unique. For example, in 1924, Allen attended both the Democratic and Republican National Conventions, the first she attended as a Democratic national committeewoman, the second she attended with her husband, who was acting as a delegate from Utah. Additionally, Allen was elected to the National Women's Democratic Committee in 1928. Allen was frequently recognized and honored for her political efforts, and was named Utah's "Goddess of Liberty" at the 1898 or 1900 Provo Fourth of July Celebration.

== Personal life ==
In June 1902, Knight married Robert Eugene Allen, a prominent local banker and community developer, in the Salt Lake City temple. Robert Allen was born on December 21, 1877, in Coalville, Utah, to Mr. and Mrs. Thomas L. Allen. Mr. Allen served an LDS mission in Liverpool, England, in 1905, and attended the Brigham Young Academy where he met Knight. They had five sons, including W. Eugene J. Knight, Robert K. Allen, Joseph Knight Allen, and Mark E. Allen.

After her marriage, Inez Allen was active in various areas within the church and the community. From 1927 until her death (10 years) she was a member of the Relief Society's general board. Allen was also extensively involved with Brigham Young Academy for several years following her mission to Great Britain. In 1900, just a few months after returning home, Allen was named matron for "Missionary Theology for Girls" of the academy. Allen was the matron of the school for two years despite personal setbacks, which included falling ill with smallpox in October 1900. Allen helped initiate the community welfare department in Provo and was active in the Red Cross organization of Utah County.

Allen was frequently honored for her role as one of the first two single female missionaries for the LDS church. In 1934 she and Jennie Brimhall Knight were honored by Church President Heber J. Grant at a meeting of the Yesharah Society. In addition to her leadership in the Relief Society and membership in the Yesharah Society, Allen participated in various other activities and clubs, including the Nelke Reading Club.

In 1937, Allen died unexpectedly in her home in Provo, Utah, of gastritis. Her funeral was held June 9, 1937, and speakers included Dr. Franklin S. Harris, then President of BYU, and Stephen L. Richards of the Quorum of the Twelve Apostles (LDS Church). The funeral was large, with members of the Yesharah Society, Relief Society General Board, and faculty of BYU in attendance. She is buried at the Provo City Cemetery.

== Legacy ==
Inez Allen and her husband passed on a legacy of participation in local, state, and national politics to their children. Robert K. Allen served nationally as a U.S. Treasury agent from 1934 to 1945, working both in the United States and at the U.S. Embassy in Paris. He served locally as well, running for Provo City Council in 1961 and for mayor of Provo in 1965. Both Mrs. and Mr. Allen donated generous amounts of money to Brigham Young Academy. Inez Allen began donating as early as 1897. A year before her mission, she donated $10,000 to the institution, the only woman among the ten significant donors that year. As a donor, Allen was asked to give a speech at the 1897 ground-breaking ceremony of the new college building, again being the only woman invited to do so. A men's dormitory hall was named in honor of Mr. and Mrs. Knight in 1937.

== Publications ==
- "Conference Addresses". Relief Society Magazine. 15 (1): 22–24. January 1928.
- "Jennie Brimhall Knight". Relief Society Magazine. 15 (12): 646–688. December 1928.
- "Relief Society Conference: Saturday Afternoon". Relief Society Magazine. 7 (6): 353–358. June 1920.
