= Alice Louise Reynolds =

American academic (1873–1938)

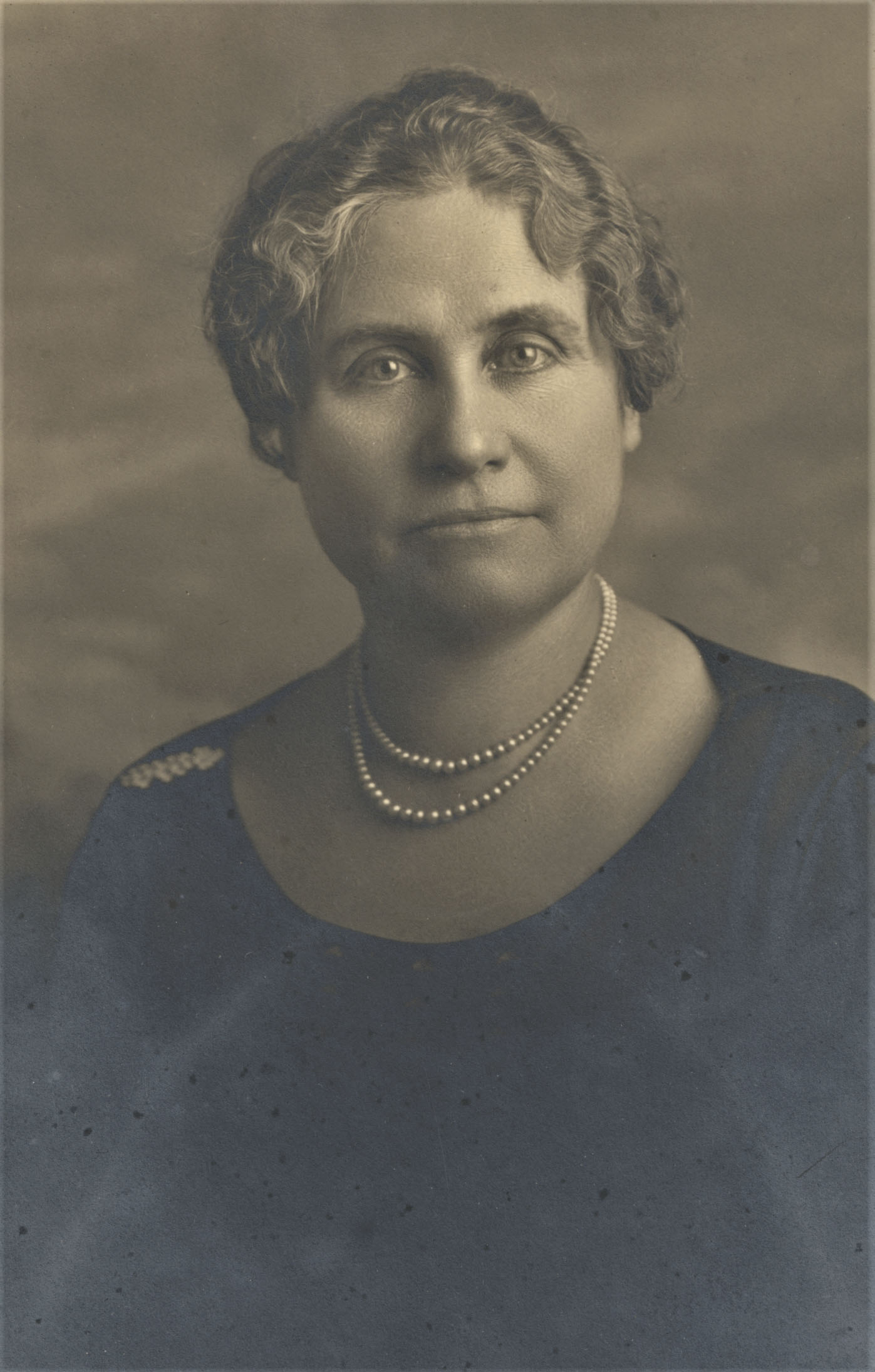

Personal details
- Born: April 1, 1873; Salt Lake City, Utah Territory, United States
- Died: December 5, 1938 (aged 65); Salt Lake City, Utah, United States
- Cause of death: cancer
- Resting place: Salt Lake City Cemetery; 40.777°N 111.858°W
- Alma mater: University of Michigan; Brigham Young Academy
- Notable works: Relief Society Magazine editor
- Parents: George Reynolds; Mary A. T. Reynolds

Alice Louise Reynolds (April 1, 1873 – December 5, 1938) was a Brigham Young University (BYU) professor. Reynolds furthered her studies out east, receiving a bachelor's degree from the University of Michigan. She taught college-level courses at Brigham Young Academy until it dissolved into BYU, and she was the first woman to do so. She was the second woman in Utah to be named a full professor, and the first woman to be a full professor at BYU. She worked to establish the library at Brigham Young Academy, and through her efforts, she was able to collect over 100,000 donated volumes. She worked as an editor for the Relief Society Magazine and contributed to other Church of Jesus Christ of Latter-day Saints-affiliated magazines. Reynolds was an outspoken Democrat and served on the party's committee and as a delegate to the party's national convention. Reynolds died in 1938 of cancer.

== Childhood and education ==
Reynolds was born in Salt Lake City, Utah Territory, United States, to George Reynolds and Mary Ann Tuddenham. Her father, George Reynolds, was a Seventy in the Church of Jesus Christ of Latter-day Saints (LDS Church), a longtime secretary to the First Presidency of the church, and manager of the Salt Lake Theatre. When Alice was six years old, George was incarcerated for two years because he practiced plural marriage.

At the age of four she attended a private school taught by Izzie Calder, daughter of David O. Calder. George's sister Julia Reynolds helped look after Alice during her childhood. Alice enjoyed reading and the company of other grownups. At age 12, Alice's mother died in childbirth. Her teacher at the Twentieth Ward school, T. B. Lewis, left to become the principal of Ogden High School. The combination of these two events led George to send Alice and her younger sister Florence to the Brigham Young Academy (BYA) for high school, after short stints at Salt Lake Academy and Brigham Young College in Logan, Utah. She was greatly motivated by the teachings of one of her instructors, Academy Principal Karl G. Maeser. She graduated from BYA in 1890.

After teaching for two years, the president of BYA, Benjamin Cluff, suggested that she establish a literature department at BYA after furthering her studies. At age 17, she was financially independent, and took out loans to continue her studies in literature at the University of Michigan from 1892 to 1894. During that time, she closely associated with Richard R. Lyman and Joseph F. Merrill the later of whom was her branch president. In 1894, she received the promised faculty appointment at BYA.

She received a Bachelor of Pedagogy degree in 1895, followed by a Bachelor of Didactics from the Church Board of Education in 1897 and a Bachelor of Arts degree from BYU in 1910. She later pursued advanced study at Chicago, Cornell, Berkeley and Columbia, and made four trips to Europe in 1906, 1910, 1924, and 1937.

== Career ==
=== Teaching ===
Alice Reynolds's faculty photo from 1914

Reynolds began her teaching career after graduating from BYA. She taught for a year at the Salt Lake 14th Ward Seminary and at Juab Stake Academy. She was 21 when she accepted a position at BYA.

Reynolds was a Professor of English from 1894 to 1938. She was the first woman at BYA to teach college-level classes. She taught literature there until 1903 when the school was replaced by Brigham Young High School and BYU. She became the first woman to be a full professor at BYU. She taught approximately 5,000 students in 20 different English courses. Reynolds was known for her absent-mindedness at BYU. According to her students, she once walked through a herd of cows while reading a book and brought a teakettle to work instead of her purse. Despite her reputation for absent-mindedness, Reynolds exuded confidence and self-respect.

Reynolds was an editor for the Relief Society Magazine from 1923 to 1930. She also wrote for the Young Woman's Journal, the Improvement Era, and The Instructor. Reynolds was also called to the General Board of the Relief Society of The LDS Church in 1923. She served for seven years.

=== Contributions to library ===
At BYA, Reynolds served as a member of a faculty committee to establish the library. The committee formed in 1906, and Reynolds served as its chairperson for 19 years. Part of her work on the committee included a large fundraiser to obtain 1,200 books to add to the school's library. Over the course of her life, she organized several other campaigns to help the library grow to 100,000 volumes. On February 19, 1933, the Alice Louise Reynolds Club was formally established with a written constitution and by-laws established by a central committee. Through the efforts of the club, over 10,000 volumes were donated to the BYU library.

=== Involvement in politics ===
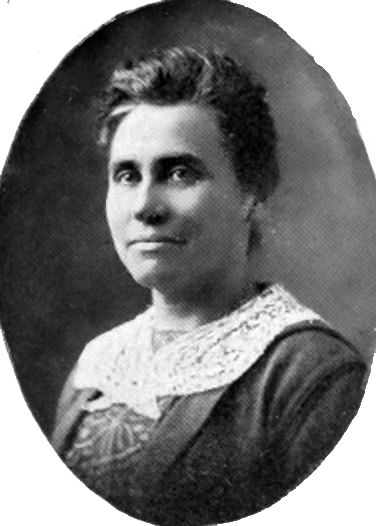
Alice Louise Reynolds in 1920

In politics, Reynolds was an active Democrat, serving on the national party's committee and as a delegate to the party's national convention. She was a delegate to the General Federation of Women's Clubs, the National American Women Suffrage Conventions, and the League of Women Voters at the Pan American Convention. At the General Federation of Women's Clubs, in response to accusations that The LDS Church dictated how members must vote, Reynolds stated that her religion did not interfere with her voting as a Democrat. In 1920, as a delegate to the National Democratic Convention, she made a speech seconding the nomination for William Gibbs McAdoo for President.

Reynolds died of cancer at the age of 65.

== Legacy ==
The auditorium in the Harold B. Lee Library is named after Reynolds. In the mid-20th century several cities in Utah, including St. George, had women's literary clubs named after Reynolds.

Starting in 1978, women in Provo revived the Alice Louise Reynolds club in the form of the Alice Louise Reynolds forum, which discussed issues related to Mormon feminism, including their support for the Equal Rights Amendment. In 1984, they changed their name to the Algie Eggertsen Ballif forum.

== Publications ==
=== Articles ===
- "Francis Marion Lyman". Relief Society Magazine. 4 (2): 65–67. February 1917.
- "Admiral George Dewey and Homer Davenport". Relief Society Magazine. 4 (3): 147–148. March 1917.
- "Two Favorite Hymns". Relief Society Magazine. 10 (3): 128–130. March 1923.
- "Relief Society Conference Address". Relief Society Magazine. 10 (6): 293. June 1923.
- "Relief Society Conference Address". Relief Society Magazine. 10 (6): 293. June 1923.
- "The Book of Mormon Tested". Relief Society Magazine. 10 (9): 426–429. September 1923.
- "The Canada Temple". Relief Society Magazine. 10 (10): 478–479. October 1923.
- "Mrs. Harriet Perry Whiting". Relief Society Magazine. 10 (10): 497–499. October 1923.
- "Unveiling of President Williams' Portrait". Relief Society Magazine. 11 (7): 329. July 1924.
- "Mrs. Mabel Walker Willebrandt". Relief Society Magazine. 11 (10): 507–510. October 1924.
- "George Bernard Shaw". Relief Society Magazine. 13 (1): 28–30. January 1926.
- "Conference Address". Relief Society Magazine. 13 (7): 380–381. July 1926.
- "Susan West Smith". Relief Society Magazine. 13 (12): 609–611. December 1926.
- "Mrs. Kate Montgomery Barker". Relief Society Magazine. 16 (5): 239–241. May 1929.
- "Our Gallery of Portraits". Relief Society Magazine. 17 (4): 195–197. April 1930.
- "Tributes to Clarissa Smith Williams". Relief Society Magazine. 17 (5): 228–229. May 1930.
- "Relief Society Conference: Organization and Development of the Church of Jesus Christ of Latter-day". Relief Society Magazine. 17 (6): 315–319. June 1930.
- "Women in Modern Education". Relief Society Magazine. 17 (11): 611–612. November 1930.
- "Dr. Joseph Francis Merrill". Relief Society Magazine. 18 (11): 603–605. November 1931.

=== The Editor Abroad ===
- "The Editor Abroad: The Land of Scott and Burns". Relief Society Magazine. 12 (2): 54–62. February 1925.
- "The Editor Abroad: The Land of Scott and Burns". Relief Society Magazine. 12 (3): 130–135. March 1925.
- "The Editor Abroad: The Land of Scott and Burns: Edinburgh and Abbottsford". Relief Society Magazine. 12 (4): 183–188. April 1925.
- "The Editor Abroad: From Great Britain to France: A Visit to Chateau-Tierry, and the Place of the Arm". Relief Society Magazine. 12 (5): 250–255. May 1925.
- "The Editor Abroad: Something More about France and Something about Italy". Relief Society Magazine. 12 (7): 365–371. July 1925.
- "The Editor Abroad: Italy". Relief Society Magazine. 12 (8): 418–421. August 1925.
- "The Editor Abroad: More About Italy". Relief Society Magazine. 12 (9): 476–480. September 1925.
- "The Editor Abroad: The City of Rome and the Jubilee Years". Relief Society Magazine. 12 (10): 509–516. October 1925.
- "The Editor Abroad: Egypt". Relief Society Magazine. 12 (11): 564–573. November 1925.
- "The Editor Abroad: Palestine". Relief Society Magazine. 12 (12): 620–627. December 1925.

Relief Society Magazine titles
Preceded by Susa Young Gates	Editor; 1923–1930	Succeeded by Mary Connelly Kimball
