= ComeUntoChrist.org =

Website maintained by the Latter-Day Saints Church

churchofjesuschrist.org
- Website type: Religious website
- Available in: 35 languages
- Owner: The Church of Jesus Christ of Latter-day Saints
- Website: comeuntochrist.org
- Launched: 2001; 25 years ago
- Current status: Online

ComeUntoChrist.org, formerly known as Mormon.org, is a religious website maintained by the Church of Jesus Christ of Latter-day Saints (LDS Church) that serves as a visitor site for people who are not members of the church. Mormon.org was changed to ComeUntoChrist.org in 2019.

== History ==
The first LDS Church website was LDSchurchnews.com in 1995 followed later by the official LDS Church website LDS.org in December 1996. In 2001, Mormon.org was launched to "allow visitors to receive answers to their questions about the Church‘s beliefs". In 2010, the LDS Church launched an update to Mormon.org that they called 'Mormon.org 4.0' that included new tools to create profiles for "explaining why they live their faith and why they are a Mormon". This website updated coincided with multimillion-dollar television, billboard and Internet advertising campaign, called I'm a Mormon, that launched in 2010.

On October 7, 2018, Russell M. Nelson directed the church in a general conference address to replace the terms "Mormon" and "LDS" with the official name of the church. As a result, Mormon.org was transitioned to ComeUntoChrist.org on March 5, 2019. Similarly, the domain for the LDS Church's main website changed from LDS.org to ChurchofJesusChrist.org at the same time. The LDS Church's First Presidency explained that the change is a "complex effort in numerous global languages and much work remains. We encourage all to be patient and courteous as we work together to use and share the proper name of the church." It was also announced that ComeUntoChrist.org will eventually be merged with the member-focused ChurchofJesusChrist.org at some future date.
