= Mormon missionary =

Missionary of the LDS church

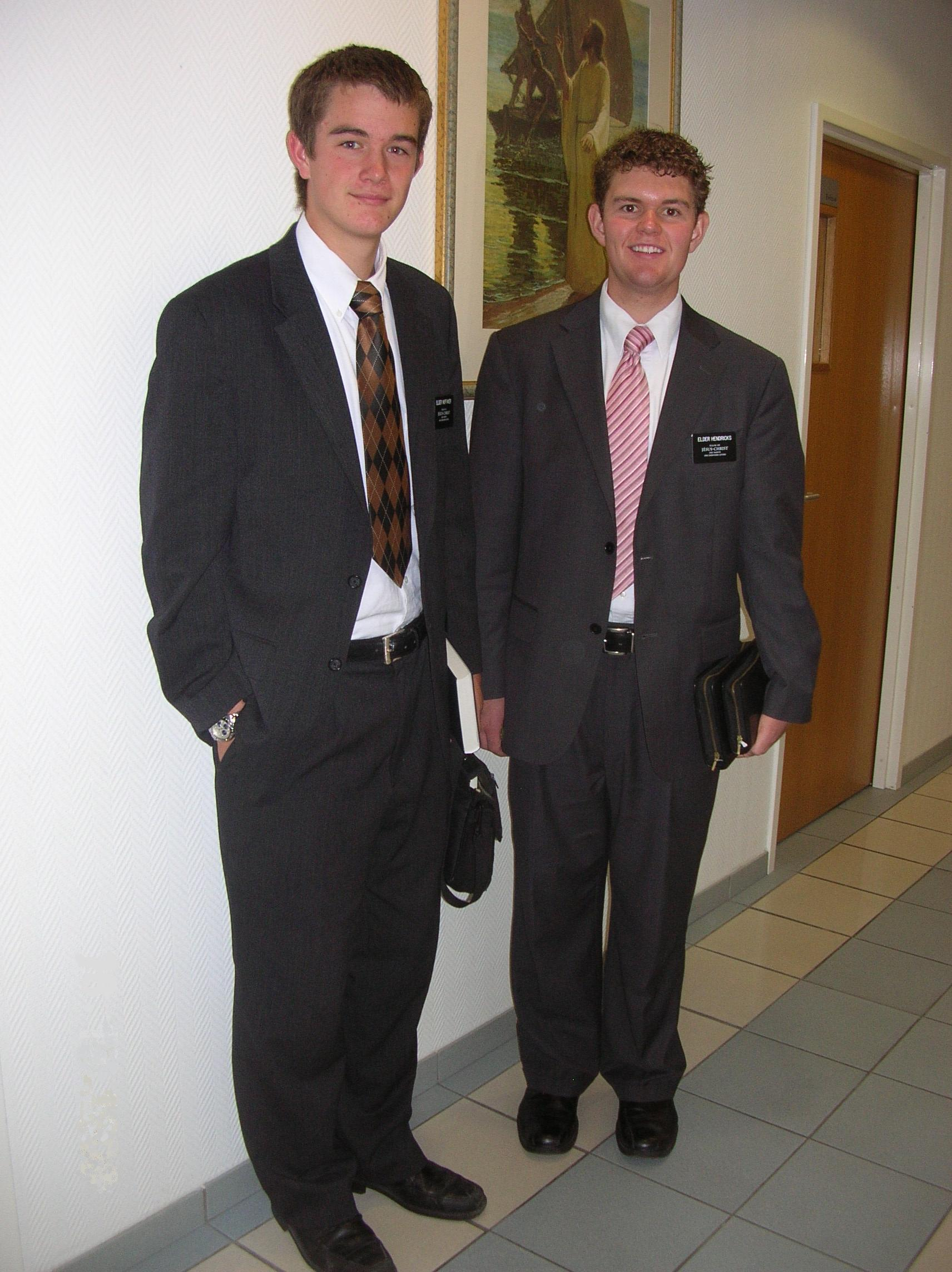
Two Mormon missionaries

Missionaries of the Church of Jesus Christ of Latter-day Saints (LDS Church), often referred to as Mormon missionaries, are volunteer representatives of the church who engage in proselytizing, church service, humanitarian aid, and community service. Missionaries of the church may be male (Elder missionaries) or female (Sister missionaries) and may serve on a full- or part-time basis, depending on the assignment. Missionaries are organized geographically into missions, which could be any one of the 449 organized worldwide. This is one of the practices that the LDS Church is well known for.

The LDS Church is one of the most active modern practitioners of missionary work, reporting that it had 90,000 full-time missionaries worldwide in 2026. Most of the church's full-time missionaries are single young men and women in their late teens and early twenties. Older couples no longer with children in their home also serve. Missionaries are often assigned to serve far from their homes, including in other countries. Many missionaries learn a new language at the Missionary Training Center (MTC) as part of their assignment. Missions typically last two years for males, 18 months for females, and one to three years for older couples. The LDS Church strongly encourages, but does not require, missionary service for young men. All these missionaries serve voluntarily and do not receive a salary for their work; they typically finance missions themselves or with assistance from family or other church members. Many Latter-day Saints save money during their teenage years to cover their mission expenses.

In 2007, the church said that, throughout its history, over one million church members have been sent on missions.

== Preparation to serve ==
=== Significance and basic qualifications ===
Completing a mission is often described as a rite of passage for a young Latter-day Saint. However, serving a mission is not necessary for continuance in church membership.

Young men between the ages of 18 and 25 who meet standards of worthiness are strongly encouraged to consider a two-year, full-time proselytizing mission. This expectation is based in part on the New Testament passage "Go ye therefore, and teach all nations" (Matthew 28:19–20, KJV). The minimum age had previously been age 19 in most countries until October 6, 2012, when church president Thomas S. Monson announced that all male missionaries, regardless of nation, could serve from age 18. Prior to the announcement, members from some countries were allowed to serve from the younger age to avoid conflict with educational or military requirements. It was also announced that young women may serve beginning at age 19 instead of 21, although it remained the position that no young person "should begin his or her service as a missionary before they are ready". This was changed in 2025 however, with the minimum age for young women to serve now being 18 as well. In 2007, approximately 30% of all 19-year-old Latter-day Saint men became missionaries. From Latter-day Saint families that are active in the church, approximately 80–90% of 19-year-old men serve a mission.

Missionaries can be sent home for violating mission rules, and occasionally they choose to go home for health or various other reasons.

As of 2007, 80% of all missionaries were young single men, 13% were young single women, and 7% retired couples. Women who want to serve a mission must meet the same standards of worthiness as men and be at least 18 years old. Women generally serve as missionaries for 18 months. Married retired couples are encouraged to serve missions, but their length of service may vary from six to 36 months depending on their circumstances and means. Any single retired person may also be called to serve in what is known as senior missionary service. In the last two decades, the LDS Church has stepped up its call for senior couple missionaries.

=== Standards of worthiness ===
All missionaries must meet certain minimum standards of worthiness. Among the standards that a prospective missionary must demonstrate adherence to are: attendance at church meetings, personal prayer, study of the scriptures, adherence to the law of chastity (sexual purity), adherence to the word of wisdom (code of health and nutrition), payment of tithing, spiritual diligence, and a testimony of God.

=== Other exclusionary factors ===
In addition to spiritual preparedness, church bishops are instructed to ensure that prospective missionaries are physically, mentally, and emotionally capable of full-time missionary work. In the same speech where he called for "every young man" to fill a mission, church president Spencer W. Kimball added, "we realize that while all men definitely should, all men are not prepared to teach the gospel abroad". Apart from general issues of worthiness and ability, there are a number of specific situations that will disqualify a person from becoming an LDS Church full-time missionary. Those excluded include those who would have to leave dependent children in the care of someone else; young couples who are still of childbearing age; those who are in debt and have not made arrangements to meet these obligations; those who are on legal probation or parole; couples with serious unresolved marital problems; those who are HIV-positive; and those who have been convicted of sexual abuse. Additionally, members who have submitted to, performed, encouraged, paid for, or arranged for an abortion (except in the case of rape, incest, or when the mother's life is in danger) are usually excluded from missionary service, as are members who have fathered or borne a child out of wedlock; men under 26 and women under 40 who have been divorced; and anyone who has participated in homosexual activity after age 16.

From the beginnings of the LDS Church, people of black African descent could become members of the church. Up until 1978, it was not common for men of black African descent to serve on missions, most likely due to the ban on black people holding the priesthood. However, some black men such as Elijah Abel did hold the priesthood and served multiple missions in their lifetime. This priesthood ban was lifted in 1978 during Kimball's presidency, and since then there have been no restrictions to missionary service based on race or ethnicity.

=== Mission call ===
After application to the church and the requisite approval, prospective missionaries receive a "call to serve"—an official notification of their location assignment—from the church's president. The mission call also informs the prospective missionary what language he or she will be expected to use during their mission. Members of the Quorum of the Twelve Apostles are responsible for assigning missionaries to a particular mission. A prospective missionary receiving the call to serve is generally considered to be a major event in church culture; family members, friends, and members of the prospective missionary's congregation often gather together when a call arrives, which the prospective missionary opens and reads aloud to the group.

Until 2018, mission calls were mailed to prospective missionaries. In the summer of 2018, the church announced they would begin emailing mission calls to prospective missionaries. The church began emailing calls to prospective missionaries residing in Utah and Idaho in the summer of 2018, with the goal of expanding to the rest of the United States and all countries with reliable internet by the beginning of 2019.

=== Temple attendance ===
Before beginning their mission, prospective male missionaries are usually ordained to the office of an elder in the Melchizedek Priesthood (if they do not hold this office already). All missionaries are set apart by the laying on of hands to preach the gospel; this is usually performed by the missionary's stake president. Prospective missionaries also usually attend the temple for the first time to receive their endowment if they have not already done so.

=== Training ===
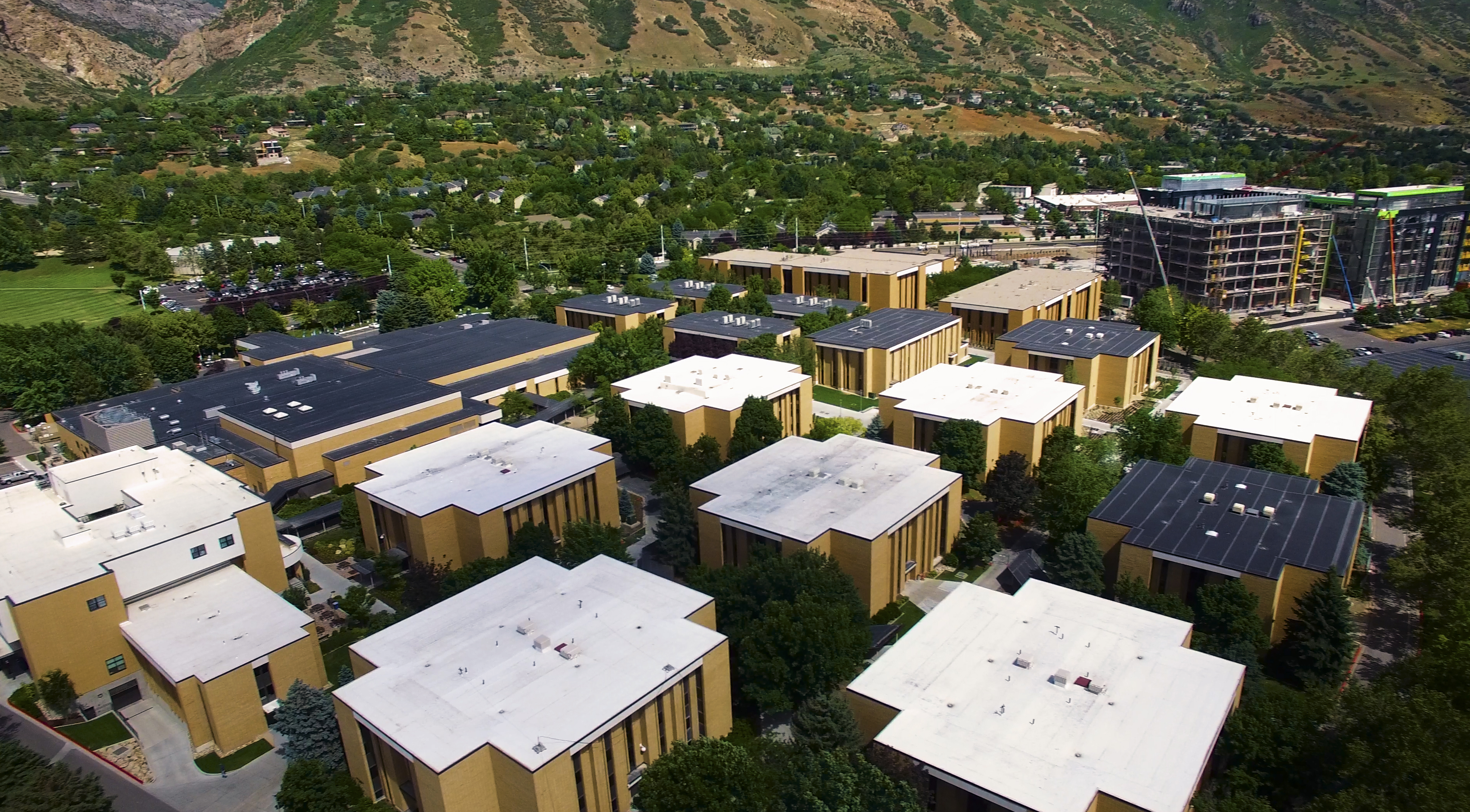
The Missionary Training Center in Provo, Utah, United States, is one of 11 such centers located throughout the world.

Newly called missionaries attend a short training period at one of the church's 11 MTCs worldwide. The largest MTC is located in Provo, Utah, adjacent to Brigham Young University. Missionaries who will not be learning a language in order to serve their missions spend three weeks at an MTC where they practice using proselytizing materials, learn expected conduct, and study the scriptures. Missionaries bound for foreign-language missions spend six to nine weeks at an MTC, depending on the language to be learned. During this period, they are encouraged not to speak in their native tongue but rather to immerse themselves in the new language.

== Missionary conduct ==
=== Missionary Handbook ===
The basic standards of missionary service and conduct were previously contained in the Missionary Handbook. The previous Missionary Handbook was commonly and informally referred to as "the white handbook" or "the white bible". As of November 2019, this handbook has been replaced by two new handbooks, Missionary Standards for Disciples of Jesus Christ and Missionary Standards for Disciples of Jesus Christ: Supplemental Information. Missionaries are instructed that following these standards will protect them both physically and spiritually. Mission presidents have discretion to adjust some of the standards according to local circumstances.

=== Dress and grooming ===
Full-time LDS Church missionaries are required to adhere to a dress code. Previously for men, this included conservative, dark trousers and suit coats, white dress shirts, and conservative ties. For women, modest and professional dresses or blouses and mid-calf length skirts were worn.

In 2013, the LDS Church updated their grooming standards. Young men were no longer required to wear dark suits or a full suit during regular everyday proselytizing activities. They must, however, remain in professional, conservative attire including a white shirt and tie. For instance, a light colored suit is acceptable. They are also allowed to wear a sweater or suit vest over their dress shirt and are encouraged to wear colored ties.

Sister (female) missionaries may wear skirts and dresses that cover their knees. Young women are encouraged to dress in colors and patterns, and they may wear appropriate jewelry and accessories. In 2018 it was announced that female missionaries could wear dress slacks if they wanted, except when attending the temple and during Sunday worship services, baptismal services, and mission leadership and zone conferences.

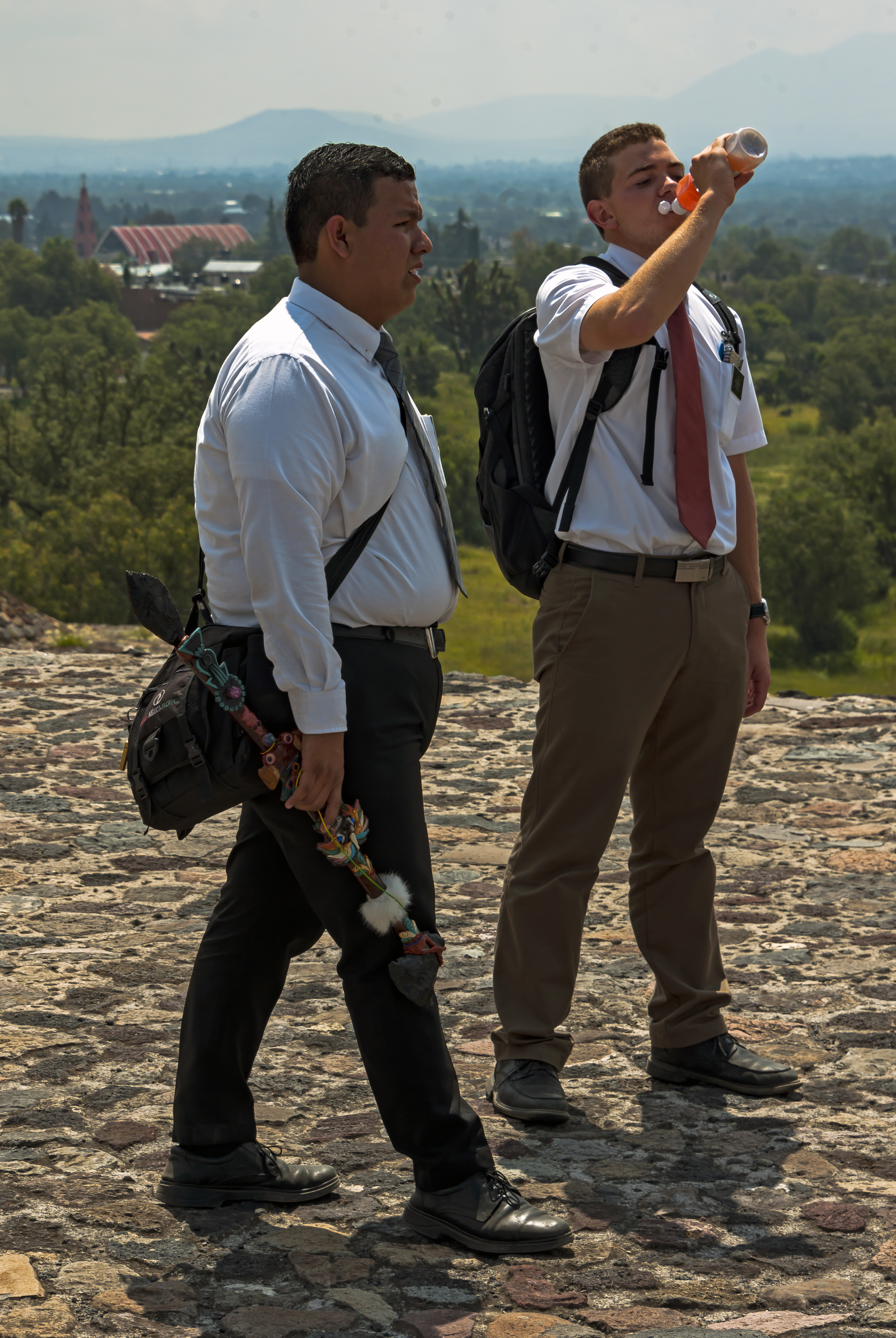
Missionaries in Mexico, dressed for tropical weather

In some areas these standards are altered slightly according to the discretion of the mission president. For example, in hot, humid climates, suit coats are not required, and dress shirts may be short-sleeved. Casual clothes may be worn only in limited circumstances, such as when missionaries exercise or provide manual labor.

In 2016, the dress guidelines were updated to allow for "simple and conservative" sunglasses and "wide-brimmed hats" as part of a missionary's attire to provide missionaries protection from excessive heat. Subsequently, in 2020, church leaders also announced approved adjustments and exceptions to the dress standards for young male missionaries, which allowed for the usage of blue shirts, along with foregoing the usage of ties, with the approval of the area presidency, although standard missionary attire for young males remains the status quo in specific circumstances (mission or zone conferences, weekly worship services, and in attending the temple).

All full-time missionaries wear a name tag that gives their surname with the appropriate title ("Elder" or "Sister" in English-speaking areas, or their equivalent titles in other languages). The name tag also bears the church's name, unless the mission president considers this inadvisable due to circumstances in the area (e.g., adverse political conditions). Missionaries are required to wear the tag at all times in public.

=== Companionships ===
A missionary companionship, consisting of two (or occasionally, three) missionaries, is the smallest organizational unit of a mission. Every missionary is assigned by the mission president to be another missionary's companion. Missionary companionships are generally maintained for months at a time and most missionaries will have served with multiple companions by the end of their mission. These companions very rarely have prior acquaintance outside of the mission. Companionships are always of the same gender.

Missionary companions are instructed to stay together at all times and not to go out of the hearing of their companion's voice or out of sight. Privacy is allowed only for personal care such as showering and using the bathroom. One of the intentions of this strict policy of staying together is to discourage missionaries from breaking any mission rules. Companions share the same living quarters and the same bedroom, but not the same bed.

When companions have conflicting personalities or interests, they are encouraged to try to resolve them themselves. If a missionary's companion is having difficulty with the work or with personal problems, missionaries are instructed to give criticism constructively, in private and with respect. In dealing with a problem, missionaries are first to raise the issue with their companion and if it is not resolved, to raise it with the mission president. "A missionary's first priority is to the Lord, then to the mission president and finally to their companion", as the missionary handbook states. High value is placed on the spiritual commitment to the virtues of humility and love. Missionaries are urged to treat the companionship as a relationship that must succeed in being cooperative and selfless, thus improving the spirituality, character and social skills of each individual missionary.

=== Senior couples ===
Senior couples serve as a companionship for the entirety of their mission and have more relaxed rules. Unlike single missionaries, they share the same bed and are able to travel outside of the mission boundaries.

Couples are not expected to follow the same proselytizing schedule of younger missionaries. Some mission rules established for younger missionaries may not apply to them. However, they should still set standards and goals and follow the same dress and grooming standards listed for younger missionaries. The mission president may assign them responsibilities other than those they received with their call.

=== Personal relationships ===
Missionaries are encouraged to write an email to their parents weekly. Since almost all of their time is otherwise occupied, other communication is limited. However, a missionary may use preparation day to correspond with any person that is resident outside of the boundaries of the mission. Missionaries do not go on vacation and, prior to February 2019, were permitted to telephone their parents only on Christmas Day, and one other day of the year, usually Mother's Day. Missionaries are provided with a free, filtered church email account to correspond with their parents on preparation day only by using a computer in a public location, such as a public library or internet café. In the event of an emergency, family members of a missionary may contact him or her via the mission president's office. In February 2019, the church announced that missionaries could communicate with their families weekly via phone call, text, or video chat, in addition to letters and email; though the missionaries themselves must initiate the conversation.

Single missionaries are prohibited from dating or courting while serving missions. The policy of companionships staying together at all times serves to discourage these activities. While missionaries may interact with members of the opposite sex, they may never be alone with them or engage in any kind of intimate physical or emotional activity (e.g., kissing, hugging, holding hands, flirting). They may not telephone, write, e-mail, or accept letters from members of the opposite sex that live in the area where they are assigned to proselytize. Missionary companionships are also asked not to visit with members of the opposite sex unless at least one person of the missionaries' same sex is present to chaperone. Alternatively, those contacts may be referred to a companionship of the same gender as the contact or to married couple missionaries, when available.

In the early days of the church, men were called to serve missions regardless of marital status. Today, however, married young men are not expected to serve missions, unless called to oversee a mission as a mission president. A call to be a mission president is typically extended to the married couple, and in turn, the entire family of the chosen mission president. Older retired couples also may serve as missionaries, but do not take their families with them.

=== Schedule ===
Sample schedule of missionaries serving in their native language
	Time																
Activity	6	7	8	9	10	11	12	1	2	3	4	5	6	7	8	9	10
Exercise																	
Eat																	
Shower and dress																	
Personal study																	
Companion study																	
Proselytize																	
Plan and pray																	

Generally, missionaries wake up at 6:30 am. After praying, exercising (30 minutes), and eating breakfast, they spend two hours studying the scriptures and other materials. If they are teaching in a foreign language, they will spend another 30 minutes to an hour studying the language. Missionaries leave their place of residence at 10 am to proselytize (or 10:30 am or 11 am if teaching in a foreign language). They have an hour for lunch and dinner, and return to their apartment by 9 pm, or 9:30 if they are in the process of teaching a lesson at the end of the day. They plan for the next day's activities, pray, and are encouraged to write in their personal journal, but are not required to. Missionaries then retire to bed at 10:30 pm.

On January 25, 2017, the church announced that schedules can be modified depending on the area in which missionaries serve.

=== Media rules ===
Missionaries are admonished to "avoid all forms of worldly entertainment". Generally, they are not permitted to watch television, listen to the radio, watch or go to movies, or use the Internet (except to use email, and social media for their work, see Personal relationships above). They are not permitted to listen to music that has romantic lyrics or overtones, or merely entertains. The general interpretation of this guideline is to listen to only religious music, such as that performed by the Tabernacle Choir at Temple Square, though the rule's application has been variable in some missions. They are permitted to read only books, magazines, or other materials authorized by the church.

These guidelines were updated in October 2017, when the church announced that in some missions, missionaries would be issued smartphones and be permitted to use technology on a wider scale. This is intended to enable the missionaries to more easily find "religiously minded people".

=== Slang ===
Missionaries are instructed to avoid slang and casual language including when they are alone in their apartment and in their letters to family. They are also instructed to refer to missionary leaders by only their correct titles. However, as with the members of any organization, some missionaries use certain missionary-specific jargon when communicating with one another. Some words and expressions are mission- or language-specific, while others are universal, such as calling the halfway point of a mission the "hump" or hump day, or describing a missionary who is excited about returning home as "trunky" as he has already packed his trunk. Foreign-language missionaries often develop a "mission language", distinct from but combining aspects of their first and acquired languages, that they use when communicating with each other; the senkyoshigo of Japan is an example.

== Number of missionaries and number of converts ==
Ratio of Converts Baptized to Full-Time Missionaries, 1971–2022 Converts Missionaries Convert to Missionary Ratio

As of the end of 2021, there were 54,539 full-time missionaries of the Church serving in 407 church missions throughout the world. Their work, often in cooperation with local members, resulted in 168,283 convert baptisms in 2021. Author David Stewart points out that the number of convert baptisms per missionary per year has fallen from a high of 8.03 in 1989 to just 4.67 in 2005. He argues that the number of converts would increase if missionaries made greater efforts in meeting new people; he points out that the average pair of missionaries spends only four or five hours per week attempting to meet new people.

== Types of missionaries ==
=== Proselytizing ===
The most visible and most common type of missionaries are typically those who proselytize door-to-door and ride bicycles for transportation. For many years, missionaries used structured lessons called "missionary discussions" (formally called "The Uniform System for Teaching the Gospel") to teach interested non-members and recent converts about the doctrines of the LDS Church and to commit them on the steps to take to become a member of the church. Missionaries were often instructed to adhere very closely to the six lessons, and they frequently quoted segments word-for-word (an especially helpful practice when learning a foreign language). The training materials also instructed missionaries to freely change the order of the lessons segments according to the needs and questions of the learners.

The missionary discussions were replaced beginning in October 2004 by a guide called Preach My Gospel which places emphasis on "teaching by the Spirit". According to members of the church, "teaching by the Spirit" means seeking guidance from the Holy Ghost to teach; the idea is that the teachings will be catered to each person who is seeking the truth through divine guidance. According to Preach My Gospel, God knows each person and can guide the missionaries to say and teach what is best for each individual.

Despite the latitude given to missionaries, the guide still contains material which should be actively taught. Chapter 3 of Preach My Gospel concisely describes all of the doctrine that the missionaries are to teach to those learning about the church. The missionaries are responsible for knowing the doctrine and continually preparing to teach it. They can choose the order that this material is taught to serve the needs of each individual. This is a change from the missionary discussions which were usually taught in order to each investigator.

The book, now published in many languages, is meant to be used by the general church membership. This sets it apart from the previous missionary discussions, which were used primarily by full-time missionaries, members with church callings related to missionary work, and those preparing to serve missions.

=== Online ===
According to The Huffington Post, the church has online missionaries, who work at a Referral Center Mission in Provo, Utah. These missionaries use the "Chat with a Mormon" homepage to talk with potential converts. The Salt Lake Tribune reported that these missionaries are more successful than traditional proselytizers. Furthermore, The Huffington Post also reported that it is now permissible for missionaries to use SMS, blogs and Facebook. The church also maintains a visitor site for people not of the faith at ComeUntoChrist.org.

=== Church-service ===
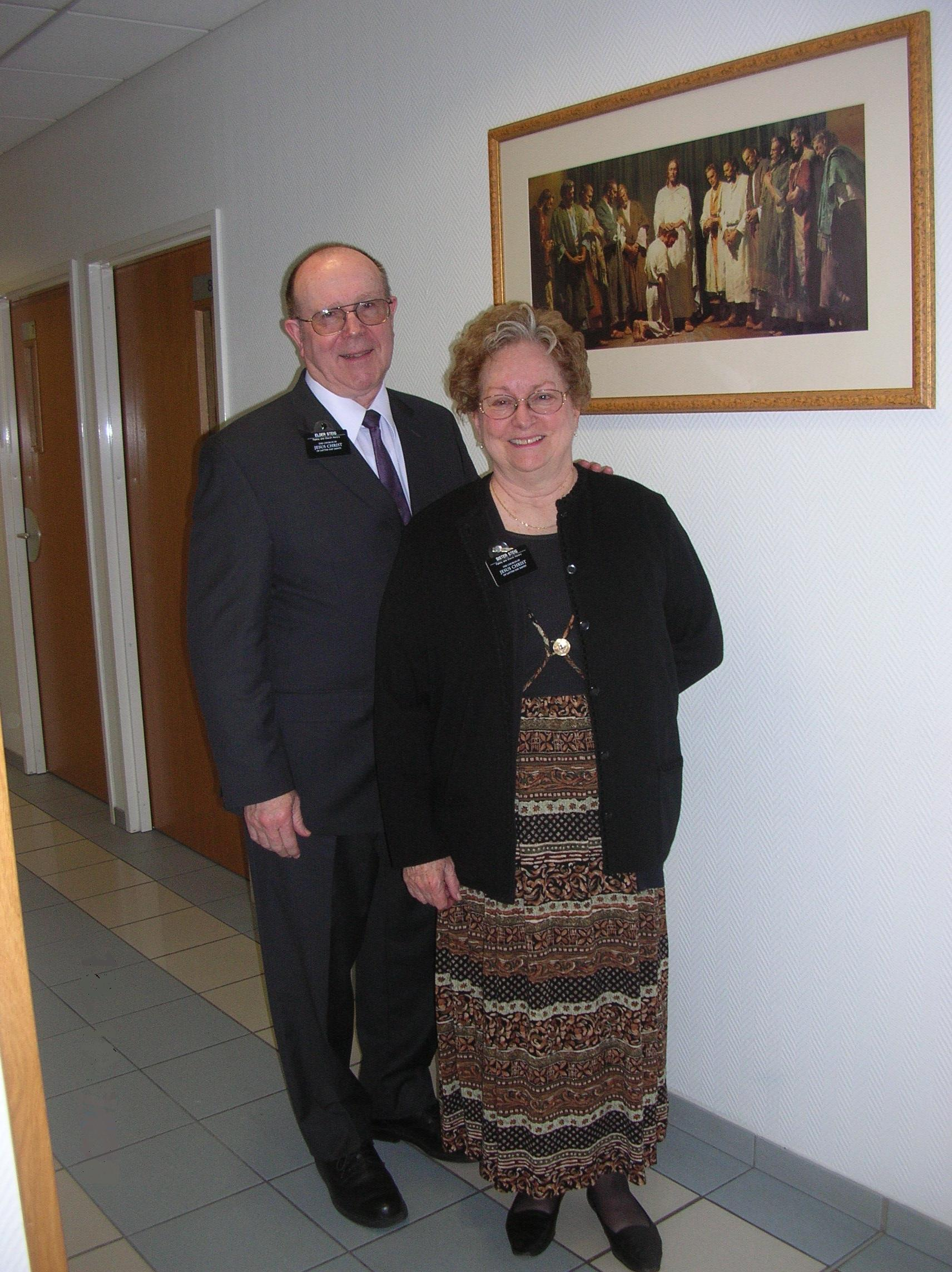
A family history missionary couple

Missionaries with special needs or health considerations may be called as full-time or part-time service missionaries. Many fully able missionaries are called to do genealogical research or act as tour guides or hosts at Temple Square or Family History libraries and other church sites. In many areas, even proselytizing missionaries spend most of their day responding to incoming phone calls and queries, delivering requested media from the church's television and radio commercials. Missionaries may use public transportation, walk, bicycle, or in some areas drive automobiles owned by the church, or occasionally ride within a private automobile with a church member who is accompanying them to a teaching appointment, proselytizing, or fellowshipping activity. At the end of 2019, there were 31,333 church-service missionaries.

=== Humanitarian aid ===
The LDS Church also has a strong welfare and humanitarian missionary program. These humanitarian missionaries typically serve in impoverished areas of the world and do not actively proselytize. Humanitarian missionaries comply with any local laws regarding teaching or displaying religious symbols, including the identifying name tags. This allows them to provide services and aid in countries where activities by religious organizations are typically restricted or forbidden, such as in predominantly Muslim countries or in Southeast Asia. Regular proselytizing missionaries are asked to engage in welfare activities and community service, limited to four hours a week on days other than weekends or preparation day.

Building missionaries were called by the president of the Tongan Mission in the early 1950s. Among their major successes was building Liahona High School. From 1955 on, Wendell B. Mendenhall institutionalized building missionaries on a larger scale with skilled tradesmen called as supervisors of the missionaries. Most of the supervisors were Americans, while most of the workers were young men indigenous to the areas of the South Pacific and Latin America where the work was carried out. However, at times the situation was more complex. One example is Jose Alvarez, who was a native of Argentina, but had lived in the United States for three years when he was called to go with his family to Chile, where he served as a building missionary supervisor. Often, trainee or assistant building supervisors would work under the leadership of an experienced supervisor in preparation for an assignment as a fully-fledged supervisor of some project or group of missionaries.

== Administration ==
=== Organization ===
Every part of the world is assigned to be within a mission of the church, whether or not LDS missionaries are active in the area. An adult male mission president presides over the missionaries in the mission.

Most missions are divided into several zones, a zone being a geographic area specified by the mission president (though these are often the same area as the LDS ecclesiastical unit known as a "stake"). A zone encompasses several more organizational units called districts. Each zone and district is presided over by leaders drawn from male missionaries serving in that area. Zone and district leaders are responsible for gathering weekly statistics, assisting missionaries in their areas of responsibility, and general accountability to the mission president for the well-being and progress of the missionaries under their stewardship. A district typically encompasses four to eight missionaries, and may or may not comprise more than one proselytizing area. An area is typically a portion of the LDS ecclesiastical unit known as a ward (or congregation), one ward, or multiple wards.

In addition to the leaders mentioned above, the mission president has two or more assistants. Assistants to the President (APs) are typically missionaries who have previously served as district and/or zone leaders. They serve as the president's executive assistants, administering policies and helping missionaries throughout the mission.

The number of missions in the church typically varies from one year to the next. The First Presidency and Quorum of the Twelve Apostles determine when new missions are created, consolidated, or discontinued. In October 2017, the church announced that, in an effort to increase missionary safety, the number of missions would be consolidated. The extent of those consolidation plans is yet to be announced.

=== Expenses ===
Missionaries are expected to pay their own expenses while on the mission, often with assistance from family. In the past, each missionary paid his or her actual living expenses, but this approach created a disproportionate burden on missionaries who were assigned to more expensive areas of the world. In 1990, a new program was introduced to equalize the financial responsibility for each missionary and his or her family. Now, all young missionaries pay a flat monthly rate which is then redistributed according to regional costs of living. The cost of a mission varies based on the country of origin of the missionary; for missionaries from the United States, the cost is US$400 per month. The cost can vary dramatically based on the country of origin. For instance, in Oceania, missionaries from Australia pay AU$395 and missionaries from New Zealand pay NZ$400, while missionaries from American Samoa pay US$85 and missionaries from Kiribati pay AU$20. Missionaries from Papua New Guinea, Solomon Islands, and Tuvalu are exempt from making any payment. The monthly rate helps to cover food, lodging, transportation, and other mission related expenses. Missionaries are asked to bring extra personal money for any personal items they would like to purchase. Once the money is received by the church it is then redistributed to the missionaries in amounts proportionate to the cost of living within the assigned mission area. As families now contribute to a general fund for missionary expenses, the sum is deductible under many nations' tax policies regarding charitable gifts.

For health care, the church provides missionaries with limited medical care. A missionary will be required to pay for any medical treatment that is considered non-essential or that is considered to be associated with a preexisting condition. The local mission office will often help missionaries find LDS doctors or dentists who can offer their services to missionaries for a small fee or for free.

Young people in the church are encouraged to save money throughout their childhood and teenage years to pay for as much of their mission as they can, although many receive assistance from parents, family, or friends. Missionaries who cannot save the required funds may obtain assistance from their home congregation or from a general missionary fund operated by the church and contributed to by Latter-day Saints around the world. Married couple missionaries are expected to pay their own costs, but in 2011 the church began paying for missionary couples' housing expenses that exceed US$1400 per month. In many areas, church members often invite locally assigned missionaries over for meals to help reduce the overall expenditures of the missionary program.

== Returned missionaries ==
A returned missionary (often abbreviated "RM") is a term used by members of the LDS Church to refer to men and women who have previously served as Mormon missionaries. Once they return home, RMs are generally encouraged to begin dating seriously and to seek marriage. Those who learned to speak a foreign language must readjust, sometimes with difficulty, to speaking their first language.

In Latter-day Saint culture, stereotypes and jokes abound regarding newly returned missionaries, most dealing with their difficulties in handling the reverse culture shock. Other stereotypes revolve around the fact that as missionaries, they lived highly structured, disciplined lives and avoided contact with members of the opposite sex, so many RMs have difficulty readjusting to social life and dating. Other stereotypes include the supposed rush of many RMs to get married as soon as possible. Many families whose daughters are old enough to marry encourage them to date RMs.

Returned missionaries are frequently called to assist in the local missionary effort and are encouraged to stay active within the LDS Church through callings and service. RMs who served in the same mission frequently stay in touch and often gather for mission reunions in Utah to coincide with the semiannual LDS General Conference.

The notion of the Mormon mission as a crucible is a common one, and the benefits gained from going through it have been used to help explain the prominence of LDS Church members in business and civic life. Mission experience has also helped prepare RMs for later engaging and prospering in non-LDS environments.

=== Prominent returned missionaries ===
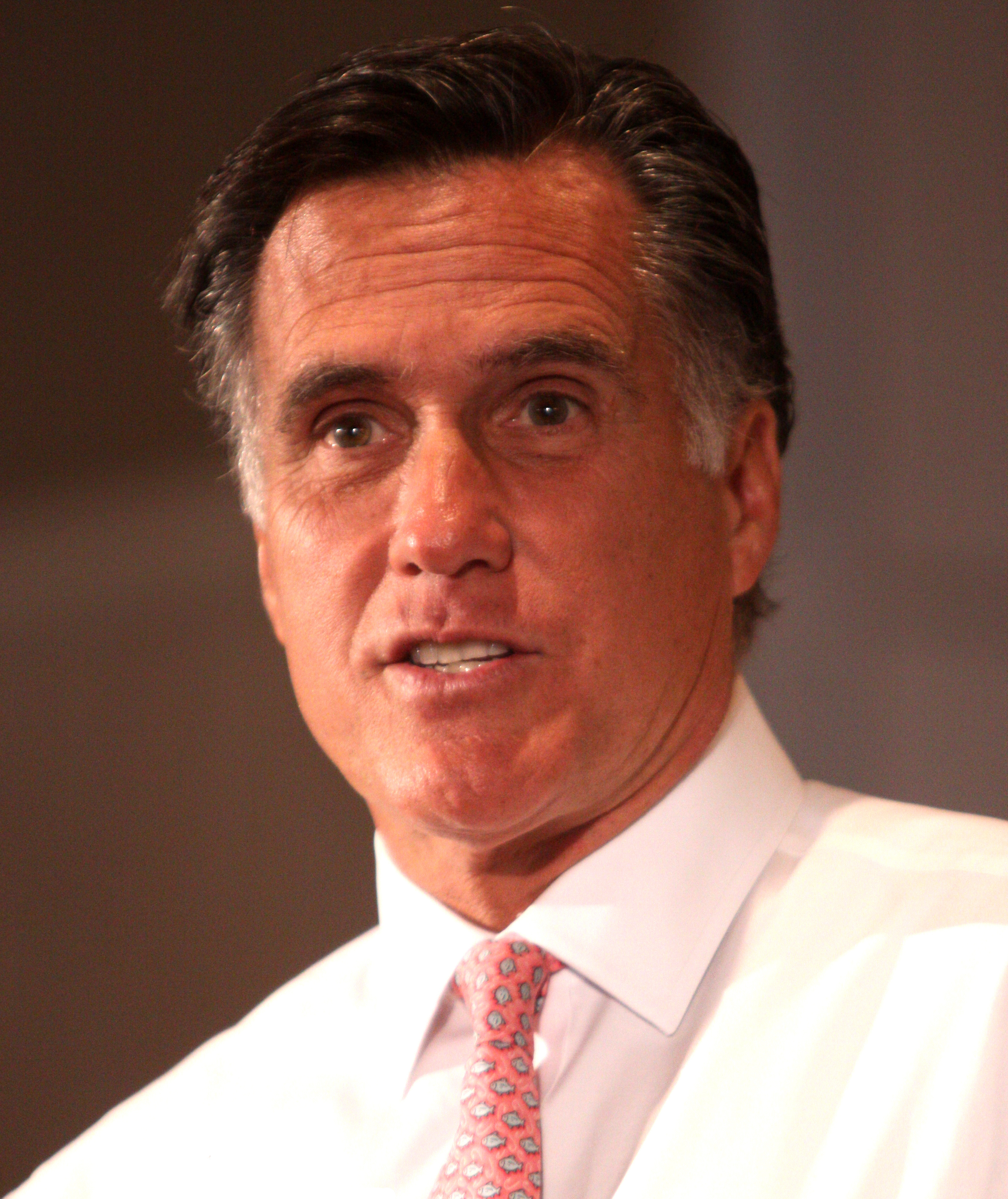
Mitt Romney (France), politician, businessman, and lawyer

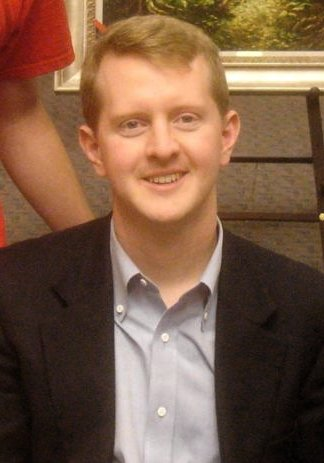
Ken Jennings (Spain), Jeopardy! champion and host

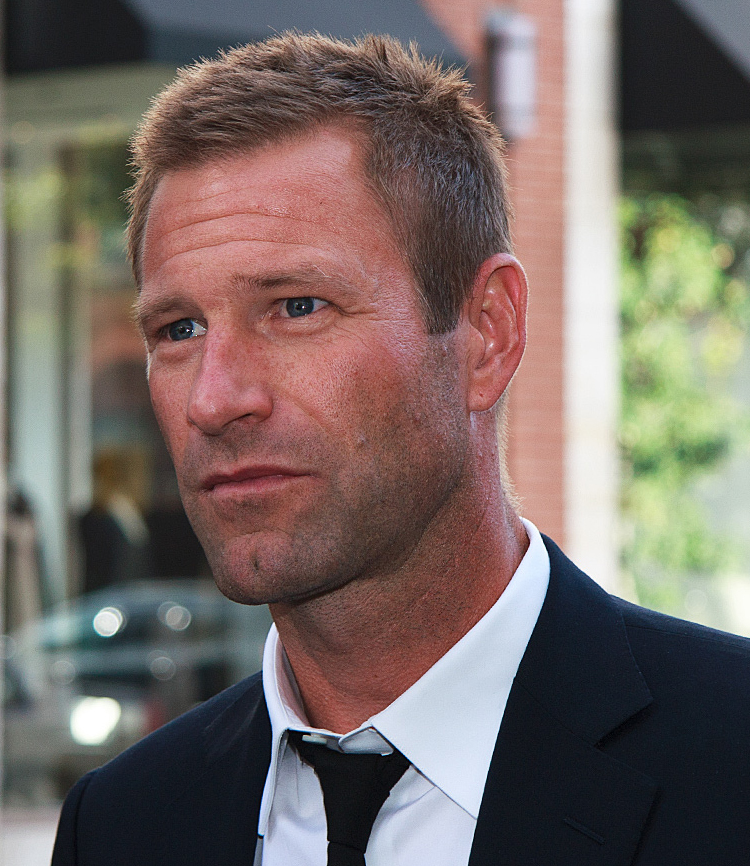
Aaron Eckhart (Switzerland), actor

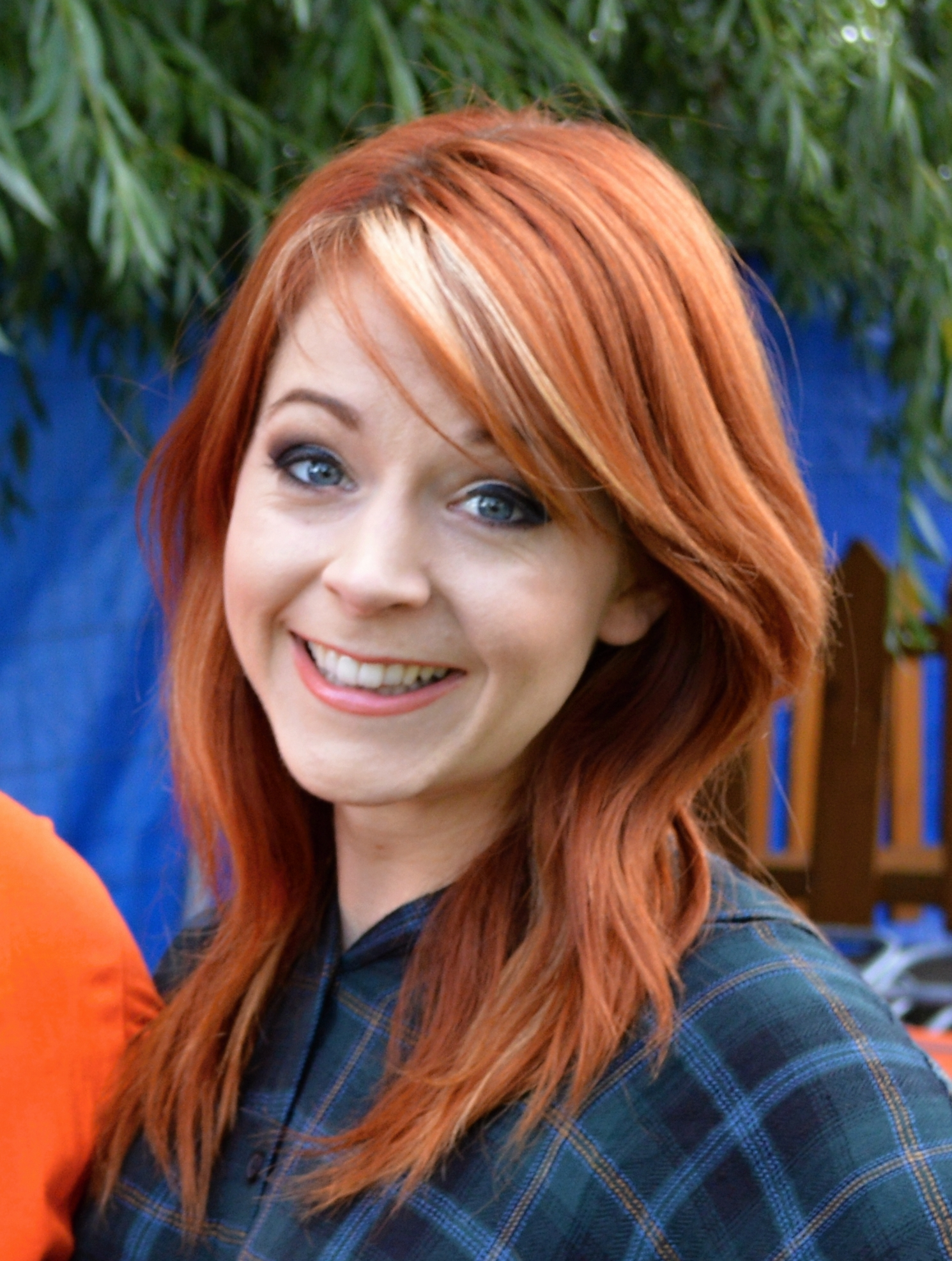
Lindsey Stirling (New York City), violinist

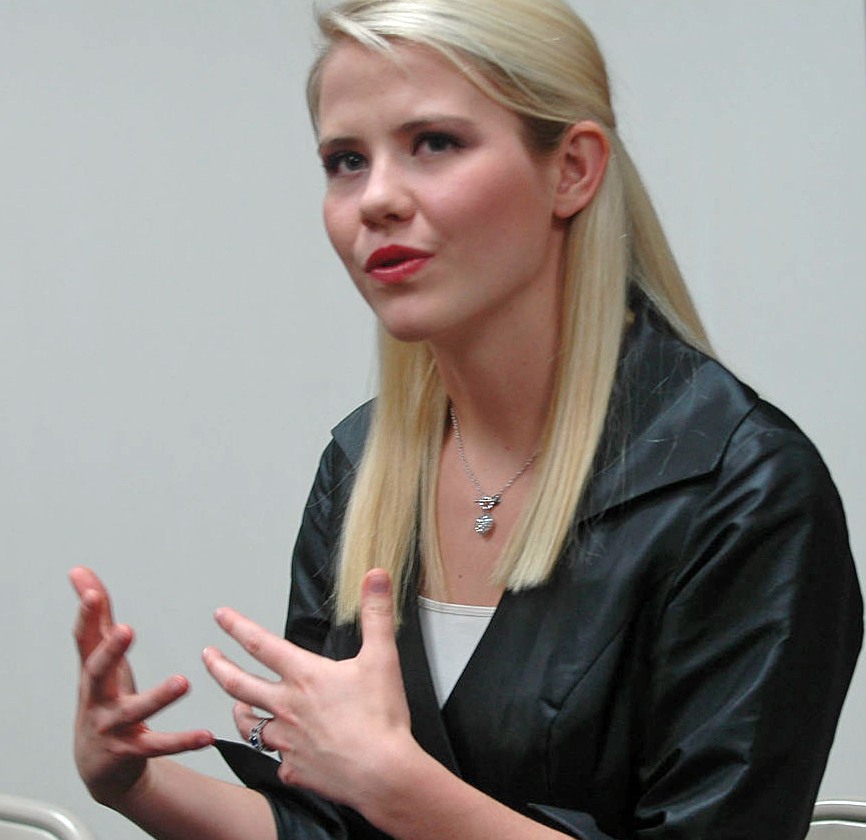
Elizabeth Smart (Paris), child safety activist

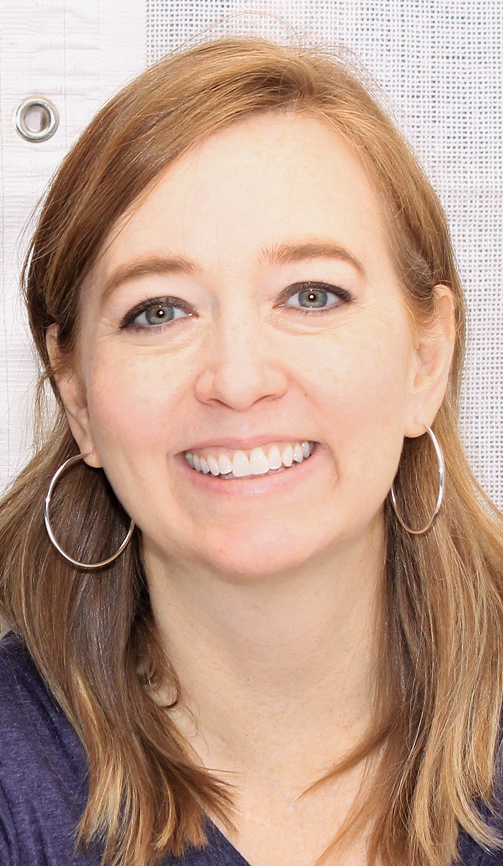
Shannon Hale (Paraguay), author

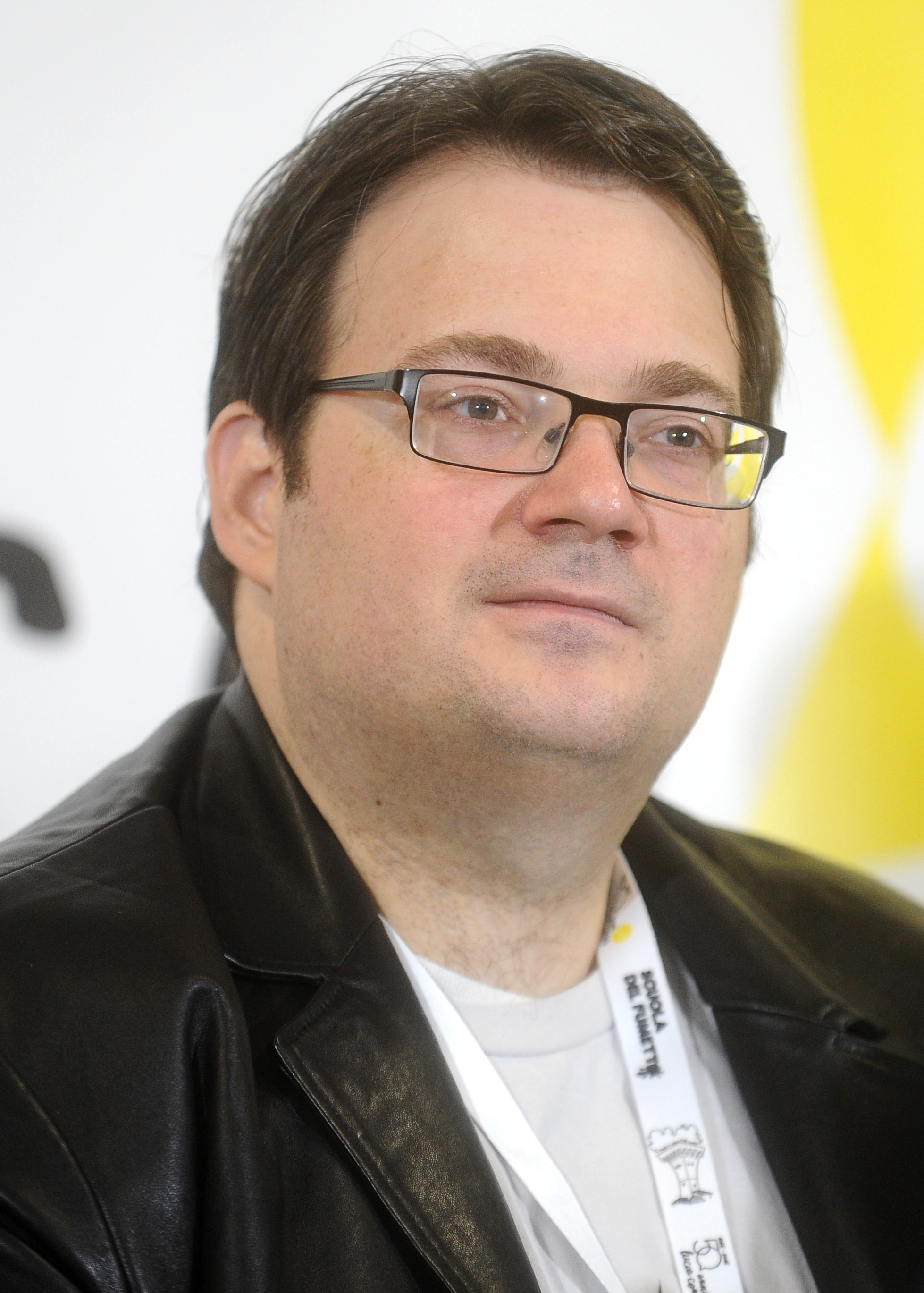
Brandon Sanderson (South Korea), author

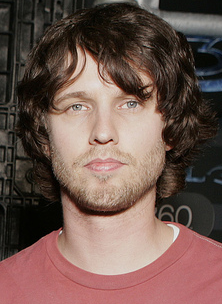
Jon Heder (Japan), actor

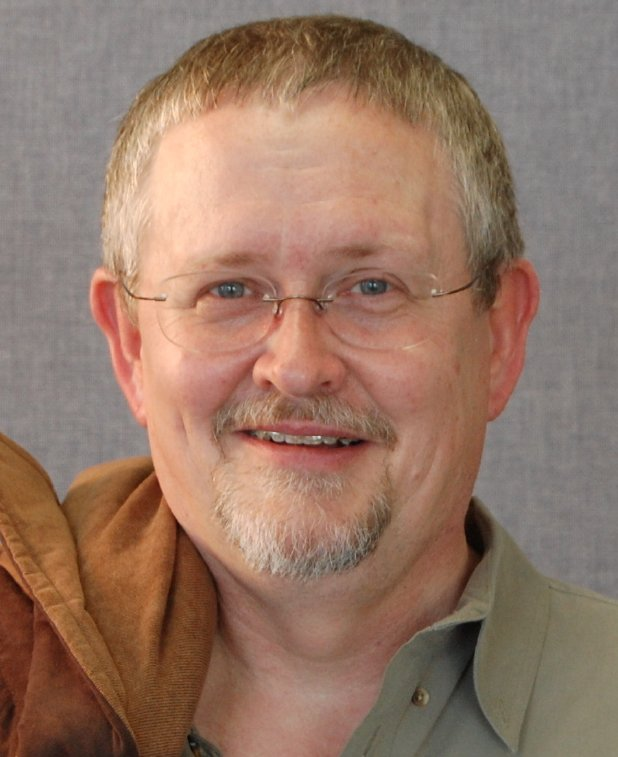
Orson Scott Card (Brazil), author

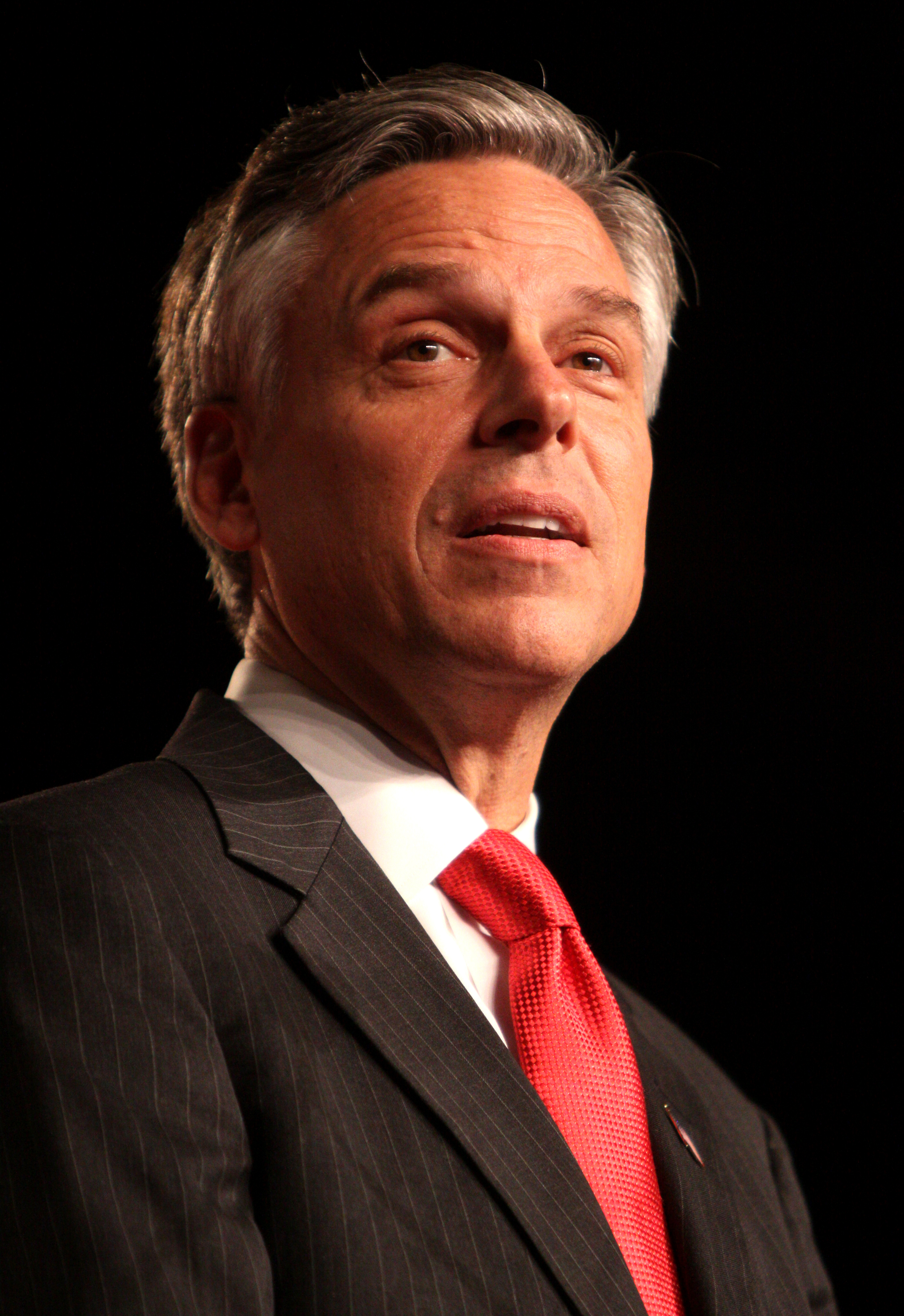
Jon Huntsman Jr. (Taiwan), businessman, diplomat, and politician

Prominent individuals who have served LDS missions include Aaron Eckhart (Switzerland/France), Shawn Bradley (Australia), Orson Scott Card (Brazil), Stephen Covey (England), Jon Heder (Japan), Ken Jennings (Spain), Elizabeth Smart (France), Lindsey Stirling (NYC), Elaine Bradley (Germany), Shannon Hale (Paraguay), Jon Huntsman Jr. (Taiwan), Brandon Sanderson (Korea), Mitt Romney (France), Paul Alan Cox (Samoa), Shay Carl (West Indies), Chad Lewis (Taiwan), Dale Murphy (Boston), Taysom Hill (Australia), William Hopoate (Australia) and David Archuleta (Chile).

== History ==
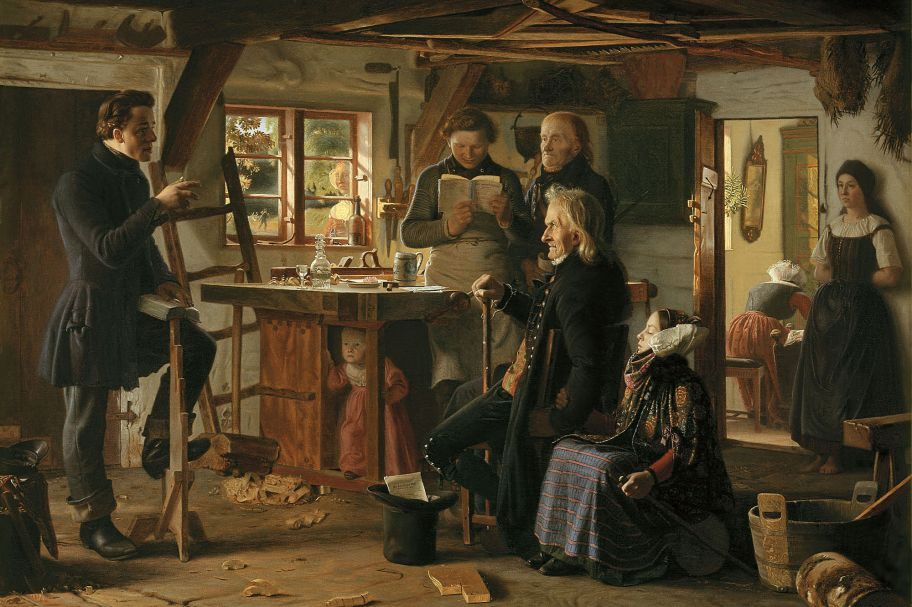
"Mormons visit a country carpenter" (1856) by Christen Dalsgaard, depicting a mid-19th century visit of a missionary to a Danish carpenter's workshop. The first missionaries arrived in Denmark in 1850.

The LDS Church regards Samuel H. Smith, the younger brother of church founder Joseph Smith, as the church's first full-time missionary. Smith traveled from city to city, covering more than 4,000 miles, trying to sell copies of the Book of Mormon. The book was presented as evidence of Joseph Smith's prophetic calling. Phineas Young received a Book of Mormon from Samuel Smith and became an early member of the church. (Phineas' younger brother Brigham would later be baptized and become the 2nd president of the LDS Church.)

During the 1850s missionaries were sent to Chile, France, Germany, Hawaii, India, Italy, Scandinavia, Switzerland and a number of other regions.

In 1898, the church began allowing single women to be called as missionaries. The first two single female missionaries were Jennie Brimhall and Inez Knight, who were called to serve as companions in England.

As more members became aware of Joseph Smith's First Vision during the late 1800s and early 1900s, it began to take on a prominent role in the conversion narrative. The story of the First Vision was first published in a missionary tract in 1910.

Each mission was responsible for individually developing lessons until 1952 when, under the direction of Gordon B. Hinckley, the church published "A Systematic Program for Teaching the Gospel". In 1961, towards the beginning of the church's correlation effort, "A Uniform System for Teaching Investigators" was made mandatory church-wide. The missionary lessons, or "discussions", continued to be updated with major revisions approximately every decade up until the publication of Preach My Gospel in 2004. Early missionaries, like Samuel Smith, relied primarily on the story of the Book of Mormon to attract converts to the church. By the late 19th century, the story of Joseph Smith's first vision had gained prominence and was given an important role in the official missionary lessons.

In the early 1950s, Henry D. Moyle had responsibility over the missionary department. Moyle encouraged missionaries to use a tactic that later became known as "baseball baptism". Missionaries would encourage young men to join church-sponsored sports leagues and baptism was imposed as a prerequisite. The use of this tactic created a large number of converts, especially in England, but very few of the young men ever had any interest in the spiritual aspects of the church. Moyle introduced baptism goals, missionary incentives and other salesmanship techniques into the church missionary department. David O. McKay eventually removed Moyle from his responsibilities over the missionary program but many of the changes introduced during this time remain even today.

During the 1960s, missionaries whose area of service required them to learn a new language were first sent to the Language Training Mission on the BYU campus. This later became the Missionary Training Center in 1978 where all new missionaries were sent for training not just the ones learning a language.

Starting during Spencer W. Kimball's administration, it was emphasized that "every able, worthy young man" had a duty to serve a mission. Prior to this, missionary service for men was not viewed as obligatory. This resulted in an increase in the number of young men choosing to serve missions.

Before 1978, the church did not permit people of African descent to hold the priesthood, and they were not actively proselytized. Missionary work in places such as Brazil may have increased pressure to change the policy due to the difficulty of verifying lack of African descent in these populations. When the policy was eliminated by Kimball, additional areas of the world were opened up to missionary work.

Church researchers discovered that in addition to the content of the lessons, the way in which the material was presented had a major impact on conversion. In 1984, the Missionary Department codified the "commitment pattern" as the proper way for missionaries to teach the lessons. This involves the missionaries making specific invitations to act in response to the lessons. Gospel students would be encouraged to make personal commitments to attend church, to read the Book of Mormon and to be baptized.

In 2002, apostle M. Russell Ballard delivered a General Conference address stating that the bar to qualify for missionary service had been raised and that "the day of the 'repent and go' missionary is over".

During the church's October 2012 General Conference, church president Thomas S. Monson announced that the minimum age for missionary service for young men had been lowered from 19 to 18 and that the minimum age for young women had been lowered from 21 to 19. Immediately following the announcement, the church experienced an unprecedented influx of new missionaries. The rate of new missionaries swelled "by 471 percent, from about 700 new applications per week to about 4,000 each week, with young women comprising more than half of the new applicants". In 2013, the number of missionaries peaked at 89,000 and had dropped to 65,137 by the end of 2018. Throughout the history of the church, over one million missionaries have been sent on missions.

In 2019, it was announced that 18-25 year old members could serve service missions. In this, they would have to still follow the same worthiness standards, but would stay home and do service projects in their local areas. This was presented as an alternative for people who are disabled or have physical or mental health issues that prevent them from a proselytizing mission, and those who were sent home early to complete their time for the proselytizing mission.

As a result of the COVID-19 pandemic, many missionaries were transferred to different areas or returned home. In February 2020, there were 68,000 and within several months that number dropped to 42,000. In 200 of 407 mission areas, missionary work was performed mainly from their apartments using technology. Most regular in-person missionary work returned by the summer of 2021.

=== Incidents ===
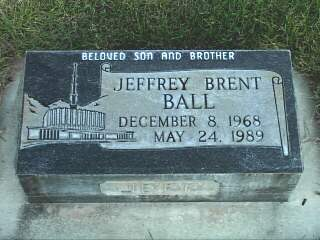
Headstone of a missionary that was murdered by the Zarate Willka Armed Forces of Liberation while serving in Bolivia

Although rare, missionaries have been the victims of violence. In 1974, two young-adult male missionaries were murdered in Austin, Texas, by Robert Elmer Kleason. In 1977, the case of a Mormon missionary who said he was abducted and raped by a woman was covered extensively by newspapers in Britain, being dubbed the manacled Mormon case. In 1979, two senior sister missionaries were murdered in Berkeley County, South Carolina and one was raped. In 1989, the Zarate Willka Armed Forces of Liberation killed two American missionaries in Bolivia. From 1999 to 2006, three LDS missionaries were murdered worldwide, while 22 died in accidents of some sort. In 2008, three men from Port Shepstone, South Africa were convicted of raping and robbing two female LDS missionaries in June 2006.

A few cases of kidnapping have also occurred, one being in 1998, when two male missionaries were abducted while working in the Samara region of Russia. The kidnappers demanded US$300,000 for their return. The missionaries were released unharmed a few days later without payment of the ransom.

== In popular culture ==
Mormon missionaries have been portrayed in various popular culture media. Missionaries are the main focus of Mormon cinema films God's Army (1999), The Other Side of Heaven (2001), The Best Two Years (2003), The R.M. (2003), God's Army 2: States of Grace (2005), The Errand of Angels (2008), and The Saratov Approach (2013). The musical Saturday's Warrior (1973) features missionaries and was made into a film in 1989. The DVD series Liken the Scriptures occasionally shows missionaries.

Missionaries were featured in the PBS documentary Get the Fire (2003), as well as in the Tony Award-winning satirical Broadway musical The Book of Mormon. Hollywood portrayed missionaries in Yes Man (2008) starring Jim Carrey, and British film Millions also mentioned missionaries.

Films portraying missionaries gone astray include Trapped by the Mormons (1922), Orgazmo (1997), and Latter Days (2003). Mormon missionaries appeared at the end of the American horror film The Strangers (2008); the missionaries were depicted as children as opposed to young men.

In 2008, former missionary Chad Hardy was subjected to church discipline after releasing a pin-up calendar titled "Men on a Mission", which consisted of pictures of scantily clad returned missionaries.

The 2024 horror film Heretic depicts two young sister missionaries who find themselves trapped in the home of a man who invites them in to discuss religion. It stars Sophie Thatcher and Chloe East, who were both raised Mormon.

== See also ==
- Anticipatory socialization
- List of missions of The Church of Jesus Christ of Latter-day Saints
- Delta Phi Kappa, a now-defunct fraternity for returned male missionaries
- Yesharah Society, a now-defunct organization for returned female missionaries
- Mormon missionary diarists
