= List of Utah suffragists =

This is a list of Utah suffragists, suffrage groups and others associated with the cause of women's suffrage in Utah.

== Groups ==
- Colored Women's Republican Club.
- Female Relief Society of Nauvoo, created in 1842.
- Utah Council of Women.
- Woman Suffrage Association of Farmington.
- Woman Suffrage Association of Glenwood.
- Woman Suffrage Association of Utah.

== Suffragists ==
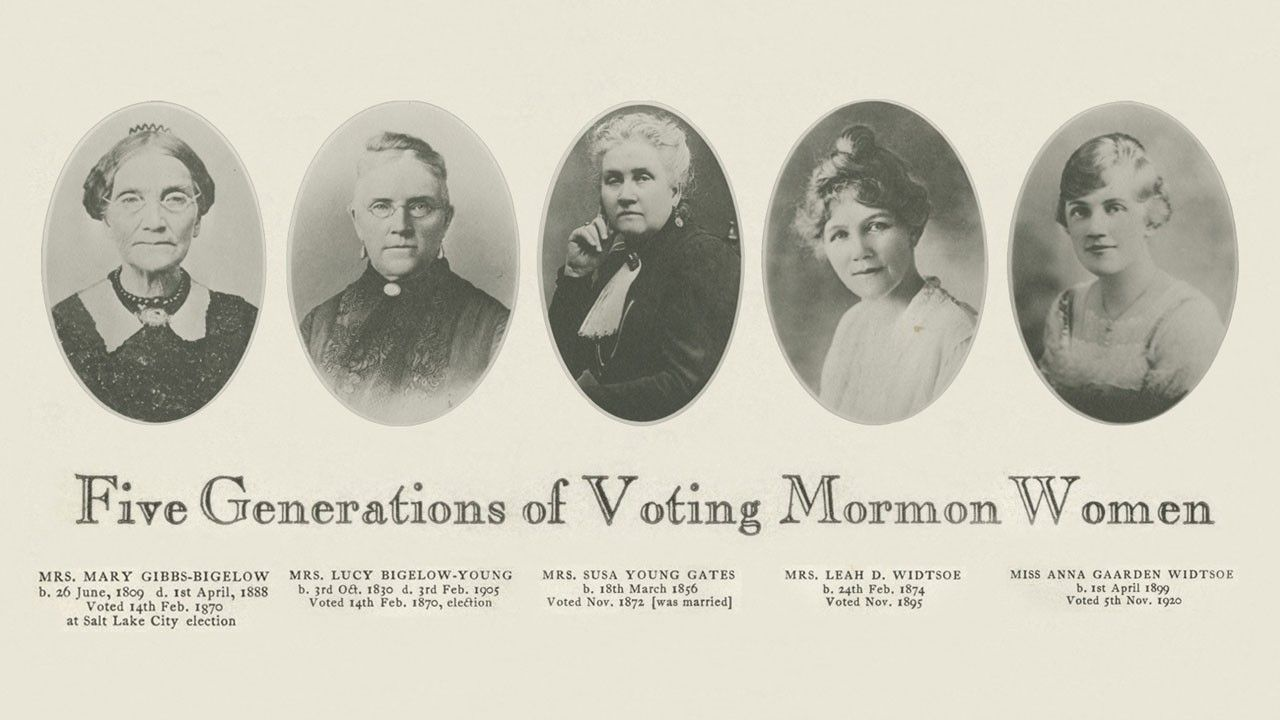
Five generations of voting Mormon women, image c. 1920

- Phebe Y. Beattie.
- Margaret N. Caine.
- George Q. Cannon.
- Martha Hughes Cannon.
- Lucy A. Clark.
- Margaret Zane Cherdron.
- Elizabeth M. Cohen.
- Lucinda Lee Dalton (Beaver).
- Marilla M. Daniels.
- Maria Y. Dougall.
- Julia P. M. Farnsworth.
- Ruth May Fox.
- Elizabeth R. Fraser.
- Susa Young Gates.
- Annie Thompson Godbe.
- Augusta W. Grant.
- Elizabeth A. Hayward.
- Elizabeth Howard.
- Sarah M. Kimball.
- Hannah Lapish.
- Nellie Little.
- Alice Nesbitt.
- Anna T. Piercey.
- Mary Minnie Quay.
- Emily S. Richards.
- Lovern Robertson.
- Aurelia S. Rogers.
- Lulu L. Shepard (Salt Lake City).
- Jane Skolfield.
- Bathsheba W. Smith.
- Eliza R. Snow.
- Minnie J. Snow.
- Emily W. Stevenson.
- Anstis Elmina Shepard Taylor.
- Elizabeth A. Taylor.
- Emmeline B. Wells.
- Florence L. Westcott.
- Seraph Young.
- Zina D. H. Young.
- Zina P. Young Card.

== Places ==
- City and County Building.
- Council Hall.

== Publications ==
- Utah Woman Suffrage Song Book.
- The Woman's Exponent.

== Suffragists campaigning in Utah ==
- Susan B. Anthony.
- Carrie Chapman Catt.
- Clara Bewick Colby.
- Mary Garrett Hay.
- Elizabeth Lyle Saxon.
- Elizabeth Cady Stanton.

== See also ==
- Timeline of women's suffrage in Utah
- Women's suffrage in Utah
- Women's suffrage in the United States
