= Timeline of women's suffrage in Utah =

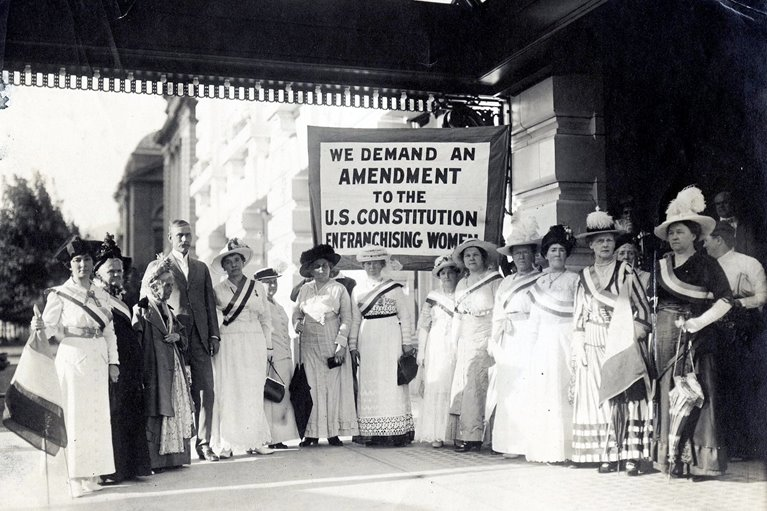
1915 Suffragists in the lobby of Hotel Utah with Senator Reed Smoot

This is a timeline of women's suffrage in Utah. Women earned the right to vote on February 12, 1870 while Utah was still a territory. The first woman to vote under equal suffrage laws was Seraph Young on February 14, 1870. During this time, suffragists in Utah continued to work with women in other states to promote women's suffrage. Women continued to vote until 1887 when the Edmunds-Tucker Act was passed. When Utah was admitted as a state in 1896, women regained the right to vote. On September 30, 1919 Utah ratifies the Nineteenth Amendment. Native American women did not have full voting rights in Utah until 1957.

== 19th century ==
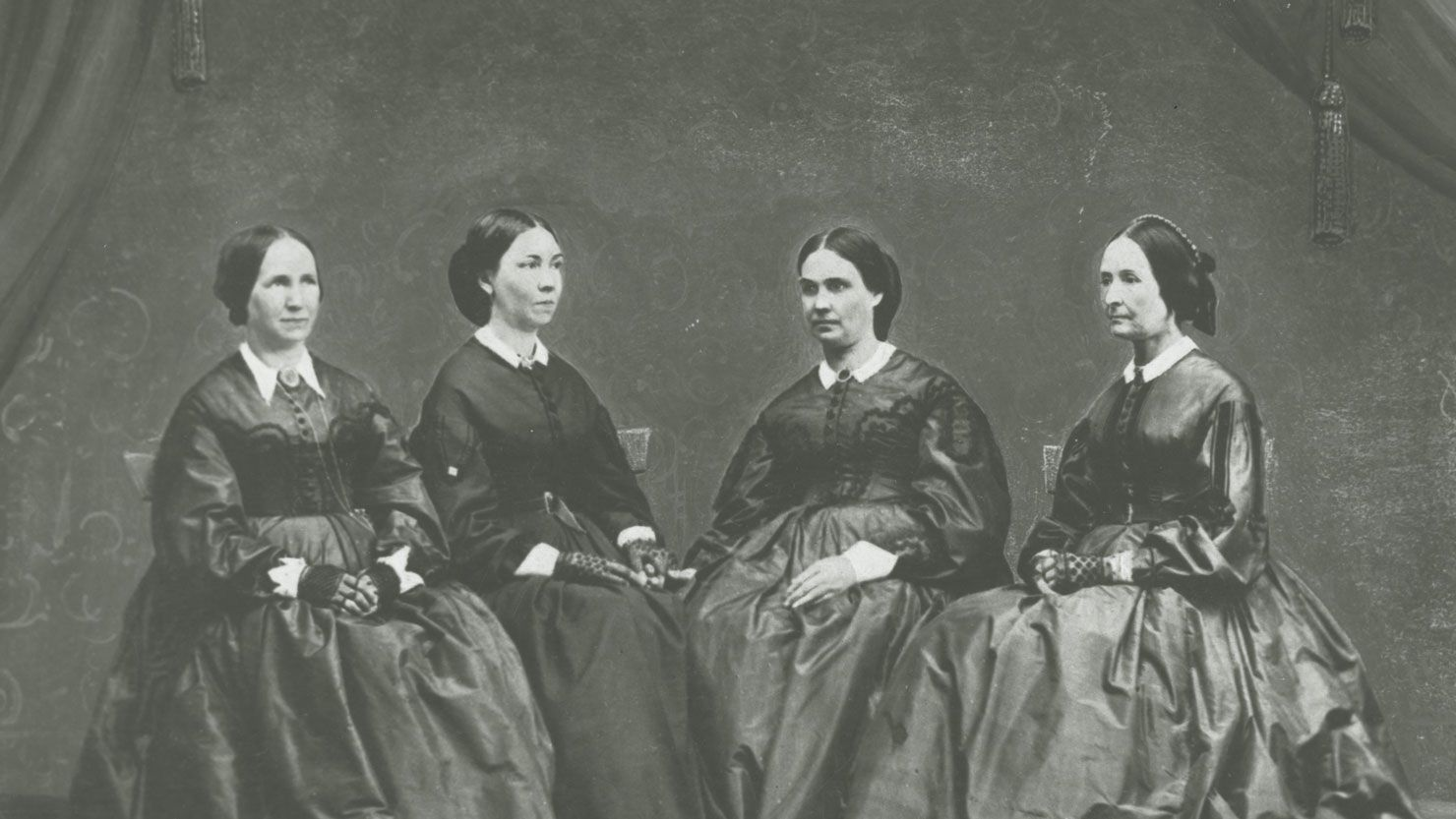
Leading women of Zion 1897, Zina D. H Young, Bathsheba W. Smith, Emily Dow Partridge Young, Eliza R. Snow

=== 1840s ===
1842

- Female Relief Society of Nauvoo is formed.

=== 1860s ===
1868

- Newspaper editorial from The New York Times about giving Utah women equal suffrage is appreciated in Utah.
- The Deseret News posts an editorial about the justice of women's suffrage.

=== 1870s ===
1870

- February 12: Utah gives women the right to vote.
- February 14: First woman to vote in the United States under equal suffrage laws was Seraph Young in Salt Lake City.

1871

- Susan B. Anthony and Elizabeth Cady Stanton visit Salt Lake City.

1872

- The Woman's Exponent is created.

1879

- Emmeline B. Wells represents Utah at the National Woman's Suffrage Convention.

=== 1880s ===
1880

- A case in the Supreme Court of the Territory attempts to erase the names of several women from the voter registration list, but does not succeed.

1882

- In Salt Lake City, a registrar refuses to add women to the list of registered voters. The case is settled and women continue to vote.

1887

- Passage of the Edmunds-Tucker Act disenfranchises Utah women.

1888

- Mrs. Arthur Brown and Emily S. Richards represent Utah at the National Suffrage Convention in Washington, D.C.
- September: Clara Bewick Colby and Elizabeth Lyle Saxon visit Salt Lake City to lecture on suffrage.

1889

- The Utah Woman Suffrage Association is created.

=== 1890s ===
1890

- Maria Y. Dougall and Sarah M. Kimball are delegates to the National Suffrage Convention in Washington, D.C.

1891

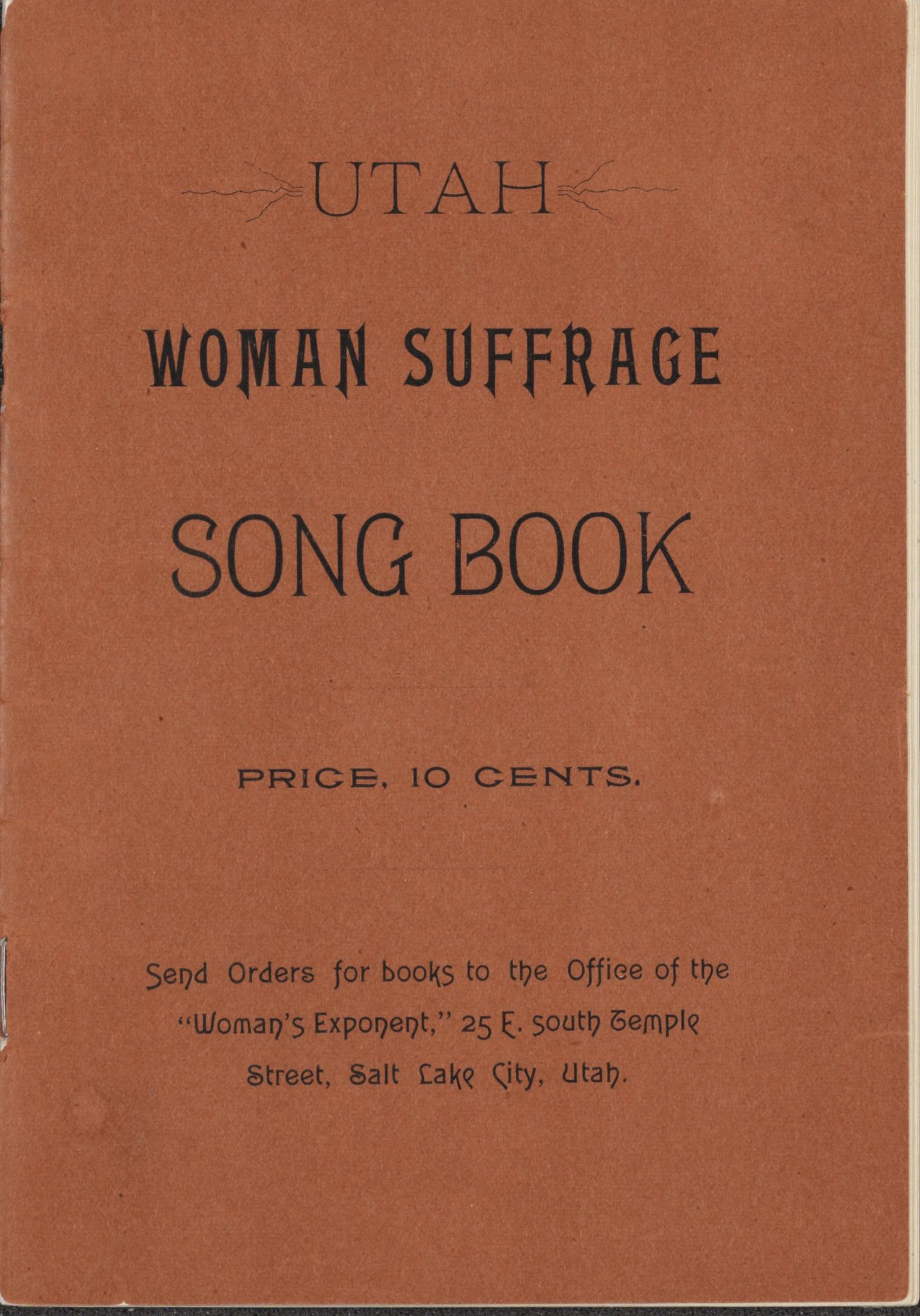
Utah woman suffrage song book, first published in 1891

- February 15: Suffragists celebrated the birthday of Susan B. Anthony in Salt Lake City.
- The Utah Woman Suffrage Song Book is published.

1892

- July 29: Suffragists hold a rally in American Fork.
- Wells travels through California and Idaho and speaks on women's suffrage.

1893

- Suffragists held a garden party in Salt Lake City.

1895

- February 18: Suffragists hold a convention in the Salt Lake City and County building.

1896

- Utah women regained the right to vote.
- Martha Hughes Cannon becomes the first woman elected to state senate.

1897

- January: Wells attends the National Suffrage Convention in Des Moines, Iowa and describes suffrage efforts in Utah.

1899

- Carrie Chapman Catt and Mary Garrett Hay visit Salt Lake City.

== 20th century ==
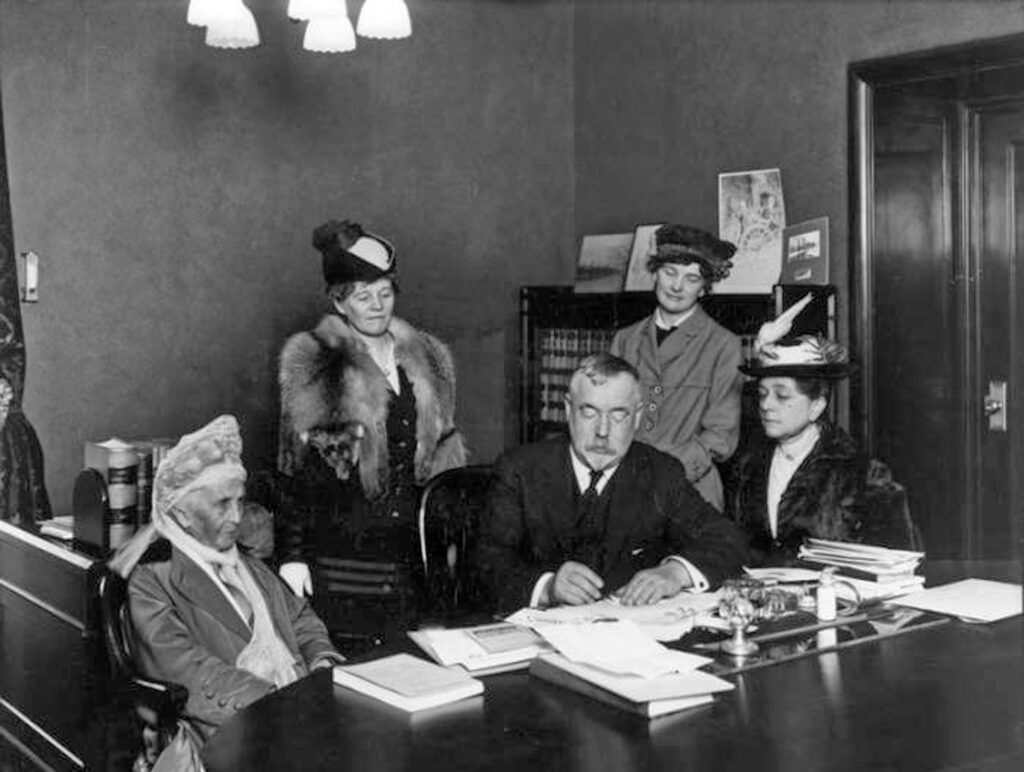
Governor William Spry of Utah meets with suffrage leaders, Emmeline Wells and others in 1915

=== 1900s ===
- Suffragists from Utah obtain 40,000 names for a women's suffrage petition to the United States Congress.
- Utah suffragists send delegates to the National Presidential Conventions.

=== 1910s ===
1919

- September 30: Utah ratifies the Nineteenth Amendment.

=== 1920s ===
1920

- February 12: Fiftieth anniversary celebration of women's suffrage in Utah.

1924

- The Indian Citizenship Act gives more voting rights to Native American women.

=== 1950s ===
1957

- Utah repeals laws that prevent residents of Native American reservations from voting.

== See also ==
- List of Utah suffragists
- Women's suffrage in Utah
- Women's suffrage in the United States
