= Della Lindley Straup =

American educator and club woman

- Born: November 27, 1866; South Bend, Indiana
- Died: September 8, 1947 (aged 80)
- Burial place: Mount Olivet Cemetery (Salt Lake City)
- Spouse: Daniel Newton Straup

Della Lindley Straup (November 27, 1866 – September 8, 1947) was an American educator and clubwoman.

== Early life ==
Adele "Della" Lindley was born November 27, 1866, near South Bend, Indiana, the daughter of Ashbury Lindley and Mary Elizabeth Huston. She married Daniel Newton Straup in April 1889 in Valparaiso, Indiana.

== Career ==
Straup taught school in Indiana and Utah. By 1890, she was assistant principal of a high school in Salt Lake City's fourteenth ward. She was the first president of her district's Federation of Women's Clubs, presided over the district's Women's Republican Club for two years, led the Ladies Literary Club for one year, and was a charter member of the Reviewers Club.

== Personal life ==
The Straups moved to Salt Lake City, Utah in 1890 and had three daughters: Cordelia, Rosalind, and Danella. (He served as a justice for the Utah State Supreme Court from 1905 until 1917 and from 1924 through 1934.)

Della Lindley Straup died on September 15, 1947, and is buried at Mount Olivet Cemetery in Salt Lake City with Judge Straup, who died in 1945.

== See also ==
- Salt Lake City School District
- Utah women's political organizations
