= Women's suffrage in Utah =

Right of women to vote in the U.S. state of Utah

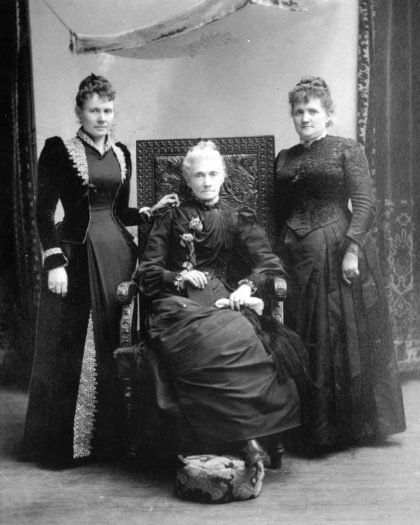
Emily S. Richards (co-founder of Utah Woman Suffrage Association), Phebe Y. Beattie (executive committee chair of UWSA), and Sarah Granger Kimball (second president of UWSA).

Women's suffrage was first granted in Utah in 1870, in the pre-federal period, decades before statehood. Among all U.S. states and territories, only Wyoming granted suffrage to women earlier than Utah. Because Utah held several elections before Wyoming, Utah women were the first women to cast ballots in the United States under an equal suffrage law. However, in 1887 the Edmunds–Tucker Act was passed by Congress in an effort to curtail Mormon influence in the territorial government, disallowing the enfranchisement of the women residents within Utah Territory. Women regained the vote upon Utah statehood in 1896, when lawmakers included the right in the state constitution.

== Enfranchisement of women in Utah ==
=== Political and social climate ===
As Utah Territory grew, the influence of the Church of Jesus Christ of Latter-day Saints (LDS Church) over the territory increased. Polygamy, at the time, was a common practice for the Latter-day Saints and the United States Congress was concerned about the growing population and power of the Saints. A New York suffragist, Hamilton Wilcox, proposed testing women's suffrage in the territories in 1867, specifically in Utah, because of the large population of females, and predicted that as a "fringe benefit, the Mormon system of plural wives would be eliminated." The New York Times circulated the idea that women's enfranchisement in Utah would probably end polygamy. Representative George Washington Julian in 1869 submitted legislation to enfranchise women in western territories. His bill was entitled A Bill to Discourage Polygamy in Utah. Neither of the bills led to new laws; nevertheless, these ideas suggested Congress had the power to eradicate the practice of polygamy.

Male leaders within the LDS Church were actually the ones who moved to enfranchise the state's women. The first talk of women suffrage within Utah was from William S. Godbe, Edward W. Tullidge, and E.L.T. Harrison, Mormon liberals, who published the Utah Magazine which eventually became the Salt Lake Tribune. They wanted the LDS Church to work with groups outside of itself to promote manufacturing and mining. The Godbe movement also encouraged women's rights activities, understanding that enfranchising women would strengthen rather than undermine the church and challenge the portrayal of polygamy as modern slavery. Later on, the Deseret News often credited the Godbe movement with the first push for the enfranchisement of women. The Godbe movement helped organize the first territory meeting on women's suffrage with Eastern suffragists. Charlotte Godbe, one of William S. Godbe's four wives, pushed for suffrage. When William Godbe was excommunicated (for apostasy, not for suffrage activities), his other three wives left the LDS Church. Charlotte continued to promote women's rights as a representative of the LDS Church. She often worked alone.

As talk about polygamy increased within the United States, Anna Elizabeth Dickinson, a women's suffragist, toured the United States giving speeches about the degrading effect polygamy had on Latter-day Saint women. Within Utah Territory, Sarah Ann Cooke and Jennie Anderson Froiseth founded the Anti-Polygamy Society in response to the Carrie Owen case. Their goal "to fight to the death that system which so enslaves and degrades our sex, and which robs them of so much happiness." Polygamy was a sensational topic through the United States, and many people outside of the Utah territory were convinced that, with the right to vote, Latter-day-Saint women would put an end to polygamy.

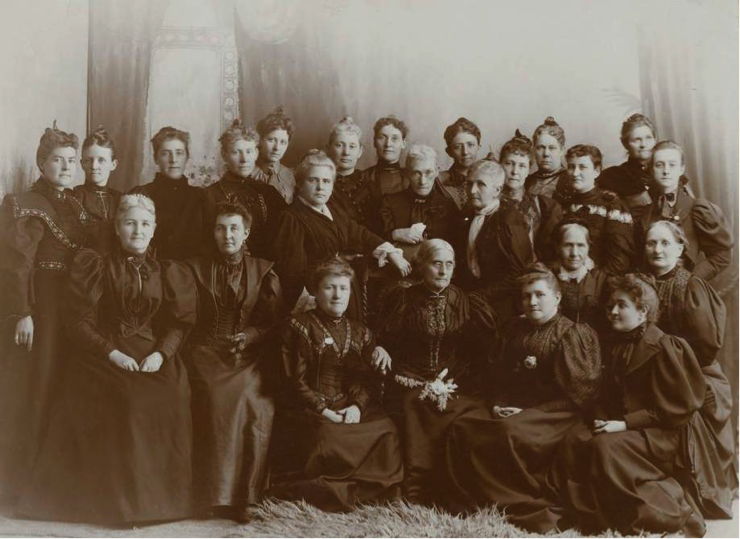
Suffragists at the Rocky Mountain Suffrage Meeting in Salt Lake City in 1895, including national leaders Susan B. Anthony and Anna Howard Shaw. Among present are notable Utah suffragists, Sarah Granger Kimball, Emmeline B. Wells and Zina D. H. Young. Utah State Historical Society. By 1890, Kimball was the first president of the Utah Women's Suffrage Association and a leader in the national suffrage movement.

=== Gaining suffrage ===
The Chairman of the House and Committee on territories, Shelby M. Cullom, in 1869 sponsored a bill to enforce the 1862 Morrill Anti-Bigamy Act. The bill would increase federal authority over Utah Territory and prevent polygamists from holding public office. Latter-day Saint women heavily protested the bill, rallying together in Salt Lake City to protest Cullom's legislation. In an effort to control the rumors and opinions of Latter-day Saint women the Utah Legislative Authority considered the enfranchisement of women in Utah territory. After two weeks by unanimous vote, the Utah Legislature passed a bill enfranchising women. William Henry Hooper stated that the reason for enfranchisement was "to convince the country how utterly without foundation the popular assertions were concerning the women of the Territory, some members of the Legislative Assembly were in favor of passing the law." Acting governor of Utah Territory, S. A. Mann, signed the law on February 12, 1870. Women above the age of twenty-one were now allowed to vote in Utah Territory although their enfranchisement had little to do with female involvement. On February 14, 1870, two days after the territorial legislature's decision to enfranchise women, Seraph Young became the first American woman to vote under equal suffrage laws. She was joined that day by 25 other women who all participated in a municipal election. Other Utah women voted in municipal elections that spring, and thousands of Utah women cast ballots in the general election on August 1, 1870.

Susan B. Anthony and Elizabeth Cady Stanton of the National Woman Suffrage Association visited Utah in June 1871 to observe the suffrage experiment with an invitation from Charlotte Godbe. Charlotte Godbe wanted Anthony and Stanton to see the positive impact of enfranchisement in Utah Territory. The two national suffragists lectured at the "Liberal Institute." Then later spoke at the old tabernacle on Temple Square where Stanton presented the National Woman Suffrage Association's (NWSA) views on equal rights to the women of The Church of Jesus Christ. During this lecture, Stanton counseled the Latter-day Saint women to focus on "quality rather than quantity" when raising and bearing children. Stanton also advised bearing a child only once every five years. After this lecture, Stanton was not allowed to speak from Latter-day Saint podiums again.

For unknown reasons, the bill granting women's suffrage in Utah did not include a provision granting the right for women to hold office. For over a decade after the bill was passed, however, the legislature considered granting women the right to hold office. In 1878, one woman was nominated to the office of county treasurer, but her nomination had to be withdrawn because she was not eligible under Utah law to hold office. A law was passed by the legislature in the previous term to give women officeholding rights, but the governor had failed to sign it. Another bill proposed in 1880 also failed to pass, and by then Congressional efforts to disenfranchise the Mormon community as a whole took precedence. It wasn't until Utah was admitted to the Union as a state in 1896 that women were re-enfranchised and given the right to hold office, with their state constitution providing that the right "to vote and hold office shall not be denied or abridged on account of sex.”

=== The Woman's Exponent ===
The Woman's Exponent was founded in 1872 with Lula Greene Richards as its first editor. Emmeline B. Wells would become the exponent's next editor and publisher in 1875. The paper's purpose was to communicate with women of The Church of Jesus Christ of Latter-day Saints and to provide an accurate representation of Latter-day Saint women to the rest of America. The paper defended polygamy until the practice was renounced by President Wilford Woodruff in 1890. Women's rights was a continued topic in the Women's Exponent strongly in favor of equal pay and suffrage. When women were again denied the vote in 1879 Emmeline B. Wells changed the subtitle of the newspaper to "The Rights of the Women of Zion, and the Rights of the Women of all Nations" until 1897 when women regained the right to vote. After the enfranchisement of Utah women the subtitle was changed to "The Ballot in the Hands of the Women of Utah should be a Power to better the Home, the State and the Nation."

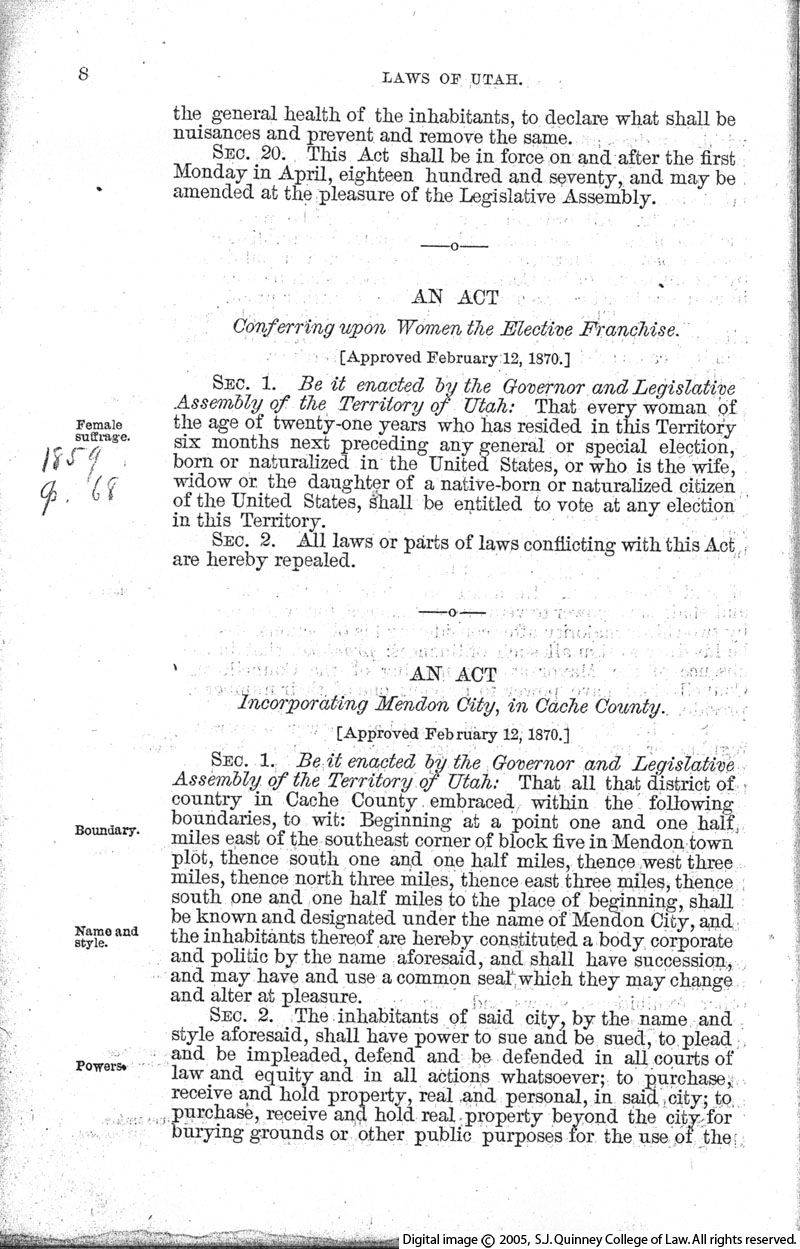
An Act Conferring upon Women the Elective Franchise, enacted February 12, 1870

Kimball was a member of the 1882 Utah State Constitutional Convention. By 1890, Kimball was the first president of the Utah Women's Suffrage Association and a leader in the national suffrage movement.

=== The Anti-Polygamy Standard ===
The Anti-Polygamy Standard was published in 1880 by Jennie Anderson Froiseth. The paper told the stories of women in polygamous marriages. It also provided more information on polygamy for the rest of the United States. The standard informed the public that woman suffrage was used by the members of The Church of Jesus Christ of Latter-day Saints to have an even larger majority over the non-members of the Territory. Although Jennie Anderson Froiseth believed strongly in rights for women she was concerned with the polygamous activity of the Latter-day Saints. She believed that Latter-day Saint women should not be allowed to vote until polygamy was outlawed. Froiseth published The Women of Mormonism; Or, the story of polygamy as told by the victims themselves during the three-year span of The Anti-Polygamy Standard. Froiseth's book told a different side of polygamy by the women manipulated and forced into polygamous marriages. She wanted women from all over the United States to know what was occurring to women in Utah Territory. She traveled around the United States giving lectures on the harm polygamy causes. Froiseth eventually became the vice president of the Utah Women's Suffrage Association in 1888.

=== Women's suffrage is revoked ===
One of the provisions of the Edmunds–Tucker Act in 1887 was the repeal of women's suffrage. The opposition of the majority of Utahans to this act was secured by a provision that required a test oath against polygamy. This was broad enough to include the majority of Latter-day Saints who were not directly involved in polygamy. All who would not swear this test oath were ineligible to vote, serve on juries, or hold most other government offices. Belva Lockwood represented the National Woman Suffrage Association in lobbying congress to defend Utah women's right to vote.

Emily S. Richards, in 1888, created the Utah suffrage association which was associated with the National Woman Suffrage Association. Richards, with the support of the LDS church, assigned major roles to Latter-day Saint women not involved in polygamous marriages. She organized subgroups of the association within the territory with many local units created by Relief Societies. The women of Utah wanted their suffrage back. However, the factions struggled to agree, The Church of Jesus Christ of Latter-day Saints and its offshoot the Godbe movement struggled for common ground. Both factions still had many members in polygamous marriages. Then another group of people living in Utah territory with nothing to do with the Latter-day Saint religion.

The Women's Exponent became the unofficial publication promoting suffrage within the territory.

As Utah Territory was working towards statehood, women pushed to become enfranchised again and have the ability to hold office. The topic was given to the Attorney-General. A test-case was brought to a judge in Ogden, H.W. Smith, who decided women should be able to vote. However, because the Edmunds–Tucker Act had not been repealed the Supreme Court of the territory rejected the lower court's decision. For women to become enfranchised the right to vote would have to be ratified in Utah's State Constitution.

== See also ==
- List of Utah suffragists
- Utah Women's Political Organizations
- Timeline of women's suffrage
- Timeline of women's suffrage in Utah
- Women's suffrage in states of the United States
- Martha Hughes Cannon
- Jennie Anderson Froiseth
- Emmeline B. Wells
- The Church of Jesus Christ of Latter-day Saints and politics in the United States
- Eurithe LaBarthe

== Bibliography ==
- Alexander, Thomas G. (Winter 1970). "An Experiment in Progressive Legislation: The Granting of Woman Suffrage in Utah in 1870". Utah Historical Quarterly. 38 (1): 20–30. doi:10.2307/45059139. JSTOR 45059139.
- Beeton, Beverly (Spring 1978). "Woman Suffrage in Territorial Utah". Utah Historical Quarterly. 46 (2): 100–120. doi:10.2307/45060584. JSTOR 45060584.
- Beeton, Beverly (1986). Women Vote in the West: The Woman Suffrage Movement, 1869-1896. New York: Garland Publishing. pp. 43–46. ISBN 978-0-8240-8251-2.
- Bennion, Sherilyn Cox (1990). Equal to the Occasion. Reno and Las Vegas: University of Nevada Press. ISBN 978-0-87417-163-1.
- Bennion, Sherilyn Cox (1976). The Woman's Exponent Forty-two years of speaking for women. Utah Historical Quarterly.
- Bickmore, Jean White (1994). Women's Suffrage in Utah. Utah History Encyclopedia.
- Clark, Rebekah Ryan (2005). "An Uncovered History: Mormons in the Woman Suffrage Movement, 1896–1920". In Madsen, Carol Cornwall; Silver, Cherry B. (eds.). New Scholarship on Latter-day Saint Women in the Twentieth Century: Selections from the Women's History Initiative Seminars, 2003–2004. Symposium Proceedings in Latter-day Saint History. Provo, Utah: Joseph Fielding Smith Institute for Latter-day Saint History. pp. 19–38. ISBN 978-0-8425-2630-2.
- Cresswell, Stephen (2002). Mormons and Cowboys, Moonshiners and Klansman: Federal Law Enforcement in the South and West, 1870-1893. University of Alabama Press. ISBN 978-0-8173-1186-5.
- "Defenders of Polygamy". Vol. 6, no. 68. Record of the times. 1879.
- Froiseth, Jennie Anderson (1880). "The Anti-polygamy standard". The Anti-Polygamy Standard (Vol. 1 – Vol. 3).
- Froiseth, Jennie Anderson (1886). The women of Mormonism Or, The story of polygamy as told by the victims themselves. C. G. G. Paine.
- Gordon, Sarah Barringer (1996). "The Liberty of Self-Degradation: Polygamy, Woman Suffrage, and Consent in Nineteenth-Century America". Journal of American History. 83 (3, Dec. 1996): 815–847. doi:10.2307/2945641. JSTOR 2945641.
- Madsen, Carol Cornwall, ed. (1997). Battle for the Ballot: Essays on Woman Suffrage in Utah, 1870–1896. Logan: Utah State University Press. ISBN 978-0-87421-222-8.
- "The Women to Vote in Utah". Elmira daily advertiser. 1870.
- Van Wagenen, Lola (1994). "Unity, Victory, Discord—The Struggle to Achieve Woman Suffrage". Beehive History. 20: 2–8.
- Van Wagenen, Lola (2003). Sister-Wives and Suffragists: Polygamy and the Politics of Woman Suffrage, 1870–1896. Dissertations in Latter-day Saint History. Provo, Utah: Joseph Fielding Smith Institute for Latter-day Saint History. ISBN 978-0-8425-2525-1.
- Walker, Ronald (1974). "Godbeites". Utah History Encyclopedia.
- White, Jean Bickmore (Fall 1974). "Woman's Place Is in the Constitution: The Struggle for Equal Rights in Utah in 1895". Utah Historical Quarterly. 42 (4): 344–69. doi:10.2307/45059469. JSTOR 45059469.
- White, Jean Bickmore (1994), "Women's Suffrage in Utah", in Powell, Allan Kent (ed.), Utah History Encyclopedia, Salt Lake City: University of Utah Press, ISBN 978-0-87480-425-6, OCLC 30473917, archived from the original on 2017-01-13
