= Charlotte Ives Cobb Godbe Kirby =

American activist and advocate (1836–1908)

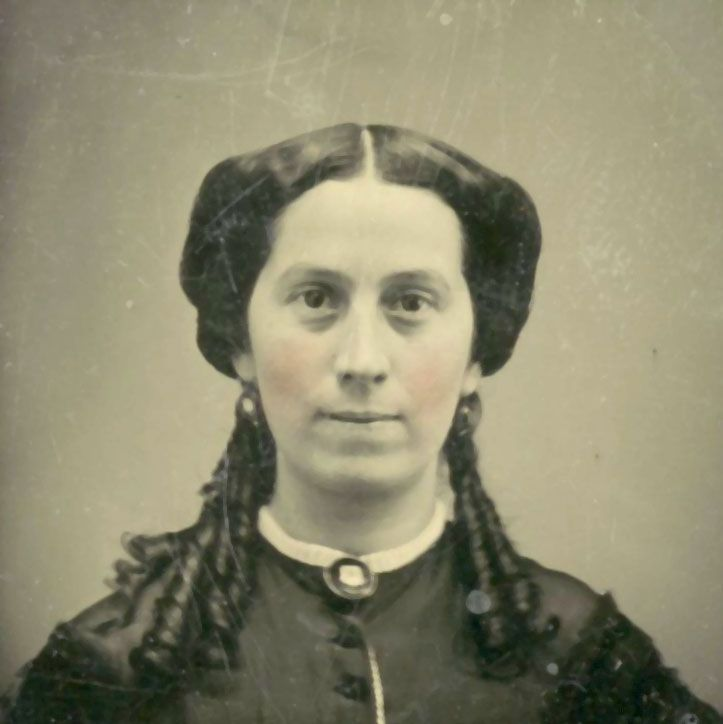
Charlotte Ives Cobb Kirby

Charlotte Ives Cobb Kirby (August 3, 1836 – January 24, 1908) was an influential and radical women's rights activist and temperance advocate in the state of Utah as well as a well-known national figure. Charlotte was born in Massachusetts and at seven years of age moved to Nauvoo, Illinois, with her mother, an early member of the Church of Jesus Christ of Latter-day Saints (LDS Church). There, without divorcing father Henry Cobb, her mother became Brigham Young's second plural wife. They then moved to Utah in 1848. Charlotte, previously a plural wife herself, spoke out against polygamy and gained much opposition from polygamous women suffragists because of it. Her first marriage was to William S. Godbe, the leader of the Godbeite offshoot from the LDS Church. After divorcing Godbe, Kirby married John Kirby, a non-LDS man, and they were together until Charlotte's death in 1908. Charlotte was a leading figure of the Utah Territory Woman Suffrage Association, and served as a correspondent to the government and other suffragist organizations, including the National Women's Suffrage Association. Charlotte often traveled to the East Coast to deliver lectures regarding women's rights and temperance, the first Utah woman and the first woman with voting rights to speak to national suffragist audiences. Charlotte Ives Cobb Kirby died on January 24, 1908, at age 71 in Salt Lake City, Utah.

== Women's Rights and Suffrage ==
=== Suffrage in Utah ===
After the enfranchisement of women in Wyoming in December 1869, the Utah territorial legislature granted Utah women the right to vote in 1870. Shortly before enacting enfranchisement, Salt Lake received reports that Congress threatened to disenfranchise the women of Utah because of the nationally unpopular practice of polygamy of the LDS Church, predominant in Utah. After being informed of these reports and anti-polygamist ideas, Territorial Secretary S. A. Mann signed the bill to enfranchise women in the territory of Utah on February 12, 1870. This enfranchisement raised national attention as it brought in forty times more eligible women than Wyoming did, the majority of women being members of the LDS Church. Congress as well as suffrage organizations like the National Woman Suffrage Association (NWSA) thought the enfranchisement in Utah would lead to women voting for the end of polygamy. On the other hand, LDS members expected women's suffrage to strengthen their religious traditions by empowering women during the practice of polygamy.

Utah petitioned for statehood through the 1880s. Congress denied Utah's petition for statehood, proposing instead to admit them if women were disenfranchised. Additionally, the Edmunds-Tucker Act stripped all Utah women of their voting rights because suffrage did not end polygamy. Suffragist Belva Ann Lockwood began campaigning that the fight was not only for “Mormon’ female votes” but for “woman’s equal rights in principle.” After this campaign, suffragists were accused of supporting polygamy. Suffragists such as Susan B. Anthony attempted to clarify their intentions of solely advocating women's suffrage, not polygamy, and continued fighting for the vote in the west. This association with polygamy tainted the public view of the national suffrage movement and its associations with LDS suffragists. Suffragists continued to fight for Utah's women's suffrage and many visited Utah in 1895. Leading the Rocky Mountain Suffrage Conference held in Salt Lake City, Susan B. Anthony and Anna Howard Shaw aided in the formation of a suffrage association in Utah called the Utah Territory Woman Suffrage Association as many Utah men wanted to abandon women's suffrage in order to obtain statehood.

=== Kirby's Role in Suffrage ===
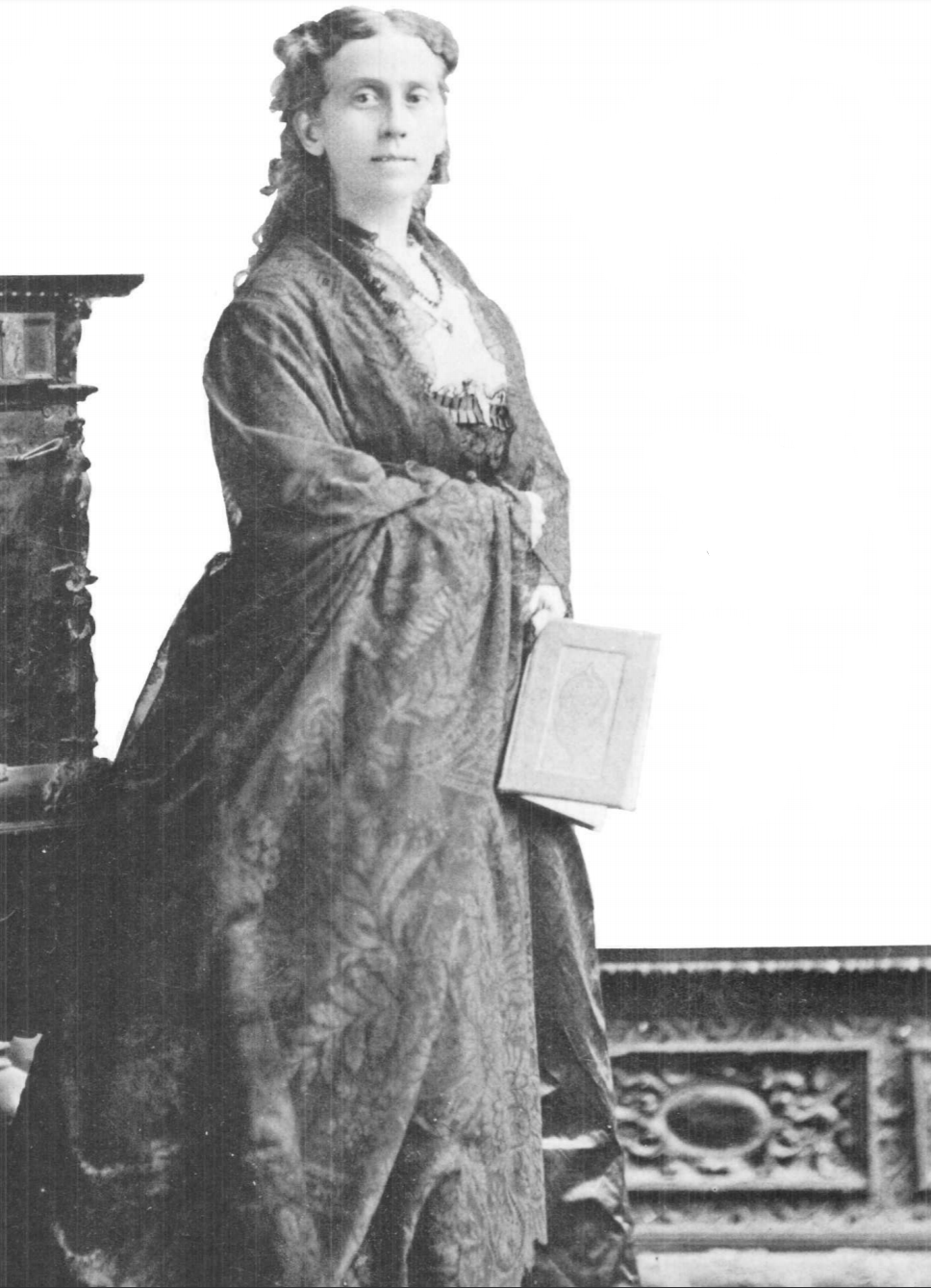

As the Utah territorial legislature proposed a state constitution that made polygamy illegal and did not include women's right to vote, radical suffragists took a stand against this. Charlotte Ives Cobb Kirby was one of those influential Utah feminists that fought for women's suffrage in Utah. Charlotte's dedication to the suffrage movement was inspired by her mother, Augusta Adams Cobb. Charlotte explained in a letter to Wilford Woodruff in 1889 that in Boston, Augusta had been close friends with suffragist Lucy Stone, and that Charlotte had maintained that friendship. On her deathbed, Augusta made Charlotte promise that she would continue the work of woman suffrage.

She fulfilled her mother's wish. During the 1870s, Charlotte became very involved in the Woman's Suffrage Movement. On a visit east in 1871 with her first husband, she appeared at a suffrage meeting in Providence, Rhode Island. In May 1871, she was made the Utah delegate to the National Woman's Suffrage Educational Committee of the United States. In July 1871, Elizabeth Cady Stanton and Susan B. Anthony of NWSA visited Utah at the invitation of the Godbeites. Charlotte and Godbe met the suffragists at the train station and hosted their stay in Utah. Stanton and Anthony were also invited by Brigham Young to speak to women at the Mormon Tabernacle. After speaking at the Tabernacle, they spoke to the Godbeites at their newly dedicated Liberal Institute, and then to the Godbeite women, the Ladies Mututal Improvement Society. After their visit, Charlotte maintained close ties with these suffragists and the national suffrage movement.

Charlotte was a prominent figure in the Utah Territory Woman Suffrage Association by writing articles and corresponding with other suffragists and local and national governments. Although they did not get along, Charlotte worked alongside Utah suffragist Emmeline B. Wells in the Utah Territory Woman Suffrage Association; they debated the statehood proposal that would deny women their voting rights in Utah. Emmeline, however, was often skeptical of Charlotte. She was polygamous and advocated for that practice and woman suffrage simultaneously. She expressed her feelings that Charlotte could not be a representative for the women in Utah because she did not advocate for polygamy or the LDS Church before woman's suffrage. In other words, Wells saw women's suffrage as a means for improving the general public's perceptions of Mormon women and the LDS Church, while Charlotte saw women's suffrage as a separate issue from the LDS Church.

While Charlotte played an active role in the national women's suffrage movement, she also advocated for the national temperance movement. She consistently traveled to the East Coast to deliver lectures on temperance and women's suffrage. The Salt Lake Herald-Republican newspaper shared the success Charlotte had giving a lecture on temperance in New York on March 14, 1881. She promoted the Temperance Club of Salt Lake City, which a Mr. Bradley served as president. Along with other LDS members, she sought to work with people of other religions to advance the temperance movement.

== Personal life ==
=== Early years ===
Charlotte Ives Cobb (nicknamed "Lottie") was born in 1837 in Boston, Massachusetts, to Henry Cobb and Augusta Adams Cobb. Augusta listened to an LDS (Mormon) leader preach in Boston and converted to the Church of Jesus Christ of Latter-day Saints despite her husband's disapproval; after many years of practicing her religion secretly, Augusta left her husband and five of her children in the 1840s to join the LDS community in Nauvoo, Illinois. Augusta took two of her children with her; six-year old Charlotte Ives and Brigham. Brigham Cobb died shortly after the journey. In Nauvoo, Augusta married Brigham Young as one of his first plural wives and was sealed (part of the marriage ceremony of the LDS Church) for eternity in the Mormon temple. Charlotte was brought up as Young's daughter and described Young as being affectionate and concerned with her education. In 1848, Augusta and Charlotte traveled to Utah, but they always maintained their social ties to family and friends in the East. Augusta later requested to have her eternal sealing to Young cancelled so that she could be sealed to the deceased Joseph Smith, while still remaining sealed and married to Young. Young complied and stood proxy as Joseph Smith for this sealing. Despite this change in her mother's relationship, Young remained the effective father of Charlotte.

=== Marriages ===
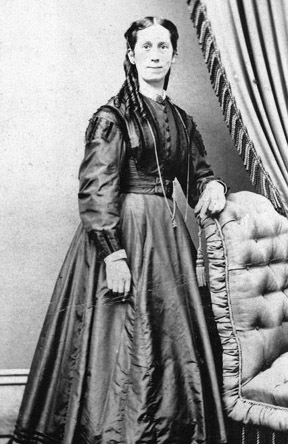

==== William S. Godbe ====
In April 1869, Charlotte was married to William S. Godbe as his fourth wife, and Brigham Young performed the sealing ceremony. In the fall of 1869, Godbe was excommunicated from the LDS church, along with Elias L. T. Harrison, for his criticisms of Brigham Young's economic policies and his adoption of spiritualism. After his excommunication, Godbe and his followers, including Thomas B. Stenhouse and Edward Tullidge, started the Church of Zion, a group often referred to as the Godbeites.

The Godbeites were known for their liberal economic and social views and their help in forming the Liberal Party of Utah. Notably, they were helpful in creating a relationship with Eastern suffragists Susan B. Anthony and Elizabeth Cady Stanton; when these two women came to visit Utah for the first time in 1871, it was at the invitation of the Godbeites. Charlotte and William Godbe met them at the train station and Godbe opened his home for them to stay at while in Utah.

While Charlotte's relationship with these and other Eastern suffragists continued, her marriage to Godbe did not. After publicly denouncing polygamy in July 1871, Godbe slowly divorced all of his wives except for the first. Charlotte and Godbe separated in 1873, but their divorce was not finalized until 1879. Out of Godbe's four wives, Charlotte was the only one who did not leave the LDS church after Godbe's excommunication. After distancing herself from Godbe and polygamy, she established a better relationship with national suffrage organizations.

==== John Kirby ====
In 1884, Charlotte remarried a man named John Kirby. Twenty years her junior, Kirby was a wealthy mine owner and was not a member of the LDS church. Charlotte remained married to Kirby for the rest of her life, living in Salt Lake City, Utah.

=== Later life ===
Charlotte Ives Cobb Kirby died at age 71 on January 24, 1908, in Salt Lake City, Utah.
