= John Tanner (Mormon) =

Early Latter-Day Saint from Rhode Island (1778–1850)

John Tanner (August 15, 1778 – April 13, 1850) was a leading figure in The Church of Jesus Christ of Latter-day Saints and a chief financial backer of the Kirtland Temple.

Tanner was a native of Rhode Island. He moved to New York when fairly young. Of his 21 children from three successive wives (his first two wives died before he married his next wife), 14 lived to adulthood. Tanner was a Baptist until he joined the Church of Jesus Christ of Latter-day Saints in 1832. He was baptized by Jared Carter. Ten of his 14 children who lived to adulthood affiliated with the Church of Jesus Christ of Latter-day Saints and eventually moved to Utah Territory.

In late 1834, Tanner sold his property in and around Lake George, New York which included a hotel. He then moved to Kirtland, Ohio where in early 1835 he lent money and assumed loans to keep the building of the Kirtland Temple moving forward. When Joseph Smith tried to repay him he refused any payment saying they owed him nothing.

Tanner moved with the main body of the Church to Missouri, where he was on one occasion attacked as a result of mob and government persecution that led to the Saints fleeing the state. He then moved to Montrose, Iowa where he lived for six years. He then moved for a time to Nauvoo, Illinois.

Tanner eventually went west with the pioneers. He led the large family of his son-in-law Amasa Lyman west, since Lyman was in the advanced pioneer company. Two of Tanner's sons were in the Mormon Battalion. He settled in Cottonwood, Utah Territory where he died in 1850.

== Legacy and descendants ==
T. C. Christensen produced a short film based on Tanner's life, Treasure in Heaven: The John Tanner Story.

Children

Sidney Tanner was involved in the Battle of Crooked River. He then lived in Montrose. His wife and the three youngest of his five children all died at the time that they joined the body of the Mormons in heading west. He later served on the city council and the Mormon high council in San Bernardino, California. In 1857 he moved to Utah, eventually settling in Beaver. He practiced plural marriage and had 22 children.

John Joshua Tanner and Nathan Tanner were part of Zion's Camp.

Louisa Maria Tanner married Amasa M. Lyman.

Albert Tanner and Myron Tanner were in the Mormon Battalion.

Other descendants

Among Tanner's grandchildren were Joseph M. Tanner and Francis M. Lyman (the son of his daughter Louisa Maria). His granddaughter Emily S. Tanner Richards was one of the main founders of the Utah Woman's Suffrage Association.

Other prominent later descendants of John Tanner were Hugh B. Brown and N. Eldon Tanner, members of the First Presidency of the LDS Church, Ronald M. Tanner product manager in charge of the creation of FamilySearch FamilyTree, and several companion features & products, and John S. Tanner, a poet, literary scholar and academic vice president at Brigham Young University. Ethnobotanist and prominent Latter-day Saint conservationist Paul Alan Cox is also a descendant of John Tanner. Radio talk show personality Martin Tanner, host of the Religion Today show on KSL Radio, a frequent defender of Mormonism, is a great-great-great-grandson of John Tanner. Jerald Tanner, a prominent critic of Mormonism, was John Tanner's great-great-grandson.
