= Franklin S. Richards =

American politician (1849–1934)

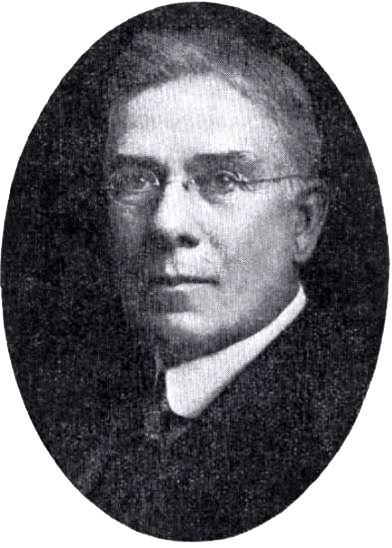

Member of the Council of Fifty of The Church of Jesus Christ of Latter-day Saints
- April 10, 1880 – September 4, 1934
- Called by: John Taylor

Personal details
- Born: Franklin Snyder Richards; June 20, 1849; Salt Lake City, Provisional State of Deseret, United States
- Died: September 4, 1934 (aged 85); Salt Lake City, Utah, United States
- Resting place: Salt Lake City Cemetery; 40.777°N 111.858°W

Franklin Snyder Richards (June 20, 1849 – September 4, 1934) was the general counsel for the Church of Jesus Christ of Latter-day Saints (LDS Church) in the late-19th and early-20th century. He was closely connected with the defense against charges of polygamy of many leading LDS Church figures.

== Biography ==
Richards was born in Salt Lake City in 1849. He was the son of Franklin D. Richards, one of the members of the Quorum of the Twelve Apostles, and Jane Snyder. From 1866 to 1868, Richards was a school teacher in Salt Lake City. In 1868, he married Emily S. Tanner.

In 1869, Richards moved to Ogden, Utah Territory. He became the clerk of the probate court there and undertook the study of law. Richards passed the bar in 1874. In 1877, he went to Great Britain as a missionary for the LDS Church. He was then retained by the LDS Church in 1879 to represent its interests in the settling of Brigham Young's estate. Richards remained the general counsel for the LDS Church until his death in 1934.

In 1889, Richards sought to convince U.S. President Benjamin Harrison and James G. Blaine to appoint officers in Utah Territory who were non-vindictive towards the Mormons. Richards formed a law firm in 1879 with Rufus K. Williams, who had been chief justice of the Kentucky Supreme Court. They served as the primary legal counsel that sought to prevent the removal of suffrage from the women of Utah Territory in 1880.

Richards's wife, Emily S. Richards, was one of the main figures behind the founding of the Utah Women's Suffrage Association in 1889.

Richards was a member of the 1882 Utah State Constitutional Convention and was one of the delegates sent to seek the approval of the State Constitution in Washington, D.C. In 1884, Richards was elected to the Council (roughly equivalent to a State Senate) of the Utah Territorial Legislature, for the district encompassing Weber County and Box Elder County. Richards replaced Lorenzo Snow, who had served in the seat since 1854. Richards served one term in this position. Richards was a member of the 1895 Utah State Constitutional Convention, which was successful in gaining statehood for Utah.

Among other cases, Richards was the legal counsel for Lorenzo Snow in his case before the United States Supreme Court, in which a complex scheme was overturned which would have given polygamous Mormon men essentially life sentences for unlawful cohabitation under the Edmunds Act.

At various times, Richards served as city attorney for both Ogden and Salt Lake City. He was also the prosecuting attorney for Weber County.

The J. Reuben Clark Law Society has an award named after Richards.
