= Margaret Caine =

Margaret Ann Nightingale Caine
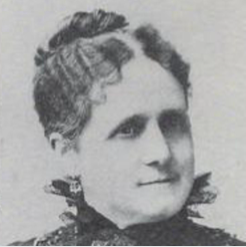

Personal details
- Born: December 8, 1833; Lancashire, England
- Died: July 16, 1911 (aged 77); Salt Lake City, Utah
- Occupation: Politician

Margaret Ann Nightingale Caine was the first president of the Utah Women Suffrage Association, a secretary of Salt Lake Stake Relief Society, and the elected auditor of Salt Lake County, Utah from 1897 to 1898.

== Biography ==
Margaret Nightingale Caine was born in Lancashire, England, on December 8, 1833, to Henry Nightingale and Agnes Leach. She was the niece of Florence Nightingale. Her grandmother, Mary Leach, was the second person to be baptized into the Church of Jesus Christ of Latter-day Saints in Europe, and her children and grandchildren soon followed. Caine's family immigrated to the United States of America in 1841, and then Nauvoo, Illinois. She moved to Missouri, where she met and married John T. Caine, with whom she would have 13 children. After the assassination of Joseph Smith, she and her husband joined the James McGaw Company and emigrated to Utah Territory with many other members. They settled in the newly formed Salt Lake City. Her husband, John T. Caine, was elected to the House of Representatives for Utah, placing the family within the public sphere. John was ostracized within the House for his support of polygamy, which he did not practice, leading Caine and her husband to oppose the Edmunds-Tucker Act of 1887. Caine was unanimously elected president of the Utah Woman Suffrage Association in 1889 She died on July 16, 1911, of "general debility", at the age of 77.
