= Jennie Anderson Froiseth =

Founder of literary club, and anti-polygamy crusader

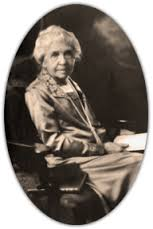
- Jennie Anderson Froiseth, taken in the 1910s
- Born: Jennie Anderson; December 6, 1849; Ireland
- Died: February 7, 1930 (aged 80)
- Occupations: Anti-Polygamist, Suffragist
- Spouse: Bernard Arnold Martin Froiseth (m. 1871–1922) his death
- Parents: Finley Anderson (father); Sarah Strong Anderson (mother)

Jennie Anderson Froiseth (December 6, 1849 – February 7, 1930) was the founder of the Blue Tea, a literary club for women who were not Mormon in Utah Territory. The Blue Tea would later change its name to the Ladies Literary Club. She was an anti-polygamy crusader who helped form and was the vice president of the Anti-Polygamy Society of Utah. Froiseth published the Anti-Polygamy Standard which lasted three years and later edited The Women of Mormonism, a book which described in detail the experiences of some Mormon women inside polygamous marriages. She believed strongly in women's rights and played a role in bringing enfranchisement to Utah Territory, later she became the vice president of the Utah Women's Suffrage Association. Although a strong supporter of female suffrage, she believed Mormon women should not have the right to vote until polygamy was eradicated.

== Early life ==
Born in Ireland, Froiseth came to the United States with her family and lived in New York. In 1866, Froiseth traveled to Europe with her father, Colonel Finley Anderson, and her mother, Sarah Strong Anderson. During the five years Froiseth spent abroad studying in Europe, authors Charles Dickens, Robert Browning, and William Makepeace Thackeray were guests of the Anderson home. After returning to the United States in 1870, she traveled to the Utah Territory with Finley, who was on special assignment for the New York Herald in the West. In Utah, they resided at Fort Douglas, where she met Bernard Arnold Martin Froiseth. Bernard and Jennie were married in the Holy Trinity Church in Brooklyn, New York, on June 8, 1871. Bernard was an army surveyor assigned to the Utah Territory, and soon after their wedding they returned to the West.

== The Blue Tea ==
In the late 19th century, Utah Territory was heavily populated by Mormons and dominated religiously and politically by the Church of Jesus Christ of Latter-day Saints (LDS church). The church held great sway over Mormon voters and people outside of the LDS church had very little political representation. Non-Mormons (at the time called "Gentiles") were effectively segregated; for example a non-Mormon woman had few ways to meet other women, whereas the women of the LDS Church could build friendships at the Relief Society. Froiseth struggled with the lack of social engagement. During a visit to family and friends back in New York City in 1875, Froiseth attended the Sorosis Women's club with her sister Julia. The experience Froiseth had at the club motivated her to form a literary club called the Blue Tea in Salt Lake City. It was Utah's first women's club. As the Blue Tea's first president, Froiseth set a cap of 25 members in 1876. The Blue Tea discussed many topics for the purpose of stimulating "mental culture" within its members. A few women would be assigned to read a book or article and come back the next week to expound on the ideas they read so the club could debate those ideas. Froiseth described the Blue Tea's first year: "we did good work, had some fine programmes, necessitating not a little reading and study, and the meetings went so well that there was rarely a vacant chair". Froiseth's club gave non-Mormon women the chance to socialize but also empowered them to push for change within their society. The minutes for the Blue Tea can be found in the Special Collections of the Marriott Library, University of Utah.

== Anti-polygamy movement ==
=== The Anti-Polygamy Society ===
The Carrie Owen case moved Froiseth and other members of the Blue Tea to protest at Independence Hall in Salt Lake City on November 7, 1878. That same day, the women of the protest organized the Ladies' Anti-Polygamy Society of Utah; Sarah Anne Cooke was named president with Froiseth as vice president. The society's purpose "was not to wage war against any party, sect, or person, but...to fight to the death that system which so enslaves and degrades our sex, and which robs them of so much happiness". In August 1880 the Women's National Anti-Polygamy Society was founded, and Froiseth toured the country to give lectures on polygamy and to set-up Anti-Polygamy chapters. The Anti-Polygamy Society of Utah later would develop into the Utah Association for the Advancement of Women.

=== The Anti-Polygamy Standard ===
Froiseth's passionate opposition to polygamy led her to edit and publish The Anti-Polygamy Standard in 1880. The eight-page monthly paper has the same biblical verse printed on every issue, "Let every man have his own wife, and let every women have her own husband" (1 Corinthians 7:2). The Standard told the stories of women suffering in polygamous marriages and further educated the country on polygamy in the Utah Territory. The Anti-Polygamy Standard only lasted three years, ending abruptly in 1883 due to lack of funding. During the newspaper's life Froiseth compiled the stories of suffering women in polygamous marriages in order to publish The Women of Mormonism: Or, The story of polygamy as told by the victims themselves. The book focuses on the misery and distress felt by wives subjected to polygamy. One reverend wrote, "I have read some of the proof sheets of The Women of Mormonism. If the statements made are true—and they are amply vouched for by intelligent and trustworthy persons—they will certainly stir the blood of those who read them." Froiseth wanted women from all over the United States to know what was happening in Utah Territory.

=== Suffragist movement ===
Utah held intensely liberal views of women's suffrage and also a strong dedication to polygamy. To the people in the East, women's suffrage was seen as the opposite of polygamy. For many, the two ideals could not coincide because polygamy was seen as oppressive to women. Hamilton Wilcox, a New York suffragist (1867–1868), suggested women's suffrage should be experimented with in the territories. People on the east coast were heavily motivated to push women's enfranchisement in Utah Territory, believing it would put an end to polygamy. By 1870, the idea became so popular and supported in the East that Utah territorial legislature began debate over the right of women to vote. On February 10, 1869, after two weeks of debate, a unanimous vote passed a bill enfranchising the women of Utah, fifty years before the Nineteenth Amendment to the United States Constitution guaranteed women nationwide the right to vote. However, instead of voting against plural marriage, Mormon women helped double the majority in favor of plural marriage by reelecting William H. Hooper, who defended polygamy. Froiseth, a long time believer in the enfranchisement of women and later the vice president of the Utah Women's Suffrage Association (1888), firmly believed Mormon women should not have the right to vote—at least until polygamy was outlawed. She recognized this was inconsistent with her beliefs about women's rights but concluded, by her own judgement, that Mormon women were too heavily influenced to make voting decisions for themselves.

== Later years ==
The anti-polygamy Edmunds–Tucker Act passed in 1887, nine years after the organization of The Anti-Polygamy Society. In 1911, Froiseth organized a retirement home for women. She purchased the property and oversaw the architectural plans. The building was named the Sarah Daft Home and 100 years later it was still running as a retirement center. Froiseth became the president of the Sarah Daft Home and also worked with the Orphan's Home and Day Nursery. In her later years, Froiseth was an active member of the Poetry Society and served as its president. Froiseth's daughters, Ethylene and Dorothy, became members of the all-encompassing Ladies Literary Club, which took the place of the exclusive Blue Tea. As Froiseth put it, "the larger scope of the Ladies Literary Club" had discontinued the Blue Tea. Both of her daughters served for a time as president of the Ladies Literary Club.

Froiseth's husband Bernard died on November 5, 1922. After living as a widow for eight years, Jennie Anderson Froiseth died at the age of 80 on February 7, 1930, 40 years after polygamy publicly ended. She had five children: Bernard Froiseth, R.J. Froiseth, R.E. Froiseth, Ethylene Perkins, and Dorothy Bracken.
