= Ladies Literary Club Clubhouse =

Historic building in Salt Lake City, Utah, U.S.

- U.S. National Register of Historic Places
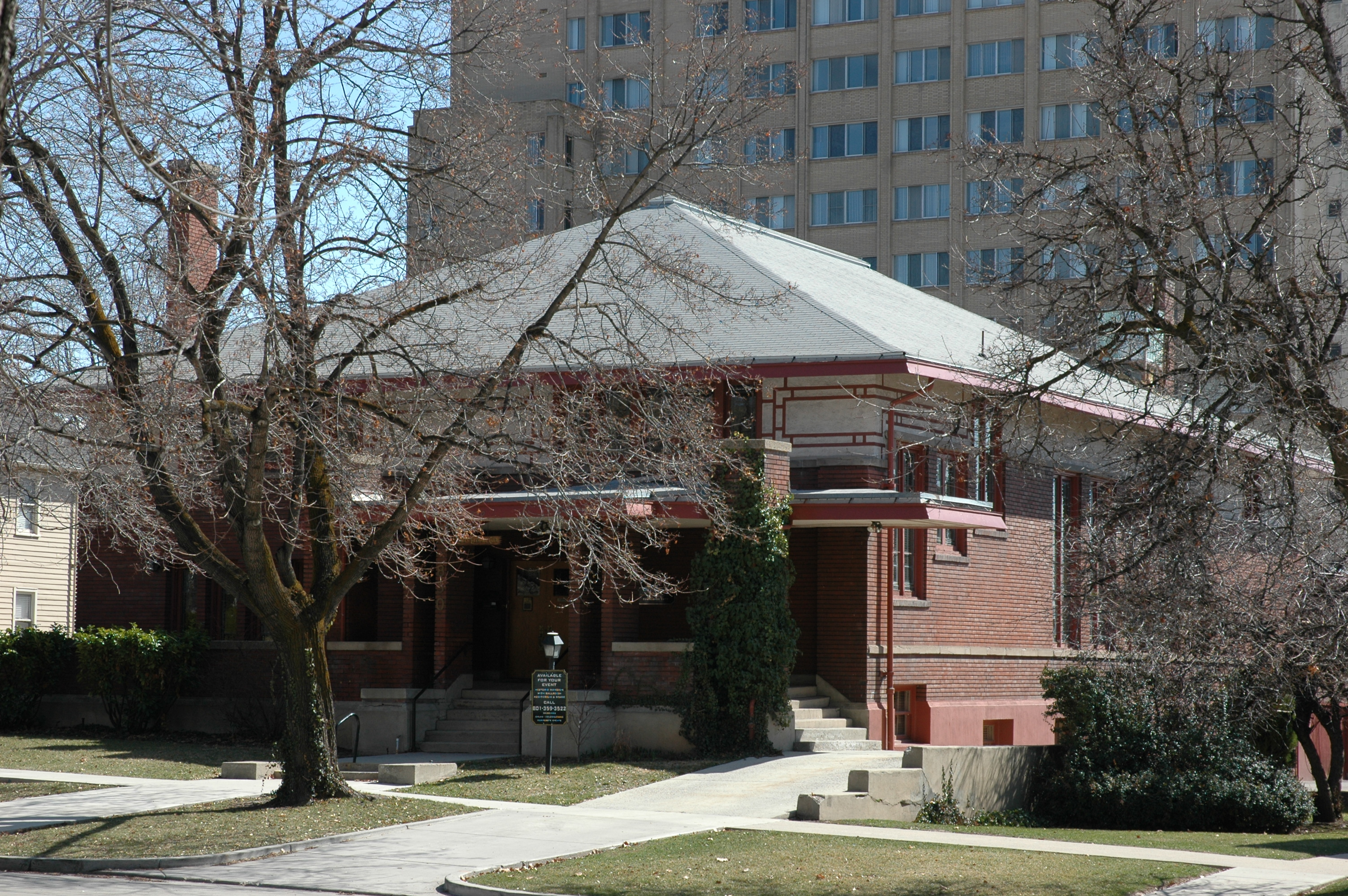

- Location within Utah Location within the United States
- Location: 850 E. South Temple St., Salt Lake City, Utah
- Coordinates: 40°46′10″N 111°51′58″W
- Area: less than one acre
- Built: 1913
- Architect: Treganza & Ware
- Architectural style: Prairie School
- NRHP reference No.: 78002675
- Added to NRHP: October 11, 1978

The Ladies Literary Club Clubhouse, at 850 East South Temple St. in Salt Lake City, Utah, was built in 1913. It was designed by architects Treganza & Ware in Prairie School style.

The club was founded in 1877 and is the oldest women's club in the United States west of the Mississippi River. It is the successor to the Blue Tea literary club founded in 1876 by Jennie Anderson Froiseth.

Its first president was Mrs. Eliza Kirtley Royle, whose 1875-built home is also NRHP-listed.

The Clubhouse was listed on the National Register of Historic Places in 1978.

In 2013, the 'Ladies' donated the building to the Utah Heritage Foundation, a non-profit whose mission is to preserve, protect and promote Utah's historic built environment. UHF accepted the stewardship with plans to renovate the property and use it as a community event center. The foundation ran the Ladies Literary Club for public use for two years before listing it for sale or lease in 2015, hosting hundreds of cultural, performing, and private events that exposed several thousand new people to this architectural landmark.

On April 22, 2016, that cultural legacy continued as the Utah Heritage Foundation sold the property to Photo Collective Studios, of Salt Lake City-a group of millennial visual artists and entrepreneurs, led by Dave Brewer. Terms of the sale were not disclosed, but a Preservation Easement, was recorded to protect the historic character of the building's unique interior and exterior.

Utah Heritage Foundation's board of trustees decided to seek a new steward for the building and it was listed for lease or sale in January 2015. Several proposals for reusing the building were considered, with the proposal submission by Photo Collective Studios being selected as the majority favorite. “Photo Collective Studios presented us with an inspiring story and have a passion for preserving the arts and creativity of Salt Lake City,” stated Janis Bennion, Chair of the Board of Trustees. “We believe their passion extends to the preservation of architecture and the stories that lay in these places as well,” said Kirk Huffaker, Executive Director for Utah Heritage Foundation. “Given their business focus and connection with the creative community, their stewardship of the Ladies’ Literary Club presented a unique opportunity to foster an ongoing collaboration that allows the building to be utilized and accessed by the public, and to continue the legacy and ideals of the Ladies’ Literary Club for cultural enrichment.”

After renovations to the Ladies Literary Club, the directors pay tribute to its past by renaming the historic venue the "Clubhouse".

April-October 2016, Clubhouse underwent minor and major renovations including refinishing original hardwood floors throughout.

On January 28, 2026, in recognition of its contribution to preserving and activating Utah’s cultural heritage, Clubhouse owner and historic preservation steward Dave Brewer received an Outstanding Achievement Award from the Utah Division of State History. The award honors projects that demonstrate excellence in historic preservation, public history, and community engagement across the state.
