= Utah women's political organizations =

Overview of women's political organizations in Utah

Since the beginning of political activity in Utah, women were highly involved in their local political system. This is reflected in the fact that the Utah Constitution granted women the right to vote 20 years before the 19th Amendment to the U.S. Constitution was passed nationally. Despite high levels of female participation in politics and government, the issue of women's suffrage saw both support by Utah women and opposition by many other Utah women.

== Women's political clubs ==
=== The League of Women Voters of Salt Lake City ===
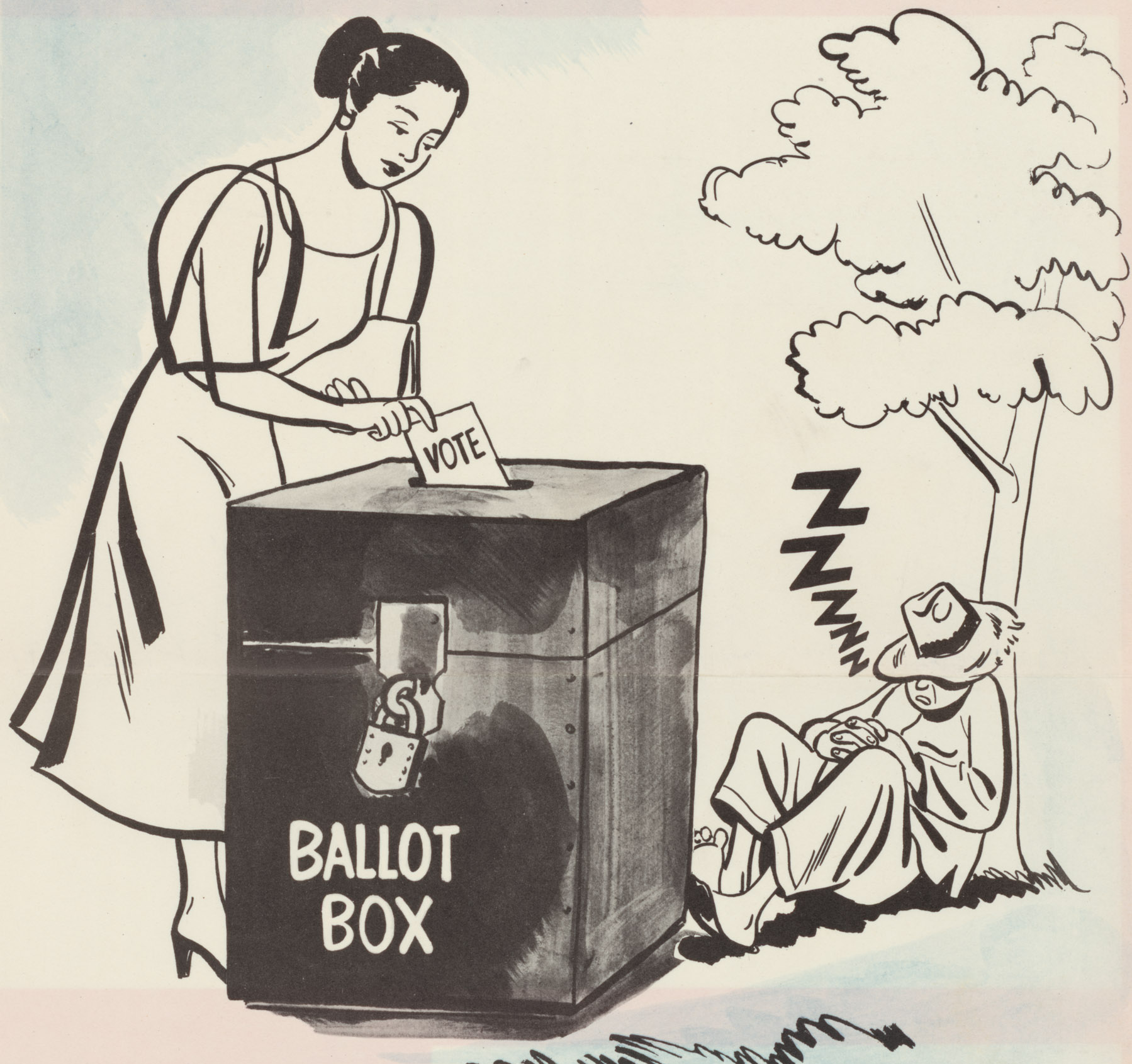

The League of Women Voters of Salt Lake City is a local branch of The League of Women Voters, a bipartisan political organization. This group's current aims are as follows: ensure voter access, mobilize voters, ensure voter education, promote transparency and accountability in government.

In the early-to-mid 1900s, the league was extensively involved in improving the infrastructure and environmental health of Salt Lake City, two major concerns of inhabitants of the region at that time. The league published several booklets of information pertaining to this work, including data from commissioned scientists ran regarding what was needed to improve local infrastructure and the environment, as well as the results of the work done, which were favorable.

Another objective of The League of Women Voters of Salt Lake City was to amend the state of public schools in the area. The booklet containing this information, as did first, relied on scientific data to buttress their claims about how increasing the allocation of funds to local public schools would improve the state of local elementary education.

=== Utah Woman's Suffrage Association ===
The Utah Woman's Suffrage Association was an affiliate of the National American Woman Suffrage Association, another bipartisan political organization. It was founded by Susan B. Anthony.

Members of the association included prominent female political participants of the time, including Dr. Martha Hughes Cannon, the first female state senator and Emmeline B. Wells, a suffragist activist.

==== Emmeline B. Wells, suffragist ====
Emmeline B. Wells was born in 1829 in Petersham, Massachusetts. From 1877 to 1914, Wells was the editor of the Woman's Exponent, a popular Mormon women's magazine printed out of Salt Lake City, Utah. Wells began expressing her support for the woman's suffrage movement and for females in governmental positions to a public audience in her writings for the Woman's Exponent under a pen name. Having been one of the first women to vote when Utah Women were first granted suffrage, Wells worked on a national level to garner support for woman's suffrage by sending large petitions to the United States capital at Washington D.C. At the requests of Elizabeth Cady Stanton and Susan B. Anthony, Wells represented Utah and spoke at the 1879 National Woman's Suffrage Association convention in Washington. Near the end of her life, in 1910, Wells became the General President of the Relief Society of The Church of Jesus Christ of Latter-day Saints, holding that position of service for 11 years.

=== Women's Republican Club of Salt Lake City ===
The Women's Republican Club of Salt Lake City is a branch of the National Federation of Republican Women (NFRW). The club was organized in 1899 and was formally incorporated in 1903.

=== Women's Democratic Club of Utah ===
The Women's Democratic Club of Utah (WDC) officially began in 1896 and claims to have been founded by women who assisted in the drafting of the Utah State Constitution. Catherine Voutaz, is the President for the 2024 - 2026 term. "The Purpose of the organization shall be to: Encourage women to seek public office; Support progressive Democrats seeking elective office; Provide a forum for vigorous discussion of key issue; Advocate balanced, open, and accountable government; Work for equal rights and equal protections under law for all"

== Women in office ==
=== Dr. Martha Hughes Cannon ===
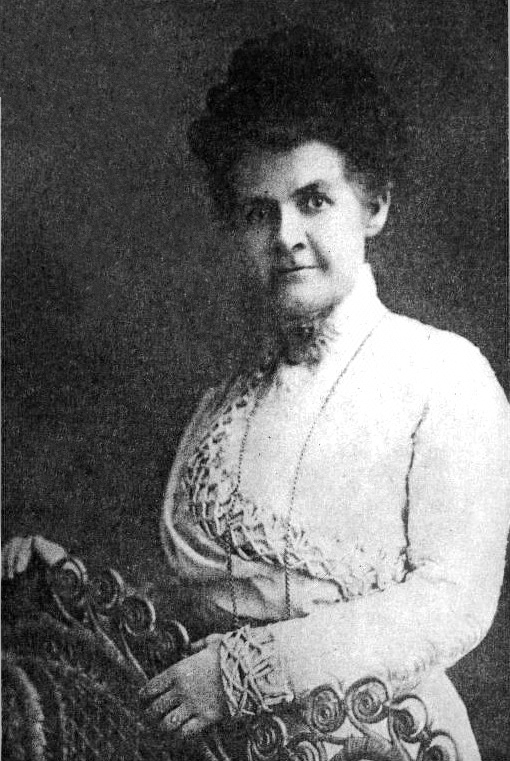
Dr. Martha Hughes Cannon

Born in 1857, Dr. Martha Hughes Cannon was the first female state senator. She was elected to the Utah State legislature as a Democrat in 1896, the year the United States Federal Government gave the women of Utah the right to vote. Cannon immigrated with her family to Utah from Wales as Latter-Day Saints. She achieved a chemistry degree at the University of Deseret, now University of Utah, and a medical degree at the University of Michigan in 1881 and a degree in pharmaceuticals at the University of Pennsylvania in 1882. At the National School of Elocution and Oratory in Philadelphia, she earned a degree for her public speaking skill. In Salt Lake City, she was the resident physician at Deseret Hospital and became involved in the woman suffrage movement before being elected to the Utah State Legislature. In her time on the legislature, Cannon championed for women to balance home life and life in the public sphere, and presented several bills having to do with public health.

=== Lora Loretta Woodland Tanner ===
Born June 10, 1857, Lora Tanner was a member of the Utah State Legislator from 1927-1928 and 1931-1932. Having studied at Brigham Young College, Logan, she became the first female graduate of the college in 1887 and went on to pursue her continued education at Brigham Young University and the University of Utah. As a state legislator, she was the chairman for the House Steering Committee and sponsor for the Kindergarten Bill. She was a member and leader in several female and co-ed political organizations in the Salt Lake City Area, including the Women's Civic Center, The Utah Congress of PTA's (member for 20 years and president from 1919 to 1922), Republican Women for the Payson Celebration (president for the occasion of Utah being granted statehood), the City Recreation Committee, the Health and Education Committee, the Child Welfare Committee of the City Council Defense Committee, Utah Pioneers Central Camp Vice President, and on a national level she was a member of the Herbert Hoover National Food Distribution Relief Committee. Her husband, Henry Smith Tanner was Salt Lake City, Utah's first state judge. She was remembered as an "ex-teacher, woman legislator" in her obituary.

== Notable events ==
=== International Women's Year Conference ===
The International Women's Year Conference (IWY) was held in the summer of 1977, every U.S. state held a conference to discuss Women's rights. Utah's conference was the largest, with over 8,000 more women in attendance than the second biggest assembly in California. The conference was only expecting a couple thousand people to show up, but were inundated with over 14,000 women. The equal rights amendment (ERA) was the main topic for the conferences across the nation. The ERA "proposed equality of rights under the law regardless of sex". It had been passed by both the House of Representatives and the Senate, and only needed three more states to be ratified into the United States Constitution. The Church of Jesus Christ of Latter Day Saints called for ten women from every congregation across the state to attend and vote against the amendment. The women, who were more than ninety percent Latter Day Saint, overwhelmingly voted against it. A small political group, Mormons for ERA, only had around 1000 members throughout the country and did not in any way measure up to the rest of the LDS population. These events ultimately caused the failure of the ratification of the equal rights amendment in 1982.

== Regional context ==
=== The Church of Jesus Christ of Latter-Day Saints ===
Latter Day Saint Women are most commonly responsible for community and home care. In the 19th and 20th centuries, LDS women were directly taught that their work was in the home, caring for children and their husbands, as well as helping in their children's schools and in church "callings" (a specific job or responsibility given to a member of the church). These women were not expected to participate in state politics, so they started PTA's (Parent Teacher Association) for schools and were the voice for change in their smaller communities. Many women though, went to school, got professional jobs or ran for office and became voices for Utah Women. Eventually, women were better represented in state legislators in Utah than in any other state.

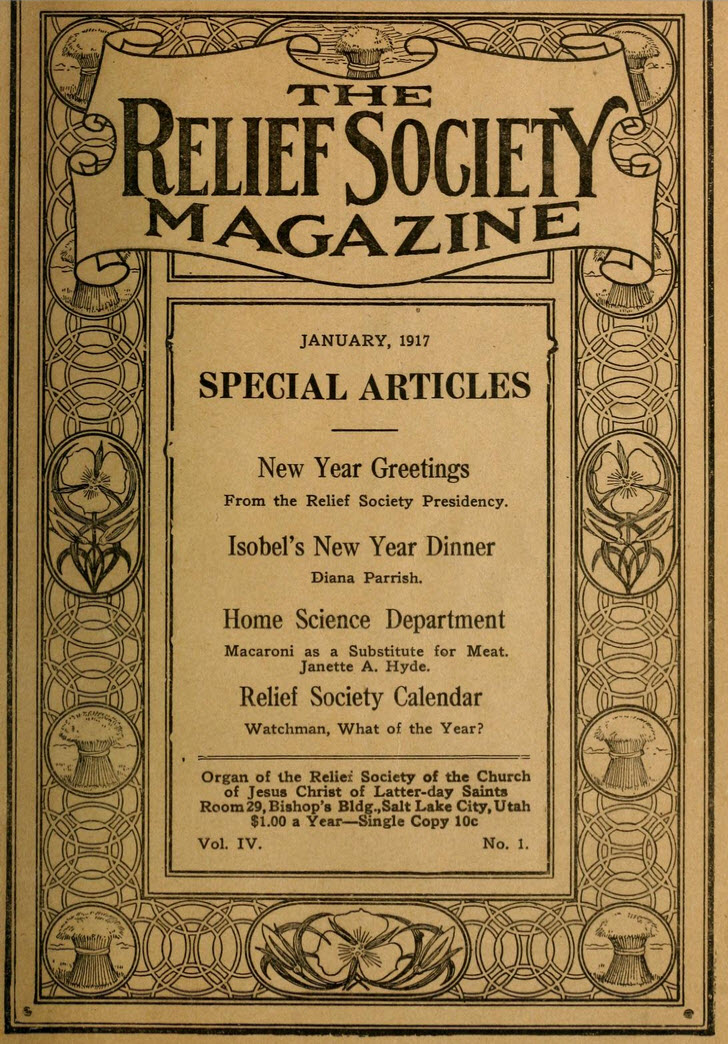

The Relief Society was organized in Utah in 1867. Its purpose was to provide relief and created a unifying society for LDS women to carry out service projects and church services. It became a space for women to act politically, both liberally and conservatively. The main topics of conversation in this period were Women's Suffrage in Utah and gender equality in politics and within the church. They also provided magazines for women such as The Relief Society Magazine that was run by female editors, and discussed Women's suffrage as well as relief projects and spiritual subjects.

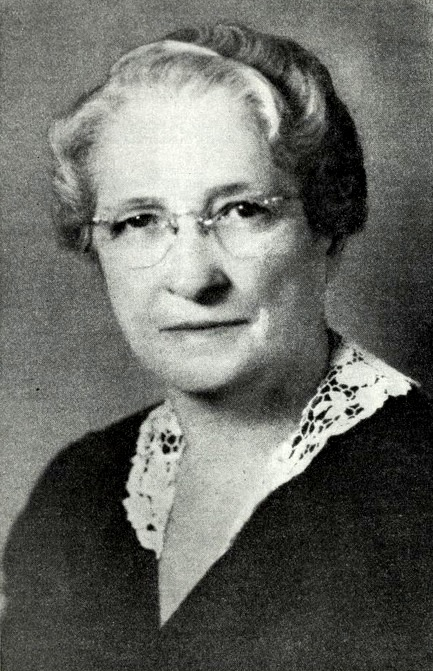
Amy Brown Lyman

==== Amy Brown Lyman ====
Amy Brown Lyman was born in Pleasant Grove, Utah into a polygamist Latter Day Saint Family in February 1872. She was the twenty-third out of twenty-five children to her father with three wives. They lived on a small farm and she grew up doing chores and learning maternal skills. Her parents were involved in community affairs, which allowed Lyman to observe and learn how to solve issues within the church and in the community. She was in church leadership positions since she was eleven years old and acted as the secretary of the Primary Association in her area, giving speeches for the group. She always hoped to grow up to become a teacher. She studied to become a teacher at the formerly known Brigham Young Academy with her older sister. Lyman taught at Brigham Young Academy as well as the University of Utah.

At that same time, she served as the first director of the LDS Social Services Department and was a part of the LDS Relief Society presidency for thirty-five years, serving as the president for five years in the early 1940s. She was given assignments from Joseph F. Smith, the President of the Church of Jesus Christ of Latter Day Saints, to transition the Relief Society into the new century. She took part in created the first teaching manuals and church magazines. Her most notable achievement was creating the LDS Social Services Department. Lyman extended service to those of other faiths and communities, working with government relief systems. She was passionate about the government's responsibility to aid the people. She petitioned the Salt Lake County Government to recognize its role in providing relief to its citizens, which led to more money spent on welfare, as well as a drop in infant and mother mortality rates in the 1920s. These actions led the Relief Society to become a national and eventually world-wide source of aid.

Amy B. Lyman received the Brigham Young University Distinguished Alumnus Award in 1937. She died on December 4, 1959.
