= Little Cottonwood Creek Valley, Utah =

- CDP
- Little Cottonwood Creek Valley in 2026
- Interactive map of Little Cottonwood Creek Valley, Utah
- Coordinates: 40°36′5″N 111°49′30″W
- Country: United States
- State: Utah
- County: Salt Lake

Area
  - Total: 2.6 sq mi (6.7 km^{2})
  - Land: 2.6 sq mi (6.7 km^{2})
  - Water: 0 sq mi (0.0 km^{2})
- Elevation: 4,623 ft (1,409 m)

Population (2000)
  - Total: 7,221
  - Density: 2,780/sq mi (1,072/km^{2})
- Time zone: UTC-7 (Mountain (MST))
  - Summer (DST): UTC-6 (MDT)
- FIPS code: 49-45275
- GNIS feature ID: 1867578

Little Cottonwood Creek Valley was a census-designated place (CDP) in Salt Lake County, Utah. The 2000 Census population was 7,221, an increase over the 1990 figure of 5,042. In 2005, the CDP became part of the newly incorporated city of Cottonwood Heights.

== Geography ==
Little Cottonwood Creek Valley is located at 40°36′5″N 111°49′30″W (40.601321, -111.825107).

According to the United States Census Bureau, the CDP had a total area of 6.7 km^{2} (2.6 sq mi), all land.

== Demographics ==
Historical population
Census	Pop.	Note	%±
1990	5,042		—
2000	7,221		43.2%

As of the census of 2000, there were 7,221 people, 2,223 households, and 1,833 families residing in the CDP. The population density was 1,072.3 people /km^{2} (2,777 people/mi^{2}). There were 2,305 housing units at an average density of 342.3 units /km^{2} (887 units/mi^{2}). The racial makeup of the CDP was 95.89% White, 0.51% African American, 0.17% Native American, 1.27% Asian, 0.15% Pacific Islander, 0.36% from other races, and 1.65% from two or more races. Hispanic or Latino of any race were 2.24% of the population.

There were 2,223 households, out of which 42.7% had children under the age of 18 living with them, 73.7% were married couples living together, 6.5% had a female householder with no husband present, and 17.5% were non-families. 13.9% of all households were made up of individuals, and 3.8% had someone living alone who was 65 years of age or older. The average household size was 3.25 and the average family size was 3.60.

In the CDP, the population was spread out, with 29.5% under the age of 18, 12.1% from 18 to 24, 22.0% from 25 to 44, 28.3% from 45 to 64, and 8.0% who were 65 years of age or older. The median age was 35 years. For every 100 females, there were 103.3 males. For every 100 females age 18 and over, there were 98.4 males.

The median income for a household in the CDP was $77,652, and the median income for a family was $95,150. Males had a median income of $60,521 versus $29,594 for females. The per capita income for the CDP was $37,669. About 1.3% of families and 2.0% of the population were below the poverty line, including 1.9% of those under age 18 and 3.5% of those age 65 or over.

== See also ==
- Little Cottonwood Creek
