= Sarah Granger Kimball =

American suffragist (1818–1898)

Sarah Melissa Granger Kimball
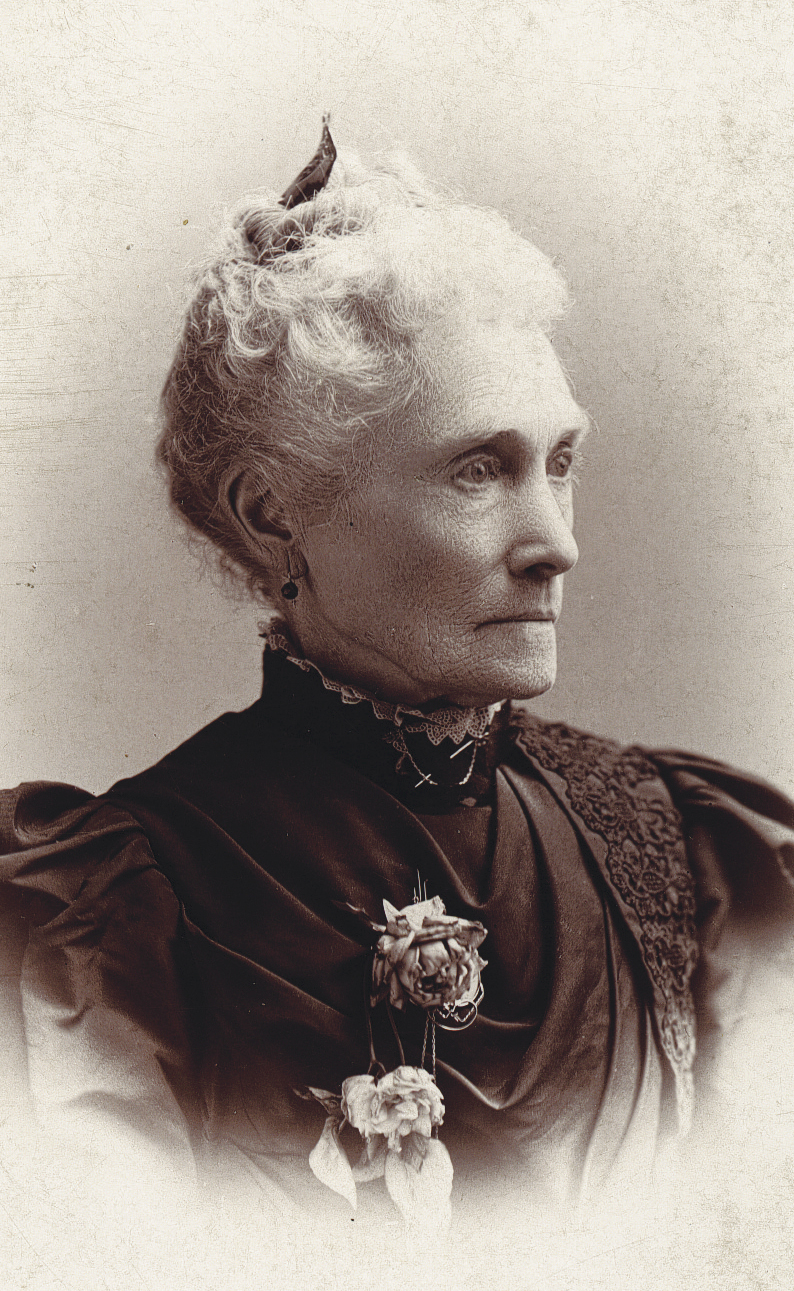
- Born: December 29, 1818; Phelps, New York.
- Died: December 1, 1898 (aged 79); Salt Lake City, Utah, U.S.
- Resting place: Salt Lake City Cemetery
- Known for: Women's Rights Advocate; Relief Society Leader
- Spouse: Hiram Kimball (1806–1863)
- Children: 6
- Parent(s): Oliver Granger and Lydia Dibble

Sarah Melissa Granger Kimball (December 29, 1818 – December 1, 1898) was a 19th-century Latter-day Saint advocate for women's rights and early leader in the Relief Society of the Church of Jesus Christ of Latter-day Saints. Sarah's involvement in the church led to the establishment of the women's Relief Society, as well as participation in the national suffrage movement.

== Conversion and church involvement ==
Sarah Granger was a daughter of Oliver Granger and his wife, Lydia Dibble. She was born in Phelps, New York to a prominent Puritan family. In 1830, Sarah's father acquired a copy of the Book of Mormon, and stated he had a vision of the ancient prophet, Moroni, testifying of the book's truth. Her family soon joined the Church of Christ, which was founded by Joseph Smith. Three years after their conversion, the family moved to Kirtland, Ohio with other church members. There, a teenage Sarah attended Smith's School of the Prophets, which focused on religious and secular education. Sarah and her family then moved to Commerce, Illinois, which soon became Nauvoo.

In Nauvoo, Sarah met Hiram S. Kimball, a non-Latter Day Saint merchant. The couple married in 1840 and welcomed their first child in 1841. Together, they had six children, including three who were adopted. At the time of their first son's birth, church members were working on construction of the Nauvoo Temple. Sarah desired to contribute to the construction efforts, but felt uncomfortable donating since Hiram was not a member of the church. After discussing a contribution, Hiram donated a plot of land north of the temple property. Hiram was later baptized in 1843.

The initial meeting in preparation to organize the Relief Society was held in the Kimball home. A dozen Latter Day Saint sisters gathered in hopes of "forming a 'Ladies Society' for future service projects". Eliza R. Snow assisted in creating formal guidelines for the organizations and preparing them for Smith's approval. On March 17, 1842, the Female Relief Society of Nauvoo was organized under the direction of Smith and the priesthood. By 1844, the Nauvoo Relief Society had 1,341 members.

The Kimball family moved west with the Mormon pioneers, settling in Salt Lake City in 1851. However, Sarah made the initial journey alone with the children, as Hiram's business required him to stay in New York for some time. When Hiram did join the family out west, he had very little money and was in poor health. To support her family, Sarah taught schoolchildren.

In her early forties, Sarah began to worry about having rejected Joseph Smith in Nauvoo over the teaching of plural marriage, telling him to "teach it to someone else." In 1858 Brigham Young offered a solution that her husband Hiram should stand as proxy during her sealing to Joseph Smith.

== Relief Society leadership ==
In 1857, Sarah was called to be Relief Society president of Salt Lake City's 15th Ward. However, certain events, including the Utah War, forced the organization's activities to subside until 1867. During those ten years, both Sarah's mother and Hiram died. He drowned in a steamship accident while traveling to Hawaii to serve a full-time mission. In 1867, the Relief Society was reestablished and Sarah resumed her duties as Relief Society president. She served in that position for 42 years until her death.

On November 13, 1868, Sarah laid the cornerstone of the church's first ever Relief Society building. The sisters used this building as a shop to sell hand-made items. The profits were used to "furnish the hall; purchase shares for the ward organ; build a granary and stock it with grain; contribute to funds for Perpetual Emigration, the Salt Lake and Logan temples, and the Deseret Hospital; provide carpet for the ward meetinghouse; and purchase a knitting machine and set up a tailoring establishment within the ward." The construction of the 15th Ward Relief Society Hall was intended to inspire similar endeavors by sisters throughout the church. By the end of the 1800s, Relief Societies owned property valued at $95,000 and Relief Society halls had been built in other locations including Idaho, Arizona, Canada, and Mexico.

In addition to her ward calling, Sarah served as the general secretary of the Relief Society starting in 1880, after it was reorganized under the leadership of Snow. She served as secretary for 12 years before becoming a counselor in the Relief Society General Presidency. Until her death, Sarah served concurrently in her ward and general Relief Society callings.

== Women's suffrage ==
=== In Utah ===
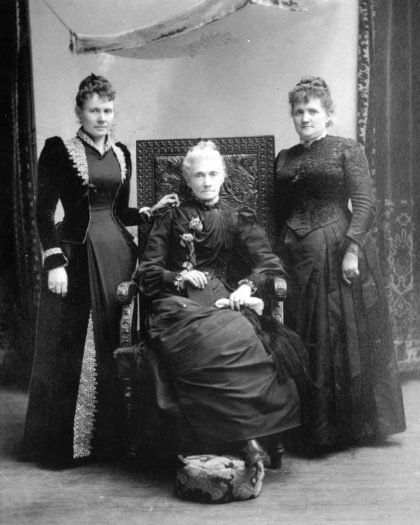
Emily S. Richards (co-founder of Utah Woman Suffrage Association), Phebe Y. Beattie (executive committee chair of UWSA), and Sarah Granger Kimball (second president of UWSA). located at Utah State Historical Society.

Kimball was a member of the 1882 Utah State Constitutional Convention. By 1890, Kimball was the first president of the Utah Women's Suffrage Association and a leader in the national suffrage movement.

=== Nationally ===
She was good friends with women's rights activist, Susan B. Anthony, and worked closely with her.

== Death ==
Kimball died in Salt Lake City on December 1, 1898. The inscription on her headstone reads, "Strong-Minded and Warm-Hearted."

== See also ==
- Phrenology and the Latter Day Saint Movement
- Women's suffrage in Utah

== Sources ==
- W. Jeffrey Marsh. "Kimball, Sarah Granger" in Arnold K. Garr, Donald Q. Cannon and Richard O. Cowan, ed., Encyclopedia of Latter-day Saint History, p. 608-609.
