= Seraph Young Ford =

First American woman to vote

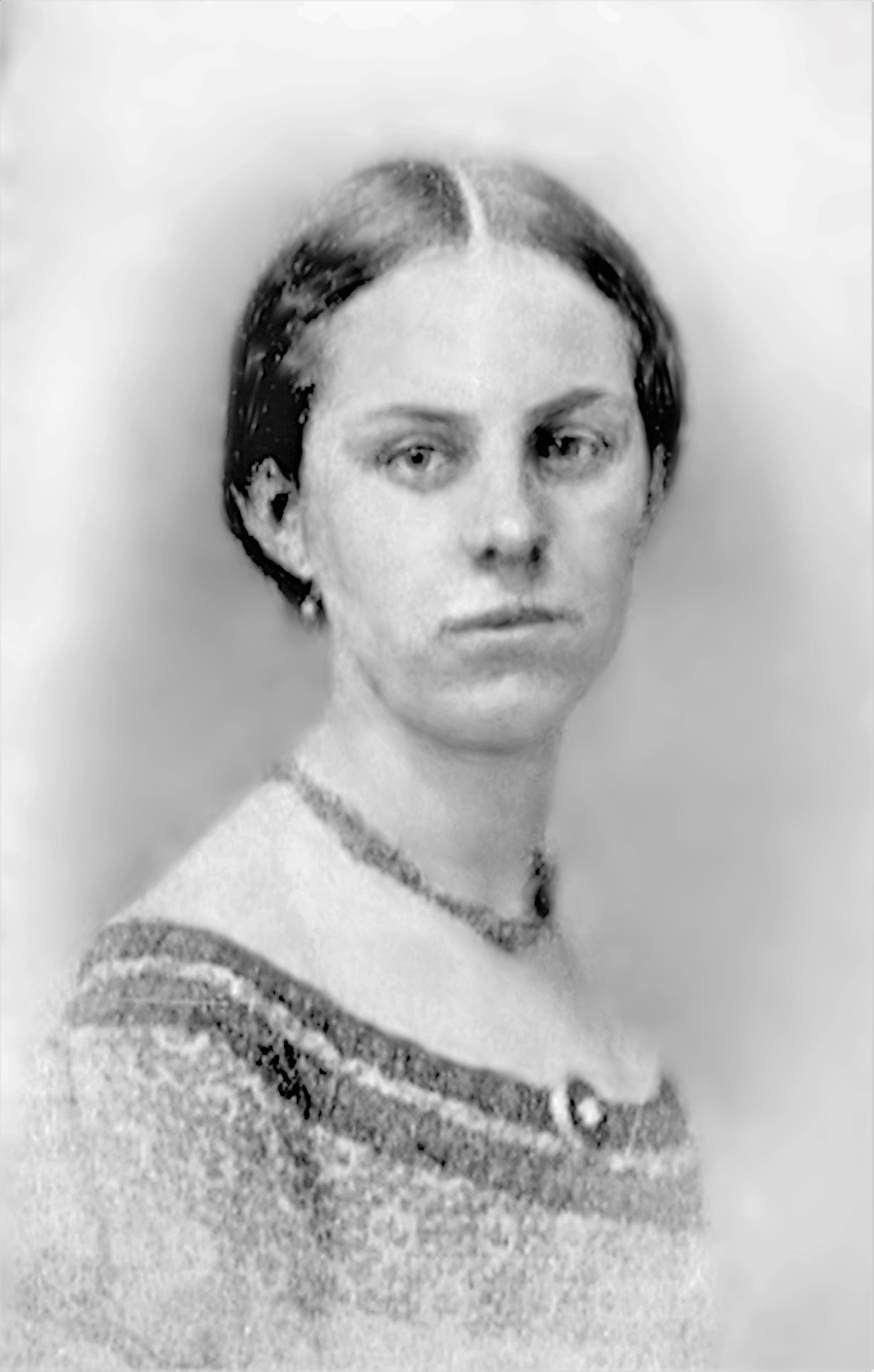
Seraph Young, photo published in the Deseret Evening News March 1902

Seraph Young Ford (November 6, 1846 – June 22, 1938) was the first woman to cast a ballot under a law that made women citizens' voting rights equal to men's in the United States. She voted in Salt Lake City's municipal election on February 14, 1870, becoming the first woman to vote after the Utah Territory passed a women's equal suffrage law, just two days prior.

== Biography ==
Seraph Cedenia Young was born on November 6, 1846, to Cedenia Clark and Brigham Hamilton Young in Winter Quarters, Nebraska. The Young family migrated to the Great Basin the next year along with other Mormon refugees, arriving in October 1847 and settling in Salt Lake City. Young, grandniece of Brigham Young, was the oldest of nine children and eventually became a teacher at the model school at the University of Deseret. She was twenty-three years old and teaching at the university at the time of her historic vote.

Utah's territorial legislature unanimously passed a law extending voting rights to women citizens in February 1870. Acting territorial governor Stephen A. Mann signed the bill into law on February 12, 1870, and Salt Lake City's municipal election was held just two days later. Although Wyoming Territory had extended voting rights to women citizens before Utah Territory did, Utah held two elections – the municipal election on February 14 and a territory-wide election on August 1 – before Wyoming women first cast ballots on September 6. Seraph Young's historic vote was cast at Council Hall, which in 1870 served as the city hall for Salt Lake City and housed the territory's Legislative Assembly. The building was moved in 1961 to the grounds of the Utah State Capitol.

No historical records survive that record Young's feelings about the issue of woman suffrage, but newspapers reported that she was the first woman to cast her vote on February 14, 1870, which made her the first American woman to vote under a law that gave women the same voting rights as men. Young's simple action made history. Young did not go on to become a leader in the women's rights movement, but Utah women remembered her even decades later as the first to vote.

In 1872, Young married Seth L. Ford in Salt Lake City. He was a printer from Buffalo, New York and a Union Army veteran during the American Civil War. The couple had three children, two of whom survived to adulthood. She moved farther east as her husband's health deteriorated from wounds sustained during the war. They lived most of their married life in New York and Maryland. She struggled to support the family after he became blind and paralyzed, for a time the family raised money by singing and playing the harmonica on street corners. Young cared for Ford until his death in 1910, and was buried next to him in Arlington National Cemetery after her death in 1938. Her headstone read “Serath” instead of the correct spelling of her first name until it was fixed in 2020. Young is now listed among the notable burials at the Cemetery.

== Commemoration ==
A mural depicting Seraph Young's vote, created by artist David Koch, is in the House of Representatives chamber of the Utah State Capitol. In 2019, the Utah Capitol Preservation Board approved a women's history sculpture for the lawn in front of Council Hall to honor Seraph Young's historic first vote and commemorate Utah's role in the struggle for women's suffrage. The sculpture, designed by Utah artists Kelsey Harrison and Jason Manning, was installed in the summer of 2020. In 2019, the state legislature recognized Seraph Young's vote and passed a bill designating February 14 as Women's Voter Registration Day. On February 14, 2020, the 150th anniversary of Seraph Young's vote, public history non-profit Better Days 2020 led a remembrance walk to Council Hall, where Salt Lake City mayor Erin Mendenhall spoke about the importance of Utah women's leadership in the suffrage movement and encouraged Utah citizens to register and vote.
