= Emily Sophia Tanner Richards =

Suffragette from Utah

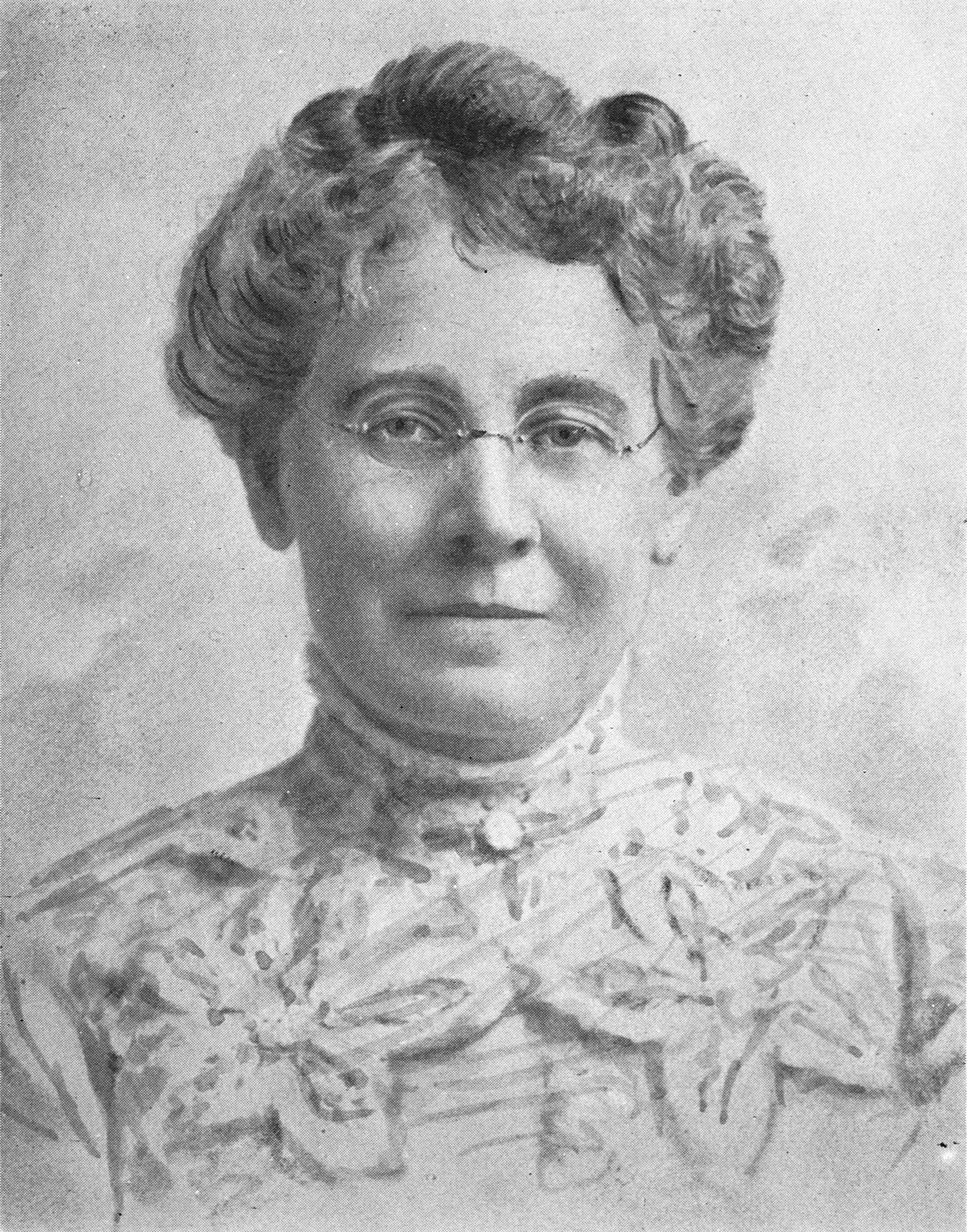

Personal details
- Born: Emily Sophia Tanner; May 13, 1850; Little Cottonwood, Provisional State of Deseret, United States
- Died: August 19, 1929 (aged 79); Salt Lake City, Utah, United States
- Known For: Founding the Utah Women's Suffrage Association

Emily Sophia Tanner Richards (May 13, 1850 – August 19, 1929) was a key figure in the founding of the Utah Woman's Suffrage Association.

== Early life and marriage ==
Emily Sophia Tanner was born in the Salt Lake City Cottonwood settlement to Rachel and Nathan Tanner and was the granddaughter of John Tanner (Mormon). At age six, She moved to Salt Lake Valley to attend school. At age eighteen, Emily Tanner married an old schoolmate, Franklin S. Richards, who later became the leading attorney for the Church of Jesus Christ of Latter-day Saints (LDS Church). The next year the young couple moved to Ogden to stay with the Richards family. Emily Richards raised five children.

In 1882, Emily and Franklin Richards along with their children moved to Washington, D.C. so that Franklin Richards could lobby the U.S. Congress for Utah statehood.

== Women's suffrage work ==
While in D.C. Richards met many national suffrage leaders. In 1886, Richards along with Josephine R. West, Emmeline B. Wells, and Ellen B. Ferguson presented a memorial of the women of Utah to president Grover Cleveland to reduce anti-Mormon sentiment. The Edmunds–Tucker Act disenfranchised Utah women the following year.

In 1888, Emily Richards asked permission from the Church of Jesus Christ of Latter-day Saints leadership to form a Utah chapter of the National Women's Suffrage Association. The Church of Jesus Christ endorsed her proposition and the association was officially organized on January 10, 1889. Richards became a state organizer serving under Margaret N. Caine who was the president of the Utah association. Richards continued to establish many local suffragette associations across Utah and these local associations played a major role in granting voting rights to women in the 1895 Utah Constitution.

As a leading suffragist in Utah, Richards was invited to the Chicago World's Columbian Exposition of 1893. She spoke at the World's Congress of Representative Women on May 19, 1893 with a speech entitled The Legal and Political Status of Woman in Utah. Her speech was so well received that it was included in the official publication of the World's Congress of Representative Women. At the World's Columbian Exposition Richards also spoke at the Women's Branch of the World's Parliament of Religions. No male representatives of the LDS church were allowed admission yet Richards was invited to speak. Her success at the World's Columbian Exposition led her to represent Utah women in others fairs: San Francisco (1894), Atlanta (1895), and Omaha (1898).

In 1896, she was an alternate delegate to the Democratic National Convention for Utah. In 1920, Richards was also involved in the organization of the Utah chapter of the League of Women Voters.

== Involvement with the LDS church ==
At the time many members of The Church of Jesus Christ of Latter-day Saints practiced polygamy, but the Richards stayed monogamous. Richards became a spokesperson representing Utah and its women by speaking on behalf of The Church of Jesus Christ of Latter-day Saints. She was the public face of the LDS church while the religious organization transitioned "from plural marriage toward monogamy and assimilation."

In The Church of Jesus Christ of Latter-day Saints, Richards served as a member of the Relief Society General Board.

== Publications ==
- The legal and political status of Woman in Utah, 1894.
- The Republican catechism, criticised and amended for the benefit of the women of Utah to whom it is respectfully presented, 1896.

== Bibliography ==
- "Emily Sophia Tanner Richards". The Church Historian's Press. 2018. Archived from the original on 13 July 2018.
- Quinn, D. Michael (1980). "They Served". The Church of Jesus Christ of Latter-Day Saints.
- Radke-Moss, Andrea G. (2014). Women of Faith in the Latter Days, Vol. 3. Deseret Book Company.
- Toone, Trent (2014). Politicians, missionaries and mothers: 11 remarkable women in LDS Church history. Deseret News. Archived from the original on 2018-07-13.
- White, Jean Bickmore (1994). "Women's Suffrage in Utah". Utah History Encyclopedia. Archived from the original on 2018-07-14.
